= The King's Awards for Enterprise =

Awards programme for British organizations

- Award logo
- Awarded for: Business innovation and performance.
- Country: United Kingdom
- Presented by: The King, on the advice of the Prime Minister
- First award: 1966
- Website: www.gov.uk/kings-awards-for-enterprise

The King's Awards for Enterprise, previously known as The Queen's Award for Enterprise, is an awards programme for British businesses and other organizations who excel at international trade, innovation, sustainable development or promoting opportunity (through social mobility). They are the highest official UK awards for British businesses. The scheme was established as The Queen's Award to Industry by a royal warrant of 30 November 1965, and awards are given for outstanding achievement by UK businesses in the categories of innovation, international trade, sustainable development and promoting opportunity through social mobility.

Each award is valid for five years: recipients are invited to a royal reception and are presented with the award at their company premises by one of the King's representatives, a Lord-lieutenant. Recipients are also able to fly the King's Awards flag at their main office, and use the emblem on marketing materials such as packaging and adverts.

== History ==
Every May 6, the Anniversary of the Coronation of King Charles III, winners of the King's Awards for Enterprise are officially announced in a special Gazette supplement. The Queen's Award to Industry, the scheme's original title, was instituted by Royal Warrant in 1965. It became the Queen's Awards for Export and Technology in 1975, with Environmental Achievement added in 1992. In 1999, the scheme became the Queen's Awards for Enterprise, with International Trade, Innovation and Sustainable Development as the categories. In 2017, a fourth category was introduced, Promoting Opportunity (through social mobility). From 2005 individuals were also recognised with the Queen's Award for Enterprise Promotion; that Awards was rested in 2017. In February 2023 the Awards were renamed to The King’s Award for Enterprise.

=== Organisations – totals ===
The total numbers of winners in each class each year are shown below.

Year	International Trade (Export)	Innovation (Technology)	Export and Technology (Combined)	Sustainable Development (Environmental Achievement)	Promoting Opportunity (Through Social Mobility)	Total awards
2026	75	52		36	22	185
2025	116	46		27	10	199
2024	161	59		29	8	252
2023	78	47		15	9	148
2022	141	51		31	9	232
2021	122	48		17	18	205
2020	128	66		19	7	220
2019	129	61		6	5	201
2018	152	72		8	6	230
2017	102	57		11		170
2016	150	92		7		243
2015	105	24		12		141
2014	110	39		13		162
2013	116	27		9		152
2012	151	50		8		209
2011	103	44		10		157
2010	95	38		10		143
2009	135	49		10		194
2008	85	42		12		139
2007	71	40		8		119
2006	90	48		7		145
2005	88	41		8		137
2004	66	39		7		112
2003	62	51		10		123
2002	85	37		9		131
2001	76	42		15		133
2000	77	32		7		116
1999	82	14		5		101
1998	115	14		4		133
1997	110	16		8		134
1996	107	16		6		129
1995	140	17		6		163
1994	139	18		8		165
1993	118	25		12		155
1992	127	38				165
1991	118	40				158
1990	126	49				175
1989	116	40				156
1988	102	43				145
1987	120	34				154
1986	114	27				141
1985	90	29				119
1984	88	23				111
1983	90	20				110
1982	91	19				110
1981	92	17				109
1980	87	17				104
1979	102	19				121
1978	107	17				124
1977	106	19				125
1976	95	20				115
1975	76	17	2			95
1974	59	19	-			78
1973	66	15	2			83
1972	72	17	1			90
1971	93	13	4			110
1970	74	25	5			104
1969	69	24	6			99
1968	60	17	8			85
1967	48	28	9			85
1966	86	11	18			115
TOTAL	4,585	1,357	55	179		6,176

=== Recipients – individuals ===
The Queen's Award for Enterprise Promotion was awarded to individuals. Unlike the Queen's Award for Enterprise, nomination must be by a third party. As of 2017, this individual award had been rested.

== 2026 recipients ==
In 2026, 185 King's Awards for Enterprise were granted across four categories: 75 for International Trade, 52 for Innovation, 36 for Sustainable Development and 22 for Promoting Opportunity through Social Mobility.

=== International Trade ===
Recipient
Activinsights Ltd
Air Covers Ltd
Alchemy Ingredients Ltd
Altus Science Ltd
Antibodies.com Ltd
Ardent Ltd
Ayata Group Ltd
Beldam Crossley Ltd
Butterfly Poultry Ltd
Cares Laboratory Ltd
Chorus Intelligence Ltd
Clarus Networks Ltd
CTE Advanced Technologies Ltd
CTS Europe Ltd
Devoncraft UK Ltd
DIG International Group Ltd
EarthSense Systems Ltd
Enterprise, Trade & Knowledge Group Ltd
ERG (Air Pollution Control) Ltd
Exceed (XCD) Holdings Ltd
Express Engineering (Group) Ltd
Fleet Finco Ltd trading as Argus Media Ltd
Focal Point Fires Ltd
Hatch Associates Ltd
Independent Forgings and Alloys Ltd
Inflo Group Ltd
Invogue Ltd
Irwin Mitchell LLP
Kentec Electronics Ltd.
Kranlee Logistics Ltd
Laser Wire Solutions Ltd
Learning Resource Network
Linnk Group
London Marine Insurance Services Ltd
Luminance Technologies Ltd
Lumsden Design Ltd
Lyngard Ltd
Mace Consult Ltd
Metal Events Ltd
Microlise Group Plc
Nexus BioQuest
Northern Consortium UK Ltd
OpenWorks Engineering Ltd
PSW Integrity
QBS Technology Group
Redmayne 1860 Ltd
Redtail Telematics Ltd
Reincubate Ltd
RJM Corporation (EC) Ltd
Royal Oak Health Ltd
Ryse 3D Ltd
S.J.M. Alloys & Metals Ltd
Sandea Wholesale
Sharland England Ltd
Sicut Enterprises Ltd
Spectra Group (UK) Ltd
Spencer Feeds (Asia) Ltd
Sport:80
Sterling Quality Services Ltd
Sygna (EMEA) Ltd
Systems Engineering & Assessment Ltd
Tailfin Ltd
TechPlant Ltd
Terra Global Solutions Ltd.
The Caledonian Tree Company Ltd
The Profs Tuition Ltd
The Wool Packaging Company Ltd T/A Woolcool
Thermserve Ltd
Trivandi Ltd
Valour Consultancy Ltd
Vuba Chemical Innovations Ltd
Walker's Shortbread Ltd
Wool Room Ltd
World Products Ltd
Z100 Community Ltd

=== Innovation ===
Recipient
3Keel Group Ltd
3P Innovation Ltd
Active Tunnelling Ltd
Advanced Innergy Ltd
Airdri Ltd
Anchor Systems (International) Ltd
Avantis Education Ltd
AW Hainsworth & Sons Ltd
Chemical Processing Services Ltd
C-Kore Systems Ltd
Ergochair Ltd
Express Merchants Ltd
Fabrx Ltd
Foxway Circular UK Ltd
Icon Solutions (UK) Ltd
Ideal Boilers Ltd trading as Ideal Heating
Idem Safety Switches Ltd
Internet Investigations Solutions
Ionix Advanced Technologies
Luminous Show Technology Ltd
Magic Tech Ltd
Maritime Developments Ltd
Merxin Ltd
Metricell
Monodraught Ltd
Mucky Nutz Ltd
MysteryVibe Ltd
NEWREG Ltd
Novatus Global Ltd
Ocean Signal Ltd
Oliver Valvetek
Oprogroup Ltd
Optical Metrology Services
Palintest Ltd
Pet Remedy Ltd
Phoenix Sealing Ltd
Plextek Services Ltd
Quantum Science Ltd
Reacton Fire Suppression Ltd
Safety Letterbox Company Ltd
Salad Finance Ltd
Sharpak Yate Ltd
Solent Rib Charters Ltd
Supra UK Ltd (T/A The Keysafe Company)
Tailfin Ltd
The Dog-G8 Company Ltd
Travel Counsellors
VAC-EX Ltd
Vascutek Ltd, Trading as Terumo Aortic
Vision RT Ltd
West Special Fasteners Ltd
Zed Pods Ltd

=== Sustainable Development ===
Recipient
Bionema Group Ltd
Blue Skies Holdings Ltd
CAMA AssetStore Ltd
Charity Bank Ltd
Courteenhall Farms Partnership
Crystal Spring Consumer Division Ltd
Dura Composites Ltd
Enovation Consulting Ltd
Environmental Finance Ltd
Ethstat Ethical Stationery CIC
Fashion-Enter Ltd
Hive PR Group Ltd
House of Hackney Ltd
Houston & Hawkes Ltd
Howad Ltd T/A incognito
KOcycle Ltd
Little Soap Company Ltd
McKerr Farming Ltd
Meteor Inkjet Ltd
Nene Park Trust
Nikwax Ltd
Oakland Central Ltd
OLPRO Ltd
Paradigm Norton Financial Planning
Protec International Ltd
Services Design Solution Ltd
Sumillion Ltd
Techbuyer Ltd
The Edinburgh Remakery Ltd
The Natural Mat Co Ltd
Tops Day Nursery Ltd
Topspeed Couriers Ltd
Vaculug Ltd
Wales Millennium Centre
Waste to Wonder Network Operations Ltd
Webmart Ltd

=== Promoting Opportunity ===
Recipient
Acres Engineering Ltd
Aspire Community Works Community Interest Company
Catimor Ltd (T/A Redemption Roasters)
Dragonheart Homes Ltd
Enterprise East Group CIC
Evtec Automotive Ltd
Forfusion Ltd
Fowler & Gilbert Ltd
Hydrapower Dynamics Ltd
John O'Conner (Grounds Maintenance) Ltd
Laltex & Company Ltd
Lee Marley Brickwork Ltd
M.B.Roche & Sons Ltd
Pave-Aways Ltd
Rhotic Media
Sandwell College
Sewell Ventures
Stand Out Enterprises Ltd
The Forshaw Group Ltd
The Midcounties Co-operative Ltd (part of OurCoop)
The Wiggett Group Ltd
The Workplace Depot Ltd

== 2025 recipients ==
In 2025, 197 organisations received 199 King's Awards for Enterprise. The awards comprised 116 for International Trade, 46 for Innovation, 27 for Sustainable Development and 10 for Promoting Opportunity through Social Mobility.

=== International Trade ===
Recipient
Abacus Lighting Limited
Abbey Forged Products Ltd
Adlib Audio Ltd
Aerotron Group (Holdings) Limited
Airpure International Limited
Allaero Limited
Amack Group Ltd
Artemis Aerospace Limited
Aydya Limited
Bamboo Distribution Ltd
Beadlight Limited
Bowers & Jones Ltd.
Brand Hatchers Ltd
Brightsun Travel UK Ltd
CABINZERO LIMITED
Charcoalblue LLP
Cheese Matters Ltd
Clarendon Specialty Fasteners Ltd
Clear Value Trading Ltd
Collaborate & Innovate Ltd
Costello Medical Consulting Ltd
Createc Ltd
Crystal Spring Consumer Division Ltd
Datum Electronics Ltd
DD-Scientific Ltd.
Deluxe Art & Theme Ltd
Dr PawPaw Limited
Elfab Limited
Elgin White Limited
Enovation Consulting Ltd
Exol (Holdings) Limited
FB Chain LTD
FENNEX LTD
Frontier Therapeutics Limited
Gas Strategies Group Limited
Gill Instruments Limited
GT Engine Services
Harod Associates Limited
Hasgrove Limited
Impact Subsea Ltd.
Inside Out Contracts Ltd
InspecVision Ltd
International Energy Products Limited
Intralink Limited
Invertek Drives Ltd
J G GLOVER & CO LTD
Jellycat Limited
John King Chains Limited
John Packer Ltd
JPA Product Design Limited
Kinewell Energy Ltd
Leafield Environmental Limited
Letterfest LTD
Level Peaks Associates Ltd
Londonist DMC Ltd
Lund Halsey Console Systems Ltd
Made Media Ltd
Midland Aerospace Ltd
Mobell Communications Limited
Nafs Health Consultancy & Training Ltd
Navsa International Limited
Neal Jones Furniture Ltd
Occupancy Marketing Limited T/A 80 DAYS
Oliver Valves Ltd
Penta Consulting Limited
Pentland Group Holdings Limited
PHMG Limited
Pimberly Limited
PortSwigger Ltd
PSP Worldwide Logistics
Public Digital Limited
Q5 Ltd
Rabbie's Trail Burners Ltd
Rainbow Cosmetics (Manchester) Limited – Own Brands Division
Rainbow Productions Ltd
Reagent Chemical Services Ltd
Red Savannah Ltd
Roberts Recycling Ltd
Rowing Solutions Ltd
Rubberatkins Ltd
RunFlat International Limited
Saracen Horse Feeds Ltd
Scitegrity Limited
SEADA Technology Ltd
Shearwell Data Limited
Sibylline Limited
Signum Aviation Ltd
Solderking Assembly Materials Limited
Sole Bliss Ltd
Sonardyne International Limited
Specialist Aviation Ltd
Spectrum Technologies Ltd
Sprint Logistics Holdings Limited
Stanhope-Seta Limited
Star Pacific UK Limited
Stephensons Online LTD
Symbiosis Pharmaceutical Services Limited
Technical Services (UK) Ltd
The Cognition Company Group Ltd
The Config Team Ltd
The Group Company (UK) Ltd
The Silver Crane Company Limited
The Sports Consultancy
The Tracklement Company Limited
The Village Bakery Wrexham
Think So Ltd
Tomcat Special Needs Innovation Ltd
Turner & Townsend (Holdings) Limited
UTM Limited
Viper Innovations Ltd
Virtual Human Resources Holdings Limited
We Get Any Stock Ltd
White Rose Education Limited
WITTENSTEIN high integrity systems Ltd
Yordas Group Ltd
Ziggurat XYZ Ltd

=== Innovation ===
Recipient
Abacus Flooring Solutions Limited
ApconiX Ltd
Berrington Pure Spring Water LTD
Brompton Technology Limited
Capture Green Limited
Chorus Intelligence Ltd
Covec Limited
Data Conversion Systems Ltd
Delta Fire Ltd
Detectronic Limited
Digital Control Room Limited
Dunphy Combustion Ltd
Eskan Electronics Ltd
Flare Audio Ltd
Garner Aluminium Extrusions Limited
GeoPura LTD
Geoptic Infrastructure Investigations Limited
Glencairn Crystal Studio Ltd
Global Graphics Software Ltd
Gordon Murray Group
Grainger and Worrall Ltd
Gray & Adams Limited
Heraeus Electro-Nite (UK) Ltd
Hurst Green Plastics Ltd
Inductosense Limited
KPM Marine LTD
Mixergy Limited
My Happy Mind Ltd
QUALIS FLOW LIMITED
Rayner Intraocular Lenses Ltd
RENOURISH Limited
Ripple Suicide Prevention
Ross-shire Engineering Limited
Silverstream Technologies
Sirius Constellation Limited
Sky Medical Technology Limited
STASHED PRODUCTS LIMITED
Structural Adhesives Ltd
TLC Design Ltd t/a eto
TMT First Limited
Tracked Carriers Limited t/a ACONDA Industrial Carriers
Transmission Dynamics
Transreport Ltd
Vuba Chemical Innovations Limited
Wonde Limited
Yoto Limited

=== Sustainable Development ===
Recipient
AES Engineering Ltd
Bluestone Resorts Limited
BOF Group Limited
Brompton Bicycle Limited
Camp de Rêves Glamping Ltd
Community Energy South Ltd
Community Products (UK) Limited
David Nieper Ltd
Delta Fire Ltd
Denbies Wine Estate Ltd
English Tea Shop (UK) Ltd.
Fabweld Steel Products Ltd
Gibsons Games Ltd
Green Doors and Window Ltd
Heligan Gardens Ltd
Hobbs House Bakery Ltd
Integra Buildings Limited
Michael Smith Switchgear Ltd
Naked Sprout
Shared Interest Society
Sonardyne International Limited
Sudbury Silk Mills
The Garlic Farm (IOW) Ltd
The Lakes Free Range Egg Company Limited
The London Early Years Foundation (LEYF)
Triodos Bank UK Limited
Vertas Group

=== Promoting Opportunity ===
Recipient
ACS Clothing Limited
Bridgeway Consulting Limited
HTP Apprenticeship College LTD
Netmatters Ltd
Parson & Colson Consultants Ltd t/a PC Consultants
Social Pantry Ltd
Southern Health NHS Foundation Trust
TDK Dalston Wholesale Limited
Upbeat Enterprise Limited
ZIGUP plc

== See also ==
- The Queen's Award for Enterprise: International Trade (Export) (1980)
- The Queen's Award for Enterprise: International Trade (Export) (2006)
- The Queen's Award for Enterprise: International Trade (Export) (2007)
- The Queen's Award for Enterprise: International Trade (Export) (2008)
- The Queen's Award for Enterprise: International Trade (Export) (2009)
- The Queen's Award for Enterprise: International Trade (Export) (2010)
- The Queen's Award for Enterprise: International Trade (Export) (2011)
- Royal warrant of appointment (United Kingdom)
