= International Labmate Ltd =

- Company type: Private
- Industry: Multi Media Publisher and Event Organiser
- Founded: (1974)
- Founder: Michael Pattison
- Headquarters: St Albans, England
- Area served: Worldwide
- Key people: Michael Pattison (Chairman); Marcus Pattison (Managing Director)
- Products: Petro Industry News Journal; International Environmental Technology Journal; Asian Environmental Technology Journal; International Labmate Journal; Labmate UK & Ireland Journal; Lab Asia Journal; Chromatography Today Journal; WWEM Conference & Exhibition; PEFTEC Conference and Exhibition; CEM Conference and Exhibition; AQE Conference and Exhibition; CEM India Conference and Exhibition; Industrial Methane Measurement Conference
- Number of employees: 30
- Website: www.labmate-online.com

International Labmate is a British multi-media publisher and events organiser, founded in 1974 by the chemist Michael Pattison. It publishes business-to-business trade journals in print and online, focusing on the laboratory, life science, environmental and petrochemical industries. It is based in St Albans. Marcus Pattison has been Managing Director since 2023.

In 1996, the company won a Queen's Award for Exports for its publishing activities.

== History ==
The company's first publication was Labmate UK & Ireland, a product card booklet for scientists and laboratory managers. It is still being read by laboratory scientists today and has evolved from its original format into a scientific journal containing product announcements, research and application articles, industry news stories and conference and exhibition reports. In 1996 it opened its first international office in Sydney, Australia. In 2002 the company expanded into conference and exhibition organisation with the launch of the MCERTS series of exhibitions with the Source Testing Association. In 2020 the company also moved into virtual and e-learning events.

== List of publications ==
- International Labmate (1976) aimed at scientists in Europe, the Middle East and Africa. It highlights the latest research and application reports in chromatography, spectroscopy, microscopy and new product releases.
- International Environmental Technology (1990) for readers in Europe, the Middle East and Africa. It focuses on products and services for monitoring, testing and analysis of water, air and soil, and remains the only trade magazine focusing on this subject and target market. International Environmental Technology Digital Issues The magazine features independent application articles, new product announcements, exhibition previews and reviews and technology developments.
- LabAsia (1994) aimed at Asia and Australasia. Lab Asia Magazine Digital editions
- Asian Environmental Technology (1996), a journal for environmental monitoring and analysis in Asia.
- Petro Industry News (1999), a magazine has a worldwide readership among scientists, process operators, instrument managers and analytical chemists. It highlights new applications, new product releases, case studies on measurement and analysis of petroleum, petrochemical, chemical and oil products. Petro Industry News Digital Magazine Issues
- Measurement Analysis China (2003), a Chinese-language magazine is aimed at scientists, process operators and instrument managers.
- Chromatography Today (2008) for analytical scientists who are involved in separation sciences in the United Kingdom and Ireland, co-published with the UK Chromatographic Society. Chromatography Today Website and eBulletin
- Pollution Solutions (2008) a magazine, website and e-newsletter which focuses on pollution treatment, control and cleanup. Pollution Solutions Website and eBulletin

== Conferences ==
- MCERTS series of exhibitions (2002). The events are focused on emissions monitoring in air. In 2013 these exhibitions rebranded as the Air Quality and Emissions Show (AQE), expanding the focus to air quality monitoring and air pollution control.
- Water, Wastewater and environmental Monitoring conference and exhibition (WWEM; 2005-2024). WWEM is a specialist event focuses on water monitoring and testing in the laboratory, in the field and in processes.
- CEM international conferences and exhibitions (acquired in 2009), on emissions and Air Quality monitoring. The CEM events are run every two years at different European locations.
- ICMGP International Conference and Exhibition on Mercury as a Global pollutant.
- PEFTEC (2015), a specialist conference and exhibition for the petrochemical, petroleum, and energy industries.
- CEM India conference (2017) and exhibition on Emissions and Air Quality monitoring
- CEM Middle East conference and exhibition on Emissions and Air Quality Monitoring in India
- CEM Asia conference and exhibition on Emissions and Air Quality Monitoring in Asia
- AQUAMATE India conference and exhibition on Wastewater and Water Monitoring
- AQUAMATE Asia conference and exhibition on Wastewater and Water Monitoring in Asia.
- HTC conference (organised from 2017) on hyphenated techniques in chromatography.
