= DuoBoots =

UK women's footwear brand

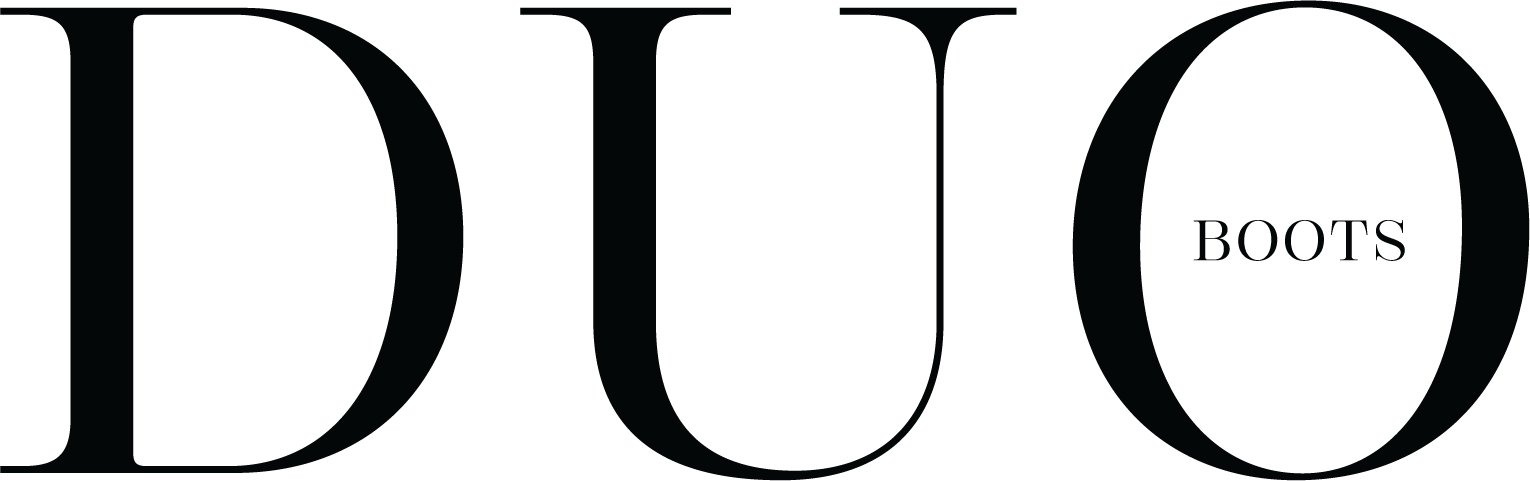
- DuoBoots Logo
- Type: Private
- Industry: Footwear, fashion, design and retail
- Founded: London, UK (1974)
- Headquarters: London, UK
- Website: duoboots.com

DuoBoots is a women's footwear brand that pioneered the concept of boots with multiple calf fittings in the 1970s.

== History ==
In 2012, DuoBoots (then trading under the name Duo) won the Queen's Awards for Enterprise for International Trade 2012

In 2016, the brand briefly became known as Ted&Muffy, named after the brands original founders, Ted and Muffy Maltby, who opened a footwear store in Bath in the early 1970s. In 2017, the brand re-established its original name, DuoBoots.

== Description ==
DuoBoots is based in London and is sold exclusively online. It provides a choice of calf and foot sizes in knee-high and over-the-knee boots. Their boots are handcrafted in Portugal by specialist family-run artisanal factories.
