= Whisky tasting =

Analysis of whisky through visual examination, taste, and aroma

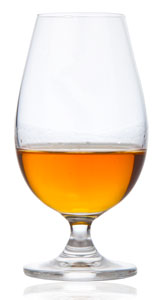
Whisky tasting glass

Whisky tasting is the analysis of whisky through visual examination, taste and aroma. Whisky tastings are often conducted in groups of people, either for reference purposes or as a social activity. More recently, whisky tastings have become a virtual event.

== Tasting glasses ==
Glass selection is important when tasting whisky seriously. The least appropriate is the traditional tumbler due to its large mouth, allowing the dissipation of the fumes and the grip which encourages unwanted warming of the liquid. The generally accepted industry standard for whisky tasting glasses is tulip-shaped with a stem, such as a sherry glass or copita. Another popular glass is the Glencairn whisky glass. Other specifically manufactured tasting glasses include a lid to retain the aromas.

== Tasting methodologies ==
Although there need not be any formal structure to a whisky tasting, more often than not the process will be broken down into the following stages.

== Tasting notes ==
Throughout the tasting process notes may be taken for future reference, or for publication. These will often be separated into notes on the nose, palate and finish. Tasting notes might be literal, such as "a hint of TCP". They may also be more emotive. For example, someone might suggest that the nose of a whisky reminds them of their grandfather's old study, invoking musty books, leather and possibly tobacco aromas. No two persons' noses are the same, however: one may be more sensitive to a particular aroma than another and sometimes a nose might be unable to detect a certain smell at all. This phenomenon, known as nose-blindness, is why tasting notes are best compiled by a panel of three or more.

=== Visual analysis ===
The whisky glass is held at a 45-degree angle, often against a white background, to give a clear view through the spirit. The depth of colour is largely determined by the cask the whisky has been conditioned in: Spanish and European oak tends to impart far more colour than American White oak, for example. A light colour might also indicate a cask which has been re-used several times. A golden colour could be the result of an ex-Bourbon cask whilst a sherry cask will give the whisky a copper colour. But the colour may also give clues as to the age of the whisky, the maturation that the spirit has had and whether or not any artificial colours have been added. In the latter case, however, the aroma of caramel, often used to colour the whisky, is likely to be detectable.

After an initial nosing the whisky is swirled, so that it rises up the edges of the glass, and allowed to settle. The spirit will leave legs on the side of the glass. The thickness of the legs and the length of time they persist will give clues as to the strength of the spirit and the level of cask interaction. Note how cask interaction is of importance as opposed to maturity as the legs will be influenced by how active the cask is. During the repeated process, after water has been added, a hazy appearance will indicate that Chill filtering has not taken place.

=== Nose ===
The spirit is sniffed so that the aroma (nose) can be examined. The nose should be above the rim to start then gradually deeper into the glass to catch the full aroma. Depending on the strength of the spirit being analysed, it is advisable not to put the nose too far into the glass and inhale too deeply at first, in case of burning from the fumes. This is particularly true of cask strength spirits, 60% ABV. Standard strength, 40% ABV, are unlikely to affect the nose in this way. Once comfortable with the strength of the spirit, it's typical to take deep sniffs of the spirit with the mouth open, which has the effect of opening up the palate and making it easier to detect aromas. The glass is then swirled whilst warming the whisky with the hand and the nosing process repeated.

=== Palate ===
The whisky is tasted, often a little at first, and then in larger amounts and with the spirit being moved around the tongue and swallowed slowly. The purpose of the first tasting is to appraise the texture whilst subsequent tastings are to analyse flavours and scents. In the second tasting the primary flavours are determined. There are only five of these, detected by the tongue: salt, sweet, sour, bitter and umami (savoury); the other 'flavours' are aromas and are picked up at the back of the nasal passage.

=== Finish ===
The flavour of the whisky will linger on the palate and will change over time as the flavour decays in the mouth.

=== Water ===
Optionally, the entire process will be repeated with a small amount of water, which changes the flavour profile of the spirit. This is because the water breaks apart the fatty esters in the whisky, releasing the flavour locked within. The water should be at room temperature. The next best thing is a soft spring water. Tap water is adequate but it should be left to stand for several hours to allow the chlorine to disperse. Chilled water or ice is not advisable for whisky tasting as it closes off the flavour. Water should be added a few drops at a time to avoid 'drowning' the whisky. Generally speaking though, whisky imparts most flavour when diluted to 20–30% ABV.

== Publishers ==
There are several publishers of tasting notes, including the following.

- Murray, Jim (2013). Jim Murray's Whisky Bible 2013. Dram Good Books Ltd. ISBN 978-0955472978.
- Jackson, Michael (2010). Malt Whisky Companion 6th Edition. Dorling Kindersley. ISBN 978-1405319669.
- Buxton, Ian (2013). 101 Whiskies to Try Before You Die. Hachette Scotland. ISBN 978-0755360833.
