= Douglas Equipment =

Douglas Equipment Limited
- Company type: Subsidiary
- Industry: Airport and aircraft support vehicles
- Founded: 1947
- Headquarters: Cheltenham, England
- Number of employees: 120
- Parent: Textron Inc.
- Website: http://www.textrongse.com

Douglas Equipment Limited is an English manufacturer of aviation support vehicles such as tugs and tractors. The firm is headquartered in the Arle area of Cheltenham, England with manufacturing operations around the world.

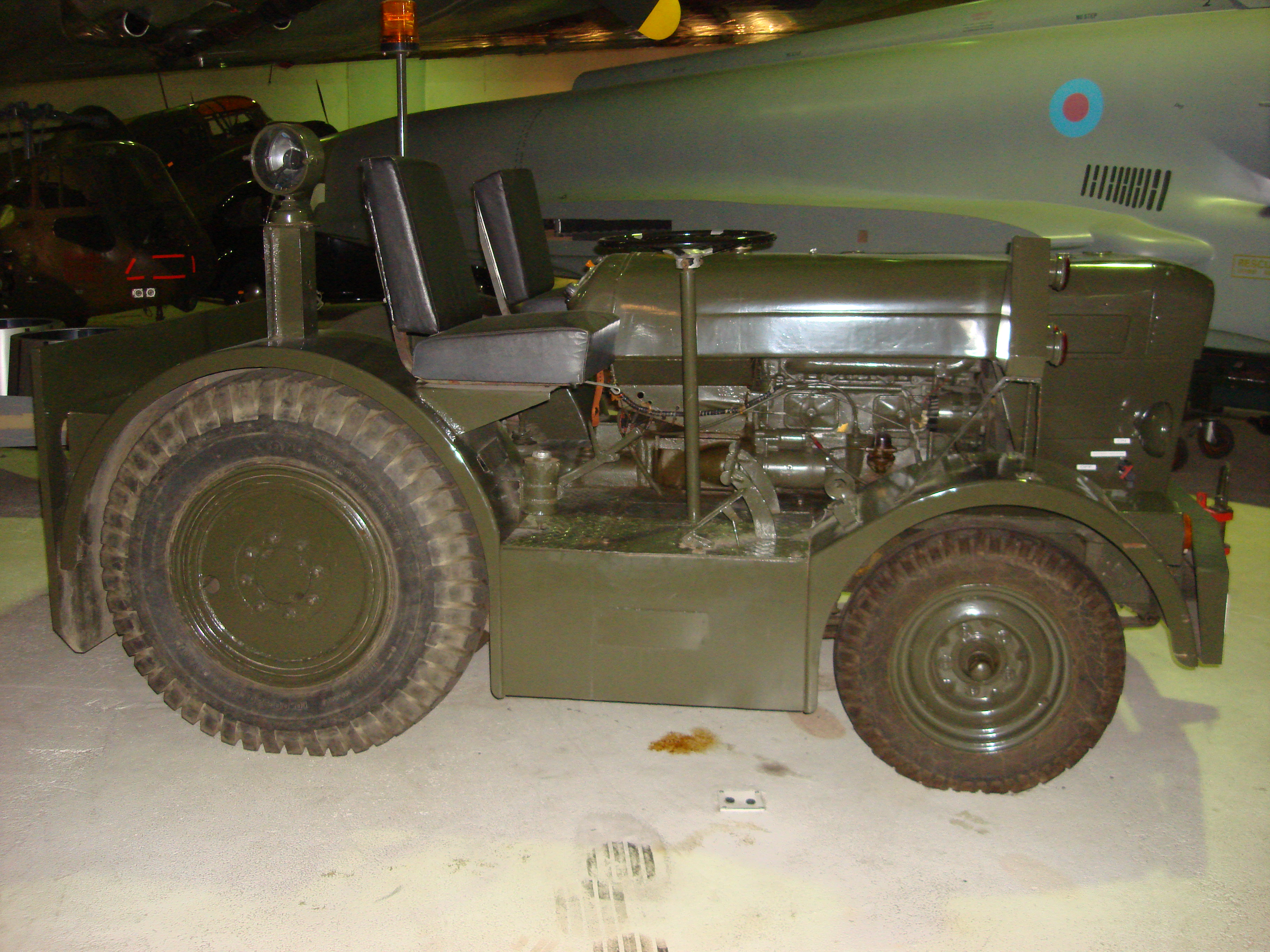
Douglas Taskmaster Aircraft Tractor

Established as FL Douglas (Equipment) Limited in 1947 by Frank Leslie Douglas, it today is a brand of Textron Ground Support Equipment Inc.

Frank Douglas had previously been employed by Universal Power Drives (Unipower), which in 1937 introduced a 4x4 timber tractor, an idea he used when he converted war-surplus 95 bhp AEC Matador 4x4 medium artillery tractors as 4x4 timber tractors.

The firm also built a range of industrial tug trucks for trailer haulage in factories, ports and docks loading ships.

The company is most well known for their line of towbarless aircraft pushback tractors.

In 2010 the company received the Queen's Award for Enterprise in the categories of Innovation and International Trade.

In 2015 Textron acquired Douglas Equipment under their Textron Specialized Vehicles business unit. Then in 2016 Douglas Equipment along with Tug Technologies, Premier Deicers, and Safeaero Deicers re-branded together as Textron Ground Support Equipment.

As of November 2020 the Cheltenham site appears closed, all signage has been removed and the site is locked up. There are no press releases regarding a re-location of operations. In January 2021 the Douglas site is now up for sale confirming the site has closed.

Even with the Cheltenham site closed the aftermarket side of the business was moved to Ransomes Jacobsen site in Ipswich so the support for the Douglas vehicles in the field can continue.
