= The Queen's Award for Enterprise: International Trade (Export) (1983) =

The Queen's Award for Enterprise: International Trade (Export) (1983) was awarded on 21 April 1983, by Queen Elizabeth II.

== Recipients ==
The following organisations were awarded this year.

- Acrow PLC, London, W12
- R. P. Adam Ltd, Selkirk
- Airwork Ltd, Christchurch, Dorset
- The Water Specialities and Services Business of Albright and Wilson Ltd, Warley, West Midlands
- Allied Colloids Ltd, Bradford, West Yorkshire
- Amersham International PLC, Amersham, Buckinghamshire
- The Export Division of Anglia Canners Ltd, Rickmansworth, Hertfordshire
- A. and P. Appledore International Ltd, Killingworth, Newcastle-Upon-Tyne
- Architects Co-Partnership Incorporated, Potters Bar, Hertfordshire
- Atlas Converting Equipment Ltd, Kempston, Bedfordshire
- Audio Kinetics (UK) Ltd, Borehamwood, Hertfordshire
- B.K.S. Surveys Ltd, Coleraine, Co. Londonderry
- Badalex Ltd, Weybridge, Surrey
- Balfour Beatty, Ltd, Thornton Heath, Surrey
- Arthur Bell and Sons PLC, Perth
- Biwater Treatment Ltd, Dorking, Surrey
- The Aircraft Group of British Aerospace PLC, Kingston-Upon-Thames, Surrey
- The Computer and Telecommunications Department of British Airways, Hounslow, Middlesex
- Carbolite Furnaces Ltd, Sheffield
- Carreras Rothmans Ltd, Basildon, Essex
- The Chubb Fire Vehicles Division of Chubb Fire Security Ltd, Sunbury-on-Thames, Middlesex
- Coin Controls Ltd, Oldham, Lancashire
- Compton Webb Group Marketing Ltd, Newport, Gwent
- Costain International Ltd, London, SE1
- The Automotive Products Division of the Fabrics Product Group of Courtaulds PLC, Worsley, Manchester
- Crisp Malting Ltd, Fakenham, Norfolk
- Cummins Engine Company Ltd, Darlington, Co. Durham
- Curtis (Wool) Holdings Ltd, Keighley, West Yorkshire
- Dale Electric of Great Britain Ltd, Filey, North Yorkshire
- Darlington and Simpson Rolling Mills PLC, Darlington, Co. Durham
- Databit Ltd, Northampton
- Davy McKee (Sheffield) Ltd, Sheffield
- Dawson International PLC, Kinross, Tayside
- Thomas De La Rue and Company Ltd, Basingstoke, Hampshire
- Derwent Publications Ltd, London, WC1
- Dormer Underwriting Agencies Ltd, London, EC3
- Eilers and Wheeler (UK) Ltd, London, EC1
- Elco Power Plant Ltd, Tadcaster, North Yorkshire
- Euromoney Publications Ltd, London, EC4
- Exploration Consultants Ltd, Henley-on-Thames, Oxfordshire
- Express Dairy UK Ltd, South Ruislip, Middlesex
- Fabrikat Industries Ltd, Nottingham
- The Re-inforcements/CemFIL Division of Fibreglass Ltd, St. Helen's, Merseyside
- Foster Wheeler World Services Ltd, Reading, Berkshire
- GEC Electrical Projects Ltd, Rugby, Warwickshire
- Gaeltec Ltd, Dunvegan, Isle of Skye
- Michael Gerson Ltd, London, N20
- Glantre Engineering Ltd, Wembley, Middlesex
- Griffin-Woodhouse Ltd, Warley, West Midlands
- Guinness Overseas Ltd, London, NW10
- Harrison Bros. (Sanitary Engineers) Ltd, Ilkley, West Yorkshire
- Hosking Equipment Ltd, Melton Constable, Norfolk
- The Hughes Tool Division of Hughes Tool Company Ltd, Belfast
- Insight International Tours Ltd, London, SW1
- Intergen Beauty Products Ltd, Eastbourne, East Sussex
- Investment Insurance International (Managers) Ltd, London, EC3
- T. W. Kempton Ltd, Leicester
- Kurvers International Supply Services Ltd, London, SW3
- Land and Marine Engineering (Overseas) Ltd, Wirral, Merseyside
- Lasgo Exports Ltd, London, NW10
- The Scammell Motor Plant of Leyland Vehicles Ltd, Watford, Hertfordshire
- Liquid Gas Equipment Ltd, Loanhead, Midlothian
- Lofthouse of Fleetwood Ltd, Fleetwood, Lancashire
- Lovaux Ltd, Bracknell, Berkshire
- McCorquodale Machine Systems Ltd, Crewe, Cheshire
- Marconi Avionics Ltd, Rochester, Kent
- Robert Matthew, Johnson-Marshall and Partners, Edinburgh
- May and Baker Ltd, Rainham, Essex
- Metier Management Systems Ltd, London, NW10
- Multispec Ltd, Wheldrake, York
- The Horseley Bridge Unit of NEI Thompson Ltd, Tipton, West Midlands
- Ocean Inchcape Ltd, London, EC3
- Oxford Medical Systems Ltd, Abingdon, Oxfordshire
- Pauls and Sandars Ltd, Ipswich, Suffolk
- Petbow Ltd, Sandwich, Kent
- Presspart Manufacturing Ltd, Blackburn, Lancashire
- The Electronic Warfare Division of Racal-Decca Defence Systems (Radar) Ltd, Chessington, Surrey
- Racal-Tacticom Ltd, Reading, Berkshire
- Rimark Soft Drinks Ltd, Wellingborough, Northamptonshire
- The Buckeye Company Division of South Western Chicks (Warren) Ltd, Hempsted, Gloucestershire
- The Submarine Systems Division of Standard Telephones and Cables PLC, London, SE10
- Hugh Steeper (Roehampton) Ltd, London, SW15
- Technicare International Ltd, Newbury, Berkshire
- Technitube Pipe and Steel (UK) Ltd, Horsham, West Sussex
- Tecquipment Ltd, Nottingham
- Transunits Ltd, Thetford, Norfolk
- United Medical Enterprises Ltd, London, SW1
- Wellman Furnaces Ltd, Warley, West Midlands
- Woods of Windsor Ltd, Windsor, Berkshire
- YRM Partnership, London, EC1
