= The Queen's Award for Enterprise: Innovation (Technology) (2006) =

The Queen's Award for Enterprise: Innovation (Technology) (2006) was awarded on 21 April 2006, by Queen Elizabeth II.

== Recipients ==
The following organisations were awarded this year.

- ACO Technologies plc of Shefford, Bedfordshire for ACO Qmax system for surface water management.
- AD Holdings plc of Warrington, Cheshire for the mobile CCTV system TransVu.
- AESSEAL plc of Rotherham, South Yorkshire for magTecta dual face magnetic bearing isolator.
- Angel Technology Ltd of Farnham, Surrey for miniCol – a healthy cheese alternative proven to reduce cholesterol.
- Ardmel Automation Ltd of Glenrothes, Fife for thread-free ultrasonic construction project for the garment industry.
- Atlas Copco Construction & Mining Ltd of Hemel Hempstead, Hertfordshire for cobra two stroke, hand held vibration reduced jack hammers.
- Balcan Engineering Limited of Horncastle, Lincolnshire for waste lamp recycling plant.
- Bells of Lazonby Limited of Penrith, Cumbria for production of quality gluten-, wheat- and dairy-free products.
- Berghaus Limited of Sunderland, Tyne and Wear for design and marketing of outdoor clothing,‘rucsacs’ and footwear.
- Biocolor Ltd of Newtownabbey, County for rapid, easy-to-use, collagen assay.
- Bradley Doublelock Ltd of Bingley, West Yorkshire for auto-reverse hydraulic disc brake system.
- Citation plc of Knutsford, Cheshire Management systems to enable for sMEs to comply with.
- Contact Lens Precision Laboratories Limited (trading as UltraVision CLPL) of Leighton Buzzard, Bedfordshire for SAM and UltraWave technology.
- Doyle & Tratt Products Ltd of Horsham, West Sussex for energy saving and pollution reducing fluorescent lamps, dimmer switches and other decorative electrical accessories.
- ELG Haniel Metals Ltd of Sheffield, South Yorkshire for densified stainless steel scrap.
- e2v Technologies of Chelmsford, Essex for sensors which enable enhanced imaging across all light levels and spectrum.
- EnviroSystems (UK) Ltd of Barton, Preston, Lancashire for envirobed – livestock bedding developed using short fibres from recycled newsprint.
- Exasoft Plc of Coventry, Warwickshire for Mortgage fundamentals - the recalculation/ construction of mortgage accounts.
- FT Technologies Ltd of Teddington, Middlesex for wind and airflow sensors, featuring patented acoustic resonance technology
- Fox Brothers & Co Ltd of Wellington, Somerset for laser scanning of textiles and marketing the archive concept over an e-commerce system to create an in-house design studio.
- Glencairn Crystal Studio Limited of East Kilbride, Glasgow The Glencairn Whisky Glass.
- Greenvale AP Ltd of Chatteris, Cambridgeshire ‘Restrain for system’ for the production and maintenance of a stable atmosphere.
- Hadley Industries plc of Smethwick, West Midlands for ultraSTEEL - a unique method of improving the performance of roll formed metal sections.
- Haldane (UK) Limited of Glenrothes, Fife, Scotland for specialist timber machining.
- Halyard (M & I) Limited of Whaddon, Salisbury, for marine exhaust silencers.
- Hambleside Danelaw Limited of Waterlooville, Hampshire for insulator translucent polyester (GRP) rooflight.
- Kensington Mortgages of London W2 a specialist mortgage lender to those who have difficulty obtaining loans from main providers.
- Lifelines Ltd of Stockbridge, Hampshire for Trackit Ambulatory EEG Recorder.
- MCL Software Ltd of Southport, Merseyside for advanced fraud prevention solutions (HUNTER) for the financial services, insurance, telecommunications and public sector.
- Mmic eod limited of Waterlooville, Hampshire for specialist bespoke engineering for the defence and emergency services market.
- MSA Engineering Systems Limited of Thurmaston, Leicester for CNC wirelaying systems for the manufacture of electrofusion fittings.
- Multimedia Mapping Ltd (trading as Multimap.com) of London EC1 for global on-line mapping and location-based services.
- Precision Polymer Engineering Limited of Blackburn, Lancashire for Perlast G67P perfluoroelastomer – a high performance nano-filled elastomer material.
- Reid Lifting Limited of Chepstow, Monmouthshire, for PORTA-GANTRY lightweight portable gantry system.
- Renishaw plc of Wotton-under-Edge for NC1 and nC4 non-contact tool setting systems.
- James Robinson Ltd of Huddersfield, West Yorkshire for photochromic molecules for ophthalmic lenses and novel applications.
- Safe and Sound Lighting Limited of Alvechurch, Birmingham for sNAPLITE - recessed downlighter with inbuilt fire and acoustic protection with low air leakage.
- Siemens Communications of Milton Keynes for HiPath personal communications portal.
- Smiths Aerospace - Electronic Systems, Cheltenham of Cheltenham, Gloucestershire for their Remote Interface Unit (RIU) product family – functionally flexible, low-cost ‘building blocks’ for vehicle system architectures.
- Spinnaker International Ltd of Saltash, Cornwall for the iBox cash in transit protection system.
- Tilsatec, a division of Sirdar Spinning Ltd of Wakefield, West Yorkshire for steel reinforced textile materials.
- Timsons Limited of Kettering, Northamptonshire for the ZMR book press for printing books.
- Ulster Carpet Mills (Holdings) Limited of Craigavon, County Armagh, for manufacturing technique for woven carpet.
- Velux Company Ltd of Glenrothes East, Fife, for the Velux design services.
- Waterside Manufacturing Limited (trading as Englands) of Birmingham for safety jackets and vests.
- Whitbybird Ltd of London W1 for multi-disciplinary engineering skills and solutions.
- Wolfson Microelectronics plc of Edinburgh, Scotland for WM9713L - highly integrated audio semiconductor device for advanced multimedia mobile phones.
- E. Wood Limited of Northallerton, North Yorkshire for Copon Hycote 169HB - rapid setting polymeric lining for rehabilitation of drinking water pipelines.
