= Vegware =

Scottish packaging manufacturer

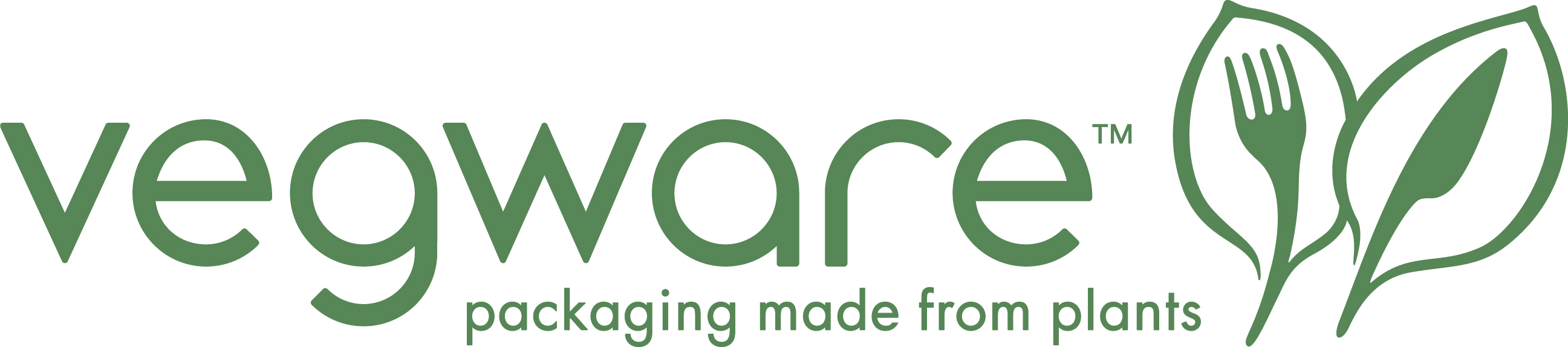
- Company type: Manufacturer
- Industry: Packaging
- Founded: 2006, Edinburgh, Scotland
- Founder: Joe Frankel
- Headquarters: Edinburgh, Scotland & Huntington Beach, California, US
- Area served: Worldwide
- Products: Compostable foodservice packaging, Plant-based catering disposables, Disposable food packaging
- Number of employees: 80 - 100
- Website: vegware.com vegwareus.com/us

Vegware is a manufacturer of plant-based and compostable catering disposables, founded by Joe Frankel in Edinburgh in 2006. In 2020, the company was Scotland's fourth fastest growing private company in the Sunday Times Fast Track 100, with an annual sales rise over three years of 44.58%.

== History ==
Vegware is sold in over 70 countries, with growing global distribution. Headquartered in Scotland, it has bases in the EU, US, Hong Kong and Australia. Its US headquarters, founded in June 2016, is in Huntington Beach, California, taking the company back to where Frankel first had the idea for Vegware.

Vegware packaging is made using renewable, lower carbon, reclaimed or recycled materials, and it is designed to be commercially composted with food waste where accepted. Where there is no access to suitable composting, used products should be placed in general waste.

== Work with the waste sector ==
Its UK and US-based Environmental teams work with the waste sector to provide trade waste collections. Launched in 2020, this is the first large-scale compostables collection service, and was highlighted by the Ellen MacArthur Foundation as an example of upstream innovation for packaging. In 2021, Paper Round installed the UK's first sorting line for compostables to increase collection capacity and output quality for composting. Vegware also runs its own Close the Loop composting collection service in Scotland. Vegware has partnered with recycling company First Mile since 2019 to offer a Vegware RecycleBox, a UK-wide courier-led returns service for used Vegware packaging.

In the US, Vegware partnered with food waste, recycling and food donation partners to provide a zero-waste plan for the 2018 Annual Airports Going Green conference. Other countries have reported equal success in composting Vegware; at a forestry event in Belgium, a festival in Hungary and carnival in Trinidad and Tobago, and for district governmental gardens in Estonia.

== Awards ==
It received the Queen's Award for Innovation in 2016. In 2019, Vegware was one of ten businesses shortlisted for the "Best of VIBES", in the Scottish Environment Business Awards, for their Close the Loop composting collection Scheme in Scotland.

The company won the "Innovations in Packaging award" at the 2018 Footprint Awards, for their on-product Green Leaf band design and range. In 2021, Vegware was ranked as Scotland's fastest growing exporter, 27th in the UK, by the Sunday Times HSBC International Track 200.

In the 12 months ending January 2019 its turnover was £32.2 million.
