= Hadley Group =

British cold rolled steel manufacturer

Hadley Industries Plc
- Industry: Cold Roll Forming
- Founded: 17 January 1964; 62 years ago
- Founder: Philip Hadley
- Headquarters: Smethwick, West Midlands, UK
- Revenue: $193.79 million
- Owner: Stewart Towe
- Website: www.hadleygroup.com

The Hadley Group is a privately owned multi-million pound British company, founded in 1964 by Dennis Phillips, Arthur Evans and Philip Hadley, which is a large producer of cold rolled steel sections and allied products. The company operates from purpose-built manufacturing facilities in the United Kingdom, Dubai, Netherlands, Thailand and a Joint Venture in the USA.

== Company ==
The Hadley Group headquarters is in Smethwick. The company also has bases in the United Kingdom, Thailand, Dubai, and the Netherlands and conducts business in 36 countries covering 5 continents. In 2018, the company employed more than 600 people worldwide.

== Awards and recognitions ==
The company was awarded the Queen's Award for Enterprise (now called the King's Award for Enterprise following the coronation of King Charles III): Innovation, in 2014.

== UltraSTEEL® process ==
Hadley developed the UltraSTEEL dimpling process in 1982 and won the 2006 and 2014 Queen's Award for Enterprise: Innovation.

The process offers an advanced industrial manufacturing technique that transforms plain steel sheets into high-performance, dimpled steel products. This process increases the energy absorption capabilities of the steel, and can further optimise its performance by adjusting the depth of dimpling. The UltraSTEEL process utilizes a pair of rolls with specially shaped teeth that deform the plain sheet from both sides before undergoing traditional cold roll forming. This innovative approach has resulted in the increased use of dimpled steel products in a variety of applications such as wall studs, framing, roofing members, corrugated panels, vineyard posts, and window and door reinforcement.
