= The Queen's Award for Enterprise: Innovation (Technology) (1980) =

The Queen's Award for Enterprise: Innovation (Technology) (1980) was awarded on 21 April 1980, by Queen Elizabeth II.

== Recipients ==
The following organisations were awarded this year.

- Analytical Instruments Ltd of Cambridge for explosives detecting doorway (ENTRY-SCAN).
- Cape Boards and Panels, Ltd of Uxbridge, Middlesex for asbestos-free, fire resistant boards.
- DJB Engineering Ltd of Peterlee, Co. Durham for articulated dump trucks.
- Ferranti Electronics Ltd of Chadderton, Oldham, Greater Manchester for uncommitted logic arrays for microelectronics applications.
- Matthew Hall Engineering Ltd of London, W1 for design of production facilities for Claymore " A" Platform.
- The Semiconductors Division of ITT Industries Ltd of Foots-Cray, Sidcup, Kent for random access memories.
- Linotype-Paul Ltd of Cheltenham, Gloucestershire for their digital phototypesetter.
- Lion Laboratories Ltd of Cardiff, South Glamorgan for analytical instruments using fuel cell sensors.
- Micro Consultants Ltd of Caterham, Surrey for electronic video image processing systems (INTELLECT).
- Monotype International Ltd of Salfords, Redhill, Surrey for laser-driven optical system for phototypesetting.
- Morgan Refractories Ltd of Neston, South Wirral, Cheshire for refractory protection (INSULOQ).
- National Semiconductor (UK) Ltd of Greenock, Renfrewshire for integrated circuit for Dolby " B " type noise reduction.
- Oxford Instruments Ltd of Osney Mead, Oxford for superconducting magnet systems for nuclear magnetic resonance spectroscopy.
- Racal Safety Ltd of Wembley, Middlesex for ventilated helmet giving protection against nuisance dusts, combined with head and eye/face protection.
- Renishaw Electrical Ltd of Wotton-under-Edge, Gloucestershire for probes for use in measuring equipment and machine tools.
- Rothamsted Experimental Station of Harpenden, Hertfordshire for photostable synthetic pyrethroids.
- The Howson-Algraphy Group of Vickers Ltd of Leeds, West Yorkshire for lithographic printing.

== See also ==
- The Queen's Award for Enterprise: International Trade (Export) (1980)
