= The Queen's Award for Enterprise: Innovation (2016) =

The winners of the Queen's Award for Enterprise for Innovation in 2016 were announced on 21 April, by Businesses Secretary Sajid Javid. It marked the 50th anniversary of the awards scheme as well as the Queen's 90th birthday.

There were 92 winners in the Innovation category in 2016. Notable recipients include:

- JCB Ltd
- M Squared Lasers Limited
- Vegware
- Bejay Mulenga
- Plumis
