= The Queen's Award for Enterprise: Innovation (Technology) (2003) =

The Queen's Award for Enterprise: Innovation (Technology) (2003) was awarded on 21 April 2003, by Queen Elizabeth II.

== Recipients ==
The following organisations were awarded this year.

- ACIS of Loudwater, Buckinghamshire for GPS based real time information for passenger transport users and operators.
- Activa Healthcare Ltd of Burton-upon-Trent, Staffordshire for Medical compression hosiery, bandages and training to prevent and treat venous disease.
- Antenna Audio Ltd of London SE16 for Technology for the self-guided audio tour market.
- Avecia Biotechnology of Blackley, Manchester for Large-scale production of DNA medicines.
- BAE Systems, Inertial Systems Division of Plymouth, Devon for Micro-machined silicon gyro for use in inertial systems in commercial and defence applications.
- Blease Medical Equipment Limited of Chesham, Buckinghamshire for Advanced anaesthetic ventilator for both paediatric and adult patients within the operating theatre.
- Bristow Helicopters Ltd of Redhill, Surrey for Developments to the fleet of search and rescue helicopters.
- Burall PlasTec Limited of Wisbech, Cambridgeshire for Glued polypropylene packaging.
- Cognitive Drug Research Ltd of Reading, Berkshire for Specialist systems for assessing mental functioning in human clinical trials.
- Controlled Therapeutics (Scotland) Ltd of East Kilbride, Glasgow, Scotland for Pharmaceutical hydrogel for childbirth.
- Delcam plc of Birmingham for ‘ArtCAM’ software for designing intricately decorated products.
- DuPont Teijin Films UK Limited of Wilton, Middlesbrough for Melinex@ Core 1 laminated polyester film card.
- Dyson Ltd of Malmesbury, Wiltshire for Development of first dual cyclone bagless vacuum cleaner and continuous development of cyclone technology.
- EMB Consultancy of Epsom, Surrey for Actuarial services, risk analysis and financial modelling.
- Fairbanks Environmental Ltd of Skelmersdale, Lancashire for Wetstock management services.
- Hainsworth Protective Fabrics, a trading division of A. W. Hainsworth and Sons Ltd of Pudsey, West Yorkshire for TI-technologyTM, innovative textile manufacturing system.
- Huntleigh Healthcare Ltd, Diagnostic Products Division of Cardiff, Wales for Dopplex@ Assist range handheld electronic foetal monitor.
- ID Business Solutions Limited t/a IDBS of Guildford, Surrey for The ActivityBase software suite for data management in drug discovery research.
- IFS Global Logistics of Antrim, County Antrim, Northern Ireland for Vendorvillage.com - virtual warehousing system.
- INEOS Silicas Ltd, Desiccants of Warrington, Cheshire for Sorbsil@ CHAMELEONTMC desiccant indicating silica gel.
- Intelligent Security Ltd of Bordon, Hampshire for Video Smoke Detection (VSD). A camera based fire detection system.
- Kodak Polychrome Graphics of Morley, Leeds for Electra Excel Thermal Printing Plate.
- Stewart Linford Chairmaker Ltd of High Wycombe, Buckinghamshire for Making and selling high quality furniture, especially limited editions.
- The London Clearing House Limited of London EC3 for LCH SwapClear, the global central counterparty clearing service for OTC-traded interbank interest rate swaps.
- Marks and Spencer p.l.c. - Menswear Business Unit of London W1 for ‘Tailoring Machine Washable’ ultra easy care formal garments.
- Architects Marks Barfield of London SW4 for the London Eye.
- McCain Foods (GB) Ltd of Scarborough, North Yorkshire for McCain Home Fries Oven Chips.
- mi2g Ltd of London SW11 for Bespoke Security ArchitectureTM.
- Micropathology Ltd of Coventry, Warwickshire for Application of techniques for rapid diagnosis of organisms involved in infection.
- Morgan Group Technology Ltd of Stourport-on-Severn, Worcestershire for Bio-soluble high temperature insulation products.
- Oxford Instruments Superconductivity Limited of Abingdon, Oxfordshire for 900 MHz superconducting magnets for NMR applications in life science and drug discovery.
- Paragon Labels Limited of Spalding, Lincolnshire for The production of tamper proof sleeve-look self-adhesive labels - ‘Wrap Around’.
- PayPoint Ltd of Welwyn Garden City, Hertfordshire for Consumer retail payment services.
- PerkinElmer (UK) Ltd, Optoelectronics Division of Wokingham, Berkshire for FD440/CHROMOS 11 portable dispersion tester.
- Promethean Ltd of Blackburn, Lancashire for ACTIVboardPlus, a whole group teaching and learning system.
- RFX Limited of Livingston, West Lothian, Scotland for Precision crystal oscillators.
- STG Aerospace Ltd of Swaffham, Norfolk for SafTGlo photoluminescent emergency evacuation guidance system.
- The Sporting Exchange Ltd t/a Betfair.com of London W6 for Betting exchange.
- Structural Statics Limited of Winchester, Hampshire for Controlling risk by advanced structural monitoring.
- Stylographics Ltd of Watford, Hertfordshire for Display and point-of-sale graphics to the retail, exhibition and museum sectors.
- Thermal Ceramics UK Ltd of Bromborough, Wirral for Bio-soluble high temperature insulation products.
- TRACERCO part of Johnson Matthey Plc of Billingham, Cleveland for TRACERCO ProfilerTM for the measurement and control of multi-phase separation vessels.
- Transdek UK Ltd of Retford, Nottinghamshire for Hydraulically powered loading system for loading goods in vehicles.
- Translift Engineering Limited of Redditch, Worcestershire for Forklift truck design.
- Travel Counsellors Ltd of Bolton for Holiday booking from home via personal travel advisors.
- Trendsetter Home Furnishings Ltd of Oldham for Duvet that can be washed in a domestic machine.
- Tripos Receptor Research Ltd of Bude, Cornwall for Informatics driven discovery process to accelerate the finding of new drugs.
- UWG Group Ltd of Norwich, Norfolk for Suspended Well Abandonment Tool (SWATTM).
- Worthington-Richardson Designs of Saundersfoot, Pembrokeshire, Wales for Surgical gloves.
- Zerpetz Ltd t/a Arrowvale Electronics of Redditch, Worcestershire for on-train monitoring recorder.
- Zetechtics Ltd of Kirkbymoorside, North Yorkshire for Jupiter subsea control system for offshore oilfield intervention tasks.
