= The Queen's Award for Enterprise: International Trade (Export) (2006) =

The Queen's Award for Enterprise: International Trade (Export) (2006) was awarded on 21 April 2006, by Queen Elizabeth II.

== Recipients ==
The following organisations were awarded this year.

- 20 Essex Street of London WC2 for legal services
- Abbey Masterbatch Ltd of Ashton-under-Lyne, for Masterbatch and pigment dispersions.
- Aerotron Limited of Crawley, West Sussex for aircraft component parts and services.
- Aircom International Limited of Redhill, Surrey for telecom software consultancy and training.
- Albourne Partners of London SW8 for advice to investors in hedge funds.
- Allam Marine Limited of Hull for Industrial and marine generators, controls and switchgear
- Aura Corporation UK Ltd of Beaconsfield, for market research services and channel marketing.
- Baillie Gifford Overseas Limited of Edinburgh, Scotland for investment management.
- Capital Valves Ltd of Wembley, Middlesex for valves and ancillary equipment to the oil, petro-chemical and chemical industries.
- Ceramicoat Tunnel Linings and Coatings Ltd of Taunton, Somerset for protective coating systems for tunnels.
- The Change Group International Plc of London W1 for foreign currency services.
- Colchester Global Investors Limited of London W1 for investment management.
- ColorMatrix Europe Ltd of Knowsley, Merseyside for liquid colourants and additives for the plastics industry.
- Conseco International Ltd of London W1 for multidisciplinary technical consultancy services for projects in infrastructure and the built environment.
- Corus Special Profiles of Saltburn-by-the-Sea for special shaped steel profiles.
- Craig Group Limited of Aberdeen, Scotland for global shipowners energy services, oilfield support vessels, procurement, catering, subsea survey and mooring equipment.
- John Crane UK Ltd., Turbomachinery Division of Slough, Berkshire for gas lubricated mechanical seals and related products and services.
- DSG international plc of Hemel Hempstead, for electrical appliances.
- Dage Precision Industries Ltd of Aylesbury, Buckinghamshire for test and inspection systems.
- Data Connection Ltd of Enfield, Middlesex for communications and telephony systems including protocol stacks, unified messaging, conferencing and VoIP Class 5 switch
- Jeffrey Davies and Davies Limited of Dunton Green, Sevenoaks, for pork, poultry, lamb and other meat products.
- Diagnostic Monitoring Systems Ltd of Glasgow, Scotland for UHF partial discharge monitoring systems.
- Diamond Consulting Services Ltd of Aylesbury, Buckinghamshire for patented software for vehicle detection and classification.
- Dorset Cereals of Dorchester, Dorset for breakfast cereals.
- Dyson James Ltd of Malmesbury, Wiltshire for vacuum cleaners.
- The European Lawyer Limited of London W1 for a legal magazine and comparative business law text books.
- FT Technologies Ltd of Teddington, Middlesex for wind and airflow sensors, featuring patented acoustic resonance technology
- Falmouth Fishselling Company Limited (Falfish) of Redruth, Cornwall for fresh and frozen fish and shellfish
- Fastalloys Ltd of Bradford, West Yorkshire for superalloy/stainless steel sheet and strip.
- FilmLight Ltd of London W1 for digital film equipment for the motion picture industry.
- Fintec Crushing & Screening Ltd of Ballygawley, Dungannon, County Tyrone for mobile crushing and screening equipment plus mobile concrete block machines
- Firmdale Hotels PLC of London SW7 for hotel services.
- Forest Press Hydraulics Ltd of Cinderford, Gloucestershire for concrete pressing machinery.
- John Foster of England Limited of Bradford, West Yorkshire for worsted and natural fibre fabrics.
- Gooch & Housego PLC of Ilminster, Somerset for acousto-optic devices and precision optics.
- Goodwin Steel Castings Ltd of Hanley, Stoke-on-Trent, Staffordshire for machined and fabricated alloy and super alloy steel castings and assemblies
- Graff Diamonds International Limited of London W1 for diamond and gem set jewellery.
- Grafton Recruitment International Plc of Belfast, Northern Ireland for recruitment agency.
- Grant Macdonald (Silversmiths) Limited of London SE1 for ornamental gold and silverwork.
- Guidance Navigation Limited of Leicester for navigation sensor systems for automatic vessel control.
- James Halstead plc of Radcliffe, Greater Manchester for commercial vinyl floor coverings.
- Peter Hambro Mining Plc of London SW1 for gold mining and exploration.
- Hatsu Marine Limited of London NW1 for container shipping services.
- The Henley Management College of Henley-on-Thames, for management education.
- Hughes Safety Showers Ltd of Bredbury, Stockport, for emergency safety showers, eyebaths and decontamination showers.
- IDTechEx Ltd of Swaffham Bulbeck, Cambridge for consultancy services.
- Immunodiagnostic Systems Limited of Boldon, Tyne and Wear for medical diagnostic test kits.
- IX Europe Plc of London W14 for datacentre services.
- JCB Earthmovers Ltd of Cheadle, Stoke-on-Trent for wheeled loading shovels and articulated dump trucks.
- JCB Heavy Products Ltd of Uttoxeter, Staffordshire for tracked and wheeled excavators.
- Keymat Technology Ltd (t/a STORM Interface) of West Drayton, Middlesex for robust data entry devices for installation on unattended public use terminals
- KeyMed (Medical & Industrial Equipment) of Southend-on-Sea, Essex for specialised medical and industrial equipment.
- Langtec Limited of Accrington, Lancashire for insulating products in tubular form.
- Law Business Research Ltd of London W11 for books, websites and magazines on international corporate law and legal services.
- John Lawrie (Aberdeen) Ltd of Altens, Aberdeen, for metal recycling and trading in steel tubulars.
- London College of Accountancy of London SE1 for professional accountancy, undergraduate and postgraduate accountancy, business and management education.
- Malvern Instruments Limited of Malvern, Worcestershire for instruments for particle characterization and rheological testing.
- Melett Limited of Dewsbury, West Yorkshire for turbocharger repair kits and parts for the turbo reconditioning industry.
- Meritmill Ltd of Batley, West Yorkshire for fabric pattern books and shade cards.
- Micron Sprayers Limited of Bromyard, Herefordshire for agricultural spraying equipment.
- Mondrian Investment Partners Limited of London EC2 for investment management.
- Orange Music Electronic Company Limited of Borehamwood, Hertfordshire for musical instrument amplifiers and speaker enclosures.
- Oxford Diffraction Ltd of Abingdon, Oxfordshire for x-ray diffraction equipment.
- Penta Consulting Limited of Wallington, Surrey for information and communication technology recruitment solutions.
- Phosyn plc of Pocklington, York for plant nutrient products.
- Photonic Products Limited of Bishop’s Stortford, for laser diodes and opto-electronic sub-assemblies.
- Playtop Limited of Newark, Nottinghamshire for playground safety surfaces.
- Polymeters Response International Ltd of Winchester, Hampshire for smart electricity meters, payment solutions and energy management systems.
- RFI Global Services Limited of Basingstoke, Hampshire for conformance testing and consultancy services to cellular, wireless, smartcard and electronics industries.
- RJH Trading Ltd of London SW1 for nonferrous metals, scrap, minor metals, ferroalloys, plastics and paper trading.
- Radnor Hills Mineral Water Co. Ltd of Knighton, Powys, Wales for mineral waters and soft drinks.
- John Reid & Sons (Strucsteel) Ltd of Christchurch, Dorset for steel structures for industrial buildings, aircraft hangars, grandstands and multi-storey car parks etc..
- SRK Consulting (UK) Limited of Cardiff, Wales for consulting services to the minerals industry.
- Sangenic International Limited of Cramlington, for nappy disposal system.
- Shape Technology Limited of Christchurch, Dorset for shape and profile measurement equipment and associated products.
- Sondex plc of Yateley, Hampshire for drilling and wireline logging equipment for oil and gas wells.
- Spectrum Technologies Plc of Bridgend, Mid Glamorgan, for laser wire marking systems.
- St Peter's Brewery Co Ltd of Bungay, Suffolk for beers and ales.
- Star Syringe Ltd of Uckfield, East Sussex Licensing the manufacture of the k1 auto-disable syringe.
- StatPro Group plc of London SW19 Financial software and related services
- TRB Limited of St Asaph, Denbighshire for automotive components.
- Wales TRP Sealing Systems Ltd of Hereford for elastomeric gaskets.
- Thermacore Europe Ltd of Ashington, Northumberland for electronics cooling solutions for the telecom, military, medical, computer and industrial markets.
- The University of Nottingham for higher educational and research services
- Victrex Plc of Thornton-Cleveleys, for high performance engineering thermoplastics.
- Wagtech International Ltd of Thatcham, Berkshire for environmental testing equipment.
- Walker Filtration Ltd of Washington, Tyne and Wear for compressed air and gas, vacuum and medical filtration equipment.
- William Data Systems Ltd of East Grinstead, West Sussex for software products.
- F G Wilson (Engineering) Ltd of Larne, County Antrim, for diesel and gas powered electricity generating sets.
- Wogen Titanium Ltd of London SW1 for titanium sponge.
