= The Queen's Award for Enterprise: International Trade (Export) (2003) =

The Queen's Award for Enterprise: International Trade (Export) (2003) was awarded on 21 April 2003, by Queen Elizabeth II.

== Recipients ==
The following organisations were awarded this year.

- ALSTOM Power Ltd Technology Centre of Whetstone, Leicester for Engineering design, test and manufacture of turbines.
- AMEC Group Limited of Northwich, Cheshire for Specialised engineering services.
- Aston Martin Lagonda Limited of Newport Pagnell, Buckinghamshire for Prestigious sports cars, parts and restoration services.
- W Ball & Son Ltd t/a Baltex of Ilkeston, Derbyshire for Warp-knitted textiles.
- Beautimatic International Ltd of Witham, Essex for Perfumes and body sprays.
- Biocatalysts Ltd of Pontypridd, Wales for Enzymes for use in food processing.
- Business Planning and Research Limited t/a BPRI of London SE1 for Market research based consultancy services.
- Clearwater Hampers of Wantage, Oxfordshire for Food and drink hampers.
- Crystalox Limited of Wantage, Oxfordshire for Multicrystalline silicon products for the photovoltaic industry.
- Cyton Biosciences Ltd of Clifton, Bristol for Business consultancy services.
- Dando Drilling International Limited of Littlehampton, West Sussex for Drilling rigs and equipment.
- Dedicated Microcomputers Group Ltd of Swinton, Salford for Digital video multiplex recorders designed to record and manage live images from CCTV systems.
- Diamonite Aircraft Furnishings Ltd of Bristol for Complete aircraft interiors.
- Alan Dick & Company Limited of Cheltenham, Gloucestershire for Integrated radio infrastructure services and products for cellular, broadcast, civilian and military communications.
- e2v technologies Imaging Business Group of Chelmsford, Essex for Intra-oral dental CCD (charge-coupled device) assemblies.
- e2v technologies Therapy Business Group of Chelmsford, Essex for Linear accelerator magnetrons.
- EOC UK Limited of Trafford Park, Manchester for Latex compounds.
- Easypack Limited of Welwyn Garden City, Hertfordshire for Cushion packaging systems.
- Excell Biotech Ltd of Oakbank, Livingston, Scotland for Process development and cGMP manufacture of biopharmaceuticals for early stage clinical trials.
- Fresh Catch Ltd of Peterhead, Aberdeenshire, Scotland for Mackerel, herring and whitefish products.
- HCA International Limited of London W2 for Private healthcare.
- Hayles & Howe Ltd of Bristol for Ornamental plasterwork and scagliola.
- Hibreeds International Limited of Norwich, Norfolk for Poultry hatching eggs.
- History & Heraldry Ltd of Rotherham for Impulse-buy gifts and greeting cards.
- ID Business Solutions Limited t/a IDBS of Guildford, Surrey for Software for life sciences research.
- IPA Energy Consulting Ltd of Edinburgh, Scotland for Design, implementation and support of regulatory frameworks and markets in the electricity and gas sectors.
- W. Jordan (Cereals) Ltd of Biggleswade, Bedfordshire for Breakfast cereals and cereal bars.
- J. Marr (Seafoods) Limited of Hessle, East Yorkshire for Frozen pelagic fish.
- Maviga Limited of Yalding, Maidstone, Kent for Dried edible pulses and other special crops.
- Meridian Medical Technologies Limited of Belfast, Northern Ireland for Medical diagnostic and monitoring devices.
- Middlesex University of London N14 for Higher education at undergraduate and postgraduate levels, research and knowledge transfer.
- Neat Concepts Limited of London N18 for Flexible medium density fibreboard.
- Neomedic Limited of Northwood, Middlesex for Medical disposables.
- No Climb Products Limited of Barnet, Hertfordshire for Test and maintenance products for fire detection systems.
- Omitec Group Limited of Devizes, Wiltshire for Automotive test equipment and support services.
- ORION Clinical Services Limited of Slough, Berkshire for Services in support of drug development for the pharmaceutical and biotechnology sectors.
- Oxford Instruments Plasma Technology Ltd of Yatton, Bristol for Plasma processing and ion beam etching and deposition equipment.
- Passion For Life Healthcare Limited of Epsom, Surrey for Healthcare products.
- Penn Pharmaceutical Services Ltd of Tredegar, Gwent, Wales for Pharmaceutical development and manufacturing services to the international healthcare industry.
- PerkinElmer (U.K.) Ltd, Optoelectronics Division of Wokingham, Berkshire for Fibre optic test instrumentation.
- Pfizer Limited of Sandwich, Kent for Research, development and manufacture of pharmaceutical products.
- Photonic Products Limited of Bishops Stortford, Hertfordshire for Laser diodes and opto-electronic sub-assemblies.
- Precision Antennas Ltd of Stratford-upon-Avon, Warwickshire for Microwave and satellite antennas.
- Rolls-Royce Airlines - Trent Business of Derby for The Trent family of aero engines.
- The Royal Bank of Scotland Group plc of Edinburgh, Scotland for Financial services.
- SHS International Ltd of Liverpool, Merseyside for Specialized clinical nutrition products.
- STG Aerospace Limited of SwaVham, Norfolk for Photoluminescent emergency floorpath marking systems for aircraft.
- Seabait Limited of Ashington, Northumberland for Marine worms.
- Simmons & Simmons of London EC2 for Legal services.
- The Somerset Toiletry Company Ltd of Clutton, Bristol for Toiletries including soaps, drawer liners, candles, room fragrances and skincare.
- Stage Technologies Ltd of London N5 for Theatre automation systems.
- State Street Global Advisors Limited of London SW1 for Investment management.
- Static Control Components (Europe) Ltd of Reading, Berkshire for Components for the re-manufacture of laser cartridges.
- The Television Corporation plc of London W1 for International production and distribution of television programmes and the supply of complete technical facilities to broadcasters.
- Trinity International Services Ltd of Aberdeen, Scotland for OVshore and remote-site catering and hotel-keeping services.
- TTPCom Ltd of Royston, Hertfordshire for Software and hardware designs for mobile devices.
- Turner & Townsend International Ltd of Horsforth, Leeds for Construction and management consultancy services.
- Ultra Electronics Precision Air Systems of Gloucester for Miniature high pressure air compressor systems.
- Univation Limited of Aberdeen, Scotland for Training and consultancy services to industry.
- Vitabiotics Ltd of Wembley, Middlesex for Vitamin supplements and nutraceuticals for specific therapeutic areas, including Omega-H3, Osteocare and Pregnacare.
- Worth Global Style Network Ltd of London W2 for Research and analysis for the fashion and style industries.
- Zeus Aluminium Products Ltd of Dudley, West Midlands for Light-weight aluminium precision sand castings.
