= The Queen's Award for Enterprise: Innovation (Technology) (2001) =

The Queen's Award for Enterprise: Innovation (Technology) (2001) was awarded on 20 April.

== Recipients ==
The following organisations were awarded this year.

- ACO Technologies Plc of Shefford, Bedfordshire for ACO KerbDrain - a combined kerbstone and drainage channel.
- Aircom International of Redhill, Surrey for ENTERPRISE integrated software solution designed for radio network engineering.
- Aireshelta Ltd of Huddersfield, West Yorkshire for Aireshower portable decontamination unit.
- Andel Limited of Huddersfield, West Yorkshire for Floodline 128 leak detection system.
- BBC Research & Development of Tadworth, Surrey for Digital terrestrial television receiver demodulator chip.
- Biomet Merck Ltd of Bridgend, Wales for Oxford Uni-compartmental Knee, Phase 3.
- Bromcom Computers Plc of London SE26 for Wireless registration and reporting systems for schools and colleges.
- Cooke Optics Limited of Thurmaston, Leicester for 35mm lenses for the film industry.
- Debenhams plc - The Wedding Service of London W1 for Multi-channel wedding service, offering gift lists and planning services in-store, on-line or by telephone.
- EME (Electro Medical Equipment) Ltd of Brighton, East Sussex for the provision of neonatal respiratory support.
- Easysoft Limited of Wetherby for Easysoft Data Access.
- Feralco (UK) Ltd of Widnes, Cheshire for Production of new treatment additive for wastewater and paper processing.
- Fish Guidance Systems Ltd of Fawley, Hampshire for Fish guidance system for prevention of fish kill at power stations.
- Forticrete Roofing Products of Leighton Buzzard, for Bedfordshire Gemini concrete roof tile.
- Geneva Technology Limited of Cambourne, Cambridge for Geneva customer billing software for telecommunications.
- Hanovia Ltd of Slough, Berkshire for SuperTOC lamp.
- Joseph Heler Limited of Nantwich, Cheshire for Production of low fat cheese.
- Innovision Research & Technology plc of Wokingham, Berkshire for Datalabel - innovative and low cost RF tag technology.
- Jobserve Ltd of Tiptree, Essex for Job vacancy advertising by e-mail and website.
- LSI Logic (Europe) Ltd of Bracknell, Berkshire for Digital terrestrial television receiver demodulator chip.
- Land Rover - Gaydon Product Development Centre of Gaydon, Warwickshire for Hill descent control system for 4 x 4 vehicles.
- Magiglo Ltd of Broadstairs, Kent for Design of gas fires.
- Melles Griot Limited of Ely, Cambridgeshire for Design and manufacture of nanometric positioning equipment.
- PAV Data Systems Ltd of Windermere, Cumbria for Wireless optical data transmission equipment.
- Pfizer Limited of Sandwich, Kent for Sildenafil (Viagra) for the treatment of erectile dysfunction.
- Polymer Reprocessors Limited of Knowsley, Merseyside for Mechanical compact disc recycling process.
- Biosurgical Research Unit, Surgical Materials Testing Laboratory, Princess of Wales Hospital of Bridgend, Wales for LarvE sterile maggots of Lucilia sericata.
- Process Systems Enterprise Limited of London W6 for gPROMS - advanced process modelling simulation software and optimisation and services.
- QAS Systems Ltd of London SW4 for QuickAddress range of address management software.
- Rotork Controls Ltd of Bath for Rotork IQ electric valve actuator.
- Segnet Ltd of Wickford, Essex for RPM-S RF upstream cross-connect segmentation router for broadband multimedia services.
- Silberline Ltd of Leven, Fife, Scotland for 'Silvet' metal pigment in novel granular form management.
- Solvent Resource Management Limited of Morecambe, Lancashire for Processing and reclamation of containers of waste chemicals.
- Sortex Limited of London E15 for Niagara: a machine for simultaneous colour and shape sorting of fruit and vegetables.
- Titan Airways Limited of Stansted, Essex for Provision of immediate and short notice aircraft availability.
- Tritech International Limited of Westhill, Aberdeenshire, for Scotland SeaKing range of networked subsea tools and sensors.
- UPU Industries Ltd of Dromore, County Down, for Northern Ireland Bale crop conservation technologies.
- Unitec Ceramics Ltd of Stafford for An yttria stabilised zirconia powder for automotive oxygen sensors.
- Urbis Lighting Ltd of Basingstoke, Hampshire for The Sealsafe sealed beam street lighting optic.
- VG Systems Ltd t/a Thermo VG Semicon of East Grinstead, West Sussex for Equipment for the manufacture of advanced semiconductor devices.
- Vicon Motion Systems Limited of Oxford for Systems capturing the 3-dimensional motion of objects, particularly the human body.
- Waterside Manufacturing Limited t/a Englands Safety Equipment of Harborne, Birmingham for Multi-purpose life saving equipment.
