= Shibaura (company) =

Japanese manufacturer

IHI Shibaura Machinery Corporation
- Native name: 株式会社 IHI シバウラ
- Company type: Subsidiary
- Industry: Agricultural machinery
- Founded: 1950; 76 years ago
- Headquarters: Toyosu, Koto-ku, Tokyo, 135-6009, Japan
- Area served: Worldwide
- Key people: Seiichi Daita (President)
- Products: Tractors; Diesel engines; Ozone sterilizers
- Number of employees: 910 (as of March 31, 2018)
- Parent: IHI Corporation
- Website: Official website

IHI Shibaura Machinery Corporation (株式会社 IHI シバウラ, Kabushiki-gaisha IHI Shibaura) or Shibaura is a Japanese agricultural machinery manufacturer owned by IHI Corporation. The company is one of Japan’s leading suppliers of small tractors and diesel engines.

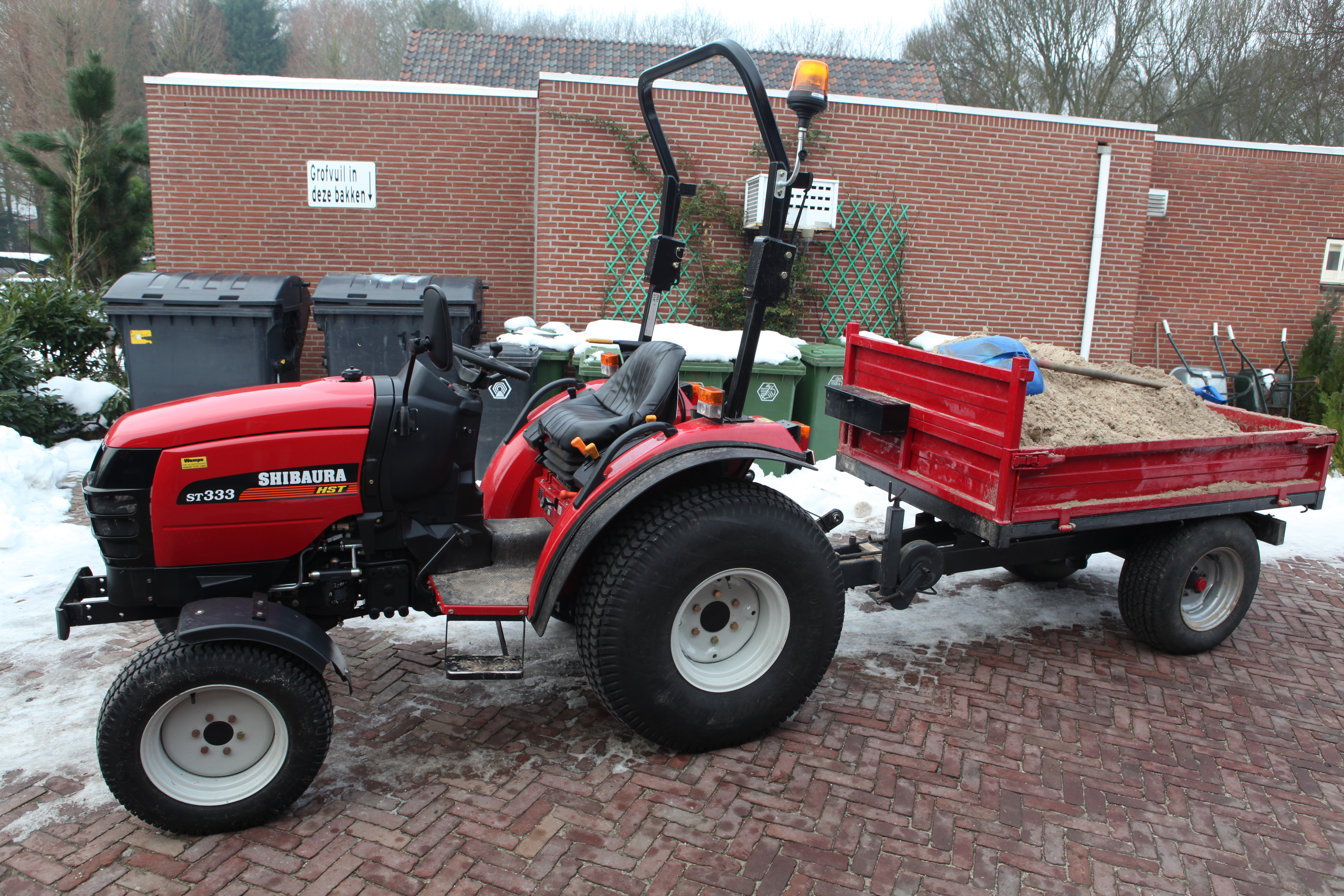
Shibaura ST 333 in December 2010

== History ==
The company originated in 1942 and began making engines and tractors from 1951. In 1973 Shibaura made an agreement with Ford to build a small tractor, the Ford 1000, using Ford's specifications and styling. Subsequently Shibaura made other models of Ford tractors, like the Ford 1600 and 2110, and continued to build small tractors even after Ford acquired New Holland. The company also produced Yanmar tractors and STIHL power tools.

Some of the engines are made by a joint venture company, Perkins Shibaura Engines, founded in October 1994 and opened in 1996. In April 2005, the company won The Queen's Award for Enterprise: International Trade (Export) (2005).

The joint venture company has manufacturing sites in three countries: the UK, the US and China. The company's original products was the Perkins 100 Series engine but later their offerings became more diverse, including the Perkins 400 series engine, manufactured first in 2001.

== Structure ==
The company has three manufacturing locations in Japan, with its main 35-acre factory in Matsumoto in Nagano Prefecture, in the centre of Japan.

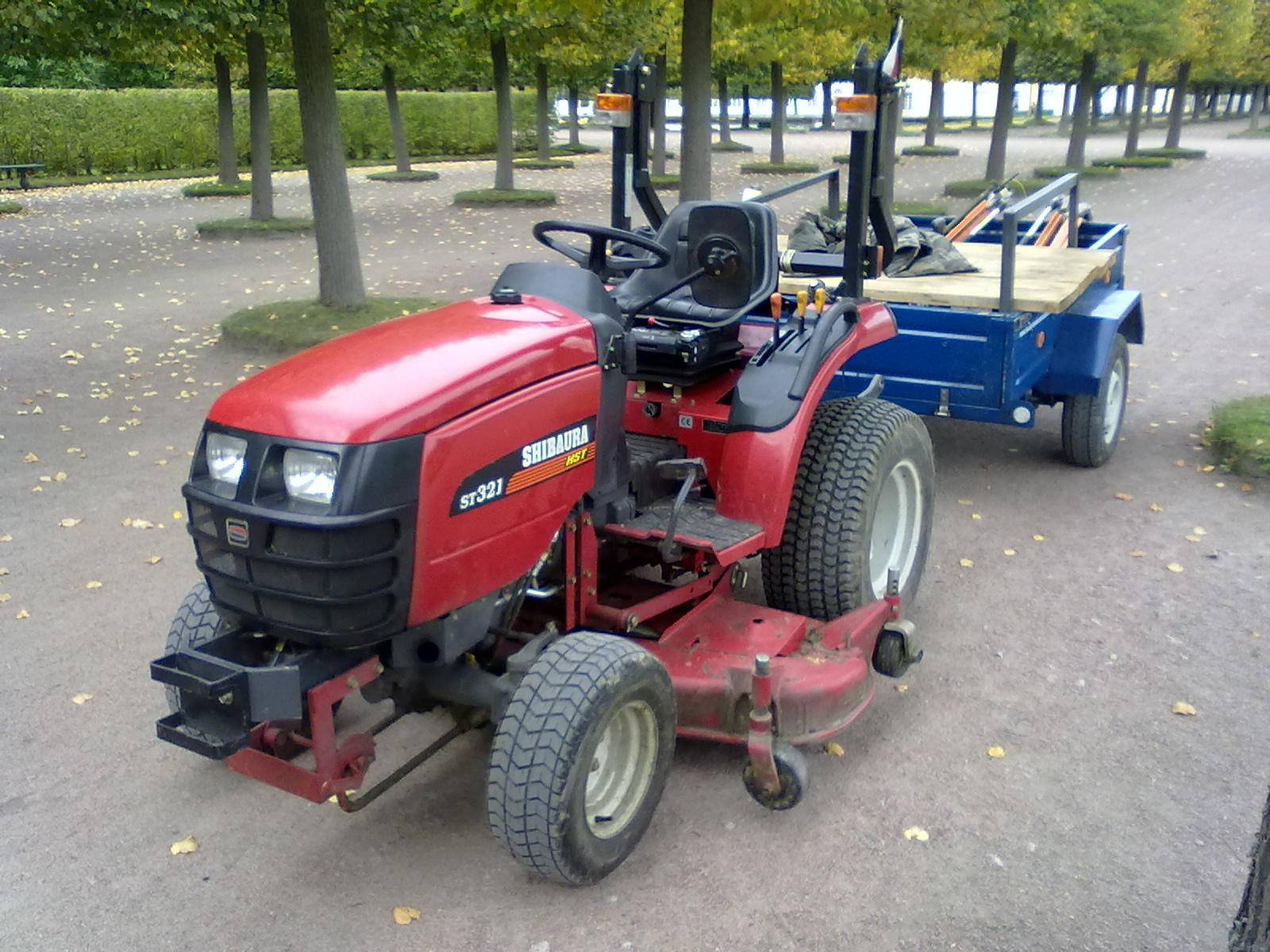
Shibaura ST 321 in September 2011

== See also ==
- List of tractor manufacturers
