= The Queen's Award for Export Achievement (1979) =

The Queen's Award for Enterprise: International Trade (Export) (1979) was awarded on 21 April 1979, by Queen Elizabeth II.

== Recipients ==
The following organisations were awarded this year.

- Alenco Flex, Brimsdown, Enfield. Plastics. Received by Vincent Campbell, Deputy Managing Director 1979
- Aquascutum
