= Glencairn whisky glass =

Style of drinking cup

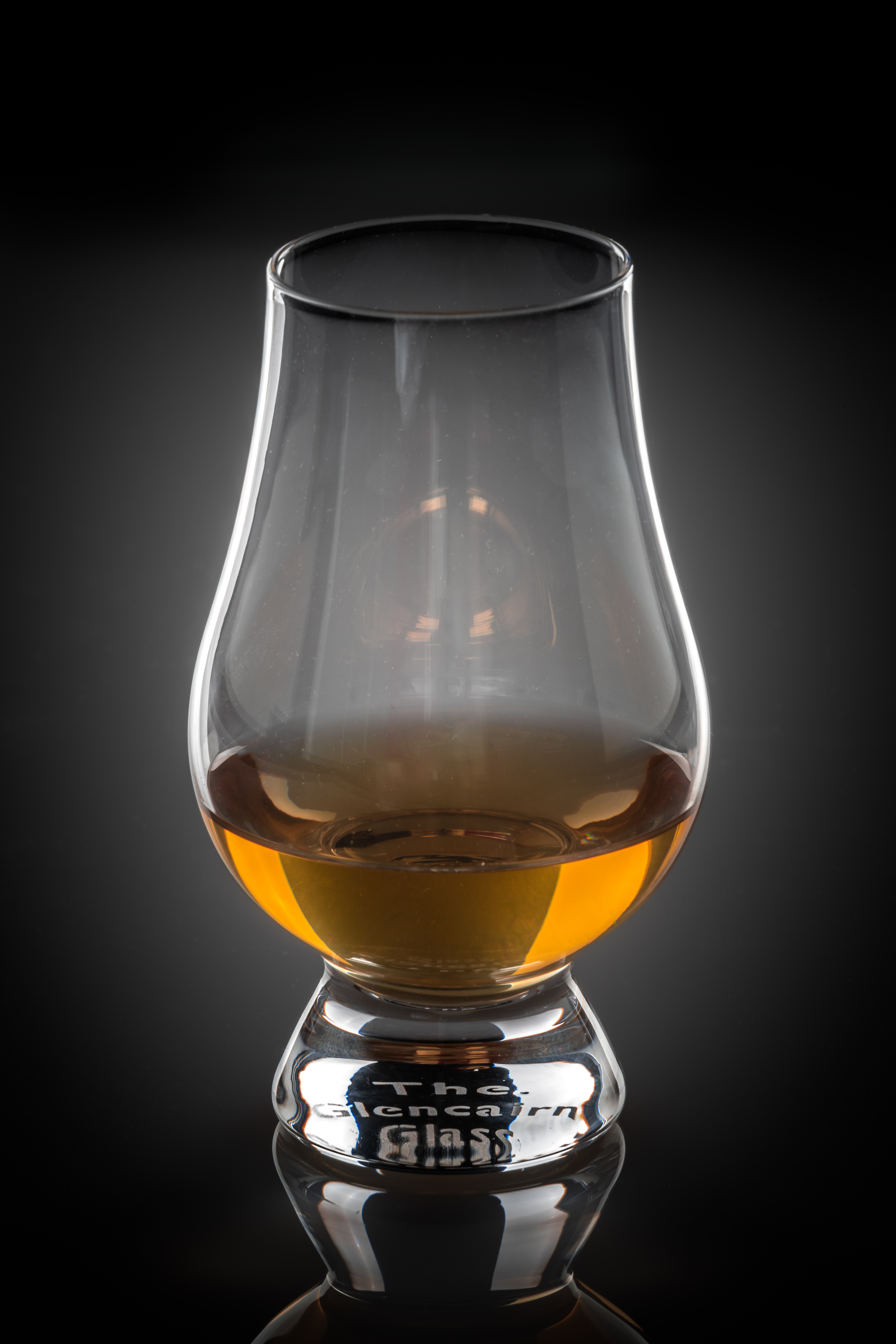
A Glencairn whisky glass

The Glencairn whisky glass is a style of glass intended for drinking whisky, developed and produced by Glencairn Crystal Ltd, in East Kilbride, a town near Glasgow, Scotland since 1981; originally designed by Raymond Davidson, managing director of the company. The shape of the glass is derived from the traditional nosing copitas used in whisky labs around Scotland. The glass design was selected with the aid of master blenders from five of the largest whisky companies in Scotland. The glass first came into production in 2001. Since then, additional mini-Glencairns and Canadian Glencairns were introduced.

The original Glencairn glass is approximately 115 mm (4 1/2 in) in height and has been available in three variations: 24% lead crystal, lead-free crystal, and soda-lime glass. The vast majority of glasses in circulation are of the lead-free crystal variety. The soda-lime variation was discontinued in 2008.

The capacity of a typical Glencairn whisky glass is approximately 175 ml (6 US fl oz), and it is intended to hold approximately 50 ml (1.7 US fl oz) of liquid.

In 2006, the glass won the Queen's Award for innovation.

The Glencairn glass is not the only glass on the market that is designed specifically for drinking whisky. (For example, Riedel and Norlan Glass also manufacture such glassware.) While there are numerous styles of such glasses available, the Glencairn is the first style to be endorsed by the Scotch Whisky Association, and to be used by every whisky company in Scotland and Ireland.
