= The Queen's Award for Enterprise: International Trade (Export) (1977) =

The Queen's Award for Enterprise: International Trade (Export) (1977) was awarded by Queen Elizabeth II.

== Recipients ==
The following organisations were awarded this year.

- William Hare Group Ltd
