= The Queen's Award for Enterprise: International Trade (Export) (2010) =

'The Queen's Award for Enterprise: International Trade (Export) (2010)' was awarded on 21 April.

== Recipients ==
The ninety-eight following organisations were awarded in 2010

- AMI Exchangers Limited of Hartlepool for charge air coolers and heat exchangers.
- Abbot Group Limited of Aberdeen for onshore and offshore drilling engineering and rig design.
- Aerospace Design & Engineering Consultants Limited of Stevenage, Hertfordshire for design and engineering services to commercial airlines and aircraft leasing companies
- Alcatel-Lucent Submarine Networks Limited of London SE10 for telecommunications systems.
- Allam Marine Ltd of Melton, Hull for industrial and marine generating sets.
- Alperton International Limited of Spennymoor, for engineering goods and services.
- Applied Acoustic Engineering Ltd of Great Yarmouth, Norfolk for underwater acoustic positioning, tracking and survey equipment.
- Applied Language Solutions Ltd of Oldham, Lancashire for international language services including translation and interpreting.
- Ashley Chase Estate Dorchester of Dorset for speciality hand-made English cheeses
- Autonomy Corporation of Cambridge for platform technology with a pure software model offering a full spectrum of mission-critical enterprise applications.
- Baillie Gifford Overseas Limited of Edinburgh for investment management services.
- Balmoral Comtec Ltd of Loirston, Aberdeen for surface and sub-surface buoyancy and elastomer products for the offshore energy sector.
- Baring Asset Management Limited of London EC2 for fund management services.
- The Binding Site Group Ltd of Kings Heath, Birmingham for immunodiagnostic kits.
- Bio Products Laboratory (BPL) of Elstree, Hertfordshire for therapeutic proteins
- The Book Depository Limited of Gloucester, an online book retailer.
- Brompton Bicycle Ltd of Brentford, Middlesex for folding bicycles.
- Bupa International of Brighton, East Sussex for private medical insurance.
- CarnaudMetalbox Engineering Limited of Shipley, West Yorkshire for can making machinery.
- Centrax Ltd of Newton Abbot, Devon for gas turbine generator sets.
- Chelton Limited of Marlow, Buckinghamshire for aircraft and ground antennas and related equipment for military and commercial use.
- Alfred Cheyne Engineering Limited of Banff, Aberdeenshire, for winches.
- ContiTech Beattie Ltd of Ashington, Northumberland for flexible hoses, couplings and fluid transfer systems to the oil & gas industry.
- Controlled Therapeutics (Scotland) Ltd of East Kilbride, Lanarkshire for unique polymer delivery system for the precise administration of drugs
- Crittall Windows Ltd of Witham, Essex for steel windows and doors.
- Dart Sensors Ltd of Exeter, Devon for electrochemical sensors for breath alcohol and toxic gases.
- Douglas Equipment Limited of Cheltenham, Gloucestershire for aviation towing tractors & helicopter/aircraft flight deck handlers
- Dynex Semiconductor Ltd of Lincoln for high power semiconductor devices and assemblies.
- TG Eakin Limited of Comber, County Down, Northern Ireland for disposable medical devices used for the treatment of stoma and wound care patients.
- Euravia Engineering & Supply Co Ltd Kelbrook, Lancashire for aero-engine design, overhaul, test and certification services.
- FA Premier League of London W1 for sale of TV rights to foreign broadcasters.
- First Magazine Limited of London SW1 a publisher of periodicals, special reports and text books.
- Future Health Technologies Ltd of Nottingham for its stem cell bank.
- Gilbert Gilkes & Gordon Ltd of Kendal, Cumbria for hydro electric turbines and engine cooling pumps.
- Hallin Marine UK Ltd of Dyce, Aberdeen, for subsea services to the oil and gas industry.
- Imagination Technologies Ltd of Kings Langley, for graphics, video, audio and communication software.
- Industrial Penstocks Ltd of Netherton, Dudley, for fluid control devices.
- The Innis & Gunn Brewing Company Ltd of Edinburgh for range of oak-aged specialty beers.
- Investment Property Databank of London EC1 for provision of portfolio analysis services and financial indices to the investment property industry.
- JDR Cable Systems Ltd of Littleport, Cambridgeshire for subsea umbilicals and power cables for the offshore oil and gas and renewable energy industries.
- KHL Group LLP of Wadhurst, East Sussex publishers & magazine advertising
- Kestrel Liner Agencies Ltd of Basildon, Essex for shipping liner agency and global freight management.
- Kilfrost Limited of Newcastle upon Tyne for de/Anti-icing fluids for the global aviation industry.
- Latens Systems Ltd of Belfast, Northern Ireland for pay for television software development.
- London College of Accountancy of London SE1 for accountancy, business and management education.
- McCalls Special Products Limited of Rotherham, for threaded bar and cable systems.
- McKinney Rogers International Limited of London SW1 for business execution services.
- Metal and Waste Recycling Limited of London N18 Recycling of scrap metal and waste.
- Micro Nav Limited of Bournemouth, Dorset for software and related services for airport and air traffic control simulation.
- Midsteel Flanges and Fittings Limited of Kingswinford, West Midlands for flanges, butt weld, forged fittings and ancillary piping products.
- Moog Components Group Limited of Reading, Berkshire for electrical slip rings and motion control components.
- Moog Insensys Ltd (Wind Energy Division) of Southampton, Hampshire for, measurement and analysis systems for the wind energy market.
- Naim Audio Ltd of Salisbury, Wiltshire for hi-fi audio and audio-video systems.
- Offshore Design Engineering Limited of Kingston upon Thames, for engineering consultancy project management.
- Oil Consultants Ltd of Washington, Tyne and Wear for engineering consulting services to the upstream oil industry.
- Isabella Oliver Limited of London NW5 for designer and online retailer of women's wear and maternity clothes.
- Pace plc of Saltaire, West Yorkshire for set-top boxes & digital home entertainment equipment.
- Parker Hannifin Ltd (Domnick Hunter Industrial) of Gateshead, Tyne and Wear for compressed air filtration & gas separation.
- Pearson PLC of London WC2 for provision of educational material and technology, consumer books and business information.
- Pelam Foods Limited of Chesham, Buckinghamshire for food and drink exports.
- Penlon Limited of Abingdon, Oxfordshire for medical devices.
- Penn Pharmaceutical Services Limited of Tredegar for pharmaceuticals.
- The Penspen Group Limited of Richmond, Surrey for engineering, project management, operations, maintenance and integrity services.
- Pipeline Engineering & Supply Co. Ltd of Richmond, North Yorkshire for pipeline pigging and flow assurance products and services to the oil and gas pipeline industry
- Power Jacks Limited of Fraserburgh, Aberdeenshire for industrial lifting and positioning equipment.
- Powercorp International Limited of London W1 for film and television programmes production.
- Prism Ideas of Nantwich, Cheshire for drug development consultancy services and medical communications
- Proto Labs Ltd of Telford, Shropshire Prototype injection moulded and CNC machined parts.
- RMD Kwikform of Aldridge, West Midlands for hire, sale and engineering design to the construction industry.
- Racal Acoustics Limited of Harrow, Middlesex for military communications ancillaries including military headsets.
- Sandvik Osprey Limited of Neath, Port Talbot for gas atomised metal powders and controlled expansion alloy products.
- Schrader Electronics Ltd of Antrim, County Antrim, Northern Ireland for electronic sensors and for ASIC's for automotive and industrial markets.
- SCIPAC Ltd of Sittingbourne, Kent for reagents for medical diagnostic tests.
- Select Biosciences of Sudbury, Suffolk. Scientific conferences, training courses and consultancy
- SELEX Galileo, Radar and Advanced Targeting unit (UK) of Edinburgh for airborne radar and targeting design, manufacture, supply and support.
- Sentec of Cambridge for smart metering and energy management solutions.
- Sparrows Offshore Group Ltd of Aberdeen for lifting, handling and fluid power technology and services for the offshore energy industry.
- Stannah Stairlifts Limited of Andover, Hampshire for design and manufacture of stair-lifts.
- Strategy & Technology Limited of London EC1 for specialist software for digital interactive television.
- Sunmark Ltd of Greenford, Middlesex for branded and own label food and drink products.
- Syngenta Bioline Production Ltd of Little Clacton, Essex for beneficial insects and mites for pest control in crops.
- Tamper Technologies Ltd of Ashbourne, Derbyshire for security and tamper evident labels and tapes to protect products and packaging.
- Themis Ltd of Trowbridge, Wiltshire for marketing information services to the global pharmaceutical industry.
- United Shield International Limited of Andover, Hampshire for personal ballistic protection.
- Vectric Ltd of Feckenham, Redditch, Worcestershire for software development and solutions for computerized craft industry machines.
- Vero Software Plc of Cheltenham, for CADCAM software for the mould and die industry.
- Walkers Shortbread Limited of Aberlour on Spey for shortbread, oatcakes and other Scottish specialities.
- Ward Shoes Ltd of Chapeltown, Sheffield for returned footwear and clothing.
- Watkiss Automation Limited of Sandy, Bedfordshire for book binding machinery.
- Williams Performance Tenders Ltd of Berinsfield, Oxfordshire for jet-powered ridged inflatable tenders for the marine leisure market.
- Scott Wilson Group plc of London SW1 for design and engineering consultancy services.
- Winn & Coales International Ltd of London SE27 for anti-corrosion and sealing products.
- Wireless Innovation Ltd of Churcham, for satellite and wireless technology services.
- Xennia Technology Limited of Letchworth, for ink-jet products and services.
- Yellow Octopus Limited of Skipton, North Yorkshire for clothing and footwear.
