= Wellman Group =

Group of manufacturing companies

Wellman International Ltd
- Company type: Conglomerate
- Industry: Mechanical engineering
- Predecessor: Wellman Smith Owen Engineering Corporation
- Founded: 1919
- Headquarters: Newfield Road, Oldbury, B69 3ET
- Area served: Global
- Products: Boilers, furnaces, heat exchangers
- Services: Boiler repair
- Revenue: £42 million (2009/10)
- Number of employees: c.500
- Subsidiaries: Wellman Hunt-Graham; Wellman Thermal Services; Wellman Defence
- Website: Wellman Group

The Wellman Group is a group of manufacturing companies that make boilers and advanced defence equipment. It is one of the main boilermakers in the UK, if not the most common for large-scale industrial applications, having taken over many well-known boiler companies.

== History ==
The main company began as the Wellman Smith Owen Engineering Corporation, a large conglomerate British engineering company. It derived from an English company of Samuel T. Wellman, a steel industry pioneer. It was based at Parnell House on Wilton Road in London, next to London Victoria station. It supplied furnaces to the British steel industry.

The site at Oldbury has been making boilers since 1862.

In August 1965 it split in several subsidiaries, including Wellman Machines (at Darlaston), Wellman Incandescent Furnace Company (at Darlaston, Staffordshire), Wellman Steelworks Engineering, and Wellman Incandescent International.

Wellman became a private company in December 1997, when bought by Alchemy Partners for £82 million, by setting up a nominal transitional consortium company called Newmall (an anagram of Wellman). In 2003 it formed a commercial alliance with Loos International, a German boiler maker. In August 2005, Alchemy split the company into two – Newmall, for the US subsidiaries and Really Newmall for the other subsidiaries; this became Wellman Group Ltd, owned by Kwikpower International, in the Kwikpower Wellman division. In May 2009 the company formed an alliance with Wulff Energy Technologies GmbH of Husum to form Wellman Wulff.

=== Robey of Lincoln ===
Robey of Lincoln was an agricultural firm that went into making boilers in 1870. It was bought by Babcock International in July 1985 when Robey had a turnover of £7 million.

== Structure ==
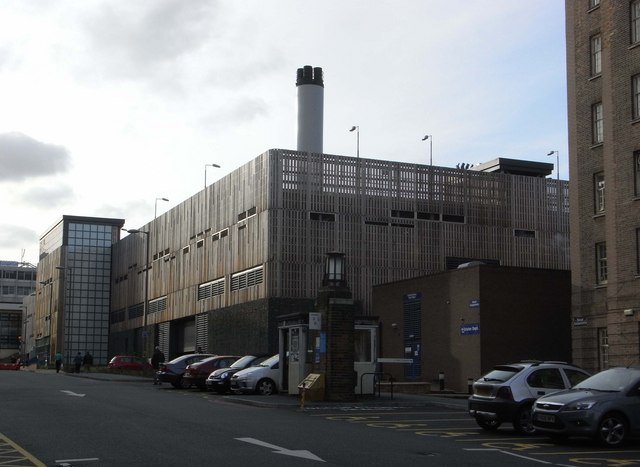
University Hospital Birmingham boilerhouse with three Wellman-Robey boilers

It is headquartered on the A457 on the western side of Oldbury, next to the Birmingham Canal. It has three subsidiaries.

=== Wellman Hunt-Graham ===
Wellman Graham merged with Hunt Thermal Engineering Ltd to form Wellman Hunt-Graham in 2012. It works in the heat transfer industry. It is the UK's largest manufacturer of shell and tube heat exchangers.

Wellman Graham began in 1956 as Heat Transfer Ltd. The company changed name to Graham Manufacturing Ltd in 1977, It was sold to Wellman Group in 1995 and Changed name to Wellman Graham Ltd, and was based in Gloucester before moving its design and manufacturing facility to Oldbury in the West Midlands.

Wellman Hunt Graham was acquired by Corac Group plc in 2012 and renamed to Hunt Graham Ltd, and in 2013 changed its name to Hunt Thermal Technologies. Corac Group plc was renamed as TP Group plc in 2015 and Hunt Thermal Technologies has since been renamed as TPG Engineering.

=== Wellman Thermal Services ===
This makes industrial furnaces. A division of the company, Wellman Process Engineering, makes evaporators and crystallisers. The company makes boilers for combined heat and power schemes. Wellman-Robey boilers are made at Oldbury.

=== Wellman Defence ===
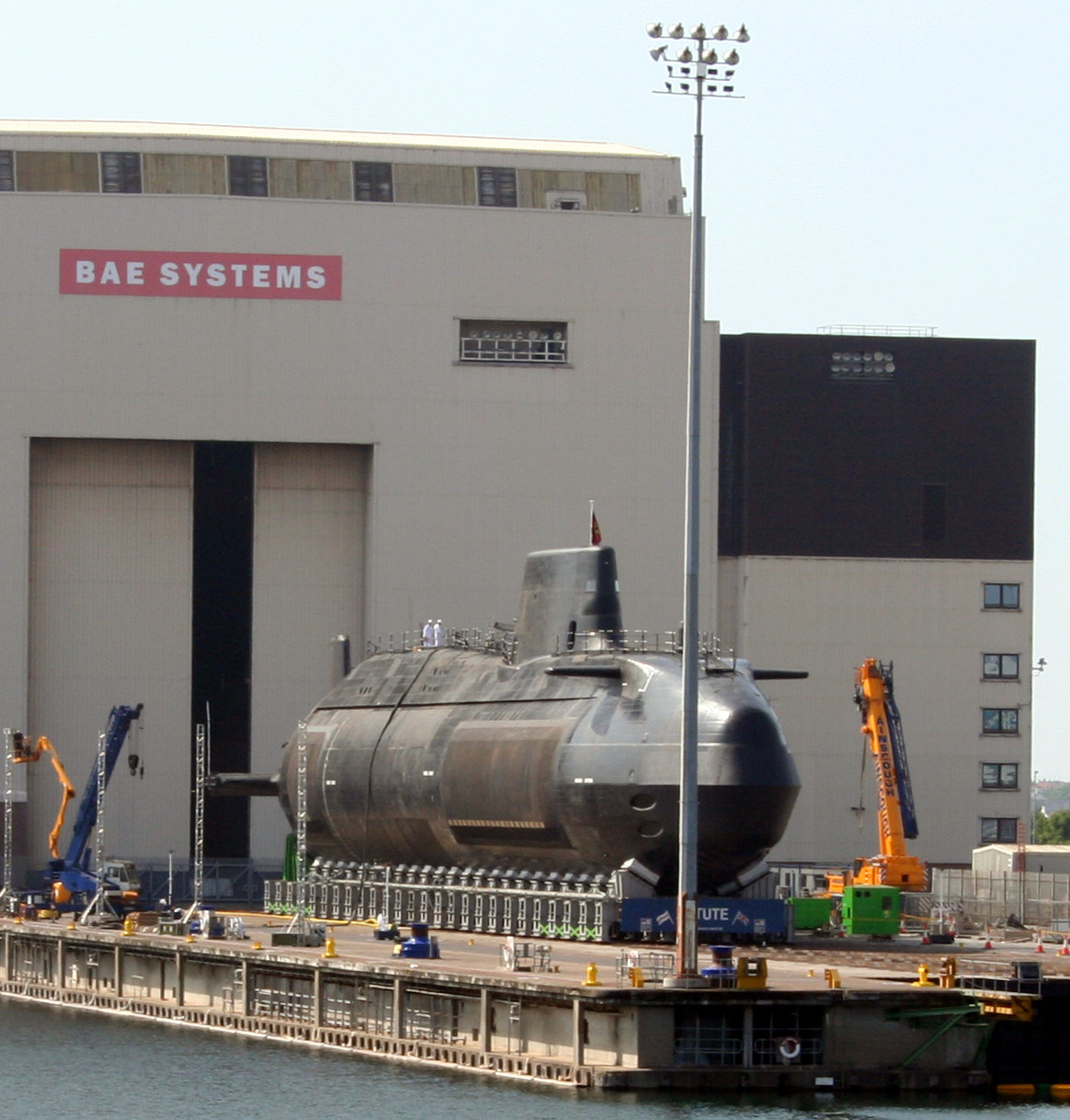
It makes the air purifiers for the Astute class

This started as the research division of John Brown Engineers and Constructors Ltd in 1957. It became part of Wellman Group in 1996. Its main significance is that it developed the equipment for purified air that allows the Royal Navy's nuclear submarines to be submerged for months at a time – Submarine Atmosphere Control. This uses an electrolyser. Carbon dioxide from the submarine reacts with hydrogen from the electrolyser and is removed.

It also supplies oxygen generation equipment to other countries such as France for the new Barracuda-class submarine.

Wellman Defence was acquired by Corac Group plc in 2012 and renamed to Atmosphere Control International. Corac Group plc was renamed as TP Group plc in 2015 and Atmosphere Control International has since been renamed as TPG Maritime

== Products ==
- Boilers – 100 kW to 35MW
- Steam boilers
- Water heat recovery boilers
- Furnaces – now part of the Almor Group (www.wellman-furnaces.com]
- Combined heat and power schemes
- Heat exchangers
- Air purifiers for nuclear submarines

== Installations ==
- North British Distillery, Edinburgh

== See also ==
- Wellman-Seaver-Morgan Engineering Company
