= The Queen's Award for Enterprise: International Trade (Export) (2005) =

The Queen's Award for Enterprise: International Trade (Export) (2005) was awarded on 21 April 2005, by Queen Elizabeth II.

== Recipients ==
The following organisations were awarded this year.

- Abbot Group of Altens, Aberdeen, Scotland for onshore and offshore drilling, engineering and rig design.
- Abcam of Cambridge for Antibodies and related reagents.
- Advanced Crusher Spares of Minworth, Sutton Coldfield, West Midlands for spare parts for crushing and recycling machines.
- Allen Group of Bodelwyddan, Denbighshire, Wales for pneumatic and hydraulic tubing, electrical cable and formed tube assemblies for use on commercial vehicles.
- Alvan Blanch Development Company of Malmesbury, Wiltshire for crop processing equipment.
- Arcotronics of Towcester, Northamptonshire for electronic components.
- Aromco of Nuthampstead, Royston, Hertfordshire for food flavourings.
- Atkin Chambers of London for legal services.
- BUPA International of Brighton, Sussex forpPrivate medical insurance.
- BananaStock of Watlington, Oxfordshire for royalty free CD-ROM and down-loadable stock photography images.
- Bartec Auto ID of Barnsley, South Yorkshire for tyre pressure monitoring equipment.
- Edmund Bell & Company of Bradford for domestic and contract home furnishing textiles.
- The Bruichladdich Distillery Co of Argyll, Scotland for islay single malt scotch whisky.
- Canongate Books of Edinburgh, Scotland for book publishing.
- Cellhire of York for rental of telecommunications products.
- Checker Leather of Kilmaurs, Kilmarnock, Scotland for leather goods.
- FJ Church & Sons of Rainham, Essex for non-ferrous scrap metal.
- Colin Stewart Minchem of Winsford, Cheshire for industrial minerals, inorganic chemicals and additives.
- Cunningham Lindsey International of London for insurance consultancy services.
- Dansco Dairy Products of Newcastle Emlyn, Carmarthenshire, Wales for mozzarella cheese and other dairy products.
- Datapath of Derby for Computer graphic boards and accessories.
- James Dawson & Son of Lincoln for silicone and organic specialist automotive hoses.
- Delcam of Birmingham for CADCAM software.
- Delta Biotechnology of Nottingham for recombinant human albumin production from proprietary high yield yeast expression system.
- Diomed of Waterbeach, Cambridge for Laser equipment for medical use and related products.
- Dunn Brothers of Smethwick, West Midlands for scrap metal recycling.
- Extec Screens & Crushers of Swadlincote, Derbyshire for screening and crushing equipment.
- Fine Fragrances & Cosmetics of Sunbury-on-Thames, Middlesex for toiletries and cosmetics.
- FlavorActiV of Chinnor, Oxfordshire for development and provision of professional taster products.
- Fonebak of West Thurrock, Grays, Essex for Mobile phone reuse and recycling.
- GD Metal Recycling of London for recycling of scrap metal and waste.
- GR Micro of London for medical microbiology and molecular biology services.
- Gate 7 of Gateshead for Decals and labels.
- Genesys International of Burnham, Slough for chemicals and services to the international water industry used for water purification.
- GigaSat of Kensworth, Dunstable, Bedfordshire for satellite communication equipment.
- GreenMech of Alcester, Warwickshire for wood chippers and green waste shredders.
- Heber of Stroud, Gloucestershire for electronic control systems for amusement, gaming, vending and high reliability embedded applications.
- Helen of Troy (UK) of Sheffield for manufacturing and distribution of small electrical personal care appliances.
- K Home International of Thornaby, Stockton-on-Tees for project management and engineering design services.
- ICAP of London for finance broking.
- Image Source of London for royalty free digital photography.
- Inca Digital Printers of Cambridge for industrial digital flatbed inkjet printers.
- Indamex of Peterborough for diesel engine driven generating sets.
- Intex Management Services Ltd t/a IMS Research of Wellingborough, Northamptonshire for market research in the electronics industry.
- Investment Property Databank of London for property investment indices and performance analysis.
- Isle of Arran Distillers of Stirling, Scotland for malt and blended scotch whisky and cream liqueur.
- JCB Backhoe Loader Business Unit of Rocester, Uttoxeter, Staffordshire for backhoe loaders.
- Andrew Kain Enterprises of Hereford for risk mitigation.
- Kemistry of London for broadcast design.
- LibraPharm of Thatcham, Berkshire for medical journals and reprints.
- Martek Marine of Rotherham, South Yorkshire for safety monitoring systems for marine vessels.
- Martin Currie of Edinburgh, Scotland for investment management.
- Microsulis of Denmead, Waterlooville, Hampshire for Microwave Endometrial Ablation (MEA) system.
- Millbrook Instruments of Blackburn for instruments for the surface analysis of advanced materials.
- Molecular Products of Dunmow, Essex for chemical filtration products for air purification.
- NavisWorks of Sheffield for computer software.
- Newson Gale of Nottingham for electrostatic grounding systems for hazardous areas.
- Nitecrest of Leyland, Preston, Lancashire for telephone, credit and loyalty cards.
- Noahs Ark Chemicals of Cambridge for bulk and speciality chemicals.
- Northbrook Technology of Northern Ireland of Belfast, Northern Ireland for information technology and business process outsourcing.
- Oceanair Marine of Selsey, Chichester, West Sussex for blinds and flyscreens for windows and hatches on boats and vehicles.
- Outokumpu Stainless, ASR Rod Mill of Sheffield for stainless steel rod in coil.
- BL-Pegson of Coalville, Leicestershire for rock crushing plant and machinery.
- Pelam Foods of Amersham, Buckinghamshire for food and drink merchant.
- Performance Plus of Trafford Park, Manchester for Consultancy and reliability services for rotating equipment.
- Perkins Shibaura Engines of Peterborough for compact sub 75 hp diesel engines.
- Pipeshield International of Lowestoft, Suffolk for Specialised protection and support systems for marine/oVshore structures and pipelines.
- Powershield Doors of Lisburn, County Antrim, Northern Ireland for steel doors and steel framed glazing systems.
- Rock Fall Company of Dundonald, Kilmarnock, Scotland for underwater drilling and blasting engineering.
- Rotary (International) of Newtownabbey, County Antrim, Northern Ireland for building services engineers.
- Sat-Comm of Mildenhall, Bury St Edmunds, Suffolk for satellite uplink systems.
- Scientific Games International of Leeds for security printing.
- Shipham Valves of Hull, East Yorkshire for non-ferrous and high alloy valves.
- Silver Fox of Welwyn Garden City, Hertfordshire for labelling solutions for both the energy and telecommunications industries.
- Singletons Dairy of Preston, Lancashire for quality cheeses.
- Smith & Ouzman Limited of Eastbourne, Sussex for security printed documents.
- Sortex of London for Optical sorters used to detect and remove diseased and foreign material from crops.
- SPS International of Westhill, Aberdeenshire, Scotland for wellbore completion services.
- Tilhill Forestry of Stirling, Scotland for forest management, timber harvesting and wood fibre supply.
- Toyota Manufacturing UK of Burnaston, Derby for passenger vehicles, parts and engines.
- Tracerco of Billingham, Cleveland for process diagnostic services, specialist measurement devices and fuel marking technologies.
- Trackwise Designs t/a Trackwise of Tewkesbury, Gloucestershire for high frequency printed circuit boards.
- Trinity International Services of Aberdeen, Scotland for offshore and remote-site catering and hotel-keeping services.
- University of Essex of Colchester, Essex for higher education.
- University of Westminster of London for higher education.
- Varn Products Company of Irlam, Manchester for chemicals and solvents for the graphic arts industry.
- Viridian Energy Supply of Belfast, Northern Ireland for retail electricity and gas supply.
- Yes Group of Hull, East Yorkshire for bespoke marine electronic equipment.
