= The Queen's Award for Enterprise: Innovation (Technology) (2009) =

The Queen's Award for Enterprise: Innovation (Technology) (2009) was awarded on 21 April 2009, by Queen Elizabeth II.

== Recipients ==
The following business units were awarded this year.

- Aerelink Limited of Merseyside for design and delivery of bespoke wireless solutions and provision of high calibre engineering services.
- AESSEAL (MCK) Ltd of Lisburn, County Antrim for flow fuse - utilised with mechanical seals used, on pump equipment.
- Alcomet Limited of Kingswinford, for guardian security products.
- Alford Technologies Limited of Chippenham, Wiltshire for user-filled high explosive charges which project high velocity water for the neutralization of improvised bombs.
- Alumet Systems (UK) Ltd of Southam, Warwickshire for ABLE Façade for system building protection from bomb blasts
- Apical Limited of London for W1 'iridix' digital core which models how the human eye adapts to changing viewing conditions.
- Astech Projects Limited of Runcorn, Cheshire for automated pharmaceutical testing of metered dose and dry powder inhalers.
- Autonomy Corporation of Cambridge for Intelligent Data Operating Layer (IDOL).
- Beamer Limited of Salisbury, Wiltshire for design and development of a high mobility all-terrain disability buggy.
- Blizzard Protection Systems Limited of Bangor, Gwynedd, Wales for REFLEXCELL - lightweight thermal protection for casualties.
- BullionVault London W6 Gold bullion dealing and storage for private investors.
- CGC Technology Ltd of Farnham, Surrey for design, manufacture, installation and commissioning of satellite tracking systems.
- Cartesian Limited of WC2, London for 'Ascertain' software for telecommunications operators.
- Centek Limited of Newton Abbot, Devon for bow spring, non-welded casing centralisers for the oil industry.
- Oliver Crispin Robotics Ltd (t/a OC Robotics) of Filton, Bristol for development of snake-arm robots for confined space applications
- Crux Products Limited of Godstone, for grout seal.
- Disposable Cubicle Curtains Ltd of Horsham for 'Easy-fit' patented disposable cubicle curtains
- EnviroVent Limited of Harrogate, for EnviroVent 'filterless' energy-saving extractor fan.
- Excalibur Screwbolts Ltd of Hockley, Essex for the one piece Excalibur Screwbolt high performance fixing anchor for all substrates.
- Flare Solutions Limited of Marlow, Buckinghamshire for E & P catalog web based software product and consulting.
- Forge Europa Limited of Ulverston, Cumbria Custom design of for lED displays, assemblies and lighting solutions.
- Golf-Tech Limited of Swindon, Wiltshire for "Power Tee" automatic golf tee for driving ranges.
- GreenMech Ltd of Alcester, for tracked tool carrier designed to access difficult terrain.
- Greenstar WES Limited of Redcar, Cleveland for innovation in recycling food-grade and other plastics.
- IHC Engineering Business Ltd of Riding Mill, Northumberland for design and manufacture of systems for offshore oil and gas, telecom, renewables and defence.
- Johnson Matthey Emission Control of Royston, for compact soot filters for diesel cars.
- Kingspan Tarec Industrial Insulation Limited of Glossop, Derbyshire for continuous production process for the manufacture of phenolic pipe insulation.
- Knorr-Bremse Rail Systems (UK) Limited of Melksham, Wiltshire for eP2002 modular, mechatronic rail brake control valve.
- McLaren Electronic Systems Ltd of Woking, Surrey for the Standard Electronic Control Unit for FIA Formula for one racing cars.
- Pace Plc of Saltaire, for high definition set-top box technology.
- PhysE Limited of Yarmouth, Isle of Wight for derivation of meteorological and oceanographic design criteria for offshore installations.
- Plextek Ltd of Great Chesterford, for electronic product design, supply and consultancy.
- Possum Limited of Aylesbury, for disability home control unit with touch screen.
- Powertraveller Ltd of Alton, Hampshire for portable power solutions for electronic devices.
- RF Engines Ltd of Newport, Isle of Wight for electronic product and systems design using complex digital signal processing techniques.
- Renishaw plc of Wotton-under-Edge, Gloucestershire for oMP400 ultra-compact strain gauge spindle probe with RenGage 3D technology
- ScriptSwitch Limited of Coventry for prescribing decision support for the medical profession, increasing clinical standards and reducing costs.
- Sirus Automotive Ltd of Wednesbury, West Midlands for product development and production methods of vehicles for wheelchair users.
- Smartstak of Sheffield for a load handling system which eliminates breakages when transporting glass bottles.
- Sondrel Ltd of Reading, Berkshire for implementation of complex integrated circuits.
- TRL Technology Limited of Tewkesbury, Gloucestershire for BROADSHIELD Counter for radio-controlled Improvised Explosive Device solutions for military, civilian and VVIP protection.
- Thermo Fisher Scientific (Cambridge UK) of Cambridge for the iCAP 6000 Series Inductively Coupled Plasma Optical Emission Spectrometer (ICP-OES).
- Tracerco of Billingham for a range of radiation and contamination monitors.
- Valor Fires of Erdington for Homeflame high efficiency inset gas fire range.
- Vascutek Limited of Inchinnan, Renfrewshire for bioValsalva - porcine aortic valved conduit.
- West Energy Saving Technologies Ltd of Bramcote, Nottingham VENTMISER CMSM (carbon management for switch module) automatic ventilation controllers.
- Wireless CCTV Ltd of Rochdale, Lancashire Wireless for CCTV dome cameras for mobile surveillance.
- Women Like Us of London N19 for supporting women with children to return to work and employers to source experienced part-time staff.
