= The Queen's Award for Enterprise: Innovation (Technology) (2011) =

The Queen's Award for Enterprise: Sustainable Development (Innovation Technology) (2011) was awarded on 21 April 2011, by Queen Elizabeth II.

The following organisations were awarded this year.

== Recipients ==
- AGD Systems Limited of Staverton, Cheltenham for AGD94X series pedestrian nearside signals.
- ARM Holdings plc of Cambridge for licensing of technology to partners globally for low energy chips for digital electronics.
- J C Bamford Excavators Limited of Rocester, Staffordshire for lock-up torque converter fitted to backhoe loader saving fuel, emissions and travel time.
- BBC Research & Development of London for the Piero sports graphics system – a tool for sports analysis on TV using 3D graphics and real-time image processing.
- Brandon Medical Company Limited of Leeds, West Yorkshire for HD-LED lighting with ultra high efficiency and near perfect colour rendition across the visible spectrum.
- Cambridge Consultants of Cambridge for Prism 200 – a handheld through-wall radar for counter-terrorist applications.
- Checkmate Lifting & Safety LLP of Sheerness, Kent for Xcalibre fall arrest blocks to protect from falls from height.
- Conwy Valley Systems Limited of Conwy for PETROG – petrographic data capture, management, analysis and reporting.
- Datapath Limited of Derby for innovative video graphics and capture technology for custom and professional applications.
- DotEcon Limited of London for Design and implementation of novel online auctions for radio spectrum and other uses globally.
- DuPont Teijin Films UK Limited of Middlesbrough for high performance Melinex® polyester films for solar photovoltaic modules.
- EA Technology Limited of Capenhurst, Cheshire for UltraTEV products assessing the condition of high and medium voltage assets in power generation, transmission and distribution.
- ECOSYL Products Limited of Stokesley, North Yorkshire for ECOSYL ULV and ECOSYL 100 ultra-low volume biological inoculants for treatment and enhancement of forage for cows and sheep.
- FFEI Limited of Hemel Hempstead, Hertfordshire for low cost composite resin internal drum platesetter for emerging markets.
- Harvard Engineering PLC of Normanton, Wakefield for LeafNut central monitoring and wireless control system for street lighting.
- i2 Ltd of Fulbourn, Cambridgeshire for the Intelligence-Led Operations Platform providing transformational technology for intelligence acquisition, management, analysis / visualization and communication.
- International Health Partners (UK) Limited of Wadhurst, East Sussex for innovation in new forms of donated medical aid.
- Jagex of Cambridge for RuneScape, a free-to-play online Massively Multiplayer Online (MMO) game
- Linemark (UK) Limited of Rawtenstall, Lancashire for the Impact Paint System used in the sports marking industry.
- Molecular Profiles Limited of Nottingham for nanoPASS – an innovation for the development of pharmaceutical products.
- The National Archives of Kew, Richmond for digital archiving technology and consulting software services.
- Payne Security (a division of Filtrona C & SP Limited) of Giltbrook, Nottingham for a covert, highly secure authentication and government excise protection system.
- Peak NDT Limited of Derby for design, development and exploitation of the Micropulse 5 series of ultrasonic NDT controllers.
- Probrand of Hockley, Birmingham for innovation in buyside price comparison technology enabling best value and dynamic marketplaces.
- Radio Design Limited of Shipley, West Yorkshire for the Universal Combiner Unit, allowing multiple cellular operator companies to share a common antenna system.
- READ Well Services Limited of Aberdeen for Hydraulically Expandable Tubular Systems, offering flexible design solutions for drilling, completion and well integrity issues.
- RealVNC Limited of Cambridge for innovation in VNC remote access software that allows users to connect and control one computer from another.
- Red Bee Media Limited (Piero Division) of London for the Piero sports graphics system – a tool for sports analysis on TV using 3D graphics and real-time image processing.
- Renishaw plc of Wotton under Edge, Gloucestershire for the TRS2 broken tool detection system.
- Roke Manor Research Limited of Romsey, Hampshire for Resolve, a modular manpack electronic warfare system for the exploitation and suppression of hostile communication equipment.
- SecurEnvoy Limited of Reading, Berkshire for being the inventors and vendors of tokenless two-factor authentication.
- Selex Galileo, Radar & Advanced Targeting of Edinburgh for innovation in the design and production of military lasers providing imaging, range finding and designation capabilities.
- Sentec Limited of Cambridge for Sterling, an optimum platform for smart water meters, featuring solid state, durable and accurate metrology.
- Smiths Detection Watford Limited of Bushey, Hertfordshire for design and manufacturer of the Lightweight Chemical Detector Series.
- Soil Machine Dynamics Limited of Wallsend, Tyne and Wear for design and manufacture of work-class remotely operated vehicles (WROVs).
- Solarcentury Holdings Limited of London for C21e solar electric roof tiles and slates.
- Specialised Imaging Limited of Tring, Hertfordshire for ultra high speed imaging systems for research, industrial, military and scientific applications.
- Spectrum Brands (UK) Limited of Washington, Tyne and Wear for a mercury-free hearing aid battery and innovations to increase capacity, quality and production processes.
- Survival Craft Inspectorate Limited of Findon, Aberdeen for Safelaunch, a quick-release lifeboat launch system.
- Tessella plc of Abingdon, Oxfordshire for digital archiving technology and consulting software services.
- Trident Sensors Limited of Cranleigh, Surrey for innovation in the design of the Polaris GPS tracker and data communications system.
- Vernacare Limited of Bolton, Lancashire for the single use washbowl made from biodegradable pulp, used to prevent healthcare acquired infections.
- Volumatic Limited of Coventry for CounterCache Intelligent and the TruPouch – innovations in secure handling and management of cash by retailers.
- Zeeko Limited of Coalville, Leicestershire for the Optics Fabrication Centre, an innovative ultra-precision corrective polisher range with integrated metrology.
