= Spectrum Technologies =

Spectrum Technologies Ltd
- Company type: Ltd
- Industry: Wire Processing, Aerospace, Medical, Rail, Automotive, Telecoms and Data, Electronics
- Founded: 1989
- Headquarters: Bridgend, Wales, UK
- Key people: Dr. P. H. Dickinson, Chairman & Chief Technical Officer; Mr. Wayne Thomas, Managing Director; Mr. Mike McGrath, Finance Director; Jonathan Mowat, Director of Sales and Marketing; David Treharne, Director of Engineering
- Products: Laser Wire Markers, Laser Wire Strippers, Measure & Cut Systems, Wire Handling & Automation Systems, Inkjet Wire Markers
- Services: Installation, Training, Repair, Maintenance, Software Development, Product Development
- Number of employees: 75 (2026)
- Subsidiaries: Spectrum Technologies USA Inc. Spectrum Technologies Asia Pacific
- Website: spectrumtech.com

Spectrum Technologies Ltd is a British company, based in Bridgend, Wales, which designs and manufactures specialised industrial laser wire marking, laser wire stripping, and wire handling and automation systems.

== History ==
The company was established in 1989 as a wholly owned subsidiary of British Aerospace (now BAE Systems) as a spin-off from BAE's corporate research and development centre in Bristol to undertake the commercialisation of laser technology derived from BAE's R&D programmes which did not fit with the business of its main operating divisions.

== Products ==
The company's first product introduction was the CAPRIS line of laser wire marking and processing systems, based on the ultraviolet laser wire marking process originally developed at BAE's laboratories in 1987, which was extended into a family of products, developed principally for the international aerospace market, for use in the manufacture and maintenance of complex aircraft electrical wiring systems. The company is the primary supplier of this technology on a global basis and has almost every major international aerospace manufacturer on its customer list.

In the early 1990s, the company developed several other products, including a system used to manufacture the aluminium microwave grid array for the communications antennae for the Orion communications satellite and R&D systems for medical applications.

== Ownership ==
In March 1994, Spectrum Technologies was the subject of a management buy-out, which placed 80% of the company's equity with the management while BAE retained a 20% stake; BAE also took a royalty on Spectrum sales for a period of 10 years ending December 2004. In 1998, the company converted to Public Limited Company status, and in August 1998 its shares were introduced to the PLUS Markets in London.

== Awards ==
In 1995, the company was a recipient of the Queen's Award for Export, and in 2000 won three export awards, including the company's second Queen's Award for Enterprise for International Trade, and in 2006 won a third Queen's Award for Enterprise for International Trade.

== Overseas markets ==
In 1998, the company established Spectrum Interconnect Inc in the US, as a wholly owned subsidiary to provide sales and service of its CAPRIS laser wire marking products in the North American market. In 2001, the company acquired RtMc Inc of Phoenix, Arizona, a manufacturer of a range of complementary infrared laser wire stripping products, and Vektronics Inc of Vista, California, a competitor in the aerospace market. In 2003, these were merged into a single new operating company, Spectrum Technologies USA Inc., with offices in Phoenix and Dallas Fort Worth, Texas.

In 2007, Spectrum opened its Hong Kong based sales and service office to support the Asia Pacific market.

== New Marketing ==
Republic of South Africa, Egypt, Nigeria, EACU.
