= The Queen's Award for Enterprise: Innovation (Technology) (1979) =

The Queen's Award for Enterprise: Innovation (Technology) (1979) was awarded on 21 April 1979, by Queen Elizabeth II.

== Recipients ==
The following organisations were awarded this year.

- Fawley Refinery for new solvent in lube oil refining.
- Decca Radar for "Clearscan" marine radar clarification device.
- GEC Computers of Borehamwood, Hertfordshire for the design of the GEC 4000 series minicomputers.
