= The Queen's Award for Enterprise: International Trade (Export) (2008) =

The Queen's Award for Enterprise: International Trade (Export) (2008) was awarded on 21 April 2008, by Queen Elizabeth II.

== Recipients ==
The following organisations were awarded this year.

- 2 entertain Limited of London W1 for DVD/Video and music publishing.
- Advanced New Technologies Limited of Hull for electronic systems for the super yacht industry.
- Alwayse Engineering Limited of Birmingham, West Midlands for ball transfer units.
- Aquaspersions Limited of Halifax, West Yorkshire for speciality chemical dispersion and emulsion products for the water based polymer industry.
- Audio Processing Technology Ltd of Belfast, Northern Ireland for broadcast audio equipment.
- Authentix Limited of York for brand protection and product authentication.
- BACTEC International Limited of Rochester, Kent for explosive ordnance disposal and landmine clearance.
- J & A Beare Ltd of London W1 for restorers of antique stringed musical instruments and bows.
- Benoy Limited of Newark, Nottinghamshire for architecture, masterplanning, interior and graphic design.
- The British Showcase Group Ltd (trading as Click Netherfield) of Livingston, West Lothian, for specialist museum display cases.
- CVI Technical Optics Limited of Onchan, Isle of Man for laser optical components.
- Canyon Europe Ltd of Newtownabbey, County Antrim for trigger sprayers and pump dispensers.
- Cape PLC, International Division of Uxbridge, Middlesex for thermal insulation and other industrial services.
- Centek Ltd of Newton Abbot, Devon for casing centralisers and stop collars for the oil and gas industry.
- I & G Cohen Limited of Salford, Greater Manchester for second hand clothing, footwear and household textiles.
- Cummins Ltd, Darlington Engine Plant of Darlington, County Durham for diesel engines and components
- Delfield Precision Engineering Co. Ltd of Ruislip, Middlesex for casings for radiation shielding.
- Downhole Products Plc of Portlethen, Aberdeen, for oil well products.
- Scotland DUCO Ltd of Newcastle upon Tyne for subsea umbilical systems.
- Euromoney Institutional Investor PLC of London EC4 for financial and business publishing, conference organisers and electronic information and data provider.
- Europlus Direct Ltd of Saltaire, West Yorkshire for information technology services.
- Evolution Securities China Limited of London EC3 for investment banking and securities.
- Excelsior Technologies of Flint, Wales for specialist food packaging
- Fairline Boats Ltd of Oundle, Northamptonshire for luxury powerboats.
- Fast React Systems Ltd of Derby for software design and sales.
- Fintec Crushing & Screening Ltd of Dungannon, County Tyrone for mobile crushing and screening equipment.
- Fort Vale Engineering Ltd of Burnley, Lancashire for valves, manways and accessories for the transport and storage of bulk liquids, gases and powders.
- Fortress Interlocks Limited of Wolverhampton, for safety interlock systems.
- Garrad Hassan Group Limited of Bristol for renewable energy consultancy.
- Gripple Ltd of Sheffield, South Yorkshire for wire joining and tensioning devices for use in agricultural and construction industries.
- Group 4 Technology Ltd of Tewkesbury, Gloucestershire for access control and security products.
- Haztec International Limited of Leeds, West Yorkshire for vehicle warning equipment for the emergency and municipal services.
- Humax Electronics Co. Ltd of London TW8 Digital set top boxes and for LCD televisions.
- Huthwaite International of Rotherham, South Yorkshire for sales and management training consultancy.
- Hyder Consulting PLC of London SW1 for advisory and design services in property and infrastructure.
- Independent Forgings & Alloys Ltd of Sheffield, South Yorkshire for specialist open die forgings, rolled rings, precision forged bars in nickel alloys, titanium and steels.
- Inflight Peripherals Limited of Newport, Isle of Wight for electronic equipment for in-flight entertainment systems.
- The International Student Centre of Ealing, London W14 for vocational education, professional and post graduate.
- Hammersmith and West London College for training programmes.
- Ivory & Ledoux Limited of London NW3 for raw materials, juice concentrate, pulps and purees.
- JCB Backhoe Loader Business Unit of Rocester, Staffordshire for backhoe loader excavators.
- JCB Service of Uttoxeter, Staffordshire for parts and accessories for earth moving machines.
- Keltie of London EC4 - patent and trade mark attorneys
- LC & M Ltd of Lincoln for crankshafts for the oil and gas industry.
- Land Rover Holdings of Gaydon, Warwickshire for 4 x 4 Vehicles, parts, accessories and lifestyle products
- Llanllyr Water Company Limited of Lampeter, Ceredigion, Wales for bottled spring water.
- Loch Duart Ltd of Scourie, Sutherland Fresh farmed for Scottish salmon.
- Scotland MSI Recruitment Ltd of London SE1 for recruitment agency.
- J. Marr (Seafoods) Ltd of Hull for frozen pelagic fish.
- Motorola Point to Point Fixed Wireless Solutions Group of Ashburton, Devon for broadband solutions bridging and extending high-speed voice and data networks, for secure and reliable connectivity.
- Owen Mumford Limited of Woodstock, Oxfordshire for medical disposables.
- Oceanair Marine Limited of Selsey, West Sussex for window coverings, hatch blinds and screens for boats, vehicles and homes.
- Online Electronics Limited of Aberdeen, Scotland for pipeline pig monitoring equipment, and pipeline data communications systems.
- Pace Micro Technology plc of Saltaire, West Yorkshire Digital for tV technology developers.
- Pentland Group Plc of London W1 for clothing and footwear.
- Pharmaterials Ltd of Reading, Berkshire for pharmaceutical materials testing, polymorphism, salt selection, inhaled and solid oral dose formulation.
- Picsel Technologies Limited of Glasgow, Scotland for mobile software development.
- PolicyPlus International plc of Bath for traded endowment policies.
- Powerlase Limited of Crawley, West Sussex for industrial lasers.
- Quest Personal Care Global Limited of Manchester for disposable personal care products.
- RBS WorldPay of London EC2 a multi currency card and payment processor.
- Rapiscan Systems Limited of Redhill, Surrey for security x-ray and metal detection screening products.
- John Reid & Sons (Strucsteel) Ltd of Christchurch, Dorset for steel framed buildings, bridges and other structures.
- Romo Ltd of Kirkby in Ashfield for furnishing and upholstery fabrics and wall coverings.
- Nottinghamshire STG Aerospace Ltd of Swaffham, Norfolk for next generation emergency power systems, and photoluminescent emergency floorpath marking systems for aircraft.
- Sheffield Forgemasters International Limited of Sheffield, South Yorkshire for large steel castings and forgings.
- Signet International Limited of Colnbrook, Berkshire for freight forwarding services.
- Leonard Simmonds Associates Ltd (trading as LSA) of Malvern, Worcestershire for traded endowment insurance policies for endowments.
- Spirit Yachts Ltd of Ipswich, Suffolk for sailing yachts and power boats.
- The Sporting Exchange (trading as Betfair) of London W6 for betting services and online gaming products
- Superior Group Limited of Wimborne, Dorset for precision rubber seals.
- Symbian Ltd of London SE1 for mobile phone software development and licensing
- TRL Technology Ltd of Tewkesbury, Gloucestershire for design, manufacture and integration of innovative defence solutions.
- TRP Sealing Systems Ltd of Hereford for elastomeric gaskets.
- TRW Occupant Safety Systems - Peterlee of Peterlee, County Durham for automotive occupant safety systems
- TTP Group plc of Melbourn, Hertfordshire for technology and product development.
- Thermserve Limited of Telford, Shropshire for equipment for the aluminium industry.
- Vascutek Limited of Inchinnan, Renfrewshire, for vascular prostheses for human implant.
- Vitabiotics Ltd of London NW2 for vitamin supplements and nutraceuticals.
- Vodec Industrial Communications Ltd of Nottingham for public address and general alarm systems.
- Weir Minerals Europe Limited of Todmorden, Lancashire for abrasion and corrosion resistant slurry equipment.
- Wirth Research Limited of Whittlebury, for automotive research and development.
- Xiros plc of Leeds, West Yorkshire Innovative medical implants used in minimally-invasive and tissue-sparing surgical procedures
