= The Queen's Award for Enterprise: International Trade (Export) (1980) =

The Queen's Award for Enterprise: International Trade (Export) (1980) was awarded on 21 April 1980, by Queen Elizabeth II.

== Recipients ==
The following organisations were awarded this year.

- Aero-Print Ltd, of Aylesbury, Buckinghamshire.
- Alcan Plate Ltd, of Birmingham.
- Allied Colloids Ltd, of Bradford, West Yorkshire.
- Ames Crosta Babcock Ltd, of Heywood, Lancashire.
- Amey Roadstone Construction Ltd, of Abingdon, Oxfordshire.
- W. S Atkins Group Ltd, of Epsom, Surrey.
- Babcock Woodall-Duckha'm Ltd, of Crawley, West Sussex.
- Binnie & Partners, of London, SW1.
- Bostwick Doors (UK) Ltd, of Stockport, Greater Manchester.
- Brickhouse Dudley Ltd, of Tipton, West Midlands.
- Bristol Packaging Machines Ltd, of Bristol.
- British Airways Engine Overhaul Ltd, of Cardiff.
- British Nuclear Fuels Ltd, of Warrington, Cheshire.
- Capper-Neill International Ltd, of Warrington, Cheshire.
- J. H Clissold & Son Ltd, of Bradford, West Yorkshire.
- Cojana International Fashions Ltd, of London, W1.
- Coline Ltd, of Hatfield, Hertfordshire.
- Davy McKee (Minerals & Metals) Ltd, of Stockton-on-Tees, Cleveland.
- Detexomat Machinery Ltd, of High Wycombe, Buckinghamshire.
- The Byron International Division of Dobson Park (Engineering) Ltd, of Nottingham.
- Dowty Mining Equipment Ltd, of Gloucester.
- Dowty Rotol Ltd, of Gloucester.
- Drallim Telecommunications Ltd, of Bexhill-on-Sea, East Sussex.
- The Drum Engineering Company Ltd, of Bradford, West Yorkshire.
- Electroheating (London) Ltd, of London, SW19.
- S. & S Ellis Ltd, of London, E3.
- The Financial Times Ltd, of London, EC4.
- Frankel Microfilm Holdings Ltd, of Stanmore, Middlesex.
- G.E.C. Turbine Generators Ltd, of Rugby.
- G.T.S. Flexible Materials Ltd, of Bracknell, Berkshire.
- Gardners Transformers Ltd, of Christchurch, Dorset.
- Gemmill and Dunsmore Ltd, of Preston, Lancashire.
- James Gentles and Son, of Edinburgh.
- Hardy Spicer Ltd, of Birmingham.
- Healey Mouldings Ltd, of Warley, West Midlands.
- Hobourn-Eaton Ltd, of Rochester, Kent.
- Hughes Tool Company Ltd, of London, W1.
- I.D.M. Electronics Ltd, of Reading, Berkshire.
- Jackstone Froster Ltd, of Grimsby, South Humberside.
- Kearney & Trecker Marwin Ltd, of Brighton, East Sussex.
- Lamcoat Papers Ltd, of Clitheroe, Lancashire.
- Lansing Bagnall Ltd, of Basingstoke, Hampshire.
- Lee Howl & Co. Ltd, of Tipton, West Midlands.
- Lewmar Marine Ltd, of Havant, Hampshire.
- Linotype-Paul Ltd, of Cheltenham, Gloucestershire.
- R A Lister & Company, Ltd, of Dursley, Gloucestershire.
- Loewy Robertson Engineering Company Ltd, of Poole, Dorset.
- McCain International Ltd, of Scarborough, North Yorkshire.
- Macdonald Greenlees Ltd, of Edinburgh.
- Sir M MacDonald & Partners Ltd, of Cambridge.
- Manesty Machines Ltd, of Liverpool.
- Marconi Radar Systems Ltd, of Chelmsford, Essex.
- J. Marr and Son Ltd, of Hull, Humberside.
- The Mars Money Systems Division of Mars Ltd, of Slough, Berkshire.
- The Mercantile and General Reinsurance Company Ltd, of London, EC.2.
- The Electrical Division of Newage Engineers Ltd, of Stamford, Lincolnshire.
- Norman Magnetics Ltd, of Farnborough, Hampshire.
- Oilfield Inspection Services Ltd, of Aberdeen.
- Peboc Ltd, of Llangefni, Gwynedd.
- Pinneys Smokehouses Ltd, of Annan, Dumfriesshire.
- Quantel Ltd, of Caterham, Surrey.
- Racal-Datacom Ltd, of Salisbury, Wiltshire.
- Racal-Redac Ltd, of Tewkesbury, Gloucestershire.
- The Rank Taylor Hobson Division of Rank Precision Industries Ltd, of Leicester.
- Rank Xerox Ltd, London, NW1.
- Raychem Ltd, of Swindon, Wiltshire.
- Redifon Simulation Ltd, of Crawley, West Sussex.
- Redler Conveyors Ltd, of Stroud, Gloucestershire.
- Reynolds Medical Ltd, of Hertford.
- Stewart Ross and Company Ltd, of Sandridge, St. Albans, Hertfordshire.
- Round Oak Steel Works Ltd, of Brierley Hill, West Midlands.
- The Ryvita Company Ltd, of Poole, Dorset.
- The Aircraft Division of Short Brothers Ltd, of Belfast.
- A. O Smith Harvestore Products Ltd, of Eye, Suffolk.
- Sodastream Ltd, of Peterborough, Cambridgeshire.
- Sony (UK) Ltd, of Bridgend, Mid-Glamorganshire.
- Standard Chartered Bank, of London, EC4.
- Trusthouse Forte Ltd, of London, SW1.
- J. G Turney & Son Ltd, of London, SW1.
- The Design and Projects Division of Vickers Ltd, of Eastleigh, Hampshire.
- The Howson-Algraphy Group of Vickers Ltd, of Leeds.
- John Walker and Sons Ltd, of London, SW1.
- Wearwell Ltd, of London, E1.
- Josiah Wedgwood & Sons Ltd, of Stoke-on-Trent, Staffordshire.
- Westall Richardson Ltd, of Sheffield.
- Whatman Biochemicals Ltd, of Maidstone, Kent.
- Wimet Ltd, of Coventry, West Midlands.
