= Du Plessis v De Klerk =

South African legal case

- Court: Constitutional Court of South Africa
- Full case name: Du Plessis and Others v De Klerk and Another
- Decided: 15 May 1996
- Docket nos.: CCT 8/95
- Citations: [1996] ZACC 10; 1996 (3) SA 850; 1996 (5) BCLR 658

Case history
- Prior actions: Supreme Court of South Africa, Transvaal Provincial Division – De Klerk and Another v Du Plessis and Others 1995 (2) SA 40 (T); 1994 (6) BCLR 124 (T)

Court membership
- Judges sitting: Chaskalson P, Mahomed DP, Ackermann, Didcott, Kriegler, Langa, Madala, Mokgoro, O'Regan and Sachs JJ

Case opinions
- Decision by: Kentridge AJ (Chaskalson, Langa and O'Regan concurring)
- Concurrence: Mahomed DP (Langa and O'Regan concurring)
- Concurrence: Ackermann J
- Concurrence: Mokgoro J
- Concurrence: Sachs J
- Concur/dissent: Madala J
- Dissent: Kriegler J (Didcott concurring)

Du Plessis and Others v De Klerk and Another is a 1996 decision of the Constitutional Court of South Africa. Though arising from a defamation case in the law of delict, it had broad significance for the application of the Interim Constitution both to pre-constitutional conduct and to private disputes. The majority judgment was written by Acting Justice Sydney Kentridge and the leading dissent by Justice Johann Kriegler.

The case emanated from a defamation lawsuit brought against the Pretoria News in the Transvaal Provincial Division, and the Constitutional Court was called to decide whether the constitutional right to freedom of expression could found a defence against defamation when the defamatory statement was published before the Interim Constitution came into effect. On this question, the court was unanimous in holding that the Interim Constitution did not have retroactive force: it did not render lawful pre-constitutional conduct that had been unlawful under the prevailing pre-constitutional law.

However, the court was also called to decide whether and how, in the post-constitutional period, constitutional rights could have horizontal application to legal relationships between non-state actors. For the majority, Acting Justice Kentridge held that, in general, constitutional rights could not be enforced directly against non-state actors, but that the Bill of Rights would nonetheless have indirect application to private law insofar as the Constitution required courts to develop the common law in line with the values of the Bill of Rights. Justice Kriegler dissented vociferously on this point, finding that all constitutional rights were capable of direct application to private disputes.

== Background ==
In early 1993, the Pretoria News published a series of articles about the alleged involvement of South African citizens in covert operations to supply arms to UNITA, the Angolan rebel movement. Two of those articles, published in March, mentioned Gert de Klerk and his company, Wonder Air, as implicated in such operations. De Klerk and Wonder Air sued in the Supreme Court of South Africa, claiming damages for defamation against Pretoria News; its editor, Deon du Plessis; its publisher, Allied Publishing; and the journalist, Dale Lautenbach.

== Court action ==
During the course of the defamation proceedings, the Interim Constitution of 1993 came into force. Thereafter the defendants amended their plea to add a defence based on section 15(1) of the Interim Constitution, a provision of the Bill of Rights, which provided that:

Every person shall have the right to freedom of speech and expression, which shall include freedom of the press and other media, and the freedom of artistic creativity and scientific research.

The defendants contended that the publication of the articles was not unlawful because it was protected by this right to freedom of expression. However, the defendants opposed the amendment to the plea on three separate grounds. First, the publication of the articles, and the consequent damage to the plaintiffs, had taken place before the Interim Constitution came into effect, and the Interim Constitution did not have retroactive force. Second, and alternatively, the Constitution did not have horizontal application and therefore did not apply to the dispute. And, third, alternatively, section 15 of the Interim Constitution in any case did not protect the publication of defamatory material, either because the common law of defamation constituted a justifiable limitation on the right to freedom of expression or because the plaintiffs' constitutional right to reputation and "emotional integrity" took precedence over the defendants' right to defamatory expression.

On 10 November 1994, Judge Kees van Dijkhorst of the Transvaal Provincial Division ruled in favour of the plaintiffs, finding that the Interim Constitution was not applicable to the dispute on two separate grounds: first, the Interim Constitution was non-retroactive, and, second, it had no horizontal application. The amended plea was therefore refused, and the defendants were granted leave to appeal that ruling in the Constitutional Court of South Africa.

The Constitutional Court heard argument on 7 November 1995 and delivered judgment on 15 May 1996. It was called to decide whether the Constitution could be invoked in defamation proceedings in which all relevant facts had occurred before the Constitution came into force. In addition to this, it dealt with two further constitutional questions on referral: whether the Bill of Rights (Chapter 3 of the Interim Constitution) had horizontal application, to relationships between non-state parties; and whether the Constitutional Court – as opposed to, or in addition to, the Appellate Division of the Supreme Court – had jurisdiction to develop the common law (in this case, the common law of defamation), if such development was called for to make the common law consistent with the Constitution.

== Judgments and order ==
Dividing along several lines on various legal points, the Constitutional Court filed seven opinions in the matter. The majority judgment was written by Acting Justice Sydney Kentridge and joined by Justice President Arthur Chaskalson and Justices Pius Langa and Kate O'Regan. Langa and O'Regan, but not Kentridge and Chaskalson, additionally joined in a separate concurring judgment written by Justice Deputy President Ismail Mahomed, who was in broad agreement with Kentridge but raised several differences of emphasis or reasoning. Likewise, Justices Laurie Ackermann, Yvonne Mokgoro, and Albie Sachs separately wrote their own concurring judgments, in each case seeking to expand on their personal views on the horizontality debate; Mokgoro additionally expressed her concurrence with Mahomed's minority opinion. Finally, there were two dissenting judgments, one prepared by Justice Tholie Madala and the other prepared by Justice Johann Kriegler and joined by Justice John Didcott.

The order of the court, as set out in Kentridge's majority judgment, dismissed the defendants' appeal against the decision of the Supreme Court. The appeal was dismissed on the grounds that the defendants were, as the Supreme Court had held, not entitled to invoke the provisions of the Constitution as a defence against pre-constitutional defamation. This finding and conclusion was unanimous, though Mahomed and Kriegler's minority opinions raised certain qualms with Kentridge's opinion. The appeal having been dismissed, the two further legal questions – about horizontal application and jurisdiction to develop the common law – were not of relevance to the defamation dispute, but the court, finding them to be of public importance, answered them anyway.

Thus, on the second major question, Kentridge set out the majority's view that the Constitution generally was not capable of application to private relationships. The court divided on this finding: Madala and Kriegler dissented, while Mahomed, Ackermann, Mokgoro, and Sachs all wrote in support of Kentridge, though such support differed in nature and degree.

== Reasoning ==
=== Retroactive effect ===
==== Kentridge ====
The court was unanimous in joining Acting Justice Kentridge's conclusion that the defendants could not invoke their section 15 rights as a defence against defamation committed before the Interim Constitution came into effect, and that the appeal therefore stood to be dismissed. In sum, per Kentridge, there was nothing "in the Constitution which suggests that conduct unlawful before the Constitution came into force is now to be deemed to be lawful" by reason of the Bill of Rights. In seeking to forestall this conclusion, the defendants had relied heavily on S v Mhlungu, in which Justice Ismail Mahomed had found for a majority of the court that defendants were protected by the Bill of Rights in criminal proceedings that were pending before the commencement of the Constitution. However, as Kentridge explained, such protections were not properly retroactive in the sense of invalidating conduct that had been valid at the time it was committed, or vice versa.

Similarly, in S v Makwanyane and S v Williams, the court had found that persons convicted before the commencement of the Constitution were nonetheless protected by the Bill of Rights against undergoing cruel and inhuman punishment, but this did not entail that the cruel and inhuman sentences had been unlawful at the pre-constitutional time that they were imposed; the Constitution merely established that it would be unlawful to execute such sentences in the post-constitutional period. Thus Kentridge also rejected the defendants' argument that the Constitution could relieve them of the post-constitutional consequences of their pre-constitutional conduct. In the case of unlawful defamation, the plaintiffs had accrued a right to damages at the moment that the defamation was published, and "there is no warrant in the Constitution for depriving a person of property [the right to damages] which he lawfully held before the Constitution came into force by invoking against him a right [to free expression] which did not exist at the time when the right of property vested in him".

Finally, Kentridge turned to the retroactivity not of the Constitution itself but of post-constitutional court orders. This question arose from section 98(6) of the Constitution, which dealt with the application of judicial orders declaring a pre-constitutional law to be constitutionally invalid. The relevant provision held that such a declaration "shall not invalidate anything done or permitted in terms [of that law] before the coming into effect of such declaration of invalidity", "unless the Constitutional Court in the interests of justice and good government orders otherwise". This provision therefore awarded the Constitutional Court the discretion to ante-date the operation of a declaration of invalidity, but Kentridge held that, "it could hardly be suggested that any such declaration could refer to a date earlier than the date of the commencement of the Constitution." Nonetheless, he added a broad qualification on the "general principle" that the Constitution did not have retrospective effect:

The consequences of that general principle are, however, not necessarily invariable. In the present case we are dealing with the right to damages for a defamation committed before the Constitution came into operation, and we hold that nothing in the Constitution impairs that right. But we leave open the possibility that there may be cases where the enforcement of previously acquired rights would in the light of our present constitutional values be so grossly unjust and abhorrent that it could not be countenanced, whether as being contrary to public policy or on some other basis. It is not necessary to spell out examples. It is sufficient to say that cases such as the one before us obviously do not fall into that category.

==== Mahomed ====
Deputy President Mahomed's concurring judgment agreed with Kentridge on retroactivity, but sought to emphasise Kentridge's qualification that the court might be permitted retrospectively to invalidate pre-constitutional rights in exceptional cases, "where the enforcement after the Constitution of rights acquired prior to the Constitution would be plainly inconsistent with our present constitutional values". In addition, per Mahomed:

I would prefer to leave open the question whether or not, following on a declaration of invalidity, this Court has jurisdiction in terms of section 98(6) of the Constitution, to make an order invalidating something which was done (or permitted to be done) at a time when the Constitution was not operative at all. It may arguably be contended in some suitable case that the interests of justice and good government justify an order which invalidates anything previously done or permitted in terms of an invalid law even if the Constitution was not operative at the time when it was so done or permitted... Even if section 98(6) was to be construed as permitting a retrospective order of the kind I have alluded to in certain circumstances, the factual circumstances in the present case would not justify such an order.

==== Kriegler ====
Justice Kriegler's dissent concurred in Kentridge's order on retroactive resort to section 15, agreeing that the Mhlungu holding was irrelevant to the defendants' case. However, he differed with Kentridge's interpretation of the textual provisions supporting that conclusion. In particular, like Mahomed, Kriegler preferred to "leave open" whether section 98(6) permitted the Constitutional Court to invalidate pre-constitutional conduct that had been lawful in terms of a law later found to be unconstitutional – in other words, to leave open the possibility that declarations of invalidity could be ante-dated to a pre-constitutional date.

=== Horizontal effect ===
==== Kentridge ====
In Acting Justice Kentridge's summary, the question about the horizontal application of the Bill of Rights was, in the main, the question of whether constitutional rights "govern the relationships between individuals, and may be invoked by them in their private law disputes". It was self-evident that the Bill of Rights had vertical application, protecting persons against the wrongful exercise of public power, but it was a contentious issue whether it had only vertical application. Moreover, Kentridge noted that the horizontal–vertical dichotomy could be misleading and did not "do full justice to the nuances of the jurisprudential debate" – thus, for example, the United States Supreme Court had "effectively", if not technically, applied the American Bill of Rights and Fourteenth Amendment horizontally to private conduct in such cases as Shelley v. Kraemer and Burton v. Wilmington Parking Authority.

In the South African case, Kentridge held for the majority that the provisions of the Bill of Rights – and section 15 in particular – were "not in general" capable of application to private relationships or private disputes, and instead applied only to relationships between persons and the state. This followed most directly from section 7(1), which provided that the Bill of Rights "shall bind all legislative and executive organs of state at all levels of government." Per Kentridge:

Entrenched Bills of Rights are ordinarily intended to protect the subject against legislative and executive action, and the emphatic statement in section 7(1) must mean that Chapter 3 [the Bill of Rights] is intended to be binding only on the legislative and executive organs of state. Had the intention been to give it a more extended application that could have been readily expressed... It would be surprising if as important a matter as direct horizontal application were to be left to be implied.

However, Kentridge was careful only to hold that the Bill of Rights did not have general horizontal application, because "it may be open to a litigant in another case to argue that some particular provision of Chapter 3 must by necessary implication have direct horizontal application". Yet it was clear that section 15 was not such amenable to such an argument.

The majority also made further qualifications on its finding that there was no horizontal application. In private disputes, litigants could nonetheless challenge the constitutional validity of any statute on which the other party's conduct relied. Furthermore, in disputes with organs of government, litigants could challenge the constitutional validity of any common law on which the government's conduct relied. However, for Kentridge, this did not mean that the Bill of Rights could be directly applied to challenge the validity of the common law that governed private relationships; that would constitute a direct horizontal application, which the Constitution did not license. However, section 35(3) of the Constitution allowed the courts to "have due regard" to the Bill of Rights when they applied and developed the common law; by that route, the Bill of Rights "may and should have an influence on the development of the common law as it governs relations between individuals", and the Bill of Rights could therefore be applied indirectly to private disputes. The exercise of section 35(3) by courts would ensure that the values of the Bill of Rights "will permeate the common law in all its aspects, including private litigation" (and including the common law of defamation), and, as Supreme Court Judge Edwin Cameron had argued in Holomisa v Argus Newspapers, section 35(3) therefore made "much of the vertical/horizontal debate irrelevant."

==== Ackermann ====
In his concurring judgment, Justice Ackermann agreed that, for reasons outlined by Kentridge, the text of the Constitution "strongly favours" the conclusion that direct horizontal application of the Bill of Rights is not intended. He wrote to add that, "Whatever lingering doubts there might be on this score are resolved by teleological considerations", as born out by criticism of Shelley v. Kraemer in the United States and, in particular, by the German experience under the German Basic Law. He held that direct horizontal application would lead to "unsupportable" consequences, including legal uncertainty and a vastly expanded role for the Constitutional Court.

Instead, for Ackermann, the common law would be reformed for constitutional compliance by two mechanisms: first, as discussed by Kentridge, "the indirect radiating effect" of the Bill of Rights through judicial development of the common law under section 35(3); and, second, reforms passed by Parliament in ordinary legislation, "so that all laws which are being applied by the courts do already comply with the basic rights, obviating the need for direct horizontal application by the courts".

==== Kriegler ====
Justice Kriegler's dissenting judgment departed strongly from Kentridge's reasoning, finding that constitutional rights were capable of application to private legal relationships and that they could be enforced against private individuals as well as against the state. Kriegler opened with a notorious warning against his colleagues' incautious resort to comparative law, suggesting that the South African Constitution was "constructed on unique foundations, built according to a unique design and intended for unique purposes". In particular, Kriegler pointed out that, whereas the American Constitution was designed "to place limitations on governmental control", the South African Constitution "aims at establishing freedom and equality in a grossly disparate society". This emerged, inter alia, from the preamble and postscript to the Constitution, which made express reference to social division and conflict, as well as to the importance of national reconciliation. In such passages, the objectives of the Constitution went far beyond restraints on public power to encompass the relationship between private citizens.

In this and other respects, Kriegler rooted his argument in "the internal logic and cohesion" of the Bill of Rights, as he interpreted it in light of the broad objectives of the Constitution. Thus, for example, Kriegler's interpretation of section 7 was exactly contrary to Kentridge's:

Having regard to the clear intention, running throughout the section, to stretch the purview of Chapter 3 to its outermost boundaries, is it at all likely that a limitation as restrictive as that entailed in so-called verticality could have been contemplated? ...if indeed the drafters had such a major constraint in mind, why did they not say so? Instead they wax expansive, leaving it to the microscope of a "verticalist" to pick up hidden clues.

Kriegler concluded that the Bill of Rights:

has nothing to do with the ordinary relationships between private persons or associations. What it does govern, however, is all law, including that applicable to private relationships. Unless and until there is a resort to law, private individuals are at liberty to conduct their private affairs exactly as they please as far as the fundamental rights and freedoms are concerned... But none of them can invoke the law to enforce or protect their bigotry. One cannot claim rescission of a contract or specific performance thereof if such claim, albeit well-founded at common law, infringes a Chapter 3 right. One cannot raise a defence to a claim in law if such defence is in conflict with a protected right or freedom.

Kriegler was not convinced by Ackermann's contention that the consequences of this interpretation would be practically insupportable; indeed, he held that the consequences would be fundamentally the same as under as the "radiating" effect proposed by Ackermann. Moreover, he severely chastised public commentators for making the direct application of constitutional rights into a "bogeyman".

The second point concerns a pervading misconception held by some and, I suspect, an egregious caricature propagated by others. That is that so-called direct horizontality will result in an Orwellian society in which the all-powerful state will control all private relationships. The tentacles of government will, so it is said, reach into the marketplace, the home, the very bedroom. The minions of the state will tell me where to do my shopping, to whom to offer my services or merchandise, whom to employ and whom to invite to my bridge club. That is nonsense. What is more, it is malicious nonsense preying on the fears of privileged whites, cosseted in the past by laissez faire capitalism thriving in an environment where the black underclass had limited opportunity to share in the bounty. I use strong language designedly. The caricature is pernicious, it is calculated to inflame public sentiments and to cloud people’s perceptions of our fledgling constitutional democracy. "Direct horizontality" is a bogeyman...

– Justice Johann Kriegler on public discourse around the horizontal application of constitutional rights, para. 120–123

In line with this view of the constitutional scheme, Kriegler's interpretation of section 35 also differed from that proposed by Kentridge. In his view, section 35(3), on the development of the common law and other sources of law, would apply to cases in which "there is no direct infringement or claim of an infringement of a right protected under the Chapter". In other words, the indirect application envisaged by section 35(3) would not be the courts' first resort – as implied by Kentridge – but would instead provide a catch-all mechanism for ensuring that the Bill of Rights was considered in cases in which it was not directly applicable. The purpose of section 35(3), per Kriegler, was to ensure that, "that this Constitution is to permeate all that judges do just as it is to permeate all that the legislature and the executive do".

==== Madala ====
Justice Madala's judgment concurred in Kentridge's finding on retroactive application but joined Kriegler in dissenting from his finding on horizontal application. In Madala's view, "some of the rights in Chapter 3 lend themselves to direct horizontality while in respect of others, Chapter 3 is indirectly horizontally applicable". The availability of direct application would have to be evaluated on a case-by-case basis, through examination of "the nature and extent of the particular right, the values that underlie it, and the context in which the alleged breach of the right occurs"; however, it was clear in this case that the section 15 right did not have direct horizontal application.

In any event, Madala agreed both with Kriegler's argument that the Bill of Rights provided for direct horizontal application, and with Kentridge's explication of the effect of section 35(3) on the existing common law. Like Kriegler, Madala believed that the function of section 35(3) was to provide "for the indirect horizontal 'seepage' in those areas which are not touched directly by the provisions of Chapter 3", thus acting akin to the German model of Drittwirkung.

==== Mahomed ====
Deputy President Mahomed, while concurring with Kentridge's finding on horizontal application, sought to demonstrate that the theoretical debates between Kentridge and Kriegler "involve no substantial practical consequences" and "cannot properly be characterized" as a debate about horizontal application. First, Kentridge had acknowledged that any statute could be tested directly against the Bill of Rights, whether in private litigation or litigation involving the state; likewise, in any litigation involving the state, the common law could be tested directly against the Bill of Rights. Therefore, any disagreement between Kentridge and Kriegler arose only in cases where the common law was attacked in private litigation.

Second, even in that limited range of problematic cases, Kentridge's approach allowed the Bill of Rights to have "horizontal" effect, just as Kriegler's did. The difference was that, on Kentridge's approach, the horizontal effect would arise pursuant to section 35(3), as a consequence of the development of the common law in light of the Bill of Rights, rather than arising from a direct application of the relevant constitutional right. That difference was not of practical significance: Kentridge's approach was equally capable of preventing the "privatisation of Apartheid" and of serving the vision of freedom and equality embodied in the Constitution; it was "potentially no less richer and creative" than direct horizontal application would be. Mahomed therefore sought to emphasise Kentridge's point that, even if constitutional rights did not have direct horizontal application, the common law rules that governed private disputes "would themselves be vulnerable to invasion and re-examination in appropriate circumstances" under section 35(3).

==== Mokgoro ====
Justice Mokgoro's separate opinion concurred with Kentridge's findings and also supported Mahomed's remarks about the active development of the common law under section 35(3). Her opinion sought to emphasise a point touched on briefly by the other opinions: that customary law would also stand to be developed under section 35(3). This point was significant because, in the pre-constitutional period, customary law had been "lamentably marginalised, and allowed to degenerate into a vitrified set of norms alienated from its roots in the community"; there was therefore significant scope to develop it.

==== Sachs ====
In his concurring judgment, Justice Sachs explained that he preferred Kentridge's approach over Kriegler's because he regarded it "as being most consistent with the well-functioning constitutional democracy contemplated by the Constitution". For Sachs, though he agreed with Kriegler that the Constitution was intended to be "all-pervasive and transformatory", positive constitutional rights were intended to be enforced and implemented primarily through legislative intervention, rather than through judicial intervention. In this light, direct horizontal application was offensive to the separation of powers. Per Sachs:

The Constitution contemplates a democracy functioning within a constitutional framework, not a dikastocracy within which Parliament has certain residual powers. The role of the courts is not effectively to usurp the functions of the legislature, but to scrutinize the acts of the legislature. It should not establish new, positive rights and remedies on its own. The function of the courts, I believe, is, in the first place, to ensure that legislation does not violate fundamental rights, secondly, to interpret legislation in a manner that furthers the values expressed in the Constitution, and, thirdly, to ensure that common law and custom outside of the legislative sphere is developed in such a manner as to harmonise with the Constitution. In this way, the appropriate balance between the legislature and the judiciary is maintained.

=== Jurisdiction over common law ===
==== Kentridge ====
For Acting Justice Kentridge, it was clear that the development of the common law under section 35(3) of the Constitution was a task for the Appellate Division and not for the Constitutional Court. In most cases, the common law could be developed in a number of different directions, under a number of possible rules, all equally viable under the Constitution; and the Constitutional Court's limited jurisdiction, set out in section 98, did not authorise it to choose among those options. However:

This is not to say that the Constitutional Court has no control over how the common private law develops. In terms of section 98(2) it has jurisdiction in the final instance over all matters relating to "the interpretation, protection and enforcement of the provisions of this Constitution". It must ensure that the provisions of section 35(3) in relation, inter alia, to the development of the common law are properly interpreted and applied, otherwise it is not discharging its duty properly in relation to the enforcement of the provisions of the Constitution. The Constitutional Court has jurisdiction to determine what the "spirit, purport and objects" of Chapter 3 are and to ensure that, in developing the common law, the other courts have had "due regard" thereto. It is unnecessary, for the purposes of this judgment, to define the boundaries of its jurisdiction in this regard.

For Kentridge, the question of the Constitutional Court's authority to develop and constitutionalise the common law was closely related to the question of horizontal application. Were horizontal application permitted, constitutional rights could and would be invoked in private litigation at common law. Those disputes would therefore become "constitutional matters", and, under the Interim Constitution, appeals would therefore lie in the exclusive jurisdiction of the Constitutional Court. This was problematic for two main reasons. First, in declaring a common law rule to be inconsistent with the Constitution, the court would leave "a lacuna in the law" – a lacuna which, as already mentioned, its limited jurisdiction did not authorise it to fill. Second, "the Appellate Division would be deprived of a substantial part of what has hitherto been its regular civil jurisdiction".

==== Mahomed ====
Deputy President Mahomed agreed with Kentridge that the exercise of the section 35(3) function engaged the jurisdiction of the Appellate Division, but that the Constitutional Court held "the residual power to determine, in suitable circumstances, whether in the application of its jurisdiction in terms of section 35(3) the Supreme Court has in any particular case properly had regard to the spirit of Chapter 3 of the Constitution and its purport and objects."

==== Kriegler ====
In his dissenting judgment, Justice Kriegler again differed from Kentridge's conclusions. He concluded that the development of the common law, under section 35(3), was within the jurisdiction of both the Constitutional Court and the Appellate Division. In his reading of the Constitution, the envisaged division of labour was that the Constitutional Court would (with exclusive jurisdiction) apply and adapt the common law in matters where the Bill of Rights was directly applicable – that is, in matters that turned on an alleged infringement of a constitutional right. In all other cases, the Appellate Division would apply and adapt the common law with due regard to the Bill of Rights, as instructed in section 35(3).

== Significance ==
The judgment's discussion of horizontal application was hotly debated in an already contentious academic literature on the subject.

The final Constitution of 1996, which superseded the Interim Constitution, was more clearly amenable to the direct resort to constitutional rights in private disputes, and the Constitution Seventeenth Amendment simplified the concomitant jurisdictional issues by granting the Constitutional Court the authority to hear all matters, not only "constitutional" matters. Nonetheless, the horizontal application issue remained contentious. However, under the final Constitution, the Constitutional Court ultimately applied the Bill of Rights directly to the common law of defamation in Khumalo v Holomisa, and, several years later, in Ramakatsa v Magashule, it accepted that constitutional rights could provide a cause of action in private disputes.
