= Meketa Investment Group =

American investment advisory firm

Meketa Investment Group Inc.
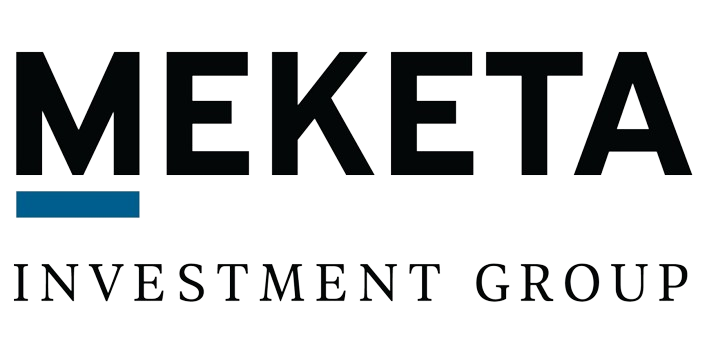
- Company type: Private
- Industry: Financial services
- Founded: 1978; 48 years ago
- Founder: James Meketa
- Headquarters: Westwood, Massachusetts, U.S.
- Key people: James Meketa (Chairman); Stephen McCourt (Co-CEO); Peter Woolley (Co-CEO)
- Products: Investment management; Alternative investments
- AUM: US$35 billion (January 2024)
- Total assets: US$2.0trillion (under advisement) (January 2024)
- Number of employees: Approx. 240 (March 2024)
- Website: meketa.com

Meketa Investment Group (Meketa) is a US investment management and advisory firm headquartered in Westwood, Massachusetts. The company provides investments in both public and private markets to institutional investors.

== Background ==
Meketa was originally founded in 1974 as an investment partnership by James Meketa before it was incorporated under Massachusetts law in 1978 and became registered with the U.S. Securities and Exchange Commission as an investment advisor. James began his career working for the Harvard University endowment. In 1978, the firm was hired by its first pension fund client. Meketa rose to prominence as a purveyor of investment advice to pension funds, financial endowments and foundations.

In 1994, Meketa started advising clients on investments related to real estate.

In June 2014, Meketa expanded outside the U.S. by opening an office in London to establish a presence in Europe.

In July 2015, James Meketa who had been CEO of the firm stepped down from his position and Stephen McCourt and Peter Woolley would succeed him as Co-CEOs. A Co-CEO structure was chosen due to the firm's geographic breath where McCourt would be based in San Diego while Woolley would be based at the firm's headquarters in Boston. James would take on a new position as Chairman of the board of directors for Meketa where both McCourt and Woolley would report to him. In addition, the board of directors expanded to include additional employees.

In January 2019, Meketa announced that it would be merging with Pension Consulting Alliance (PCA), a boutique consulting firm based in Portland, Oregon that similarly to Meketa, also advised pension funds. This came at a time the industry had heightened competition and more pressure on fees. The combined firm would keep the Meketa brand name and have $1.7 trillion in assets under advisement and $11 billion in assets under management.

In July 2021, James Meketa stated that there were three factors that investors should consider when investing. An aging baby boomer generation, the emergence of China as an economic superpower and the effects of climate change.

According to Nasdaq in October 2023, Meketa was the most active investment consultant in the first half of 2023 with regards to private market strategies. It came ahead of its peers, Hamilton Lane, Albourne Partners, Aksia and StepStone Group.

In February 2024, Meketa launched a infrastructure fund from its newly created division, Meketa Capital. While Meketa previously focused on institutional investors this fund was aimed at retail investors.

Meketa is entirely employee owned. Throughout the years, it has expanded its ownership to include more employees.
