= George Dibbern =

German writer and yachtsman (1889–1962)

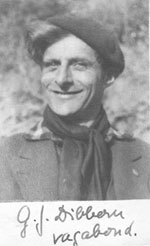

George John Dibbern (born Georg Johann Dibbern; March 26, 1889 – June 12, 1962) was an author, adventurer, and sailor-philosopher. He was a free-thinker, a self-declared citizen of the world, and a friend of American author Henry Miller.

== Life ==
Georg Johann Dibbern was born on March 26, 1889, in Kiel, Germany to Sea Captain Adolph Friedrich Dibbern (1845-1895) and Emma Juliane Tantau (1850-1907) who married in 1875. His sisters were Anna Marie Dibbern (1877-?) and Agnes Katharina Dorothea (1879-1925). At age 50, Adolph died from complications due to malaria contracted while at sea.

Because Dibbern suffered from asthma, his mother took him and his sisters to Sicily for two years (1899-1901). After his return to Germany, he spent his secondary school years in Marne, with his sister Anni and her husband Ludwig Schramm, a high school teacher. He completed his final exams in 1907 and went to sea as an apprentice aboard the Flying P line square-rigger Pamelia, to Valparaiso, Chile. In 1909 Dibbern jumped ship, the Antuco, in Sydney, Australia. He worked for a time on the Ten Tunnels Deviation (which bypassed the Great Zig Zag railway) and later as a waiter at the Hydro Majestic Hotel, in Medlow Bath in the Blue Mountains. In 1910 he went briefly to New Zealand before returning to Germany.

In 1911 Dibbern returned to Sydney aboard the steamer Scharnhorst to begin a business selling canvas canoes. When that failed, he headed to New Zealand. Since he had learned to drive, Dibbern became a chauffeur to the Maori in the area of Dannevirke until he was interned as an enemy alien on Somes Island in June 1918 . In May 1919 Dibbern was repatriated to Germany aboard the Willochra with about 900 other interned aliens, among them Captain Carl Kircheiß and Count Felix von Luckner.

Being back in Germany that same year, Dibbern met Elisabeth Vollbrandt, 11 years his junior. They married in January 1921 and in anticipation of reparation funds for assets left behind in New Zealand, purchased a property in Stocksee, a small municipality in northern Germany. There, their son Jens Rangi was born in 1921, but died six months later, their daughter Frauke Wahine was born in 1922, followed by Elke Maata in 1924 and Sunke Tai in 1925.

Throughout those years of rampant inflation, the reparation money dwindled to virtually nothing and the property at Stocksee was sold. To make a living Dibbern began to write short stories of his adventures in the Antipodes, to appear in Vossische Zeitung and other German periodicals with the help of Baron Albrecht von Fritsch. His wife supplemented their income with artistic Scherenschnitte (scissor cuts) which were later declared degenerate art by the Nazi Party. Dibbern tried several business ventures which all failed. He invested the money made from the sale of Stocksee in the boatyard Tetsche Möller near Kiel. When that business went bankrupt in 1925 Dibbern was left with the unfinished hull of a 10-metre Baltic double-ender. Inspired by Kurt von Boeckmann's book Vom Kulturreich des Meeres he named the boat Te Rapunga, being Maori for “Longing” or “Dark Sun”. He later wrote, the Polynesian mythology he knew so well from New Zealand was "ably interpreted for the German mind. [...] The whole book inspired me, and in it my wife and I found the name of the boat."

Reduced to workfare, Dibbern, whose views differed from his co-workers, talked himself into a corner and found he had no choice but to leave his family and sail to his Maori spiritual mother, Rangi Rangi Paewai, in New Zealand. The Te Rapunga left Kiel in August 1930 with a crew consisting of him, his nephew Günter Schramm, Baron Albrecht von Fritsch (later known as René Halkett) and his sister Dorothée Leber von Fritsch. Baron von Fritsch soon left the crew. In 1936 he relocated to England.

Sailing the Mediterranean Dibbern connected with the likes of circumnavigator Conor O’Brien aboard Saoirse, and the Swiss couple, painter Charles Hofer and his artist and writer wife Cilette Ofaire on San Luca. Ofaire and Dibbern felt themselves to be soulmates and corresponded till his death in 1962. To earn some money the Te Rapunga took on paying passengers. By 1932 Dibbern, with Schramm and Leber von Fritsch crossed the Atlantic. In Panama, they met German pilot Elly Beinhorn. From Balboa they helmed north; too late for the 1932 Los Angeles Summer Olympics, they pressed on, arriving in San Francisco on 20 September 1932, after 101 days at sea without touching land.

In March 1934 the Te Rapunga arrived in Auckland, New Zealand. Dibbern learned that his spiritual mother Rangi Rangi Paewai, on whose help he had counted, had died. Back at sea the Te Rapunga participated in the second Trans-Tasman Race, from Auckland to Melbourne, along with Johnny Wray's Ngataki. The Te Rapunga won the 1934-35 race, about 1630 miles, in 18 days, 23 hours, 58 minutes. She also won the subsequent race to Hobart, Tasmania before returning to Auckland. Inspired by multiple chance-encounters during his cruises, Dibbern's new mission became to make Te Rapunga yacht of a friendship, a bridge of tolerance and brotherhood. He took a new crew and headed north to the Cook Islands, Hawaii, and Canada, arriving in Victoria, British Columbia, on July 1, 1937, with a flag representing his ideals as he refused to fly the obligatory German Swastika. That December the home of his wife Elisabeth in Berlin was ransacked by the Gestapo searching for evidence of her husband's perceived anti-German sentiments.

While in Vancouver Dibbern dictated the manuscript for his premiere book Quest to typist Gladys Nightingale (later known as Sharie Farrell who with her husband Allen Farrell became known as legendary wooden boat builders on the coast of British Columbia). Then, the Te Rapunga sailed in Desolation Sound with Canadian writer M. Wylie Blanchet, author of The Curve of Time.

Dibbern's Flag

In 1939 residency was denied Dibbern as he refused to take up arms for any country and he became widely known as a “man without a country.” With his remaining crew member from New Zealand, Eileen Morris, he sailed to San Francisco. He was invited to the Dan Seymour radio show “We the People” in New York City where he left the manuscript of Quest with publisher W.W. Norton. In 1940, in San Francisco, eight years before American actor and peace activist Garry Davis renounced his citizenship, Dibbern created his own passport declaring himself a “Friend of all peoples” and a "Citizen of the World."

I, George John Dibbern, through long years in different countries and sincere friendship with many people in many lands feel my place to be outside of nationality, a citizen of the world and a friend of all peoples. I recognize the divine origin of all nations and therefore their value in being as they are, respect their laws, and feel my existence solely as a bridge of good fellowship between them. This is why on my own ship I fly my own flag, why I have my own passport and so place myself without other protection under the goodwill of the world. – Text of Dibberns passport.

Forced to leave the United States, Dibbern sailed to Hawaii, where he met other wandering vessels such as Viator, a schooner en route from Tahiti; famous French sailor Éric de Bisschop with his catamaran Kaimiloa bound for France, the ketch Hula Gal heading for Seattle and Captain Harry Pidgeon with his Islander. Dibbern was permitted to stay a short while on Hawaii to effect repairs to Te Rapunga. Dibbern then decided to test his self-made flag and self-made passport and to return Eileen Morris to her home country New Zealand. But on arrival in Napier in January 1941, his passport was not acknowledged. Immediately he was interned as an enemy alien for the duration of the War - once again Somes Island. His book Quest was published in March 1941 while he was still held captive.

On October 10, 1945, Dibbern was released from Somes Island, but his movements were restricted. At the end of May 1946, he was still listed for deportation. By December 1946 he was finally free to sail again. Shortly after Eileen Morris gave birth to their daughter, Michela Lalani, born in 1947. They sailed in the South Seas, writing articles and working on a new manuscript titled Ship Without Port which remains unpublished. In 1950, while Eileen and Lani were in Napier, Dibbern returned to Hobart, Tasmania: “WORLD PASSPORT" the press reported, "German-born John George Dibbern (60) produced a homemade passport when he arrived at Hobart, Tasmania, in his ketch Te Rapunga, from New Zealand — and it was accepted!" Still in New Zealand Dibbern was given a Tattersall lottery ticket in partial payment for casual work. He shared the 10,000.- pound win with the donor of the ticket. With his half, he purchased Satellite (Woody) Island, where he envisioned a friendship retreat as he had with land purchased in Canada and on Partridge Island. Among his many friends he counted the founder of Ansett Airlines son, John Ansett who met him through Henry Miller, and Tasmanian Egyptologist and science fiction author, Herbert Leslie Greener.

For the 1954 Trans-Tasman Race, Dibbern chose the first all-female crew. They came in last but made history. That same year Eileen left Woody Island to return to Napier, New Zealand, to provide his daughter Lani with a more stable school environment. He put Satellite Island up for sale and returned to his mission of introducing people to the sea and sailing. In 1957, for the first time with an engine, he sailed differently. When the engine failed and Te Rapunga, was hit by a rogue wave, she was stranded near Greymouth, New Zealand. After all his years of sailing without mishap, again, in 1959 the Te Rapunga, dismasted and damaged in a severe hurricane, was towed into Auckland by the Japanese freighter Tokuwa Maru. Having the Te Rapunga refit he planned to sail from Auckland back to Germany to close the circle with his wife Elisabeth and their daughters with whom he had maintained contact by correspondence for 32 years. On June 12, 1962, George Dibbern died of a heart attack while on his way to mail a letter to his wife Elisabeth.

== Friendship with Henry Miller ==
After reading Quest, recommended to him by his friend Emil White (founder of the Henry Miller Memorial Library), American author Henry Miller wrote to Dibbern “as a brother” thus beginning a friendship by correspondence. He wrote a laudatory essay about Quest which appeared in Circle Magazine in 1946. It was later reprinted in Miller's Stand Still Like the Hummingbird (1962) and included in translation in the German edition of Quest. Miller's essay is still widely read.

No, it is the purity and integrity of men like Dibbern which make it difficult for them to fit into our world. Living his own life in his own way, Dibbern makes us realize how much life may be enjoyed even on the fringe of society. [...] It is society which rejects, not Dibbern. Dibbern merely refuses to play our rotten game. Nor will he wait to lead the ideal existence until some mythical day in the future. He will live the ideal life right now – as much as he dares and can. And that is the difference between a rebel and a man of spirit. It is a difference in Dibbern's favor.

Miller attempted to speed up payment of Dibbern's royalties for Quest. He sent relief packages to Elisabeth and the girls in post-war Germany; he urged friends and neighbours in Big Sur to do the same. He arranged for a typewriter to replace Elisabeth's which had been destroyed in the bombing of Berlin. He tried to get his own agent to take on George's new manuscript and insisted that Quest should be published in French (he appealed to Frédéric Jaques Temple) and in German. After the stranding of Te Rapunga in 1957, Miller sent out a broadsheet with Dibbern's story, urging readers to contribute money to help him refit the boat. On the obverse was Miller's 1946 Circle essay. Miller and Dibbern corresponded till Dibbern's death in 1962, but they never met.

Miller visited Elisabeth in Germany and instigated the German translation of Quest which appeared in 1965 as Unter eigener Flagge.

== Legacy ==
Dibbern's biography, endorsed by the Dibbern family, was authored by Erika Grundmann and in 2004 published as Dark Sun: Te Rapunga and the Quest of George Dibbern. "George Dibbern may or may not have realized his quest to discover the spirit of the Sea, but Erika Grundmann has done a credible job of reflecting the elusive spirit of a restless adventurer", the Boat Journal wrote.

A reprint edition of Quest was published by Grundmann in 2008.

Dibbern's yacht Te Rapunga was sold to a series of owners and ultimately ended up languishing and deteriorating until, in 2017, Bruny Island Coastal Retreats and Nature Pact, in Tasmania, bought her and are having her restored by Denman Marine in time for the 2021 Australian Wooden Boat Festival. George Dibbern's message remains timely and will live on through his beloved, reborn Te Rapunga.

German interest in Dibbern has been limited. Propelled by Erika Grundmann's research the story of Dibbern has been subject to articles published in magazines like mare Magazin and the Klassiker! Magazine by the Freundeskreis Klassische Yachten. A one-hour Radio feature was produced by German national station SWR and aired on Feb. 3, 2013. Most recently cultural anthropologist Martina Kleinert called attention to Dibbern already in the 1930s having lived a truly cosmopolitan life.

== Works ==
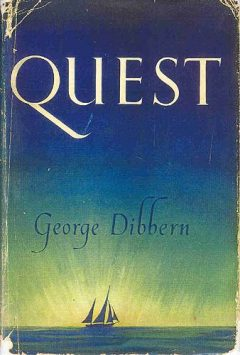
"Quest" by George Dibbern

=== Articles ===
- "Eine wilde Fahrt. Erinnerung aus Neuseeland", Hamburger Anzeiger, 12. April. 1927, p. 1-2
- "Der eilige Fahrgast", Windausche Zeitung, 16. Feb. 1929, p. 2

Various articles and travel reports for the NZ sailing magazine SeaSpray.

=== Books ===
- Quest. W. W. Norton, New York, NY, 1941
  - Reprint by RockRead Press, Manson's Landing, BC, 2008.
  - Unter eigener Flagge. German translation by Arno Dohm. Classen Verlag, Hamburg, 1965.
- Ship without Port. Unpublished manuscript

== Films ==
Videos on the restoration of the Te Rapunga are posted by current owner Bruny Island Coastal Retreats and Denman Marine on YouTube and Instagram.

Bruny Island has also assembled a short clip on the story of Dibbern titled "Who is George Dibbern".
