= Lüth case =

1958 verdict of the Federal Constitutional Court of Germany

- Court: Federal Constitutional Court (First Senate)
- Full case name: Erich Lüth gegen Veit Harlan
- Decided: 15 January 1958
- Citation: BVerfGE 7, 198; 1 BvR 400/51

Case history
- Prior actions: Harlan v. Lüth, Hamburg Regional Court 22 November 1951; Hamburg Higher Regional Court 1953

Court membership
- Judges sitting: Gerhard Leibholz, Erna Scheffler, Drath, Geiger, Federer, Wessel, Müller, Stein

Case opinions
- Unanimous opinion of the First Senate

Keywords
- Freedom of expression; horizontal effect of fundamental rights (Drittwirkung); Wechselwirkungslehre

The Lüth verdict (German: Lüth-Urteil) is a 1958 decision of the Federal Constitutional Court of the Federal Republic of Germany. In it, the First Senate held that the fundamental rights of the Basic Law form an "objective order of values" that radiates into all branches of law, including private law. This concept was later called the "indirect horizontal effect of fundamental rights" (German: mittelbare Drittwirkung) and stated that where a private-law rule limits a fundamental right, courts must balance the two interests in a proportionality-style "mutual-effect doctrine" (German: Wechselwirkungslehre). The case is cited as BVerfGE 7, 198 and is regarded as the most influential single decision in modern German constitutional jurisprudence.

== Background ==
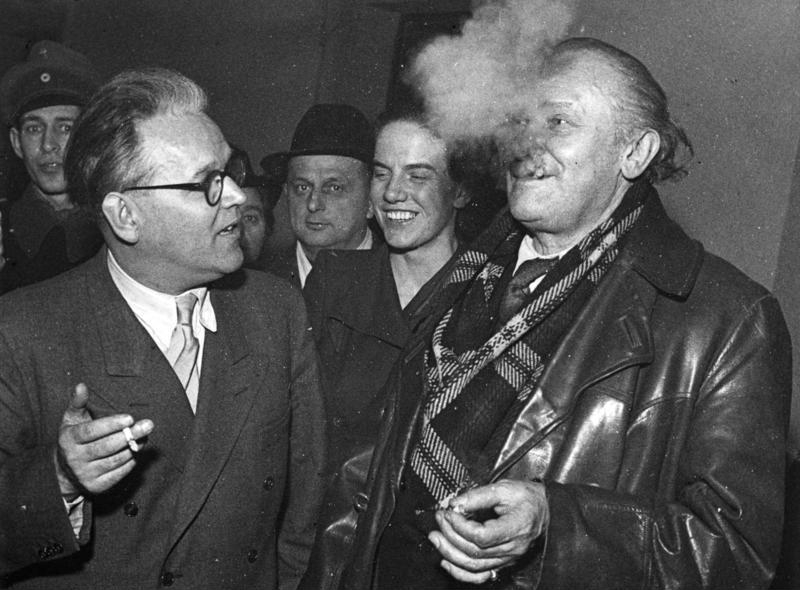
Veit Harlan (left) with the actor and defense witness Eugen Klöpfer at the Hamburg trial against Harlan for crimes against humanity, March 1949.

The dispute originated in Hamburg in 1950, after the press director of the Hamburg Senate Erich Lüth called to boycott the films of Veit Harlan, one of the in-house directors of the Nazi film industry under Joseph Goebbels.

Harlan's antisemitic feature Jud Süß was the most-screened title of the genre, shown to SS guards at extermination camps as part of their indoctrination. Hamburg juries put Harlan on trial for crimes against humanity in 1949 and again in 1950, in which he was acquitted both times. By 1951, Harlan was working on his first post-war film, Unsterbliche Geliebte (Immortal Beloved).

On September 20, 1950, Lüth opened a Hamburg film week with a speech that called for a boycott against Harlan's new picture. Lüth framed Harlan as "the most representative figure of the Nazi film industry" and argued that German cinema could not rebuild itself morally while Harlan returned to work. A few weeks later he repeated the call in an open letter to West German cinema owners and the trade press.

After a lawsuit by Harlan's distributor, the Hamburg Regional Court issued an injunction against Lüth on November 22, 1951, based on § 826 of the Bürgerliches Gesetzbuch (BGB), the rule against "intentional infliction of damage contrary to public policy". The Hamburg Higher Regional Court dismissed Lüth's appeal in 1953. In the following years, Lüth filed a complaint with the Federal Constitutional Court.

== Verdict ==
On 15 January 1958, the First Senate overturned the lower court rulings as a violation of Lüth's freedom of expression under Article 5 of the Basic Law.

The Senate's core move was to redefine what fundamental rights do. While they were still considered "subjective" defenses against the state, the Basic Law also "established an objective order of values" through them. That value order, the Senate wrote, informs every part of the legal system, including the parts traditionally treated as pure private law.

The Senate rejected the radical thesis that fundamental rights apply directly between private individuals. Instead, it was ruled that they take effect indirectly. The general clauses of the Civil Code, like "public policy" (German: gute Sitten) and good faith, must be read in the light of the relevant fundamental rights. German legal scholars later named this indirect effect mittelbare Drittwirkung.

Since Article 5(2) of the Basic Law allows freedom of expression to be limited by "general laws", the Senate viewed this relationship as reciprocal. As the general law limits the right, the right in return reflects back on the general law and limits its scope. Courts must therefore weigh right and limitation against each other in each specific case, a balancing act that German doctrine defined as Wechselwirkungslehre.

In regards to the factual basis, the Senate found that the Hamburg courts had failed to adequately allow Lüth to exercise his freedom of expression. It was ruled that Lüth's boycott call was a manifestation of a political and moral speech on a matter of public interest, not an exercise of a commercial market power. Additionally, it was found that the lower courts had ignored the historical context, specifically the public importance of German society distancing itself from the prominent figures of the Nazi cultural beacons. Therefore, Section 826 of the BGB could not be appealed to suppress that kind of speech expression.

== Aftermath ==
Lüth practically lost the boycott, since Harlan's film had already been distributed by the time the judgment came down. Harlan continued to direct films into the early 1960s and died in 1964. Lüth stayed at the Hamburg Press Office until 1964 and led the Hamburg Society for Christian-Jewish Cooperation until his death in 1989.

The judgment is taught in every German public-law course and is the most-cited decision in the official collection of Federal Constitutional Court judgments. The Court itself publicly lists the Lüth case among the "Milestones in the history of the Federal Constitutional Court". After the statutory protection period expired, the case files have been open to public in the Federal Archives in Koblenz since February 2018.

== Significance ==
The case has set the framework for the Federal Constitutional Court to use ever since in applying the constitutional provisions to private law situations, with two later cases to follow. The Soraya decision of 1973 (BVerfGE 34, 269) applied the same balancing concept for a different private-law right. The Stadium decision of 2018 (BVerfGE 148, 267) did the same for private bans on access to public goods. Lüth case was also the starting point of the modern German proportionality doctrine, which the Court built out further in the 1958 Pharmacy judgment and in the 1971 Mephisto judgment.

The implications of the case ruling also had international influence. The Constitutional Court of South Africa drew on the indirect horizontal effect doctrine in Du Plessis v De Klerk (1996) and on the objective-values reading of rights in its later jurisprudence. Scholars have argued that the same framework shaped the European Court of Human Rights in its post-1979 jurisprudence on the positive obligations of states under the European Convention, and also prompted the European Union Court of Justice to view fundamental rights as general principles of EU law.

It has also drawn sustained criticism. Ernst-Wolfgang Böckenförde argued in 1974 that the "objective order of values" risks turning the Federal Constitutional Court into a super-legislature and dissolving the line between political and judicial decision-making. Right-wing critics from the Schmittian tradition supported the same argument, and left-wing commentators have argued that the doctrine has been used to embed market-friendly economic positions in constitutional form. Justin Collings has argued that the Court's anti-Nazi stance in Lüth and other early cases later hardened into a "value formalism" that survived its original purpose.

== See also ==
- Federal Constitutional Court of Germany
- Basic Law for the Federal Republic of Germany
- Drittwirkung
- Du Plessis v De Klerk
