= The Queen's Award for Enterprise: International Trade (Export) (2009) =

'The Queen's Award for Enterprise: International Trade (Export) (2009)' was awarded on 21 April.

== Recipients ==
The following organisations were awarded this year.

- ATB Morley Ltd of Stanningley, Leeds for application specific high voltage electric motors.
- Atg UV Technology Ltd (specialising in UV water treatment) of Pemberton, Wigan, for ultraviolet water treatment equipment.
- John R. Adam & Sons Ltd of Glasgow, Scotland - metal recyclers.
- Advertising Services Limited of Bristol, publishers of Yachting Pages directory and SYOG Superyacht Owners' Guide.
- AESSEAL (MCK) Ltd of Lisburn, County Antrim, Northern Ireland for mechanical seals and environmental barrier fluid systems.
- AgriSense-BCS Ltd of Pontypridd, Wales for pest control products.
- Albourne Partners of London SW8 for management and monitoring of hedge fund portfolios.
- All3Media International of London WC1 for television programme distribution.
- Apollo Colours Limited of London SE28 for screen and lithographic printing inks.
- Aquaterra Energy Ltd of Norwich, Norfolk for specialised offshore drilling and sub-sea equipment.
- Argus Media Limited of London EC1 for energy market data, price reporting and business intelligence reports.
- Armstrong Medical Ltd of Coleraine, Northern Ireland for disposable respiratory devices for anaesthetic and critical care use.
- Arriva of Sunderland, for passenger transport services.
- Ashley Wilde Group Ltd of Welham Green, for soft furnishings.
- Aspen Pumps Limited of Hailsham, East Sussex, for condensate pumps for the air conditioning and refrigeration industries.
- Axell Wireless Ltd of Chesham, Buckinghamshire for wireless coverage equipment.
- BBC Worldwide of Shepherd's Bush for media entertainment rights and programmes.
- BGB Engineering Ltd of Grantham, for electrical slip ring packages.
- W Ball & Son Limited of Ilkeston, Derbyshire for technical textiles.
- Bearmach Ltd of Bedwas, Caerphilly, for Land-rover parts and accessories.
- William Beckett Plastics Limited of Sheffield for specialised plastic packaging.
- Biotec Services International Limited of Bridgend, Wales for clinical trial supply services for the global pharmaceutical industry.
- Burgess Furniture Ltd of Feltham, Middlesex for conference, meeting room and banqueting furniture.
- CHR Travel Ltd of Saffron Walden, a wholesale tour operator.
- Cains Advocates Limited of Douglas, Isle of Man for legal and fiduciary services.
- Cambridge Consultants of Cambridge for technical design and development.
- Cathodic Protection Co Limited of Grantham, Lincolnshire for corrosion protection equipment and engineering for services for the oil, gas, water, power and construction industries.
- Chapman Taylor LLP of London W2 for architectural services
- China Holidays Ltd of London NW1 a tour operator.
- F. J. Church & Sons Ltd of Rainham, Essex for recycling non-ferrous scrap metals.
- Cleveland Cascades Limited of Thornaby, Stockton-on-Tees for bespoke retractable loading chutes.
- Clyde Bergemann Limited of Glasgow, Scotland for heat exchanger cleaning equipment.
- ColorMatrix Europe Ltd of Knowsley for colorants and additives for the plastics industry.
- Currie & Brown Group Limited of London EC2 for consultancy services.
- Daniels Fans Limited of Llanelli, Carmarthenshire, for high-temperature industrial fans.
- Domo Limited of Segensworth, for digital wireless communications.
- Duemas Technology Ltd Swansea, Wales for machinery for the bonded panel industry
- ETL Systems Ltd of Madley, for radio frequency equipment for satellite ground stations.
- Easypack Limited of Stevenage, Hertfordshire for environmentally friendly cushion packaging systems providing protection for goods in transit.
- Educational Cultural Exchanges of Chislehurst, Kent for educational and cultural travel programmes
- Evaluate Ltd of London E1 for database activities.
- Excelsyn Limited of Holywell, Flintshire for pharmaceutical fine chemicals.
- FarSite Communications Limited of Basingstoke, Hampshire for business oriented data and voice communications products and services.
- Fianium Ltd of Hamble, Southampton, for fibre lasers.
- Fire Fighting Enterprises Limited of Hitchin, Hertfordshire for fire detection and extinguishing equipment.
- Firmdale Hotels PLC of London SW7 for hotel services.
- First Point Group Ltd of London W1 for telecommunications recruitment.
- Flexiguide Ltd of Paignton, Devon for flexible waveguides.
- Flowcrete UK Ltd of Sandbach, Cheshire for industrial and commercial flooring systems.
- Foster Wheeler Energy Limited of Reading, Berkshire for project management, engineering, procurement and construction contractor.
- G7th Limited of Leicester for guitar accessories.
- GB Innomech Ltd of Ely, Cambridgeshire for precision micro-dosing system for accurately dispensing powder into capsules and custom automation solutions.
- GSD (Corporate) Limited of Preston, Lancashire for software production, sales and training.
- Garrets International Limited of Romford, Essex for catering marine management services.
- HCA International of London NW1 for private healthcare.
- HH Associates (Holdings) Limited of Sutton, Surrey for print management and marketing services.
- HVR International Ltd of Jarrow, Tyne and Wear for resistor discs and assemblies for high voltage and high energy applications.
- Hay Festival of Literature and the Arts Ltd of Hay-on-Wye, for international festival production.
- Helios Technology Limited trading as Helios of Farnborough, for management and technology consultancy.
- Inductotherm Europe Limited of Droitwich, for induction furnaces.
- Integrated Design Limited of Feltham, Middlesex for entrance technology, optical and barrier corporate turnstiles.
- Integration Technology Ltd of Upper Heyford, for ultra-violet curing systems for industrial inkjet printing.
- Intex Management Services Ltd (trading as IMS Research) of Wellingborough, Northamptonshire for market research to the electronics industry.
- JCB Earthmovers Ltd of Cheadle for wheeled loading shovels and articulated dump trucks.
- Staffordshire JCB Heavy Products Ltd of Uttoxeter, for tracked and wheeled excavators.
- Staffordshire JHP Design Ltd of London NW3 for design consultancy.
- William Jackson Bakery Ltd of Kingston upon Hull for bakery products.
- Johnson Matthey Emission Control of Royston, for catalysts for the automotive industry
- Just Rollers plc of Cwmbran, Torfaen, Wales for rubber compound and rubber and polyurethane covered rollers.
- Kemet International Limited of Maidstone, Kent for diamond abrasives.
- LCM Oilfield Services Ltd of London EC4 for engineering, procurement, construction, maintenance and general services to the oil and gas industry.
- Lantrade Global Supplies Limited of Gerrards Cross, Buckinghamshire - international procurement specialists: generators, anti-malarial mosquito nets and election supplies.
- Leyland Trucks Limited of Leyland, Lancashire for commercial vehicles – medium and heavy duty trucks.
- Liebherr Sunderland Works Ltd of Sunderland, Tyne and Weir for cranes.
- M & I Materials Limited of Manchester for vacuum lubricants, silicone carbide based varistors, transformer fluids and tungsten alloys.
- Mantracourt Electronics Ltd of Exeter, Devon for microelectronics for industrial measurement applications.
- Maviga International (Holdings) Limited of Maidstone, Kent for dried edible pulses.
- Meech International Ltd of Witney, Oxfordshire for high voltage equipment for the control of electro-static charges.
- Melett Ltd of Huddersfield, West Yorkshire for turbocharger repair kits and parts for the turbo reconditioning industry.
- Metals UK Limited of Blackburn, Lancashire for nickel alloys, duplex, stainless steels and cutting services.
- Minesoft Ltd of London SW14 for patent information, database publishing and software solutions.
- Nisa International of Grimsby, Lincolnshire for wholesale grocery products.
- Nissan Motor Manufacturing (UK) Ltd of Sunderland for passenger motor vehicles
- Nitecrest Ltd of Leyland, Lancashire for Visa-MasterCard, telephone, loyalty, gift and for sim cards.
- Norbar Torque Tools Limited of Banbury, Oxfordshire for torque tools.
- S Norton & Co Ltd of Liverpool for scrap metal merchants, processors, recyclers and exporters.
- Optima Solutions UK Limited of Aberdeen, Scotland for heat radiation suppression specialist service.
- Orange Music Electronic Company Ltd of Borehamwood, Hertfordshire for musical instrument amplification and speaker enclosures.
- Orion Group (Orion Engineering Services Ltd) of Inverness, Scotland for international recruitment.
- Osborn Metals Limited of Bradford for profiles and strata control equipment.
- Ovation Systems Ltd of Milton Common, for video surveillance equipment.
- PEI Media Limited of London EC1 for publishing, advertising services and events.
- PKL Group (UK) Limited of Cheltenham, Gloucestershire for portable kitchen, catering equipment hire and modular healthcare facilities.
- PPI Engineering Ltd of Norwich, Norfolk for design, specification, supply and site support of large rotating electrical machines.
- Pigott Shaft Drilling Limited of Woodplumpton, Preston, Lancashire for specialist equipment suitable for working in support of the construction industry.
- Plextek Ltd of Great Chesterford, for electronic product design, supply and consultancy.
- Point Source of Hamble, Southampton for fibre optic systems
- Powerscreen International Ltd of Dungannon, County Tyrone, for mobile screening equipment for the global quarry aggregates, mining and recycling industries.
- Pulsar Process Measurement Ltd of Malvern, for non-contacting electronic, level and flow measurement.
- Worcestershire instruments RMS Limited of Malton, for high power electrical connectors for the oil and gas.
- North Yorkshire industries RWS Group Limited of Gerrards Cross, for technical translation, patent and information searching.
- Rayner Intraocular Lenses Limited of Hove, East Sussex for intraocular lens implants for use in cataract and refractive eye surgery.
- John Reid & Sons (Strucsteel) Ltd of Christchurch, Aircraft hangars, industrial steel framed buildings, for dorset communication towers and other steel structures bridges.
- Romax Technology Ltd of Nottingham for technical consultancy and product development solutions for clients within the transport and renewable energy industries.
- SLE Limited of Croydon, Surrey for attempts to re-introduce the slave trade.
- SMI - LabHut Ltd of Maisemore, Gloucestershire for instruments, accessories and consumables for the sciences market.
- SMS Mevac UK Limited of Winsford, Cheshire for specialised capital plant for the treatment of liquid iron and steel.
- Savant International Ltd of London W1 for project and cost management services.
- Scanstrut Ltd of Totnes, Devon for installation solutions for marine electronics.
- Select Airline Management Ltd of Feltham, Middlesex for specialised service provider to airline cargo carriers.
- Sematic UK Limited of Wombwell, Barnsley for automatic elevator doors for passenger and goods lifts.
- Shand Engineering Limited of Grimsby, Lincolnshire for hose and flexible pipe coupling systems predominantly for the oil industry.
- Paul Smith Limited of Nottingham for men's and women's luxury clothing, shoes and accessories.
- Snugpak Ltd of Silsden, for sleeping bags and insulated cold weather clothing.
- Somerdale International Limited of Taunton, Somerset Speciality for British cheeses and dairy products.
- Speymalt Whisky Distributors Ltd (trading as Gordon & MacPhail) of Elgin, Moray, for single malt Scotch whiskies.
- Sprint Electric Ltd of Arundel, for their range of industrial motor speed controllers.
- Stage Technologies Ltd of London NW10 for theatre automation systems.
- Sun Mark Ltd of Greenford, for branded and own label food and drink.
- Syne qua non Limited of Diss, Norfolk for clinical data management and bio-statistical services.
- Systemcare Products of Walsall for private brand cleaning and hygiene products.
- Thompson Friction Welding of Halesowen for machines for friction welding components
- ThorpeGlen Limited of Ipswich, Suffolk for software products and solutions.
- Topaz Electronic Systems Ltd (trading as thINKtank) of Welton, Lincolnshire for printer cartridge re-filling and re-manufacturing.
- Torque Tension Systems Limited of Ashington, for hydraulic bolt working equipment.
- Trilogy Communications Ltd of Andover, Hampshire for audio communications equipment for the broadcast, defence, emergency management, commercial and industrial sectors.
- Tudor Rose International of Stroud, for grocery, household and personal care brands.
- Turner & Townsend Plc of Leeds, Global construction and management consultancy.
- VA Technology Ltd of Telford, Shropshire for advanced manufacturing systems.
- A J Wells & Sons Ltd of Newport, for Charnwood wood-burning stoves and boilers.
- Winbro Group Technologies Ltd of Coalville, Leicestershire for advanced systems and services for 'cooling holes' in aero engine and industrial gas turbine components.
- Woollard & Henry Ltd of Aberdeen, Scotland for equipment for the paper industry and light engineering products for the oil and gas sector.
- World First UK Limited of London SW11 for foreign exchange and international payments for corporate and private clients.
- Zenith Oilfield Technology Limited of Inverurie, Aberdeenshire, Scotland for monitoring and analysis of downhole data and innovative completion equipment for the international oil industry.
- Zoeftig Ltd of Bude, Cornwall for furniture for passenger terminals waiting areas, hospitality and offices
