= Dibbern =

Dibbern is a German patronymic surname, originating from an Old Frisian and Low German personal name Dietbern. Notable people with the surname include:

- Adolph Dibbern (1825–1859), German actor and theatre director
- Caroline Dibbern (born 1974), German actress and director
- George Dibbern (1889–1962), German writer and yachtsman
- Günter Dibbern (born 1946), German business executive
- Karl Dibbern (1855–1919), German conductor, director, and composer
- Max Dibbern (1889–1972), German politician
- Rosa Dibbern (1830–1895), German actress and theatre director
- Simon Dibbern (born 1988), German actor
- Viggo Dibbern (1900–1982), Danish gymnast
