= Satellite Island =

Satellite Island may refer to:

- Satellite Island (Tasmania), Australia
- Satellite Island (Washington), USA
