= Pulsar Process Measurement Ltd =

- Industry: Measurement instruments
- Founded: 1997
- Headquarters: United Kingdom

Pulsar Process Measurement Ltd, now known as Pulsar Measurement since merging with Greyline Instruments, is a British company that manufactures measurement instrumentation products and assembles electronic products.

== History ==
The company was founded in 1997. On 1 April 2017 Pulsar merged with Electro Assembly Services Ltd, a sub-contract electro-mechanical manufacturer based in Essex. In 2019, Pulsar Process Measurement Ltd and Greyline Instruments merged and rebranded as Pulsar Measurement. Pulsar Measurement is a part of the TASI Flow portfolio.

== Description ==
Pulsar Measurement manufactures and supplies a range of instrumentation for non-contacting level, volume, open channel flow, pipe flow, sludge interface, and pump control to the Water / Wastewater, Food Production, and Process Automation industries. Pulsar also manufactures electro-mechanical components.

Pulsar Measurement has offices in Malvern, Worcestershire, Earls Colne, Essex., Largo, Florida, and Long Sault, Ontario. Pulsar Measurement also utilizes a network of independent distributors and partners to service various market segments.

== Awards ==
=== 2014 ===
- Institute of Water – National Innovation Award for ‘The Flow Pulse Clamp on Flow Meter’
- Chamber Business Awards Regional Winner (Herefordshire & Worcestershire) - Excellence in Innovation for Flow Pulse

=== 2013 ===
- Institute of Water - Innovation Awards Welsh Region - Technological Advances Award Winner (in association with Dwr Cymru Welsh Water) for ‘The Flow Pulse Clamp on Flow Meter’

=== 2011 ===
- Institute of Water - Innovation Awards Welsh Region - Product Winner for Quantum 2 pump station controller

=== 2009 ===
- Queen's Award for Enterprise - International Trade (Export)
