= Kemet International Limited =

Kemet International Ltd
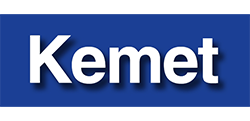
- Company type: Private Limited
- Industry: Manufacturing
- Founded: 1938
- Headquarters: Maidstone, Kent, United Kingdom
- Products: Lapping and polishing machines and consumables
- Revenue: £25M (30 September 2014)
- Number of employees: 125 (30 September 2015)
- Website: www.kemet.co.uk

Kemet International Limited, based in Maidstone, Kent UK, is involved with precision lapping and polishing technology using diamond media, composite lapping plates and precision lapping and polishing machines to produce polished finishes with close tolerances. In 1998 Kemet was Britain's largest supplier and manufacturer of diamond compounds and slurries.

Kemet has four divisions covering flat lapping and polishing, Tool and Die, Metallographic and Petrographic specimen preparation and Ultrasonic cleaning with aqueous media.

== History ==
The company was formed in September 1938, initially as an importer of equipment for the aircraft industry, which included precision machinery and small tools for the fabrication of ball bearing races for gyroscopes as well as woodworking machines to help manufacture the Mosquito fighter aircraft used in World War 2.

In 1953 manufacture started on a range of diamond abrasive pastes, which for the first time enabled precision components to be polished to a specified surface finish with guaranteed reproducible results. Developed in the first instance for use in the production of moulds and tools for the rapidly expanding plastics industry, as well as the precision polishing of hard materials and ceramics, diamond pastes now form just part of the Kemet product range.

In the early 1970s, a series of metal/resin composite lapping plates were developed which meant that for the first time a wide range of materials, including materials of different harnesses, could be flat lapped and polished to a higher specification than was previously achievable.

Shortly afterwards, a new division was set up to concentrate specifically on flat lapping using the technology of the Kemet composite plates. The result of this new venture was the introduction of a range of liquid diamond products and precision flat lapping machines developed for production lapping applications.

In February 1989, Kemet International obtained ISO 9001:2008 certification for the manufacture of diamond lapping and polishing products. This was extended soon afterwards to include Kemet composite lapping plates.

In 2009, Kemet International Limited won the Queens Award for Export. In 2014 Kemet International won the southern regional categories of the British Chambers of Commerce Awards 2014.

== Subsidiary companies ==
Kemet Europe was established in 1965 in the Netherlands, Kemet Australia in 1972, and Kemet Far East in Singapore in 1983. Kemet Far East obtained ISO 9001:2008 certification in July 2000.

The turnover of Kemet International and the subsidiary companies was £15.4m ($25m) in September 2014

Between 2002 -2008, Kemet International set up Kemet China as a sales company and entered into joint ventures to establish Kemet Japan and Kemet Korea.

== Services ==
Kemet offers training courses both in- house and on the customer’s premises covering all lapping and polishing activities. Kemet also offers a contract lapping service for customers who do not want to buy the equipment. Contract lapping is also covered under ISO 9001:2008

== Research and development ==
Kemet has set up dedicated research and development facilities in the UK to optimise customers’ processes for lapping and polishing application and to develop new products.

Recently new process developments facilities have been opened covering metallographic and petrographic sample preparation and ultrasonic cleaning with aqueous- based media.

In 2013 new R&D facilities were built in Singapore to cover high precision lapping and polishing process development for the electronics industry in SE Asia and China
