= Erich Andres =

German war photographer and journalist

Erich Andres (b. 1905 Leipzig, d. 1992 Hamburg) was an autodidact German war photographer and photojournalist.

== Biography ==
From 1921 to 1923, Andres was apprenticed to a typesetter in Dresden during which time he started to take photographs of landscapes, people, traditional costumes and folk customs with a home-made camera. In 1923 and unemployed he moved to Hamburg where he found work typesetting in a printery while freelancing as a photographer; his first sale was in 1927 of a cover image for Hamburger Anzeiger, then the Berliner Illustrierte Zeitung published his pictures of his travels in 1927/28 through southern Europe. In 1928/29 he also hiked through Yugoslavia, Greece and Italy.

In the Great Depression he again found himself without regular employment. His pictures of Hamburg's unemployed, of the workers' council meeting in Hamburg's trade union building, and workers' self-help were published in the Hamburger Echo and in Volk und Zeit, and in photo series entitled “Crisis” from November 1930 he pictured his own unemployment card.

Andres' conducted his first major photo reportage during the years 1931–2 in the multi-ethnic state of Albania, then coming increasingly under the influence of Mussolini. Andres' pictures show Albania at the time of King Ahmet Zogu, they expose its poverty and backwardness when on the surface the country had still a picturesque, nostalgic oriental flavour. Andres planned to publish the pictures as a book entitled People of Albania with publisher Reimar Hobbing, but the project was not realised, though as a result from 1932 he started working full-time as a photojournalist.

== National Socialist era ==
=== Berlin Olympics ===
Andres continued work as a photographer during the Nazi era and his officially-accredited documentation of the 1936 Berlin Olympics won him several awards. Eighty-five years later, the Olympic Committee itself referred to his imagery as blending "art, sport, aesthetics and technical mastery to capture immortal moments of winter sports action."

=== Spanish Civil War ===
In 1937, with permission of the Ministry of Propaganda, he documented the Spanish Civil War for the fascist insurgent side at the beginning of the conflict. He made two and a half thousand images during a journey that started in Paris, continued through different Spanish cities and towns, those of the peninsula and the Protectorate of Morocco, and ended in Lisbon. His photographic archive was acquired by the General Archive of the Civil War of Salamanca. Though he recorded republican prisoners-of-war at forced labour in the Toledo palace, his wide-ranging representations; landscapes, urban and rural, groups of combatants, troop movements, portraits, monuments, destruction of war and, especially, everyday scenes of the hardships of the general population during the civil war did not meet the Panglossian requirements of the Ministry.

=== Entartete Kunst ===
For the cover of a 1937 illustrated supplement to the Hamburger Anzeiger, Andres depicts two Bückeburg peasant women in traditional dress at the Nazi's Degenerate Art exhibition standing before Ludwig Kirchner's Expressionist sculpture of a naked couple. The caption reads "Bückeburg women before degenerate art. Kirchner's 'Couple', which one farmer's wife rejects with astonishment and the other with a smile, was bought in 1930 by a German art gallery for 3,000 marks." Andres' juxtaposition may have been deliberately ironic, given the newspaper's "spirit of resistance" in its treatment of propaganda.

=== Allied aerial bombardments ===
Andres was drafted into military service 1939 to 1945, undertaken in the naval propaganda corps. On home leave in June 1943, he married Hildegard Hänisch in Dresden where he photographed, against strict government prohibition, the destruction causing over 50,000 civilian deaths that resulted from the Allied aerial bombardment of Hamburg. The results were combined with writer Hans Erich Nossack's contemporaneous diary entries as the 1993 book Der Untergang.

== Post-war ==
Andres worked as freelancer after the war, living at Langenfelder Straße 60, Hamburg, and at first documented devastated Munich, its black market and the city's reconstruction and often used a ladder for an unusual perspective. Later he worked for Der Spiegel and the Hamburg daily newspapers. In April 1958 he photographed the Bewegung Kampf dem Atomtod protests against atomic weapons and later recorded the inauguration of the Hohe Weide Synagogue and the North Sea floods of 1962. From 1962 onwards he illustrated annual reports and calendars.

== Recognition ==
One of Andres' photographs, of girls in traditional costumes dancing a 'Ring o' Roses', was selected by Edward Steichen for the world-touring Museum of Modern Art exhibition The Family of Man, that was seen by 9 million visitors, and for its catalogue.

His photography of the destruction of Hamburg by Allied aerial bombardment provides a rare German perspective and has since been published in book form and exhibited. He was often consulted as an expert by museums seeking images of the history of Hamburg. In 1993 a re-edition of Hans-Erich Nossack's Der Untergang illustrated with Andres' photographs was sponsored by the Hamburger Abendblatt for the commemoration of the fiftieth anniversary of the firestorm.

Andres was interviewed by Heinrich Breloer and Horst Königstein for their award-winning 1982 television film The Axe of Wandsbek.

He died in Hamburg on 6 February 1992.

== Legacy ==
The Dresden City Museum holds his archive. Pictures with a reference to Hamburg are held in the Hamburg Office for the Protection of Monuments and additional copies in the picture archive of Prussian Cultural Heritage, Berlin. Since February 2019, the Cologne-based United Archives GmbH obtained exclusive rights to imagery not related to Hamburg and Dresden.

== Publications ==
- Nossack, Hans Erich, Andres, Erich (1993). Der Untergang Hamburg 1943 (in German). ISBN 978-3-8225-0236-5. OCLC 165500202.
- Andres, Erich, Orendt, Stefan (1992). Albanien [1931, 1957, 1990; ein Fotolesebuch (in German). ISBN 978-3-86163-031-9. OCLC 246656795.
- Andres, Erich, Zimmermann, Jan, Junius-Verlag (2018). Tod über Hamburg Fotos und Notizen aus dem "Feuersturm", 25. Juli bis 1. August 1943 (in German). ISBN 978-3-88506-835-8. OCLC 1083825121.
- Andres, Erich, Zimmermann, Jan, Beutler, Willi, Lüden, Walter, O'Swald-Ruperti, Ruperti, Scheerer, Theo, Schmidt-Luchs, Hugo, Schorer, Joseph, Junius-Verlag (2017). Hamburg - Krieg und Nachkrieg Fotografien 1939-1949 (in German). ISBN 978-3-88506-802-0. OCLC 990201787.
- Andres, Erich; Wisser, Horst (1998). Kindheit in Hamburg: in den 50er Jahren (in German). Gudensberg-Gleichen: Wartberg. ISBN 978-3-86134-479-7. OCLC 48119507.
- Andres, Erich, Gemeinnützige Wohnungs- und Siedlungsbaugenossenschaft "Süderelbe" (1972). 25 Jahre "Suüderelbe" 16. Sept. 1947-1972 (in German). Hamburg: Hammonia-Verl. OCLC 248709423.
- Zimmermann, Jan, Andres, Erich, Beutler, Willi, Lüden, Walter, Oswald-Ruperti, Ruperti, Scheerer, Theo, Schmidt-Luchs, Hugo, Schorer, Joseph, Junius-Verlag (2017). Hamburg Krieg und Nachkrieg (in German). ISBN 978-3-88506-802-0. OCLC 1073858921.

== Publications about ==
- Andres, Erich, Müller, Ulli (1994). Erich Andres, der Mann mit der Leiter 50 Jahre unterwegs mit dem Hamburger Fotoreporter (1920-1970) (in German). Hamburg: Dölling und Galitz. ISBN 978-3-926174-52-9. OCLC 845480996.
