= The Queen's Award for Enterprise: International Trade (Export) (2002) =

The Queen's Award for Enterprise: International Trade (Export) (2002) was awarded on 21 April 2002, by Queen Elizabeth II.

== Recipients ==
The following organisations were awarded this year.

- AES Engineering Ltd of Rotherham for Mechanical seals.
- Abbott Laboratories Ltd of Queenborough, Kent for Pharmaceuticals and healthcare products.
- Air Bearings Ltd of Poole, Dorset for Air bearing drilling spindles.
- Aircom International of Redhill, Surrey for Software tools, consultancy and training to the wireless telecoms industry worldwide.
- AirSense Technology Ltd of Hitchin, Hertfordshire for High sensitivity smoke detection equipment.
- Anglian Water International of Huntingdon, Cambridgeshire for Water, wastewater and environmental services.
- Argus Media of London N1 for Energy publication.
- ASTRAC Limited of Warwick for Business intelligence computer software.
- Avenue Data Systems Limited of Hull for Printed swing tickets and woven labels.
- Award (TP) International Limited of Cliftonville, Kent for Promotional merchandise and travel incentives.
- BAE SYSTEMS, Land Platform Communications of Blackburn, Lancashire for Digital intercom systems for high noise platforms.
- BAE SYSTEMS (Projects) Limited of Scotstoun, Glasgow, Scotland for Warships and associated technology, support and spares.
- BBC Worldwide of London W12 for Multiple-media distribution.
- BL-Pegson Ltd of Coalville, Leicestershire for Rock crushing plant and machinery.
- Bede Scientific Instruments Ltd of Durham for X-ray analytical equipment.
- Bosch Rexroth Limited of Glenrothes, Fife, Scotland for Low speed high torque hydraulic motors.
- Brett Harris Ltd t/a Snugpak of Silsden, West Yorkshire for Micro pack size sleeping bags and technical insulated outerwear.
- Brush Electrical Machines Ltd of Loughborough, Leicestershire for Air-cooled electrical turbo-generators.
- CFO Europe of London SW1 for Publishing and event organising.
- Calcarb Ltd of Bellshill, Lanarkshire, Scotland for Carbon bonded carbon fibre thermal insulation.
- Casterbridge Tours Ltd of Sherborne, Dorset for Tour Operator.
- Cementation Skanska of Doncaster for Specialist underground contractors.
- Centrax Ltd (TCD) of Newton Abbot, Devon for Gas turbine engine components.
- ClinPhone Group Limited of Nottingham for Telephone and web based services.
- Cognitive Drug Research Ltd of Reading, Berkshire for Specialist systems for assessing mental functioning in human clinical trials of new medicines.
- Cummins Engine Co Ltd, Daventry Engine Plant of Daventry, Northamptonshire for High horsepower diesel and gas engines.
- Cushman & Wakefield Healey & Baker of London W1 for Commercial property consultancy.
- DRS Data & Research Services plc of Milton Keynes for Document scanning products and services.
- Davis & Dann Limited of South Ruislip, Middlesex for Household goods, toiletries and chemists' sundries.
- EMI Records UK (EMIR) of London W6 for Licensing of recorded music.
- Eilers & Wheeler Sales Limited of London SE1 for Dairy products.
- EXi telecoms of Warrington, Cheshire for Telecoms implementation and support services.
- Farnell Electronic Components Ltd of Leeds for Electronic and industrial components.
- The Female Health Company (UK) PLC of London NW10 for Female condoms.
- Global Sealing Technologies of Flint, Wales for Engineered plastic films and laminates.
- Grafton Recruitment International Plc of Belfast, Northern Ireland for Recruitment agency.
- Group Lotus plc of Norwich, Norfolk for Car manufacture and engineering consultancy services.
- HIT Entertainment of London W1 for Children's TV programmes and characters.
- HLF Insurance Holdings Limited t/a The Heath Lambert Group of London EC3 for International insurance and reinsurance broking services.
- Hammersmith Medicines Research Ltd of London NW10 for Medicines research.
- Holset Engineering Company Limited of Huddersfield for Turbochargers and air handling systems for medium and heavy duty diesel engines.
- Hoya Lens U.K. Limited of Wrexham, Wales for Ophthalmic lenses.
- Humax Electronics Co. Ltd of Newtownards, County Down, for Northern Ireland Digital set top boxes.
- Intec Telecom Systems PLC of Woking, Surrey for Operations support systems software for telecommunications companies.
- Inverness Medical Limited of Inverness, Scotland for Blood glucose monitoring systems.
- ipTEST Limited of Guildford, Surrey for Test systems for power semiconductors.
- iSOFT Group Plc of Manchester for Software for patient information management systems.
- James Johnston & Co of Elgin Ltd of Elgin, Morayshire, Scotland for Cashmere and fine woollen goods.
- Kone Service Business Unit Bristol Factory of Bristol for Elevator and escalator control equipment and associated modernisation packages.
- LTV Copperweld Bimetallic UK Ltd of Telford, Shropshire for Copper-clad steel wire and strand.
- Lavenham Leisure Ltd of Long Melford, Suffolk for Horse rugs and quilted jackets.
- LIFFE (Holdings) plc of London EC4 for Derivatives exchange.
- Linklaters of London EC2 for Legal services.
- The Loop Communication Agency Ltd of Bristol for Corporate communications.
- Mabey and Johnson Limited of Reading, Berkshire for Prefabricated steel bridges.
- N. P. Mander Ltd t/a Mander Organs of London E2 for Building and restoration of traditional pipe organs.
- Markem Technologies Limited of Nottingham for Coding and marking equipment.
- Medieval Limited of Manchester for Pharmaceutical development and research services.
- MediSense UK Ltd of Abingdon, Oxfordshire for Medical diagnostics.
- MICE Group PLC of Arley, Coventry for Marketing support services.
- Multichem Ltd of Hexham, Northumberland for Whiteboard and highlighter inks for marker pens.
- Norbrook Laboratories Limited of Newry, County Down, for Northern Ireland Veterinary and human-use pharmaceuticals and animal health products.
- Nortel Networks - Monkstown of Newtownabbey, County for Antrim, Northern Ireland Networking and telecommunications equipment.
- Novocastra Laboratories Limited of Newcastle upon Tyne for Immunodiagnostic reagents.
- Panache Lingerie Ltd of Rotherham for Ladies' intimate apparel.
- Point Source Ltd of Southampton for Fibre optic systems.
- PolicyPlus International plc of Bath for Traded endowment policies.
- Richards Butler of London EC3 for Legal services.
- Rotran Simulator Logistics Ltd of Cardington, Bedfordshire for Flight simulator relocations and installations.
- SEOS Limited of Burgess Hill, West Sussex for Visual display systems for aircraft and other simulators, visualization and research.
- Schrader Electronics Limited of Antrim, Northern Ireland for Tyre pressure monitoring systems.
- Scientific Update of Mayfield, East Sussex for Scientific consultancy, conference and educational services.
- Herbert Smith of London EC2 for Legal services.
- Sophos PLC of Abingdon, Oxfordshire for Anti-virus software.
- Sterling International Movers Ltd of Northolt, Middlesex for Corporate relocation services.
- Strix Limited of Ronaldsway, Isle of Man for Components for the domestic appliance industry.
- Tellermate plc of Newport, Gwent, Wales for Electronic cash management systems for the retail and banking sectors.
- Theatre Projects Consultants International Limited of London NW5 for Theatre planning, design and equipment consultants.
- Tibbett & Britten Group PLC of Enfield, Middlesex for Supply chain management.
- Timsons Ltd of Kettering, Northamptonshire for Printing presses.
- Tocris Cookson Ltd of Avonmouth, Bristol for Chemicals for pharmacology and neurochemistry research.
- Victrex plc of Thornton Cleveleys, for Lancashire High performance engineering thermoplastics.
- A J Walter Aviation Limited of Partridge Green, West Sussex for Aircraft components.
- Warthog Plc of Cheadle, Greater Manchester for Computer and video games.
- The Sheeting Division of Wrapid Manufacturing Ltd of Bradford for Plastic labelling film.
