= Human Rights Act 1998 =

Act of the Parliament of the United Kingdom

Human Rights Act 1998 (Note: Section 22(1).)
- Act of Parliament
- Parliament of the United Kingdom
- Long title: An Act to give further effect to rights and freedoms guaranteed under the European Convention on Human Rights; to make provision with respect to holders of certain judicial offices who become judges of the European Court of Human Rights; and for connected purposes.
- Citation: 1998 c. 42
- Introduced by: Jack Straw, Home Secretary (Commons)
- Territorial extent: United Kingdom (Note: Section 22(6).)

Dates
- Royal assent: 9 November 1998
- Commencement: 9 November 1998 (sections 18, 20 and 21(5)); 24 November 1998 (section 19) (Note: The Human Rights Act 1998 (Commencement) Order 1998 (SI 1998/2882).); 2 October 2000 (rest of act) (Note: The Human Rights Act 1998 (Commencement No. 2) Order 2000 (SI 2000/1851).); (Note: Section 22(2)–(3).)
Other legislation
Amends	Capital Punishment Amendment Act 1868; Law Reform (Miscellaneous Provisions) (Scotland) Act 1940; Senior Courts Act 1981
Amended by	Scotland Act 1998 (Consequential Modifications) Order 2000; Human Rights Act (Amendment) Order 2001; Justice (Northern Ireland) Act 2002; Secretary of State for Constitutional Affairs Order 2003; Human Rights Act 1998 (Amendment) Order 2004; Constitutional Reform Act 2005; Mental Capacity Act 2005; Transfer of Functions (Lord Chancellor and Secretary of State) Order 2005; Human Rights Act 1998 (Amendment) Order 2005; Government of Wales Act 2006; Armed Forces Act 2006; Crime and Courts Act 2013; Public Service Pensions Act 2013; Human Rights Act 1998 (Remedial) Order 2020; Overseas Operations (Service Personnel and Veterans) Act 2021
Relates to	Human Rights Act 1998 (Amendment) Order 2004 (SI 2004/1574) (made under sub-s (4)); Safety of Rwanda (Asylum and Immigration) Act 2024

Status: Amended

Text of statute as originally enacted

Revised text of statute as amended

The Human Rights Act 1998 (c. 42) is an act of the Parliament of the United Kingdom which received royal assent on 9 November 1998, and came into force on 2 October 2000. Its aim was to incorporate into UK law the rights contained in the European Convention on Human Rights (ECHR). The act makes a remedy for breach of a Convention right available in UK courts, without the need to go to the European Court of Human Rights (ECtHR) in Strasbourg.

In particular the act makes it unlawful for any public body to act in a way which is incompatible with the convention, unless the wording of any other primary legislation provides no other choice. It also requires the judiciary (including tribunals) to take account of any decisions, judgment or opinion of the European Court of Human Rights, and to interpret legislation, as far as possible, in a way which is compatible with Convention rights.

However, if it is not possible to interpret an act of Parliament so as to make it compatible with the convention, the judges are not allowed to override the act of Parliament. All they can do is issue a declaration of incompatibility. This declaration does not affect the validity of the act of Parliament: in that way, the Human Rights Act seeks to maintain the principle of parliamentary sovereignty, pursuant to the Constitution of the United Kingdom. However, judges may strike down secondary legislation. Under the act, individuals retain the right to sue in the Strasbourg court.

== Background ==
The convention was drafted by the Council of Europe after World War II. Sir David Maxwell-Fyfe was the Chair of the Committee on Legal and Administrative Questions of the council's Consultative Assembly from 1949 to 1952, and oversaw the drafting of the European Convention on Human Rights. It was designed to incorporate a traditional civil liberties approach to securing "effective political democracy" from the strong traditions of freedom and liberty in the United Kingdom. As a founding member of the Council of Europe, the United Kingdom acceded to the European Convention on Human Rights in March 1951. However it was not until the 1960s that British citizens were able to bring claims in the European Court of Human Rights (ECtHR). During the 1980s, groups such as Charter 88, which invoked the 300th anniversary of the Glorious Revolution in 1688 and the Bill of Rights 1689, accused the executive of misusing its power and argued that a new British Bill of Rights was needed to secure human rights in the United Kingdom.

In its manifesto for the 1997 general election, the Labour Party pledged to incorporate the European Convention into domestic law. When the election resulted in a landslide Labour victory, the party, under the leadership of Tony Blair, fulfilled the pledge when parliament passed the Human Rights Act the following year.

The 1997 White Paper "Rights Brought Home" stated:

It takes on average five years to get an action into the European Court of Human Rights once all domestic remedies have been exhausted; and it costs an average of £30,000. Bringing these rights home will mean that the British people will be able to argue for their rights in the British courts – without this inordinate delay and cost.

Prior to the enactment of the Human Rights Act, individuals seeking to challenge public authority decisions on grounds such as discrimination had to rely on common law or specific statutes. In one case, Kelly Davis, a Black builder from Bath, brought a successful claim against the former Wansdyke District Council after being repeatedly denied planning permission between 1989 and 1991. In 2000, a judge at Bristol County Court found that the planning officers had acted in a “consistently unhelpful and obstructive fashion,” and concluded this treatment could only be explained by Davis being “the only Black builder in Wansdyke.” Wansdyke District Council was abolished in 1996, leaving its replacement, Bath and North East Somerset Council, to act as defendant in the case.

== Structure ==
The Human Rights Act places a duty on all courts and tribunals in the United Kingdom to interpret legislation so far as possible in a way compatible with the rights laid down in the European Convention on Human Rights (section 3(1)). If that is not possible, the court may issue a "declaration of incompatibility". The declaration does not invalidate the legislation but permits the amendment of the legislation by a special fast-track procedure under section 10 of the act. As of September 2006, 20 declarations had been made, of which six were overturned on appeal.

The Human Rights Act applies to all public bodies within the United Kingdom, including central government, local authorities, and bodies exercising public functions. However, it does not include Parliament when it is acting in its legislative capacities.

=== Section 3 ===
Section 3 is a particularly wide provision that requires courts to interpret both primary and subordinate legislation so that their provisions are compatible with the articles of the European Convention on Human Rights which are also part of the Human Rights Act. This interpretation goes far beyond normal statutory interpretation, and includes past and future legislation, therefore preventing the Human Rights Act from being impliedly repealed. Courts have applied this through three forms of interpretation: "reading in", inserting words where there are none in a statute; "reading out", where words are omitted from a statute; and "reading down", where a particular meaning is chosen to be in compliance. They do not interpret a statute so as to give it a meaning that would conflict with legislative intent, and courts have been reluctant in particular to "read out" provisions for this reason. If it is not possible to so interpret, they may issue a declaration of incompatibility under section 4.

Section 3 does not apply to the Illegal Migration Act 2023.

=== Sections 4 and 10 ===
Sections 4 and 10 allow courts to issue a declaration of incompatibility where it is impossible to use section 3 to interpret primary or subordinate legislation to be compatible with the articles of the European Convention on Human Rights, which are also part of the Human Rights Act. In these cases, interpretation to comply may conflict with legislative intent. It is considered a measure of last resort. A range of superior courts can issue a declaration of incompatibility.

A declaration of incompatibility is not binding on the parties to the proceedings in which it is made, nor can a declaration invalidate legislation. Section 4 therefore achieves its aim through political rather than legal means.

Section 10 gives a government minister the power to make a "remedial order" in response to either

- a declaration of incompatibility, from which there is no possibility of appeal, or
- a ruling of the European Court of Human Rights.

A remedial order may "make such amendments to the legislation as [the Minister] considers necessary to remove the incompatibility". Remedial orders do not require full legislative approval, but must be approved by resolutions of each House of Parliament. In especially urgent cases, Parliamentary approval may be retroactive.

Remedial orders may have retroactive effect, but no one may be guilty of a criminal offence solely as the result of the retroactive effect of a remedial order.

Section 10 has been used to make small adjustments to bring legislation into line with Convention rights although entirely new pieces of legislation are sometimes necessary.

As of December 2014, 29 declarations of incompatibility have been issued, of which:

- 8 have been struck down on appeal.
- 1 is pending appeal, as of December 2014.
- 16 have been remedied through the ordinary legislative process (including amendment or repeal of the offending legislation).
- 3 have been addressed through remedial orders.
- 1 has not been remedied.

The one case not to have been remedied, as of December 2014, is Smith v. Scott, concerning the right of serving prisoners to vote in the UK.

=== Sections 6 to 9 ===
Although the act, by its own terms, applies only to public bodies, it has had increasing influence on private law litigation between individual citizens leading some to state that it has a horizontal effect (as in disputes between citizens) as well as vertical effect (as in disputes between the state and citizens). This is because section 6(3) of the Human Rights Act defines courts and tribunals as public bodies. That means their judgments must comply with human rights obligations of the state, whether a dispute is between the state and citizens, or between citizens, except in cases of declarations of incompatibility. Therefore, judges have a duty to act in compatibility with the Convention even when an action is a private one between two citizens.

The way that public duty is exercised in private law was dealt with in a June 2016 decision McDonald v McDonald & Ors [2016] UKSC 28 (15 June 2016) where the UK Supreme Court firstly considered the question "... whether a court, when entertaining a claim for possession by a private sector owner against a residential occupier, should be required to consider the proportionality of evicting the occupier, in the light of section 6 of the Human Rights Act 1998 and article 8 of the European Convention on Human Rights"

The Supreme Court decided (paragraph 46) that "there are many cases where the court can be required to balance conflicting Convention rights of two parties, eg where a person is seeking to rely on her article 8 rights to restrain a newspaper from publishing an article which breaches her privacy, and where the newspaper relies on article 10. But such disputes arise not from contractual arrangements made between two private parties, but tortious or quasi-tortious relationships, where the legislature has expressly, impliedly or through inaction, left it to the courts to carry out the balancing exercise".

Therefore, In cases "where the parties are in a contractual relationship in respect of which the legislature has prescribed how their respective Convention rights are to be respected" then the Court decided, as set out in paragraph 59 "In these circumstances, while we accept that the Strasbourg court jurisprudence relied on by the appellant does provide some support for the notion that article 8 was engaged when Judge Corrie was asked to make an order for possession against her, there is no support for the proposition that the judge could be required to consider the proportionality of the order which he would have made under the provisions of the 1980 and 1988 Acts. Accordingly, for the reasons set out in paras 40–46 above, we would dismiss this appeal on the first issue."

Paragraph 40 supposed that "... it is not open to the tenant to contend that article 8 could justify a different order from that which is mandated by the contractual relationship between the parties, at least where, as here, there are legislative provisions which the democratically elected legislature has decided properly balance the competing interests of private sector landlords and residential tenants."

The duty of state judges to apply Convention rights to disputes between citizens is therefore about determining relationships between them, and applying domestic legislation accordingly. If the duty is carried out then it is likely there is Article 6 compliance.

Section 7 limits a right to bring proceedings under section 6 only to victims (or potential victims) of the unlawful act of the public authority.

Section 8 provides a right for a court to make any remedy they consider just and appropriate. A remedy under the act is therefore not limited to a Declaration of incompatibility possibly taking into account the equitable maxim Equity delights to do justice and not by halves.

Section 9 provides a right to challenge the compliance of judicial acts made by the UK, but only by exercising a right of appeal as set out by the Access to Justice Act 1999 (although not precluding a right to judicial review). For example, whether a judicial act properly applies legislation, or not.

=== Other sections ===
Section 8 says that UK judges can grant any remedy that is considered just and appropriate.

Section 19 requires a minister introducing a bill to parliament to make a statement of compatibility or, if unable to give such an assurance, a statement that the government wishes to proceed anyway. The statement is normally published with (immediately before) the text of the bill.

== Rights protected ==
Many rights established under the Human Rights Act 1998 were already protected under UK law, but the purpose of the act was largely to establish the European Convention on Human Rights in British law.

Section 21(5) of the act completely abolished the death penalty in the United Kingdom, effective on royal assent. The death penalty had already been abolished for all civilian offences, including murder (Murder (Abolition of Death Penalty) Act 1965) and treason (Crime and Disorder Act 1998), but remained in force for certain military offences (although these provisions had not been used for several decades).

This provision was not required by the European Convention (protocol 6 permits the death penalty in time of war; protocol 13, which prohibits the death penalty for all circumstances, did not then exist); rather, the government introduced it as a late amendment in response to parliamentary pressure.

The act provides that it is unlawful for a "public authority" to act in such a way as to contravene "Convention rights". For these purposes public authority includes any other person "whose functions are functions of a public nature". It also explicitly includes the courts. Convention rights includes only those rights specified in section 1 of the act (these are recited in full in Schedule 1). In the interpretation of those rights the act provides that the domestic Courts "may" take into account the jurisprudence of the European Court of Human Rights (ECtHR).

Section 7 enables any person with standing (as stipulated by Article 34 of the convention) to raise an action against a public authority that has acted or proposes to act in such a Convention-contravening manner. This is a more rigorous standard than is ordinarily applied to standing in English, although not Scottish, judicial review.

If it is held that the public authority has violated the claimant's Convention rights, then the court is empowered to "grant such relief or remedy, or make such order, within its powers as it considers just and appropriate". This can include an award of damages, although the act provides limitations on the court's capacity to make such an award.

However, the act also provides a defence for public authorities if their Convention-violating act is in pursuance of a mandatory obligation imposed upon them by primary legislation. The act envisages that this will ordinarily be a difficult standard to meet though since it requires the courts to read such legislation (and for that matter subordinate legislation) "So far as it is possible to do so ... in a way which is compatible with the Convention rights."

Where it is impossible to read primary legislation in a Convention compliant manner, the only sanction available to the courts is to make a declaration of incompatibility in respect of it. The power to do so is restricted to the higher courts. Such a declaration has no direct impact upon the continuing force of the legislation but it is likely to produce public pressure upon the government to remove the incompatibility. It also strengthens the case of a claimant armed with such a decision from the domestic courts in any subsequent appeal to ECtHR. In order to provide swift compliance with the convention the act allows ministers to take remedial action to amend even offending primary legislation via subordinate legislation.

== Notable human rights case law ==
- Lee Clegg's murder conviction gave rise to the first case invoking the act, brought by The Times in October 2000 which sought to overturn a libel ruling against the newspaper.
- Campbell v MGN Ltd [2002] EWCA Civ 1373: Naomi Campbell and Sara Cox both sought to assert their right to privacy under the act. Both cases were successful for the complainant (Campbell's on the second attempt; Cox's attempt was not judicially decided but an out of court settlement was reached before the issue could be tested in court) and an amendment to British law to incorporate a provision for privacy is expected to be introduced.
- Venables and Thompson v News Group Newspapers [2001] 1 All ER 908: The James Bulger murder case tested whether the Article 8 (privacy) rights of Venables and Thomson, the convicted murderers of Bulger, applied when four newspapers sought to publish their new identities and whereabouts, using their Article 10 rights of freedom of expression. The judge, Dame Elizabeth Butler-Sloss, granted permanent global injunctions ordering that the material not be published because of the disastrous consequences such disclosure might have for the former convicts, not least the possibility of physical harm or death (hence claims for Article 2 rights (right to life) were entertained, and sympathised with).
- A and Others v Secretary of State for the Home Department [2004] UKHL 56: On 16 December 2004, the House of Lords held that Part 4 of the Anti-terrorism, Crime and Security Act 2001, under whose powers a number of non-UK nationals were detained in Belmarsh Prison, was incompatible with the Human Rights Act. This precipitated the enactment of the Prevention of Terrorism Act 2005 to replace Part 4 of the 2001 Act.
- R v Chauhan and Hollingsworth: Amesh Chauhan and Dean Hollingsworth were photographed by a speed camera in 2000. As is standard practice for those caught in this way, they were sent a form by the police asking them to identify who was driving the vehicle at the time. They protested under the Human Rights Act, arguing that they could not be required to give evidence against themselves. An initial judgment, by Judge Peter Crawford at Birmingham Crown Court, ruled in their favour, but this was later reversed. The same issue came to light in Scotland with Procurator Fiscal v Brown [2000] UKPC D3, in which a woman, when apprehended on suspicion of theft of a bottle of gin, was drunk and was asked by police to identify who had been driving her car (which was nearby) at the time she arrived at the superstore.
- Price v Leeds City Council [2005] EWCA (Civ) 289: On 16 March 2005 the Court of Appeal upheld a High Court ruling that Leeds City Council could not infringe the right to a home of a Romani family, the Maloneys, by evicting them from public land. The court however referred the case to the House of Lords as this decision conflicted with a ruling from the European Court of Human Rights (ECtHR).
- An NHS Trust v MB: In March 2006, the High Court in London ruled against a hospital's bid to turn off the ventilator that kept the child, known as Baby MB, alive. The 19-month-old baby had the genetic condition spinal muscular atrophy, which leads to almost total paralysis. The parents of the child fought for his right to life, while doctors argued that the invasive ventilation is likely to be uncomfortable.
- Connors v UK: A judgment given by ECtHR declared that Travellers who had their licences to live on local authority-owned land suddenly revoked had been discriminated against, in comparison to the treatment of mobile-home owners who did not belong to the traveller population, and thus their Article 14 (protection from discrimination) and Article 8 (right to respect for the home) rights had been infringed. However, there has never been a case where the act has been successfully invoked to allow travellers to remain on greenbelt land, and indeed the prospects of this ever happening seem highly unlikely after the House of Lords decision in Kay v Lambeth LBC which severely restricted the occasions on which Article 8 may be invoked to protect someone from eviction in the absence of some legal right over the land.
- 2006 Afghan hijackers case: In May 2006, a politically controversial decision regarding the treatment of nine Afghan men who hijacked a plane to flee from the Taliban caused widespread condemnation by many tabloid newspapers (most notably The Sun), the broadsheets and the leaders of both the Labour Party and the Conservative Party. It was ruled by an Immigration Tribunal, under the Human Rights Act, that the hijackers could remain in the United Kingdom; a subsequent court decision ruled that the government had abused its power in restricting the hijackers' right to work.
- Mosley v News Group Newspapers Limited (2008), Max Mosley challenged an invasion of his private life after the News of the World exposed his involvement in a sadomasochistic sex act. The case resulted in Mr Mosley being awarded £60,000 in damages.

== Criticism ==
=== Excessive rights ===
During the campaign for the 2005 parliamentary elections the Conservatives under Michael Howard declared their intention to "overhaul or scrap" the Human Rights Act:

The time had come to liberate the nation from the avalanche of political correctness, costly litigation, feeble justice, and culture of compensation running riot in Britain today and warning that the politically correct regime ushered in by Labour's enthusiastic adoption of human rights legislation has turned the age-old principle of fairness on its head.

The schoolboy arsonist allowed back into the classroom because enforcing discipline apparently denied his right to education; the convicted rapist given £4000 compensation because his second appeal was delayed; the burglar given taxpayers' money to sue the man whose house he broke into; travellers who thumb their nose at the law allowed to stay on green belt sites they have occupied in defiance of planning laws.

The schoolboy referred to was speculatively suing for compensation and was a university student at the time of the court case. Whilst the initial claim was unsuccessful, on appeal the applicant was awarded damages.

=== Judicial powers ===
Constitutional critics since the Human Rights Bill was tabled at parliament claimed it would result in the unelected judiciary making substantive judgments about government policies and "mass-legislating" in their amendments to the common law resulting in a usurpation of Parliament's legislative supremacy and an expansion of the UK courts' justiciability. A leading case of R (on the application of Daly) v Secretary of State for the Home Department highlights how the new proportionality test borrowed from ECtHR jurisprudence has allowed a greater scrutiny of the substantive merits of decisions of public bodies, meaning that actions against such bodies, judicial reviews, are more of an appeal than a traditional judicial review.

They stress the overriding interpretative obligation of courts under section 3(1) of the Human Rights Act to read primary legislation as Convention-compliant, so far as is possible, is not dependent upon the presence of ambiguity in legislation. Section 3(1) could require the court to depart from the unambiguous meaning that legislation would otherwise bear subject to the constraint that this modified interpretation must be one "possible" interpretation of the legislation. Paul Craig argues that this results in the courts adopting linguistically strained interpretations instead of issuing declarations of incompatibility.

=== Journalistic freedom ===
In 2008, Paul Dacre (as editor of the Daily Mail) criticised the Human Rights Act for allowing, in effect, a right to privacy at English law despite the fact that Parliament has not passed such legislation. He was referring to the indirect horizontal effect of the Human Rights Act on the doctrine of breach of confidence which has moved English law closer towards a common law right to privacy. In response, the Lord Chancellor, Lord Falconer stated that the Human Rights Act had been passed by Parliament, that people's private lives needed protection and that the judge in the case had interpreted relevant authorities correctly.

=== Immigration ===
The Human Rights Act 1998 has faced significant criticism from politicians and media commentators who argue that it makes it difficult to control illegal migration and deport foreign criminals. Critics say that the act benefits the undeserving at the expense of society as a whole, including criminals seeking to evade punishment or foreign terrorists wishing to avoid deportation. From around 2003 onwards, critics increasingly focused on court decisions like Chahal v UK that made it harder to deport foreign terrorism suspects. A human rights appeal invoking Article 8 of the European Convention is the most common way of challenging deportation.

=== Inadequacy ===
In contrast, some have argued that the Human Rights Act does not give adequate protection to rights because of the ability for the government to derogate from Convention rights under article 15. Recent cases such as R (ProLife Alliance) v BBC [2002] EWCA Civ 297 have been decided in reference to common law rights rather than statutory rights. Where there is no clear precedent in the common law, judges remain accused of judicial activism.

=== Terrorism-related complaints ===
Some politicians in the two largest parties, including some ministers, have criticised the Human Rights Act as to the willingness of the judiciary to make declarations on incompatibility against terrorism legislation. Baron Reid argued that the act was hampering the fight against global terrorism in regard to controversial control orders:

There is a very serious threat – and I am the first to admit that the means we have of fighting it are so inadequate that we are fighting with one arm tied behind our backs. So I hope when we bring forward proposals in the next few weeks that we will have a little less party politics and a little more support for national security.

== Consideration of replacement ==
In 2007, Howard's successor as Leader of the Opposition, David Cameron, vowed to repeal the Human Rights Act if he was elected, instead replacing it with a Bill of Rights for Britain. The human rights organisation JUSTICE released a discussion paper entitled A Bill of Rights for Britain?, examining the case for updating the Human Rights Act with an entrenched bill.

Following the 2010 general election, the Conservative–Liberal Democrat coalition agreement said that the Human Rights Act would be investigated.

In 2011, following controversial rulings from both the European Court of Human Rights (ECtHR) and the Supreme Court of the United Kingdom, David Cameron suggested a "British Bill of Rights". The government commission set up to investigate the case for a Bill of Rights had a split of opinion.

Judge Dean Spielmann, the President of ECtHR, warned in 2013 that the United Kingdom could not withdraw from the Convention on Human Rights without jeopardising its membership of the European Union. It has also been claimed that, since the Good Friday Agreement (which ended the sectarian terrorist violence of the Troubles) is founded on the convention, it would be breached by any withdrawal.

In 2014, the Conservative Party planned to repeal the act and replace it with a "British Bill of Rights".

Following the 2015 election win for the Conservative Party, Michael Gove, the Secretary of State for Justice, was charged with implementing the reforms which were previously blocked by the Liberal Democrats in the coalition government. The Conservative Party manifesto said that the new bill will "break the formal link between British Courts and the European Court of Human Rights". As before 1998, claims relying on ECtHR jurisprudence which conflicted with the "British Bill of Rights" would have to go to a court in Strasbourg rather than being able to be heard in the UK. Given devolution settlements, it was feasible that any new Bill of Rights may require agreement from devolved legislatures.

However, the Conservatives' manifesto from the general election in 2017 pledged to retain the Human Rights Act "while the process of Brexit is underway".

A potential replacement, the Bill of Rights Bill 2022, was drafted on 22 June 2022 but scrapped on 27 June 2023. As of 2024, the Labour Party supports continuing to be a member of the ECHR.

Supporters of act outline a number of potential issues, if replacing it occurred, such as hindering the power of citizens to uphold their human rights and undermining the Good Friday Agreement.

== See also ==
- Human rights in the United Kingdom
- Joint Committee on Human Rights
- Declaration of incompatibility
- Parliamentary supremacy
- Presumption of guilt
- Presumption of innocence
