= Hamburger Anzeiger =

German daily newspaper from 1922 to 1957

The Hamburger Anzeiger (English: "Hamburg Gazette"), in circulation 1922–1957, was a daily newspaper for Hamburg and its neighbouring cities, which were incorporated in 1939.

== Foundation ==
The Hamburger Anzeiger was created in August 1922 through merger of the Neue Hamburger Zeitung with the General-Anzeiger for Hamburg-Altona, both of which belonged to the Essen publisher Wilhelm Girardet. Both newspapers sought non-partisan positions and were left-liberal. The General Gazette had an audience mainly of industrial workers while the Neue Hamburger Zeitung appealed more to bourgeois readers.

During the second half of the 1920s and before World War II, the Hamburger Anzeiger was the city's highest circulation newspaper, with 150,000 readers.

The Hamburger Anzeiger favoured the German Democrats, and in September 1930, in July 1932, and again in November 1932, presented very clearly its support for the German State Party (DStP). In the presidential election it was very much in favour of Hindenburg. Long-time editor-in-chief was Curt Platen, a liberal politician, and when he was elected senator, political editor Dr. Alois Winbauer was elected on 1 July 1929 his successor. Like Platen, Winbauer was a member of the German Democratic Party and its successor, the German State Party. He leaned towards the conservative wing around the senators Carl Petersen and Walter Matthaei, who saw himself primarily as representing the interests of the bourgeoisie and sought to merge with the right-wing liberal German People's Party (DVP) and smaller parties in order to maintain political stability and ward off National Socialism. Winbauer consistently represented this line, deviating from the more left-liberal course of the Hamburg DDP state association, which was inclined toward the SPD but critical of Adolf Hitler and the NSDAP in his editorials.

== Under National Socialism ==
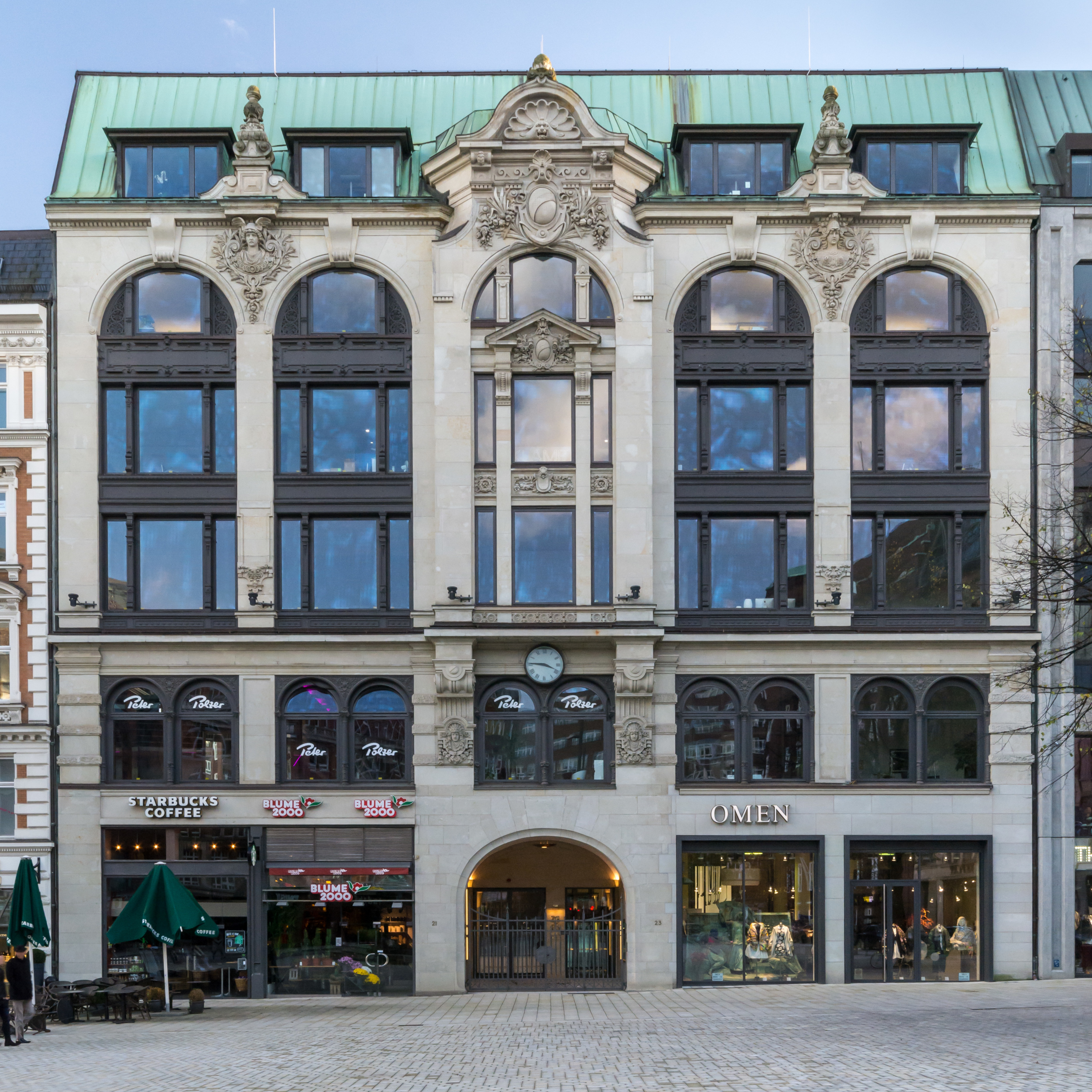
The Girardet Press House on the Gänsemarkt which housed the editorial offices of the Hamburger Anzeiger

On January 7, 1932, at a mass meeting of the NSDAP Joseph Goebbels spoke to an audience of around 10,000 in the largest hall in the city. Normally, the impressive number of visitors would have made it a newsworthy political event, but there was no mention of it in the left-liberal Hamburger Anzeiger, the social-democratic Echo nor in the communist Volkzeitung. The Hamburger Nachrichten and the National Socialist Tageblatt, by contrast, enthusiastically made it front page news. The Fremdenblatt in a conspicuous effort to maintain neutrality gave Goebbels short articles in the morning as well as in the evening editions.

As late as January 30, 1933, the Anzeiger pronounced Hitler's appointment as Reich Chancellor "an enormous danger to the peace of our people, to the existence of our state [...] of the rights of the democratic constitution and its safeguards, not to mention the freedom of the nation"; a day later, editor-in-chief Alois Winbauer admitted Hitler demonstrated statesmanlike skills as possible incumbent, but at the same time he dubbed the NSDAP a "dictatorship party".

Conscious of its large circulation in Hamburg, the National Socialists aimed to intimidate the Hamburger Anzeiger as a voice of the liberal bourgeoisie. During the election campaign for the upcoming Reichstag election of 5 March 1933, the Girardet Press House on the Gänsemarkt was raided by the Sturmabteilung brownshirts on the 27 February (the day of the burning of the Reichstag), and on 5 March was attacked and besieged. The SA was looking for Windauer personally, but he was able to escape undetected.

After the election, NSDAP Gauleiter Karl Kaufmann took aggressive action against the newspaper and Winbauer on the pretext of an article that reported on a leaflet; ostensibly to acquaint readers with an example of foreign atrocity propaganda, the Hamburger Anzeiger printed in full the text of the pamphlet allegedly from Czechoslovakia, in which the 'Third Reich' was described as a brutal dictatorship. It hit the mark: the Germany of the NSDAP was portrayed as "one big dungeon, a graveyard of the spirit". A brief editorial commentary appended to the article ironically condemned the text as rhetorical hyperbole and as a distortion that was a "gross sin against the truth". Following the rules of the NSDAP the Hamburger Nachrichten also printed the leaflet, but commented on it with a longer passage that railed against social democracy because the printed text allegedly came from the social democratic party in Czechoslovakia, and called for the Reich government to take "hostages" from among the German social democrats and the Marxist flood of dirt against Germany." The Anzeiger was banned for 14 days, then 'hamonised'; police authorities lifted the ban on 20 April 1933, twenty days after the first decree, only when the publisher issued a statement that it would take “measures to reorganize the editorial management in agreement with the local NSDAP"

Winbauer was dismissed. He was replaced by the previous editor-in-chief of the regional Nazi Party newspaper Hamburger Tageblatt, Hans Jacobi who had ridiculed Winbauer as "the father of all democracy". Without involvement of publisher Giradet, Kaufmann authorised the new editor-in-chief to "carry out the necessary personnel changes in the editorial staff", which largely stripped the editor and publisher Justus Hendel of his own power. Hendel made impotent protest by not appearing in his office for months.

As his first official act, Jacobi made the declaration that under his leadership the Hamburger Anzeiger would put itself unreservedly in the service of the Reich and Hamburg government". He published articles echoing government propaganda, such as that justifying the persecution of homosexual men carried out from July 1936 during the Berlin Summer Olympics by Criminal Police Commissioner Gerhard Günther Kanthack, with the newspaper soon parroting the notion that;

"The new Germany has no use for criminals and weaklings, perverts and inverts, but requires instead straightforward and sincere manly souls, and so we must combat homosexuality with the means available to us; education, observation, the law, the police, and the courts."

Hugo Sieker in a retrospective essay in 1958 and later in his 1973 Cultural work in the spirit of resistance recalls that the supplement of the newspaper, initially under Wolf Schramm, and from 1939 under his own direction, operated a "spirit of resistance"; writing between the lines, they promoted artists such as Ernst Barlach and Friedrich Wield, had the Jewish writer Harry Reuss-Löwenstein write contributions, first under his real name, then under a pseudonym, and also under aliases, Sieker's teachers Adolf Jensen and Wilhelm Lamszus. Their subtle balancing act between adaptation and resistance continued until from 1 September 1944 Hamburger Anzeiger was merged with the Hamburger Fremdenblatt and the National Socialist Hamburger Tageblatt to form the Hamburger Zeitung.

Ostensibly due to war economies, decreased advertising causing financial insecurity despite growing sales, and the increasing shortage of paper, finally offered the Nazis a good pretext to strangle the liberal newspapers and make their survival impossible. The Hamburger Tageblatt most benefited from the changed situation.

== Post-war and demise ==
After the end of the war, Winbauer became editor-in-chief of the Hamburger Freie Presse (HFP), which appeared until 1949 with British license No. 21, employing Sieker and other former journalists, and from September 1952 was published with the title Hamburger Anzeiger,[18] under conservative editor-in-chief, earlier a foreign correspondent, Hans-Georg von Studnitz 1953-5.[19] It folded in 1957.

== Significant contributors ==
- Erich Andres, photographer
- Max Behrens, journalist and editor
- Manfred Delling, journalist
- George Dibbern, German-born writer
- Erich Klabunde, editor
- Erich Lüth, editor
- Bernhard Meyer-Marwitz, freelancer from 1936
- Ursula Roeh
- Arthur Rundt
- Herman George Scheffauer, German-American journalist
- Hugo Sieker, German journalist, writer and publicist
- Hans Georg von Studnitz, journalist and anti-Semite
- Hilde Weber, illustrator, cartoonist
