= Deon du Plessis =

South African publisher (1952 - 2011)

- Born: Deon Jean du Plessis; 1952; South Africa
- Died: 11 September 2011; Houghton, Johannesburg, South Africa
- Citizenship: South African
- Occupation: Journalist • Publisher
- Years active: 1970s until his death in 2011
- Known for: Founder of Daily Sun
- Title: Publisher
- Spouse: Vanessa du Plessis
- Children: Daniella du Plessis

Deon Jean du Plessis was a veteran South African journalist who founded the Daily Sun newspaper in July 2002, serving as its publisher until his sudden death at the age of 59 in 2011 from acute bronchitis.

Deon du Plessis' journalism career began in the 1970s with the Argus Publishing Group, owners of The Star, which became the Independent Media Group in 1994. Before becoming a journalist, the young du Plessis first served as a military trainee with the South African government in Namibia. As a journalist he covered the political squabbles and wars between freedom fighters and the colonial governments of Mozambique and Angola while a foreign correspondent for Argus Africa news service across the 1970s and 1980s. Max du Preez first met du Plessis in Angola in 1978 while they both covered the Angolan War for their respective media houses. Du Plessis then became the deputy editor of Argus News, Sowetan and Sunday Tribune. He was then appointed the editor of Pretoria News afterwards and was later made the managing director of all of Independent Media Group's Gauteng newspapers.

== Daily Sun ==
Deon du Plessis founded South Africa's largest tabloid, the Daily Sun in July 2002. While in management at the Independent News & Media, du Plessis proposed to the company the idea of a tabloid that would focus on the working class African reader in the township. He called his envisioned reader the 'man in the blue overalls', referring to the working black class. The Independent Media rejected Du Plessis' business plan and he resigned and went to propose the idea to Media24 executives who bought in the idea. Du Plessis and Media24's first Daily Sun copy was published on 1 July 2002, with the front-page heading 'On Top of the World', about Brazil's 2002 World Cup victory. He served as the publisher of the paper and Themba 'TK' Khumalo as its editor-in-chief. He was nicknamed the 'Great White Hyena by peers in the media industry.'

Within five years, the paper proved to be a major success in the press industry, hitting high sales in a short space of time. By 2004, daily sales reached 300,000, and reaching 2.3 million people, and was said to be the widest read daily newspaper in sub-Saharan Africa. Du Plessis when he spoke to journalist Gill Moodie in September 2010 said it actually took four years for Daily Sun to be a profitable and successful business and "that's pretty fast actually as far as newspapers go". His other brainchild was the Sunday Sun and Nova, both of which are now defunct. Du Plessis owned 20% of the company Daily Sun (Pty) Ltd and Media24 owned the 80%

== Death ==
Du Plessis suddenly died on 11 September 2011 from acute bronchitis at the age of 59 in his home in Houghton, Johannesburg, just as he was about to take three months' sabbatical. His leave was starting on Monday 12 September 2011 until January 2012. The South African government described his career as "illustrious" and said he would always be remembered for his "outstanding contributions" in South Africa's press industry. It said in a statement: "As the founder of the Daily Sun, Deon du Plessis ensured that many more South Africans were able to have access to news and entertainment, and that contributed significantly to changing the newspaper landscape in the country". News24, a Media24 online newspaper, broke the story of Deon du Plessis' death with the heading 'Respected newsman Deon du Plessis dies' on 11 September 2011. The next day, 12 September, the Daily Sun ran a front-page slip titled, 'Deon du Plessis is dead!'. The newspaper's editor-in-chief Themba Khumalo described du Plessis as a "consummate journalist and a taskmaster of note" whose death left a "huge void" at Daily Sun and the press industry at large while Media24 stated that it was difficult to imagine the Daily Sun without him. "His death is devastating for us all," one of Media24's executives, Fergus Sampson, said of his death

In an obituary published on Biz Community and Daily Maverick, journalist Mandy de Waal described Du Plessis as a "larger than life" figure in South African journalism and credited him with transforming the Daily Sun into the country’s highest-selling daily newspaper.

== External references ==
- Kanthan Pillay, The most engaging raconteur I ever met, Thought leader, 15 September 2011.
- J.D. Froneman, J.D. 2006. In Search of the Daily Sun's Recipe for Success. Communitas, vol. 11.ISSN 1023-0556
- H. Wasserman, H. 2008. ATTACK OF THE KILLER NEWSPAPERS! The ‘tabloid revolution’ in South Africa and the future of newspapers. Op 2 September 2008 aanlyn gepubliseer. Bladsye 786-797
