= Erich Lüth =

German writer and film director

- Born: February 1, 1902; Hamburg, German Empire
- Died: April 1, 1989 (aged 87); Hamburg, West Germany
- Occupations: Writer, film director, editor, politician
- Years active: 1923–1964
- Political party: German Democratic Party (DDP) (until 1930), Radical Democratic Party (RDP) (1930), Social Democratic Party (SPD) (from 1946)
- Awards: Mayor Stolten Medal (1984)

Erich Lüth (February 1, 1902 – April 1, 1989) was a German writer and film director born in Hamburg.

== Career ==
Lüth began his career in 1923 as an intern in the editorial staff of the Hamburger Ullstein Verlag Berlin his education. Subsequently, he was editor of the Hamburger Anzeiger and chairman of the Hamburg Young Democrats. In 1928 he was the German Democratic Party (DDP) member of the Hamburg Parliament. In addition, Lüth was a member of the German Peace Society and was active in his party's pacifist wing and fell within the Young Democrats and the DDP on the basis of a call for military service in 1929. In spring 1930 Lüth left the DDP and in the same year joined the inaugural Radical Democratic Party (RDP). From 1933 to 1935 Lüth managed a trade association.

In 1943, Lüth was drafted as a soldier and was captured, becoming a prisoner of war in Italy. During his imprisonment, he was editor of the POW camp newspaper, "Lagerpost von Ghedi" until his release in 1946. He joined the SPD and became Director of the National Press Office in Hamburg until 1953 and then again from 1957 until his retirement in 1964.

From 1953 to 1957, Lüth was head of the Press Division of the German Theatre Association. He was the founder and chairman of the Press club in Hamburg, co-founded the Society of Friends of Franco-German Intellectual Relations, and also the initiator of the Peace with Israel, which merged with the Society for Christian-Jewish Cooperation in autumn 1952.

Lüth is the author of numerous books on Israel and participated in peace talks between West Germany and Israel in Jerusalem, Haifa and Tel Aviv. In 1984 he was awarded the Mayor Stolten Medal by the Hamburg Senate.

== Veit Harlan vs Lüth case ==
His name is known today mainly in connection with a legal case from 1950, whose background lies in Lüth's boycott against the film Immortal Beloved, based on the novel Aquis submersus by Theodor Storm. In 1951, Veit Harlan sued for an injunction against Lüth for publicly calling for a boycott of Unsterbliche Geliebte (Immortal Beloved). The District Court in Hamburg granted Harlan's suit and ordered that Lüth forbear from making such public appeals. However, the lower court decision was ultimately overturned in 1958 by the Federal Constitutional Court because it infringed on Lüth's right to freedom of expression. This was a landmark decision because it clarified the importance of the constitutional civil rights in disputes between individuals.
