= Éric de Bisschop =

French seafarer

- Born: October 21, 1891; Aire-sur-la-Lys
- Died: August 30, 1958 (aged 66)
- Known for: Navigation, Adventure books
- Scientific career
- Fields: Ethnography; Adventure

Éric de Bisschop (October 21, 1891 – August 30, 1958) was a French seafarer, famous for his travel from Honolulu to France aboard the Polynesian sailboat Kaimiloa.

He spent most of his adult life in the Pacific Ocean, notably in Honolulu (1935–1937 and 1941–1947) and in French Polynesia (1947–1956); he was not simply a sea adventurer but had a deep interest in the Pacific and its inhabitants, whose history he tried to study.

== Biography ==
=== Early life ===
He was born in Aire-sur-la-Lys (Pas-de-Calais). Trained in a Jesuite secondary school then as a sailor, he commanded a patrol boat in the English Channel in 1914–1915, then was transferred to the air force and sustained a serious plane accident (1917).

=== China and the Fou Po ===
After the War, he went to China in 1927. There in 1931 he met the man who was to be his teammate for the seven next years – Joseph Tatibouet.

He built a Chinese junk, the Fou Po and from 1932 to 1935 sailed with Tatibouet in the southwestern Pacific Ocean. Fou Po was destroyed in a hurricane on Formosa (modern day Taiwan), but de Bisschop quickly built a new, smaller junk, Fou Po II in 1933. In July 1935, they were detained for two weeks by the Japanese in Jaluit (Marshall Islands) under suspicion of being spies and barely escaped, fleeing towards the Hawaiian Islands. On October 25, they reached, half starving, Molokai Island and were rescued at the Kalaupapa hospital. On the 27th, the Fou Po II was destroyed by a storm, along with all the scientific work done during these years of seafaring. After a while, they flew to Honolulu.

=== Hawaii and the Kaimiloa ===
During the year 1936, they built a Polynesian "double canoe" (a catamaran, but Eric de Bisschop always refused to use this word); he met a Hawaiian woman, Constance Constable, alias "Papaleaiaina", whom he married at the end of 1938.

In March 1937 he and Tatibouet left Honolulu aboard the Kaimiloa, reaching Cape Town in September, Tanger in December, and after a long stay Cannes in May 1938. In 1939, he published his book Kaimiloa, which was translated in English in 1940.

=== France (1938-40) ===
During their stay in France, the de Bisschops frequently met Maréchal Pétain, notably in Pétain's estate in Villeneuve-Loubet on the Côte d'Azur.

A notable episode was the hearing by Eric de Bisschop concerning Amelia Earhart, whom he had heard about while he was detained in Jaluit.

=== The Kaimiloa-Wakea and Hawaii ===
Eric de Bisschop then built a new boat, the Kaimiloa-Wakea, and on June 14, 1940, left Bordeaux with his wife, towards the Marquesas Islands. But the boat was destroyed in a collision in the port of Las Palmas de Gran Canaria. Financially helped by Pétain (since June 16, 1940 the chief of the Government, then of the State), they waited for judgment of the case; in April 1941, Eric de Bisschop was appointed as Consular Agent in Honolulu, the office being vacant since Professor Pecker had resigned in September 1940. They traveled through the US and reached Hawaii at the beginning of August 1941.

The couple lived in Constance's parents' house, which was ipso facto the place of the Consular Agency. They had some activity as Pétain propagandists (conferences, articles in the Honolulu Star-Bulletin), but on December 13, a few days after the Pearl Harbor attack, Eric de Bisschop was deprived of his diplomatic recognition by the State Department without explanation. In May 1942, the Constables' house was even thoroughly searched by Military Intelligence and the four people questioned; Eric de Bisschop was kept under arrest for three days. It seems that they had been denounced for imaginary crimes. In 1942 Constance de Bisschop wrote two letters to Sumner Welles to defend her husband. But the revocation had not been cancelled when on November 8 happened the diplomatic rupture between the US and the Vichy Government.

=== French Polynesia and the Tahiti-Nui ===
In 1956, he committed himself in a new "odyssey", a project he had had for some years: he built a Polynesian raft in order to cross the eastern Pacific Ocean from Tahiti to Chile (contrary to Thor Heyerdahl's crossing); the Tahiti-Nui left Papeete with a crew of five on November 8, 1956. He had recruited two experienced sailors from Tahiti for this challenge: Michel and Alain Brun. When near the Juan Fernández Islands (Chile) in May 1957, the raft was in a very poor state and they asked for a tow, but it was damaged during the operation and had to be abandoned, although they were able to keep all the equipment aboard.

=== Chile, the second Tahiti-Nui and the death ===
In Chile a second Tahiti-Nui was built in Constitucion; they left on April 13, 1958 towards Callao, then towards the Marquesas, but they missed their target and were swept along towards Cook Islands where on August 30 the raft went aground and was wrecked at Rakahanga atoll.

Eric de Bisschop was the only person who died in this accident. He was buried in the island of Rurutu where he had had his house since 1951.

== Bibliography ==
Books by Eric de Bisschop

- The Voyage of the Kaimiloa, London, 1940 (translated from French: Kaimiloa : D'Honolulu à Cannes par l'Australie et Le Cap, à bord d'une double pirogue polynésienne), Editions Plon, Paris, 1939 (Au delà des horizons lointains 1).
- Tahiti-Nui, New-York, 1959 (translated from French: Cap à l'Est : Première expédition du Tahiti-Nui, Paris, Plon, 1958)
- Vers Nousantara, ou l'énigme polynésienne, Editions La Table Ronde, Paris, 1963 (Collection L'ordre du jour).

Other sources

- François de Pierrefeu : Les Confessions de Tatibouet, Editions Plon, Paris, 1939 (Au delà des horizons lointains 2) [about the Fou Po]
- Bengt Danielsson: From Raft to Raft, 1961 (translated from Swedish) [about the Tahiti-Nui II]
- Honolulu Star-Bulletin, 3, 4, 5 September 1941 : "Honolulu Girl Defends Petain As True Patriot", by Baroness Constance de Bisschop.
- Honolulu Star-Bulletin, October 25, 1941, "UNFAIR TO MARSHAL PETAIN" (about a radiophonic commentary).
- Honolulu Advertiser, August 8, 1942, "OUR APOLOGIES EXTENDED, CONSTANCE" (about an editorial of the newspaper).
- Honolulu Advertiser, September 7, 1942, "AN ANSWER TO YOURS FOR JUSTICE" (about a letter published in the newspaper under the signature Yours For Justice).
