= Horizontal effect =

In law, horizontal effect refers to the ability of legal requirements meant to apply only to public bodies to affect private rights. It arises where a court dealing with a legal dispute between purely private entities interprets a legal provision to be consistent with certain legal norms in such a way as to affect the legal rights and obligations of the parties before it.

== Examples ==
In European Union law under the doctrine of direct effect, national courts are under a legal duty to interpret national laws to be consistent with EU laws which the member state concerned has either not implemented or not implemented correctly. The ability of such interpretations to affect the legal rights and duties of purely private entities is called horizontal direct effect. Normally, direct effect is only vertical, in that it is meant to apply to the state and its emanations (i.e., to public sector employers).

In the United Kingdom, in Campbell v Mirror Group Newspapers, the House of Lords found that while the Human Rights Act 1998 cannot create new causes of action between individuals, "if there is a relevant cause of action, the court as a public authority must act compatibly with both parties' Convention rights."

== See also ==
- Human Rights Act 1998
- Direct effect
- Vertical effect

== Further reading and external links ==
- J. Morgan, ‘Privacy in the House of Lords, Again’ (2004) 120 Law Quarterly Review 563.
- An explanation of the term from yourrights.org
