= Vertical effect =

Vertical effect refers to, in English law, the way in which the Human Rights Act impacts on the relationship between individual citizens and the state. The Human Rights Act states that the Act applies to public bodies meaning that any citizens satisfying the test for standing can fight a case based upon a breach of a Convention right.

In recent times there has been some debate as to whether the Human Rights Act can also have horizontal effect as well.
