= Aksia =

American investment advisory firm

Aksia LLC
- Company type: Private
- Industry: Financial services
- Founded: October 2006; 19 years ago
- Founder: Jim Vos
- Headquarters: 599 Lexington Avenue, New York City, U.S.
- Key people: Jim Vos (CEO)
- Products: Private credit; Risk management; Real estate; Private equity; Infrastructure
- Total assets: US$300 billion (under advisement ) (2023)
- Number of employees: 460 (2024)
- Website: www.aksia.com

Aksia is an American alternative investment management and advisory firm headquartered in New York City. The company provides alternative investments to institutional investors.

Aksia's main offices outside the U.S. are in London and Tokyo.

== Background ==
Aksia was founded in October 2006 by Jim Vos who was previously Head of the Fund of funds group at Credit Suisse and five other former executives from the same bank.

The firm first became notable for advising clients to not invest with the feeder funds of Madoff Investment Securities before the Madoff investment scandal was unveiled as a ponzi scheme in late 2008. In a report written in August 2007, Aksia stated that Madoff Investment Securities had numerous red flags. Initially Aksia noted that its split-strike conversion strategy could not be replicated by other firms in producing the returns and that the firm became big because it didn't charge fees but instead made money on trading commissions. After speaking with Madoff Investment Securities traders and Bernard Madoff himself, Aksia learnt that the balance sheet for proprietary trading at the firm was not big enough to pay for the returns of the feeder funds. In addition the proprietary trading business was barely profitable and family members who worked at the firm was secretive. Aksia also hired a private investigator to look into the auditing firm working for Madoff Investment Securities, Friehling & Horowitz. When Aksia tried to call the accountants, one hung up immediately while the other was a 78-year-old man living in Florida. As a result, in its report Aksia said Madoff's fund was not audited and stated four possible scenarios from Madoff's work being completely above board to it being a fraud.

Despite the large demand from institutional investors for advice, there were only a select handful of specialists who could fulfill such needs. Due to Aksia's increased reputation for thorough due diligence and research, its employees were high sought after with some being poached by rival firms which raised concerns about Aksia's turnover. Compared to its older peers, Aksia had only been in the business for several years. In January 2010, Aksia sued two former employees for $40 million. Aksia claimed the two took confidential and proprietary information from it to their new firm, Albourne Partners. It also claimed they contacted Aksia clients and told them to move their business to Albourne. In March 2010, Aksia amended the lawsuit to increase the scope to include Albourne and its executives. In June 2010, Aksia and Albourne agreed to a settlement one day before the trial began.

In January 2020, Aksia announced that it would acquire TorreyCove Capital Partners, a San Diego–based advisory firm specializing in private equity and real assets. In October 2020, Aksia announced it would acquire Alignium LLC, a Chicago-based consulting firm specializing in real estate. Aksia has stated both acquisitions were done to increase its asset class coverage and that it would take steps to address any potential conflicts of interest.

On April 8, 2020, Aksia send out a letter to its clients stating that they should not take advantage of the Paycheck Protection Program (PPP). It stated PPP loans should not be going to alternative asset managers whose management fees are not significantly impacted by the COVID-19 pandemic. Managers who take advantage of the program would show not just poor moral judgment and hurt the reputation of the industry but also crowd out struggling workers and businesses severely impacted by COVID-19.

== Notable cases ==
In October 2014, Aksia downgraded its rating on then-hedge fund BlueCrest Capital Management to uninvestable and advised its clients to pull out their money due to a lack of transparency. This came after BlueCrest received attention in the media earlier in the year due to Albourne Partners downgrading it stating it had not provided sufficient information on its proprietary trading fund, BlueCrest Staff Managed Account (BSMA) would could have conflict of interest issues. In December 2020, the U.S. Securities and Exchange Commission announced that BlueCrest had agreed to pay $170 million to settle charges arising from inadequate disclosures, material misstatements, and misleading omissions concerning its transfer of top traders from its flagship client fund, BlueCrest Capital International (BCI) to BSMA and replacement of those traders with an underperforming algorithm.

In October 2020, Aksia urged its clients not to provide any more money to Apollo Global Management amid lingering question over co-founder Leon Black’s relationship with Jeffrey Epstein. It stated it was prudent to delay any new commitments until the investigation of the relationship by Dechert was completed and if there was indeed a relationship, investors that recently committed new capital an Apollo fund could be subject to intense scrutiny. In January 2021, Dechert released a report stating that Black had paid Epstein $158 million for financial advice from 2012 through 2017 which lead to Black resigning from his position as Apollo's CEO a few months later.

In October 2023 Aksia rescinded its approval for Brookfield Corporation's special situations fund after two top executives left.
