= FarSite Communications Limited =

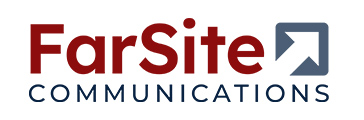
- Type: Private
- Industry: Telecommunication
- Founded: 1998
- Headquarters: Basingstoke, United Kingdom
- Website: www.farsite.com

FarSite Communications Limited is a privately owned designer, developer and manufacturer of communications and smart city products. FarSite was founded in 1998 and has headquarters in Basingstoke, United Kingdom. FarSite was founded by a team of people formerly working for Racal Datacom Limited and The Software Forge Limited.

FarSite products are available globally, both directly and through a network of local distributors and resellers. FarSite also provide development services to other companies needing communications or systems level development expertise.

== Products ==
FarSite Communications' products include the following:

- FarSync PCI, PCIe and PCMCIA cards
- Bit Error Rate Testers - USB & PCIe
- FarSync Flex USB communications device
- FarLinX Gateway appliances
- Communications software products
- netBin Container Fill Level Monitoring System
- nLok Container Access Control Solution
- Liquinet Liquid Level Monitoring Solution

Various communications protocols are supported by the PC-based communications cards on both Linux and Windows operating systems, including

- X.25
- PPP - Point-to-Point Protocol
- Cisco HDLC
- Frame Relay
- HDLC
- Bitstreaming for Digital Audio Broadcasting and VOIP

The Communications Gateways provide TCP to X.25 and X.25 to XOT interworking.

== Awards ==
In 2009, FarSite Communications Limited was awarded the Queen's Award for Enterprise, the United Kingdom's most prestigious award for business performance.
