= Albourne Partners =

British investment advisory firm

Albourne Partners Limited
- Company type: Private
- Industry: Financial services
- Founded: March 7, 1994; 32 years ago
- Founders: Simon Ruddick; Guy Ingram; Sam Lewis
- Headquarters: London, United Kingdom
- Key people: Simon Ruddick (Chairman); John Claisse (CEO)
- Products: Private credit; Hedge funds; Real estate; Private equity; Infrastructure
- Total assets: US$700 billion (under advisement ) (2023)
- Number of employees: ~600 (2023)
- Website: albourne.com

Albourne Partners (Albourne) is a British alternative investment advisory firm headquartered in London. The company provides alternative investment solutions to institutional investors.

Albourne has additional offices in Europe, North America and Asia.

== Background ==
=== Business overview ===
Simon Ruddick was a derivatives trader for Japanese investment banks who eventually left in 1989 to start up his own equity derivatives firm Westminster Equity which was then sold in 1994. Then in March that year, Ruddick founded Albourne Partners with Guy Ingram and Sam Lewis. The firm was originally set up in an office behind a butcher shop in the village of Albourne, West Sussex before moving to London later. Albourne was set to provide consultancy services to hedge funds by assessing the risk of their portfolios. According to Ruddick, the idea came from his friend Bill Fung, an academic at the London Business School that was sought after by investors in advising them to build their hedge fund portfolios. Originally Albourne worked on helping Fung with his clients but after Fung moved on to do something different, the firm decided to take on its own clients.

Albourne has a fixed fee model where a standard subscription fee is charged each year for clients who wish to access its research reports on hedge funds and other alternative investment firms. This is done to keep the firm's objectivity as fees that charge in basis points will give the firm incentive to keep recommending products to clients to invest in even if they are not needed. In addition Albourne does not take discretion for the advice given to clients on what to invest in. It also does not negotiate fees on behalf of its clients. Albourne was able to break into the US market because its peers stated they would only carry out due diligence for big investors if the fund provided capacity for their discretionary clients while Albourne did not do this.

Unlike its peers which only focused on open funds that clients could put money into, Albourne researched funds that were already hard-closed or raising assets. This helped during the 2008 financial crisis, where all funds opened and Albourne could allocate money to funds that were previously closed to investors.

Albourne has been a vocal component of hedge fund regulation. It has called for hedge funds to have proper governance with regards to its board of directors, have proper details in their prospectus instead of using boilerplate text and to provide performance targets in standard format. Albourne has also stated common hedge fund structures had bad practices which included arbitrary powers to force investors out of a fund or suspend withdrawals, and the ability to give secret fee discounts to investors. When the Standards Board for Alternative Investments was being set up, Albourne wrote to the group stating that additional standards were needed to mitigate risk. In autumn 2010, Albourne became a core supporter of the Standards Board for Alternative Investments.

In 2015, Ruddick who had served as the firm's CEO stepped back from his position and was succeeded by John Claisse. Ruddick would remain as the chairman of Albourne's board of directors.

In October 2016, Albourne called for an overhaul of hedge fund fees and stated it would announce a plan to help investors determine appropriate fees. Ruddick has stated fee negotiations often take place between an investor and a fund behind closed doors making the process opaque. As a result, Albourne was in favour of a plan in which incentive fees are charged when the returns have exceeded the minimum hurdle rates based on benchmarks.

In April 2019, Albourne made it mandatory for hedge funds to answer questions on ESG initiatives when it performs operational due diligence.

=== Notable cases ===
In February 1998, Albourne released a report to stating it was heavily bearish on fixed income arbitrage. A few months later, Long-Term Capital Management collapsed after its saw the value of its trades drop 50% as a result of Russian currency devaluations and a flight to US treasuries.

In late 1998, Albourne released a report stating that investors should avoid Madoff Investment Securities. While initially criticized by its peers, eventually Albourne was vindicated after the Madoff investment scandal was exposed in 2008.

In February 2014, Albourne released a report downgrading BlueCrest Capital Management stating it had not provided sufficient information on its proprietary trading fund, BlueCrest Staff Managed Account (BSMA) would could have conflict of interest issues. In December 2020, the U.S. Securities and Exchange Commission announced that BlueCrest had agreed to pay $170 million to settle charges arising from inadequate disclosures, material misstatements, and misleading omissions concerning its transfer of top traders from its flagship client fund, BlueCrest Capital International (BCI) to BSMA and replacement of those traders with an underperforming algorithm.

=== Royal endorsement ===
Albourne was a recipient of the Queen's Award for Enterprise: International Trade 2006. It also won the award in 2009.

== Event hosting ==
Albourne hosted the networking event Hedgestock on 7–8 June 2006 at Knebworth House in Hertfordshire. The name was a play on the name Woodstock, a music festival. At the time it was the largest networking event for the hedge fund community with over 4,000 attendees from various related industries. The entrance fee was £500 per person. The Who were noted to have played at Hedgestock for two hours. Albourne also hosted other conferences such as Escape to Alphatraz in 2008 which took place at Alcatraz Island and Hedgegate in 2010 which took place in Washington on the same day as the 2010 United States elections.

== Albourne Village ==
In late 2000s, Albourne launched the website, Albourne Village which describes the village where the firm was originally based at and got its name from. Albourne had a launch party for the website on the banks of the River Thames with The Wurzels performing for guests.

Albourne Village is a social media platform that allows people in the hedge fund and related industries to browse job listings, find new research, and network. The layout of the website is of an old village, with a town pub and school, among other buildings. Co-founder Sam Lewis is the mayor of the village and is portrayed wearing Mayoral Robes. The website has kept the same design for almost 20 years although it was announced in 2020 that it would be getting updated. At the time when the internet was still in its infancy, the website was considered revolutionary as it created virtual community for hedge fund employees and had 25,000 members in 2005. However its usefulness has declined in recent years as there are newer platforms that can provide similar services such as LinkedIn, Bloomberg Terminals and Symphony Communication. Despite this, the websites still has dedicated users from the highest end of the industry remaining on it. In 2023, Albourne Village states its membership is over 100,000.

== Lawsuits ==
In January 2010, Aksia sued two former employees for $40 million. Aksia claimed the two took confidential and proprietary information from it to the new firm they were joining, Albourne. It also claimed they contacted Aksia clients and told them to move their business to Albourne. In March 2010, Aksia amended the lawsuit to increase the scope to include Albourne and its executives . In June 2010, Aksia and Albourne agreed to a settlement one day before the trial began.
