= Stocksee =

- Municipality
- Coat of arms

- Location of Stocksee within Segeberg district
- Interactive map of Stocksee
- Location within Germany Location within Schleswig-Holstein
- Coordinates: 54°5′N 10°21′E
- Country: Germany
- State: Schleswig-Holstein
- District: Segeberg
- Municipal assoc.: Bornhöved

Government
  - Mayor: Dierk Jansen

Area
  - Total: 11.38 km^{2} (4.39 sq mi)
- Elevation: 38 m (125 ft)

Population (2025-12-31)
  - Total: 390
  - Density: 34/km^{2} (89/sq mi)
- Time zone: UTC+01:00 (CET)
  - Summer (DST): UTC+02:00 (CEST)
- Postal codes: 24326
- Dialling codes: 04526, 04555
- Vehicle registration: SE
- Website: www.stocksee.de

Stocksee is a municipality in the district of Segeberg, in Schleswig-Holstein, Germany. Stocksee is located at a lake of the same name.
