= Argus Media =

Global commodity markets information provider

Argus
- Type: Private
- Industry: Commodities, Energy
- Founded: 1970
- Founder: Jan Nasmyth
- Headquarters: London, United Kingdom
- Area served: Worldwide
- Products: Price assessments, market data, analytics, news, conferences
- Number of employees: 1,500
- Website: www.argusmedia.com

Argus (formerly known as Petroleum Argus Ltd) is a privately held provider of energy and commodities information, headquartered in London. The company publishes daily price assessments in physical commodity markets.

== Overview ==
Argus is a privately held UK-registered company which publishes news, price assessments, data, analytics and consulting services of international energy and other commodity markets. It also offers conferences.

Argus was the first price-reporting agency to apply the IOSCO Principles for Oil Price Reporting Agencies in 2013, and subsequently roll them out to cover the other energy and commodity markets it covers. Argus retains the services of a leading accounting firm to undertake an annual independent assurance review to verify adherence to the Principles.

Argus was owned by the family of its founder Jan Nasmyth and its senior staff, but in September 2016 a majority-stake was sold to the equity firm General Atlantic valuing the company at $1.4 billion. The company’s ownership structure was updated in 2024 when Chairman and Chief Executive, Adrian Binks became majority owner and General Atlantic consolidated its stake

Argus's headquarters are in London, with major offices in Houston, Dubai, Singapore, Paris, Seoul, Amsterdam, Hamburg, Riga, Kyiv, Astana, Calgary, San Francisco, Mexico City, Washington DC, Pittsburgh, New York, São Paulo, Tokyo, Shanghai, Beijing, Mumbai, Sydney, Granada, Brussels, Lagos, and Cape Town.

Prices assessed by Argus for energy, fertilizer, metals, chemicals and agriculture markets are widely used as benchmarks to settle futures contracts and as indexes for short or long term physical supply contracts.

== History ==
Argus was established in 1970 by former Daily Telegraph journalist Jan Nasmyth. In 1985, the company opened offices in Singapore and Houston. It began covering European gas and power markets in 1995, and added coal and biofuels in the early 2000s.

The company has acquired numerous companies across commodity markets over its history:

| Year | Company | Market |
|---|---|---|
| 2011 | FMB Consultants | Fertilizers |
| 2012 | DeWitt & Co | US petrochemicals |
| 2012 | Fundalytics | European power and gas |
| 2013 | TABrewer Consulting | Petrochemicals |
| 2013 | Jim Jordan & Associates | Petrochemicals |
| 2015 | MetalPrices.com | Speciality metals and rare earths |
| 2018 | Integer Research | Market intelligence and conferences |
| 2019 | O.M.R. | German oil reporting |
| 2020 | Agritel | French agricultural intelligence |
| 2021 | Oleochem Analytics | Renewable chemicals |
| 2022 | Pipe Logix | US pipe and tube market |
| 2023 | Mercaris | US organic and non-GMO commodities |

== Awards ==
Argus won the Queen's Award for Enterprise: International Trade (Export) in the UK in 2002, 2009 and 2015.
