= Satellite Island (Tasmania) =

Island in Tasmania, Australia

Satellite Island (Wayaree)
- Location within Tasmania

Geography
- Coordinates: 43°19′S 147°13′E

Administration
- Australia
- State: Tasmania

Satellite Island (Nuenonne: Wayaree) is a small island, part of the Partridge Island Group, lying close to the south-eastern coast of Tasmania, in the D'Entrecasteaux Channel between Bruny Island and the Tasmanian mainland. It is surrounded by an ancient fossil clad rock shelf, home to an array of local shellfish, including crayfish, native scallops, abalone and oysters. It was once used as an observatory for the night sky.

Satellite Island has a variety of native bird life including a resident pair of rare white-breasted sea eagles and the red breasted robin. The island is encircled by a variety of native scrub and trees including ancient blue gums and some introduced species.

The Island is privately owned and can be hired for exclusive use. It was ranked #2 by Harper's Bazaar UK on their list of the world's best private islands.
