= Drittwirkung =

Legal concept

Drittwirkung is a legal concept originally developed in German courts that presumes that an individual plaintiff can rely on a national bill of rights to sue another individual or the government for the violation of those rights.

It was originally developed in the 1950s, but has gained traction in various other national legal systems in Europe as well as the jurisprudence of the European Court of Human Rights, in the case of X and Y v. The Netherlands.

The corollary of the concept in the context of the European Court and Convention of Human Rights is that a government can be held responsible for failing to prevent, through judicial or law enforcement methods, the violation of a person's human rights by another person or private, non-state actor.

Drittwirkung is further subdivided into mittelbare and unmittelbare Drittwirkung. "The former means that the values and principles surrounding constitutional fundamental rights are to be considered by the courts when they are deciding private law cases. The latter means that the rights themselves can be directly applied against private bodies by the courts."

This concept does not seem to exist in U.S. jurisprudence.
