= 2014 Birthday Honours =

Awards of British honours

The 2014 Birthday Honours were appointments by some of the 16 Commonwealth realms of Queen Elizabeth II to various orders and honours to reward and highlight good works by citizens of those countries. The Birthday Honours are awarded as part of the Queen's Official Birthday celebrations during the month of June. The Queen's Birthday Honours were announced on 14 June 2014 in the United Kingdom, on 9 June 2014 in Australia, on 2 June 2014 in New Zealand, on 14 June 2014 in Grenada, Papua New Guinea, Solomon Islands, Tuvalu, Saint Lucia and Belize.

The recipients of honours are displayed as they were styled before their new honour and arranged by the country (in order of precedence) whose ministers advised The Queen on the appointments, then by honour with grades i.e. Knight/Dame Grand Cross, Knight/Dame Commander etc. and then divisions i.e. Civil, Diplomatic and Military as appropriate.

== United Kingdom ==
The 2014 Queen's Birthday Honours list was published on 14 June 2014 by The London Gazette.

=== Member of the Order of the Companions of Honour (CH) ===
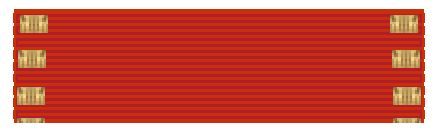
Order of the Companions of Honour ribbon

- Dame Margaret Natalie Cross Smith, DBE, Actress. For services to Drama.

=== Knight Bachelor ===
Knight Bachelor ribbon

- Dr Charles Richard Bean – Deputy Governor for Monetary Policy, Bank of England
- Professor Colin Blakemore, FRS FMedSci – Director, Centre for the Study of the Senses, School of Advanced Study, University of London
- Ewan Brown, CBE – Chairman, Scottish Financial Enterprise and Senior Governor, University of St Andrews
- Andrew Nicholas Carter, OBE – Headteacher, South Farnham Community Junior School, Surrey
- William Nigel Paul Cash, MP – Member of Parliament for Stone
- Professor Cary Cooper, CBE AcSS – Distinguished Professor of Organisational Psychology and Health, Lancaster University
- Barry Stuart Day, OBE – Chief Executive, Greenwood Dale Foundation Trust and The Greenwood Academies Trust
- Daniel Day-Lewis – Actor. For services to Drama.
- Michael Deegan, CBE – Chief Executive, Central Manchester University Hospitals NHS Foundation Trust
- Professor Thomas Martin Devine, OBE FBA FRSE HonMRIA FRHistS FSA Scot – Personal Senior Research Chair of History, The University of Edinburgh
- Philip Graham Dilley – Chairman, Arup Group
- Dr Michael Dixon – Director, Natural History Museum, London
- Dr John Ernest Dunford, OBE
- Professor David Stephen Eastwood, DL FRHistS – Vice-Chancellor, University of Birmingham
- Professor David Royden Fish – managing director, University College London Partners, Academic Health Science Partnership
- Robert Anthony Francis, QC – Chairman, Mid Staffordshire NHS Foundation Trust Public Inquiry
- Professor David Greenaway, DL – Vice-Chancellor, University of Nottingham
- Gerald Edgar Grimstone – Chairman, Standard Life
- Professor Tom Kibble, CBE FRS – Senior Research Fellow and Emeritus Professor of Theoretical Physics, Imperial College London
- Jonathan Michael Murphy, QPM – Chief Constable, Merseyside Police
- Derek John Myers – Lately Chief Executive, Royal Borough of Kensington and Chelsea and London Borough of Hammersmith and Fulham
- Professor Michael John Owen – Director, The MRC Centre for Neuropsychiatric Genetics and Genomics, Cardiff University
- Professor John Bernard Pethica, FRS – Chief Scientific Adviser, National Physical Laboratory and Physical Secretary and Vice-President, The Royal Society
- András Schiff – Pianist
- Dr Anthony Seldon, FRSA FRHistS FKC – Headteacher, Wellington College, Berkshire
- The Rt Hon. Nicholas Soames, MP – Member of Parliament for Mid Sussex
- Professor Richard Sorabji, CBE FBA – Honorary Fellow, Wolfson College, Oxford and Professor Emeritus, King's College London
- Professor David Spiegelhalter, OBE FRS – Winton Professor of the Public Understanding of Risk, University of Cambridge
- Professor Tejinder Virdee, FRS – Professor of Physics at Imperial College London

=== The Most Honourable Order of the Bath ===
Order of the Bath ribbon

==== Knight/Dame Commander of the Order of the Bath (KCB/DCB) ====
Civil

- Jilian Matheson – National Statistician and Permanent Secretary, Office for National Statistics and Chief Executive, UK Statistics Authority
- Amyas Morse – Comptroller and Auditor General, National Audit Office

Military

- Vice Admiral Philip Jones, CB

==== Companion of the Order of the Bath (CB) ====
Civil

- Susan Ruth Elizabeth Atkins – Service Complaints Commissioner for the Armed Forces
- Dr Michael William Patrick Cavendish – Director-General, Implementation Group, Cabinet Office
- Peter Clayton – Ministry of Defence
- Claire Johnston – Director, Legal Adviser's Office, Department for Education
- Christopher Jon Martin – Principal Private Secretary, Prime Minister's Office
- Michael Spurr – Director-General and chief executive officer, National Offender Management Service
- Simon James Virley – Director-General, Markets and Infrastructure Group, Department of Energy and Climate Change
- Rhodri Havard Walters – Lately Reading Clerk, House of Lords

Military

- Major General Kevin David Abraham, late Royal Regiment of Artillery
- Major General Ed Davis, CBE
- The Rev. Jonathan Woodhouse, QHC, Royal Army Chaplains' Department
- Rear Admiral Duncan Laurence Potts
- Air Marshal Christopher Paul Anthony Evans, OStJ QHP FRAeS
- Air Vice-Marshal Graham John Howard

=== The Most Distinguished Order of Saint Michael and Saint George ===
Order of St Michael and St George ribbon

==== Knight/Dame Commander of the Order of Saint Michael and Saint George (KCMG/DCMG) ====
- Brendan Gormley, MBE – Lately Chief Executive, Disasters Emergency Committee (DEC)
- Christopher Hohn – Founder and UK Foundation Trustee, The Children's Investment Fund Foundation (CIFF)
- Philip Martin Lowe – Lately Director General, European Commission, Brussels
- Simon McDonald, CMG – HM Ambassador, Germany
- Sebastian Wood, CMG – HM Ambassador, China

Honorary Dame Commander

- Angelina Jolie – for services to UK foreign policy and the campaign to end war zone sexual violence

==== Companion of the Order of Saint Michael and Saint George (CMG) ====
- John Casson – Private Secretary for Foreign Affairs, Prime Minister's Office
- Andrew Thomas Cayley, QC – Lately International Co-Prosecutor, Extraordinary Chambers in the Courts of Cambodia
- Simon Collis – HM Ambassador, Iraq
- Matthew Gould, MBE – HM Ambassador, Israel
- Ian Hughes – HM Ambassador, South Sudan
- Patrick Joseph McGuinness, OBE – Deputy National Security Adviser
- Menna Rawlins – Director, Human Resources, Foreign and Commonwealth Office
- David Leslie Stanton – Lately Chair, Board of Trustees, UNICEF UK
- Christopher Adrian Whomersley – Deputy Legal Adviser, Foreign and Commonwealth Office

=== Royal Victorian Order ===
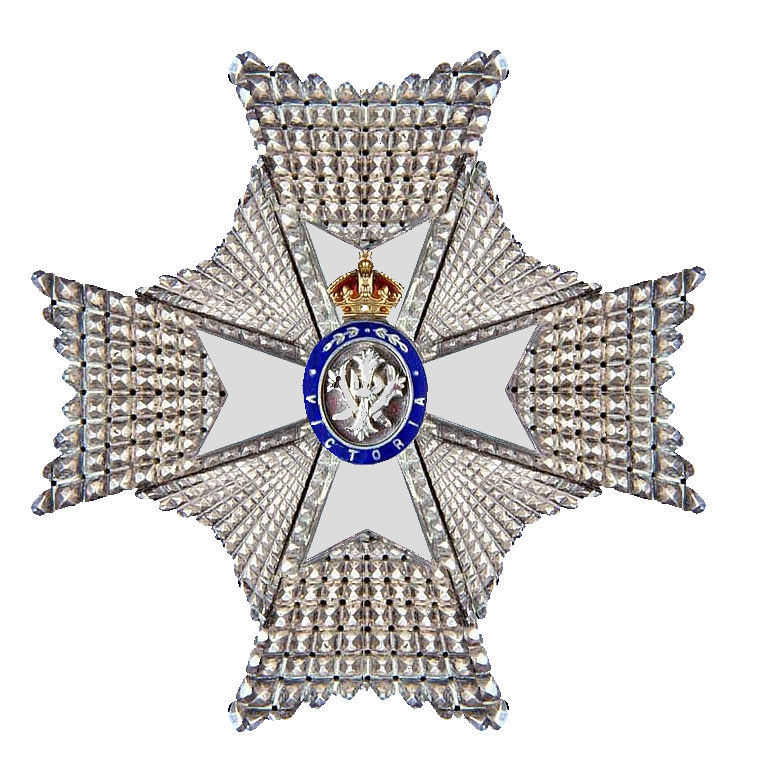
Insignia of a Knight / Dame Commander of the Royal Victorian Order

Royal Victorian Order ribbon

==== Knight/Dame Commander of the Royal Victorian Order (KCVO/DCVO) ====
- The Lady Juliet Margaret Townsend, LVO, Lord Lieutenant of Northamptonshire
- Nigel Sherlock, OBE JP, Lord Lieutenant of Tyne and Wear

==== Commander of the Royal Victorian Order (CVO) ====
- Marion Teresa Brewis, Lord Lieutenant of Wigtown
- David Barker Moody, Lord Lieutenant of South Yorkshire
- Anne Helen Richards, Member of Council, Duchy of Lancaster

==== Lieutenant of the Royal Victorian Order (LVO) ====
- Doctor Veronica Mary Geneste Ferguson, Surgeon-Oculist to the Royal Household
- Barbara Helen Kerry Francois, MVO, Visitor Experience Director, Royal Collection Trust
- Inspector Robert Fulton, MVO, Metropolitan Police. For services to Royalty Protection
- Nigel George Goldsmith, MVO RVM, Deputy Assistant to the Master of the Household, C Branch, Royal Household
- Catherine Anne Goodman, Artistic Director, The Prince's Drawing School
- Amanda Madeleine MacManus, Deputy Private Secretary to The Duchess of Cornwall
- Richard Alfred Martin Edward George Pattle, MVO, Royal Air Force, Master of the Household to The Prince of Wales and The Duchess of Cornwall
- Michael John Taylor, MVO, Assistant to the Master of the Household, Operations and Finance, Royal Household
- Major Jeremy Frederick Warren, Lieutenant, Her Majesty's Body Guard of the Honourable Corps of Gentlemen at Arms

==== Member of the Royal Victorian Order (MVO) ====
- David John Peter Baldwin, RVM, Serjeant of the Vestry, Chapel Royal, St. James's Palace
- Philip John Berg, Master of the Music, The Queen's Chapel of the Savoy
- John Anthony Coleman, director, BLB Architects Ltd
- Adrian John Denman, RVM, Head Gardener, Royal Gardens, Windsor
- Philippa Jane Meryl Dutton, Assistant Secretary, Royal Warrant Holders' Association
- Anne Cecilia Geddes, Accounts Clerk, Balmoral Estate
- Francis Edmund Harris, RVM, Palace Attendant, Buckingham Palace
- Andrew Joseph Hitchman, RVM The Duke of York's Household
- Mary Victoria Inglefield, Senior Secretary, The Duke of Edinburgh's Household
- Suzy Juliet Lethbridge, Correspondence Secretary, The Duke of Edinburgh's Household
- Lynne Margaret Patchett, Personal Assistant to the Deputy Master of the Household
- David Russell Quick, RVM, Household of The Earl and Countess of Wessex
- Graham Paul Richards, RVM, Household of The Duke of York
- Gary Robertson, RVM, Leading Porter/Craft Assistant, Palace of Holyroodhouse
- Brian William Stephen Birnie Tougher, RVM, Household of The Earl and Countess of Wessex
- Joanne Evadne Watt, Financial Accountant, Royal Household
- Margaret Nicol Westwood, Secretary to the Librarian/Office Administrator, Royal Library, Windsor Castle
- David Wheatroft, formerly Clerk to the Lieutenancy, Derbyshire.
- Philip Anthony Egerton Williamson, Deputy Head, Ullswater Centre, Outward Bound Trust.
- Major General Henry Gabriel Woods, CB MBE MC DL, Co-Founder and formerly chairman, The Duke of York's Community Initiative.
- Inspector Jeremy Dawson Woolgar, Metropolitan Police. For services to Royalty Protection

=== Royal Victorian Medal (RVM) ===
Royal Victorian Medal ribbon

Gold

- Nancy Fenwick, RVM, For services to The Queen
- Stephen Richard Frohawk, RVM, Tractor Driver, Sandringham Estate

Silver

- Gordon Holliday Currie, Assistant Carpet Planner, Royal Household
- Jason Edwin Dennis, Gardener, Sandringham Estate
- Neil Hepple Dodds, Frogmore Gardens Supervisor, Crown Estate, Windsor
- Marc David Harrison, Page of the Presence, Royal Household
- Constable John Patrick Murphy, Metropolitan Police. For services to Royalty Protection
- Richard Gordon Quirk, Yeoman Bed Goer, The Queen's Body Guard of the Yeomen of the Guard
- Alan Philip Scales, formerly Messenger, Coutts & Co
- Stephen John Staines, Foreman, Highgrove Estate

=== The Most Excellent Order of the British Empire ===
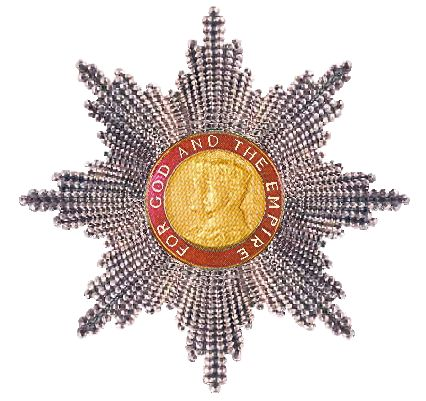
Insignia of a Knight / Dame Grand Cross of the Order of the British Empire

Order of the British Empire (Military division) ribbon

Order of the British Empire (Civil division) ribbon

==== Knight/Dame Commander of the Order of the British Empire (KBE/DBE) ====
Military

- Lieutenant General Simon Mayall, CB, 1st Queen's Dragoon Guards

Civil

- Katharine Mary Barker, CBE, Economist. For services to the Economy.
- Professor Jessica Lois Corner, Dean of Health Sciences, University of Southampton. For services to Healthcare Research and Education.
- Laura Davies, CBE, Professional Golfer. For services to Golf.
- Dr Pamela Louise Makin, Chief Executive Officer, British Technology Group plc. For services to the Life Sciences Industry.
- Hilary Mantel, CBE FRSL (Mrs G. McEwen), Author. For services to Literature.
- Nicola Jane Nelson-Taylor, Executive Headteacher, Beech Hill and Walbottle Village Primary Schools, Newcastle upon Tyne. For services to Education.
- Erica Pienaar, lately Executive Headteacher, Leathersellers' Federation of Schools, Lewisham. For services to Education.
- The Rt Hon. Dawn Primarolo, MP, Member of Parliament for Bristol South. For political service.
- Zandra Rhodes, CBE RDI, Fashion Designer. For services to British Fashion and Textiles.

==== Commander of the Order of the British Empire (CBE) ====
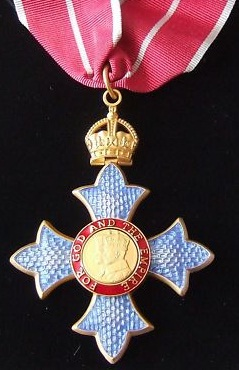
Neck badge of a Commander of the Military Division of the Order of the British Empire

Military

- Major General Ewan Blythe Carmichael, MBE OStJ QHDS, Royal Army Dental Corps
- Brigadier Mark Redman Goldsack, OBE, The Rifles
- Brigadier Giles Patrick Hill, The Parachute Regiment
- Colonel Robert Jefferies, Royal Regiment of Scotland
- Brigadier Robert Daniel Meinertzhagen, Royal Corps of Signals
- Major General Ranald Torquil Ian Munro, TD, The Parachute Regiment Army Reserve
- Major General Richard James Semple, Corps of Royal Engineers
- Commodore Keith Andrew Beckett
- Rear Admiral Stephen Buchanan Brunton
- Commodore Paul Anthony Mcalpine, OBE
- Air Commodore David John Edwin Cooper

Civil

- Professor Alastair Samuel Adair. For services to Higher Education in Northern Ireland.
- Jane Muriel Mallord, Mrs. Allberry, Deputy Director, Screening and Sexual Health, Department of Health. For services to Health Policy on Cancer and Heart Disease.
- Elizabeth Martin, Mrs Allen, Headteacher, Newstead Wood School for Girls, Orpington, London. For services to Education.
- Dr. Rosalind Altmann. For services to Pensioners and Pension Provision.
- Jane Victoria, Mrs. Barker. For services to the Financial and Insurance Services Industries and voluntary service.
- Dr. Sam Barrell, chief clinical officer, NHS South Devon and Torbay Clinical Commissioning Group. For services to Clinical Commissioning and Integrated Health and Care.
- John Berry, Artistic Director, English National Opera. For services to Music.
- Professor Martin Biddle, OBE, Archaeologist. For services to Archaeology.
- Ms Bridget Penelope Blow. For services to Business in the West Midlands and the British Chamber of Commerce Movement.
- Matthew Philip Bowcock, Philanthropist. For services to Community Philanthropy.
- Steven Michael Stuart Bramley, Deputy Legal Adviser, Legal Advisers' Branch, Home Office. For public service.
- Andrew Douglas Brownsword, Philanthropist. For charitable services to the Arts, Heritage and Health in Bath and South West England.
- Marcus James Sterling Bryson, Chief Executive, GKN Aerospace Group. For services to the UK Aerospace Sector.
- Alistair Buchan, Chief Executive, Orkney Islands Council. For services to Local Government.
- Miss Susan Margaret Bullock, Opera Singer. For services to Opera.
- Ms Stephanie Burras, Chief Executive, Ahead Partnership. For services to Business in Yorkshire.
- Andrew Carter, Councillor and Leader of the Conservative Group, Leeds City Council. For services to Local Government.
- William Henry Rymer Cayton, OBE, Chief Executive, Professional Standards Authority. For services to Health Care and Regulatory Reform.
- Michael Duncan Clark, Founder, Michael Clark Company. For services to Dance.
- Richard James Coackley, Director of Energy Development, Environmental and Natural Resources, URS. For services to Civil Engineering.
- Penelope, Viscountess Cobham, Chairman, VisitEngland. For services to Tourism.
- Giles Cockerill, Ministry of Defence. For services to Defence.
- Barry Cox, Head of Debt Management, Department for Work and Pensions. For services to Debt Management and to the community through Christians Against Poverty.
- Professor Nicholas Francis Robert Crafts, Professor of Economic History, University of Warwick and director, ESRC Research Centre on Competitive Advantage in the Global Economy. For services to Economics.
- Professor Robert Anthony Cryan, D.L., Vice-Chancellor, University of Huddersfield. For services to Higher Education.
- Major General (Archibald) Peter Neil Currie, C.B., lately chairman, Board of Trustees, Combat Stress. For voluntary service to Veterans with Mental Health Problems.
- Professor David Thomas Delpy, F.R.S., lately Chief Executive, Engineering and Physical Sciences Research Council. For services to Engineering and Scientific Research.
- Alistair Bruce Dodds, lately Chief Executive, Highland Council. For services to Local Government.
- Francis Desmond Dolan, Head of Debt Pursuit, Debt Management and Banking, H.M. Revenue and Customs. For services to Debt Management and Reform.
- The Reverend Norman Walker Drummond, Founder and chairman, Columba 1400. For public and voluntary service, particularly to Young People.
- Dr. Francis Gerard Dunn, D.L., President, Royal College of Physicians and Surgeons of Glasgow. For services to Cardiology and the community in Glasgow.
- Ms Dawn Eastmead, Deputy Director, National Fire Policy, Department for Communities and Local Government. For services to Communities and Fire Safety.
- Ms Charlotte Edwards, MBE, Captain, England Women's Cricket Team. For services to Cricket.
- Stephen Joseph Egan, Deputy Chief Executive and Director of Finance and Corporate Resources, Higher Education Funding Council for England. For services to Higher Education.
- Richard Leslie Everitt, lately chief executive officer, Port of London Authority and Chair, UK Major Ports Group and Maritime UK. For services to Transport.
- Ms Elizabeth Jill Filkin. For public service.
- Ms Janice Evelyn Flawn, Founder, PJ Care. For services to the Care Home Business and Charitable Fundraising.
- Elizabeth Jane, Mrs. Fothergill, Chairman, Pennine Healthcare. For services to the Healthcare Products Industry.
- Professor James Mackenzie Fraser, lately Principal and Vice- Chancellor, University of the Highlands and Islands. For services to Higher Education in Scotland and to the Free Church of Scotland.
- Ms Linda Mary Garbett, Headteacher, The Priory School, Shrewsbury. For services to Education.
- Judith Kyle, Mrs. Gillespie, OBE, Deputy Chief Constable, Police Service of Northern Ireland. For services to Policing and the community in Northern Ireland.
- David James Gow, Inventor, I-Limb Hand. For services to Upper Limb Prosthetics.
- Professor Hilary Mavis Graham, Professor of Health Sciences, University of York. For services to Public Health Research.
- Philip Nevill Green. For services to Business and to Charity in the UK and South Africa.
- Professor Helen Hally, director, Race for Health. For services to Healthcare and to the community in Lanarkshire.
- Rupert Nicholas Hambro, Philanthropist. For charitable services.
- Daniel Edward Harvey, OBE, lately chairman, National Museums Northern Ireland. For services to Museums in Northern Ireland.
- Dr. Glynis Henry, Chief Executive, Northern Ireland Practice and Education Council for Nurses and Midwives. For services to Healthcare in Northern Ireland.
- Peter Paul Sinton-Hewitt, Founder, Parkrun. For services to Grassroots Sport Participation.
- Robert Owen Humphreys, director, Open University Wales. For services to Education and voluntary public service in Wales.
- Michael Edwin Hurn, director, Project Sponsorship, HS2 Ltd. For services to the Rail Industry.
- Professor Colin David Hugh Jones, Professor of History, Queen Mary University of London. For services to Historical Research and Higher Education.
- Sylvia Vaughan, Mrs. Jones, Headteacher, Valentines High School, London Borough of Redbridge. For services to Education.
- Ms Helen Judge, director, Criminal Justice Group, Ministry of Justice. For services to Criminal Justice.
- Dr. David Mark Lan, Artistic Director, The Young Vic. For services to Theatre.
- Charles Roy Lancaster, OBE, Gardener and Broadcaster. For services to Horticulture and charity.
- Professor Catherine Mary Law, OBE, Professor of Public Health and Epidemiology, University College London Institute of Child Health. For services to Public Health.
- Sonny Leong. For political service.
- Professor Denise Anne Lievesley, Professor of Statistics and Head of School of Social Science and Public Policy, King's College London. For services to Social Science.
- Alastair David Lukies, Founder and chief executive officer, Monitise. For services to Mobile Banking and charity.
- Professor David Mabey, director, Wellcome Trust Bloomsbury Centre for Clinical Tropical Medicine. For services to International Health Development in Africa and Asia.
- Ms Kathleen Mary Mainland, Chief Executive, Edinburgh Festival Fringe Society. For services to Culture in Scotland.
- Mark Mallalieu, Head of DFID Afghanistan, Department for International Development. For services to International Development.
- Sunita Dinesh, Mrs. Mason. For services to Public Protection.
- Colin Stephen Matthews, chief executive officer, Heathrow Airport. For services to Aviation.
- Bernard Joseph McGahan, Deputy Permanent Secretary, Regional Planning and Transportation Group, Department for Regional Development, Northern Ireland Executive. For services to Public Transport.
- Stephen McGill, Group President, Aon and Founding Trustee, Find a Better Way. For services to the Insurance Industry and voluntary Humanitarian services.
- Neil Martin McLean, lately Chair, Leeds City Region Local Enterprise Partnership. For services to Business and Skills in West Yorkshire.
- Ammar Yusuf Mirza, Managing Director, AmmarM and co-Founder, Asian Business Connexions. For services to Business and the community in the North East.
- Peter Kenneth Mitchell, Education Adviser, Edge Foundation and Senior Education Adviser, Baker Dearing Educational Trust. For services to Education.
- Salim Mitha, lately Deputy Director, Policy Specialist, London, H.M Revenue and Customs. For services to Tax Policy Work.
- Nosheena, Mrs. Mobarik, OBE, lately Chair, CBI Scotland. For services to Business and public service in Scotland.
- The Honourable Ruth, Lady Morris of Kenwood. For services to the community.
- Professor Walter Nimmo, F.R.S.E., Philanthropist. For charitable and philanthropic services to Higher Education and the community in Scotland.
- Professor Christopher John Dillon Packard, F.R.S.E., Research and Development Director and Consultant Clinical Scientist, NHS Greater Glasgow and Clyde. For services to Clinical Science.
- Professor Lesley Ann Page, President, Royal College of Midwives. For services to Midwifery.
- Dr. Christabel Phyllis Peacock, Founder and Chair, Sidai Africa Ltd. For services to Agricultural Development in Africa.
- Mark Andrew Pears, chief executive officer, William Pears Group and co-founder, The Pears Foundation. For services to Business and to Charity.
- Dr. Emma Louise Pennery, Clinical Director, Breast Cancer Care. For services to People Affected by Breast Cancer.
- Dr. John Harris Robinson. For services to Engineering and charity.
- Professor Joseph Rykwert, Architecture Critic and Historian. For services to Architecture.
- Professor Jeremy Keith Morris Sanders, F.R.S., Pro-Vice-Chancellor for Institutional Affairs and Professor of Chemistry, University of Cambridge. For services to Scientific Research.
- Ms Helen Elizabeth Russell Sayles, co-founder, The Saltire Foundation. For services to the Development of Scottish Companies.
- Samuel Gurney Sheppard. For services to the Horse Breeding Industry and the Rural Economy.
- Christine Ann, Mrs. Slaymaker, Principal, Farnborough College of Technology. For services to Further Education.
- Ms Susan Snowdon, Executive Headteacher, Beal High School, London Borough of Redbridge. For services to Education.
- Dr. Helen Mary Stephenson, director, Office of Civil Society, Cabinet Office. For services to Civil Society.
- Dr. Robert Alwyn Sykes, Headteacher, Thornden School, Chandler's Ford, Hampshire. For services to Education.
- Ms Pauline Ann Tambling, Joint chief executive officer, Creative and Cultural Skills. For services to Education and Training in the Cultural Sector.
- Kim, Mrs. Thorneywork, lately Interim Chief Executive, Skills Funding Agency. For services to Education, Learning and Skills.
- Professor Dominic Tildesley, Chair, E-infrastructure Leadership Council. For services to Science, Technology and Business.
- Councillor Paul Tilsley, MBE, lately Deputy Leader, Birmingham City Council. For services to Local Government.
- Miss Valerie Malvia May Todd, Commissioner, UK Commission for Employment and Skills and Director of Talent and Resources, Crossrail Ltd. For services to Skills Training and Development of Young People.
- Simon James Alexander Toole, Head of Exploration, Licensing and Development, Department of Energy and Climate Change. For services to Oil and Gas and Energy Infrastructure Development.
- Professor Susan Mary Vinnicombe, OBE, director, International Centre for Women Leaders, Cranfield University. For services to Gender Equality.
- Professor Alan Walker, Professor of Social Policy and Social Gerontology and New Dynamics of Ageing Director, University of Sheffield. For services to Social Science.
- Councillor Robert George Wellington, leader, Torfaen County Borough Council. For services to Local Government, Heritage and the community in Torfaen and Wales.
- Ms Joanna Mary Whelan, Deputy Chief Executive, Debt Management Office. For services to Public Finance.
- Professor Michael John Worton, lately Vice-Provost and Fielden Professor of French Language and Literature, University College London. For services to Higher Education.

Diplomatic Service and Overseas List

- The Honourable Ms Paula Ann Cox, lately Premier of Bermuda. For public service in Bermuda.
- Richard Alan Rosling, OBE, co-Founder, Kiran Energy. For services to British business interests in India.

==== Officer of the Order of the British Empire (OBE) ====
Civil

- Christopher Hanson-Abbott, Chairman, Brigade Electronics plc. For services to Vehicle Road Safety.
- Edward George Noel Alcock. For public and voluntary service in Suffolk.
- Maxine Winifred, Mrs. Aldred, Member, Federation of Small Businesses. For services to Small Businesses.
- Raymond Anderson, Chair, Stakeholder Working Group on Unrecorded Rights of Way, Natural England. For services to Public Access.
- Norman Keir Atkinson, lately Senior Service Manager, Angus Council. For services to the community in Angus.
- Fiona, Mrs. Ballantyne. For services to Culture in Scotland.
- John Barton, General Secretary, Retained Firefighters Union. For services to Fire and Rescue Services.
- Ms Lesley Batchelor, Director General, Institute of Export. For services to Business.
- Alexander David Beatty, Vice-President, Advanced Weapon Systems, Thales UK Ltd. For services to the Aerospace and Defence Industries in Northern Ireland.
- Darcus Beese, President, Island Records. For services to the UK Music Industry.
- Ms Lorna Bertrand, Head of International Evidence and Partnerships Team, Department for Education. For services to Education.
- Christopher Nigel Bilsland, Chamberlain, City of London. For services to Local Government Finance and the City of London Corporation.
- Ms Karen Tracey Blackett, Chief Executive Officer, MediaCom. For services to the Media Communications Industry.
- Ms Sally Louise Bolton, General Manager, Rugby League World Cup 2013. For services to Rugby League.
- Dr. David John Braben, Founder and Chief Executive Officer, Frontier Developments plc. For services to the UK Computer and Video Games Industry.
- Ms Vanessa Brady, Founder, Society of British and International Design. For services to the Interior Design Industry and the UK Economy.
- Andrea, Miss Bryden, Senior Manager, Personal Tax Operations, Bradford, H.M. Revenue and Customs. For services to Promoting Diversity and Equality.
- Richard Sean Card, Vice President, Operations, KBR. For operational support to the Armed Forces.
- Councillor Michael Carr, Councillor, Middlesbrough Council. For public service to Education and Regeneration in Middlesbrough.
- Nicholas John Carter, Defence Adviser, Ministry of Defence. For services to Defence Restructuring in Afghanistan.
- Gillian Elizabeth, Mrs. Cartwright, Headteacher, Old Park School, Brierley Hill, West Midlands. For services to Education.
- David John Chantler, Chief Executive Officer, West Mercia Probation Trust. For services to Public Protection and Reducing Re-offending.
- Jonathan Corderoy Cheshire, Chief Executive, Wheatsheaf Trust. For services to Social Enterprise and to the community in Hampshire.
- Gillian Angela, Mrs. Clarke, Lead Nurse for Gynaecological Services, Stockport NHS Foundation Trust. For services to Nursing.
- Professor Sarah Cleaveland, F.R.S.E., Professor of Comparative Epidemiology, University of Glasgow. For services to Veterinary Epidemiology.
- Ms Chantal Jane Coady, Chocolatier. For services to Chocolate Making.
- Dr. John Hugh Coakley, Medical Director and Deputy Chief Executive, Homerton University Hospital NHS Foundation Trust, London. For services to the NHS.
- Martin Kenneth Colclough, Head of Sports Recovery, Help for Heroes. For services to Disability Sport in the Armed Forces.
- Andrew James Cole, Chief Executive, Bliss. For services to Neonatal Care.
- Nicholas Adrian Colloff, lately Director of Innovation, Oxfam. For services to International Development.
- Ruth, Mrs. Connelly, Head of Broadcasting, Scottish Parliament. For parliamentary service.
- Amanda Sara, Mrs. Cooper, Director of Information, Thames Valley Police. For services to Policing in Buckinghamshire, Oxfordshire and Berkshire.
- Ms Margaret Jull Costa, Translator. For services to Literature.
- Kenneth Crawford, lately Head of Aviation, Transport Scotland. For services to Aviation in Scotland.
- Garrett Joseph Cullen, Assistant Chief Inspector, Inspectorate of Borders and Immigration, Home Office. For services to Immigration and Asylum Management.
- John Cumming. For services to Jazz.
- Professor Carol Irene Curran. For services to Nursing and Education in Northern Ireland.
- Ms Janet Goldie Lawrie Daisley, Joint Chief Executive, Springboard Consultancy. For services to the Empowerment and Development of Women in the UK and Worldwide.
- Dr. John Gerard Daly, Lead Clinician, Respiratory Services, Western Health and Social Services Trust. For services to the Medical Profession in Northern Ireland.
- (Edward) Hunter Davies, Author. For services to Literature.
- Dr. Penelope Jane Davies, Senior Lecturer in Mathematics, University of Strathclyde. For services to Mathematics.
- Arthur Dean, Co-Founder and President, Dwarf Sport Association UK. For services to People and their Families with Achondraplasia and Restricted Growth and to Disability Sports.
- Penelope Jane, Mrs. Dean, Co-Founder, Dwarf Sport Association UK. For services to People and their Families with Achondraplasia and Restricted Growth.
- James Lawrence Dick, D.L., Co-Founder and Chairman, CatZero. For services to Youth Development and Business in Hull and East Yorkshire.
- Dr. Hilary Margaret Dobson, Consultant Radiologist and Clinical Director, West of Scotland Breast Screening Service, NHS Greater Glasgow. For services to the Detection of Breast Cancer.
- Kathleen Anne, Mrs. Donegan, Governor-in-Charge, Cornton Vale, Scottish Prison Service. For services to the Criminal Justice System.
- Fintan Donohue, Chief Executive Officer, Gazelle Group. For services to Further Education.
- William Harry Dove, MBE, J.P., lately Chairman, City Bridge Trust Committee. For voluntary and charitable services in London.
- Dr. Amanda Doyle, Chief Clinical Officer, NHS Blackpool Clinical Commissioning Group. For services to Primary Care.
- Simon D’Olier Duckworth, D.L., Board Member, Association of Police and Crime Commissioners and lately Chairman, National Olympics Security Oversight Group. For services to Policing.
- Ms Andrea Clare Duncan, National Programme Manager, Sexual Health Team, Department of Health. For services to Sexual Health.
- Heather, Mrs. Dunk, Principal, Ayrshire College. For services to Further and Higher Education in Ayrshire.
- Sue, Mrs. Dunkerton, Director, Knowledge Transfer Network. For services to Health and Engineering.
- Roger Edwin Easthope, Headteacher, Cheam Common Junior School, Sutton. For services to Education.
- Ms Elaine Edgar, Head of Policy for Carers, Department of Health. For services to Carers.
- Cherry Anne, Mrs. Edwards, Headteacher, Bourne Abbey Church of England Primary Academy, Bourne, Lincolnshire. For services to Education.
- Antony William Elliott, Founder and Chief Executive, The Fairbanking Foundation. For services to Bank Customers.
- Nigel John Evans, Chair, England Golf. For services to Amateur Golf.
- Gibril Faal, J.P., Chair, African Foundation for Development. For services to International Development.
- Dr. Anthony Dale Falconer, President, Royal College of Obstetricians and Gynaecologists. For services to Women’s Health Care.
- Kay, Mrs. Fawcett, Chief Nurse, University Hospitals Birmingham NHS Foundation Trust. For services to Nursing.
- Michael Paul Firth, Senior Adviser, Funding Allocations and Student Support, Education Funding Agency. For services to Education and to the Scouts in South Yorkshire.
- Professor Julie Lydia Fitzpatrick, Scientific Director, Moredun Research Institute and Chief Executive, Moredun Foundation. For services to Animal Health and Science.
- Ms Rosemary French, Executive Director, Gatwick Diamond Initiative. For services to Women in Business.
- Ms Katharine Frood, Headteacher, Eleanor Palmer Primary School, London Borough of Camden. For services to Education.
- Warren David Gatland, Head Rugby Coach, Wales. For services to Rugby.
- Ms Oonagh Mary Gay, Head of the Parliament and Constitution Centre, House of Commons Library. For services to the House of Commons.
- Stephen Goodman, Director, Morning Lane Associates. For services to Child Protection.
- Sharon Margaret, Mrs. Grant. For services to the community and to the Arts in Tottenham, North London.
- Janet Patricia, Mrs. Grasty, President, UN Women UK National Committee. For services to Women’s Rights.
- Miss Jenefer Dawn Greenwood, Board Counsellor, The Crown Estate. For services to the UK Real Estate Industry and voluntary service to Young People.
- Dr.Jane Clare Grenville, Deputy Vice Chancellor and Pro-Vice Chancellor for Students, University of York. For services to Higher Education.
- Robert Lloyd Griffiths, Director, Institute of Directors, Wales. For services to the Economy in Wales and for voluntary services, including to Autism in Wales.
- Ms Kate Elizabeth Gross, Deputy Director for Strategy, Department for Business, Innovations and Skills. For services to public and charitable sectors.
- |Ms Christabel Gurney. For political service, particularly to Human Rights.
- Michael Joseph Gutman, Managing Director (Europe), Westfield. For services to the UK Business Services and Retail Regeneration.
- Angela, Mrs. Harding, Co-Founder and Trustee, Christopher Place. For services to Children with Hearing Impairments and Complex Language Needs.
- Derek Harvey, Group Partnership Manager, Work Services Directorate, Department for Work and Pensions. For services to Employment and Partnership Working in London.
- Ms Lesley Hastie, Team Leader, Local Government Pension Scheme and Local Intelligence Team, Department for Education. For services to Education and Friends of the Rebel Trust.
- Dr. Howard James Hastings, Managing Director, Hastings Hotels Group. For services to Tourism and Hospitality.
- Dorothy Helen, Mrs. Hatfield, Member, Consultant and Adviser, Women’s Engineering Society. For services to Engineering.
- Susan Jennifer, Mrs. Hattersley, Team Leader, Food Standards Agency. For services to the Improvement and Development of UK Food Allergy Policy and Research.
- Dr. Paul Martin Hawkins, Managing Director and Chairman, Hawk-Eye Innovations Ltd. For services to Technology and Sport.
- Janet, Mrs. Hayward, Headteacher, Cadoxton Primary School, Barry, Vale of Glamorgan. For services to Education.
- Ms Margot Jane Heller, Director, South London Gallery. For services to the Arts.
- Ms Annette Hazel Hennessy, Chief Executive, Merseyside Probation Trust. For services to Public Protection and Reducing Re-offending.
- Peter Richard Wavell Hensman, D.L. For voluntary service to the Rural Economy in Cumbria.
- Charles William Roland Heslop, President, National Conservative Convention. For voluntary political service.
- Michael Redmond Heylin, lately Chair, Angling Trust. For services to Angling.
- David James Robert Hill, Chief Executive, Milton Keynes Council. For services to Local Government.
- David Michael William Hodgkiss, Chief Executive, William Hare Group. For services to Manufacturing and Exporting.
- David Michael Hodson, Partner, The International Family Law Group LLP, London. For services to International Family Law.
- Councillor Christopher Ashleigh Holley, Councillor, Swansea Council. For political service and service to the community in Swansea.
- Neil Alan Hopkins, lately Principal, Peter Symonds Sixth Form College, Winchester, Hampshire. For services to Education.
- George Dunne Cameron Hosking, Founder and Chief Executive Officer, WAVE Trust. For services to reducing violence, particularly Child Abuse.
- Robert Mairs Houston, lately Chief Veterinary Officer, Department of Agriculture and Rural Development, Northern Ireland Executive. For services to Veterinary Science in Northern Ireland.
- Susan, Mrs. Houston, Assistant Director, Yorkshire, Humber and the North East, Department for Business, Innovation and Skills. For services to the Economy in the North East.
- Richard Patrick Blakiston Houston. For services to Natural and Built Heritage in Northern Ireland.
- Barry George Huggett, Headmaster, More House School and Chair, Special Needs Committee, Independent Schools’ Council. For services to Education.
- John Edward Jones, lately Deputy Head, Chemical Biological Radiological Nuclear Explosive Security and Terrorism Unit, Home Office. For services to Counter Terrorism.
- Karen Jane, Mrs. Jones, Crown Advocate, Special Crime and Counter Terrorism Division, Crown Prosecution Service. For services to Law and Order, particularly Counter Terrorism Prosecutions.
- Pamela, Mrs. Jones, lately Headteacher, Ifield School, Gravesend. For services to Education.
- Anne, Mrs. Kelaart, D.L. For services to the Rural community in Oxfordshire.
- Dr Steve Kell, Chair, NHS Bassetlaw Clinical Commissioning Group. For services to Primary Care.
- Derrick Kelleher, Head of Operations, Organised Crime Command, National Crime Agency. For services to Law Enforcement.
- Professor Michael Howard Kelly, Professor of French, University of Southampton. For services to Higher Education and to European Co-operation.
- Ms Ann Pamela Kenworthy, Legal Director, Howells LLP. For services to Legal Aid.
- Lieutenant Colonel Martyn Frederick Kingsford, TD. For services to Housing Tenants and Community Engagement.
- Stuart Kinsey. For services to Humanitarian Action and International Search and Rescue.
- Robin Klassnik, Founder and Director, Matt’s Gallery. For services to the Visual Arts.
- Ms Loraine Elise Knowles, Stonehenge Project Director, English Heritage. For services to Heritage.
- Ms Sylvia Lancaster, Founder, The Sophie Lancaster Foundation. For services to Community Cohesion, particularly reducing Hate Crime.
- Ms Phyllida Ann Law. For services to Drama and for charitable services.
- Peter John Lawrence, Deputy Director, Cabinet Office. For services to Transparency.
- Sandra, Mrs. Lawton, Nurse Consultant Dermatology, Queen’s Medical Centre, Nottingham University Hospitals NHS Trust. For services to Nursing.
- Marion Kay, Mrs. Layberry, Managing Director, Safehouses Fostering Agency. For services to Children and Families.
- Edward Peter Shephard Leask. For services to Sailing, Young People and Philanthropy.
- Gordon John Lee, Chief Executive Officer, Malachi Community Trust. For services to Children.
- Damian Watcyn Lewis, Actor. For services to Drama.
- Martin Steven Lewis, Founder, Money Saving Expert. For services to Consumer Rights and charitable services through the MSE Charity Fund.
- Robert John Linham, Head, Council of Europe Human Rights Policy, Ministry of Justice. For services to Human Rights Policy.
- Professor Julie Lydon, Vice Chancellor, University of South Wales. For services to Higher Education in Wales.
- Professor Jill Elizabeth Maben, Professor of Nursing Research and Director of the National Nursing Research Unit, King’s College London. For services to Nursing.
- Ms Elspeth Catriona MacArthur, lately Member, Judicial Appointments Board for Scotland. For services to Judicial Appointments.
- Kenneth Angus MacIver. For services to Gaelic Broadcasting and to the community in the Western Isles.
- Gerard Marr, lately Chief Executive, NHS Tayside. For services to the NHS.
- Councillor Shelagh Marshall. For services to Older People.
- Dr. Helen Elizabeth Mason, Reader in Solar Physics, University of Cambridge. For services to Higher Education and to Women in Science, Engineering and Technology.
- Talvinder Singh Matharoo, Tabla Player, Producer and Composer. For services to Music.
- Sonia Elizabeth, Mrs. McColl, Founder, Park Home Owners Justice Campaign. For services to Park Home Residents.
- Julian Edward Metcalfe, MBE For services to the Hospitality Industry.
- Steven Peter Michael, Chief Executive, South West Yorkshire Partnership NHS Foundation Trust. For services to Healthcare.
- Ms Sarah Elizabeth Montgomery, lately Head, Development Team and Senior DFID Representative, Helmand Provincial Reconstruction Team, Department for International Development. For services to Stabilisation and Development in Helmand, Afghanistan.
- Margaret Jane, Mrs. Moor, lately Head of Benefits, Benefit Directorate, Department for Work and Pensions. For services to People with Disabilities and to Charitable Fundraising.
- Malcolm Morley, B.E.M., lately Chair, British Wrestling Association. For services to Wrestling.
- Thanos Antony Morphitis, Director of Strategy and Commissioning for Children’s Services, London Borough of Islington. For services to Children and Families.
- Elizabeth, Mrs. Morris, Headteacher, Netherton Infant and Nursery School, Huddersfield. For services to Education.
- Julie Marie, Mrs. Morris, Project Manager, Ministry of Defence. For services to the UK Submarine Construction Programme.
- Kendrick Cecil Morris, Headteacher, Hamstead Hall Academy, Birmingham. For services to Education and Community Cohesion in Birmingham.
- Roger John Bowring Morris, Chair of Governors, Northampton College and Chair, Association of Colleges Governors’ Council. For services to Further Education.
- James Neill Morton, Principal, Portora Royal School, Enniskillen. For services to Education in Northern Ireland.
- Sean Murphy, Principal Scientist, Ministry of Defence. For services to Military Operational Capability.
- Ms Sharmila Nebhrajani, Chief Executive, Association of Medical Research Charities. For services to Medical Research.
- Paul Anthony Nolan, Director, Mersey Forest, Cheshire West and Chester Council. For services to Forestry.
- Ms Caroline Mary Nursey, Executive Director, BBC Media Action. For services to Media Development in Developing Countries.
- Graeme John Nuttall, Partner, Field Fisher Waterhouse LLP. For services to Employee Ownership, Employee Share Schemes and Public Service Mutuals.
- Kavita, Mrs. Oberoi, Founder and Managing Director, Oberoi Consulting Ltd. For services to Entrepreneurship and Start Up Businesses.
- Anupam Ojha, Director, National Space Academy. For services to Science Education.
- Stephen Michael O’Leary, Team Leader, Ministry of Defence. For services to Military Operational Capability and for the Help for Heroes charity in Somerset.
- Susan Margaret, Mrs. Oliver, Chair, European League Against Rheumatism Healthcare Professional Standing Committee. For services to Rheumatology Healthcare.
- Henry James O’Neil, lately Chief Executive Officer, UK Financial Investments. For services to the British Banking Industry.
- Maurice Samuel Ostro, Entrepreneur. For services to Business, charity and Interfaith Relations in London.
- Jonathan Robert Owen, Co-Founder, Teach First. For services to Education.
- Ms Belinda Parmar, Chief Executive Officer, Lady Geek. For services to Women in Technology.
- Professor Margaret Patterson, Principal Scientific Officer, Agri-Food and Biosciences Institute. For services to the Agri-Food Industry, particularly Food Safety and Quality.
- Dr. Timothy Charles Peakman, Deputy Chief Executive, UK Biobank, University of Manchester. For services to Medical Research.
- Stephen George Bevan Phillips, Director, Conservative Voluntary Party and Party Conference. For political service.
- Sarah Jane, Mrs. Pickup, Director of Social Services, Hertfordshire County Council. For services to Social Care.
- Professor Isobel Anne Pollock, lately President, Institution of Mechanical Engineers. For services to Mechanical Engineering.
- Ms Yvonne Powell, lately Headteacher, Little Ilford School, London Borough of Newham. For services to Education.
- Ms Paula Pryke, Florist. For services to the Floral Design Industry.
- Barbara Mary, Mrs. Radcliffe, Founder, Care Training Consortium. For services to Home Care Training and the community in South West Scotland.
- Faisel Rahman, Founder and Managing Director, Fair Finance. For services to Community Finance.
- Vivien Jayne, Mrs. Randall, Headteacher, Colmore Infant and Nursery School, Birmingham. For services to Education.
- Hilary Frances, Mrs. Ratcliffe. For services to Promoting Gender Equality Overseas.
- Ms Alice Rawsthorn, Design Critic, International New York Times. For services to Design and the Arts.
- Katharine Mary, Mrs. Reid. For political service, particularly in Kingston upon Thames.
- Jeremy Charles Richardson, Contact Centre Manager, Network Services Directorate, Department for Work and Pensions. For services to Unemployed People and voluntary service in Derby.
- Professor Barry Alexander Kenneth Rider. For services to the Prevention of Economic Crime.
- Ms Brett Rogers, Director, The Photographers' Gallery. For services to the Arts.
- Professor Polly Roy, Professor of Virology, London School of Hygiene and Tropical Medicine. For services to Virus Research.
- Professor Alan Bernard Rushton, lately Chair of Board of Trustees, PAC, London. For services to Adoption and Children.
- Rosemary Geraldine, Mrs. Winter-Scott, Chief Executive, Accountant in Bankruptcy. For public service to Insolvency Services in Scotland and voluntary service to Education through Jordanhill School.
- Professor Jonathan Sigmund Shalit, Founder and Chair, ROAR Global. For services to the Entertainment Industry.
- Ms Victoria Susan Hull Sharp, Founder and Chief Executive, London Music Masters. For services to Music.
- Professor Aziz Sheikh, Professor of Primary Care Research and Development, University of Edinburgh. For services to Medicine.
- Professor David Shemmings, Professor of Social Work, University of Kent. For services to Child Protection.
- Susan Elizabeth, Mrs. Sheridan, President, Nightingale Fellowship. For services to Nursing.
- Ms Rachael Shimmin, (Mrs. Stancliffe-White), Corporate Director, Children and Adult Services, Durham County Council. For services to Social Care.
- John Andrew Simpson, Chief Editor, Oxford English Dictionary. For services to Literature.
- Trishna Devi Pall, Mrs. Singh, Director, Sikh Sanjog. For services to the community in Edinburgh, particularly to the Sikh community.
- Anthony John Singleton, Chief Operating Officer, Government Digital Service, Cabinet Office. For services to the Provision and Improvement of Digital Public Services.
- Barbara Jane, Mrs. Slater, Director, BBC Sport. For services to Sports Broadcasting.
- Sean Joseph Turner Smith, Senior Manager, I.T. Accessibility, H.M. Revenue and Customs, Liverpool. For services to People with Disabilities.
- Paul Southworth. For services to Business, Arts and the community in Northamptonshire.
- Dr. Andrew Spurr, Managing Director, Nuclear Generation, EDF Energy. For services to the Energy Industry and the UK Economy.
- Professor Elizabeth Anne Stanko, Assistant Director, Corporate Development, Metropolitan Police Service. For services to Reducing Crime and Disorder and Enhancing Public Confidence in Policing.
- Alan William Stanton, Co-Founder and Director, Stanton Williams. For services to Architecture.
- Edward Arthur Stevens, Chairman, National Self Build Association. For services to Housing in England.
- Frances Clare, Mrs. Stevens, Chair, Birmingham Governors’ Network and Chair of Governors, Stanville Primary School. For services to Education.
- Clive Anthony Stobbs, Chief Executive Officer, Autism Anglia. For services to People with Autism.
- Professor John Joseph Strain. For services to Nutrition Research and Higher Education.
- Ms Janis Elizabeth Susskind, Managing Director, Boosey and Hawkes Music Publishers Ltd. For services to Music.
- Ms Shahien Taj, MBE, Executive Director, Henna Foundation. For services to Victims of Honour-Based Violence and Forced Marriage.
- Nisha, Mrs. Tandon, Chief Executive, ArtsEkta. For services to Minority Ethnic communities in Northern Ireland.
- Ms Anna Kim Taylor, Senior Nutrition Adviser, Department for International Development. For services to Tackling Global Undernutrition.
- Carolyn Ann, Mrs. Taylor, lately Head of Benefit Centres, Benefit Centre Directorate, Jobcentre Plus. For services to Benefits Delivery and charitable services.
- Ms Susan Carol Terpilowski, Managing Director, Image Line Communications Ltd. For services to Small Businesses in London.
- Andrew Thin, lately Chair, Scottish Natural Heritage. For services to the Environment and Rural Affairs in Scotland.
- David Jeffrey Thomas, T.D., Senior Legal Business Adviser, Common Platform Programme, Crown Prosecution Service. For services to Law and Order, particularly Digital Transformation.
- Susan, Mrs. Tipping, Ministry of Defence. For services to Defence.
- Ms Johanne Tomlinson, Staff Nurse, HMP Stafford, Staffordshire and Stoke on Trent Partnership NHS Trust. For services to Prison Nursing.
- Dr. Hilary Claire Tucker, Chair, Greater Manchester Probation Trust. For services to Public Protection and Reducing Re-offending.
- Professor Lorna Winifred Unwin, lately Professor and Chair, Vocational Education, Institute of Education, University of London. For services to Vocational Education and Training.
- Anne Jacqueline, Mrs. Wadsworth. For services to charitable giving in the UK.
- David Leslie Walker, Founder and Chairman, Autochair. For services to People with Disabilities.
- Ms Margaret Dianne Walls, School Governor, Oliver Thomas Nursery School, London Borough of Newham. For services to Education and to the community in East Ham.
- Ms Catherine Anne Walsh, Principal and Chief Executive Officer, Barking and Dagenham College. For services to Further Education.
- Martin Edward Walsh, lately Head of Policy, Animals in Science Regulation Unit, Home Office. For services to Science.
- Susan Helen, Mrs. Walsh, Principal and Chief Executive, Glasgow Clyde College. For services to Further Education.
- John James Ward. For services to the charitable and voluntary sector in Lancashire.
- The Reverend John Norman Wates, Trustee, Rehabilitation for Addicted Prisoners Trust. For charitable services to the Arts, Criminal Justice and to the community in Chipstead, Surrey.
- Anthony David Rex Watts. For services to Older People.
- David John Way, lately Director, Knowledge Exchange and Special Projects, Technology Strategy Board. For services to Technology, Innovation and Manufacturing.
- Professor David John Williams, Director, EPSRC Centre for Innovative Manufacturing in Regenerative Medicine. For services to Science and Engineering.
- Paul Maurice Williams, Co-Founder and Director, Stanton Williams. For services to Architecture.
- Ms Elizabeth Anne Willis, Joint Chief Executive, Springboard Consultancy. For services to the Empowerment and Development of Women in the UK and Worldwide.
- Barbara Anne, Mrs. Wilson, Assistant Director, Border Force, Home Office. For services to Border Security.
- Ms Kathryn Lucy Hay Winskell, Pro Vice-Chancellor for Business and Engagement, Northumbria University. For services to Higher Education and the Economy in the North East.
- Mark Featherstone-Witty, Founding Principal and Chief Executive, Liverpool Institute for Performing Arts. For services to Higher Education.
- William Adams Wolsey, Managing Director, Beannchor Ltd. For services to Business and the Hospitality Industry in Northern Ireland.
- Dr. Joy Margaret Woodhouse, Senior Lecturer, School of Optometry and Vision Sciences, Cardiff University. For services to Optometry and for services to People with Disabilities.
- Keith Spencer Woodley, lately Pro-Chancellor and Member of Council, University of Bath. For services to Higher Education.
- Patrick John Dobrée Woodroffe, Lighting Designer. For services to the Arts.
- Dr. Robert Norman Woodward. For charitable services in Bristol.
- Namron Yarrum. For services to Dance.
- Alan George Yellup, Executive Headteacher, Wakefield City Academy and Chief Executive Officer, Wakefield City Academies Trust. For services to Education.

Military

- Commander Mark Gareth Deller
- Commander Mark Robert Honnoraty
- Commander James Mcnair
- Lieutenant Colonel Gerard Connor O’Hara, Royal Marines
- Lieutenant Colonel Rupert James Pulvertaft, Royal Marines
- Captain Berkeley John Stanley-Whyte, Royal Navy
- Lieutenant Colonel Timothy Robert Blackmore, The Royal Logistic Corps
- Colonel Neil Alexander Den–McKay, MBE, The Royal Regiment of Scotland
- Lieutenant Colonel Oliver Jerome Kingsury, MBE, The Parachute Regiment
- Colonel Simon Andrew Lawrence, Corps of Royal Engineers
- Colonel Nicholas Scott Makin, Royal Regiment of Artillery
- Lieutenant Colonel Alan William Thomas McComb, Royal Corps of Signals
- Colonel Thomas Michael McMullen, MBE, Cumbria Army Cadet Force
- Lieutenant Colonel Richard Evelyn Robert Morphew, The Royal Irish Regiment
- Colonel James Lyon Murray–Playfair, MBE, late Royal Regiment of Fusiliers
- Lieutenant Colonel Richard Charles Pope, Royal Army Veterinary Corps
- Lieutenant Colonel Peter Anthony Reid, Adjutant General's Corps (Staff and Personnel Support Branch)
- Lieutenant Colonel Henry Terence Stewart Ricketts, Corps of Royal Engineers
- Wing Commander Simon James Bellamy
- Group Captain Paul Alexander Godfrey
- Group Captain Victoria Patricia Gosling, MBE
- Wing Commander Gethyn William Hill
- Wing Commander Lynn Johnson
- Wing Commander Anthony Christian Keeling, MBE
- Wing Commander Andrew Paul Sandilands

Diplomatic Service and Overseas List

- George Alfrerd Charles Bassadone, Chairman, Bassadone Automotive Group, Gibraltar. For services to the automotive industry and to the economy of Gibraltar.
- Jennifer Rachel, Mrs. Bibbings, Partner, Trowers & Hamlin, and Honorary Legal Adviser, British Embassy Dubai, UAE. For services to British business interests and to the community in Dubai.
- Stephen Bowden, First Secretary, Foreign and Commonwealth Office. For services to UK national security.
- Juliet Marie, Mrs. Maric Capeling, Head, Crisis Management Department, Foreign and Commonwealth Office. For services to crisis assistance to British nationals overseas.
- Nigel Patrick Daly, Chairman, BAFTA, Los Angeles, USA. For services to the British film and television industry.
- Ms Lyse Marie Doucet, Chief International Correspondent, BBC. For services to British broadcast journalism.
- Benjamin James Fender, Political Counsellor, British Embassy, Kabul, Afghanistan. For services to British interests in Afghanistan.
- John Patrick Gildea, Head, International English Language Testing Service, British Council. For services to the development of English Language Testing overseas.
- Andreas Hansen, Head, Society and Innovation, British Council. For services to innovation in developing educational and sporting opportunities for young people overseas.
- Oliver Edward Hayes, First Secretary, British High Commission, Islamabad, Pakistan. For services to British diplomacy.
- Emma Kate, Mrs. Hopkins, Head, Preventing Sexual Violence Initiative, Conflict Department Foreign and Commonwealth Office. For services to preventing sexual violence in conflict-affected countries overseas.
- Peter Brian Howes, lately Managing Director, Governance and Risk, Samruk Kazyna, Astana, Kazakhstan. For services to British commercial interests in Kazakhstan.
- Dr. Christopher Dennis Hutchinson, Senior Technology Analyst, IAEA, Vienna, Austria. For services to the International Atomic Energy Agency.
- Ms Louisa Winn Hutton, Architect, Sauerbruch Hutton Architects, Berlin, Germany. For services to British architecture.
- Ms Brigid Anne Inder, Executive Director, Women’s Initiatives for Gender Justice. For services to women’s rights and international justice.
- Detective Chief Inspector Robert David Jeffery, Regional Counter Terrorism Liaison Officer, British High Commission, Nairobi, Kenya. For services to UK national security.
- David Barnett Kogan, Non-Executive Director, FCO Services. For services to the development and governance of FCO Services.
- Maurice David Landau, Journalist and author. For services to advancing UK/Israel understanding and peace in the Middle East.
- Tin Htar Swe, Mrs. Lowe, Editor, BBC Burmese, BBC World Service. For services to British broadcast journalism.
- Alan Angus Harry Macdonald, lately Director, United Nations Mine Action Co-ordination Centre of Afghanistan. For services to the clearance of land mines in Afghanistan.
- Michael Dominic Finn Medley, lately Spokesman, Office for the NATO Senior Civilian Representative, Kabul, Afghanistan. For services to the development of independent media in Afghanistan.
- Nikesh Ashvinkumar Mehta, Counsellor, Foreign Policy and Security, British High Commission, Kuala Lumpur, Malaysia. For services to British foreign policy, British interests in Malaysia, and to promoting diversity.
- Wasim Mir, Head, Projects Task Force, Foreign and Commonwealth Office. For services to new and innovative ways of working and diversity in the Foreign and Commonwealth Office.
- Jonathan Charles Moss, lately Senior Governance Adviser, Provincial Reconstruction Team, Helmand, Afghanistan. For services to development and stabilisation in Helmand, Afghanistan.
- John William Alan Okell, Lecturer (Retired), School of Oriental and African Studies, London University. For services to UK/Burma relations.
- Dr. Robert Parsons, MBE, Founder, Hope for Children. For services to disadvantaged children in the UK and overseas.
- Ms Madeleine Selina Rees, Secretary General, Women’s International League for Peace and Freedom. For services to human rights, particularly women’s rights, and international peace and security.
- Dr. Graham Paul Schneider, lately Honorary Legal Adviser, British Embassy, Vienna, Austria. For services to British interests and to the British community in Austria.
- Professor Charles Reginald Connon Shephard, lately Environmental Adviser to the Commissioner, British Indian Ocean Territory. For services to environmental conservation in the British Indian Ocean Territory.
- Michael Nicholas Snowman. For services to promoting British cultural interests in France.
- Richard James Squire, First Secretary, British Embassy, Washington, USA. For services to international diplomacy.
- Robert Vincent Williams, Chief Executive, War Child. For services to protecting and improving the lives of children, including those affected by conflict overseas.

==== Member of the Order of the British Empire (MBE) ====
Civil

- Colin R. McInnes, FRSE FRAeS FInstP FREng
- Dr. Peter Wothers
- Nicholas Pidgeon
- Sylvia Park
- Dr. Robert Samuel Andrews
- Lieutenant Colonel Ian Ballantyne
- John Scot Barrowman
- Ruth Margaret Bell, JP
- Gail Broadhurst
- Gary Buxton
- Dr. Jaya Chakrabarti Gallemore – for services to the Creative and Digital Industries and to the community in Bristol
- Nicola Vivian Alexandra Clarke
- Melanie Anne Craddock
- Sheenagh Davis
- John Bruce Glover
- Doctor Roger Phillip Griffiths
- Gary Peter Andrew Harris
- Colonel David James Hill
- David Hilton
- Susan Christine Hughes
- Damian Peter Christian Johnson
- Linda Grace Kennedy
- Cerys Matthews – for services to music
- Catriona Gibson McBeath
- Enid Bertha Patient
- Richard Bertrand Player
- James Fergus Rosie
- Michelle Smith
- Howard Martin Stuchfield, JP
- Stephen Sutton – for services to charity
- Richard Taylor
- Dr Andrew John Treharne
- Susan Jane Westlake
- Clyde Emmanuel White, BEM
- Emma Bryony Woolf

Military

- Major Scott Ashley, Royal Marines
- Surgeon Commander Andrew Brown
- chief petty officerLogistics (Supply Chain) Ivor Cross
- Commander Simon Evan James David
- Lieutenant Commander Neil Charles Loughrey
- Petty Officer (Diver) Andrew Charles Marshall
- Lieutenant Commander Larry Roy Nicholls
- Chief Petty Officer Warfare Specialist (Underwater Warfare) Darren Mark Rayner
- Lieutenant Commander (RNR, SCC) Alfred Simpson, Sea Cadet Corps
- Captain Trevor Smith, Royal Marines
- Warrant Officer 1 Marc Wicks, Royal Marines
- Captain Heidi Miriam Alexandra Blackwood, 1st (Northern Ireland) Battalion Army Cadet Force
- Captain Adrian Eric Blanchard, The Royal Logistic Corps Army Reserve
- Warrant Officer Class 2 Paul Andrew Brewer, The Yorkshire Regiment
- Captain Michael James Brigham, The Mercian Regiment
- Lieutenant Colonel Anthony James Christie, Corps of Royal Engineers
- Captain Robert Lloyd Clifford, Royal Corps of Signals
- Major Michael James Cooke, The Royal Regiment of Fusiliers
- Warrant Officer Class 2 Kenneth Newton Craddock, The Yorkshire Regiment Army Reserve
- Major Simon Charles Dean Culver, Royal Regiment of Artillery
- Lieutenant Colonel Judith Anne Dando, Adjutant General’s Corps (Educational and Training Services Branch) Army Reserve
- Major Paul Richard Eagle, Adjutant General’s Corps (Staff and Personnel Support Branch)
- Lieutenant Colonel Philip Charles Evason, TD, The Parachute Regiment Army Reserve
- Major James Robert Fawcett, Royal Army Medical Corps
- Major Gordon Gask, Grenadier Guards
- Major Andrew Stephen Green, Corps of Royal Engineers
- Sergeant Robert Andrew John Gue, Adjutant General's Corps (Royal Military Police)
- Major Craig Stephen Hallas, Army Air Corps
- Major Dennis George Hannant, The Royal Logistic Corps Army Reserve
- Major John Hanson, Corps of Royal Electrical and Mechanical Engineers
- Lieutenant Colonel Edward Peter William Hayward, The Blues and Royals (1st The Royal Horse Guards and Dragoons)
- Captain David Peter Henson, Corps of Royal Engineers
- Major Denis Howard, The Royal Logistic Corps
- Major Timothy John Iddon, Royal Regiment of Artillery
- Major Damian Robert Jenkins, Royal Army Medical Corps
- Major Wynne Jones, TD, The Royal Logistic Corps Army Reserve
- Major Peter Andrew Le Feuvre, Royal Army Medical Corps
- Warrant Officer Class 1 David Lochrie, Coldstream Guards
- Major Nicola Jane Macleod, Royal Army Medical Corps
- Major Barry Roy Melia, The Rifles
- Corporal Martyn James O'Connor, Intelligence Corps
- Major John Phillip Osborn, Gloucestershire Army Cadet Force
- Major Sally Elizabeth Powling, Adjutant General's Corps (Educational and Training Services Branch)
- Staff Sergeant Tony James Richardson, Royal Army Physical Training Corps
- Major Gary Trevor Sawyer, The Rifles
- Lieutenant Colonel Hervey John Scott, Royal Corps of Signals
- Lieutenant Colonel Ian Harold Scrivens, Corps of Royal Engineers
- Major William Oliver James Steel, The Royal Logistic Corps
- Major Benjamin Roy Greenhalgh Taylor, Corps of Royal Electrical and Mechanical Engineers
- Sergeant Richard John Thisby, Royal Regiment of Artillery
- Warrant Officer Class 1 Martin John Thorp, The Parachute Regiment
- Major William Saunders Turner, Corps of Royal Engineers
- Lieutenant Colonel William John Ladbrook Waugh, Royal Tank Regiment
- Major Andrew Wilson, Royal Regiment of Artillery
- Sergeant Graham John Woolcock, The Princess of Wales's Royal Regiment
- Warrant Officer Carl John Bell
- Corporal Ryan Mark Burrows
- Squadron Leader John David Butler, AFC
- Chief Technician Michael Russell Frankish
- Warrant Officer David Daubney Lloyd
- Warrant Officer Steven David Marshall
- Squadron Leader Louise Victoria Parker
- Wing Commander Richard David Presland, Royal Air Force Volunteer Reserve
- Squadron Leader Thomas David John Rees
- Squadron Leader Gareth Lloyd Roberts
- Warrant Officer Kevin Geoffrey Smith
- Squadron Leader Mark Ruser Taylor
- Squadron Leader Maurice Leslie Thompson, Royal Air Force Volunteer Reserve (Training)

=== British Empire Medal (BEM) ===
British Empire Medal (Military division) ribbon

British Empire Medal (Civil division) ribbon

Civil

- Norman Black – for services to the Reserve Forces and Cadet Association and the community in Northern Ireland
- Adam Caruthers – for voluntary service to the Royal British Legion Scotland
- Holly Angharad Davies – for services to the Armed Forces Personnel
- Frank Donald Dayman – for voluntary service to Veterans and their Families
- Margaret Sarah Duff – for services to Veterans
- Agnes Gardiner – for services to Service Personnel
- Peter John Haydon – for voluntary service to First Aid
- Sylvia Heyes – for voluntary service to Veterans
- Marion Rose Hook – for voluntary service to First Aid
- Christoper Frederick Hore – for voluntary service to Veterans
- Katherine Diane Hull – for services to Veterans and their Families
- Lieutenant Colonel (Rtd) Cecil John Lawson – for voluntary service to the Army Cadet Force
- Valerie Sylvia Moosa – for voluntary service to the community in Bristol
- Lesley John Pond – for voluntary service to Armed Service Personnel through the Joint Services Adapative Ski Scheme
- Janet Mary Qualters – for services to Defence and charitable services through the Anthony Nolan Trust
- David James Sweetenham – for voluntary service to the Royal Air Forces Association
- Philip Stephen Wadey – for voluntary service to First Aid
- Philip Weight – for voluntary service to the Air Training Corps
- Brian Wood – for voluntary service to the Air Training Corps
- Norman Bennett Young – for voluntary service to Veterans and their Families
- Abu Zafar – for services to Business and to the Asian community

=== Royal Red Cross ===
Royal Red Cross ribbon

==== Associate (ARRC) ====
- Chief Petty Officer Naval Nurse Jenny Louise Dyson, Queen Alexandra's Royal Naval Nursing Service

=== Queen's Police Medal (QPM) ===
Queen's Police Medal ribbon

England and Wales

- Chief Constable Michael Barton – Durham Constabulary
- Deputy Chief Constable Derek Benson – Essex Police
- Constable Robert Bowman – West Yorkshire Police
- Constable Robert Brown – Metropolitan Police Service
- Assistant Chief Constable Andrew James Cooke – Merseyside Police
- Chief Constable Jeffery John Farrar – Gwent Police
- Constable Gaynor Grout – Surrey Police
- Deputy Assistant Commissioner Martin James Hewitt – Metropolitan Police Service
- Assistant Chief Constable Steven Anthony Heywood – Greater Manchester Police
- Constable John Keen – Metropolitan Police Service
- Constable Karen MacDonald – Avon and Somerset Constabulary
- Chief Superintendent Kevin Mulligan – Greater Manchester Police
- Detective Chief Superintendent Brendan O'Dowda – Thames Valley Police
- Constable Keith Openshaw – Avon and Somerset Constabulary
- Assistant Chief Constable Alison Roome-Gifford – Hertfordshire Constabulary
- Assistant Chief Constable Sharon Rowe – West Midlands Police
- Detective Chief Inspector David Shipperlee – British Transport Police
- Detective Chief Superintendent Kenneth Stewart – City of London Police

Scotland

- Chief Superintendent Andrew Bates – Police Scotland
- Derek Penman, lately Assistant Chief Constable, Local Policing North – Police Scotland

Northern Ireland

- Detective Constable Nigel Frederick Roden Algie – Police Service of Northern Ireland.
- Detective Superintendent Kevin Alexander Geddes – Police Service of Northern Ireland.
- Sergeant Stephen Paul Jamison – Police Service of Northern Ireland.
- Inspector Gordon McCalmont – Police Service of Northern Ireland.

=== Queen's Fire Service Medal (QFSM) ===
Queen's Fire Medal ribbon

England and Wales

- Jonathan Geoffrey Hall – Chief Fire Officer, Gloucestershire Fire & Rescue Service.
- Paul David Rower Hancock – Chief Fire Officer, Cheshire Fire & Rescue Service.
- Mark Stewart Jones – Chief Fire Officer, Buckinghamshire Fire & Rescue Service.
- Richard Geoffrey Lawrence – Deputy Chief Fire Officer, Hereford & Worcester Fire and Rescue Service.

Scotland

- David Boyle – Assistant Chief Officer, Scottish Fire and Rescue Service.
- Alex Clark – Deputy Chief Officer, Scottish Fire and Rescue Service.
- Lewis Ramsay – Assistant Chief Officer, Scottish Fire and Rescue Service.

=== Queen's Ambulance Service Medal (QAM) ===
Queen's Ambulance Service Medal ribbon

England and Wales

- Andrew Newton, Director of Clinical Operations and Consultant Paramedic, South East Coast Ambulance Service NHS Foundation Trust.
- Clifford Ward, Events Manager, East Midlands Ambulance Service.

Scotland

- Michael Herriot, General Manager, National Risk and Resilience Department, Scottish Ambulance Service.

Northern Ireland

- Robert 'Frank' Francis Orr, Ambulance Service Area Manager, Northern Ireland Ambulance Service.

=== Queen's Volunteer Reserves Medal (QVRM) ===
Queen's Volunteer Reserves Medal ribbon

- Staff Sergeant Yvonne Cooper, Adjutant General's Corps (Staff and Personnel Support Branch) Army Reserve
- Major Alexander John Finnen, MBE, Intelligence Corps Army Reserve
- Warrant Officer Class 2 Anthony Moorcroft, The Royal Logistic Corps Army Reserve
- Major Michael Sean Scott-Hyde, The Rifles Army Reserve
- Squadron Leader Jeffrey William Metcalfe, Royal Auxiliary Air Force

=== Overseas Territories Police Medal ===
Overseas Territories Police Medal ribbon

- Paul Richardson, Inspector, Royal Gibraltar Police
- Derek Tilbury, Constable, Royal Gibraltar Police
- Paul Wright, Assistant Commissioner, Bermuda Police Service

=== Promotions ===
- Admiral The Lord Boyce, KG GCB OBE DL, to be promoted to Admiral of the Fleet
- General The Lord Walker of Aldringham, GCB CMG CBE DL, to be promoted to Field Marshal
- Air Chief Marshal The Lord Stirrup, KG GCB AFC FRAeS FCMI, to be promoted to Marshal of the Royal Air Force

== Australia ==
The Queen's Birthday Honours 2014 for Australia were announced on 9 June 2014.

== Barbados ==
=== Most Excellent Order of the British Empire ===
==== Commander of the Order of the British Empire ====
- David Walter Bowden, For public service.
- Doctor Marjorie Patricia Downes-Grant, For services to the Financial Sector
- Lionel Livingstone Nurse, For public service

==== Officer of the Order of the British Empire ====
- Bertie Anderson Hinds, For his services to the Royal Barbados Police Force
- Patricia Angela, Mrs. Layne, For services as the Private Secretary to successive Governors-General and Acting Governor-General of Barbados
- Doctor Adrian St.Clair Harcourt Lorde, For services to Sport-Medicine

==== Member of the Order of the British Empire ====
- Desmond Anthony Browne, For services to Education
- Julian Ernest Chetvynde Rogers, For services to Broadcasting
- Carson St. Elmon Small, For services to the community

== Grenada ==
=== Most Excellent Order of the British Empire ===
==== Commander of the Order of the British Empire ====
- Jean Augustine, For services to Education and Politics

==== Officer of the Order of the British Empire ====
- Russel Fielden, For services to the Tourism Industry
- Ann Hopkin, For services to Nursing

==== Member of the Order of the British Empire ====
- Jean Griffiths, For services to the community and to the Sickle Cell Association
- Vincent Morain, For services to Education and to community development
- Francis Redhead, For services to Culture

=== British Empire Medal ===
- Maureen Charles, For services to the community and to the Dorothy Hopkin Home
- Wilfred Harris, For services to the community
- Peggy Nesfield, For services to the community
- Christopher Peterikn, For public service

== Guernsey ==
=== Most Excellent Order of the British Empire ===
==== Officer of the Order of the British Empire ====
- Doctor John Glyn Allen, For charitable work in Guernsey and overseas

==== Member of the Order of the British Empire ====
- Doctor Gregory Stevens Cox, For services to the history and culture of Guernsey

=== British Empire Medal ===
- Joan Marion Ozanne, For services to the community and to the Arts in Guernsey

== Isle of Man ==
=== Most Excellent Order of the British Empire ===
==== Member of the Order of the British Empire ====
- Timothy William Brian Culles, For services to International Financial Management
- Pamela Joyce Shimwell-Mayo, For services to Parkinson's Disease

=== British Empire Medal ===
- Judith Aronold, For services to CRUSE Bereavement Care, Isle of Man

== Jersey ==
=== Most Excellent Order of the British Empire ===
==== Officer of the Order of the British Empire ====
- Michael Nelson de la Haye, For services to the States of Jersey Assembly (the Parliament), and to the Commonwealth Parliamentary Association.

==== Member of the Order of the British Empire ====
- Monsignor Nicholas John France, For services to the Catholic and faith communities and ethnic groups in Jersey
- Derrick Ivor Frigot, For services to Agriculture, particularly the Jersey Breed of Cattle

=== British Empire Medal ===
- Jane Martinez Werrin, For services to charity, particularly Jersey Hospice Care and Holiday for Heroes

== Papua New Guinea ==
=== Knight Bachelor ===
- Toami Kulunga, OBE QPM, Senior Officer, Royal Papua New Guinea Constabulary and currently Police Commissioner

=== Most Distinguished Order of St Michael and St George ===
==== Companion of the Order of St Michael and St George ====
- The Honourable Nicolas Robert Pakek Kirriwom, Judge of the National and Supreme Courts; for services to the judiciary and to the legal profession
- The Honourable John Pundari, MP, For services to the community as Member of the National Parliament, Speaker and Deputy Prime Minister, and currently as Environment Minister

=== Most Excellent Order of the British Empire ===
==== Knight Commander of the Order of the British Empire ====
- The Honourable Gibuna Gibbs Salika, OBE, For services to law and to the judiciary as a Judge of the National and Supreme Courts and currently as Deputy Chief Justice.

==== Commander of the Order of the British Empire ====
Civil

- The Honourable Ambeng Kandakasi, Judge of the National and Supreme Courts; for services to the judiciary and to the legal profession
- Mick Nades, MBE, For services to cricket, professional training and to the Institute of Business Management
- Andrew Dallas Sterns, OBE QPM, Senior Officer, Royal Papua New Guinea Constabulary

Military

- Brigadier General Gilbert Toropo, MBE, Commander, Papua New Guinea Defence Force
- Captain (N) Alois Ur Tom, OBE, Papua New Guinea Defence Force

==== Officer of the Order of the British Empire ====
Civil

- Rowan Callick, For services to the Anglican Church, to journalism and to the education of national journalists
- Doctor Athithan Chelvanathan, For services to healthcare, Aerospace Medicine, and Air Niugini
- Paul Coleman, For services to commerce, the mining sector and to charities
- Rio Fiocco, For services to the legal profession and to the community
- Doctor Sibona Kopi, For services to the Central Province community, Education and to the Divine Word University
- Audrey Michael, For services to healthcare and to medical research
- Roy Harry Mumu, For public service in the areas of aviation, maritime and land transport
- Ray Paul, For public service in taxation and customs
- The Honourable Titus Philemon, MP, For services to the community as a Regional Member of the National Parliament and Governor of Milne Bay Province
- Wilson Penias Sagati, For services to the National Civil Aviation Safety Authority
- Kevin Smith, For services to the print media and to the community
- Doctor Amyna Sultan, For services to medicine, healthcare and to eye surgery
- Milo Timini, For services to the community and to politics
- Francis Nekemki Tokura, MBE QPM, Senior Officer, Royal Papua New Guinea Constabulary

Military

- Colonel Mark Goina, MBE, Papua New Guinea Defence Force

==== Member of the Order of the British Empire ====
Civil

- Joe Aglua, For public service
- Bob Bennett, For services to Rugby League in Papua New Guinea
- Mathew Damaru. For services to the Royal Papua New Guinea Constabulary
- Sister Cecily Daot, For services to the Catholic Church
- Thomas Eluh, QPM, For services to the Royal Papua New Guinea Constabulary
- Elizabeth Helali, For public service
- The Reverend Clarence Kapali, For services to the community and to the United Church
- Wesi Kerak, For services to healthcare
- Peni Benjamin Keris, For services to District and village Courts.
- Rachel Miate Leslie, For public service
- Ishmel Libitino, For public service in Forestry Management and Conservation
- Wabia Mara, For services to local government
- Lata Daya Milner, For services to the legal profession and to charities
- Albert Toro Morokea, For services to the television and film industry
- Monica Munulai, For services to the Public Curator's Office
- Timothy Papaki, For services to education
- Esther Sapulai, For services to Air Niugini
- The Reverend David Mesulam Sikar, For services to the United Church
- Charles Kopiou Siniu, For public service
- Doctor Benjamin Tahiza, For services to healthcare
- Tumbi Takayu, For services to the community
- Elizabeth Tau, For public service
- Benjamin Taupa, For services to Forestry Management
- victor Dandaya Wayaga, For services to education
- Monica Yibmaramba, For public service

Military

- Lieutenant Colonel Venua Vince Gabina, Papua New Guinea Defence Force
- Lieutenant Colonel Mark Sipou, Papua New Guinea Defence Force
- Commander Clement Tele, formerly Papua New Guinea Defence Force

=== British Empire Medal ===
Civil

- Nathaniel Aminio, For services to the Catholic Church
- Olga APELIS, For services to the airline industry
- Elsie Berobero, For services to the Police Force
- Pius Poksi Buamon, For services to the community
- Konio Dai, For public service
- Tom Tom Daure, For services to the United Church
- Walkaima Essy, For services to education
- Hillary Ganara, For services to village courts
- Humphrey Gitbia, For services to village courts
- Tido Gulup, For services to the community
- Ari Heai, For public service
- Noel Kaisa, For public service
- Dominic Kakas, For services to the Police Force
- Maria Kalpe, For services to rural healthcare
- Ulduepe Kewa, For services to the Evangelical Lutheran Church
- Rebecca Wera Kumai, For services to the community
- Peter Mox Landimi, For services to the community
- Esther Levo, For services to the Police Force
- Mary Maraga, For public service
- Navu Mititi, For services to the airline industry
- Nelson Mongea, For services to the Police Force
- Nilki Nebabe, For services to the community
- Andrew Sane Pekul, For services to the community
- Claire Rambu, For services to the Police Force
- Luke Param Saipera, For services to the community
- Frank Sandu, For services to rural healthcare
- Michael Huana Sirafe, For services to the community
- Isaac Kamong Telue, For public service
- Peter Tupa, For services to the Police Force
- John Apa Wagluo, For services to the Correctional Service
- John Wak Wamuna, For services to education
- Merick Wandipe, For services to rural healthcare
- Margaret Wera, For services to community healthcare
- Abraham Winura, For services to village courts
- Miriam Yangen, For public service
- Gobe Yuli, For services to education

Military

- Warrant Officer (N) Raphael Bowie, Papua New Guinea Defence Force
- chief warrant officerWaeya Busi, Papua New Guinea Defence Force
- Warrant Officer Simon Harembe, Papua New Guinea Defence Force
- Warrant Officer (N) Pousai Sei, Papua New Guinea Defence Force
- chief warrant officerDonald Yalom, Papua New Guinea Defence Force

=== Queen's Police Medal ===
- Chief Superintendent John Maru, Royal Papua New Guinea Constabulary
- Superintendent Ndrando Perou, Royal Papua New Guinea Constabulary
- Superintendent Johannes Yapi, Royal Papua New Guinea Constabulary

== Solomon Islands ==
=== Most Distinguished Order of St Michael and St George ===
==== Knight Commander of the Order of St Michael and St George ====
- Doctor Nathan Kere, For services to medicine and to the community

=== Most Excellent Order of the British Empire ===
==== Commander of the Order of the British Empire ====
- Father Fred Peter Seda, For services to the Church, to commerce and to the community
- Robert Sisilo, For Diplomatic Service and Community Development

==== Member of the Order of the British Empire ====
- Onoto'ona Riringa, For services to the Government in the Accounts Cadre and the Treasury Division

=== British Empire Medal ===
- John Kukuti, For services to commerce and to Community Development
- The Reverend Timothy Rex Laesanau, For services to the Government in the fields of education, the Church and the community
- Mostyn Mangau, For services to Policing and to the community
- Harry Raynolds, For services to teaching and to the community
- Fisher Rongiofo, For services to teaching and to the community
- Alice Dingarii Watoto, For services to nursing and to the community
- Tim Mung Wong, For services to commerce

==== Queen's Police Medal ====
- James Maelanga, For services to Policing and to Community Development
- Anika Nausi, For services to Policing and to Community Development

== Saint Lucia ==
=== Most Excellent Order of the British Empire ===
==== Commander of the Order of the British Empire ====
- Kenneth Augustin Hermas Foster, For services to Politics, the Law and the community

==== Officer of the Order of the British Empire ====
- Ronald Eshwardeen Ramjattan, For services to business
- Thomas Raynold Walcott, For services to engineering, politics and the public sector

==== Member of the Order of the British Empire ====
- Evans Calderon, For services to politics and the Law
- Winall Forbes Joshua, For services to the public and the community
- Bishnunarine Tulstie, For public service
- Fidelis Williams, For public service

=== British Empire Medal ===
- Hugh Perry Breustraal, For services to sport
- Mary Vianney Jn Pierre, For services to early childhood education

== Belize ==
=== Knight Bachelor ===
- Justice Manuel Sosa, CBE – For services to the judiciary.

=== Order of the British Empire ===
==== Commander of the Order of the British Empire ====
- Dr. Ellsworth R. Grant – For services to medicine

==== Member of the Order of the British Empire ====
- Pat Andrews – For services to the community and to banking.
- Stephen A. Duncan – For services to the community and to banking.
- Crystal Yvonne Vernon – For services to the community.
- Francis Paul Woods – For services to the community and to business.

== See also ==
- Australian Honours System
- New Zealand Royal Honours System
- Orders, decorations and medals of the United Kingdom
