= Hosking =

Hosking is a surname of Cornish origin. In Cornwall there are also the variant forms Hosken, Hoskin and Hoskins. Unlike many Cornish surnames which are associated with a small district, Hosking and its variants are distributed in west Cornwall (Hosking and Hosken), mid Cornwall (Hoskins) and east Cornwall (Hoskin). It has the meaning "sedgeman", i.e. a thatcher who makes roofs of sedge.

Notable people with the surname include:

- Barbara Hosking (broadcaster), British civil servant and broadcaster
- Bill Hosking, Australian rules footballer who played with Geelong in the Victorian Football League (VFL)
- Charles Ernest Hosking, Jr. (1924–1967), Medal of Honor recipient
- Eric Hosking OBE (1909–1991), English photographer noted for his bird photography
- Geoffrey Hosking (born 1942), historian of Russia and the Soviet Union
- George Hosking OBE, Quaker, economist, accountant, psychologist and clinical criminologist
- Henry Alfred Hosking (1908–1957), Liberal Party member of the Canadian House of Commons
- Janine Hosking, Australian documentary film maker
- Jeremy Hosking, British businessman noted for interests in railway heritage
- John Hosking (politician), Australian politician and first elected mayor of Sydney
- Mike Hosking, New Zealand television and radio journalist and presenter
- Rita Hosking, American composer and musician based in Davis, California
- Sampson Hosking, Australian rules footballer who played with and coached Port Adelaide in the SAFL
- Stuart Hosking (born 1965), British TV personality
- William Hosking FSA (1800–1861), writer, lecturer, and architect; influenced the development of London in Victorian times

== See also ==
- Arthur Hoskings (1872–1919), American and Australian cricketer
