= Maben =

Maben may refer to:

== Places ==
- Maben, Mississippi
- Maben, West Virginia
- Maben Airport, Prattsville, New York

== People ==
- Adrian Maben (1942–2025), British film and television director, writer, and producer
- Jill Maben, British nurse and academic
- Mamatha Maben (born 1970), Indian cricketer

== See also ==
- Mabyn, a medieval Cornish saint
