= The Queen's Award for Enterprise: Innovation (Technology) (2010) =

The Queen's Award for Enterprise: Innovation (Technology) (2010) was awarded on 21 April 2010, by Queen Elizabeth II.

== Recipients ==
The following organisations were awarded this year.

- ATB Morley Ltd of Stanningley, Pudsey, West Yorkshire for the design and manufacture of high voltage electric motors
- Chas. A. Blatchford & Sons Ltd of Basingstoke, Hampshire for development of energy-storing artificial feet.
- Brompton Bicycle Ltd of Brentford, Middlesex for folding bicycle designed for personal mobility.
- Camera Dynamics Ltd of Bury St Edmunds, Suffolk for engineering solutions for television camera support.
- Concateno of Abingdon, Oxfordshire for detection devices drug abuse.
- Contact Lens Precision Laboratories Ltd (trading as UltraVision CLPL) Leighton Buzzard, Bedfordshire KeraSoft contact lenses for irregular corneas and keratoconus.
- DANLERS Limited of Chippenham, Wiltshire for electronic switches for the energy saving control for lighting, heating, ventilation and air-conditioning units.
- Data Connection Ltd (trading as Metaswitch Networks) of Enfield, Middlesex for MetaSphere telephony application server.
- Delcam plc of Birmingham for CADCAM software for the dental industry.
- Domo Limited of Segensworth, for Solo4 wireless video surveillance system.
- Douglas Equipment Limited of Cheltenham, for electrically powered aircraft deck handling devices.
- Dunphy Combustion Ltd of Rochdale, Lancashire Ultra low for nOx stage fuel air combustion technology.
- DuPont Microcircuit Materials of Bristol for Solamet screen printable metallizations for crystalline silicon solar cells
- Dyecor Limited of Whitestone, Herefordshire for thermacor transportation system for diagnostic samples.
- Eckersley O'Callaghan Ltd of London N1 for design and development of structural glass.
- E-Tabs Limited of London NW9 for software solutions and services for automated reporting and graphical charting.
- Garford Farm Machinery of Peterborough or the InRow Weeder using vision analysis techniques.
- Halyard (M&I) Ltd of Salisbury, Wiltshire for marine exhaust silencing systems
- i2 Limited of Fulbourn, Cambridgeshire for intelligence-led operations platform.
- Integrated Display Systems Ltd of Wallsend, Tyne and Wear for belt tensioning system for power assisted steering.
- Makevale Group Ltd of Ware, Hertfordshire for non-carcinogenic acrylics for dentures, and medical grade bone cement material; optically clear acrylic powders, and acrylic bead powders.
- Malvern Instruments Ltd of Malvern, Worcestershire Zetasizer for nano analytical instrument for measuring particle properties.
- Mortimer Technology Ltd of Thatcham, Berkshire Development of the TORBED energy technologies.
- Multiclip Company Limited (trading as Vortok) of Plymouth, Devon for rail stressing roller
- Navtech Radar Ltd of Wantage, Oxfordshire for designs and manufacture of radar based sensors for security surveillance, industrial automation, and traffic sensing.
- Newtons4th Ltd of Loughborough, Leicestershire for power analysers for measuring electric power.
- ONELAN Limited of Henley-on-Thames, Oxfordshire for Net Top Boxes for converting displays into digital signage
- Oxford Instruments NanoScience of Abingdon, Oxfordshire for Triton200: cryogen-free dilution refrigerator with high field superconducting magnet.
- Reeves Wireline Technologies of Loughborough, Leicestershire for design, manufacture and support of geophysical logging equipment for oil and gas well surveys
- Joseph Rhodes Limited of Wakefield, for super plastic forming and diffusion bonding presses.
- S.R.A. Developments Ltd of Ashburton, Newton Abbot, Devon for ultrasonic haemostatic dissector for cutting soft tissue in surgery
- Salamander MooD Active Enterprise York (MooD Active Enterprise Business Unit) – architecture-driven software for business performance governance.
- SCIPAC Ltd of Sittingbourne, Kent for large scale production of human serum for transferrin.
- Simcyp Limited of Sheffield, South Yorkshire for modelling and simulation tools to evaluate medicines prior to human clinical trials.
- Surgical Innovations Limited of Leeds YelloPort for plus, a semi-disposable port access system.
- ThorpeGlen Limited of Ipswich, Suffolk for intercept and electronic monitoring solutions.
- Tickhill Engineering Co Ltd of Doncaster, South Yorkshire for vegetable packing machinery.
- Touch EMAS Ltd (trading as Touch Bionics) Livingston, Scotland for the i-LIMB Hand a bionic hand with articulating digits.
