= Annan Academy =

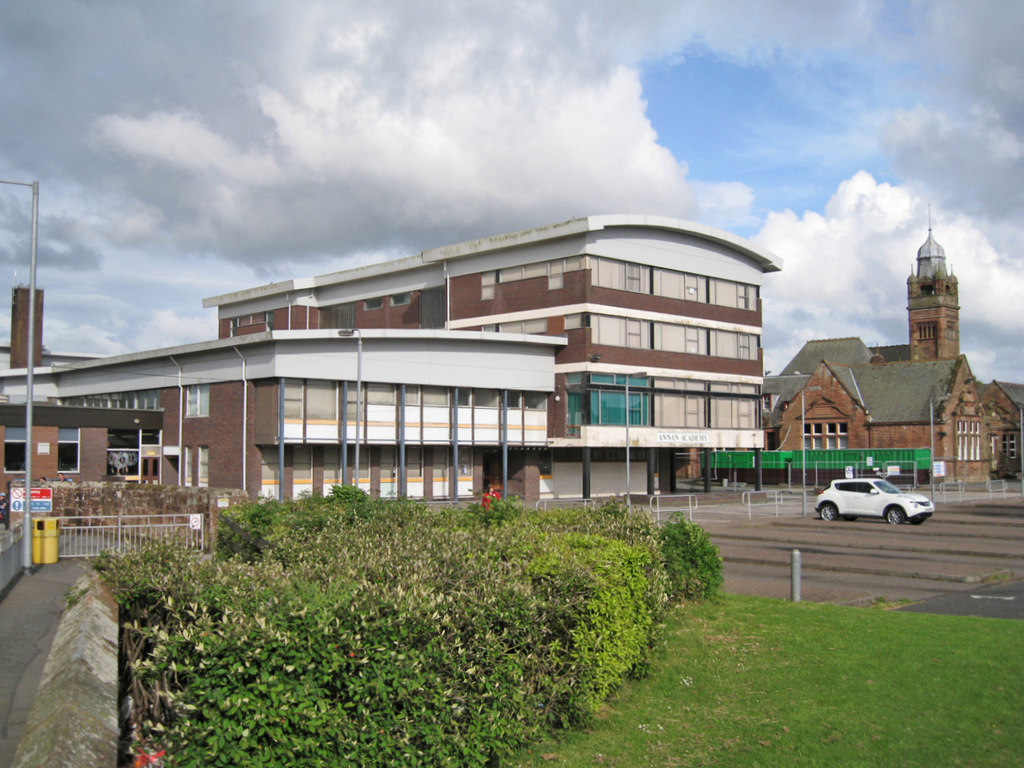

Location
- St John's Road; Annan, DG12 6AP; Scotland

Information
- Type: State coeducational secondary
- Established: 1802; 224 years ago
- Founder: Jordan Murray
- Rector: Ewan Murray
- Staff: 80 (approx FTE)
- Gender: Mixed
- Age: 11 to 18
- Enrolment: 908 (as of 2026)
- Houses: Bruce House, Douglas House, Solway House, Hoddom House and Kinmount House
- Colours: Black, Yellow
- Feeder schools: Elmvale, Hecklegirth, Gretna, Brydekirk, Newington, Eastriggs, Carrutherstown, Springfield, Kirkpatrick Fleming, Cummertrees, St Columba's
- School years: S1 to S6
- Website: blogs.glowscotland.org.uk/glowblogs/annanacademy/

Annan Academy is a secondary school in Annan, in Dumfries and Galloway, Scotland. The present school is the result of an amalgamation in 1921 of the original Annan Academy and Greenknowe Public School, although its history goes back to the 17th century. As of 2025, the school has 952 pupils attending.

Behind the buildings are the school's sports playing fields which additionally play host to local fairs and other outdoor functions such as the annual national pipe band competition. Adjacent to the school's main car and coach park, which is situated at the front of the buildings, lies the Annan public swimming baths and associated car park.

== History ==
The original Annan Academy, founded in 1802, was housed in a building in the town's Port St until 1820, when the council built new school premises in Ednam St. From there it moved to further new buildings in Greenknowe in 1840, and these were later replaced by larger ones with a distinctive bell-tower in 1895, which are still in use today and house the school's library; the original building was built by George McIldowie. The latter red sandstone buildings were joined during an expansion in the 1960s by several new buildings of contemporary style and construction, enabling it to accept more pupils from a wider catchment area. A new performing arts building was added in the 2010s.

== Sports ==
Annan United F.C. are a school football team affiliated with Annan Academy.

== Notable former pupils ==
- Russell Brown (1951–), Scottish Labour Party politician, Former MP for Dumfriesshire (1997–2005) and Dumfries and Galloway (UK Parliament constituency) (2005–2015)
- William Brown (1888–1975), mycologist and plant pathologist, head of botany at Imperial College London
- Thomas Carlyle (1795–1881), Scottish essayist, satirist, and historian
- David Gow (1957-), Bioengineer, inventor of the I-LIMB Hand
- Emma Harper (1967–), Scottish National Party MSP for the South Scotland region
- Ashley Jensen (1969–), star of Extras and Ugly Betty
- Edward Irving (1792–1834), Scottish clergyman
- Jim Wallace (1954–), Deputy First Minister of Scotland (1999–2005).
