= N00 =

N00 may refer to:

- Nephritic syndrome (ICD-10 code), a medical condition with the kidneys
- Maben Airport (FAA code), an airport in Prattsville, New York
