= Bill Hosking =

Australian rules footballer

Personal information
- Full name: Bill Hosking
- Born: 19 July 1940
- Original teams: Ballarat, Lismore (Vic)
- Height: 178 cm (5 ft 10 in)
- Weight: 74 kg (163 lb)

Playing career^{1}
Years	Club	Games (Goals)
1962	Geelong	5 (2)
- ^{1} Playing statistics correct to the end of 1962.

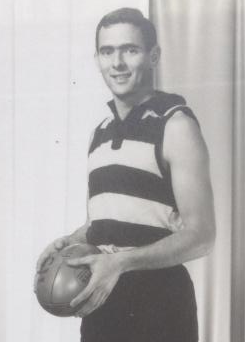

Bill Hosking (born 19 July 1940) is a former Australian rules footballer who played with Geelong in the Victorian Football League (VFL). He is the brother of Ron Hosking and the uncle of Scott Hosking, both of whom played for Geelong. Bill was the Lismore Football Club's Best and Fairest winner of 1958 and also played in the Geelong reserves Premiership team of 1963 alongside his brother Ron and fellow former Lismore Football Club teammate, John Fox.
