= Faal (surname) =

Faal is a surname. The surname is found in Senegal and the Gambia. In English speaking Gambia, it is spelt Faal, and in French speaking Senegal, it is spelt Fall but pronounced the same way throughout the Senegambia region. This surname is also found in Scotland, which is unrelated to the African surname and pronounced differently. In Scotland, the surname means "a rocky place." Notable people with the surname include:

- Ayden Faal, English rugby league footballer
- Essa M. Faal, Gambian international lawyer
- Gibril Faal (born 1967), British-Gambian businessman
- Saloum Faal (born 1995), Gambian footballer
- Tacko Fall (born 1995), Senegalese basketball player

== See also ==
- Phall
- Faal (disambiguation)
