= Faal (disambiguation) =

Faal, an alternative spelling for Phall, is a British Asian curry.

Faal may also refer to:

- Faal (surname)
- Alldays Airport (ICAO: FAAL), an airport serving Alldays, Limpopo province, South Africa
- A Fellow of the Australian Academy of Law

== See also ==
- Faala, Samoa
