= Kay Fawcett =

British nurse

Kay Fawcett OBE is a British nurse who is recognised for over 40 years service in the NHS and public health in the UK. Since the early 2000s Fawcett has held many senior positions across these services and her contribution has been recognised in the Honours List and by an Honorary degree from the University of Derby. She currently lives in Nuneaton

== Biography ==
=== Nursing career ===
Fawcett qualified as a nurse from the Warwickshire School of Nursing in 1980 and took various positions as a front line nurse in NHS hospitals across the East and West Midlands, before moving into management positions.

She has held various senior positions in the NHS, including as Executive Director of Nursing for Derby Hospitals from 2005-2008, as a Chief Nurse at University Hospitals Birmingham NHS Foundation Trust, and as Interim Executive Director of Nursing at George Eliot Hospital in Nuneaton, from 2017-2018.

=== Later career in the health sector ===
Since leaving roles in Nursing, Fawcett has worked as an independent consultant on nurse team training under the name 'Click Developments'. She holds roles on the boards of health organisations, including as Education Lead & Clinical Advisor for Helpforce, as a Non-Executive Director of Derbyshire Community Health Services, and as a Non-Executive Director on the board of RCNi, which is the publishing house of the Royal College of Nursing.

Fawcett has been involved in the development of two national health care qualifications in the UK:

In 2014 she led the development of the National Care Certificate which certifies workers in the health and social care sector in the UK and is administered by Skills for Care, Health Education England and Skills for Health.

In 2017 she chaired a national steering group which developed the Healthcare Apprenticeship Standards for three different group of healthcare workers in England: Healthcare Support Workers, Senior Healthcare Support Workers and Assistant Practitioners.

=== Recognition and honours ===
Fawcett was awarded Order of the British Empire (OBE) in the Queen's Birthday Honours List 2014 for services to nursing.

She was awarded Honorary Doctor of the University of Derby (HonDUniv) at a Graduation ceremony at Derby Arena in November 2018.
