= Barry Day =

Sir Barry Stuart Day OBE (born 12 June 1953) is the chief executive of the Greenwood Dale Foundation Trust (GDFT). He was formerly headteacher of the Greenwood Dale School.

Day was appointed Officer of the Order of the British Empire (OBE) in the 2007 Birthday Honours and knighted in the 2014 Birthday Honours for services to education. He was appointed one of the National College for School Leadership's National Leaders of Education in October 2007.

In 2008, Day received an honorary degree of Doctor of Education from Nottingham Trent University in recognition of his work to raise the aspirations and attainment of young people in the city of Nottingham, reflecting not only his success in transforming the Greenwood Dale School in Nottingham, but also his broader influence in raising educational standards nationally.
