= Helen Mason (physicist) =

British physicist

Helen Mason OBE
- Born: Helen Elizabeth Mason
- Education: Queen Mary University of London University of London
- Scientific career
- Fields: Physics
- Workplaces: Department of Applied Mathematics and Theoretical Physics, University of Cambridge
- Website: www.damtp.cam.ac.uk/people/h.e.mason/

Helen Elizabeth Mason OBE is a British theoretical physicist at the Department of Applied Mathematics and Theoretical Physics at the University of Cambridge. She holds a Personal Readership in Solar Physics. Helen Mason has been involved in many solar space projects such as Skylab, Yohkoh and the Solar Maximum Mission. She has been working as a co-investigator of the Solar and Heliospheric Observatory project launched in 1995, and more recently on Hinode and the Solar Dynamics Observatory. She is a Fellow of St Edmund's College, Cambridge.

== Educational projects ==
Helen Mason has contributed to a number of outreach projects in collaboration with the Millennium Mathematics Project and is currently leading the Sun|Trek project, an educational resource for teachers and students about the Sun and its effect on the Earth. She has worked with school students in South Africa and India. She has given many talks to schools, astronomy societies and to the public. In 2013, she gave a Friday Evening Discourse on 'Our Dynamic Sun' at the Royal Institution.

== Awards ==
Mason has been named as one of the "Women of Outstanding Achievement of 2010" in recognition of her work in communication within Science, Engineering and Technology (SET). She was appointed Officer of the Order of the British Empire (OBE) in the 2014 Birthday Honours for services to higher education and to women in science, engineering, and technology.

== Publications ==
- O'Dwyer, B., Del Zanna, G. and Mason, H.E., 2014, Response of Hinode XRT to quiet Sun, active region and flare plasma Astron. Astrophys. 561, 20.
- Doschek, G. A., Mariska, J. T., Warren, H. P., Brown, C. M., Culhane, J. L., Hara, H., Watanabe, T., Young, P. R. and Mason, H. E., 2007, Nonthermal Velocities in Solar Active Regions Observed with the Extreme-Ultraviolet Imaging Spectrometer on Hinode Astrophys. J., 667, L109-112
- Dzifkov, E., Kulinov, A., Chifor, C., Mason, H. E., Del Zanna, G., Sylwester, J. and Sylwester, B., 2008, Nonthermal and thermal diagnostics of a solar flare observed with RESIK and RHESSI Astron. Astrophys., 488, 311–321.
- Janardhan, P., Tripathi, D. and Mason, H. E., 2008, The solar wind disappearance event of 11 May 1999: source region evolution Astron. Astrophys., 488, L1-4.
