= Jessica Corner =

British nurse (born 1961)

Dame Jessica Corner DBE FMedSci
- Born: Jessica Lois Corner; 22 March 1961 (age 65); Alderbury, Wiltshire, England, UK
- Citizenship: British
- Occupation: Executive Chair of Research England
- Known for: Research on cancer and palliative care nursing

Academic background
- Education: University of London; King's College London

Academic work
- Discipline: Nursing
- Institutions: University of Nottingham
- Website: UKRI profile

Professor Dame Jessica Lois Corner DBE FMedSci (born 22 March 1961) is a British nurse, academic, educator and author. She is currently the Executive Chair of Research England. She was previously Professor of Cancer and Supportive Care, and Pro-Vice-Chancellor for Research and Knowledge Exchange at the University of Nottingham.

== Career ==
She graduated with a PhD from King's College London in 1990. Originally a nurse, she served as Director of the Centre of Cancer and Palliative Care Studies and Deputy Dean of Nursing at the University of London's Institute of Cancer Research (1996–2008). She is the first nurse to be appointed to a chair at the institute.

Corner was Dean (from 2010) of the Faculty of Health Sciences, and Professor (from 2008) of Cancer and Palliative Care at the University of Southampton.

On 21 July 2015, it was announced that Corner had been appointed as Pro-Vice-Chancellor for Research and Knowledge Exchange at The University of Nottingham, taking up her post on 1 January 2016. At Nottingham she was the driving force behind their 'Beacons of Excellence' which proved highly controversial.

On 6 July 2022, it was announced by UK Research and Innovation that Corner had been appointed Executive Chair of Research England, taking up her post on 1 October 2022.

She was elected chair of the Council of Deans of Health and is a member of the Nursing and Care Quality Forum. She has written three books and written or edited dozens of papers for academic journals. She was a member of Higher Education Funding Council for England's Research Excellence Framework 2014 and 2021 allied health professions, dentistry, nursing and pharmacy sub-panels.

== Awards and recognition ==
Corner was appointed a Dame Commander of the Order of the British Empire (DBE) in the 2014 Birthday Honours for services to healthcare research and education. Corner was elected as a fellow of the UK Academy of Medical Sciences in 2015. On election, her citation included that she 'pioneered the first randomised trials of nurse led care in cancer, now recognized worldwide as landmark studies in advanced practice nursing'. Corner was elected to the Council of the academy in 2018 for a three-year term, and chairs an academy selection committee. In 2018, Corner was named as one of the 70 most influential nurses in the first 70 years of the NHS.
