= Polly Roy =

Virologist

Polly Roy OBE
- Born: Calcutta, India
- Scientific career
- Institutions: London School of Hygiene and Tropical Medicine

Polly Roy OBE was a professor and Chair of Virology at The London School of Hygiene and Tropical Medicine. She attended a number of schools which included Columbia University Medical School, Rutgers University, University of Alabama, and University of Oxford. In 2001 she became a part of The London School of Hygiene and Tropical Medicine and, along with being the chair of Virology, is also the co-organiser of the medical microbiology course. The virus that she has dedicated most of her career to is Bluetongue disease that affects sheep and cattle. She became interested in this virus after attending a symposium and was intrigued by the fact that not much was known about the virus that was causing such a nasty and sometimes fatal disease.

== Education ==
Roy went to Presidency College in Calcutta, India, where she was born. Thereafter, she received a scholarship to study at New York University where she received her PhD in Molecular Virology. Whilst studying biological sciences she met biologist Sol Spiegelman. Roy then spent three years in a post-doctoral position in RNA Virology at Waksman Institute of Microbiology at Rutgers University. After her post-doctoral work, she went to the University of Alabama at Birmingham to begin her own RNA research group. She became a professor at University of Alabama at Birmingham in 1987. Roy then received the Fogarty Fellowship at the University of Oxford in 1997 where she established a second virology lab. In 2001 Roy moved to The Department of Pathogen Molecular Biology at the London School of Hygiene and Tropical Medicine as a Virology professor where she leads a research groups.

== Research ==
Throughout her career, Roy has improved understanding on basic molecular, and structural biology, replication and the transmission of a variety viruses.

Her research has led to advances in the development of improved diagnostic assays, more efficacious virus-like protein (VLP) vaccines, vaccines for Bluetongue and African Horse sickness virus (AHSV) and the possibility of other therapeutics relating to these diseases.

Roy's research has been published in multiple highly acclaimed journals alongside contributing to several published books as a guest writer/editor.

Roy's most recent research included gaining a clearer understanding around the blue tongue virus at a molecular level, the potential for developing vaccines for Bluetongue virus and the African Horse sickness virus, RNA-RNA interactions and packaging, cell entry and transcription activation of non-enveloped dsRNA viruses and defining the cis and trans acting factors in the assembly of the Bluetongue virus.

== Research interests ==
- RNA Virology
- Viral Genetics
- Protein Function & Capsid Assembly
- Replication of Segmented Genome & Packaging
- Virus Trafficking in Host Cell
- Technology Development & Generation of Particulate Vaccines

== Contributions to our understanding of Bluetongue Virus ==
- Viral Structure
- Viral Assembly
- RNA Replication
- Virus Release
- Supervised Post-doctoral & Post-graduate Researchers
- Published close to 300 Research Papers
- Served on Many Different Scientific Organizations, Committees, & Boards
- Organized International Conferences
- In 2006 Dr. Polly Roy was elected a Fellow of the Academy of Medical Sciences for Conference on Viral Assembly
- Delivered a talk at Women in Health 2018 Lecture series - How a virus works: a journey

== Honours and awards ==
- Granted One Health, One World Award for contributions to science popularisation (2022)
- Recipient, Jean Cohen Lecturer (2022)
- Officer of the Order of the British Empire (OBE) in the 2014 Birthday Honours, for services to Virus Research
- Elected Fellow of the Society of Biology (2014)
- Senior Investigator Award from the Wellcome Trust (2012)
- 'Innovator of the Year' Finalist, Biotechnology and Biological Sciences Research Council (BBSRC) (2012)
- The Indian Science Congress General President's Gold Medal (2012)
