= TouchBionics =

Touch EMAS (Edinburgh Modular Arm System) is a biomedical engineering company based in Edinburgh, Scotland, specializing in the development of upper limb prosthetic technologies. It was founded by David Gow and was the first spin out company from Britain's National Health Service. Its intellectual property was based on the work of David Gow and his team at the Bioengineering Centre, Princess Margaret Rose Hospital, Edinburgh. It was awarded a SMART award in June 2002 to develop its articulating prosthetic hand which later became the i-Limb Hand. It received start up funding from the Edinburgh based Archangels syndicate in March 2003. It has been described as a world leader in upper limb prosthetic technologies.

In 2005 the company rebranded as TouchBionics. It employs more than 120 people in Scotland, Germany and the United States.

It was sold to Össur in 2016 for £25.5 million.
