= Nicholas Crafts =

British economist (1949–2023)

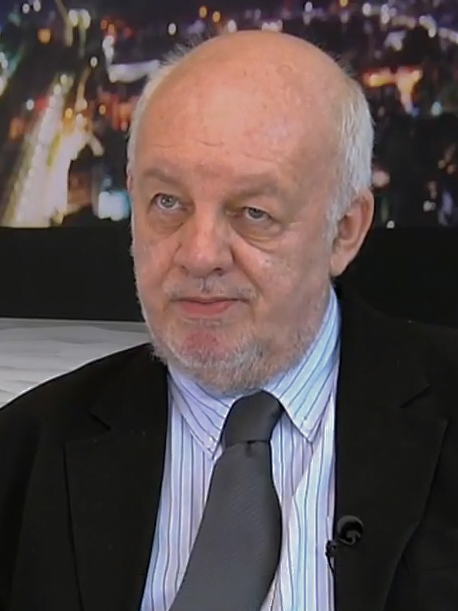
Crafts in 2012

Nicholas Francis Robert Crafts CBE (9 March 1949 – 6 October 2023) was a British economist who was known for his contributions to economic history, in particular on the Industrial Revolution.

He was Professor of Economic History at the University of Sussex Business School from 2019 until his death, Professor of Economics and Economic History at the University of Warwick from 2005 to 2019, and Professor of Economic History at London School of Economics and Political Science (LSE) between 1995 and 2005.

His main fields of interest were the British economy in the last 200 years, European economic growth, historical data on the British economy, the Industrial Revolution and international income distribution, especially with reference to the Human Development Index. He produced a substantial body of papers for academic journals, the British government and international institutions such as the International Monetary Fund.

During the 1980s Crafts argued that during the Industrial Revolution an abnormally high (compared to countries which industrialised later) proportion of the British economy came to be devoted to industry and international trade, and that the British economy always tended to grow slowly. When Britain was overtaken by Germany and the USA - both larger countries - in the late nineteenth century, this was not because of any deceleration of British performance.

== Early life ==
Crafts attended Brunts Grammar School, Mansfield. He was a student at Trinity College, Cambridge, and graduated with a BA in economics in 1970.

== Career summary ==
- From 1971 to 1972 he was a lecturer in economic history at the University of Exeter.
- From 1974 to 1976 he was visiting assistant professor of economics at the University of California, Berkeley.
- From 1977 to 1986 he was a fellow and praelector in economics at University College, Oxford.
- From 1987 to 1988 he was professor of economic history at the University of Leeds and from 1988 to 1995 he was professor of economic history, at the University of Warwick.
- From 1995 to 2005 he was professor of economic history, at the London School of Economics.
- In 2005 he rejoined the University of Warwick, where he lectured in economic history.

Crafts was appointed Commander of the Order of the British Empire (CBE) in the 2014 Birthday Honours for services to economics.

== Personal life and death ==
Crafts was born on 9 March 1949 in Nottingham, England. He died from sepsis on 6 October 2023, at the age of 74.

=== Crafts and the British Industrial Revolution ===
Crafts, along with Knick Harley, provided a very influential reinterpretation of the British industrial revolution in the 1980s. They measured the growth rates of various industries, and of the different sectors of the economy, in order to measure the growth of the British economy during the industrial revolution. The found that the overall rate of growth was much lower than had previously been believed, and was heavily concentrated in two industries: cotton and iron. A few historians (though not Crafts himself) used these figures to suggest that it was inappropriate to describe the period as an ‘industrial revolution’. Most, however, argued that although growth rates had been slower and steadier during the industrial revolution than previously imagined, the idea of an ‘industrial revolution’ was still valid.

== Selected publications ==
- Edited with Gianni Toniolo. Economic Growth in Europe since 1945, Cambridge University Press, 1996, ISBN 0521496276
- 1987, "Economic History," The New Palgrave: A Dictionary of Economics, v. 2, pp. 37–42.
- 1985, "British Economic Growth during the Industrial Revolution"
