= Anna Taylor (nutritionist) =

British nutritionist (fl. 2026)

Dame Anna Kim Taylor DBE OBE is a British nutritionist.

== Early life and education ==
Taylor has a BA in geography and anthropology (1993) from the University of Durham and an MSc in human nutrition (1994) from the London School of Hygiene and Tropical Medicine.

== Career ==
Taylor worked as head of hunger reduction at Save The Children from November 1999 to October 2009, and then as a senior nutrition advisor at the Department for International Development from November 2009 to June 2015, before joining the Food Foundation in June 2015. As of 2026 she is executive director of the Food Foundation.

In 2017 she became a member of the London Food Board, set up to advise the mayor of London and the Greater London Authority on food issues affecting Londoners. She was chief independent advisor to Henry Dimbleby during his work on the National Food Strategy which was published in 2021.

== Awards and recognition ==
Taylor was appointed an Officer of the Order of the British Empire (OBE) in the 2014 Birthday Honours " For services to Tackling Global Undernutrition" and a Dame Commander of the Order of the British Empire (DBE) in the 2026 Birthday Honours "For services to Reforming the Food System".
