= George Hosking =

- Born: George Dunne Cameron Hosking; 27 December 1943 (age 82); Bowmore, Isle of Islay, Scotland
- Awards: OBE

Academic background
- Education: Glasgow University, London University, Birmingham University, Nottingham Trent University

Academic work
- Institutions: WAVE Trust (founder)
- Main interests: Economist, accountant, psychologist, and clinical criminologist
- Notable works: The strategic management of costs (1993); Violence and what to do about it (2005, with Ita Walsh); International experience of early intervention for children, young people and their families (2010, with Ita Walsh); Conception to age 2 - the age of opportunity (2013, with Sally Burlington and Ita Walsh)
- Notable ideas: to solve deep-seated problems you must first understand the root causes, then tackle those root causes

George Dunne Cameron Hosking (born 27 December 1943 in Bowmore, Isle of Islay) is a British Quaker, economist, accountant, psychologist, and clinical criminologist who founded WAVE Trust in 1996.

== Education ==
He graduated with an Honours M.A. degree in Political Economy with Economic History from Glasgow University in 1966; qualified as a Chartered Management Accountant in 1969 (later becoming a Fellow of the Chartered Institute of Management Accountants, FCMA); graduated with a First Class Honours B.Sc. degree in psychology from Birkbeck College, University of London, in 1983; with a PG Diploma in Clinical Criminology from Birmingham University in 1998; and with an Advanced PG Diploma in the Management of Psychological Trauma from Nottingham Trent University in 2000.

In 2022, WAVE Trust attracted national attention when it was revealed that the charity did not consider child sexual abuse to be an adverse childhood experience.
