= E-Tabs =

Software companies of the United Kingdom

- Industry: Market Research
- Founded: 1993
- Headquarters: London, England, UK
- Products: Report Automation, PowerPoint Charting, PowerPoint Infographics, Market Research Dashboards
- Services: Report Automation, Online Reporting, Data Viz Consultation
- Website: e-tabs.com

E-Tabs is a software company with headquarters in London, England.

The company develops and delivers data visualization and report automation software and services tailored for the market research industry. The company was established in 1993 as ISPC by one of the original founders of Quantime- a specialist Data Processing software. Following a management buyout in 1999 ISPC was rebranded as E-Tabs.

E-Tabs software automatically populates charts, graphs and reports in PowerPoint, Excel, Word and HTML. Their products and services are used in market research as research projects often involve reporting work. Automating charts, graphs and reports improves accuracy and prevents time and resources being wasted on data entry

Report automation is beneficial for projects with repetitive elements, tracking studies, ongoing studies, one-off multi-segment studies across brands or regions, and concept testing studies.

== Awards ==
- Two-time winners of the MRS / ASC Award for Technology Innovation and Effectiveness – more than any other organisation
- Five-time nominees for MRS / ASC Award for Technology Innovation and Effectiveness – more than double that of any other organisation
- Winner of the MRS Operations Award for ‘Best Support Services’ for their Dashboard Design Service.
- Finalist for the MRS Operations Award for ‘Best Support Services’ for their Bureau Reporting Service.
- Queen's Awards for Enterprise: Innovation
