= WAVE Trust =

British charity

- Worldwide Alternatives to Violence
- Formation: 1996
- Type: International educational charity

WAVE Trust (Worldwide Alternatives to Violence) was formed in 1996 and registered as an international educational charity with the Charity Commission for England and Wales under Number 1080189 in 1999. The charity is dedicated to reducing the key root causes of interpersonal violence: child neglect and maltreatment. The method used is a business strategy approach to identify and then tackle these problems at root cause level.

WAVE's fundamental message is that most family violence and maltreatment can be prevented by known, economically viable programs to break damaging family cycles. The research identifies and actively promotes UK adoption of global best practice methods and programs to address violence, e.g. the Nurse-Family Partnership. Research also identifies two early conditions as antidotes to the development of violent personalities: attunement between carers and babies, and the development of empathy in the child.

In 2022, the Scottish Parliament’s cross-party group (CPG) on the prevention and healing of adverse childhood experiences (ACEs), established with input from the Wave Trust, experienced a series of resignations. Those who stepped down included developmental psychologist Dr Suzanne Zeedyk, former and current convenors Sue Webber MSP (Conservative) and Rona Mackay MSP (SNP), and SNP MSP Karen Adams.The resignations followed concerns about the group’s association with the Wave Trust and its "70/30 campaign", which aimed to reduce ACEs by 70 percent by 2030. Critics questioned the campaign’s approach and highlighted the exclusion of childhood sexual abuse from the group’s definition of ACEs.Dr Zeedyk emphasized the need for a broader approach to ACEs and raised doubts about both the feasibility and rationale of the 70 percent reduction target. Other departing MSPs cited governance issues and a lack of consultation with survivors of sexual abuse. Following the resignations, the Scottish Parliament’s Standards Committee sought clarification regarding the group’s leadership and organisational structure before reviewing its status as a registered cross-party group.

== Activities ==
WAVE works with police, government departments, academics and other voluntary organizations to improve understanding of the most effective strategies and policies for reducing violence and child maltreatment. The charity also delivers therapeutic programs for violent offenders in prison and after release. In 2008 WAVE cooperated with the Centre for Social Justice and the Smith Institute to write and publish the booklet Early Intervention: Good Parents, Great Kids, Better Citizens. This publication calls on all political parties to unite around a long-term commitment to the policy of Primary Prevention.

== See also ==
- Attachment theory
- Child abuse
- Child Development Index
- Complex post-traumatic stress disorder
- Domestic violence
- Emotional dysregulation
- International Save the Children Alliance
- Sociology of the family
- Youth studies
