= Derek Myers =

American journalist

- Born: Derek Joel Myers; Ohio, U.S.
- Occupations: Journalist, investigative reporter
- Known for: Investigative journalism, First Amendment advocacy
- Notable work: Reporting on government corruption and police misconduct

Derek Joel Myers is an American journalist. Myers most notably spent 35 days in jail for fabricated charges filed against him by a police chief in Ohio. The case was investigated by the FBI, which led to Myers being exonerated and the settlement of a $2.5 million federal civil rights lawsuit in his favor.

== Early life and education ==
Myers was born in Ohio to Dorraine Downing, a home health nurse, and Richard Myers. His parents separated when he was five. Myers grew up as an only child in Jeffersonville, Ohio, raised by his maternal grandmother.

== Career ==
=== Public service ===
As a teenager, Myers joined "The Pound Posse," advocating to ban gas chambers in Ohio animal shelters. Their efforts culminated in the passage of Senate Bill 164, signed by Governor Mike DeWine in 2023.

In 2020, Myers lobbied successfully for the return of a police K-9, Harry, to his former handler, Rob Morningstar, following Morningstar's resignation from the Circleville Police Department.

Myers is an advocate for homelessness prevention and diabetes awareness.

=== Journalism ===
Myers began his journalism career at WCHO-FM and later became a television reporter. He worked at WCJB-TV in Florida, where he focused on police corruption and government accountability. In 2015, he joined WVLA-TV in Baton Rouge but was fired after questioning Senator David Vitter about a scandal.

In 2017, Myers launched the Justice Network's Columbus affiliate, WDEM-CD, and in 2019, he founded the Scioto Valley Guardian news website. By 2020, the Guardian expanded with a Washington D.C. bureau, and Myers became a White House Correspondent.

=== Legal challenges ===
Myers, in one notable case, was jailed for 35 days on fabricated charges by a New Holland, Ohio police chief. The FBI later investigated, leading to Myers' exoneration and a $2.5 million civil rights lawsuit settlement.

In 2022, Myers won a landmark lawsuit against the Chillicothe Police Department, changing public records law in Ohio. He also successfully sued for courtroom access during the Pike County Massacre trial.

In 2023, Myers was arrested at a nursing home fire scene but was released after the charges were dismissed by the Sheriff.
