= Ron Hosking =

Australian rules footballer

Personal information
- Full name: Ron Hosking
- Born: September 18, 1943 (age 83)
- Original team: Lismore
- Height: 180 cm (5 ft 11 in)
- Weight: 85 kg (187 lb)
- Position: Halfback

Playing career^{1}
Years	Club	Games (Goals)
1964–68	Geelong	70 (0)
- ^{1} Playing statistics correct to the end of 1968.

Ron Hosking (born 18 September 1943) is a former Australian rules footballer who played with Geelong in the Victorian Football League (VFL).
