= John Fox (footballer) =

Australian rules footballer

Personal information
- Full name: John Fox
- Born: 28 September 1940
- Original team: Marrar
- Height: 188 cm (6 ft 2 in)
- Weight: 84 kg (185 lb)
- Position: Wing / Half forward / Halfback

Playing career^{1}
Years	Club	Games (Goals)
1960–65	Geelong	60 (7)
- ^{1} Playing statistics correct to the end of 1965.

John Fox (born 28 September 1940) is a former Australian rules footballer who played with Geelong in the Victorian Football League (VFL). Fox lived in Lismore on the Western Plains of Victoria whilst playing with Geelong where he was employed at Stachan & co, Woolbrokers and Stock and Station Agents. He later played and coached with the Lismore Football Club.
