= David Gow =

David James Gow CBE (born 1957) is the inventor of the I-LIMB prosthetic hand. He was made an honorary Doctor of Science in November 2018 by the University of Edinburgh.

== Biography ==
He was born in Dumfries in 1957 and was educated at Breconbeds School, Kirtlebridge, Annan Academy and the University of Edinburgh. He studied Mechanical Engineering from 1975 to 1979, graduating with BSc (Honours) in Engineering Science. He then worked for a year at Ferranti (Scotland) a defence contractor in Edinburgh. In January 1981, he began a research post at the University of Edinburgh lasting until 1984 when he transferred to the National Health Service (NHS). He managed the Rehabilitation Technology Services for NHS Lothian and was based at the SMART Centre in Edinburgh.

== Career ==
He began a programme of research activities in the field of upper limb prosthetics. In 1998, he fitted a fellow Scot, Campbell Aird with an electrical arm prosthesis containing the world's first electrical shoulder. In 2002, he founded and spun out the first company from the NHS, Touch EMAS Ltd and became its first CEO. He invented the i-limb and ProDigits partial hand system (later i-limb digits, now i-digits). He and his team from the company (which became Touch Bionics in 2005) won the MacRobert Award from the Royal Academy of Engineering in 2008.

He is a Chartered Engineer and a Fellow of the Institute of Physics and Engineering in Medicine and the Royal Academy of Engineering.

Gow was appointed Commander of the Order of the British Empire (CBE) in the 2014 Birthday Honours for services to upper limb prosthetics.

David retired from the NHS in April 2015.
