= Faʻala =

Village in Samoa

Coordinates: 13°45′30″S 172°17′43″W

Faʻala is a village on the island of Savaiʻi in Samoa. It is situated on the south coast of the island in the district of Palauli and the electoral district of Palauli 3. The population is 932.
