= Gibril Faal =

British-Gambian business executive

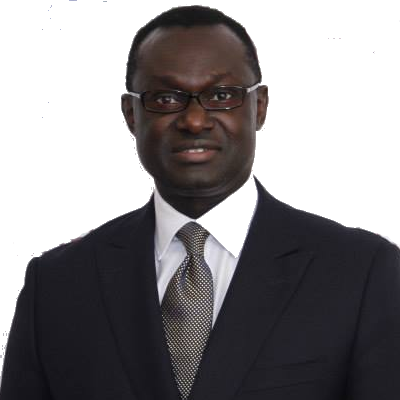
- Born: 10 October 1967 (age 59)

Academic background
- Education: University of London; University of Westminster; South Bank University (now called London South Bank University)*; University of East London; University of North London (now part of London Metropolitan University

Gibril Faal OBE (born 10 October 1967) is a British-Gambian business and development executive. In 2014, he was appointed OBE in the Queen's Birthday Honours List for services to international development, following a nomination by the Department for International Development (DfID). He is a visiting professor in practice at London School of Economics (Institute of Global Affairs). He was one of the global leaders who spoke at the 19 September 2016 UN Summit on Refugees and Migrants, joining select presidents, prime ministers and institution leaders to address the question of 'International cooperation'. Gibril serves as technical expert in the consultations and negotiations for the Global Compact on Migration. He was the Grand Rapporteur of the Tenth Summit of the Global Forum on Migration and Development (GFMD) in Berlin in June 2017. He co-moderated Common Space of the Eighth GFMD Summit in Istanbul in October 2015. He co-chaired the seventh GFMD) in Stockholm in May 2014. In 2013, he delivered two keynote addresses at the United Nations General Assembly. He was selected to speak on behalf of global civil society and joined the UN Secretary General to open the High Level Dialogue on Migration and International Development.

== Education ==
A social entrepreneur and multi-disciplinary practitioner with an eclectic professional background, Gibril was educated at Serekunda Primary School in the Gambia (1973–79) and attended grammar school and Sixth Form at Gambia High School (1979–86). He then studied at five universities in London. He has a Combined Honours bachelor's degree in law, Finance & Management and postgraduate degrees in Development Studies and Environmental Sciences. He also had professional training in Ethical Investment, Economic History, Policy Analysis, Transport and Urban Management, Environmental and Quality Management.

== Business and social enterprise ==
Gibril has been a director of GK Partners since 2004 – advising socially responsible businesses and social enterprises. Through its "Access to Finance" and "Access to Property" programmes, GK Partners has helped companies raise millions of pounds of investment from ethical finance sources. From 2001 to 2004, Gibril was one of a small team of the people who developed a social enterprise business support framework in the UK through a programme funded by the Department of Trade and Industry (now called Department for Business, Innovation and Skills). Their work included the development of social enterprise business models, different forms of social investment schemes and legislation for Community Interest Companies in the Companies (Audit, Investigations and Community Enterprise) Act 2004.

Gibril established his first business in 1993 supporting SMEs, social enterprises, charities and voluntary organisations. He worked in corporate law, business and financial management, organisational development and quality assurance. Since the early 1990s, he has directly supported hundreds of companies and organisations across a wide and diverse range of sectors. In 2003, he received special commendation from the board of the then London Business Support Network.

He was a special adviser to the Institute of Islamic Banking and Insurance (IIBI), helping them gain charitable status as a learned association. He designed an "Access to Islamic Finance" (A2IF) training programme delivered by IIBI. In 2009, he convened and chaired the first A2IF conference in the UK that brought together the SME, ethical finance, business angel and Islamic finance sectors. Between 1990 and 1993, Gibril was a lecturer and tutor at various private colleges in London, teaching business law, accounting and management. He is a present or past member of several professional and academic bodies including the Chartered Institute of Arbitrators, Chartered Management Institute, Chartered Institute of Logistics and Transport, Institution of Environmental Sciences and the Royal Society of Arts.

== International development ==
Gibril is a board member and vice chair of Bond (UK's platform for NGOs working in international development). He also served on the boards of multimillion-dollar funds that invest in developing countries, including DFID’s Global Poverty Action Fund and the EC-UN Joint Migration and Development Initiative. He is currently the Interim Executive Director of the Africa-Europe Diaspora Development Platform (ADEPT). He has been involved with African Foundation for Development (AFFORD) since 1997 and served as chairman of the charity for a decade. AFFORD is a pioneering diaspora organisation that focused on enhancing the formal and informal role of diasporas in the development of countries of origin or heritage. It has devised and delivered innovative job creation schemes in Africa. Since 2000, Gibril has been applying the lessons of social enterprise, ethical finance and urban regeneration in the UK, to international development challenges.

Between 2000 and 2005, Gibril was an associate lecturer with The Open University, teaching on the MSc course in Global Development Management. In 2003, he founded RemitAid™ as a programme to transform remittances into a sustainable form of international development finance using tax reliefs and other macroeconomic policies. In 2005, the UK held the presidency of the EU and chaired of the G8 simultaneously. The Blair government set up the Commission for Africa. Gibril, together with others such as Trevor Manuel (then South African Finance Minister) was on the panel that advised the Chancellor of the Exchequer, Gordon Brown on the agenda for the Gleneagles G8 Summit. On 2 July 2005, on behalf of AFFORD, Gibril hosted the late Nobel Laureate Wangari Maathai as guest speaker at the African Diaspora and Development Day (AD3). Prof Maathai later became a supporter of the RemitAid™ proposal. In 2008, Gibril organised the introduction of the Mo Ibrahim Foundation to Francophone Africa. The event in Dakar was attended by Dr Ibrahim and four board members of the Foundation.

In 2006, he undertook the independent evaluation of the non-academic impact of University of Oxford's Centre on Migration, Policy and Society (COMPAS). Gibril continues to act as an expert adviser to governments across the world as well as international and civil society organisations. He works in collaboration with agencies and institutions such as the Swiss Agency for Development and Cooperation (SDC), Deutsche Gesellschaft für Internationale Zusammenarbeit (GIZ), International Organization for Migration (IOM) and the EC Directorate General International Cooperation and Development (Devco). He leads professional assignments on policy development and international negotiations. His recent work in global policy advocacy was in relation to the Financing for Development (FfD) and Sustainable Development Goals (SDG) negotiations. He is a Senior Research Associate with the Foreign Policy Centre (FPC). Since 2007, Gibril has been hosting private policy briefings with ministers in successive governments, senior politicians from all major parties as well as diplomats, academics and CEOs of businesses and NGOs.

In 2013, he published a handbook entitled Understanding and Influencing Policy: Advocacy Handbook for Diaspora and Small Organisations Working in International Development. Every year, he delivers dozens of keynote speeches on different aspects of development at global forums. In both 2006 and 2015, he was on the high-level panels on Migration and Development at the European Development Days. Gibril has presented expert papers at institutions such as the United Nations, World Bank, Commonwealth Secretariat, United Nations Economic Commission for Africa, Royal United Services Institute for Defence and Security Studies, Chatham House, Wilton Park and the universities of Oxford and Cambridge.

== Public service ==
Since 1998, Gibril had been appointed to various public functions in the UK by the Home Secretary, the Lord Chancellor, the Chancellor of the Exchequer, and the Secretary of State for International Development. He served as Treasurer of the Panel of Independent custody visitor in Lambeth (Brixton). He was part of the group that advised both the Home Secretary and Metropolitan Police Commissioner on putting custody visiting on a legislative footing and giving responsibility to Police Authorities. This led to the promulgation of Section 51 of the Police Reform Act 2002. In 2004, he was appointed Justice of the Peace and part-time magistrate in the London Commission Area within Her Majesty's Court and Tribunal Service. He has been a sitting magistrate for over a decade in courts in Wimbledon, Richmond, Lavender Hill and Kingston.

Between 1988 and 1997, Gibril was a volunteer youth leader at Pedro Youth Club in Hackney, running the Naataangeh Study Group. He led research projects, wrote papers and ran weekly workshops on African and diaspora history and anthropology. In 1993, he published a paper on "Blacks of the Pacific: African Origins of Melanesian Peoples". In 2006 at the Conference of Intellectuals and the African Diaspora (CIAD II) held in Salvador de Bahia, Brazil (organised by the African Union, UNESCO and the Brazilian Government), he made a keynote presentation on "A New Definition and Classification of the African Diaspora". This informed his 2010 Chatham House presentation on "Historical & Developmental Perspectives on the African Diaspora".

In 2010/11, Gibril was a patron of the National Portrait Gallery, advising NPG and supporting the fundraising effort to acquire the 17a33 painting (portrait) of the freed slave Job Ben Solomon. Gibril has been researching this subject since the late 1980s. In 2007, as part of the bicentenary of the abolition of the slave trade in the UK, he designed a historical education programme on "slave-scholars" and wrote a paper entitled "Ayuba Sulayman Jallow: The Life of a Gambian Slave-Scholar". Gibril assisted dozens of start-ups to become effective contributors in the cultural and creative industries sector. These include Omnibus Clapham (a multipurpose music and arts centre), Yaram Arts (promoters of African music, art and cultural heritage), Hangar Arts Trust (a centre for circus, acrobatic and aerial arts) and Snow-Camp (a charity that uses snow sports to support inner city young people). Gibril also acts as technical adviser to researchers in the disability arts movement and co-founded the Edward Lear Foundation.

Gibril has been actively involved in public service and campaigns for social justice all his life. In 1995, he wrote a socio-legal paper examining whether Female Genital Mutilation (FGM) is a form of torture as defined in international law. He later served as a trustee of Foundation for Women's Health, Research and Development FORWARD (a pioneering anti-FGM charity) from 2007 to 2014. As a teenager in the early 1980s, he was involved in youth and student mobilisations in Gambia. He also gave lectures in support of the work of the Gambia Anti-Apartheid Society. In 1986, he was appointed trainee Clerk of Court at the Supreme Court of the Gambia, where he worked for a puisne judge. In 1987, he became a Clerk at Kanifing Magistrates’ Court and progressed to manage the semi-rural Brikama Magistrates’ Court, working with a travelling magistrate. Beyond his formal multidisciplinary roles, Gibril provides informal advice and guidance to government officials and leaders in the public, private and civil society sectors around the world.
