= I-LIMB Hand =

The i-LIMB Hand is the brand name of world's first commercially available bionic hand invented by David Gow and his team at the Bioengineering Centre of the Princess Margaret Rose Hospital in Edinburgh, and manufactured by Touch Bionics. The articulating prosthetic hand has individually powered digits and thumb and has a choice of grips. The i-Limb Hand offers full hand solutions in addition to partial hand solutions. It was launched in Vancouver in July 2007. i-LIMB Hand won the Limbless Association's Prosthetic Product Innovation Award for 2008, was listed at number fourteen in the TIME's list of the Top 50 Best Inventions of 2008, and Touch EMAS/Touch Bionics was awarded The Queen's Award for Enterprise: Innovation (Technology) (2010) for the i-LIMB Hand.

== How It Works ==
The i-LIMB Hand is controlled through the use of myoelectric signals, which uses the muscle signals in the patient's residual arm to move the i-LIMB Hand around. Electrodes are placed at two pre-determined muscle sites. The electrodes pick up the muscle signals when the patient contracts his/her muscles. These signals are then sent to a microprocessor which causes the device to move. The i-LIMB Hand has up to four different muscle triggers. The user is able to assign a grip to move the device to a certain position. These muscle triggers include:

1. `hold open’; This option uses the open signal for a certain amount of time.
2. `double impulse’; This option uses two quick open signals once the hand is opened completely.
3. `triple impulse’ This option uses three quick open signals once the hand is opened completely.
4. `co-contraction’ This allows the device to contract the open and close muscles at the same time.

== Products ==
=== Whole Hand Solutions ===
Whole Hand Solutions include i-LIMB ultra and the i-LIMB revolution. The i-LIMB ultra provides features including a powered-rotating thumb and grip chips™, which allows the user to communicate through bluetooth for immediate grip access. The i-LIMB revolution offers digit-by-digit grip strength and allows the user to customize grip strengths. Both whole hand solutions offer mobile device apps, giving the user access to different grip patterns.

=== Partial Hand Solutions ===
Partial Hand Solutions are offered to individuals with missing fingers or partial hands. These missing fingers can be replaced by i-LIMB digits.
