= Jill Maben =

British nurse

Jill Maben OBE
- Occupations: Professor of Health Services Research and Nursing
- Known for: Research on nursing and nursing policy

Academic background
- Education: UCL; King's College London; University of Southampton

Academic work
- Discipline: Nursing
- Sub-discipline: Nursing Policy
- Institutions: University of Surrey; Murdoch University
- Website: https://www.surrey.ac.uk/people/jill-mabenhttps://www.surrey.ac.uk/people/jill-maben

Jill Elizabeth Maben OBE is a British nurse and academic. She is currently professor of health services research and nursing at the University of Surrey and visiting professor of nursing at Murdoch University, Perth, Australia.

== Education ==
Maben qualified as a Registered Nurse at Addenbrooke's Hospital, Cambridge, leaving the profession after 2 years to study for a BA in history at University College London. Maben returned to nursing gaining an MSc in nursing from King's College London (1996) and PhD from University of Southampton (2003).

== Career ==
On completing her PhD, Maben undertook a post-doctoral fellowship at the London School of Hygiene and Tropical Medicine. In 2007, Maben joined the National Nursing Research Unit at King's College London as senior research fellow and deputy director. She was appointed director of the National Nursing Research Unit in January 2011. Maben was awarded her personal chair in nursing in September 2011. Maben joined the University of Surrey in September 2017 as professor of health services research and nursing, and lead for Healthcare Workforce, Organisation and Wellbeing Research.

== Research ==
Maben's research interests include nursing and healthcare workforce, improving care quality and measuring patient experience. She is known for her evaluation of patient and staff experiences and safety outcomes of a move to 100% single hospital bedrooms. Maben lead the first national evaluation of Schwartz Centre Rounds in the UK.

== Awards and recognition ==
Maben was awarded an OBE in the 2014 Queen's Birthday Honours List for services to nursing and healthcare. She is a Fellow of the Royal College of Surgeons in Ireland Faculty of Nursing and Midwifery ad eundem (2018). In 2013, Maben was in the Health Services Journal Top 100 Leaders, and was also included on the Health Services Journal's inaugural list of Most Inspirational Women in Healthcare the same year. Maben was appointed a National Institute for Health Research (NIHR) Senior Investigator in March 2021.

== Personal life ==
Maben is married and lives in London, UK.
