= Maben Airport =

Coordinates: 42°16′20″N 074°23′39″W

- IATA: none; ICAO: none; FAA LID: N00

Summary
- Airport type: Public
- Owner: Dr. Wayne Maben, MD
- Location: Lexington / Prattsville, New York
- Elevation AMSL: 1,800 ft / 549 m
- Interactive map of Maben Airport

Runways
Direction	Length		Surface
Direction	ft	m	Surface
3/21	4,000	1,219	Turf/gravel

Statistics (2002)
- Aircraft operations: 3,650
- Based aircraft: 10
- Source: Federal Aviation Administration

Maben Airport (FAA LID: N00) is a public-use airport located in Prattsville, in Greene County, New York, United States. It is privately owned by Dr. Wayne Maben, M.D. and was founded in 1948 by his father, Robert Maben. It is currently closed indefinitely.

== Facilities and aircraft ==
Maben Airport covers an area of 5 acres (2.0 ha) which contains one turf and gravel runway (3/21) measuring 4,000 x 50 ft (1,219 x 15 m).

For the 12-month period ending August 2, 2002, the airport had 3,650 aircraft operations: 96% general aviation and 4% military. During that period there were 10 aircraft based at this airport, 100% of which were single-engine.
