= CCW =

CCW may refer to:

- Counterclockwise

== Organizations ==
- Catholic College Wodonga, a Catholic school in Wodonga, Victoria, Australia
- Center on Conscience & War, an American pacifist non-government organization
- Co-operative Central Wholesale, an American consumer cooperative supply organization
- Countryside Council for Wales, a Welsh wildlife and landscaping governmental agency
- Consumer Council for Water, a non-departmental public body which represents the interests of water consumers in England and Wales

== Sports leagues ==
- Celebrity Championship Wrestling, short-lived television reality program featuring Hulk Hogan
- Continental Championship Wrestling a professional wrestling promotion in Southern Alabama, Northern Florida that closed in 1990
- Coastal Championship Wrestling, a professional wrestling promotion in Coral Springs, Florida founded un 2004

== Technical terminology ==
- connect component workbench
- Channel command word, a specialized I/O instruction on IBM mainframes
- Coherent CW, a variant of CW radiocommunication used in amateur radio
- COM callable wrapper, in Microsoft Component Object Model and .NET interoperability
- Computer Combination Weigher – multihead weigher build by Ishida.

== Military and weaponry ==
- Carrying a concealed weapon, carrying a concealed handgun or other weapon in public
- Chinese Civil War, internal struggle for control of China, 1927–1950
- Convention on Certain Conventional Weapons, a 1983 international treaty prohibiting weapons considered to be excessively injurious or indiscriminate

== Other uses ==
- CCW (album), an album by Hugh Cornwell
- Cowell Airport, IATA airport code "CCW"

== See also ==
- C2W
- CW (disambiguation)
- CWW (disambiguation)
- C (disambiguation)
- W (disambiguation)
- CWC (disambiguation)
- WCC (disambiguation)
