= CWW =

CWW may refer to:

- Camp Walt Whitman, Piermont, New Hampshire, USA; a summer camp
- Chak Waraichanwala railway station (rail station code: CWW), Pakistan
- Corowa Airport (IATA airport code: CWW; ICAO airport code: YCOR;), Corowa, New South Wales, Australia.
- Canair Cargo (ICAO airline code: CWW;), an airline of Canada; see List of defunct airlines of Canada
- Children Without Worms, a global program of the Task Force for Global Health
- Cable & Wireless Worldwide plc; a British multinational telecom company
- Columbia Walla Walla Railroad, in the state of Washington, USA; see List of Washington (state) railroads
- Claymore S&P Global Water ETF (stock ticker: CWW), see List of Canadian exchange-traded funds
- Computing With Words engine (CWW); a component for perceptual computing using Type-2 fuzzy sets and systems
- Cruciform wing weapon, see Cruciform wing
- Contaminated Water Warning, a warning code in the Specific Area Message Encoding

== See also ==
- C2W
- CW2 (disambiguation)
- CW (disambiguation)
- CCW (disambiguation)
- C (disambiguation)
- W (disambiguation)
- WCW (disambiguation)
- WWC (disambiguation)
