= The Queen's Award for Enterprise: International Trade (Export) (2007) =

International trade award presented to businesses by Queen Elizabeth II

The Queen's Award for Enterprise: International Trade (Export) (2007) was awarded on 21 April 2007, by Queen Elizabeth II.

== Recipients ==
The following organisations were awarded this year.

- 4i2i Communications Ltd of Aberdeen, Scotland for software and semiconductor designs.
- The Aerogen Company Limited of Alton, Hampshire for industrial gas burner systems.
- Americhem Europe Limited of Manchester for colour additive concentrates for the thermoplastic industry.
- The Association of London WC2 for professional examinations and membership
- Avon Metals Limited of Gloucester for aluminium alloys.
- Beardow & Adams (Adhesives) Ltd of Milton Keynes for hot melt adhesives.
- Bridgehead International Limited of Melton Mowbray, for biopharmaceutical consultancy services.
- CWC Group Limited of London SW11 for international conferences, exhibitions and training.
- Cement Performance International Limited of Rochester, Kent for technical consultancy to the cement industry.
- Clyde & Co of London EC3 for legal services.
- Coaltrans Conferences Limited of London EC4 for international conferences, exhibitions, training, workshops and field trips.
- Cobham Defence Communications Ltd of Blackburn, Lancashire for intercom systems for high noise platforms.
- Coombe Castle International Ltd of Corsham, Wiltshire for cheese, butter and cream.
- Cummins Ltd, Daventry Plant of Daventry for high horsepower diesel and gas engines
- The Davy Roll Company Ltd of Gateshead, Tyne and Wear for cast rolls for the metal forming industries.
- Dunn Brothers (1995) Ltd of Smethwick, West Midlands for scrap metal recycling.
- EMB Consultancy LLP of Epsom, Surrey for actuarial advice to insurers, re-insurers and regulators, and actuarial software supply.
- ETL Systems Limited of Madley, Herefordshire for radio frequency equipment for satellite ground stations.
- ECOSYL Products Ltd of Stokesley, North Yorkshire for biological inoculants.
- Edinburgh Military Tattoo of Edinburgh, Scotland for a unique blend of music, ceremony and entertainment
- Extec Screens & Crushers Ltd of Swadlincote, Derbyshire for screening and crushing equipment.
- FT Technologies Ltd of Teddington, Middlesex for wind and airflow sensors, featuring patented acoustic resonance technology.
- FTC Kaplan Ltd of London SE1 for financial and business training services.
- Farécla Products Limited of Ware, Hertfordshire for specialist abrasive polishes for the vehicle repair industry.
- Fibercore Limited of Southampton, Hampshire for optical fibres.
- Giram UK Limited (trading as Q’Straint) Whitstable, Kent for wheelchair restraint systems.
- Grainger & Worrall Ltd of Bridgnorth, Shropshire for specialist castings for the automotive, motorsport, aerospace and defence industries.
- Helical Technology Limited of Lytham St. Annes, Lancashire for actuators for automotive turbochargers and valve rotators for large industrial engines.
- Horizon Global Electronics Ltd of Enfield, Middlesex for hand held test equipment for the digital/satellite sector.
- Hyperion Insurance Group Limited of London EC3 for insurance services.
- Imaginatik PLC of Winchester, Hampshire for software development.
- Inspecs Limited of Bath, Somerset for spectacle and sunglass frames.
- International Transmissions Ltd of Wrexham, Wales for integrated drivelines, powertrains, transmission and axle assemblies for on/off highway vehicles.
- JCB Compact Products Ltd of Cheadle, Staffordshire for small construction, industrial and agricultural equipment.
- JCB Materials Handling Ltd of Uttoxeter, Staffordshire for telescopic materials handlers.
- Joy Mining Machinery Limited of Worcester for underground mining machinery.
- Kronsten & Co of Twyford, Berkshire for aircraft spare parts and de/anti-icing fluid.
- L.E.K. Consulting of London SW1 for management consulting.
- Lavenham Leisure Ltd of Sudbury, Suffolk for horse rugs and quilted jackets.
- Leeson Polyurethanes Ltd of Warwick for polyurethane formulated chemicals.
- Link Project Services Ltd of Newton-le-Willows, Merseyside for project and operations management, engineers and support personnel for the oil and gas industry.
- Link Research Ltd of Watford, Hertfordshire for television encoders and modulators and digital wireless camera systems.
- Metal Interests Ltd of Chichester, West Sussex for non-ferrous metal recycling.
- Metryx Ltd of Nailsea, Bristol for metrology tools to the semiconductor industry.
- Herman Miller Limited of Chippenham, Wiltshire for office furniture.
- Mondrian Investment Partners Limited of London EC2 for investment management.
- Monsoon PLC of London W2 for fashion garments and accessories.
- NES Group Ltd of Altrincham, Cheshire for specialist technical and engineering recruitment company.
- Neogen Europe Ltd of Auchincruive, Ayr, for diagnostic kits for food safety testing.
- Networkers International (UK) plc of Beckenham, Kent Recruitment of technical personnel to the international for iCT marketplace.
- Next Generation Security Software Ltd of Sutton, Surrey for internet security software and consultancy services.
- Omega Foundry Machinery Limited of Orton Southgate, for foundry machinery and recycling systems.
- Optos Plc of Dunfermline, Scotland for scanning laser ophthalmoscopes capturing over 80% of the retina.
- Peak Scientific Instruments Ltd of Inchinnan, Renfrew, for gas generators.
- Portpack UK Limited of Hucknall, Nottingham for containerised mobile weighing and bagging plants and fixed plants for internal bagging applications.
- Precision Polymer Engineering Limited of Blackburn, Lancashire High performance sealing solutions.
- QRG Limited (trading as Quantum Research Group) of Southampton, Hampshire for electronic touch sensor chips and technology licensing for control surfaces of consumer electronic products.
- Racelogic Ltd of Buckingham for high accuracy GPS systems for automotive testing.
- Randox Laboratories Ltd of Crumlin, County Antrim, Northern Ireland for diagnostic kits for medical, veterinary and environmental monitoring
- Felix Rosenstiel’s Widow & Son Ltd of London SW3 for unframed reproduction art prints and posters.
- Routes Limited of Manchester for airline and airport air service development forums.
- SPI (Materials) Limited of Tamworth, Staffordshire for stainless steel tubing.
- Stephenson Group Limited of Bradford, West Yorkshire for speciality chemicals.
- Sunseeker International Limited of Poole, Dorset for luxury motor yachts.
- Titan Steel Wheels Limited of Kidderminster, Worcestershire for wheels for earthmoving machines, mobile cranes and dockside vehicles.
- United Corporation Ltd of Wallington, Surrey for spare parts and equipment to the oil and gas industries.
- Witherbys Publishing Ltd of London EC1 for shipping and insurance manuals and textbooks.
- John Wood Group PLC of Aberdeen, Scotland for international energy services to the oil and gas, and power generation industries.
- Wood Mackenzie Limited of Edinburgh, Scotland for energy and metals research and consultancy.
- Yamazaki Mazak U.K. Limited of Worcester for computer controlled machine tools.
