= CW2 =

CW2 may refer to any of the following:

== U.S. television stations affiliated with The CW ==
=== Current ===
==== Owned-and-operated ====
- KHON-TV-DT2 in Honolulu, Hawaii
- KWGN-TV in Denver, Colorado
- KXMA-TV in Dickinson, North Dakota
- WCBD-TV-DT2 in Charleston, South Carolina
- WTWO-DT2 in Terre Haute, Indiana

==== Affiliates ====
- KATN-DT3 in Fairbanks, Alaska
- KBOI-TV-DT2 in Boise, Idaho
  - Simulcast of local sister station KYUU-LD

=== Former ===
- KCWX in Fredericksburg–San Antonio, Texas (2006–2010)
- KTVQ-DT2 in Billings, Montana (2006–2023)
- WKTV-DT3 in Utica, New York (2006–2024)

== Other uses ==
- CW2, a postcode district in the CW postcode area
- Chief Warrant Officer 2, a rank of Warrant Officer (United States) in the United States military
- Creative Writer 2 software by Microsoft Kids
- Cw2 (cee double-u two) is a common misinterpretation of Cvv2 (cee vee vee two, for card verification value 2), a type of Card Security Code of credit and debit cards
- Cold War II

== See also ==
- Cwcw (film), a 2008 Welsh film, see List of Welsh films
- List of The CW affiliates (by U.S. state)
- C2W
- CW (disambiguation)
- CWW (disambiguation)
- C (disambiguation)
- W (disambiguation)
