= The Queen's Award for Enterprise: International Trade (Export) (2011) =

The Queen's Award for Enterprise: Sustainable Development (International Trade Export) (2011) was awarded on 21 April 2011, by Queen Elizabeth II.

The following organisations were awarded this year.

== Recipients ==
- Active Operations Management International LLP of Reading, Berkshire for their standards and best practice processes for delivering operational excellence in service operations.
- Addmaster (UK) Limited of Stafford for performance enhancing additives to improve product properties such as antimicrobial efficacy.
- Advanced Electronics Limited of Cramlington, Northumberland for electronic fire detection and life safety equipment.
- Aerotron Limited of Crawley, West Sussex for aircraft component product support.
- AES Engineering Ltd t/a Aesseal of Rotherham, South Yorkshire for mechanical seals and sealing systems.
- Allmakes Limited of Abingdon, Oxfordshire for Land Rover parts and accessories.
- Altek Europe Limited of Castle Donington, Derbyshire for aluminium processing products and services.
- AXA PPP International of Tunbridge Wells, Kent for private medical insurance.
- Barrett Dixon Bell Limited of Altrincham, Cheshire as a full service trade, technical & scientific marketing communications agency.
- Blackstar Amplification Limited of Northampton for guitar amplifiers and pedals.
- Bonds Limited of Castle Eden, County Durham for steel castings.
- Bridgehead International Limited of Melton Mowbray, Leicestershire as a strategic healthcare consultancy to the pharmaceutical, biotechnology and healthcare sectors.
- Buhler Sortex Limited of London for high speed optical sorters for cleaning post-harvest crops.
- CARES Limited of Ashford, Kent as consulting civil engineers.
- Centre for Advanced Studies Ltd t/a City of London College of London for international education.
- Chain Reaction Cycles Limited of Doagh, Ballyclare for bicycles and specialist cycle components.
- Chameleon Communications International Limited of London for medical education and marketing communications services to the pharmaceutical industry.
- RS Clare and Co. Limited of Liverpool, Merseyside for grease lubricants, road marking and anti-skid surface products.
- ClinTec International Limited of Glasgow for the provision of expert clinical research services.
- CobraUK Automotive Products Division Limited of Welshpool, Powys for automotive interiors products.
- Colorite Europe Limited of Belfast for PVC compounds.
- Craneware plc of Edinburgh for revenue integrity software.
- Crystalox Limited of Abingdon, Oxfordshire for multicrystalline silicon for the solar cell industry.
- CWC Group Limited of London for the organisation of conferences, exhibitions and training.
- Deep Sea Electronics Plc of Filey, North Yorkshire for electronic control solutions for standby power generators and engines.
- Delcam Plc of Birmingham for CADCAM software.
- DiGiCo UK Limited of Chessington, Surrey for digital audio mixing consoles.
- Dunlop Aircraft Tyres Limited of Erdington, Birmingham for aircraft tyres.
- EDS Group Holdings Limited of Sheffield, South Yorkshire as a decommissioning services contractor (demolition, asbestos removal & land remediation).
- ENTEK International Limited of Heswall, Wirral for battery separators for lead acid car and truck starter batteries.
- Fine and Rare Wines Limited of London for fine and rare wines.
- FlavorActiV Limited of Chinnor, Oxfordshire for taster training and management for the beverage industry.
- J W Galloway Limited of Bridge of Allan, Stirlingshire for beef and lamb products.
- GE Aircraft Engine Services Limited of Nantgarw, Cardiff for the overhaul, repair & maintenance of aircraft engines and components.
- Genesys International Limited of Middlewich, Cheshire for speciality antiscalant and cleaning chemicals for the desalination industry.
- Genuine Solutions Limited of Chessington, Surrey for mobile phone accessories.
- Global Digital Systems Limited of Hook, Hampshire for hardware and software used in geotechnical engineering for testing mechanical properties of soils and rocks.
- Haskoning UK Limited of Peterborough for engineering and environmental consultancy.
- HiBreeds International Limited of Old Catton, Norwich for fertile chicken hatching eggs.
- High-Point Rendel Limited of London for engineering, procurement & construction project consultants.
- Hilditch Group Limited of Malmesbury, Wiltshire for surplus medical and other equipment.
- Hyder Consulting Plc of London as an engineering consultancy.
- I D Business Solutions Limited of Guildford, Surrey for data management and analytics software for R&D and healthcare.
- ICAP plc of London as an interdealer broker and provider of post trade risk and information services.
- Igloo Books Limited of Sywell, Northamptonshire for children's and adults books.
- Inertial Systems Limited of Plymouth, Devon for inertial measurement products for precision control and ground proximity warnings software for military pilots.
- Infrared Integrated Systems Limited of Swan Valley, Northamptonshire for thermal detectors and systems for thermal imaging, people counting, queue management and security applications.
- International Export Supplies Limited of Needham Market, Suffolk for automotive and motorsport components.
- James Halstead plc of Radcliffe, Greater Manchester for commercial floor coverings.
- Korala Associates Limited of Sunnyside, Edinburgh for multi-vendor ATM software.
- Lastolite Limited of Coalville, Leicestershire for photographic lighting and background accessories.
- Lo-Q plc of Twyford, Berkshire for queue management reservation systems for theme parks and leisure venues.
- Lund Halsey Console Systems Limited of Aylesbury, Buckinghamshire for specialist control room technical furniture.
- LycoRed Limited of Aylesford, Kent for nutritional blends for use in the fortification of foods.
- Macuk Neuroscience Limited of Blackpool, Lancashire for clinical research services.
- Magstim Company Limited of Whitland, Carmarthenshire for neural stimulators and intraoperative nerve monitors.
- Malvern Instruments Limited of Malvern, Worcestershire for scientific instrumentation for the measurement of physical and chemical properties of materials.
- Mangajo UK Limited of Hayes, Middlesex for green tea and redbush tea based soft drinks.
- Martin-Baker Aircraft Co. Limited of Uxbridge, Middlesex for military aircrew survival systems.
- Media Analytics Limited of Oxford as a publisher of reports, newsletters and conference organisers.
- Metal Interests Limited of Chichester, West Sussex for metal recycling.
- Microgard Limited of Hull, East Yorkshire for limited life industrial clothing.
- Middlesex University Higher Education Corporation of London for English language training, higher education & accommodation.
- Miller and Miller (Chemicals) Limited of Hainault, Essex for pharmaceuticals and equipment use in hospitals.
- Morgan Innovation & Technology Limited of Petersfield, Hampshire for medical and other electronic devices.
- Norbrook Laboratories Limited of Newry, County Down for veterinary and human pharmaceuticals.
- OpTek Ltd of Abingdon, Oxfordshire for laser systems.
- Optimal Performance Limited of Clifton, Bristol for research and consultancy to improve health & performance in physically demanding occupations.
- Oxford Instruments Plasma Technology of Yatton, Bristol for high performance capital equipment for the semi-conductor industry.
- Pandrol UK Limited of Worksop, Nottinghamshire for railway fastenings and track support systems.
- Peak Scientific Instruments Limited of Inchinnan, Renfrewshire for gas generators.
- Plant Parts Limited of Hadleigh, Suffolk for spare parts and final drives for construction machinery.
- Portmeirion Group PLC of Stoke-on-Trent, Staffordshire for homewares and accessories.
- Prism Media Products Limited of Stretham, Cambridgeshire for equipment & software for music, broadcast & film sound production and audio testing in manufacturing.
- Probiotics International Limited of South Petherton, Somerset for probiotic based products for animals and humans.
- Rayburn Trading Company of Manchester for own-brand health and beauty & household products.
- RealVNC Limited of Cambridge for remote access software for computers and mobile devices.
- Rofin-Sinar UK Limited of Willerby, East Riding of Yorkshire for lasers and laser systems.
- Russell IPM Limited of Deeside, Flintshire for insect pheromones based products.
- Sciencesoft Limited of Glasgow for reservoir engineering visualisation and data analysis software for the oil and gas industry.
- Severn Glocon of Quedgeley, Gloucestershire for bespoke severe service control and choke valves.
- Sleev-it Fire Systems Limited of Rainham, Kent for penetration pipe seals.
- Smart Voucher Ltd t/a Ukash of London for a financial service for cash-based consumers which enables online payments and remittance.
- Softbox Systems Limited of Long Crendon, Buckinghamshire for temperature controlled packaging solutions.
- Solufeed Limited of Barnham, Bognor Regis for speciality fertilisers.
- Speciality Paperboard Containers Limited of Rotherham, South Yorkshire for speciality paperboard packaging.
- Sun Mark Limited of Greenford, Middlesex for groceries, soft drinks & household toiletries.
- Thales Missile Electronics Limited of Basingstoke, Hampshire for safety and arming units and defence electronics.
- Thales Optronics Limited of Glasgow for optronic day and night-vision equipment and systems.
- Thermserve Limited of Telford, Shropshire for equipment for processing primary and secondary aluminium.
- Tiger Filtration Limited of Pallion, Sunderland for compressed air & gas filtration products.
- Toby Churchill Limited of Over, Cambridgeshire for speech communication aids.
- Trio Healthcare Limited of Skipton, North Yorkshire for skin care products for the ostomy, incontinence and wound care sectors of the healthcare industry.
- Trustees of the London Clinic Limited of London for medical and surgical diagnosis and treatment.
- UHV Design Limited of Lewes, East Sussex for high specification manipulation for use at ultra high vacuum for both pioneering research & production.
- UK Carbon & Graphite Co. Ltd of Belper, Derbyshire for carbon and graphite components.
- Ukash of London, for its geographical and financial growth
- Uniline Safety Systems Limited of Redditch, Worcestershire for engineered fall protection, access and rescue solutions.
- United Corporation Limited of Wallington, Surrey for procurement and supply of various spares to the oil and gas industries.
- University of Bedfordshire of Luton, Bedfordshire for higher education.
- University of Manchester of Oxford Road, Manchester for degrees in higher education.
- ZED Tunnel Guidance Limited of Walton on Thames, Surrey for guidance systems for tunnelling machines.
- Zenith Oilfield Technology Limited of Inverurie, Aberdeenshire for technology equipment and services to the oil industry.
