= WCCS (disambiguation) =

WCCS may refer to:

== Groups, organizations ==
- Wallace Community College Selma, in Selma, Alabama, USA
- War Camp Community Services (WCCS), former name of The National Recreation Foundation
- Watford Christian Counselling Service, in Watford, UK
- Westminster Cathedral Choir School, in London, UK
- Westminster Catawba Christian School, in Rock Hill, South Carolina, USA
- West Country Chest Society, a professional society for respiratory physicians in South West England, UK

== Callsigns ==
- WCCS, a radio station in Homer City, Pennsylvania, USA
- a defunct carrier-current radio station, predecessor to WFCS

== Other uses ==
- Windows Compute Cluster Server - Microsoft high-performance computing (HPC) cluster technology offering, released at June 2006.

== See also ==
- WCS (disambiguation)
- WCC (disambiguation)
