= Peak Scientific =

Scottish manufacturer of gas generators

Peak Scientific is a Scottish manufacturer of gas generators for analytical laboratories. Headquartered in Glasgow, United Kingdom, it specialises in the production of nitrogen, hydrogen, and gas generators, mainly for the fields of liquid chromatography–mass spectrometry and gas chromatography.

== History ==
Peak Scientific was established by its founder and current chairman Robin MacGeachy in 1992 originally operating as an air compressor distributor until 1997 when the company was registered to manufacture gas generators on a 10,000 square foot facility at Inchinnan. It was not until 2004 when Robin MacGeachy fully acquired the business.

Timeline

1992 – Business initially established as a distributor of air compressors

1997 – Peak Scientific established to manufacture gas generators

2005 – First international office opens in North America

2007 – India office opens

2008 – Africa office opens

2010 – Mexico, China and Hong Kong offices open

2011 – Australia office opens

2012 – Offices in Germany, Brazil, Japan and Singapore open

2013 – Offices in Canada, France and Spain open

2015 – New offices open in India and Abu Dhabi

2016 – Third office in India opens

2017 – Business is registered in Ireland and Vietnam

2018 – Office in Korea opens

== Operations ==
Peak Scientific manufactures all of its generators at its headquarters in Inchinnan, Scotland but also has offices in Europe, North America, South America, Africa, Australia, China, India and Southeast Asia.

== Products and services ==
Peak Scientific supplies small to large scale nitrogen, hydrogen, and zero air gas systems mainly for the laboratory and scientific markets and more specifically for Gas Chromatography (GC) and Liquid Chromatography Mass Spectrometry (LC/MS) markets.

== Awards ==
Peak Scientific has received The Queen's Award for Enterprise: International Trade in 2004, 2007, 2011, 2014 and in 2016. In 2016 Peak Scientific Instruments Ltd also received the Queen's Award for Enterprise: Innovation.

== See also ==
- Gas generator
- Nitrogen generator
- Hydrogen production
- The Queen's Award for Enterprise: International Trade (Export) (2007)
- The Queen's Award for Enterprise: International Trade (Export) (2011)
