= Jocelyne Machevo =

Mozambican energy executive

Jocelyne Machevo is a Mozambican energy executive who became most known for her work in the first ever liquefied natural gas project for the country of Mozambique, the Coral South FLNG Project. She is the first female Mozambican to hold an executive position at Eni Ronuma Basin. She has a degree in civil engineering from the Higher Institute of Transport and Communications in Mozambique and a Master ́s degree in Economy and Management of Energy and Environment from Eni Corporate University in Milan, Italy. She is also a Young African Leader Initiative (YALI) fellow, she attended the first cohort of Power Africa - Young Women in African Power Leadership Training in 2018.

== Background ==
She started her career in 2013 as a civil engineer at Eni, an international energy company, where she held several roles in the Projects department and acquired skills in project management, business development, Gas and LNG supply contracts, stakeholder’s management, local content development and community development initiatives. She is the first woman and the first Mozambican to hold an executive position at Eni Rovuma Basin, Eni subsidiary in Mozambique. At the end of 2020, she joined Total Exploration & Production Mozambique, as Interface Lead in the biggest LNG project in Mozambique at the time, the Mozambique LNG. She is currently working as an O&G and Energy consultant in the areas of business development, investment strategy, stakeholders’ engagement, local content development, energy transition and diversity, equity and inclusion.

== Awards ==
In 2017, she won the “Outstanding Mozambican Woman of the Year” award at the CWC Mozambique Gas Summit.

In 2019, she won the Power Play Rising Star Award, given to a young female under 35 who made a significant impact on the LNG industry.

In 2021, she received an Excellence Award at the Second Edition of the Angola Oil & Gas Technology Conference (AOTC) in Luanda, Angola. The award is presented to a woman who always go above and beyond to make a positive impact in the industry and serving as an inspiration and role model to both men and women. The award recognizes the work Jocelyne has been doing in the Oil & Gas Industry.
