= Joe Dickinson =

American football player and coach (born 1956)

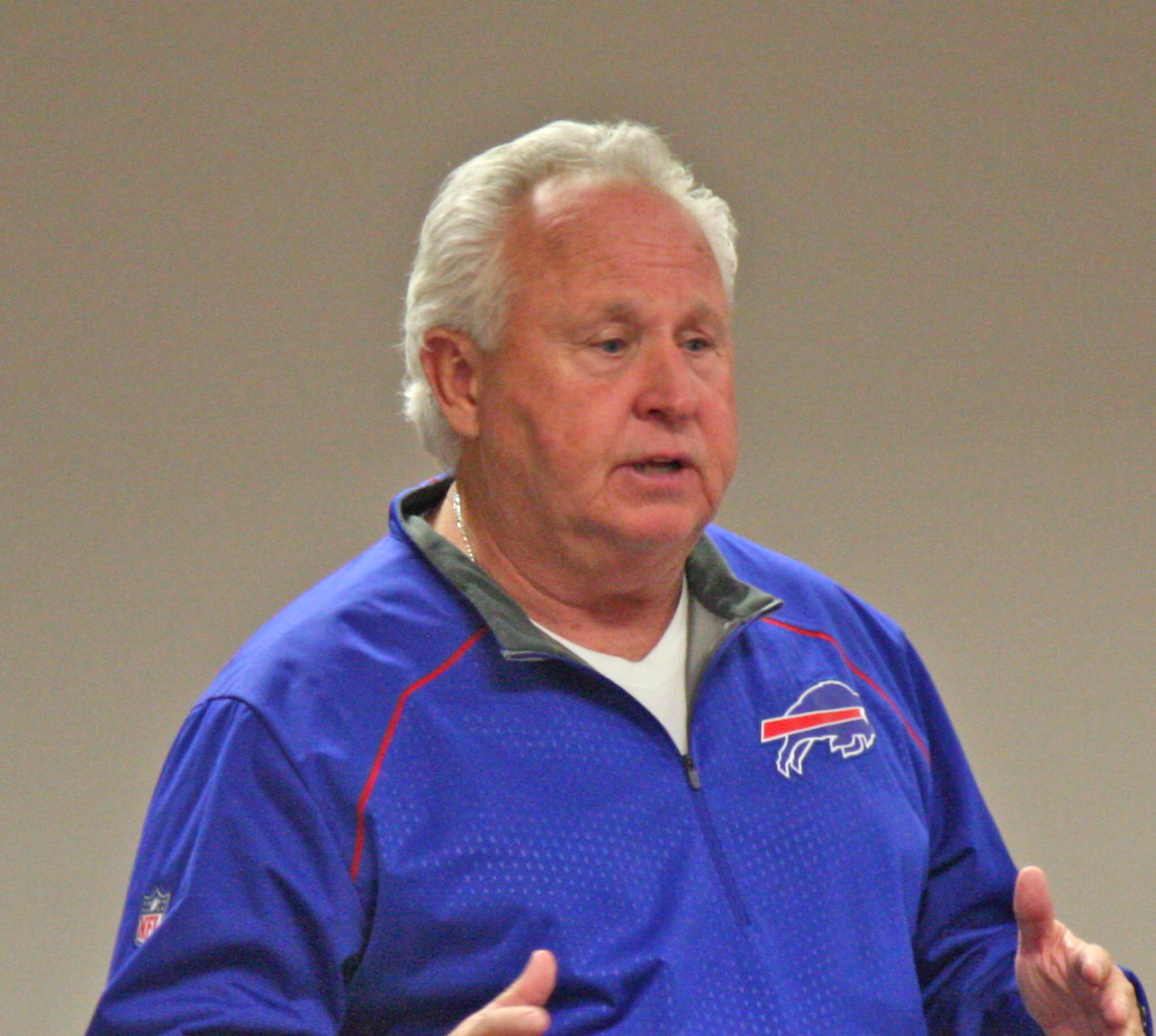
- Dickinson speaking at a camp in 2015

Playing career
- East Central
- Position: Quarterback

Coaching career (HC unless noted)
- 1978–1980: Tecumseh HS (OK)
- 1981–1982: Edmond HS (OK)
- 1983: Davis HS (OK)
- 1983–1985: Oklahoma (GA)
- 1986–1989: Tulsa (RB)
- 1990: Marshall (OC)
- 1991–1995: Northern Illinois (OC/QB)
- 1996–1997: Oklahoma (RB)
- 1998: Oklahoma (OC)
- 1999–2000: Tulane (RB)
- 2003–2006: Central Oklahoma (QB/WR)

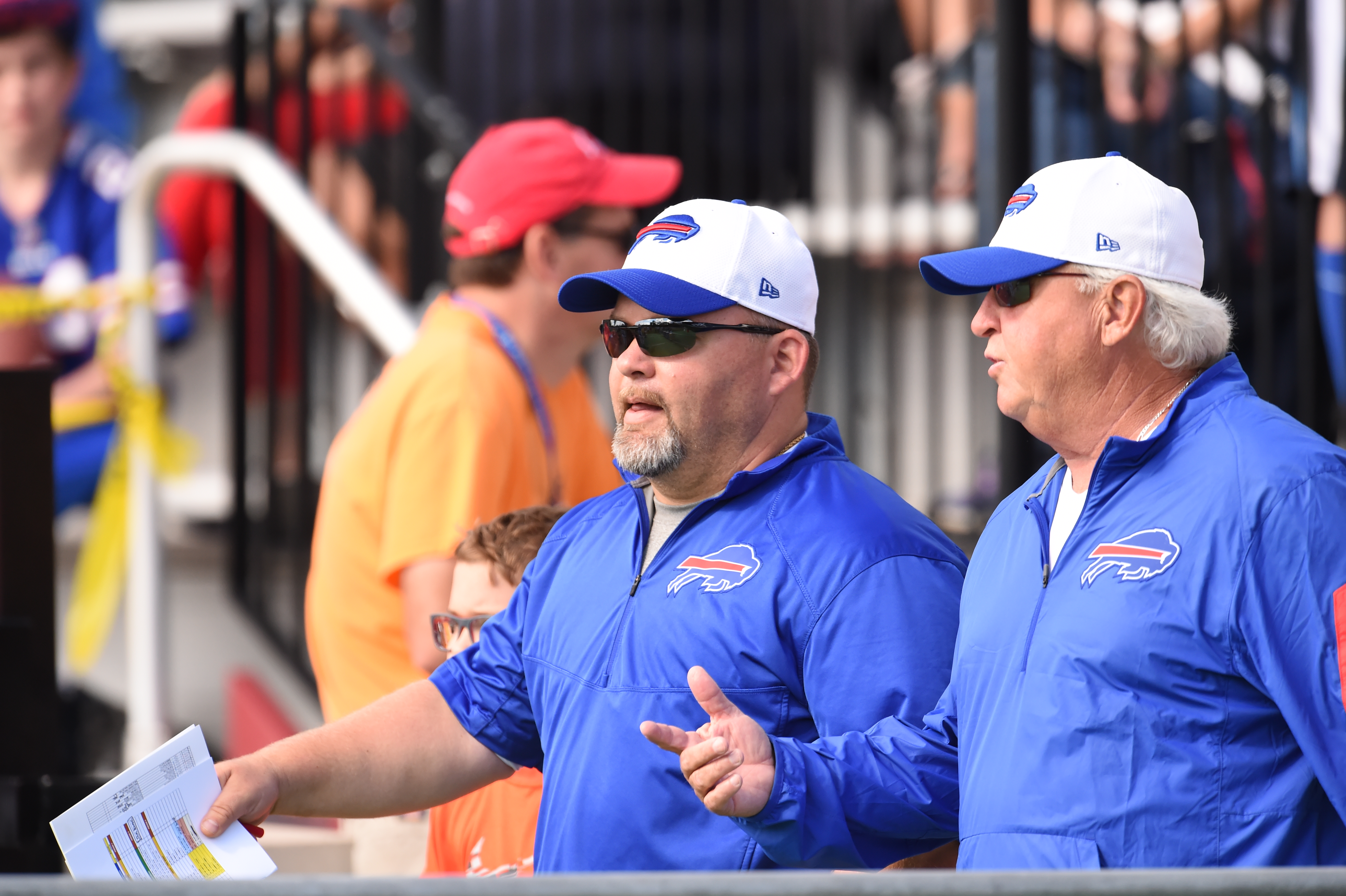
Quarterback Consultant Joe Dickinson (Right) with Buffalo Bills Offensive Coordinator Greg Roman (Left)

Joe Dickinson (born July 17, 1956) is an American football coach and former player. Most notably, he served as the offensive coordinator at the University of Northern Illinois from 1991 to 1995, and the University of Oklahoma in 1998. Dickinson also was an assistant coach at the University of Tulsa, Marshall University, Tulane University and the University of Central Oklahoma. Dickinson was previously an NFL quarterback consultant for the Buffalo Bills and served as the director of coaching and lead quarterback instructor for DeBartolo Sports University for fourteen years, conducting both private and group training events across the United States. DeBartolo Sports University was owned by former San Francisco 49ers owner, Edward J. DeBartolo Jr. Dickinson is currently coaching private sessions for his Elite QBClub.

== High school and college ==
Dickinson attended Wayne High School in Wayne, Oklahoma, and was a four-sport standout. Upon graduation he attended East Central University in Ada, Oklahoma, and was a three-year letter winner as quarterback of their football team.

== Coaching career ==
Dickinson began his coaching career as an assistant for Tecumseh High School (1978–80), as well as Edmond High School (1981–82). He used that experience to gain a head coaching position in 1983, at one of the premier football programs in Oklahoma, Davis High School.

After concluding one full season, Dickinson became a graduate assistant for the University of Oklahoma (1983–85), where he was part of the 1985 Sooner National Championship team coached by Barry Switzer. During these years at Oklahoma, Dickinson was able to coach and work with Pro Football Hall of Fame quarterback Troy Aikman.

From 1986 to 1989, Dickinson would hold the position of running backs coach for the University of Tulsa before leaving to become the offensive coordinator for Marshall University in 1990. Under his direction, Marshall scored 42 or more points in four of their contests.

At the conclusion of the season, Dickinson took his play-calling skills to Northern Illinois University where he served as offensive coordinator and quarterbacks coach from 1991 to 1995. In 1993, he helped oversee the nation's leading rusher, LeShon Johnson, who carried for 1,976 yards on 327 carries while finishing 6th in the Heisman voting.

In 1996, Dickinson moved back to his native Oklahoma for a second stint with the Sooners coaching staff. He started as the running backs coach from 1996 to 1997, where he coached RB De'mond Parker who finished with 2,327 rushing yards and 16 touchdowns in two seasons. Dickinson would be promoted to offensive coordinator for the 1998 season. That year, he helped the Sooners to their best finish since 1995, but would leave the program with the arrival of Bob Stoops in 1999.

Dickinson accepted a position with Tulane University to be their running backs coach. In the 1999 season, he guided five Green Wave players to carry the ball at least 38 times and help four of the five backs to achieve an average yard per carry of over 4 yards.

Wanting to be close to his home, Dickinson moved back to Oklahoma where he would become the Recruiting Coordinator and Quarterback and Wide Receiver Coach for the University of Central Oklahoma (2003–06). Here, he was attributed with bringing in highly touted recruiting classes and helped the Central Oklahoma Bronco quarterbacks pass for 8,944 yards and over 40 touchdowns in his four seasons with the team.

After concluding his twenty five years in the college coaching ranks, Dickinson helped tutor young quarterbacks through the Air 7 Quarterback University that traveled throughout the United States. The highlight of the Air 7 Quarterback University (known today as Football University) was the strong relationship with the United States Army All-American Bowl which highlights the top high school athletes around the country.

In 2007, Dickinson was hired to be the Lead Quarterback Instructor at DeBartolo Sports University which conducts quarterback camps and private training all over the country. Since 2007, over 1100 Quarterbacks have been trained by Dickinson, ranging from amateur to professional levels.

Throughout his coaching career, he has been credited to work with NFL quarterbacks Bubby Brister, Troy Aikman, J. P. Losman, Patrick Ramsey, Gus Frerotte, Rudy Carpenter, Josh Freeman, Rhett Bomar, Matt Barkley, Chase Daniel, Tyrod Taylor, Josh Johnson, and Mac Jones. He is also credited with the development of college quarterbacks Austin Brown, Conner Preston (Southern Methodist University), Dayne Crist (University of Notre Dame), Cody Keith (East Carolina University), Daxx Garman (Oklahoma State University), David Cornwell (University of Alabama), Alexander Diamont (Indiana University), Colin Feller (University of Miami), Graham Wilbert (Florida Atlantic University), Quinn Shanbour (Oklahoma State University) Mac Jones (University of Alabama), Myles Crawley (Grambling State University), Hauss Hejny (Texas Christian University), Major Cantrell (Iowa State University), and Brody Johnson (Northwestern Oklahoma). Dickinson is also responsible for assisting in the development of the following 2014 and 2015 Division One quarterback commitments: Travis Smith (University of Toledo), Landon Root (Northern Illinois University), Colin Feller (University of Miami), Rafe Peavey (University of Arkansas), and John Jacobs (East Carolina University).

== Personal life ==
He has also appeared in the Snoop Dogg television series Fatherhood, where he is shown tutoring Snoop Dogg's son who is focused on developing his quarterback skills. He is also part of the documentary, "The Hopeful," starring East Carolina University quarterback Cody Keith.

Dickinson resides in Rosedale, Oklahoma.
