= CWC =

CWC may refer to:

== Legal ==
- Chemical Weapons Convention, a 1997 international treaty prohibiting chemical weapons

== Media ==
- California Writers Club
- Crime Writers of Canada

== Organizations ==
=== Businesses ===
- Cabot Watch Company, a British military supplier
- Central Warehousing Corporation, an Indian government-owned corporation
- Cable & Wireless Communications, a British telecommunications company
- Cuyamaca Water Company, a former water company in California, U.S.

=== Colleges and universities ===
- Central Wyoming College, Riverton, Wyoming, U.S.
- City of Westminster College, London, UK
- Colorado Women's College, Colorado, U.S.
- Columbia Water Center, a research institute in New York, U.S.
- Clongowes Wood College, Kildare, Ireland

=== Political organizations ===
- Ceylon Workers' Congress, a Sri Lankan political party
- Clyde Workers' Committee, a Scottish workers' organisation during World War I
- Congress Working Committee, the central decision-making body of the Indian National Congress
- CrimethInc., an anarchist group

=== Other organizations ===
- Chernivtsi International Airport, Ukraine, IATA code CWC
- Kickapoo Downtown Airport, Wichita Falls, Texas, U.S., FAA LID: CWC
- Concerned for Working Children, an India-based non-profit organization
- CWC Group, energy trading company
- Co-existing with Coyotes, a Stanley Park Ecology Society public education program

== Science, technology and mathematics ==
- CWC mode, a type of encryption
- Cwc, cold subtropical highland climate in the Köppen climate classification

== Sport ==
- Camsur Watersports Complex, Camarines Sur, Philippines
- Capitol Wrestling Corporation, a former American professional wrestling body, now known as WWE
- Chess World Cup, a number of different chess tournaments
- Collegiate World Championship, a pickleball competition held in the United States
- Cricket World Cup, an international cricket championship
- Cruiserweight Classic, a professional wrestling tournament
- FIFA Club World Cup, an intercontinental club football competition
- UEFA Cup Winners' Cup, a defunct UEFA football tournament

== Other uses ==
- Cardigan Welsh Corgi, a dog breed
- Corded Ware culture, a broad archaeological horizon of Europe between c. 2900 BCE – circa 2350 BCE
