= Nicky Ladanowski =

British actress

- Born: 1987 (age 38–39); London, England
- Website: nickyladanowski.com

Nicky Ladanowski is a British actress and writer working in both the UK and USA in Television, Film, Theatre and Voiceovers. She is known for various roles in an extensive film and television career including Saskia Benson and then Merle Jackson in Coronation Street, Mandy Cutler in Paradise Heights and Mand in Grease Monkeys. She is often known for playing fun, glamorous characters such as Anne-Marie in Hollyoaks and loveable characters such as nurse Sarah in Death Becomes Him and Lisa Trotter in The Sarah Jane Adventures for the BBC. She is also famed for her many comedic roles in shows such as the BBC's My Family and with Ricky Gervais in Extras as Les Dennis's fiancé Simone Lewis. Having starred in all of the UK's medical drama's Holby City, Casualty and Doctors, she is also credited with roles in Law & Order: UK for ITV and Waterloo Road for the BBC. She has recently appeared in various comedic commercials in the USA including for the Women's World Cup for FOX Television and voiced many commercials and animations.

== Filmography ==
WISE Commercial USA (2025)	Elizabeth	National TV Campaign (Little Big Engine)
FIFA Women's World Cup 2023 Commercial	Ella London	FOX Television USA
Doctors	Tiffany Hargreave	BBC
Waterloo Road	Yvonne Tindall	BBC
Micah	Jenny	Channel4
Law & Order: UK	Diane Carver	ITV
My Family	Jade	BBC
Casualty	Ashleigh Wilton	BBC
Consuming Passion: 100 Years of Mills & Boon	Brenda	BBC
The Sarah Jane Adventures - "Secrets of the Stars"	Lisa Trotter	BBC
The Bill	Jenna Murray	ITV
Little Miss Jocelyn	Model & Assistant	BBC
Hollyoaks	Anne Marie	Channel4
The Afternoon Play - Death Becomes Him	Sarah	BBC
These Foolish Things	Sylvia	Feature Film
Doctors	Shani	BBC
Extras	Simone Lewis	BBC
According to Bex	Sarah	BBC
My Family	Anne	BBC
Dream Team	Jade	SKY ONE
The Soho Theatre - Cherished Disappointments	Metaphor Girl	Theatre
The Eustace Brothers	Mandy Cutler	BBC
Coronation Street	Merle Jackson	ITV
Grease Monkeys	Mand	BBC
Brookside	Candy	Channel 4
Paradise Heights	Mandy Cutler	BBC
Is Harry on the Boat?	Liz	SKY ONE
Holby City	Clare	BBC
Coronation Street	Saskia	ITV
The Bill	Lynette	ITV
Vanity Fair Chester Gateway Theatre	Amelia Sedley	Theatre
People Like Us	Waitress	BBC
Appetite	Bella	Feature Film
Johnathan Creek	Brenda	BBC
Royal National Theatre - Death of a Salesman	Letta	Theatre
Royal Shakespeare Company - Coriolanus	Citizen	Theatre
Bendicks Mingles Commercial	Chantelle	UK National Campaign
Bendicks Gorgeous Commercial	Chantelle	UK National Campaign
