= °W =

°W may refer to:

- °W (temperature) ("degree Wedgwood"), a temperature scale by Josiah Wedgwood in the 18th century
- °W (film speed) ("degree Warnerke"), a film speed by Leon Warnerke (Władysław Małachowski) in the late 19th century
- Voiceless labial–velar approximant, (actually ẘ) a letter used in the International Phonetic Alphabet

== See also ==
- W (disambiguation)
