= Upmanu Lall =

American Earth Scientist

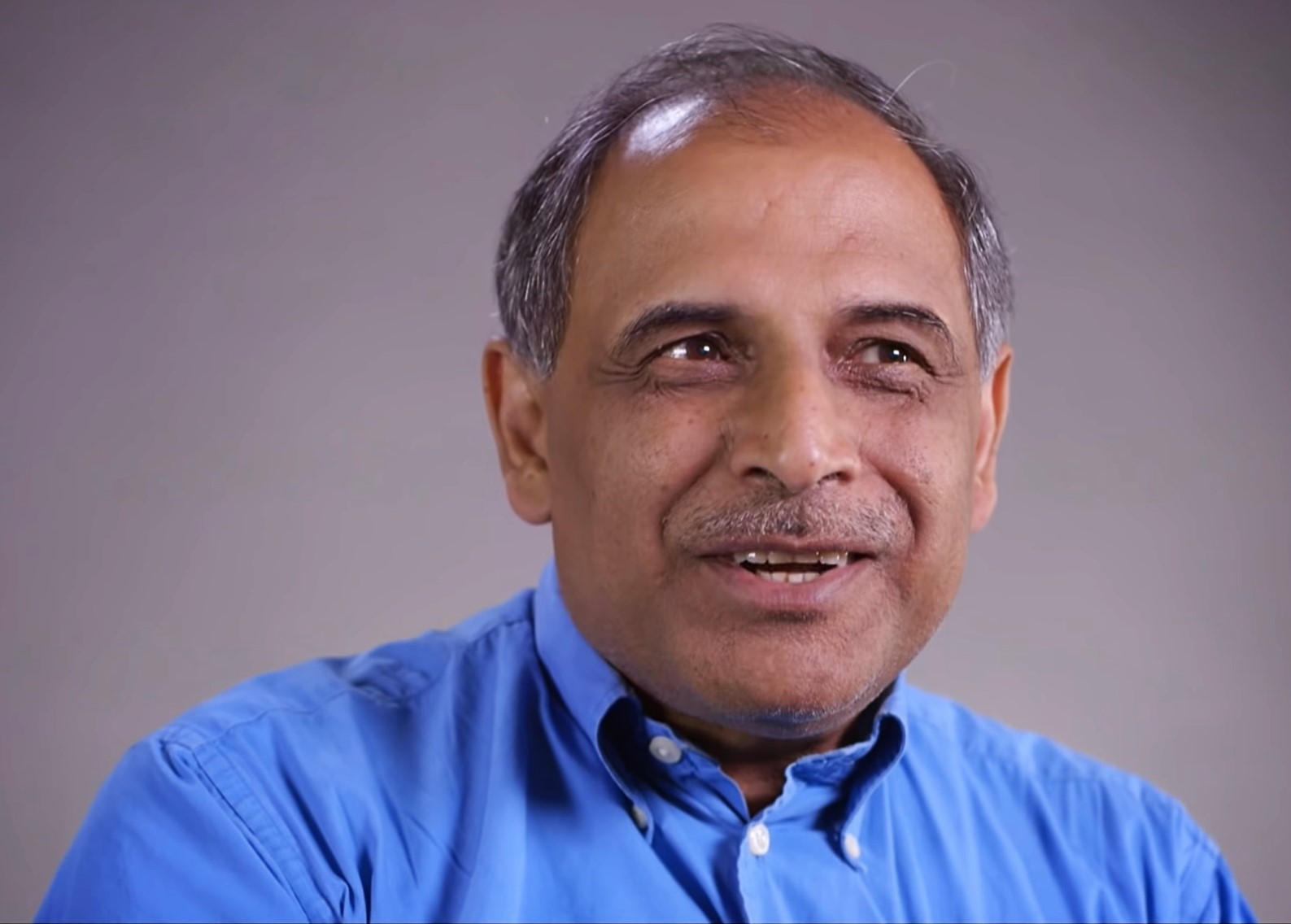
- Lall speaks at the 2013 World Economic Forum in Davos, Switzerland
- Education: University of Texas at Austin; IIT Kanpur
- Scientific career
- Workplaces: Arizona State University; Columbia University
- Thesis: Value of data in relation to uncertainty and risk (1981)

Upmanu Lall is an Indian American engineer and the founding director of the Water Institute at the Julie Ann Wrigley Global Futures Laboratory at Arizona State University in Tempe. He also has a faculty appointment as professor in the School of Complex Adaptive Systems within the College of Global Futures. Prior to joining ASU in January 2024, Lall was the Alan and Carol Silberstein Professor of Engineering at Columbia University in Manhattan, New York. He served as founding director of the Columbia Water Center. He studies how to solve water scarcity and how to predict and mitigate floods. In 2014, he was awarded the Henry Darcy Medal by the European Geosciences Union. He was named an American Geophysical Union Fellow in 2017 and their Walter Langbein Lecturer in 2022. He was elected a fellow of the American Association for the Advancement of Science in 2018, and has received the Arid Lands Hydrology and the Ven Te Chow Awards from the American Society of Civil Engineers. In April 2021 he was named to the “Hot List of the world’s 1,000 top climate scientists” by Reuters. In 2025, he received the Peter S. Eagleson Award from the American Geophysical Union . In 2026, he received the Distinguished Alumnus Award of IIT Kanpur.

== Early life and education ==
Lall was born in 1956 in Dharamsala in Himanchal Pradesh, India. He studied civil engineering at IIT Kanpur and graduated in 1976. He earned his master's degree and doctorate degree in civil and environmental engineering from the University of Texas at Austin, in 1981. His doctoral research considered the value of data in uncertainty and risk. Lall was trained in hydrology and water resources, but recognized the importance of hydrologic systems analysis, statistics and climate dynamics. In the 1990s he got interested in climate change, nonlinear dynamics, and applied functional analysis leading to significant contributions in nonparametric function estimation, applied statistics, and hydroclimatic predictability.

== Research and career ==
Lall works on hydrology, climate dynamics, and water systems. He is the director of the Water Institute at Arizona State University launched in 2024 designed to predict and address water challenges from community to national to global scales. He previously served as the director at the Columbia Water Center, where he looked at water scarcity, hydroclimatic extremes, infrastructure issues, and risk. He developed a Global Flood Initiative which predicts, manages and controls floods from a global climate dynamics perspective, and a Global Water Sustainability Initiative which concentrates on water scarcity and risks. He was one of the first scientists to identify the significance of climate teleconnections (climate anomalies that are related to one another over long distances) in terrestrial hydrology. His work focuses on a research program called America's Water initiative seeking to develop sustainable water management and infrastructure investment strategies, and to strengthen resilience to the changing climate.

Lall has been involved in policy making and science communication, including providing insight at the World Economic Forum. He initiated the establishment of the Consortium of Universities for the Advancement of Hydrologic Science, and is the editor-in-chief of the Elsevier journal Water Security.

== Awards and honors ==
- 2011 American Society of Civil Engineers Arid Lands Hydrology Award
- 2014 European Geosciences Union Henry Darcy Medal
- 2016 American Geophysical Union President of the Natural Hazards Focus Group
- 2017 American Geophysical Union Fellow
- 2018 American Association for the Advancement of Science Fellow
- 2021 Reuter's Hot List of the World's top 1000 climate scientists:
- 2022 American Geophysical Union Walter Langbein Lecture
- 2023 American Society of Civil Engineers Ven Te Chow Award
- 2025 American Geophysical Union Peter S. Eagleson Award
- 2026 Distinguished Alumnus Award of IIT Kanpur

== Selected publications ==
- Upmanu Lall; Ashish Sharma (1996). "A Nearest Neighbor Bootstrap For Resampling Hydrologic Time Series". Water Resources Research. 32 (3): 679–693. doi:10.1029/95wr02966. Wikidata Q58092067.
- Moon YI; Balaji Rajagopalan; Upmanu Lall (1995). "Estimation of mutual information using kernel density estimators". Physical Review E. 52 (3): 2318–2321. Bibcode:1995PhRvE..52.2318M. doi:10.1103/physreve.52.2318. PMID 9963673. Wikidata Q38531494.
- Masahiko Haraguchi; Upmanu Lall (2015). "Flood risks and impacts: A case study of Thailand's floods in 2011 and research questions for supply chain decision making". International Journal of Disaster Risk Reduction. 14: 256–272. doi:10.1016/j.ijdrr.2014.09.005. Wikidata Q58091539.

== See also ==
- Indians in the New York City metropolitan area
