= Mason Rudolph (American football) =

American football player (born 1995)

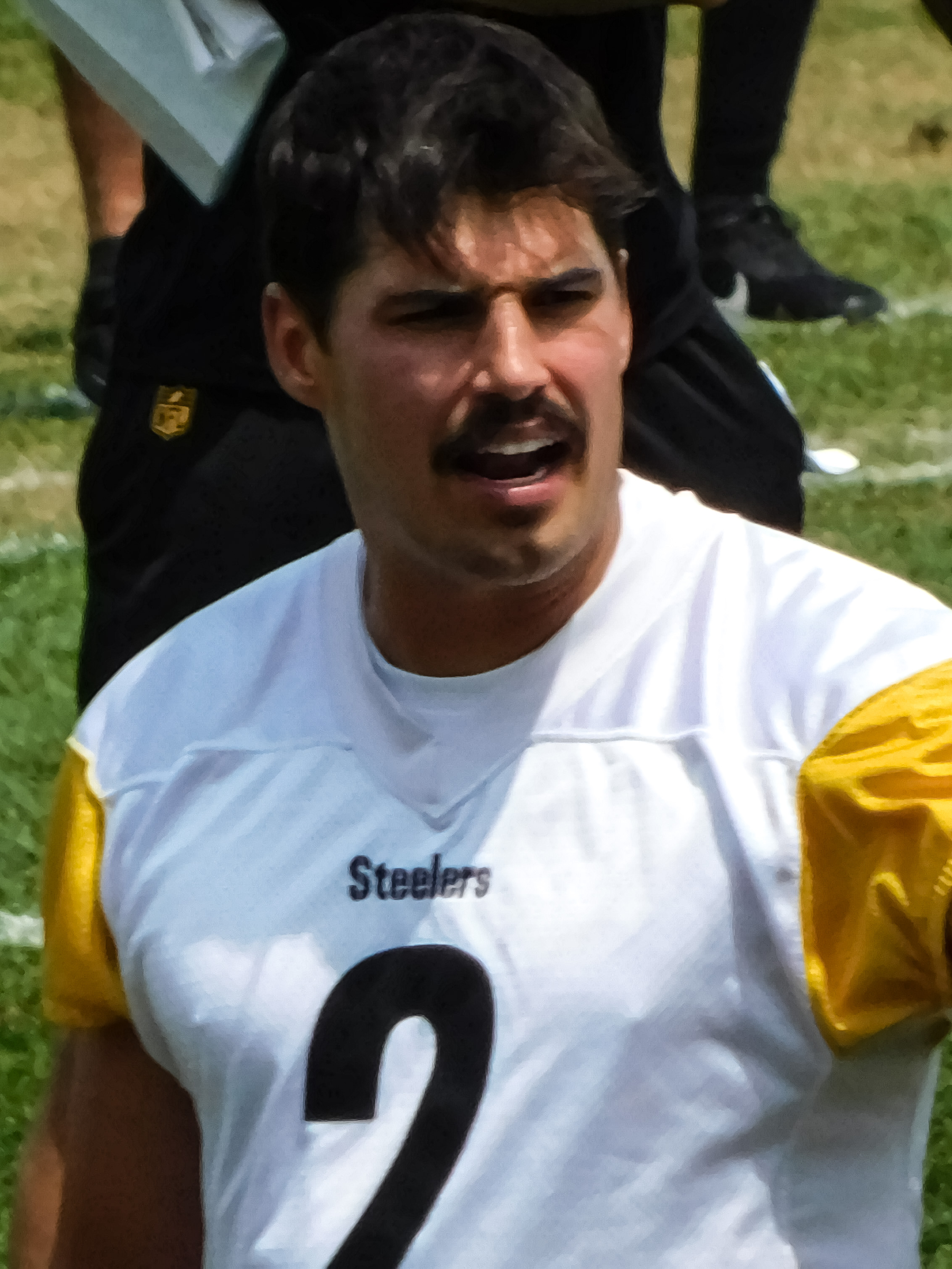
- Rudolph with the Pittsburgh Steelers in 2025

No. 2 – Pittsburgh Steelers
- Position: Quarterback
- Roster status: Active

Personal information
- Born: July 17, 1995 (age 31); Rock Hill, South Carolina, U.S.
- Listed height: 6 ft 5 in (1.96 m)
- Listed weight: 235 lb (107 kg)

Career information
- High school: Northwestern (Rock Hill)
- College: Oklahoma State (2014–2017)
- NFL draft: 2018: 3rd round, 76th overall pick

Career history
- Pittsburgh Steelers (2018–2023); Tennessee Titans (2024); Pittsburgh Steelers (2025–present)

Awards and highlights
- Johnny Unitas Golden Arm Award (2017); Sammy Baugh Trophy (2017); NCAA passing yards leader (2017); Second-team All-Big 12 (2017); Camping World Bowl MVP (2017)

Career NFL statistics as of Week 10, 2026
- Passing attempts: 742
- Passing completions: 476
- Completion percentage: 64.2%
- TD–INT: 30–22
- Passing yards: 4,927
- Passer rating: 84.3
- Stats at Pro Football Reference

Brett Mason Rudolph III (born July 17, 1995) is an American professional football quarterback for the Pittsburgh Steelers of the National Football League (NFL). He played college football for the Oklahoma State Cowboys, winning the Johnny Unitas Golden Arm Award during his last year before being drafted by the Steelers in the third round of the 2018 NFL draft. Rudolph has also played for the Tennessee Titans.

From 2018 to 2022, Rudolph primarily served as a backup, making occasional starts. He re-signed with the Steelers in 2023 and spent most of the season as the third-string quarterback before being named the starter late in the season. Rudolph led the Steelers to three consecutive wins, setting a franchise record for completion percentage in the final regular-season game and started in the Wild Card Round against the Buffalo Bills. After one season in Tennessee, Rudolph returned to Pittsburgh in 2025.

== Early life ==
Rudolph was named after his father and grandfather; he is not related to the former golfer Mason Rudolph. Rudolph attended Westminster Catawba Christian School before transferring to Northwestern High School in Rock Hill, South Carolina. During his career, Rudolph passed for 10,986 yards and 132 passing touchdowns. As a senior, he accounted for 80 total touchdowns and threw for 4,400 yards as he led the Trojans to a 15–0 record, 4A State Championship and #7 national ranking. Rudolph played in the Annual Shrine Bowl All-Star game and was named the offensive MVP as he led South Carolina on a game-winning drive in the final 20 seconds. Rudolph was a finalist for South Carolina's "Mr. Football" award. He was rated by Rivals.com as a four-star recruit and was ranked as the ninth-best pro-style quarterback in his class. Rudolph committed to Oklahoma State University to play college football.

== College career ==
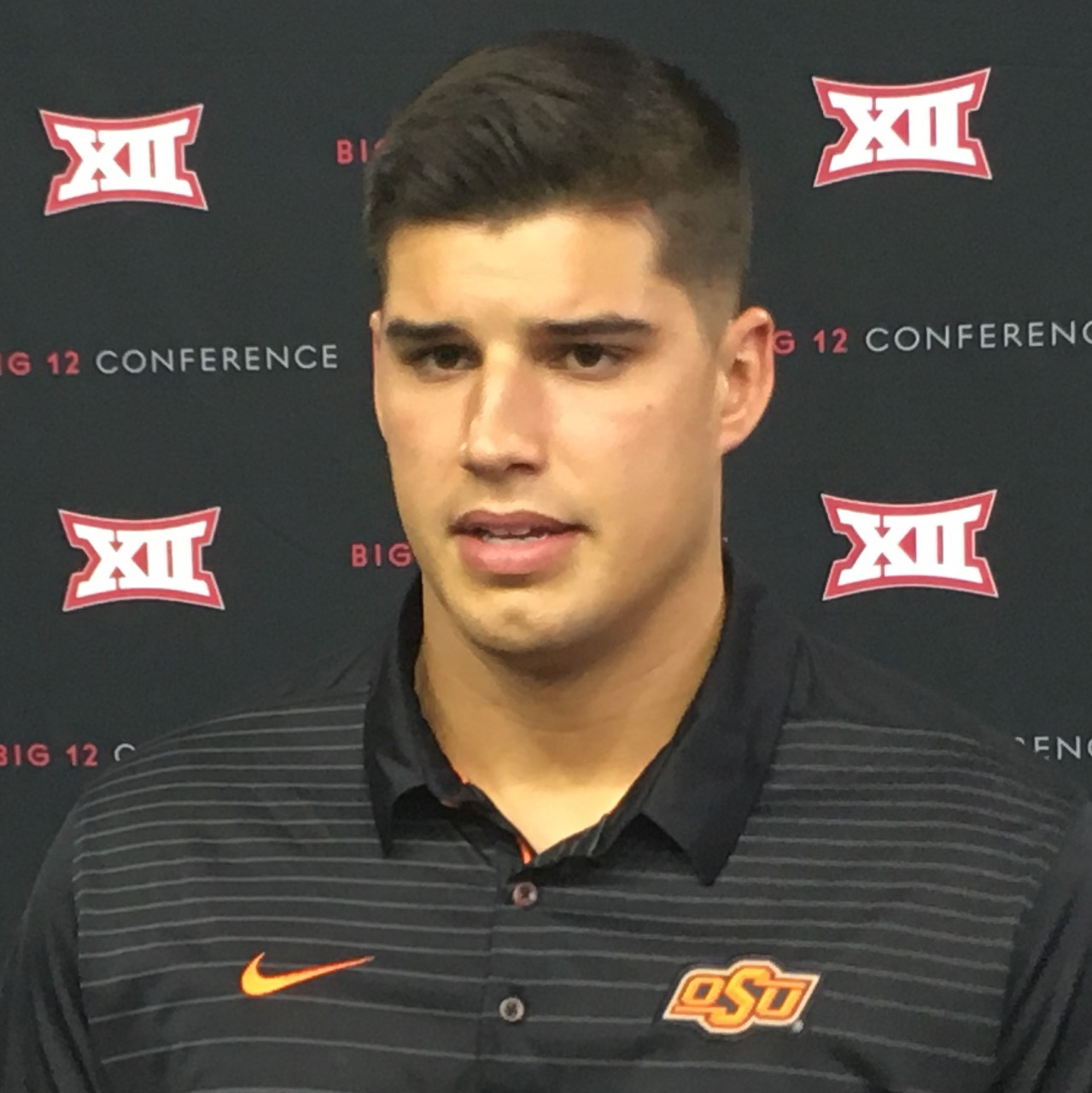
Rudolph during Big 12 Conference media days in 2017

Rudolph entered his true freshman season in 2014 as a third string behind J. W. Walsh and Daxx Garman. After Walsh was injured, Garman became the starter with Rudolph as his backup. After Garman was injured, Rudolph started his first career game against the Baylor Bears. During the game, Rudolph completed 13-of-25 passes for 281 yards, two touchdowns, and two interceptions. He remained the starter for the final two games, including the 2015 Cactus Bowl victory against the Washington Huskies. In three games total, Rudolph completed 49-of-86 passes for 853 yards, six touchdowns, and four interceptions.

Rudolph was named the starter for the 2015 season, a role he held for the remainder of his tenure at Oklahoma State.

In 2017, Rudolph led the NCAA with 4,904 passing yards. He was the recipient of the Johnny Unitas Golden Arm Award which is given annually to the country's outstanding senior college quarterback. He was also awarded the Sammy Baugh Trophy, was named second-team All Big-12, and was the Camping World Bowl MVP.

Rudolph finished his college career starting 41 games, throwing for 13,618 yards, 92 touchdowns, and 26 interceptions. He also rushed for 28 yards and 17 touchdowns.

== Professional career ==
=== Pre-draft ===
Rudolph attended the NFL Scouting Combine and completed most combine drills, but opted to skip the bench press, broad jump, short shuttle, and three-cone drill. On March 15, 2018, he participated at Oklahoma State's pro day and completed the three-cone drill, short shuttle, broad jump, and ran passing drills. Rudolph met with scouts and team representatives from the Pittsburgh Steelers, New York Giants, and Los Angeles Chargers privately after completing his pro day. Rudolph attended private workout and visits with the New England Patriots, Buffalo Bills, New Orleans Saints, Cincinnati Bengals, Steelers, Giants, and Chargers. At the end of the pre-draft process, Rudolph was projected to be a second-round pick by the majority of NFL draft experts and scouts. He was ranked as the sixth best quarterback prospect in the draft by DraftScout.com, Scouts Inc., and Sports Illustrated.

Pre-draft measurables
Height	Weight	Arm length	Hand span	Wingspan	40-yard dash	10-yard split	20-yard split	20-yard shuttle	Vertical jump	Broad jump	Wonderlic
6 ft 4 5/8 in (1.95 m)	235 lb (107 kg)	32 3/8 in (0.82 m)	9 1/8 in (0.23 m)	6 ft 5 7/8 in (1.98 m)	4.90 s	1.63 s	2.88 s	4.56 s	28.5 in (0.72 m)	8 ft 11 in (2.72 m)	28
All values from NFL Combine/Pro Day

=== Pittsburgh Steelers (first stint) ===
==== 2018 season ====
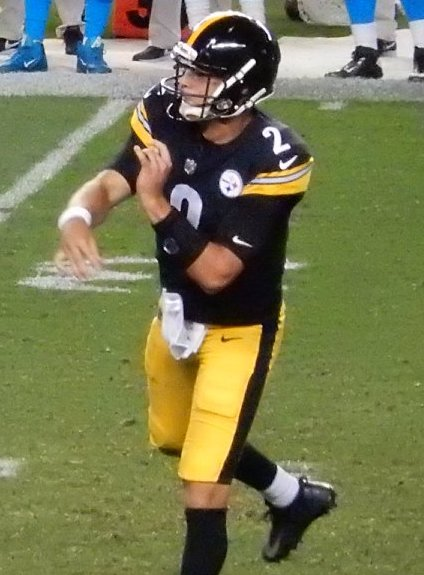
Rudolph in 2018

The Steelers selected Rudolph in the third round (76th overall) of the 2018 NFL draft. They traded their third-round (79th overall) and seventh-round (220th overall) picks to the Seattle Seahawks in order to move up three spots and select Rudolph with the 76th overall pick. He was the sixth quarterback selected in 2018.

On May 23, 2018, the Steelers signed Rudolph to a four-year, $3.92 million contract with a signing bonus of $932,264. Throughout training camp, he competed against Landry Jones and Joshua Dobbs for the backup spot behind Ben Roethlisberger. Head coach Mike Tomlin ultimately named Rudolph the third quarterback, as Jones was released. Rudolph did not receive a single snap as a rookie.

==== 2019 season ====
During the preseason, Rudolph was named the second quarterback behind Ben Roethlisberger, eclipsing Joshua Dobbs after multiple successful preseason performances.

During Week 2 against the Seattle Seahawks, Rudolph made his NFL debut after relieving an injured Roethlisberger in the second half and finished the narrow 28–26 loss with 112 passing yards, two touchdowns, and an interception. Following the announcement that Roethlisberger would miss the rest of the season due to season-ending elbow surgery, Rudolph became the Steelers' starting quarterback. Rudolph made his first NFL start in the next game against the San Francisco 49ers and threw for 174 yards, two touchdowns, and an interception during the 24–20 road loss. The following week against the Cincinnati Bengals on Monday Night Football, Rudolph completed 24-of-28 passes for 229 yards and two touchdowns in the 27–3 victory.

During a Week 5 26–23 overtime loss to the Baltimore Ravens, Rudolph had 131 passing yards and a touchdown before suffering a concussion in the third quarter after being hit by Ravens safety Earl Thomas and was temporarily knocked unconscious, being relieved by Steelers third-string quarterback Devlin Hodges. Rudolph was cleared from concussion protocol on October 16, 2019. He returned in Week 8 against the Miami Dolphins on Monday Night Football and threw for 251 yards, two touchdowns, and an interception during the 27–14 victory. The following week against the Indianapolis Colts, Rudolph completed 26-of-35 passes for 191 yards, a touchdown, and an interception in the narrow 26–24 victory.

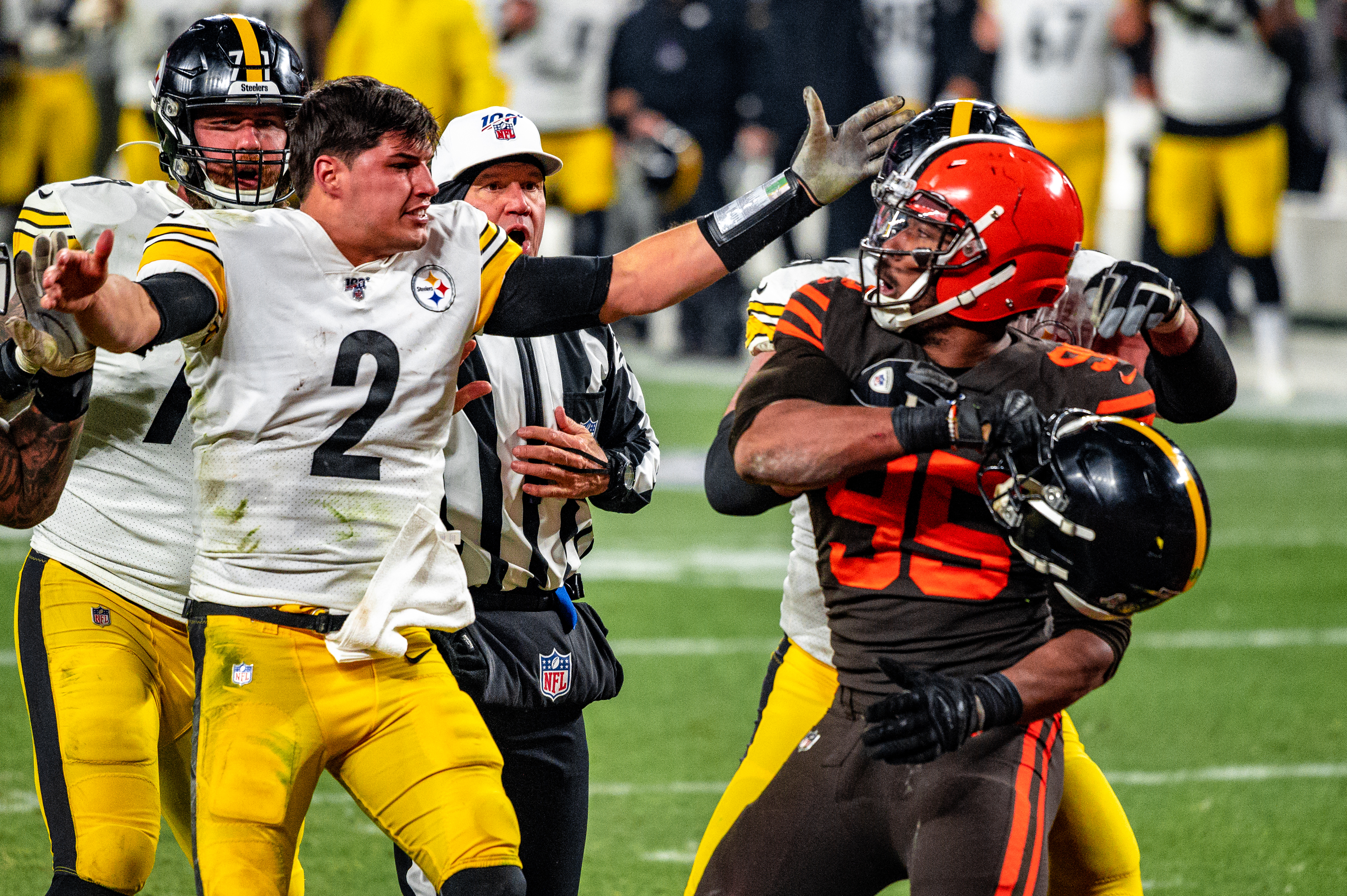
Rudolph reacting to being hit in the head by Myles Garrett with his own helmet

During Week 11 against the Cleveland Browns on Thursday Night Football, with eight seconds left in regulation, Rudolph was involved in a brawl with several players from both teams. Rudolph completed a pass to running back Trey Edmunds. Myles Garrett of the Browns then tackled Rudolph late, after the pass had been completed. While the two were entangled on the ground, Rudolph's glove got stuck to Garrett's helmet. Garrett as a reaction then grabbed at Rudolph's helmet and removed it. When Rudolph ran after Garrett, Garrett struck Rudolph in the head with Rudolph's own helmet. During and after this altercation, additional players came into the fray and further fighting occurred. Rudolph finished the 21–7 road loss with 221 passing yards, a touchdown, and four interceptions. Three players were ejected and later suspended for the incident, particularly Garrett, who was suspended for the rest of the 2019 season. For his role in the scuffle, Rudolph was fined $50,000 by the league. He later declined to file criminal charges, calling the situation an NFL matter. Garrett later claimed that Rudolph used a racial slur in the build-up to the altercation and requested that the league check any audio they had on the field, but an NFL spokesperson said they had no audio, and their investigation had found no such evidence to support Garrett's claim.

During Week 12 against the still-winless Bengals, Rudolph struggled again, throwing for 85 yards and an interception before being benched for Hodges in the third quarter who led the Steelers to a 16–10 comeback victory. Two days later, head coach Mike Tomlin announced that Hodges would remain the starting quarterback for the following week's game against the Browns. During Week 16 against the New York Jets, Rudolph came into the game after struggles from Hodges in the second quarter, completing 14-of-20 passes for 129 yards and a touchdown before leaving the eventual 16–10 loss during the fourth quarter with a shoulder injury. It was later revealed that he suffered a sternoclavicular joint dislocation in his shoulder, and Rudolph was placed on injured reserve on December 24, 2019.

Rudolph finished his second professional season with 1,765 passing yards, 13 touchdowns, and nine interceptions in 10 games and eight starts.

==== 2020 season ====
Rudolph was named second-string quarterback on the depth chart going into the 2020 season behind Ben Roethlisberger, beating out Joshua Dobbs for the backup role.

During a Week 9 24–19 road victory over the Dallas Cowboys, Rudolph came into the game in the second quarter after Roethlisberger suffered an ankle injury. Rudolph completed two of three passes for three yards before Roethlisberger returned in the second half. Rudolph also made appearances in relief of Roethlisberger during the fourth quarter of blowout victories over the Browns, Bengals, and Jacksonville Jaguars.

On December 29, 2020, with the Steelers already locking up the AFC North with a 12–3 record, head coach Mike Tomlin announced that Rudolph would start the regular season finale on the road against the Browns in order to rest Roethlisberger in preparation for the playoffs. In that game, Rudolph completed 22-of-39 passes for 315 yards, two touchdowns, and an interception. With the Steelers down 24–22, Rudolph attempted to tie the score by throwing a two-point conversion to rookie wide receiver Chase Claypool. However, the pass was incomplete, which set up the Browns to run out the clock, ending the game without either team having another scoring play.

Rudolph finished the 2020 season with 324 passing yards, two touchdowns, and an interception in five games and one start.

==== 2021 season ====
Rudolph signed a one-year contract extension with the Steelers on April 29, 2021.

During Week 10 against the Detroit Lions, Rudolph got his first start of the season after Ben Roethlisberger was ruled out with COVID-19. Rudolph finished the 16–16 tie with 242 passing yards, a touchdown, and an interception. During a Week 16 36–10 road loss to the Kansas City Chiefs, he relieved Roethlisberger in the fourth quarter and threw for 35 yards.

Rudolph finished the 2021 season with 277 passing yards, a touchdown, and an interception in two games and one start.

==== 2022 season ====
Following the 2021 season, Ben Roethlisberger retired and the Steelers staff showed confidence in Rudolph. During the offseason, general manager Kevin Colbert stated that the team would "build around" Rudolph.

On September 5, 2022, the official Steelers depth chart was released showing Rudolph being listed at second-string quarterback behind Mitchell Trubisky and ahead of rookie Kenny Pickett. The next day, Rudolph was demoted to third-string quarterback with head coach Mike Tomlin citing a "clerical error" in the original depth chart. Throughout the regular season, Rudolph was relegated to third-string duties and did not receive a single snap.

==== 2023 season ====
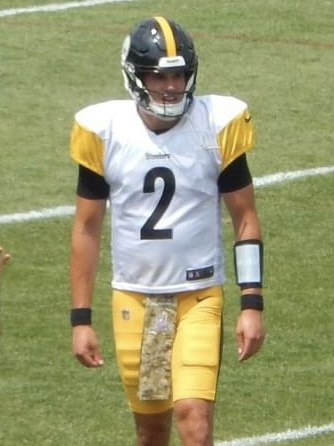
Rudolph in 2023

On May 15, 2023, Rudolph signed a one-year deal with the Steelers for a guaranteed salary of $1.35 million, taking a $2 million cut from his previous contract with the team.

During the preseason, early reports indicated that Rudolph was outperforming Mitchell Trubisky in competition for the backup role. Despite these reports, Rudolph was ultimately named third-string quarterback yet again, where he would receive one rep per practice for much of the season.

During a Week 15 30–13 road loss to the Colts, Rudolph relieved Trubisky in the fourth quarter, completing two of three passes for three yards. Following an injury to Kenny Pickett and poor play by Trubisky, Rudolph was named the starter for the Week 16 matchup against the Bengals. He would go on to have one of his best games as a professional, completing 17 of 27 passes for 290 yards and two touchdowns during the 34–11 victory. Rudolph's performance was the first multiple touchdown outing by one of the three Steelers quarterbacks since Week 3. He also helped break a three game losing streak by the Steelers to move to a team record of 8–7. Rudolph's 290 passing yards were the most by a Steelers quarterback since Week 5 of the 2022 season. Rudolph started again the following week against the Seahawks, completing 18 of 24 passes for 274 yards in the 30–23 road victory.

Although Pickett recovered from his injury, the Steelers opted to start Rudolph in a must-win scenario during the regular season finale against the Ravens. He finished the 17–10 road victory completing 18-of-20 passes for 152 yards, a touchdown, and no interceptions while also setting a single-game franchise record for completion percentage. With Rudolph starting, the Steelers finished the regular season on a three-game winning streak and made the playoffs. He started against the Buffalo Bills during the Wild Card Round, completing 22-of-39 passes for 229 yards, two touchdowns, and an interception in the 31–17 road loss.

Following their playoff exit, Rudolph became a free agent after six seasons with the Steelers.

=== Tennessee Titans ===
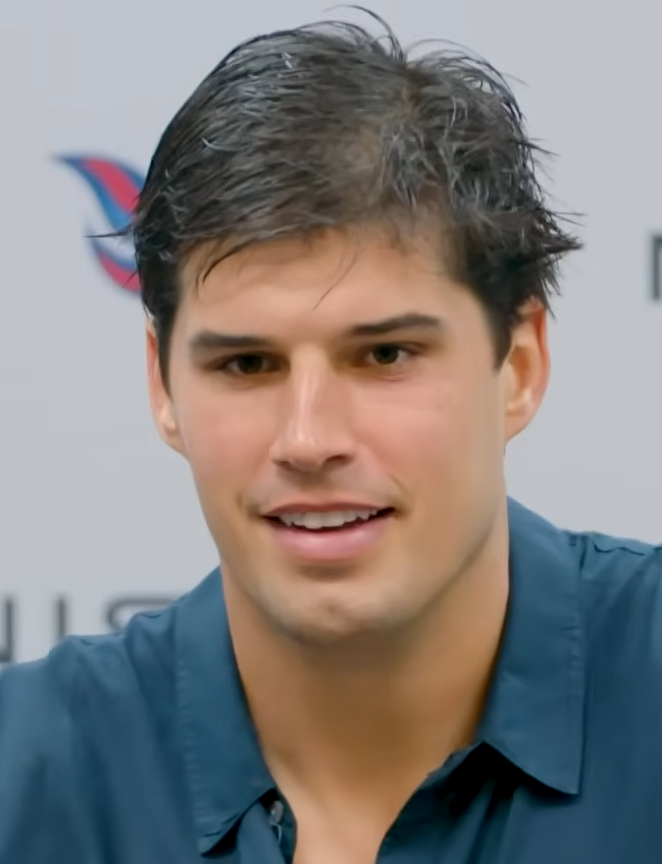
Rudolph in 2024

On March 15, 2024, Rudolph signed a one-year deal with the Tennessee Titans.

Rudolph made his Titans debut in Week 4 against the Dolphins on Monday Night Football. He replaced an injured Will Levis in the first half and led the Titans on seven scoring drives, securing their first win of the season with a 31–12 road victory. Rudolph started in the Week 7 matchup against the Bills after Levis was ruled out with a shoulder injury. During the 34–10 road loss, Rudolph completed 25-of-40 passes for 215 yards and a touchdown.

After a blowout 52–14 road loss to the Lions in Week 8, Rudolph had his statistical best game of the season against the New England Patriots the following week. Rudolph finished the 20–17 overtime victory completing 20-of-33 passes for 240 yards, two touchdowns, and an interception. This marked his first game throwing for multiple touchdowns as a member of the Titans. However, Levis returned to the starting lineup in Week 10 after recovering from injury.

Rudolph made his next appearance in the Week 15 matchup against the Bengals. After Levis threw his third interception of the game, Rudolph was sent in during the third quarter. He completed 21-of-26 passes for 209 yards, two touchdowns, and an interception for a season-high passing rating of 109.5, but the Titans lost 37–27. Rudolph started the next two games against the Colts and Jaguars, both road losses, before alternating with Levis in the season finale against the Houston Texans.

Rudolph finished the 2024 season with 1,450 passing yards, nine touchdowns, and nine interceptions to go along with 25 carries for 106 yards and a touchdown in eight games and five starts.

=== Pittsburgh Steelers (second stint) ===
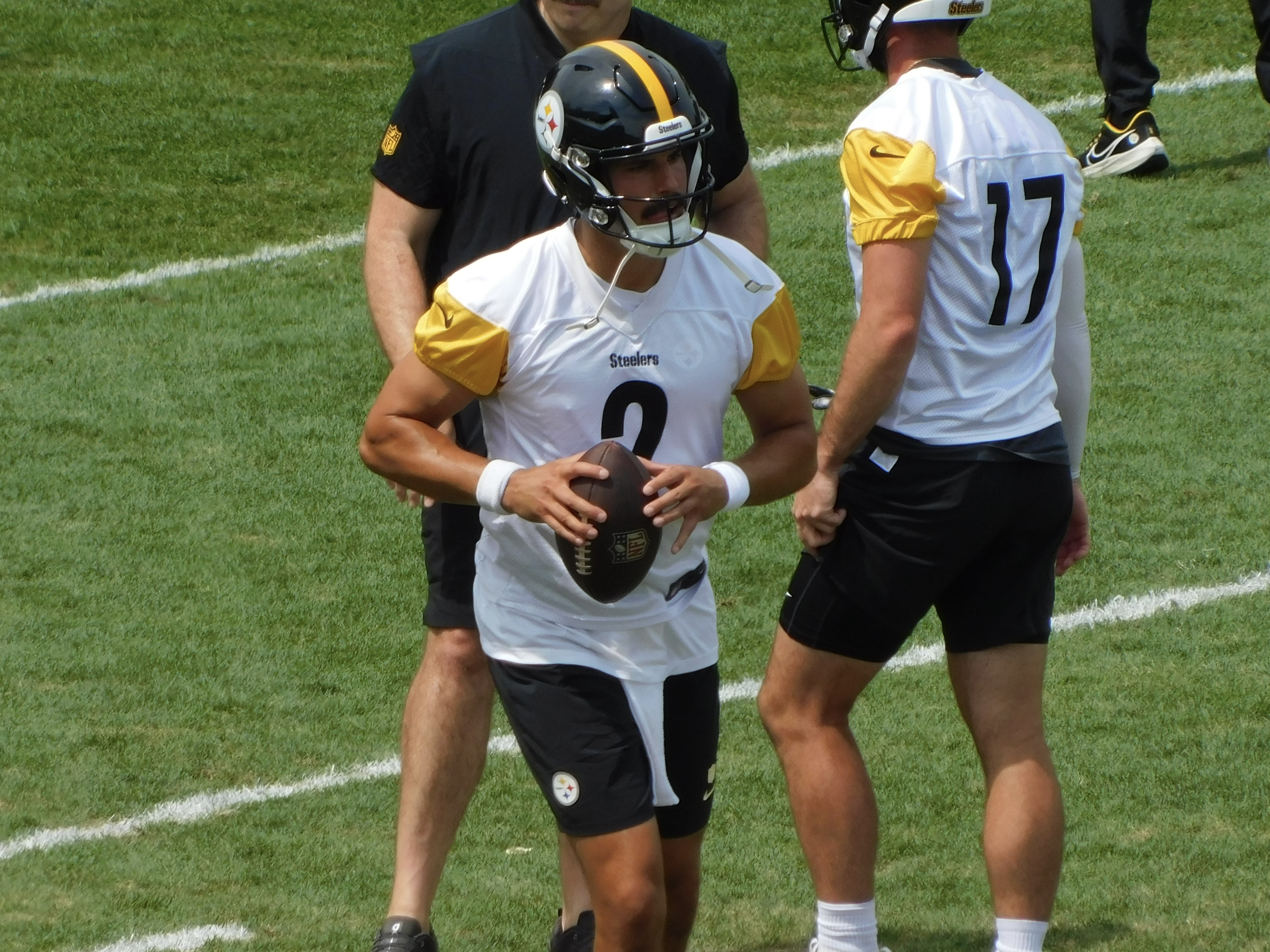
Rudolph at training camp in 2025

On March 13, 2025, Rudolph re-signed with the Steelers on a two-year, $8 million deal.

During a Week 2 31–17 loss to the Seahawks, Rudolph saw the field for the first time with the Steelers since the 2023 season when he relieved Aaron Rodgers late in the game. Rudolph completed both of his passing attempts for 12 yards.

During Week 11 against the Bengals, Rodgers suffered a wrist injury at the end of the first half and was relieved by Rudolph in the second half. Rudolph finished the 34–12 victory completing 12-of-16 passes for 127 yards and a touchdown. Due to Rodgers' injury, Rudolph started the following week against the Chicago Bears, where he completed 24-of-31 passes for 171 yards, a touchdown, and an interception in the 31–28 road loss.

Rudolph finished the 2025 season with 310 passing yards, two touchdowns, and two interceptions in five games and one start. The Steelers finished atop the AFC North with a 10–7 record and qualified for the playoffs as the #4-seed. During the Wild Card Round against the Texans, Rudolph relieved Rodgers at the end of the 30–6 loss and completed his lone pass attempt for two yards.

== Career statistics ==
Legend
**Bold**	Career high

=== NFL ===
==== Regular season ====
Year	Team	Games			Passing									Rushing					Sacks		Fumbles	
Year	Team	GP	GS	Record	Cmp	Att	Pct	Yds	Y/A	Lng	TD	Int	Rtg	Att	Yds	Avg	Lng	TD	Sck	SckY	Fum	Lost
2018	PIT	0	0	—	DNP																	
2019	PIT	10	8	5–3	**176**	**283**	62.2	**1,765**	6.2	76	**13**	**9**	82.0	21	42	2.0	13	0	**15**	**124**	4	0
2020	PIT	5	1	0–1	25	43	58.1	324	7.5	47	2	1	87.7	7	−6	−0.9	1	0	1	8	0	0
2021	PIT	2	1	0–0–1	35	58	60.3	277	4.8	36	1	1	70.8	5	53	**10.6**	**26**	0	0	0	1	0
2022	PIT	0	0	—	DNP																	
2023	PIT	4	3	**3–0**	55	74	**74.3**	719	**9.7**	**86**	3	0	**118.0**	10	8	0.8	7	0	6	43	3	**1**
2024	TEN	8	5	1–4	146	228	64.0	1,530	6.7	47	9	**9**	80.1	**25**	**106**	4.2	14	**1**	11	71	**5**	**1**
2025	PIT	5	1	0–1	38	52	73.1	310	6.0	28	2	2	84.6	7	6	0.9	3	0	2	12	1	**1**
2026	PIT	4	0	0–0	1	4	25.0	2	0.5	2	0	0	39.6	4	10	2.5	9	0	0	0	0	0
Career		38	19	9–9–1	476	742	64.2	4,927	6.6	86	30	22	84.7	79	219	2.8	26	1	35	258	14	3

==== Postseason ====
Year	Team	Games			Passing									Rushing					Sacks		Fumbles	
Year	Team	GP	GS	Record	Cmp	Att	Pct	Yds	Y/A	Lng	TD	Int	Rtg	Att	Yds	Avg	Lng	TD	Sck	SckY	Fum	Lost
2020	PIT	0	0	—	DNP																	
2021	PIT	0	0	—	DNP																	
2023	PIT	1	1	0–1	22	39	56.4	229	5.9	33	2	1	80.0	2	16	8.0	10	0	1	11	0	0
2025	PIT	1	0	0–0	1	1	100.0	2	2.0	2	0	0	79.2	0	0	0	0	0	0	0	0	0
Career		2	1	0–1	23	40	57.5	231	5.8	33	2	1	80.3	2	16	8.0	10	0	1	11	0	0

=== College ===
Legend
Led the NCAA

Season	Team	Games			Passing								Rushing			
Season	Team	GP	GS	Record	Cmp	Att	Pct	Yds	Avg	TD	Int	Rtg	Att	Yds	Avg	TD
2014	Oklahoma State	3	3	2−1	49	86	57.0	853	9.9	6	4	154.0	14	−33	−2.4	0
2015	Oklahoma State	13	12	**10−2**	264	424	62.3	3,770	8.9	21	**9**	149.1	67	−35	−0.5	1
2016	Oklahoma State	13	13	10−3	284	448	63.4	4,091	9.1	28	4	158.9	**83**	**61**	**0.7**	6
2017	Oklahoma State	13	13	10−3	**297**	**457**	**65.0**	**4,904**	**10.0**	**37**	**9**	**170.0**	56	32	0.6	**10**
Career		42	41	32−9	894	1,415	63.1	13,267	9.4	90	26	159.3	220	25	0.1	17

== Personal life ==
Rudolph is the son of Brett and Jamie Rudolph. He is a Christian.

Rudolph grew up family friends with basketball player Luke Maye and quarterback Drake Maye. Their fathers played college football together at North Carolina in the 1980s.
