= W series =

W series or W-series may refer to:

== Transportation ==
- Dodge W series, 4x4 versions of Dodge D series
- GMC W series or Chevrolet W series, versions of the Isuzu Elf trucks
- Kawasaki W series, motorcycles

== Technology ==
- Sony Vaio W series, netbook computers
- Sony Walkman W Series, wearable MP3 players; see List of Sony Walkman products
- Sony Ericsson W series, Sony Ericsson Walkman phones
- ThinkPad W series, Lenovo laptop computers
- W series (satellites), geosynchronous communication satellites

== Other uses ==
- W Series (championship), single-seater racing championship

== See also ==
- W (disambiguation), for series named "W"
