= WWC =

WWC may refer to:

- Walla Walla College, the former name of Walla Walla University
- Warren Wilson College, a private college in North Carolina
- Western Wrestling Conference
- What Works Clearinghouse, an educational initiative in the U.S.
- Whitman-Walker Clinic, an HIV/AIDS medical care organization in Washington, D.C.
- Wizard World Chicago, an annual comic book convention
- Woodrow Wilson Center
- Woolwich railway station, National Rail station code WWC
- Working With Children Check, also abbreviated as WWC, a background check requirement in Australia
- World Water Council
- World Weightlifting Championships
- World Wrestling Championships
- World Wrestling Council, a Puerto Rican pro wrestling promotion
- World Wushu Championships
- Worldways Canada, a former Canadian airline; ICAO airline code WWC

== See also ==
- Women's World Cup (disambiguation)
