= The Eustace Bros. =

- Also known as: Paradise Heights
- Genre: Drama
- Created by: Ashley Pharoah
- Directed by: David Innes Edwards; Ashley Pearce; Paul Harrison; Rob Evans
- Starring: Neil Morrissey; Charles Dale; Ralf Little; Nigel Betts; Lee Oakes; Joanne Froggatt; Pam Ferris; Bruce Byron; David Troughton; Rupert Evans; Lindsey Coulson; Beth Goddard; Matthew Beard
- Composers: Rick Wentworth; Mark Russell
- Country of origin: United Kingdom
- Original language: English
- No. of series: 2
- No. of episodes: 12

Production
- Executive producers: Susan Hogg; Simon Lewis; Ashley Pharoah
- Producer: Polly Hill
- Cinematography: Simon Maggs
- Editors: Colin Goudie; John Parker; William Webb; Tim Murrell
- Running time: 50 minutes
- Production company: BBC Studios

Original release
- Network: BBC One
- Release: 2 July 2002 – 19 August 2003

The Eustace Bros. is a British television drama series, created and principally written by Ashley Pharoah, that first broadcast on BBC One on 2 July 2002. Originally titled Paradise Heights, the series follows the exploits of the Eustace Brothers, Charlie (Neil Morrissey), Clive (Charles Dale) and Richard (Ralf Little), who run a discount warehouse business in Nottingham. Struggling to keep their business afloat, the brothers turn to a local big-shot, Jack Edwards (David Troughton) for help, but find themselves carrying out more and more extreme tasks in order to pay off their debt.

The decision to re-title the series was made following the cliffhanger ending of the first series, in which the Paradise Heights warehouse is burnt to the ground. For the second series, new characters Melissa Garvey (Beth Goddard) and Sam Eustace (Matthew Beard) were added to the cast. Two series of six episodes were broadcast, with the final episode broadcasting on 19 August 2003. The decision to axe the series was made shortly after the second series premiere, which attracted just four million viewers.

Neither series have been released on DVD. As part of the BBC Writer's Room project, the shooting script for the first episode of Paradise Heights is available to download from the Writer's Room website.

== Cast ==
- Neil Morrissey as Charlie Eustace
- Charles Dale as Clive Eustace
- Ralf Little as Richard Eustace
- Nigel Betts as Eddie Aspen
- Lee Oakes as Davey Robinson

=== Paradise Heights ===
- Joanne Froggatt as Julia Sawyer
- Pam Ferris as Marion Eustace
- David Troughton as Jack Edwards
- Rupert Evans as Toby Edwards
- Lindsey Coulson as Claire Eustace
- Bruce Byron as Terry Hennessy
- Marcia Mantack as Angie James
- Mary Tamm as Yvonne Edwards
- Nicky Ladanowski as Mandy Cutler
- Danielle Brown as Kylie James
- Michael Hadley as D.I. Hannington
- Nicholas Harvey as Sam Eustace

=== The Eustace Bros. ===
- Beth Goddard as Melissa Garvey
- Matthew Beard as Sam Eustace

== Episodes ==
=== Series 1: Paradise Heights (2002) ===
No.	Title	Directed by	Written by	Original release date	Viewers (millions)
1	TBA	Ashley Pearce	Ashley Pharoah	2 July 2002	7.05
Local big-shot Jack Edwards, to whom the Eustace's are heavily in debt, intercepts a diesel consignment on its way from France to the warehouse.
2	TBA	Ashley Pearce	Ashley Pharoah	9 July 2002	5.18
The Eustace siblings try to pay off their debt to Jack Edwards with the help of some rare animals and a disreputable vet.
3	TBA	Ashley Pearce	Ashley Pharoah	16 July 2002	4.84
The brothers are persuaded to smuggle immigrants into Britain. The women, meanwhile, have set up a sex chat line.
4	TBA	David Innes Edwards	Adrian Mead	23 July 2002	4.64
An electrocuted cow, a counterfeiting scam and a fright for Charlie punctuate the Eustace's mounting problems.
5	TBA	David Innes Edwards	Ashley Pharoah	30 July 2002	N/A
A face from the past comes back into the Eustace's lives with potentially disastrous consequences.
6	TBA	David Innes Edwards	Ashley Pharoah	6 August 2002	N/A
Life with the Eustaces' is even more chaotic than usual as Julia and Toby's wedding looms.

=== Series 2: The Eustace Bros. (2003) ===
No.	Title	Directed by	Written by	Original release date	Viewers (millions)
1	TBA	David Innes Edwards	Ashley Pharoah	15 July 2003	4.13
The brothers take on a job which sees them up against the armed forces after Charlie falls for a businesswoman.
2	TBA	David Innes Edwards	Ashley Pharoah	22 July 2003	N/A
Melissa and Charlie pretend to be engaged to clinch a deal.
3	TBA	Rob Evans	Adrian Mead	29 July 2003	4.70
Clive's first love reappears, leading him to uncover a secret.
4	TBA	Rob Evans	Ashley Pharoah	5 August 2003	3.80
Dead badgers and aggressive locals hamper the brothers' trip to Somerset.
5	TBA	Paul Harrison	Dan Sefton	12 August 2003	3.60
A job stripping out a mental asylum threatens to divide the brothers, as Clive questions Melissa's role in the business.
6	TBA	Paul Harrison	Ashley Pharoah	19 August 2003	N/A
Clive ponders if he will find love again.
