= W. =

W. may refer to:

- SoHo (Australian TV channel) (previously W.), an Australian pay television channel
- W. (film), a 2008 American biographical drama film based on the life of George W. Bush
- "W.", the fifth track from Codeine's 1992 EP Barely Real

== See also ==
- W
- W (disambiguation)
