= Ishida (company) =

Company in Kyoto, Japan

Ishida Co., Ltd.

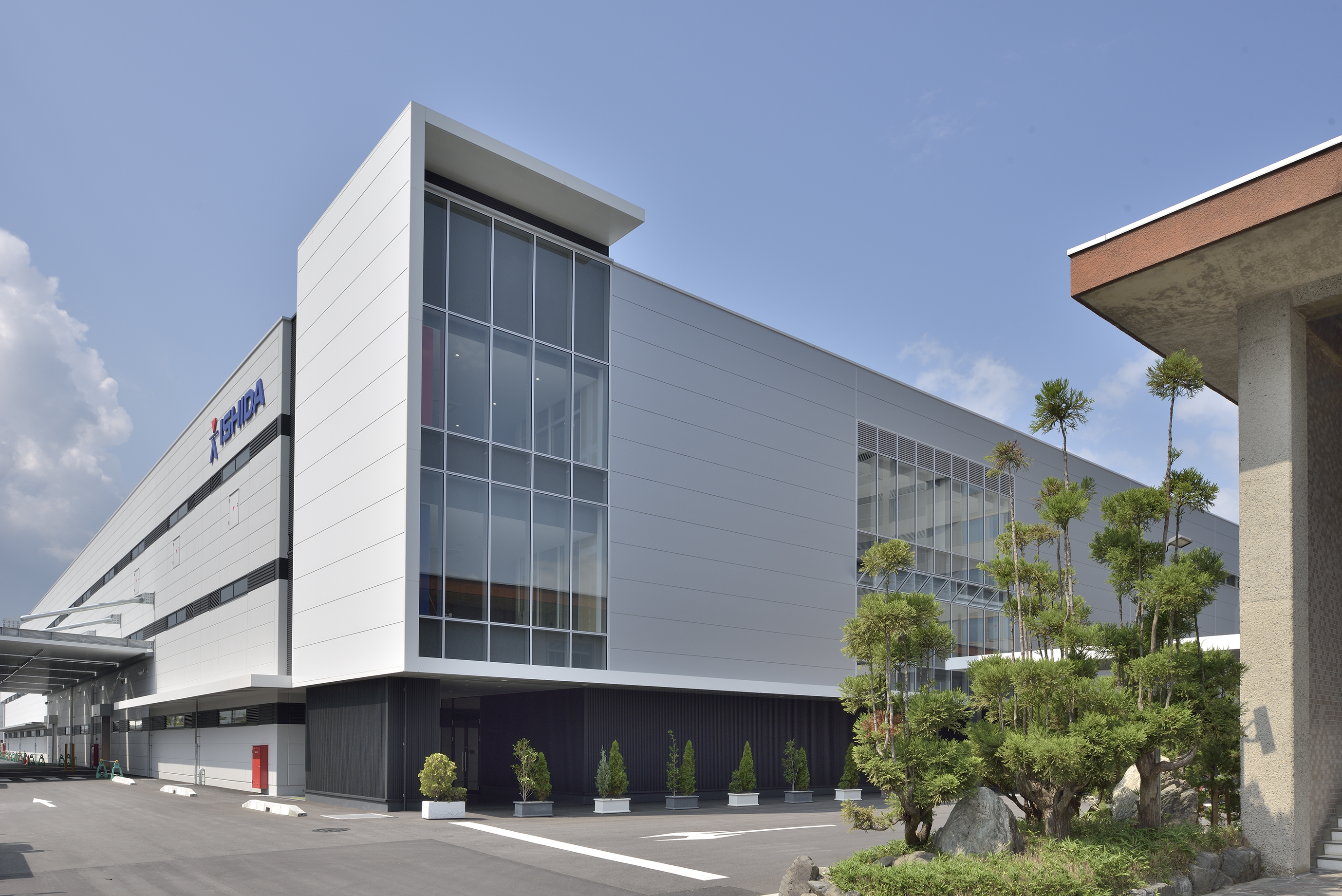
- Shiga facility
- Native name: 株式会社 イシダ
- Company type: Private KK
- Industry: Machinery
- Founded: October 16, 1948; 77 years ago
- Founder: Otokichi II Ishida
- Headquarters: Sakyō-ku, Kyoto, 606-8392, Japan
- Area served: Worldwide
- Key people: Takahide Ishida (President)
- Products: Weighing machinery; Packing machinery; Inspection and quality control systems; Graders and batchers; Packaging lines; Packaging line machinery; Packaging line software
- Revenue: ▲JPY 128.2 billion (FY 2019) (US$ 1.18 billion) (FY 2019)
- Number of employees: 3,688 (as of June 21, 2019)
- Website: Official website

Ishida Co., Ltd. (株式会社 イシダ, Kabushiki-gaisha Ishida) is a Japanese multinational company which manufactures food packing machinery. It has been in business since 1893 and is a privately owned family business. It invented the multihead weigher, for which it enjoys a global market share of 70%. The company also makes weighing, packing and inspection equipment and packing line systems for food and non-food industries.

== History ==
Ishida began manufacturing weighing scales in 1893 in Kyoto under authorization of Japan’s first weights and measures license. In 1948 the company was founded under the name Ishida Scales Mfg. Co. Ltd. by Otokichi II Ishida. In 1972 it invented the multihead weigher and first exported it in 1978. In 1985, the first international subsidiary, Ishida Europe, was founded, followed by subsidiaries in Brazil, Malaysia, China, Thailand, Canada, Korea, Vietnam, Indonesia and India. In 1993 the Company was renamed Ishida. On 19 May 2010, the position of president saw its fourth handover to Takahide Ishida from his father Ryuichi Ishida.

- 1893 - Founded as Ishida Scales Mfg.Co..
- 1972 - World's first computer combination weigher "CCW" revolutionizes the food packaging industry.
- 1975 - Launch of "DACS" checkweigher.
- 1985 - Ishida Europe (GBR) founded.
- 1988 - Daelim Ishida Scales Mfg.Co.(KOR) founded.
- 1990 - Ishida do Brasil (BRA) founded.
- 1991 - Ishida Netherlands (NDR) founded.
- 1992 - Ishida Corporation of America (USA) founded.
- 1993 - Ishida Switzerland (SUI) founded. Launch of “ACP” automatic case packer.
- 1996 - Ishida Malaysia (MYS) founded. Launch of “APEX” VFFS bagmaker.
- 1997 - Ishida Middle East (UAE) founded.
- 2000 - Shanghai Ishida (CHN) and Ishida South Africa(ZAF) founded.
- 2001 - Ishida Thailand (THA) founded.
- 2002 - Ishida Czech (CZE) founded.
- 2003 - Ishida France (FRA) founded.
- 2004 - Launch of "IX" x-ray detection systems.
- 2005 - Ishida Canada (CAN) and Ishida Germany (DEU) founded.
- 2007 - Ishida Korea (KOR) and Ishida India(IND) founded.
- 2008 - Ishida Romania (ROU) founded.
- 2012 - Ishida Indonesia (IDN), Ishida Vietnam(VNM) and Ishida Russia(RUS) founded.
- 2015 - New Shiga integrated facility opened in Japan.

== Products ==
Its range now includes screw feeder weighers and fresh food weighers for sticky and oily products. Ishida also manufactures cut-gate weighers, for granules and powders, machines for separating stacks of food trays (denesters), tray sealers, snack food bagmakers and other packaging line equipment such as conveyors and gantries. Inspection equipment includes checkweighers, X-ray systems, seal testers and vision systems. Ishida also produces software for packing line efficiency optimisation. It remains a manufacturer of scales for retail outlets.

== Operations ==
The first subsidiary company was the UK based Ishida Europe in 1985, which currently operates as the European headquarters. The Americas are served by subsidiaries in the USA, Canada and Brazil and there are subsidiaries in the Middle East and South Africa. Ishida has subsidiaries throughout Asia, including India, China, Korea, Malaysia, Thailand and Vietnam. Manufacturing facilities are currently in the UK, Japan, China, Korea, India and Brazil. Ishida equipment is distributed in Australia primarily by Heat and Control, and in New Zealand by Gilbarco on the retail side and Heat and Control for the manufacturing equipment.
