= Americhem =

American dye manufacturer

Americhem, Inc.
- Formerly: The Caldwell Company
- Type: Private
- Industry: Color and additive masterbatches for polymers and synthetic fibers
- Founded: November 29, 1941; 84 years ago, in Akron, Ohio, US
- Founder: Sylvester S. Caldwell
- Headquarters: Cuyahoga Falls, Ohio, US
- Number of employees: Over 800
- Website: www.americhem.com

Americhem, Inc. established in 1941 in Ohio, Americhem Inc. is a global manufacturer of masterbatches, specializing in custom color and additive solutions. The company's headquarters are located in Cuyahoga Falls, Ohio, with additional manufacturing sites across North America, Europe and Asia.

The company manufactures single pigment dispersions, color and additive concentrates, and custom compounds.

Americhem Inc.'s sister company, Infinity LTL Engineered Compounds, manufactures custom-compounded engineered thermoplastics. It has locations in Swedesboro, New Jersey and Morrisville, Pennsylvania.

In 2016, Americhem Inc. acquired Vi-Chem, a producer of PVC and elastomeric compounds.

== History ==
On November 29, 1941, Alabama native Sylvester S. Caldwell founded The Caldwell Company in Akron, Ohio. The company started as a manufacturer’s representative with Thompson Weinman & Co., a manufacturer in the rubber industry, as the first and principal client.

During World War II, natural rubber became scarce due to rationing. The Caldwell Company took on additional clients including Harmon Color, which marked the company's first experience with colorant. In September 1943, Caldwell Company became incorporated and relocated to its building on Cutler Parkway in Akron.

Richard H. Juve joined the company in June 1953 and introduced a line of stabilizing products to push sales in the rubber industry. He was followed by Harvey E. Cooper, who joined in 1958 as a chemist from Firestone Tire and Rubber Company. Both men acquired equal shares of The Caldwell Company, making them president and vice president of the company.

On September 2, 1959, The Caldwell Company's first manufacturing plant was opened on Home Avenue in Akron. The Caldwell Company changed its name to Americhem Inc. and began regularly producing its products in 1960. With funding from the issuance of bonds, Americhem was able to develop several new commercial products. By the end of 1964, the company was manufacturing color concentrates for ABS, many of which were used for the RV industry. In July 1965, Americhem's headquarters was moved to a new building in Cuyahoga Falls, Ohio. There was an expansion in 1969, when a new plant was purchased in Medina, Ohio, and Americhem designed and manufactured the first masterbatches for vinyl siding. Americhem then became a member of the Vinyl Siding Institute and helped invent tests along with standards for weathering and durability that are still used today.

Americhem was one of the first companies to use IBM System/3 computers and ACS Color Matching computers that were installed in 1972. In 1973, they opened their first plant outside of Ohio, located in Elgin, Illinois. This plant eventually became the new location of the Medina plant. The 1973 oil crisis severely affected Americhem’s sales. During this time, Americhem gained business in the packaging and construction industries. In 1974, part-owner Harvey Cooper retired, leaving ownership of the company to Richard Juve, who became the majority owner.

In 1978, Americhem opened its first research department. The new laboratory led to the production of Americhem’s first color concentrates for synthetic fibers in response to the new developments of nylon and polyester dispersion technology. In 1987, Americhem received "Best Technical Paper" for the presentation "Weathering Metamerism: A Photochemical Process" and again in 1988 for "Refractive Index: A Key to Understanding Color Difference." Around the same time, Americhem purchased Colourfast Plastics Ltd. in England to expand their international presence.

Americhem opened a plant in Concord, North Carolina, in 1989, and on Steels Corners Road in Cuyahoga Falls in 1998.

In 2001, Americhem introduced a polyester solution dye product line for automotive interiors. A plant was opened in 2002, in Dalton, Georgia. The company continued to expand internationally with the establishment of the Luxembourg sales office in 2003, the Mexico City sales office in 2004, and the Suzhou, China plant that was opened in 2006 and expanded in 2014. Americhem introduced the first variegated wood grain products for composite deck board applications in 2005, an outdoor color line for polyester fibers, and a low heat build-up technology for dark construction colors in 2006.

The seventh Americhem plant was opened in 2010 in Liberty, North Carolina, with a specialty of black, white, and additive masterbatch products. In 2011, Americhem Inc. celebrated its 70th anniversary, which was recognized by the governor of Ohio and the mayor of Cuyahoga Falls.

The Queen’s Award for Enterprise was awarded to Americhem for the second time in the category of International Trade in 2012. Americhem also won the Material of the Year award from Material ConneXion in NYC for their photochromatic "blushing bottles."

On December 28, 2012, Americhem Inc. purchased Infinity Compounding in Swedesboro, New Jersey, later changing its name to Americhem Infinity Engineered Compounds. In 2014, the Americhem Manchester, U.K. factory was granted ISO/TS 16949 certification. The Cuyahoga Falls plant received ISO 14001 environmental certification in 2014.

In December 2014, Americhem purchased LTL Color Compounders. LTL was merged with Americhem Infinity to form Infinity LTL Engineered Compounds. In March 2016, Americhem acquired Vi-Chem Corporation of Grand Rapids, Michigan, a producer of PVC and elastomeric compounds, specializing in "soft touch" technology for the automotive industry.

== Americhem products ==
Americhem manufactures color and additive masterbatches (also known as concentrates) for use in the plastics and synthetic fibers industries. Most of the company's products are made for specific customers and specific applications. Americhem also makes single pigment dispersions, which are used as a stand-alone product or as a mix. Additives can be included with the color concentrates, including but not limited to antioxidants, UV stabilizers, flame retardants, slip and antistatic agents, optical brighteners, antimicrobials and nucleating agents.

Vi-Chem Corporation is a manufacturer of custom thermoplastic compounds and polymeric alloys, delivering value-added compounded products for injection molders, blow molders, and extrusion operations. Vi-Chem maintains the ISO/TS 16949 automotive manufacturing standard as well as the ISO/IEC 17025 testing laboratory certification.

== Locations ==
- Cuyahoga Falls, Ohio – Americhem World Headquarters
- Concord, North Carolina
- Liberty, North Carolina
- Mansfield, Texas
- Dalton, Georgia
- Manchester, United Kingdom
- Suzhou, China
- Swedesboro, New Jersey
- Morrisville, Pennsylvania
- Grand Rapids, Michigan
- Pune, India
