= Irisys =

British technology and engineering company

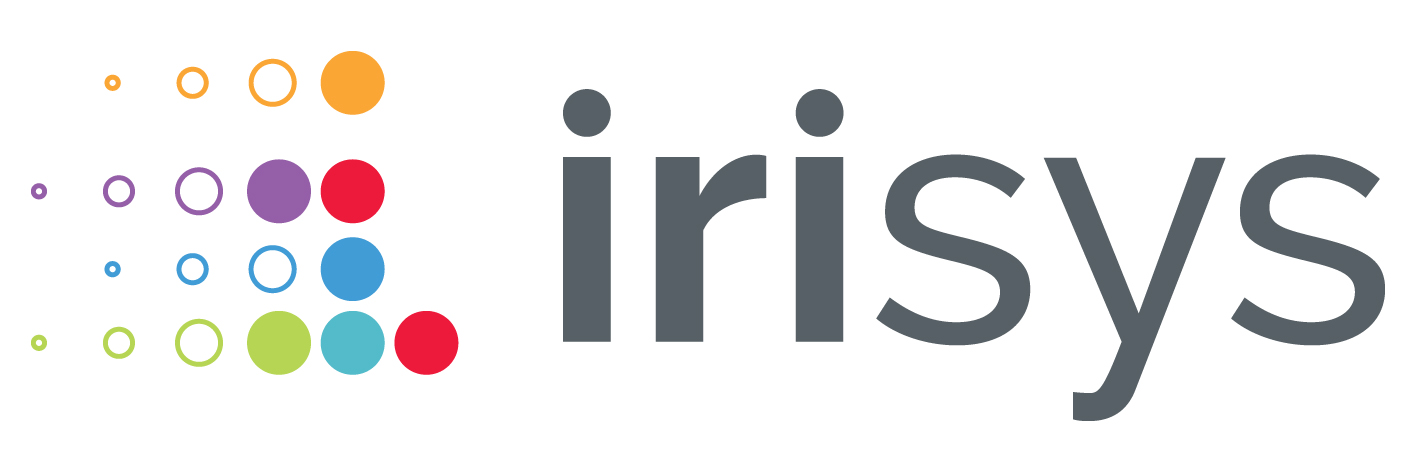
- Type: Subsidiary
- Industry: Technology
- Founded: 1996
- Headquarters: Northampton, UK
- Products: thermal imaging, infrared
- Number of employees: 136 (2022)
- Parent: Fluke Corporation
- Website: www.irisys.net

Infrared Integrated Systems Ltd (generally called Irisys) is a technology and engineering company based near Northampton in the United Kingdom that manufacturers thermal imaging, people counting technologies and real-time grocery queue management systems. The company was acquired by the American Fluke Corporation in 2012.

The company was awarded The Queen’s Award for Enterprise, the highest official award for British businesses, in 2011 and 2012.

== History ==
Irisys was founded in 1996 by a small group of scientists and engineers, who had previously worked at the Plessey Caswell research labs in Northamptonshire, predominantly on high-resolution military infrared imaging systems. Irisys originally aimed to adapt the technology to the requirements of the commercial fire and security markets. Military detectors typically cost tens of thousands of dollars, but Irisys aimed to produce much cheaper devices by trading a reduction in resolution for lower manufacturing costs, and so the company decided on a resolution of 256 pixels using a 16x16 sensor array.

Irisys began to manufacture a range of infrared cameras used in applications such as measuring heat loss from buildings, but quickly realized that the technology behind tracking people for security purposes could also be applied to other sectors. Counting people and queues in retail and other social environments were the first of these new areas to be commercially exploited by Irisys, and the company continues to research and develop novel application areas.

In 2006, Irisys' queue management product IRISYS SMARTLANE won the Retail Week Customer Service Initiative of the Year.

In June 2012, Irisys was acquired by Fluke Corporation.

In May 2023, Irisys issued an end-of-sale and end-of-life notice for their hardware products.

== Application areas ==
Irisys applies its technology to four main sectors:

- People counting
- Queue management
- Security
- Smart buildings

=== People counting and grocery queue management ===
In 2006, Tesco CEO Sir Terry Leahy credited the thermal imaging cameras as being a key factor in the company’s half-year pre-tax profits rising ten per cent. Leahy commented, “We can monitor and manage the service customers get much more precisely – by customer, by store and by the minute. Thanks to this, a quarter of a million more customers every week don’t have to queue.”

In 2008, Kroger implemented Irisys thermal imaging technology. Senior Vice President of Retail Operations, Marnette Perry credited the people counting devices for helping reduce customer wait times from four minutes to less than 30 seconds.

In 2013, grocery store Ralphs installed Irisys infrared cameras and body heat detectors to measure foot traffic in nearly all its supermarkets.

In 2013, Hawaii-based Foodland installed Irisys thermal people counting and check-out management sensors, detecting shoppers throughout its stores to help optimize its staffing.

=== Security and smart buildings ===
Irisys infrared detectors are also widely used in buildings to provide virtual control points with barrier-less entry, such as for bank branch staff doors; and to monitor one-way doors and corridors to ensure passengers do not move in the wrong direction; as well as to prevent ‘tailgating’, where two or more people may attempt to pass through a barrier using a single person’s security pass.

In 2013, Irisys expanded its Smart Buildings products to the U.S. market.
