= Daxx Garman =

American football player (born 1993)

No. 12, 18
- Position: Quarterback

Personal information
- Born: February 18, 1993 (age 33); Oklahoma City, Oklahoma, U.S.
- Listed height: 6 ft 1 in (1.85 m)
- Listed weight: 205 lb (93 kg)

Career information
- High school: Southlake Carroll (Southlake, Texas)
- College: Arizona (2011); Oklahoma State (2012–2014); Maryland (2015)
- Stats at ESPN

Daxx Garman (born February 18, 1993) is an American former college football quarterback. He played for the Arizona Wildcats, Oklahoma State Cowboys, and Maryland Terrapins.

== Early life ==
Garman attended Southlake Carroll High School in Southlake, Texas. However, Garman never played football for the school, as he transferred in for his senior season, but was ruled ineligible to play. He made an appeal to be reinstated to the team, but it was declined. He previously attended Jones High School in Jones, Oklahoma, where he threw for 2,311 yards and 24 touchdowns as a junior. At the conclusion of his high school career, Garman committed to play college football at the University of Arizona.

== College career ==
Garman redshirted in 2011, before transferring to Oklahoma State University to play for the Oklahoma State Cowboys. After not playing in 2012 and 2013, he entered the 2014 season as the backup to J. W. Walsh. Against Missouri State, Walsh exited the game with a lower leg injury. Garman entered the game in Walsh's place, throwing for 244 yards and two touchdowns, leading the Cowboys to a 40–23 victory. Following the game, he was named the team's starting quarterback. In his first career start against UTSA, he threw for 315 yards and two touchdowns. In his second start against Texas Tech, Garman recorded a career-high 370 passing yards and four touchdowns, while also rushing for a score, in a 45–35 win. Against Texas, he was sacked seven times, and he began to experience concussion symptoms, leading Mason Rudolph to start for the Cowboys. He finished the 2014 season throwing for 2,041 yards with 12 touchdowns and 12 interceptions, before announcing his decision to transfer for a second time. For the 2015 season, Garman transferred to the University of Maryland, College Park to play for the Maryland Terrapins. He served as a backup, appearing in two games, before undergoing a season-ending surgery on his shoulder.

Garman finished his career throwing for 2,156 yards, 13 touchdowns, and 13 interceptions.

=== Statistics ===
Year	Team	Games			Passing								Rushing			
Year	Team	GP	GS	Record	Comp	Att	Pct	Yards	Avg	TD	Int	Rate	Att	Yards	Avg	TD
2011	Arizona	Redshirt (redshirt)														
2012	Oklahoma State	DNP														
2013	Oklahoma State	DNP														
2014	Oklahoma State	9	8	4–4	152	277	54.9	2,041	7.4	12	12	122.4	60	-17	-0.3	1
2015	Maryland	2	0	–	6	18	33.3	115	6.4	1	1	94.2	11	-13	-1.2	0
Career		11	8	4−4	158	295	53.6	2,156	7.3	13	13	120.7	71	-30	-0.4	1
