= Deep Sea Electronics =

Control panel for a diesel generator by Deep Sea Electronics

Deep Sea Electronics (DSE), a North Yorkshire based company, is engaged in the manufacturing of generator controllers, auto transfer switch controllers, battery chargers and vehicle & off-highway controllers.

The Company was founded in 1975 and was bought out by Caledonia Investments
