= WCW (disambiguation) =

WCW refers to World Championship Wrestling, a defunct American professional wrestling promotion.

WCW may also refer to:

- World Championship Wrestling (Australia), a defunct Australian professional wrestling promotion
- Witchcraft Works, a manga and anime series
- William Carlos Williams (1883–1963), American poet
- The World Can't Wait, left-wing protest group
- Whitechapel Computer Works, a computer company
- What Chilli Wants, a VH1 reality show
- NEW (TV station), which had the pre-launch callsign of WCW

== See also ==
- World Wrestling Championships
