= Columbia Water Center =

Research institute in New York, U.S

Coordinates: 40.80945°N 73.95999°W

The Columbia Water Center
- Type: Non-profit research institute
- Founded: 2008; 18 years ago
- Headquarters: New York City, US
- Key people: Upmanu Lall, Director
- Parent: Columbia Climate School
- Website: www.water.columbia.edu

The Columbia Water Center (CWC) was established in January 2008 by Columbia University as part of the Earth institute to research and address global water-related challenges, including water scarcity, access and quality alongside Climate risks and changes. In 2021, it became a research unit of the Columbia Climate School.

Its stated mission is to "creatively tackle water challenges of a rapidly changing environment and Earth’s biodiversity contribution of humanity’s carbon footprint affecting the water including climate change affecting food, energy, ecosystems and urbanization," by combining "the rigor of scientific research with the impact of effective policy."

The Center takes a multidisciplinary approach to its mission, employing hydrologists, climatologists, environmental engineers, and water policy analysts. Its director is Upmanu Lall, the Alan & Carol Silberstein Professor of Engineering at Columbia University.

The Center currently divides its projects into five themes: America's Water, The Global Floods Initiative, Data Analytics and Multi-Scale Predictions, Risk and Financial Instruments and the Water, Food, Energy Nexus.

== Background ==
The Earth Institute, under the leadership of Jeff Sachs, is a research institution that supports sustainable development from various angles.

In 2008, the PepsiCo Foundation awarded the Earth Institute $6 million to address these water-related issues. The PepsiCo grant led to the establishment of the Columbia Water Center under the leadership of Columbia University engineering professor Upmanu Lall. This three-year grant made possible projects in four countries: India, China, Mali, and Brazil.

In Brazil, CWC has partnered with the Federal University of Ceará in the northeast to focus on sophisticated climate-based forecasting systems used for water allocation decisions across diverse use sectors. In addition, the CWC team recently completed a municipal water plan (PAM) for Milhã, a rural area in central Ceará. The project outlines a plan for the municipality to deliver water to all of its 14,000 residents.

As part of the project, the CWC designed and built water infrastructure demonstration projects for Ingá and Pedra Fina, two communities in Milhã. The project provides water to 500 people in the area.

In India, the project focuses on reducing water consumption in the agricultural sector by encouraging sustainable crop choice patterns, as well as working with corporations to deploy better irrigation technologies (and increase reliability) throughout their supply chains. A key objective is to reduce the groundwater stress in the region. Primary project locations are in the states of Punjab and Gujarat.

In Punjab, the CWC has partnered with Punjab Agricultural University to come up with innovative solutions to reduce farmer irrigation. Some of the methods developed (including the use of inexpensive tensiometers to measure soil moisture and direct seeding of rice) were field tested in the 2010 planting season with over 500 farmers participating. The Punjab Agricultural University team reports that participating farmers saved 25 to 30 percent of their normal water use by implementing the new approaches. The CWC/PAU team plans to scale up the pilot project in 2011 by recruiting 5,000 rice farmers to use tensiometers.

In Gujarat, the Columbia Water Center is working with the state government to reform electricity subsidies to provide a greater incentive for farmers to conserve water. In conjunction with subsidy reform, the CWC is also piloting water saving technologies among farmers.

The work in Mali coincides with the Millennium Villages Project. CWC is focusing on designing irrigation and cropping systems that can be operated and maintained locally in order to provide farmers with higher-value cash crops. The center has installed large pumps that improved the amount of water available. Projects emphasize bringing together local partners, market forces and public-private partnerships.
