= Westminster Catawba Christian School =

Location
- 2650 India Hook Rd; Rock Hill, South Carolina 29732; United States; 34°58′47″N 81°01′21″W

Information
- Type: Private, Christian school
- Religious affiliation: Christian
- Denomination: Ministry of Westminster Presbyterian Church
- Founder: Westminster Presbyterian Church
- Head of school: Dr. Bill Mott (interim)
- Enrollment: 800
- Colors: Blue and gold
- Athletics conference: NCISAA for 2025-2026. Moving to SCISA in 2026-2027.
- Nickname: Indians
- Accreditations: Association of Christian Schools International (ACSI), Cognia
- Website: www.wccs.org

Westminster Catawba Christian School (WCCS) is a private Christian school located in Rock Hill, South Carolina.

A religious ministry started by Westminster Presbyterian Church, WCCS has two campuses. The lower campus is for infants through 5th grade. The upper campus is for 6–12 grade.

Notable attendees are: Mason Rudolph
