= Women's World Cup =

The Women's World Cup may refer to:

- FIFA Women's World Cup (association football)
- 1970 Women's World Cup (association football)
- 1971 Women's World Cup (association football)
- Mundialito (women) (association football, 1981–1988)
- UCI Women's Road World Cup (cycling)
- Women's Cricket World Cup
- Women's Cricket T20 World Cup
- Women's Rugby World Cup (rugby union)
- Women's Rugby League World Cup
- Women's World Cup of Golf
- Bandy World Cup Women
- Women's FIH Hockey World Cup (field hockey)
