= WCC =

WCC may refer to:

== Colleges ==
=== Community colleges ===
- Washtenaw Community College, near Ann Arbor, Michigan
- Waubonsee Community College, near Chicago, Illinois
- Wayne Community College, Goldsboro, North Carolina
- Westchester Community College, Valhalla, New York
- Whatcom Community College, Bellingham, Washington
- Windward Community College, Kāneʻohe, Hawaiʻi
- Woodland Community College, Woodland, California

=== Other colleges ===
- Waverley Christian College, Melbourne, Australia
- West Cheshire College, vocational college in England
- Westminster Choir College, music conservatory in Princeton, New Jersey
- Women's Christian College, Chennai, Tamil Nadu, India
- William Clarke College, New South Wales, Australia
- Wyoming Catholic College, Lander, Wyoming

== Sport ==
- World Cycling Centre, a training facility for racing cyclists in Aigle, Switzerland
- WCC Team, women's cycling team affiliated with the World Cycling Centre

=== Competitions ===
- Western Canadian Championships, Gaelic Athletic Association tournaments, played in Canada
- Western Canada Cup, ice hockey tournament for Canada's four western provinces
- Wife-Carrying Championship
- World Chess Championship
- World Conker Championships
- World Club Challenge, annual rugby league football competition
- World Constructors' Championship, award for the most successful Formula One constructor in a season
- World Curling Championship
- World Cycling Championship
- WWE Cruiserweight Championship (1991–2007), a professional wrestling title

=== Conferences ===
- West Coast Conference, an NCAA collegiate athletic conference
- Wisconsin Collegiate Conference
- World Canals Conference

== Companies ==
- West Coast Choppers, a company best known for selling chopper-style motorcycles
- West Coast Customs, a car remodeling company
- Western Cartridge Company, a manufacturer of small arms and ammunitions founded in 1898

== Organizations ==
- World Cultural Council, international organization of science and arts.
- Citizens' Councils, former American white supremacist groups
- Westchester Country Club, a private golf club in Harrison, New York
- Wiccan Church of Canada
- Women in Cinema Collective, an Indian organization for women in Malayalam cinema
- World Cat Congress
- World Children's Choir
- World Chlorine Council, an international network of national and regional Chloralkali process associations
- Women's Classical Caucus, a US academic classical feminist organization
- Women's Classical Committee UK, a UK academic classical feminist organization
- World Council of Churches, an international Christian ecumenical organization
- World Crafts Council

== Politics and government ==
- World Constitutional Convention, 1968 meeting of world delegates
- Warwickshire County Council, England
- Wellington City Council, local government of Wellington City, New Zealand
- Western Canada Concept, a Canadian political party
- Wexford County Council, Ireland
- Wiltshire County Council, England
- Worcestershire County Council, England
- Wolverhampton City Council, England
- World Climate Conference

== Other meanings ==
- Wound Care Certified. Wound Care Nurse Certification; see list of nursing credentials
- Watcom C Compiler
- WCC (radio station), a ship-to-shore radio station originally in Chatham, Massachusetts
- Washington Conservation Corps, a subagency of the Washington State Department of Ecology
- Weak central coherence theory, a concept related to autism
- WebSphere Customer Center, IBM software product now branded as IBM InfoSphere MDM Server
- Weighted companion cube, an item/"character" from the computer game Portal
- White Cell Count
- Woodbury Country Club, a private golf club in Woodbury, New Jersey
- World Christian Conference, an annual conference that is held near Santa Cruz, California
- World Commerce Center, a commercial development near St. Augustine, Florida
