= CW =

CW may stand for:

== Science and technology ==
- Centiwatt (cW), one hundredth of a watt
- Cω, a programming language
- CW complex, a type of topological space
- Carrier wave, a periodic waveform that is modulated in radio communication
- CodeWarrior, an integrated development environment
- Constructed wetland, wastewater treatment landform
- Continuous wave, electromagnetic wave of constant amplitude and frequency
- ClarisWorks, a software suite renamed AppleWorks
- $c_{\rm w}$, a drag coefficient used a measure of air resistance
- Contention window, a network traffic characteristic; see IEEE 802.11e-2005 § Enhanced distributed channel access (EDCA)
- Corded Ware culture, archaeological culture in Europe
- Tungsten carbide, alternative chemical formula CW

== Arts and media ==
=== Gaming ===
- Castle Wolfenstein
- Cube World
- Content Warning

=== Publications ===
- Computerworld
- The Crimson White, University of Alabama student newspaper

=== Other media ===
- The CW, American television network/programming service
  - The CW Plus, national feed of the network
  - CW Sports, sports programming division of the network
  - The CW4Kids, American Saturday morning cartoon children's television block
  - The CW Daytime, afternoon programming block that was broadcast on the CW
- Creative writing
- CloverWorks, Japanese animation studio

== Companies ==
- Cable & Wireless plc, British telecommunications company
- Camping World
- Colonial Williamsburg
- Curtiss-Wright, engineering company

== Military ==
- Camp Wallace, United States Army facility
- Chemical warfare
- Chemical weapon
- Chief warrant officer
- Cold War, the state of geopolitical tension following World War II

== Places ==
- Cook Islands, FIPS and superseded NATO code CW
- CW postcode area around Crewe, England
- Canada West, obsolete designation for the western part of Canada
- Canada's Wonderland, amusement park
- County Carlow, Ireland
- Curaçao, a country
  - ISO 3166-2:CW, country code
- Calw, Germany
- Chelmsley Wood, England

== Other uses ==
- Air Marshall Islands, IATA code CW
- Calendar week
- Christian Worship: A Lutheran Hymnal, used by the WELS
- Clockwise
- Common Worship, a liturgy of the Church of England
- Conventional wisdom
- Cruiserweight (boxing), weight class
- Content warning
- Culture war, a cultural conflict between social groups
- C. W. Anderson (born 1970), professional wrestler
- .cw, Internet top-level domain
- Cawang railway station, Jakarta, Indonesia
- Cool white (about 4100 degrees Kelvin), a color temperature used for lighting; see Fluorescent-lamp formats
