= W (disambiguation) =

W, or w, is the twenty-third letter of the English alphabet.

W may also refer to:

== Arts and entertainment ==
=== Books and magazines ===
- W (magazine), an American fashion magazine
- W, or the Memory of Childhood, a 1975 novel by Georges Perec
- W Publishing, formerly Word Publishing, an imprint of Thomas Nelson
- "W" Is for Wasted, the twenty-third novel in Sue Grafton's "Alphabet mystery" series, published in 2013

=== Film and television ===
- W (1974 film), a suspense American film
- W (2014 film), a thriller Hindi language film
- W (2022 film), a Finnish dystopian experimental film
- W. (film), a 2008 film about United States President George W. Bush by Oliver Stone
- W (TV series), a 2016 South Korean television series
- Kamen Rider W, a 2009–10 Japanese tokusatsu drama
- W, the production code for the 1966 Doctor Who serial The Massacre of St Bartholomew's Eve

=== Music ===
- Wumpscut, an electro-industrial music project sometimes referred to as :w:
- W (group), a Japanese pop music duo
- The W, a studio album by the Wu-Tang Clan
- W (Wanessa Camargo album), 2005
- W (Planningtorock album), 2011
- W (Whigfield album), 2012
- "W", a song by Koffee
- W (Boris album), 2022

=== Broadcasting ===
- Channel W, a defunct Malaysian television channel
- W Network, a Canadian cable television specialty channel
- W Channel (Australia), an Australian pay television channel
- U&W, formerly W, a UK and Ireland general entertainment channel
- W, the initial call sign letter for most U.S. radio and television stations east of the Mississippi River

== Organizations and businesses ==
- Mississippi University for Women, US, nickname "The W"
- W Hotels, a brand of hotels of Marriott International
  - W Las Vegas, a hotel on the Las Vegas Strip
- W Motors, a UAE-based sports car company
- Wayfair (NYSE stock symbol: W)
- Women's National Basketball Association, also nicknamed "The W"
- World Balance, a shoe company
- Big W, an Australian discount department store, and subsidiary of Woolworths Group

== Science and technology ==
- Watt (W), the SI derived unit for power
- Tungsten, symbol W, a chemical element
- W band, a radio band ranging from 75 to 111 GHz
- Work (physics) (symbol: W), in physics
- Tryptophan (single-letter abbreviation: W), an amino acid
- Haplogroup W, a human mitochondrial DNA (mtDNA) haplogroup
- W chromosome
- Lambert W function, a set of functions where w is any complex number
- Weierstrass function (nowhere-differentiable function), a real function continuous everywhere but differentiable nowhere
- W and Z bosons, subatomic particles
- Wurtzite crystal structure (prefix w-)
- Weight (W)
- W state a type of quantum entanglement

=== Computing ===
- w (Unix), a command to list logged in users on Unix-like systems
- W Window System, a graphical windowing system for Unix platforms
- Algorithm W, or the Hindley–Milner type inference algorithm

== Transportation ==
- W (Los Angeles Railway), a line operated by the Los Angeles Railway from 1920 to 1956
- W (New York City Subway service), a New York City Subway service
- W (tram), a class of electric trams built by the Melbourne & Metropolitan Tramways Board
- The official West Japan Railway Company service symbol for:
  - Kisei Main Line.
  - San'yō Main Line.
- Sidoarjo and Gresik (vehicle registration prefix W)

== Other uses ==
- W postcode area, of London
- W National Park, a major national park in West Africa
- Five Ws, of journalism: who, what, when, where, and why
- West, one of the four cardinal directions
- Voiced labial-velar approximant [w], in the International Phonetic Alphabet
- George W. Bush (born 1946), 43rd President of the United States, nickname "W"
- Cubs Win Flag, a flag flown by the Chicago Cubs after winning a home game
- W, or Whiskey, the military time zone code for UTC−10:00

== See also ==
- °W (disambiguation)
- Win (disambiguation)
- VV (disambiguation)
- UU (disambiguation)
- W. (disambiguation)
- ₩, the currency symbol for the Korean won
- W series (disambiguation)
