= CWC Group =

CWC Group Limited
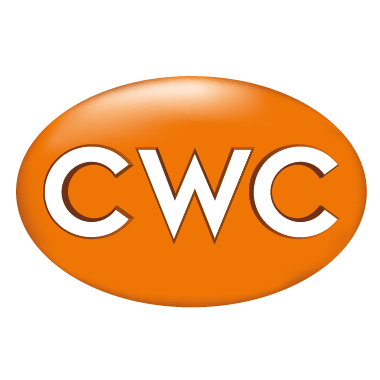
- Company type: Limited company
- Founded: 1997
- Headquarters: UK
- Services: Conferences, Exhibitions, Training courses
- Website: www.thecwcgroup.com

CWC Group Limited is an energy and infrastructure conference, exhibition and training company that was established in 1997 by Tim Clark, Alirio Parra and Lisa Shelton.

CWC Group Limited provides international business executives with Government summits, International industry conferences, Exhibitions, Private retreats, Roadshows, Bespoke consultancy, Recruitment Fairs, Recruitment Process Outsourcing, Public training courses and In-house training courses.

In 2007 and 2011, CWC Group Limited won the Queen's Award For Enterprise – International Trade
