= List of companies of South Africa =

Location of South Africa

South Africa is the southernmost country in Africa. It is the 25th-largest country in the world by land area, and with close to 60 million people, is the world's 24th-most populous nation.

The World Bank classifies South Africa as an upper-middle-income economy, and a newly industrialised country. Its economy is the largest in Africa, and the 34th-largest in the world. In terms of purchasing power parity, South Africa has the seventh-highest per capita income in Africa. However, poverty and inequality remain widespread, with about a quarter of the population unemployed and living on less than US$1.25 a day. Nevertheless, South Africa has been identified as a middle power in international affairs, and maintains significant regional influence.

For further information on the types of business entities in this country and their abbreviations, see "Business entities in South Africa".

== Largest companies ==
Name	Founded	Industry	Revenue (2018)	Headquarters	Market Value (2018)	Ref(s)
Anglo American	1917	Diversified Metals & Mining	$27.6 billion	Johannesburg	$35.9 billion	
Sasol	1950	Chemicals	$14.8 billion	Sandton	$21 billion	
Shoprite Holdings	1979	Food Retail	$11 billion	Brackenfell	$7 billion	
MTN Group	1994	Telecommunications	$10 billion	Randburg	$13.5 billion	
Absa Group Limited	1991	Banking	$9.7 billion	Johannesburg	$9.9 billion	
Standard Bank Group	1862	Banking	$9.6 billion	Johannesburg	$22.9 billion	
Bidvest	1988	Investment Services	$9.4 billion	Sandton	$7.2 billion	
Sanlam	1918	Life & Health Insurance	$8.9 billion	Bellville	$12.4 billion	
Old Mutual	1845	Insurance	$8.2 billion	Sandton	$8.3 billion	
Nedbank	1888	Banking	$7.7 billion	Sandton	$9.4 billion	
FirstRand	1838	Banking	$7.6 billion	Sandton	$27.2 billion	
Naspers	1915	Broadcasting	$6.9 billion	Cape Town	$111.3 billion	
Vodacom	1994	Telecommunications	$6.5 billion	Midrand	$9.6 billion	
Mondi	1967	Paper & Paper Products	$8.8 billion	Johannesburg	$10.9 billion	
MMI Holdings Limited	1898	Life & Health Insurance	$6.1 billion	Centurion	$1.8 billion	
Investec	1974	Investment Services	$6 billion	Sandton	$6.3 billion	
Telkom	1910	Telecommunications	$3 billion	Centurion	$3.8 billion	
Remgro	1948	Conglomerates	$2 billion	Stellenbosch	$10.1 billion	

== Notable firms ==
This list includes notable companies with primary headquarters located in the country. The industry and sector follow the Industry Classification Benchmark taxonomy. Organizations which have ceased operations are included and noted as defunct.

Notable companies Status: P=Private, S=State; A=Active, D=Defunct
Name	Industry	Sector	Headquarters	Founded	Notes	Status	
Adcock Ingram	Health care	Pharmaceuticals	Midrand	1891	Healthcare products	P	A
Afrihost	Telecommunications	Fixed line telecommunications	Sandton	2000	ISP	P	A
Airports Company South Africa (ACSA)	Industrials	Transportation services	Bedfordview	1993	Airport management	P	A
Anglo American	Basic materials	General mining	Johannesburg	1917	Mining	P	A
Anglo American Platinum	Basic materials	General mining	Johannesburg	1995	Mining, part of Anglo American	P	A
Aspen Pharmacare	Health care	Pharmaceuticals	uMhlanga	1850	Drug company	P	A
Automobile Association of South Africa	Consumer services	Specialized consumer services	Midrand	1930	Automotive services	P	A
ABSA Group	Financials	Banks	Johannesburg	1991	Banking and investments	P	A
Beekman Group	Real estate	Real Estate Investment and Services	Port Shepstone	1970	Property developer	P	A
Business Connexion Group	Technology	Software	Centurion	1979	Information Technology (IT)	P	A
Capitec Bank	Financials	Banks	Stellenbosch	2001	Bank	P	A
Cell C	Telecommunications	Mobile telecommunications	Randburg	2001	Mobile network	P	A
Checkers	Consumer services	Food retailers & wholesalers	Brackenfell	1956	Supermarkets, part of Shoprite since 1991	P	A
Cognician	Consumer services	Education Services	Cape Town	2010	e-learning platform	P	A
De Beers	Basic materials	General mining	Johannesburg	1995	Mining	P	A
Defy Appliances	Manufacturing & services	Appliances	Durban	1905		P	A
De Haan's Bus & Coach	Industrials	Commercial vehicles & trucks	Cape Town	1951	Bus manufacturer	P	A
Dimension Data	Technology	Software	Sandton	1983	Software and services	P	A
e.tv	Consumer services	Broadcasting & entertainment	Cape Town	1998	Television	P	A
Eskom	Utilities	Conventional electricity	Sandton	1923	Electrical producer and distribution	S	A
Exxaro	Basic materials	Coal	Centurion	2006	Coal mining	P	A
Food Lover's Market	Consumer services	Food retailers & wholesalers	Brackenfell	1993	Food Retailer	P	A
First National Bank	Financials	Banks	Johannesburg	1838	Bank, part of First Rand	P	A
First Rand	Financials	Banks	Johannesburg	1998	Bank	P	A
FNB Connect	Telecommunications	Fixed line telecommunications	Johannesburg	2009	ISP, part of First National Bank	P	A
Gallo Record Company	Consumer services	Broadcasting & entertainment	Johannesburg	1926	Record label, part of Times Media Group	P	A
Gijima Group	Technology	Telecommunications equipment	Centurion	1998	Communications technology	P	A
Gold Fields	Basic materials	Gold mining	Sandton	1998	Gold mining	P	A
Golden Arrow Bus Services	Consumer services	Travel & tourism	Cape Town	1863	Public transportation	P	A
gTool	Manufacturing	Production Technology Equipment	Pretoria	2013	Mobile repair tools	P	A
H Pistorius & Co	Basic materials	Lime mining	Pretoria	1944	Agricultural lime	P	A
Harmony Gold	Basic materials	Gold mining	Johannesburg	1950	Gold mining	P	A
Hollard Group	Financials	Full line insurance	Johannesburg	1980	Private insurance	P	A
Illovo Sugar	Consumer goods	Food products	uMhlanga	1891	Sugar	P	A
Impala Platinum	Basic materials	General mining	Johannesburg	1973	Mining and refining	P	A
Kumba Iron Ore	Basic materials	Iron & steel	Centurion	2001	Iron mining	P	A
Investec	Financials	Banks	Sandton	1974	Banking and investments	P	A
Jonsson Workwear	Consumer goods	Clothing & accessories	Durban	1968	Workwear, footwear and PPE	P	A
LIFE Healthcare Group	Health care	Health care providers	Randburg	1983	Hospitals	P	A
Mathews & Associates Architects	Industrials	Business support services	Pretoria	2000	Architecture	P	A
Mediclinic International	Health care	Health care providers	Stellenbosch	1983	Hospitals	P	A
M-Net	Consumer services	Broadcasting & entertainment	Randburg	1986	Television	P	A
Mr. Price Group Ltd.	Retail	Clothing, home and sport goods	Durban	1985		P	A
MTN Group	Telecommunications	Fixed line telecommunications	Johannesburg	1994	Multinational telecom	P	A
MultiChoice	Consumer services	Broadcasting & entertainment	Randburg	1996	Entertainment and broadcasting	P	A
MWEB	Telecommunications	Fixed line telecommunications	Cape Town	1997	ISP	P	A
Naspers	Consumer services	Broadcasting & entertainment	Cape Town	1915	Media group	P	A
Nedbank	Financials	Banks	Sandton	1888	Bank	P	A
Neotel	Telecommunications	Fixed line telecommunications	Midrand	2006	ISP	P	A
Netcare	Health care	Health care providers	Sandton	1996	Hospitals, part of General Healthcare Group (UK)	P	A
Nu Metro Cinemas	Consumer services	Recreational services	Randburg	1932	Cinemas	P	A
Old Mutual	Financials	Asset managers	Johannesburg	1845	Asset management and insurance	P	A
Passenger Rail Agency of South Africa	Industrials	Railroads	Johannesburg	1990	Railroads	S	A
PetroSA	Oil & gas	Exploration & production	Cape Town	1965	State-owned oil	S	A
Pick 'n Pay	Consumer services	Food retailers & wholesalers	Cape Town	1967	Supermarket chain	P	A
Pioneer Foods	Consumer goods	Food products	Bellville	1997	Packaged goods	P	A
PPC Ltd.	Industrials	Building materials & fixtures	Pretoria	1892	Cement	P	A
Premier FMCG	Consumer goods	Food products	Midrand	1820	Packaged foods	P	A
Primedia	Consumer services	Broadcasting & entertainment	Sandton	1994	Media holding group	P	A
Primedia Broadcasting	Consumer services	Broadcasting & entertainment	Sandton	1994	Radio, news, part of Primedia	P	A
PUTCO	Consumer services	Travel & tourism	Sandton	1945	Public transportation	P	A
RCL Foods	Consumer goods	Food products	Westville	1960	Primarily packaged foods	P	A
Retief, de Ville & Co.	Industrials	Commercial vehicles and trucks	Paarl	ca. 1880	Coaches	P	A
Rovos Rail	Industrials	Railroads	Pretoria	1989	Rail	P	A
South African Broadcasting Corporation	Consumer services	Broadcasting & entertainment	Johannesburg	1936	State broadcasting	S	A
South African Airways	Consumer services	Airlines	Kempton Park	1934	Airline	S	A
Sanlam	Financials	Asset managers	Bellville	1918	Asset management and insurance	P	A
Sappi	Basic materials	Paper	Johannesburg	1936	Paper	P	A
Sasol	Oil & gas	Exploration & production	Sandton	1950	Refining	P	A
Shoprite	Consumer services	Food retailers & wholesalers	Brackenfell	1979	Food retailer	P	A
South African Breweries	Consumer goods	Brewers	Sandton	1895	Brewery, part of Anheuser-Busch InBev (Belgium)	P	A
South African Post Office	Industrials	Delivery services	Pretoria	1991	Postal services	S	A
Standard Bank	Financials	Banks	Johannesburg	1862	Banks	P	A
StarSat, South Africa	Consumer services	Broadcasting & entertainment	Midrand	2010	Part of StarTimes (China)	P	A
Ster-Kinekor	Consumer services	Recreational services	Sandton	1969	Cinemas	P	A
Telkom	Telecommunications	Fixed line telecommunications	Centurion	1991	Telecom	P	A
Telkom Mobile	Telecommunications	Mobile telecommunications	Centurion	2010	Mobile GSM, part of Telkom	P	A
Tiger Brands	Consumer goods	Food products	Sandton	1921	Primarily packaged foods	P	A
Times Media Group	Consumer services	Publishing	Johannesburg	2012	Publisher	P	A
Tongaat Hulett	Consumer goods	Food products	oThongathi	1892	Sugar	P	A
Transnet National Ports Authority	Industrials	Transportation services	Johannesburg	2005	Ports	S	A
Transnet	Industrials	Transportation services	Johannesburg	1990	Ports and rail	S	A
Travelstart	Consumer services	Travel & tourism	Cape Town	1999	Travel booking	P	A
Union Carriage & Wagon	Industrials	Commercial vehicles & trucks	Nigel	1957	Rolling stock manufacturer	P	A
Vodacom	Telecommunications	Mobile telecommunications	Midrand	1994	Mobile network, part of Vodafone (UK)	P	A
Wesizwe Platinum	Basic materials	General mining	Johannesburg	2003	Mining	P	A
Woolworths	Consumer services	Broadline retailers	Cape Town	1931	Retail stores	P	A

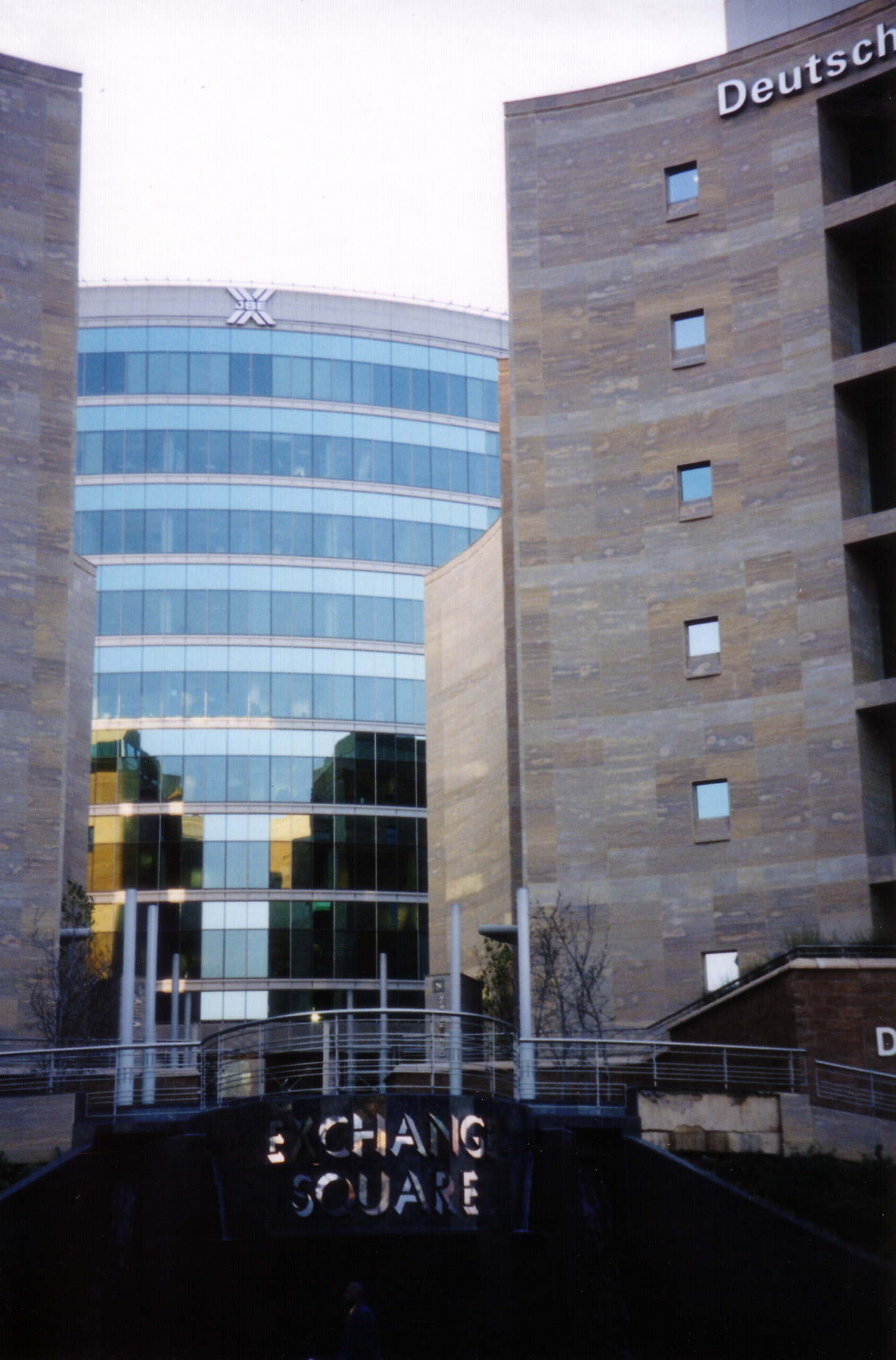
The JSE.

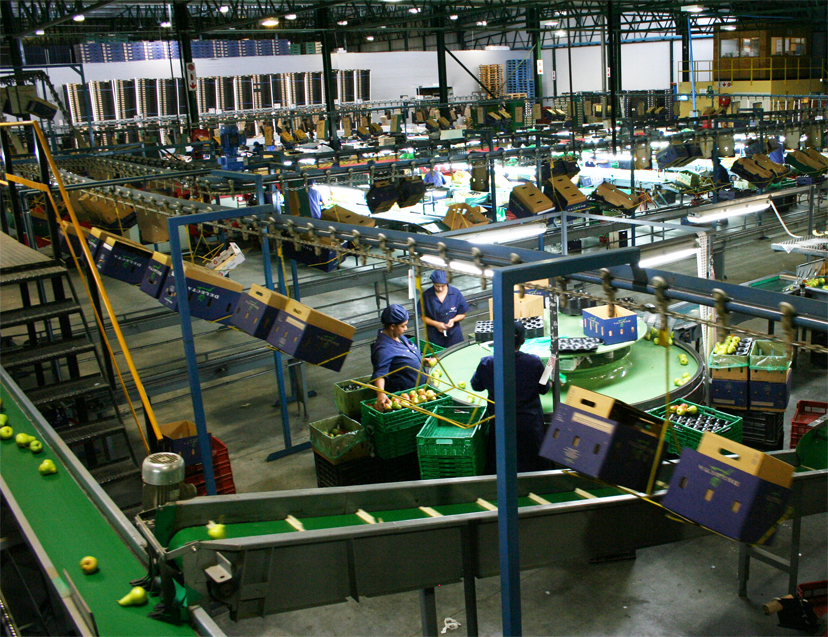
Pear exports in the Ceres valley.

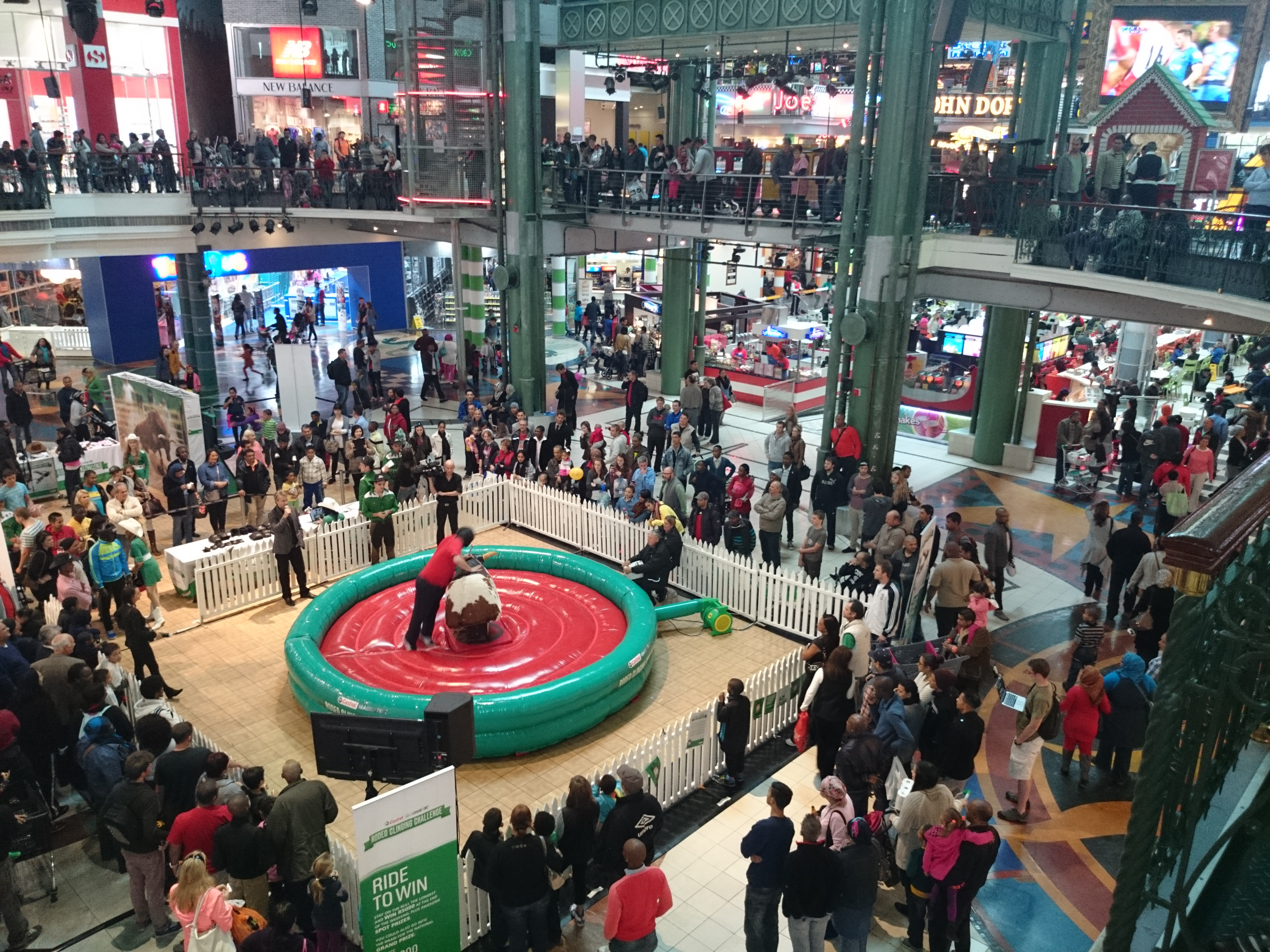
Canal Walk shopping centre in Cape Town.

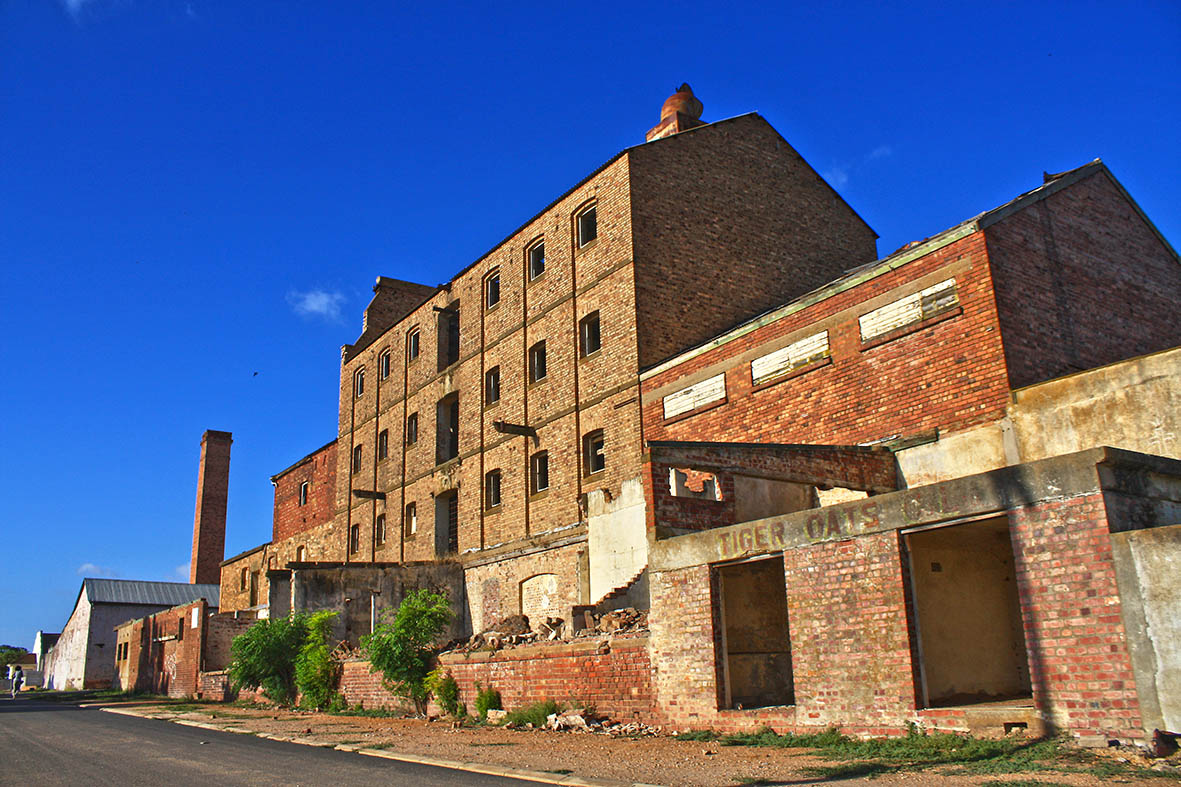
The Tiger Oats building in Moorreesburg, previously home to Tiger Brands.

== See also ==
- List of largest companies in South Africa
- List of airlines of South Africa
- List of banks in South Africa
- State-owned enterprises of South Africa
