= Rain (telecommunications) =

South African telecommunications company

rain (Pty) Ltd
- Type: Private
- ISIN: MU0553S00000
- Industry: Telecommunications
- Founded: 2016; 10 years ago
- Founders: Brandon Leigh, Phumlani Moholi, Conrad Leigh, Gustav Schoeman, Regardt van de Vyver, Tyla Melvill
- Headquarters: Cape Town
- Area served: South Africa
- Key people: Conrad Leigh (CEO, since July 2025); Brandon Leigh (Founder, board/strategic role)
- Products: Internet services: 5G and 4G; Unlimited 5G home WiFi; rainOne: unlimited; Unlimited loop: all-in-one gadget for WiFi, music, and more; Unlimited mobile with LoopPhone
- Website: www.rain.co.za

Rain is a South African technology company and licensed Mobile Network Operator (MNO), operating a national 4G & 5G mobile network together with one of South Africa's largest 5G home networks. Founded in 2016, rain was South Africa's first data-only network and was the first operator in Africa to offer commercial standalone 5G.

== History ==
rain (Pty) Ltd was founded in 2016 and by 2017, South Africa’s first network that was designed for data was launched.

5G Launch

In February 2019, rain launched what it and Forbes described as Africa's first commercial 5G network.

Standalone 5G

In June 2020, rain announced plans to add Standalone 5G towers, and in July 2020 launched its Standalone 5G (5G SA) network — built on a dedicated 5G core rather than a 4G-anchored network — in partnership with Huawei, described as the first such commercial deployment in Africa.

Advertising Ruling

In August 2020, the advertising appeal committee of the Advertising Regulatory Bureau banned rain from claiming unlimited 5G 24/7 after receiving multiple complaints from the public.

Telcom ICASA dispute

In October 2021, Telkom asked ICASA to investigate spectrum-sharing arrangements between Vodacom and rain, arguing the deal entrenched Vodacom's market position; the matter proceeded through regulatory review.

Spectrum Auction

Following South Africa's 2022 high-demand spectrum auction, rain acquired additional 700 MHz and 2600 MHz spectrum, adding to its existing 1800 MHz and 3600 MHz holdings to expand indoor coverage and capacity.

National 4G / rainOne

In May 2023, rain launched a national 4G mobile network and the rainOne plan, combining unlimited 5G home wifi with mobile voice, sms and data — becoming the fourth full mobile network operator in South Africa.

Leadership change

In July 2025, Conrad Leigh, previously rain's COO and CTO, succeeded Brandon Leigh as CEO; Brandon Leigh moved into a strategic board role

loop Launch

In July 2025, rain launched loop, a portable 5G router with an integrated touchscreen, stereo speakers and Android-based software, paired with location-based “Loopzones” data pricing.

LoopPhone

In 2026, rain launched unlimited mobile only on LoopPhone. Customers can choose unlimited data across their City, Province or Countrywide, while every plan includes unlimited local calls and SMS nationwide, on a month-to-month plan.

== Technology ==
rain provides 4G and LTE services through a partnership that enables the company to use infrastructure owned by Vodacom. They launched the first Standalone 5G (3600) network in the country, powered by Huawei infrastructure.

rain's Standalone 5G is widely available across South Africa.

rain is a licensed South African Mobile Network Operator (MNO), operating a national 4G & 5G mobile network together with one of South Africa’s largest 5G home networks.

The rain network is built on thousands of sites using nationally licensed spectrum across the 700 MHz, 1800 MHz, 2600 MHz and 3600 MHz bands. This combination provides broad geographic coverage, improved indoor performance and the capacity required for high-performance mobile and home broadband services.

== Reception ==
rain topped PwC and DataEQ's South African Telecommunications Sentiment Index (social-media-based sentiment analysis across MTN, Vodacom, Telkom, rain and Cell C) in 2024, 2025 and 2026, recording the highest net sentiment score among the five operators evaluated.

== Controversies ==
=== Ban claiming “Unlimited Data 24/7 on 5G” ===
In August 2020, the advertising appeal committee of the advertising regulatory bureau banned rain from claiming unlimited 5G 24/7 after receiving multiple complaints from the public.

=== Spectrum arrangements ===
In October 2021, Telkom has approached Independent Communications Authority of South Africa (ICASA) to report spectrum arrangements between competitors Vodacom and rain. Telkom argues Vodacom's ability to control rain's spectrum entrenches its position as a dominant player in a highly concentrated market. An investigation is still underway.

== Ownership ==
rain Shareholders
Company	Shareholding	Notable Directors	Value
Quarme Private Equity Investments	41.36%	Paul Harris Nicola Harris	R6.22 billion
UBI General Partner	19.93%	Patrice Motsepe Johan van Zyl Johan van der Merwe	R3.00 billion
Pluvial	11.75%	Willem Roos Roger Grobler Ravi Naidoo	R1.77 billion
Montegray Capital	11.53%	Michael Jordaan	R1.73 billion
Ata Fund 1	6.42%	Nicola Harris Kgotlello Sere	R0.96 billion
Arakot	3.41%	Catherina Heunis	R0.51 billion
Institute X Idea Incubators	2.30%	Phumlani Moholi Brandon Leigh	R0.35 billion
Employee Trust	1.70%	—	R0.26 billion
Management	1.32%	—	R0.20 billion
Pralene	0.28%	Grant Gelink	R0.04 billion

== See also ==
- Telephone numbers in Africa
- Telephone numbers in South Africa
- MTN (South Africa)
- Cell C
- Telkom Mobile
- Internet in South Africa
