= June 11 =

June 11 this year in various calendars
- Thursday, 11 June 2026
Akan	Nwonayaw
Armenian	26 Margach 1475
Aztec	Teotleco 12, 10 Xōchitl
Babylonian	24 Ayaru, 2337 SE
Balinese pawukon	Menga, Beteng, Menala, Wage, Aryang, Wraspati of Sungsang, Yama, Jangur, Suka
Bengali	28 Joishtho, BS 1433
Chinese	Yang Fire Dragon・Legs Mansion; Fire Horse Year, Month 4, Day 26 (Mangzhong, 10 days until Xiazhi)
Common Era	11 June 2026 CE
Coptic	4 Paoni, AM 1742
Egyptian	26 Phaophi, 2775 NE
Ethiopian	4 Sanē, 2018 Amätä Məhrät
French Republican	Décade III, Tridi de Prairial de l'Année 234 de la République
Gregorian	11 June, AD 2026
Hebrew	26 Sivan, AM 5786
Hindu	Aśvinī・Śobhana; Solar: 28 Jyeṣṭha, 1948 SE; Lunisolar: Ekādaśī, Kṛishna pakṣa of Adhika Jyeṣṭha, 2083 VE; Rāudra・5127 KY・1,872,737
Icelandic	Fimmtudagur, 20 Skerpla 2026
Islamic	25 Dhu al-Hijjah, AH 1447 (using tabular method)
ISO week date	2026-W24-4
Japanese	26 Uzuki, Reiwa 8 (Bōshu, 10 days until Geshi)
Julian	29 May, AD 2026 (AM 7534)
Julian day	2461203
Korean	26 Baemdal, 4359 DE
Maya	13.0.13.12.0; 13 Zotz, 10 Ahau
Roman	ante diem IV Kalendas Iunias, MMDCCLXXIX AUC
Solar Hijri	21 Khordad, SH 1405
Tibetan	26 sa ga, me pho rta 2153 or 1772 or 1000

<<	June					>>
Su	Mo	Tu	We	Th	Fr	Sa
	1	2	3	4	5	6
7	8	9	10	11	12	13
14	15	16	17	18	19	20
21	22	23	24	25	26	27
28	29	30
2026

June 11 in recent years
2026 (Thursday)
2025 (Wednesday)
2024 (Tuesday)
2023 (Sunday)
2022 (Saturday)
2021 (Friday)
2020 (Thursday)
2019 (Tuesday)
2018 (Monday)
2017 (Sunday)

June 11 is the 162nd day of the year (163rd in leap years) in the Gregorian calendar; 203 days remain until the end of the year.

== Events ==
=== Pre-1600 ===
- 173 – Marcomannic Wars: The Roman army in Moravia is encircled by the Quadi, who have broken the peace treaty (171). In a violent thunderstorm, emperor Marcus Aurelius defeats and subdues them in the so-called "miracle of the rain".
- 631 – Emperor Taizong of Tang sends envoys to the Xueyantuo bearing gold and silk in order to seek the release of Chinese prisoners captured during the transition from Sui to Tang.
- 786 – A Hasanid Alid uprising in Mecca is crushed by the Abbasids at the Battle of Fakhkh.
- 980 – Vladimir the Great consolidates the Kievan realm from Ukraine to the Baltic Sea. He is proclaimed ruler (knyaz) of all Kievan Rus'.
- 1011 – Lombard Revolt: Greek citizens of Bari rise up against the Lombard rebels led by Melus and deliver the city to Basil Mesardonites, Byzantine governor (catepan) of the Catepanate of Italy.
- 1042 – Empress Zoe Porphyrogenita marries Constantine Monomachos, who is crowned the following day as Byzantine Emperor.
- 1118 – Roger of Salerno, Prince of Antioch, captures Azaz from the Seljuk Turks.
- 1157 – Albert I of Brandenburg, also called The Bear (Ger: Albrecht der Bär), becomes the founder of the Margraviate of Brandenburg, Germany and the first margrave.
- 1345 – The megas doux Alexios Apokaukos, chief minister of the Byzantine Empire, is lynched by political prisoners.
- 1429 – Hundred Years' War: Start of the Battle of Jargeau.
- 1482 – The Treaty of Fotheringhay is signed between the English and Alexander Stewart, Duke of Albany, the rebellious brother of king James III of Scotland.
- 1488 – The Battle of Sauchieburn is fought between rebel Lords and James III of Scotland, resulting in the death of the king.
- 1509 – Henry VIII of England marries Catherine of Aragon.
- 1559 – Don Tristan de Luna y Arellano sails for Florida with a party of 1,500, intending to settle on the gulf coast (Vera Cruz, Mexico).
- 1594 – Philip II recognizes the rights and privileges of the local nobles and chieftains in the Philippines, which paved way to the stabilization of the rule of the Principalía (an elite ruling class of native nobility in Spanish Philippines).

=== 1601–1900 ===
- 1685 – James Scott, Duke of Monmouth, lands at Lyme in Dorset with loyal followers with the intent to depose king James II of England.
- 1702 – Anglo-Dutch forces skirmish with French forces before the walls of Nijmegen and prevent its fall.
- 1724 – Johann Sebastian Bach leads his cantata O Ewigkeit, du Donnerwort (O eternity, you word of thunder), BWV 20, on the first Sunday after Trinity, beginning his second cycle, the chorale cantata cycle.
- 1748 – Denmark adopts the characteristic Nordic Cross flag later taken up by all other Scandinavian countries.
- 1770 – British explorer Captain James Cook runs aground on the Great Barrier Reef.
- 1775 – The Coronation of Louis XVI in Reims, the last coronation before the French Revolution.
- 1775 – The American Revolutionary War's first naval engagement, the Battle of Machias, results in the capture of a small British naval vessel.
- 1776 – American Revolution: The Second Continental Congress appoints Thomas Jefferson, John Adams, Benjamin Franklin, Roger Sherman, and Robert R. Livingston to the Committee of Five to draft a declaration of independence.
- 1788 – Russian explorer Gerasim Izmailov reaches Alaska.
- 1805 – A fire consumes large portions of Detroit in the Michigan Territory.
- 1825 – The first cornerstone is laid for Fort Hamilton in New York City.
- 1837 – The Broad Street Riot occurs in Boston, fueled by ethnic tensions between Yankees and Irish.
- 1865 – The Naval Battle of the Riachuelo is fought on the rivulet Riachuelo (Argentina), between the Paraguayan Navy on one side and the Brazilian Navy on the other. The Brazilian victory was crucial for the later success of the Triple Alliance (Brazil, Uruguay, and Argentina) in the Paraguayan War.
- 1882 – Nationalist riots break out in Alexandria directed against foreign domination. More than 50 Europeans are killed, including the British consul.
- 1892 – The Limelight Department, one of the world's first film studios, is officially established in Melbourne, Australia.
- 1895 – Paris–Bordeaux–Paris, sometimes called the first automobile race in history or the "first motor race", takes place.
- 1898 – The Hundred Days' Reform, a planned movement to reform social, political, and educational institutions in China, is started by the Guangxu Emperor, but is suspended by Empress Dowager Cixi after 104 days. (The failed reform led to the abolition of the Imperial examination in 1905.)

=== 1901–present ===
- 1901 – The boundaries of the Colony of New Zealand are extended by the UK to include the Cook Islands.
- 1903 – A group of Serbian officers storms the royal palace and assassinates King Alexander I of Serbia and his wife, Queen Draga.
- 1917 – King Alexander assumes the throne of Greece after his father, Constantine I, is deemed to have abdicated under pressure from allied armies occupying Athens.
- 1919 – Sir Barton wins the Belmont Stakes, becoming the first horse to win the U.S. Triple Crown.
- 1920 – During the U.S. Republican National Convention in Chicago, U.S. Republican Party leaders gather in a room at the Blackstone Hotel to come to a consensus on their candidate for the U.S. presidential election, leading the Associated Press to coin the political phrase "smoke-filled room".
- 1936 – Inventor Edwin Armstrong demonstrates FM broadcasting to an audience of engineers at the FCC in Washington, DC.
- 1936 – The London International Surrealist Exhibition opens.
- 1937 – Great Purge: The Soviet Union under Joseph Stalin executes eight army leaders.
- 1938 – Second Sino-Japanese War: The Battle of Wuhan starts.
- 1940 – World War II: The Siege of Malta begins with a series of Italian air raids.
- 1942 – World War II: The United States agrees to send Lend-Lease aid to the Soviet Union.
- 1942 – Free French Forces retreat from Bir Hakeim after having successfully delayed the Axis advance.
- 1944 – USS Missouri, the last battleship built by the United States Navy and future site of the signing of the Japanese Instrument of Surrender, is commissioned.
- 1955 – Eighty-three spectators are killed and at least one hundred are injured after an Austin-Healey and a Mercedes-Benz collide at the 24 Hours of Le Mans, the deadliest ever accident in motorsports.
- 1956 – Start of Gal Oya riots, the first reported ethnic riots that target minority Sri Lankan Tamils in the Eastern Province. The total number of deaths is reportedly 150.
- 1962 – Frank Morris, John Anglin and Clarence Anglin allegedly become the only prisoners to escape from the prison on Alcatraz Island.
- 1963 – American Civil Rights Movement: Governor of Alabama George Wallace defiantly stands at the door of Foster Auditorium at the University of Alabama in an attempt to block two black students, Vivian Malone and James Hood, from attending that school. Later in the day, accompanied by federalized National Guard troops, they are able to register.
- 1963 – Buddhist monk Thích Quảng Đức burns himself with gasoline in a busy Saigon intersection to protest the lack of religious freedom in South Vietnam.
- 1963 – John F. Kennedy addresses Americans from the Oval Office proposing the Civil Rights Act of 1964, which would revolutionize American society by guaranteeing equal access to public facilities, ending segregation in education, and guaranteeing federal protection for voting rights.
- 1964 – World War II veteran Walter Seifert attacks an elementary school in Cologne, Germany, killing at least eight children and two teachers, and seriously injuring several more, with a home-made flamethrower and a lance.
- 1968 – Lloyd J. Old identifies the first cell surface antigens that could differentiate among different cell types.
- 1970 – After being appointed on May 15, Anna Mae Hays and Elizabeth P. Hoisington officially receive their ranks as U.S. Army general officers, becoming the first women to do so.
- 1971 – The U.S. Government forcibly removes the last holdouts to the Native American Occupation of Alcatraz, ending 19 months of control.
- 1978 – Altaf Hussain founds the student political movement All Pakistan Muhajir Students Organisation (APMSO) in Karachi University.
- 1981 – A magnitude 6.9 earthquake at Golbaf, Iran, kills at least 2,000.
- 1987 – Diane Abbott, Paul Boateng and Bernie Grant are elected as the first black MPs in Great Britain.
- 1998 – Compaq Computer pays US$9 billion for Digital Equipment Corporation in the largest high-tech acquisition.
- 2001 – Timothy McVeigh is executed for his role in the Oklahoma City bombing.
- 2002 – Antonio Meucci is acknowledged as the first inventor of the telephone by the United States Congress.
- 2004 – Cassini–Huygens makes its closest flyby of the Saturn moon Phoebe.
- 2007 – Mudslides in Chittagong, Bangladesh, kill 130 people.
- 2008 – Canadian Prime Minister Stephen Harper makes a historic official apology to Canada's First Nations in regard to abuses at a Canadian Indian residential school.
- 2008 – The Fermi Gamma-ray Space Telescope is launched into orbit.
- 2010 – The first FIFA World Cup held on African soil kicks off in South Africa.
- 2012 – Seventy-five people die in a landslide triggered by two earthquakes in Afghanistan; an entire village is buried.
- 2013 – Greece's public broadcaster ERT is shut down by then-prime minister Antonis Samaras. It would be opened exactly two years later by then-prime minister Alexis Tsipras.

== Births ==
=== Pre-1600 ===
- 1403 – John IV, Duke of Brabant (died 1427)
- 1456 – Anne Neville, Princess of Wales and Queen Consort of England (died 1485)
- 1540 – Barnabe Googe, English poet and translator (died 1594)
- 1555 – Lodovico Zacconi, Italian composer and theorist (died 1627)
- 1572 – Ben Jonson, English poet, playwright, and critic (died 1637)
- 1585 – Evert Horn, Swedish soldier (died 1615)
- 1588 – George Wither, English poet (died 1667)

=== 1601–1900 ===
- 1620 – John Moore, English businessman and politician, Lord Mayor of London (died 1702)
- 1655 – Antonio Cifrondi, Italian painter (died 1730)
- 1662 – Tokugawa Ienobu, Japanese shōgun (died 1712)
- 1672 – Francesco Antonio Bonporti, Italian priest and composer (died 1749)
- 1690 – Giovanni Antonio Giay, Italian composer (died 1764)
- 1696 – James Francis Edward Keith, Scottish-Prussian field marshal (died 1758)
- 1697 – Francesco Antonio Vallotti, Italian organist and composer (died 1780)
- 1704 – Carlos Seixas, Portuguese harpsichord player and composer (died 1742)
- 1709 – Joachim Martin Falbe, German painter (died 1782)
- 1723 – Johann Georg Palitzsch, German astronomer (died 1788)
- 1726 – Infanta Maria Teresa Rafaela of Spain (died 1746)
- 1741 – Joseph Warren, American physician and general (died 1775)
- 1776 – John Constable, English painter and academic (died 1837)
- 1796 – François-Louis Cailler, Swiss chocolatier (died 1852)
- 1797 – José Trinidad Reyes, Honduran philosopher and theorist (died 1855)
- 1815 – Julia Margaret Cameron, Indian-Sri Lankan photographer (died 1879)
- 1818 – Alexander Bain, Scottish philosopher and academic (died 1903)
- 1829 – Edward Braddon, English-Australian politician, 18th Premier of Tasmania (died 1904)
- 1834 – Johann Bauschinger, German mechanical engineer and physicist (died 1893)
- 1842 – Carl von Linde, German engineer and academic (died 1934)
- 1846 – William Louis Marshall, American general and engineer (died 1920)
- 1847 – Millicent Fawcett, English academic and activist (died 1929)
- 1861 – Alexander Peacock, Australian politician, 20th Premier of Victoria (died 1933)
- 1864 – Richard Strauss, German composer and conductor (died 1949)
- 1867 – Charles Fabry, French physicist and academic (died 1945)
- 1871 – Stjepan Radić, Croatian lawyer and politician (died 1928)
- 1876 – Alfred L. Kroeber, American-French anthropologist and ethnologist (died 1960)
- 1877 – Renée Vivien, English-French poet and author (died 1909)
- 1880 – Jeannette Rankin, American social worker and politician (died 1973)
- 1881 – Spiros Xenos, Greek-Swedish painter (died 1963)
- 1881 – Mordecai Kaplan, Lithuanian rabbi, founded Reconstructionist Judaism (died 1983)
- 1881 – Maggie Gripenberg, Finnish dancer and choreographer (died 1976)
- 1888 – Bartolomeo Vanzetti, Italian-American anarchist and convicted criminal (died 1927)
- 1889 – Hugo Wieslander, Swedish decathlete (died 1976)
- 1894 – Kiichiro Toyoda, Japanese businessman, founded Toyota (died 1952)
- 1895 – Nikolai Bulganin, Soviet politician (died 1975)
- 1897 – Ram Prasad Bismil, Indian activist, founded the Hindustan Republican Association (died 1927)
- 1899 – Yasunari Kawabata, Japanese novelist and short story writer Nobel Prize laureate (died 1972)

=== 1901–present ===
- 1901 – Benny Wearing, Australian rugby league player (died 1968)
- 1908 – Karl Hein, German hammer thrower (died 1982)
- 1908 – Francisco Marto, Portuguese saint (died 1919)
- 1909 – Natascha Artin Brunswick, German-American mathematician and photographer (died 2003)
- 1910 – Carmine Coppola, American flute player and composer (died 1991)
- 1910 – Jacques Cousteau, French biologist, author, and inventor, co-developed the aqua-lung (died 1997)
- 1912 – James Algar, American director, producer, and screenwriter (died 1998)
- 1912 – William Baziotes, American painter and academic (died 1963)
- 1912 – Mohammad Hassan Ganji, Iranian meteorologist and academic (died 2012)
- 1913 – Vince Lombardi, American football player, coach, and manager (died 1970)
- 1913 – Risë Stevens, American soprano and actress (died 2013)
- 1914 – Jan Hendrik van den Berg, Dutch psychiatrist and academic (died 2012)
- 1915 – Magda Gabor, Hungarian-American actress (died 1997)
- 1915 – Nicholas Metropolis, American mathematician and physicist (died 1999)
- 1918 – Ruth Aarons, American table tennis player and manager (died 1980)
- 1918 – Hendra Gunawan, Indonesian painter and sculptor (died 1983)
- 1919 – Suleiman Mousa, Jordanian historian and author (died 2008)
- 1919 – Richard Todd, Irish-English actor (died 2009)
- 1920 – Irving Howe, American writer and critic (died 1993)
- 1920 – Shelly Manne, American 'West Coast' jazz and session drummer, percussionist, composer, and bandleader (died 1984)
- 1925 – William Styron, American novelist and essayist (died 2006)
- 1926 – Carlisle Floyd, American composer and educator (died 2021)
- 1927 – Beryl Grey, English ballerina (died 2022)
- 1928 – Queen Fabiola of Belgium (died 2014)
- 1930 – Charles Rangel, American soldier, lawyer, and politician (died 2025)
- 1932 – Athol Fugard, South African-American actor, director, and playwright (died 2025)
- 1933 – Gene Wilder, American actor, director, and screenwriter (died 2016)
- 1937 – Robin Warren, Australian pathologist and academic, Nobel Prize laureate (died 2024)
- 1939 – Rachael Heyhoe Flint, Baroness Heyhoe Flint, English cricketer and journalist (died 2017)
- 1939 – Jackie Stewart, Scottish racing driver and sports presenter
- 1941 – Tony Whitford, Canadian politician (died 2024)
- 1942 – Parris Glendening, American politician, 59th Governor of Maryland
- 1943 – Ray Warren, Australian sportscaster
- 1945 – Adrienne Barbeau, American actress
- 1948 – Lalu Prasad Yadav, Indian politician, 20th Chief Minister of Bihar
- 1949 – Frank Beard, American drummer and songwriter (died 2026)
- 1952 – Yekaterina Podkopayeva, Russian runner
- 1952 – Donnie Van Zant, American singer-songwriter and guitarist
- 1954 – John Dyson, Australian cricketer
- 1955 – Yuriy Sedykh, Ukrainian hammer thrower (died 2021)
- 1956 – Joe Montana, American football player and sportscaster
- 1959 – Hugh Laurie, English actor and screenwriter
- 1960 – Mehmet Oz, American surgeon, author, and television host
- 1962 – Mano Menezes, Brazilian footballer and coach
- 1963 – Britta Phillips, American singer-songwriter, musician, and actress
- 1963 – Sandra Schmirler, Canadian curler and sportscaster (died 2000)
- 1964 – Jean Alesi, French racing driver
- 1964 – Penny Ford, American singer
- 1965 – Georgios Bartzokas, Greek former professional basketball player
- 1967 – Graeme Bachop, New Zealand rugby player
- 1967 – João Garcia, Portuguese mountaineer
- 1968 – Alois, Hereditary Prince of Liechtenstein
- 1968 – Manoa Thompson, Fijian rugby player
- 1969 – Peter Dinklage, American actor and producer
- 1969 – Olaf Kapagiannidis, German footballer
- 1971 – Vladimir Gaidamașciuc, Moldovan footballer
- 1971 – Mark Richardson, New Zealand cricketer
- 1973 – José Manuel Abundis, Mexican footballer and coach
- 1974 – Fragiskos Alvertis, Greek basketball player, coach, and manager
- 1976 – Reiko Tosa, Japanese runner
- 1977 – Ryan Dunn, American stunt performer (died 2011)
- 1977 – Geoff Ogilvy, Australian golfer
- 1978 – Joshua Jackson, Canadian-American actor
- 1978 – Daryl Tuffey, New Zealand cricketer
- 1979 – Ali Boussaboun, Moroccan-Dutch footballer
- 1981 – Emiliano Moretti, Italian footballer
- 1981 – Kristo Tohver, Estonian footballer and referee
- 1982 – Vanessa Boslak, French pole vaulter
- 1982 – Jacques Freitag, South African high jumper (died 2024)
- 1982 – Eldar Rønning, Norwegian skier
- 1982 – Diana Taurasi, American basketball player
- 1983 – Chuck Hayes, American basketball player
- 1983 – José Reyes, Dominican baseball player
- 1983 – Anna Maria Żukowska (born 1983), Polish politician and jurist
- 1984 – Andy Lee, Irish boxer
- 1984 – Vágner Love, Brazilian footballer
- 1985 – Brad Jacobs, Canadian curler
- 1986 – Sebastian Bayer, German long jumper
- 1986 – Shia LaBeouf, American actor
- 1987 – Gonzalo Castro, German footballer
- 1988 – Jesús Fernández Collado, Spanish footballer
- 1988 – Claire Holt, Australian actress
- 1988 – Yui Aragaki, Japanese actress, voice actress, singer-songwriter, model, radio host
- 1989 – Maya Moore, American basketball player
- 1990 – Christophe Lemaitre, French sprinter
- 1991 – Daniel Howell, English Youtuber
- 1991 – Kyle Troup, American bowler
- 1992 – Davide Zappacosta, Italian footballer
- 1994 – Ivana Baquero, Spanish actress
- 1996 – Philip Billing, Danish footballer
- 1997 – Kodak Black, American rapper
- 1997 – Unai Simón, Spanish footballer
- 1997 – Jorja Smith, English singer
- 1999 – Eartha Cumings, Scottish footballer
- 1999 – Kai Havertz, German footballer
- 2001 – Billy Gilmour, Scottish footballer
- 2004 – Katrina Scott, American tennis player

== Deaths ==
=== Pre-1600 ===
- 573 – Emilian of Cogolla, Iberic saint (born 472)
- 786 – Al-Husayn ibn Ali al-Abid, anti-Abbasid rebel leader
- 840 – Junna, emperor of Japan (born 785)
- 884 – Shi Jingsi, general of the Tang Dynasty
- 888 – Rimbert, archbishop of Bremen (born 830)
- 1183 – Henry the Young King of England (born 1155)
- 1216 – Henry of Flanders, emperor of the Latin Empire (born c. 1174)
- 1248 – Adachi Kagemori, Japanese samurai
- 1253 – Amadeus IV, count of Savoy (born 1197)
- 1298 – Yolanda of Poland (born 1235)
- 1323 – Berengar Fredol the Elder, French lawyer and bishop (born 1250)
- 1345 – Alexios Apokaukos, chief minister of the Byzantine Empire
- 1347 – Bartholomew of San Concordio, Italian Dominican canonist and man of letters (born 1260)
- 1446 – Henry de Beauchamp, 1st Duke of Warwick (born 1425)
- 1479 – John of Sahagun, hermit and saint (born 1419)
- 1488 – James III of Scotland (born 1451)
- 1557 – John III of Portugal (born 1502)
- 1560 – Mary of Guise, queen of James V of Scotland (born 1515)

=== 1601–1900 ===
- 1683 – Nikita Pustosvyat, a leader of the Russian Old Believers, beheaded (born unknown)
- 1695 – André Félibien, French historian and author (born 1619)
- 1712 – Louis Joseph, Duke of Vendôme (born 1654)
- 1727 – George I of Great Britain (born 1660)
- 1748 – Felice Torelli, Italian painter (born 1667)
- 1796 – Samuel Whitbread, English brewer and politician, founded the Whitbread Company (born 1720)
- 1847 – John Franklin, English admiral and politician (born 1786)
- 1852 – Karl Bryullov, Russian painter (born 1799)
- 1859 – Klemens von Metternich, German-Austrian politician, 1st State Chancellor of the Austrian Empire (born 1773)
- 1879 – William, Prince of Orange (born 1840)
- 1882 – Louis Désiré Maigret, French bishop (born 1804)
- 1885 – Matías Ramos Mejía, Argentinian colonel (born 1810)
- 1897 – Henry Ayers, English-Australian politician, 8th Premier of South Australia (born 1821)

=== 1901–present ===
- 1903 – Nikolai Bugaev, Russian mathematician and philosopher (born 1837)
- 1903 – Alexander I of Serbia (born 1876)
- 1903 – Draga Mašin, Serbian wife of Alexander I of Serbia (born 1864)
- 1911 – James Curtis Hepburn, American physician and missionary (born 1815)
- 1913 – Mahmud Shevket Pasha, Ottoman general and politician, 279th Grand Vizier of the Ottoman Empire (born 1856)
- 1914 – Adolphus Frederick V, Grand Duke of Mecklenburg-Strelitz (born 1848)
- 1920 – William F. Halsey, Sr., American captain (born 1853)
- 1924 – Théodore Dubois, French organist, composer, and educator (born 1837)
- 1927 – William Attewell, English cricketer (born 1861)
- 1934 – Lev Vygotsky, Belarusian-Russian psychologist and theorist (born 1896)
- 1936 – Robert E. Howard, American author and poet (born 1906)
- 1937 – R. J. Mitchell, English engineer, designed the Supermarine Spitfire (born 1895)
- 1941 – Daniel Carter Beard, American author and illustrator, founded the Boy Scouts of America (born 1850)
- 1955 – Pierre Levegh, French race car driver (born 1905)
- 1962 – Chhabi Biswas, Indian actor and director (born 1900)
- 1963 – Thích Quảng Đức, Vietnamese monk and martyr (born 1897)
- 1965 – Paul B. Coremans, Belgian chemist and academic (born 1908)
- 1965 – José Mendes Cabeçadas, Portuguese admiral and politician, 9th President of Portugal (born 1883)
- 1970 – Frank Laubach, American missionary and mystic (born 1884)
- 1974 – Eurico Gaspar Dutra, Brazilian general and politician, 16th President of Brazil (born 1883)
- 1974 – Julius Evola, Italian philosopher and author (born 1898)
- 1976 – Jim Konstanty, American baseball player (born 1917)
- 1979 – Alice Dalgliesh, Trinidadian-American author and publisher (born 1893)
- 1979 – John Wayne, American actor, director, and producer (born 1907)
- 1982 – H. Radclyffe Roberts, American entomologist (born 1906)
- 1983 – Ghanshyam Das Birla, Indian businessman and politician (born 1894)
- 1984 – Enrico Berlinguer, Italian politician (born 1922)
- 1986 – Chesley Bonestell, American painter and illustrator (born 1888)
- 1991 – Cromwell Everson, South African composer (born 1925)
- 1992 – Rafael Orozco Maestre, Colombian singer (born 1954)
- 1993 – Ray Sharkey, American actor (born 1952)
- 1994 – A. Thurairajah, Sri Lankan engineer and academic (born 1934)
- 1996 – Brigitte Helm, German-Swiss actress (born 1908)
- 1998 – Catherine Cookson, English author (born 1906)
- 1999 – DeForest Kelley, American actor and screenwriter (born 1920)
- 2001 – Timothy McVeigh, American terrorist (born 1968)
- 2001 – Amalia Mendoza, Mexican singer and actress (born 1923)
- 2003 – David Brinkley, American journalist and author (born 1920)
- 2004 – Egon von Fürstenberg, Swiss fashion designer (born 1946)
- 2005 – Vasco Gonçalves, Portuguese general and politician, 103rd Prime Minister of Portugal (born 1922)
- 2005 – Anne-Marie Alonzo, Canadian playwright, poet, novelist, critic and publisher (born 1951)
- 2006 – Neroli Fairhall, New Zealand archer (born 1944)
- 2007 – Mala Powers, American actress (born 1931)
- 2008 – Ove Andersson, Swedish race car driver (born 1938)
- 2008 – Võ Văn Kiệt, Vietnamese soldier and politician, 5th Prime Minister of Vietnam (born 1922)
- 2011 – Eliyahu M. Goldratt, Israeli physicist and engineer (born 1947)
- 2012 – Ann Rutherford, Canadian-American actress (born 1917)
- 2012 – Teófilo Stevenson, Cuban boxer and engineer (born 1952)
- 2013 – Miller Barber, American golfer (born 1931)
- 2013 – Robert Fogel, American economist and academic, Nobel Prize laureate (born 1926)
- 2013 – Kristiāns Pelšs, Latvian ice hockey player (born 1992)
- 2013 – Vidya Charan Shukla, Indian politician, Indian Minister of External Affairs (born 1929)
- 2014 – Ruby Dee, American actress (born 1922)
- 2014 – Rafael Frühbeck de Burgos, Spanish conductor and composer (born 1933)
- 2014 – Susan B. Horwitz, American computer scientist, engineer, and academic (born 1955)
- 2014 – Mipham Chokyi Lodro, Tibetan lama and educator (born 1952)
- 2014 – Benjamin Mophatlane, South African businessman (born 1973)
- 2015 – Ornette Coleman, American saxophonist, violinist, trumpet player, and composer (born 1930)
- 2015 – Ian McKechnie, Scottish footballer and manager (born 1941)
- 2015 – Ron Moody, English actor and singer (born 1924)
- 2015 – Dusty Rhodes, American wrestler (born 1945)
- 2016 – Rudi Altig, German track and road racing cyclist (born 1937)
- 2019 – Billy McKee, Irish republican and founding member of the Provisional Irish Republican Army (born 1921)
- 2020 – Stella Pevsner, children's author (born 1921)
- 2022 – Hilary Devey, English businesswoman, television presenter (born 1957)
- 2024 – Tony Lo Bianco, American actor (born 1936)
- 2024 – Howard Fineman, American journalist (born 1948)
- 2024 – Françoise Hardy, French singer-songwriter and actress (born 1944)
- 2024 – Majed Abu Maraheel, Palestinian long-distance runner and football player (born 1963)
- 2025 – Brian Wilson, American singer and songwriter, co-founder of the Beach Boys (born 1942)
- 2026 – Bajrakitiyabha, Thai royal, daughter of Vajiralongkorn (born 1978)

== Holidays and observances ==
- Brazilian Navy Day (Brazil)
- Christian feast day:
  - Alice of Schaerbeek
  - Barnabas the Apostle
  - Bartholomew the Apostle (Eastern Christianity)
  - Blessed Ignatius Maloyan (Armenian Catholic Church)
  - Blessed Maria Schininà
  - Paula Frassinetti
  - Riagail of Bangor
  - Rosa Francisca Dolors Molas Vallvé
  - Blessed Yolanda of Poland
  - June 11 (Eastern Orthodox liturgics)
- Davis Day (Cape Breton, Nova Scotia, Canada)
- King Kamehameha I Day (Hawaii, United States)
- Student Day (Honduras)
