= Telkom Mobile =

Telkom
- Company type: Private (subsidiary of Telkom)
- Industry: Telecommunications
- Founded: October 2010
- Headquarters: Centurion, South Africa
- Area served: South Africa
- Key people: Attila Vital (MD Telkom Mobile) Amith Maharaj (Snr Managing Executive - Telkom Mobile Operations) Dirk Reyneke (CFO: Telkom Mobile) Pieter Spies (Managing Executive - Telkom Mobile Sales)
- Products: GSM-related products GSM services 3G/Internet services LTE; 5G FWA High Speed Internet as of 27 October 2022
- Parent: Telkom
- Website: www.telkom.co.za

Telkom (formerly known as 8.ta from 2010 till 2013 and as Telkom Mobile From 2013 till 2014), is a South African mobile telecommunications company. Telkom was launched in October 2010 and is owned by Telkom SOC. Telkom phone numbers use the 0811 to 0819 dialling prefixes. Telkom's Main competitors in South African mobile telecommunication industry includes MTN, Vodacom, Cell C and Rain.

== Technology ==
The Telkom network provides voice and data products and services over a unified 2G / 3G network. Telkom has launched LTE on the 2300 MHz frequency band offering speeds of up to 100 Mbit/s. As of 27 October 2022 Telkom has added 5G FWA high speed connections partnering with China's Huawei Technologies.

== Telkom Music ==
Telkom Mobile partnered with Tencent Africa to launch Telkom Music, a music streaming service with the Telkom Music Powered By JOOX app.

== See also ==
- Mobile telephony in Africa
- Telecommunications in South Africa
- Internet in South Africa
