= Telephone numbers in South Africa =

- Location of South Africa (dark green)
- Country: South Africa
- Continent: Africa
- Regulator: Independent Communications Authority of South Africa
- Numbering plan type: Closed
- NSN length: 9
- Format: (AB) xxx-xxxx
- Numbering plan: Numbering Plan Regulations
- Last updated: March 24, 2016
- Country code: 27
- International access: 00
- Long-distance: 0

Telephone numbers in South Africa are administered by the Independent Communications Authority of South Africa(ICASA). On 16 January 2007, the country switched to a closed numbering plan. It became mandatory to dial the full nine-digit national telephone number. For calls within the country, this is prefixed by trunk code 0 (zero), which is often included in listings of the area code. Area codes within the system are generally organized geographically. Special services by Telkom have numbers with special formats.

When dialed from another country, the national number is prefixed with the appropriate international access code and the telephone country code 27.

== Background ==
=== History ===
Numbers were allocated when South Africa had only four provinces, meaning that ranges are now split across the current nine provinces.

=== Namibia ===
South-West Africa (including Walvis Bay) was integrated into the South African numbering plan. However, the International Telecommunication Union (ITU) had already allocated country code 264 in the late 1960s.

Following its independence, Namibia discontinued direct dialing from South Africa and replaced it with international dialing using country code 264. For example, for a call from South Africa to Windhoek, before and after 1992:

Before 1992: 061 xxx xxxx
After 1992: 09 26461 xxx xxxx
After January 2007: 00 26461 xxx xxxx

=== Lesotho ===
Calls to Lesotho could be made using the access code 050 instead of the international code 266; for example, to call Maseru from South Africa, subscribers would dial 0501.

=== Botswana, Swaziland and Zimbabwe ===
Calls to Botswana, Swaziland and Zimbabwe could similarly be made using the regional codes 0192, 0194 and 0191, respectively, instead of the international codes 267, 268 and 263.

== Number ranges ==
=== 00 ===
International access code effective from 16 October 2006 and mandatory from 16 January 2007.

=== 01 ===
The old Transvaal province, currently comprising Gauteng, Mpumalanga, Limpopo and part of the North West:

010: New overlay plan for Johannesburg
011: Witwatersrand region around Johannesburg, currently code for the entirety of Greater Johannesburg
012: Pretoria and surrounding towns (also includes Brits)
013: Eastern Gauteng (Bronkhorstspruit) and Western and northern Mpumalanga: Middelburg, Witbank and Nelspruit
014: Northern North West and Southwestern Limpopo: Rustenburg and Modimolle
015: Northern and Eastern Limpopo: Polokwane
016: Vaal Triangle: Vereeniging, Vanderbijlpark and Sasolburg, which constitutes an anomaly, since Sasolburg isn't the old Transvaal.
017: Southern Mpumalanga: Ermelo
018: Southern North West: Mahikeng, Lichtenburg, Potchefstroom and Klerksdorp

=== 02 ===
Two-thirds of the old Cape province, now comprising Western and Northern Cape:

021: Cape Town metropole and surrounds, including Stellenbosch, Somerset West and Gordon's Bay
022: Boland and West Coast: Malmesbury
023: Worcester and greater Karoo, including Beaufort West
027: Namaqualand (Northern Cape): Vredendal, Calvinia, Clanwilliam, Springbok, Alexander Bay, Port Nolloth
028: Southern region: Swellendam and Caledon / Hermanus region.

=== 03 ===
KwaZulu-Natal:

031: Durban
032: KZN North coast region: Verulam, Tongaat, Ballito and Stanger
033: Pietermaritzburg and KwaZulu-Natal Midlands
034: Vryheid, Newcastle and Northern KZN
035: Zululand region: St. Lucia, Richards Bay, Ulundi
036: Drakensberg region: Ladysmith
039: KwaZulu-Natal South Coast region: Port Shepstone and interior, and Eastern Pondoland (in Eastern Cape)

=== 04 ===
Remainder of one-third of old Cape province, now comprising Eastern Cape and eastern parts of the Western Cape:

040: Bhisho
041: Gqeberha and Uitenhage
042: Southern region: Humansdorp
043: East London and surrounds
044: Garden Route, including Oudtshoorn, Knysna, Plettenberg Bay, Mossel Bay and George
045: Central region: Queenstown
046: Southern region: Grahamstown, Bathurst, Port Alfred, Kenton-on-Sea
047: Mthatha / most of previous Transkei
048: Northern region: Steynsburg
049: Western region: Graaff-Reinet

=== 05 ===
Free State and Northern Cape

051: Central and southern region: Bloemfontein, and Aliwal North in E Cape
053: Kimberley, eastern part of Northern Cape, far west of NW province
054: Upington, Gordonia region
056: Northern Free State: Kroonstad
057: Northern Free State: Welkom (Goldfields region)
058: Eastern Free State: Bethlehem

=== 06 (Cellular) ===
Cellular

0600: Cellular: Used by Liquid Telecommunications (South Africa)
0601 - 0602: Cellular: Used by TelkomSA (8.ta)
0603 - 0605: Cellular: Used by MTN
0606 - 0609: Cellular: Used by Vodacom
061: Cellular: Used by Cell C
062: Cellular: Used by Cell C
0630 - 0635: Cellular: Used by MTN
0636 - 0637: Cellular: Used by Vodacom
0640: Cellular: Used by MTN
0641 - 0645: Cellular: Used by Cell C
0646 - 0649: Cellular: Used by Vodacom
0650 - 0654: Cellular: Used by Cell C
0655 - 0657: Cellular: Used by MTN
0658 - 0659: Cellular: Used by TelkomSA (8.ta)
066: Cellular: Used by Vodacom
0670 - 0672: Cellular: Used by TelkomSA
0673 - 0675: Cellular: Used by Vodacom
0676 - 0679: Cellular: Used by TelkomSA (8.ta)
0680 - 0685: Cellular: Used by TelkomSA (8.ta)
0686 - 0689: Cellular: Used by MTN
0690: Cellular: Used by MTN
0691 - 0699: Cellular: Used by TelkomSA (8.ta)

=== 07 (Cellular) ===
0710: Cellular: Used by MTN
0711 - 0716: Cellular: Used by Vodacom
0717 - 0719: Cellular: Used by MTN
072: Cellular: Used by Vodacom
073: Cellular: Used by MTN
074: Cellular: Used by Cell C
0741: Cellular: Used by: Virgin Mobile as of June 2006 to September 2021
076: Cellular: Used by Vodacom
0771 - 0775: Cellular: Used by Vodacom
078: Cellular: Used by MTN
079: Cellular: Used by Vodacom

=== 08 ===
==== Cellular ====
0810: Cellular: Used by MTN
0811 - 0815: Cellular: Used by TelkomSA (8.ta)
0816: Cellular: Used by Rain
0817: Cellular: Used by TelkomSA (8.ta)
0818: Cellular: Used by Vodacom
0819: Cellular: Used by TelkomSA (8.ta)
082: Cellular: Used by Vodacom
083: Cellular: Used by MTN
084: Cellular: Used by Cell C

==== Special Services ====
080: FreeCall, Toll-free, called party pays
085: Cellular: USAL license holders - Vodacom and MTN have some prefixes out of this range for their USAL offerings
086: Sharecall, MaxiCall and premium-rate services, calls can be routed to regional offices automatically
0860: Sharecall Land line callers pay local call, called party pays long distance if applicable
0861: MaxiCall caller always pay long distance for call even if routed to local office
0862 - 9: Premium rate caller pays increasing rate linked to last digit
0862, 0865, 0866, 08673, 08774, 08676: Fax to Email caller always pay increasing rate linked to last digits
08622, 086294: Competition lines caller always pay premium rate
08671 - 08674: Information services caller always pay increasing rate linked to last digit
087: Value-added services (VoIP among others)
088: Fax Divert, Pagers and Telkom CallAnswer voicemail
089: Maxinet, for polls and radio call-in services

Note that from 10 November 2006, mobile number portability was introduced in the cellular market. The cellular prefixes as above are therefore not strictly applicable anymore, although they remain mostly unchanged.

=== 09X XXX XXX (Premium-rate and machine-related numbers) ===
090: Premium-rate services
0902: Premium-rated adult services
091: Premium-rate services
092: Premium-rate services
096: Machine-related services (14-digit numbers)
097: Machine-related services (14-digit numbers)
098: Machine-related services (14-digit numbers)

There are still some non-automated exchanges which use longer dialing codes, mostly for "farm lines" and remote areas with operator-assisted exchanges.

09X XXX XXXX numbers are no longer in use in South Africa.

== See also ==
- Telecommunications in South Africa
- Internet in South Africa
