= Leapeetswe Rapula Radiala Molotsane =

South African businessman

Leapeetswe (Papi) Rapula Radiala Molotsane is a South African businessman.

He served on the Board and as chief executive officer of Telkom (South Africa) from September 2005 to August 2008. Prior to joining Telkom, he was group executive of Transnet from February 2003 to August 2005 and chief executive officer of Fedics from January 1999 to January 2003. He was also employed as a manager with Nampak Sacks.

Molotsane has also been a director of Vodacom. He is currently a director of South Africa's America's Cup Challenge, a director of Fike Investment (Pty) Limited and a director of Arivia.kom.

Molotsane attended Howard University, Washington, DC, has a Bachelor of Science in Business Services and a Bachelor of Engineering Technology from the University of Toledo and Master of Science in Business Administration from the Hood College, Maryland. He also completed the Stanford Executive Program in the United States.
