= Blu Label Unlimited =

South African holding company

- Formerly: Blue Label Telecoms Limited
- Type: Public
- Traded as: JSE: BLU
- ISIN: ZAE000109088
- Industry: Investments; Media; Telecoms
- Incorporated: 2006; 20 years ago
- Founded: 2001; 25 years ago
- Founder: Mark Levy; Brett Levy
- Headquarters: Sandton, Gauteng, South Africa
- Area served: South Africa
- Key people: Mark Levy and Brett Levy (Joint CEOs); Peter Ralphs (Chairman)
- Services: Digital distribution Prepaid mobile services Financial services
- Revenue: ▼ R13.05 billion (2026)
- Operating income: ▼ -R5.2 billion (2026)
- Net income: ▼ -R4.88 billion (2026)
- Website: blug.co.za

Blu Label Unlimited is a South African holding company based in Sandton, Gauteng, with investments in telecoms, digital distribution, financial services, and other consumer and transactional businesses.

Founded in 2001, Blu Label Unlimited was originally established as a prepaid telecoms business and was listed on the JSE Limited in 2007. The company was known as Blue Label Telecoms until 2025, when it changed to its current name as part of restructuring.

As of October 2026, Blu Label has a 49.53% shareholding in Cell C, SA's fourth-largest mobile network operator.

== History ==
Blu Label's origins can be traced to the early 1990s, when brothers Mark Levy and Brett Levy began retailing electronics. They subsequently developed an electronics distribution business based partly on parallel imports, supplying independent retailers and wholesalers across South Africa. This distribution network later provided the foundation for the brothers' entry into prepaid telecoms.

The brothers founded Blue Label Investments in 2001. Around the same time, they entered the telecoms market after securing a contract with South African state-owned telco company Telkom to distribute prepaid fixed-line telephone products.

The brothers identified an opportunity to replace the physical distribution of prepaid cards with electronic distribution, and developed a system for vending prepaid airtime electronically. The business initially relied on existing retail relationships developed through the brothers' electronics distribution operations, and subsequently expanded its network of electronic points of sale.

In 2001, Blue Label Investments was founded by brothers Mark Levy and Brett Levy. Its predecessor, Blue Label Investments, initially focused on the distribution of prepaid telecommunications products in South Africa. The brothers had previously retailed electronics during the 1990s, and identified an opportunity to distribute prepaid airtime electronically rather than through physical vouchers. The business subsequently developed a network of electronic points of presence through which multiple digital products could be distributed.

During the 2000s, the company expanded from prepaid airtime into the electronic distribution of a wider range of products and services, including prepaid electricity, ticketing, and other digital vouchers. It also expanded internationally, establishing operations and partnerships in emerging markets including India, Mexico, and Nigeria. In India, its associate business Oxigen Services developed an electronic distribution network with Microsoft as a major shareholder and strategic partner.

In November 2007, the company was listed on the main board of the JSE Limited as Blue Label Telecoms Limited, following a restructuring. The listing raised approximately R1.32 billion. In the same month, Microsoft acquired a 12% shareholding in the company as part of a strategic collaboration focused on opportunities in emerging markets.

In 2017, the company made a strategic move into mobile network operations. Through its subsidiary The Prepaid Company, it acquired a 45% interest in major South African mobile service provider Cell C, for R5.5 billion. The transaction formed part of a wider recapitalization of Cell C, which was experiencing financial difficulties at the time.

In 2018, Blue Label also acquired local company 3G Mobile and a majority stake in Airvantage, also based in SA.

In September 2022, after several years of negotiations and restructuring, Blue Label and other stakeholders reached a recapitalization agreement that restructured Cell C's debt and provided additional liquidity, while shifting the operator toward a more capital-light model based on network sharing.

In 2025, Blue Label began a major restructuring, intended to separate Cell C from its other businesses, and reposition the group around its non-telecoms operations. To signify this change, in July that same year, the company announced plans to change its name to Blu Label Unlimited. The name change was approved by shareholders in August, and took effect in September 2025, with the JSE short name changing from Blue to Blu.

The restructuring culminated in the separate listing of Cell C on the JSE on 27 November 2025. Blu Label relinquished control of Cell C and retained a substantial minority interest.

== Operations ==
Blu Label operates the following divisions and companies:

Company	Division	Core business	Ref.
The Prepaid Company	Distribution & Payments	Prepaid distribution	
Blue Label Distribution	Distribution & Payments	Digital distribution	
Transaction Junction	Distribution & Payments	Payment services	
BluAdvance	Distribution & Payments	Consumer advances	
BluNova	Data Intelligence	Data and decision science	
Blue Label Data Solutions	Data Intelligence	Data services	
Blue Label Connect	Embedded Financial & Digital Services	Hybrid airtime and data	
BluCom	Embedded Financial & Digital Services	Digital communications	
Blu Train	Embedded Financial & Digital Services	Training and recruitment	
Cigicell	Infrastructure & Energy	Municipal revenue assurance	
BluEnergy	Infrastructure & Energy	Energy solutions	
Blue Label Media	Infrastructure & Energy	Media and advertising	

As of 2026, Blu Label owns 49.53% of South African mobile network operator Cell C.

== Corporate social responsibility ==
Blu Label's corporate social investment has historically focused on youth development, education, entrepreneurship, community development, and economic inclusion. The group describes its approach as part of its broader purpose of promoting financial inclusion and economic participation, particularly among underserved communities and small businesses.

In 2020, Blu Label established the Trust Blu Foundation, a nonprofit organization focused on reducing unemployment and inequality of opportunity by supporting informal, micro, and small enterprises. The foundation uses Blu Label's technology, expertise, and distribution reach to support nonprofit organizations and social enterprises, with a particular emphasis on economic inclusion.

== See also ==
- Media in South Africa
- Telecoms in South Africa
