= MetroFibre =

South African fiber network operator

Metro Fibre Networx
- Trade name: MetroFibre
- Type: Private
- Industry: Fiber internet infrastructure
- Founded: 2010; 16 years ago
- Founder: Steve Booysen; Malcolm Kirby; Johan van der Lith; Eugene Slabbert
- Headquarters: Centurion, Gauteng, South Africa
- Area served: South Africa
- Key people: Jan-Jan Bezuidenhout (CEO)
- Services: Wholesale fiber-optic connectivity
- Owner: AIIM; SAHIF; STOA
- Number of employees: 650 (2026)
- Website: metrofibre.co.za

MetroFibre, officially Metro Fibre Networx, is a South African fiber network operator (FNO), headquartered in Centurion, Gauteng.

Founded in 2010, the company is South Africa's fourth-largest FNO by network size. It initially provided fiber connectivity to businesses before expanding into the residential market in 2015.

== History ==
MetroFibre was founded in 2010, initially focusing on providing fiber connectivity to South African business clients. It later expanded into the fiber-to-the-home (FTTH) market, with its first residential services launched in 2015.

In March 2016, African Rainbow Capital (ARC) acquired an 18.14% shareholding in MetroFibre, providing additional capital for the latter's network expansion.

In March 2019, French investment company STOA acquired a 23.08% stake in MetroFibre, becoming a significant minority shareholder.

In November 2020, African Infrastructure Investment Managers (AIIM) acquired a minority stake in MetroFibre through Digital Infrastructure Investment Holdings, as part of a R1.5 billion equity funding round intended to support a capital expansion program of more than R3 billion over three years. The transaction also brought the South African Housing and Infrastructure Fund (SAHIF) into the company's shareholder base.

In 2021, AIIM, SAHIF, and STOA agreed to acquire a further 25.8% interest in MetroFibre from Sanlam Private Equity, ARC, and a minority shareholder. The transaction was completed in May 2022, bringing AIIM's total investment in MetroFibre to 37% and making it the company's largest single shareholder.

By 2024, MetroFibre's network passed a total of 500,000 homes. By the same year, the company had expanded its business network into Cape Town, having launched a 100-kilometer business fiber network in the city in 2023.

In 2024, Levoca acquired a 19.5% shareholding in MetroFibre, financed in part through a R725 million loan from the Public Investment Corporation (PIC). In January 2025, following defaults under the financing agreement, the PIC exercised its security rights over the shares and took control of the stake on behalf of the Government Employees Pension Fund.

In September 2026, MetroFibre and fellow fiber network operator Octotel, both backed by AIIM-led investment structures, confirmed that they were assessing merger opportunities.

== Operations ==
As of 2025, MetroFibre operates a network passing 515,000 homes. Of those, 175,000 are connected, resulting in an uptake ratio of 33.98%.

== See also ==
- Internet in South Africa
- Telecommunications in South Africa
