= Saix =

Saix, Saïx or SAIX may refer to:

- Saïx, a commune in Occitania, France
- Saix, Vienne, a commune in the Nouvelle-Aquitaine region of France
- Saïx (Kingdom Hearts), a fictional video-game character
- Tyler De Saix, pseudonym of Irish author Henry De Vere Stacpoole (1863–1951)
- SAIX, the South African Internet Exchange

== See also ==
- Le Saix, a commune in the Hautes-Alpes department, France
- Seix, a commune in the Occitanie region of France
