= Capitec Connect =

- Founder: Capitec Bank
- Headquarters: South Africa
- Products: Telecommunications
- Website: www.capitecbank.co.za/personal/connect/

Capitec Connect is a South African Internet service provider launched in 2022 by Capitec Bank.

Capitec Connect is a mobile virtual network operator (MVNO) based on Cell C's network. Unusually for the South African market, it offers data that doesn't expire at the end of each month.

As of February 2025, Capitec Connect claims to be the country's largest MVNO.
