= Benjamin Mophatlane =

South African businessman

Leetile Benjamin Mophatlane
- Born: Leetile Benjamin Mophatlane; 5 May 1973
- Died: 11 June 2014 (age 41)
- Education: University of Pretoria
- Occupation: CEO of Business Connexion Group
- Years active: 2007–2014
- Board member of: Business Connexion Group
- Spouse: Abena Saah

Leetile Benjamin Mophatlane (12 May 1973 – 11 June 2014) was a South African business magnate, and former Chief Executive Officer of Business Connexion Group. He died on 11 June 2014 after suffering cardiac arrest while in a meeting in Rosebank in Johannesburg.

In 1996 Benjamin, with his twin brother Isaac, co-founded what was then known as Business Connection. Business Connection subsequently merged with Seattle Solutions in 2001. He served as Managing Director until the company merged with Comparex Africa in 2004 and was renamed Business Connexion.

He served as Deputy Chief Executive officer until 2007 when he became Chief Executive Officer of Business Connexion. Well known within the information and communication technology industry, he has received numerous accolades Benjamin was a member of the Black Management Forum, the Electronic Industries Federation of South Africa, the Black Information Technology Forum and the Western Cape Investment and Trade Promotion Agency.

He died in June 2014.

== Personal life ==
Mophatlane was married to Abena-Saah, and they had three children.
