= Telecommunications in South Africa =

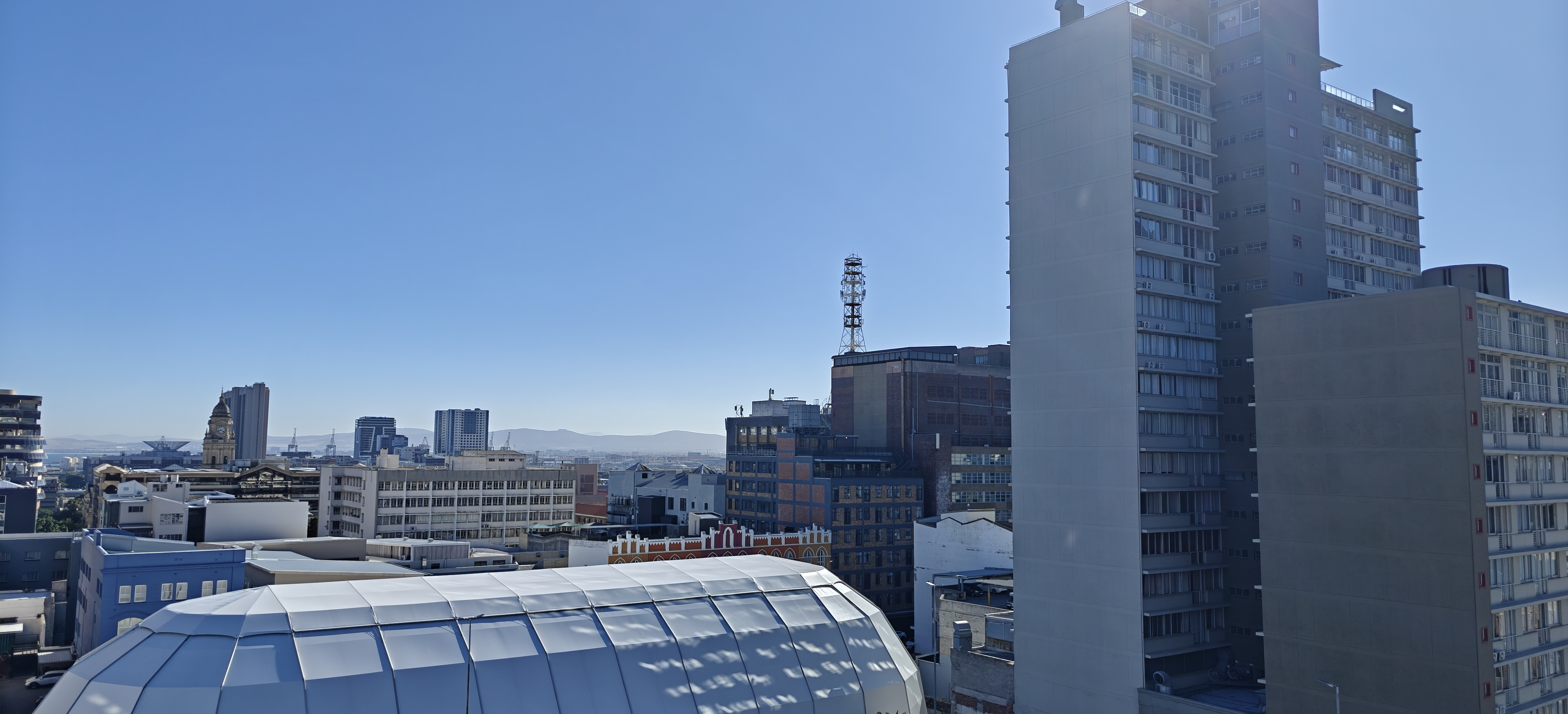
Comms tower in Cape Town CBD

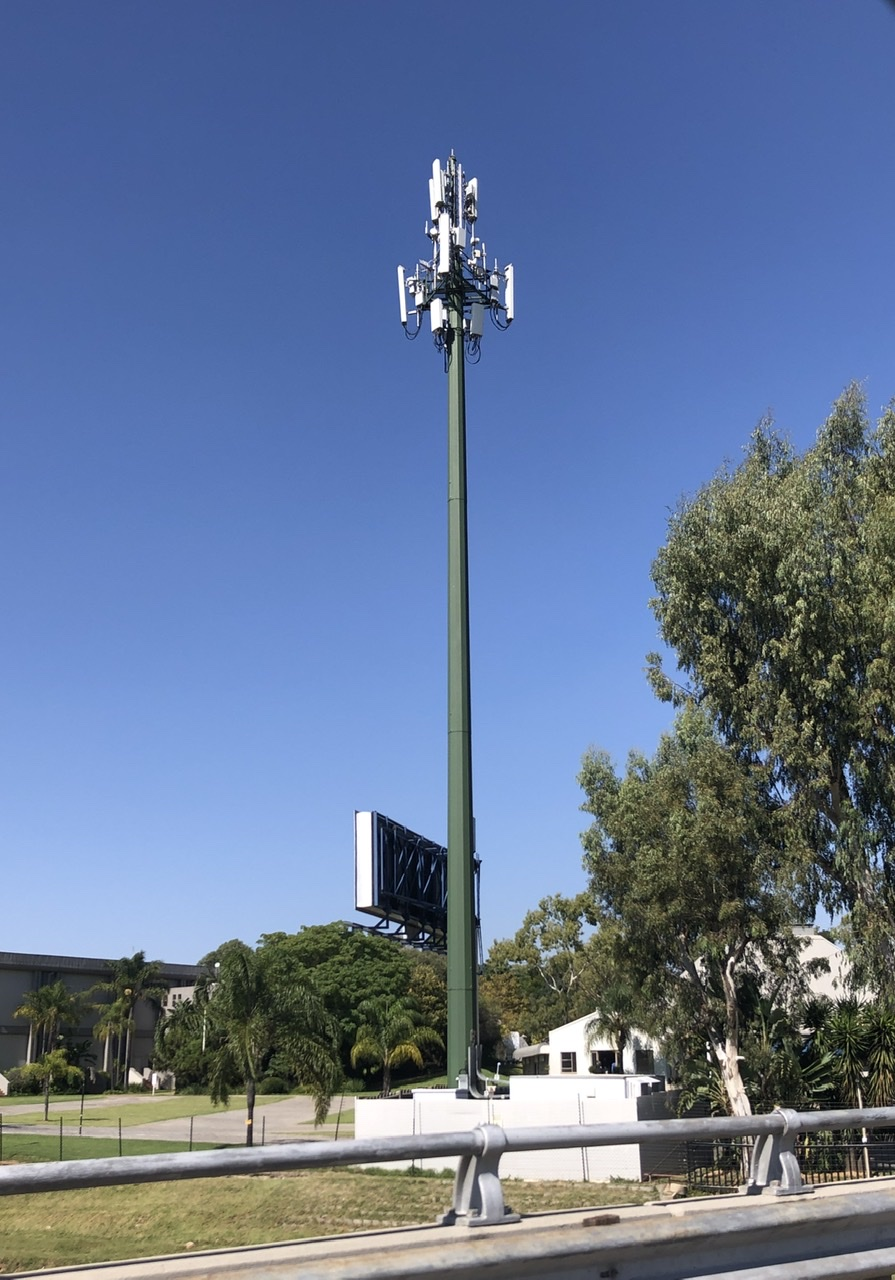
5G cell tower in Johannesburg

Telecommunications infrastructure in South Africa is advanced and widespread, comprising a combination of mobile, satellite, and fiber optic internet. Services are provided by many competing players in the private market, as well as by the South African Government through multiple public programs.

The Independent Communications Authority of South Africa (ICASA) is the watchdog of the telecommunications industry in the country. Legislation relating to telecommunications in South Africa is set by the Department of Communications and Digital Technologies.

The mobile connectivity market in South Africa is dominated by four cellular providers; Vodacom, MTN, Cell C, and Telkom Smaller mobile providers include Rain, as well as numerous MVNOs, like Melon, FNB Connect, Standard Bank Connect, and PnP Mobile.

Internet in South Africa is far more competitive than the mobile sector, especially in terms of ISPs. ADSL has been phased out in favor of fiber optic infrastructure. Fiber-to-the-premises for both residential and commercial users is common across the country. As of 2026, SA's largest fiber networks collectively pass around 7 million homes, with around 2.6 million of those connected, for a connectivity ratio of 41.97%.

== History ==
The first use of telecommunications in the Republic of South Africa was a single line telegraph connecting Cape Town and Simonstown. The first telegraph was launched on 2 December 1859, and the Cape of Good Hope Telegraph Company opened the line in April 1860.

At about the time of the Bell Telephone Company's development of the telephone industry post-1876, early undersea telegraph links were introduced, first connecting Durban and Europe, and later connecting the country to the rest of the world. In 1879, the first submarine cable system that connected South Africa with Europe started to work, through the East Coast cable of the South African Telegraph Company, a single channel cable.

In 1889, the first West Coast submarine cable from Cape Town to Europe was installed. The 1584 nm cable provided by CS Scotia was linked with West African Telegraph Companies' cables. Telcon carried out the links. Another cable to Cape Town was laid in 1899 during the Second Boer War, this time from Ascension Island, by the Eastern Telegraph Company (later Cable & Wireless plc).

In the mid-twentieth century undersea telephone cables were also commissioned. In 1968, the SAT-1 cable was laid. It connected from Melkbosstrand, South Africa to Sesimbra, Portugal.

The network continued to develop through internal financing in a heavily regulated market as international technology developed. At this point, telephone services were operated by the South African Post Office. In the 1960s, South Africa was connected to 72 nations and total outgoing annual international calls numbered over 28,800.

Telkom was incorporated on 30 September 1991 as a public limited liability company registered under the South African Companies Act, 61 of 1973, as amended.

In 1993 GSM was demonstrated for the first time in Africa at Telkom '93 in Cape Town. In 1994 the first GSM networks in Africa were launched in South Africa.

In 1994, South Africa launched a mobile operations, underwritten by Telkom in partnership with Vodafone, with 36,000 active customer on the network. This subsidiary grew to be Vodacom, which Telkom sold in late 2008 in preference for its own 3G network.

The first public videoconference between the continent of Africa and North America occurred on 24 June 1995 (2:00-3:00 p.m. PST). The Cybersafari Digital Be-In and Internet Love-Fest linked a technology fair at Fort Mason in San Francisco with a techno "rave" and cyber-deli in Woodstock, Cape Town. For one hour, members of the public communicated with each other via a simple Picturetel system using a 128 kb ISDN line. "Cognitive dissident" and communications activist David Robert Lewis initiated the video conference and peacecast on the San Francisco side, and Freddie Bell answered the call in Woodstock, Cape Town.

Because of different ISDN standards, a video bridge via Boston was used to achieve the link, which also featured interactive dancing. Organisations which took credit were technology sponsors Picturetel and Telkom, plus Peacecast organisers Unity 95, Parallel University, Vortex, Creativity Cafe and line producer "Cybersafari to Africa".

In 2004, the Department of Communications redefined the Electronics Communications Act, which consolidated and redefined the landscape of telecommunications licensing in South Africa (both mobile and fixed). The Independent Communications Authority (ICASA) currently licenses more than 400 independent operators with the Electronic Communications Network License (with the ability to self-provision) as well as issuing Electronic Communications Service Licenses for service deployment over infrastructure in the retail domain.

In late 2009, South Africa's mobile operators came under criticism by the government and public for high interconnect charges. The issue was discussed by the Parliamentary Committee on Telecommunications.

In 2020, MTN, Vodacom, and Rain launched independent 5G networks in South Africa.

== Internet ==
SA is of the most technologically resourced countries on the African continent. Over 74.7% of Internet traffic generated on the African continent originates from South Africa. In January 2025, there were 50.8 million internet users in South Africa, constituting 78.9% of the population.

South Africa has extensive fiber coverage across its major cities. There are over 15 fiber networks in South Africa, of various sizes. The largest fiber network operator (FNO) is Vumatel, which also owns smaller FNO Herotel. SA's second-largest FNO by network size is Openserve. Other notable FNOs include MetroFibre, Frogfoot, Octotel, Fibertime, Zoom Fibre, and Evotel. Most of these companies are headquartered in either the City of Cape Town or City of Johannesburg metro areas.

Minimum speeds have increased significantly since South Africa's main fiber roll-out, with many providers now starting packages at 50 Mbps. Residential fiber continues to expand rapidly. As of 2025, deployed fiber technology to residential properties in South Africa amongst the country's largest fiber network operators passes around 5.5 million homes.

Digital media freedom is respected in South Africa. Political content is not censored in any way, and journalists, bloggers, and other forms of content creators are not targeted for their online activities, and are free to post their views online (as long as they are not tantamount to hate speech). In 2013, Freedom House rated South Africa's "Internet Freedom Status" as "Free".

Existing Undersea fibre optic cables land at multiple points in South Africa, including Cape Town, Melkbosstrand, Duynefontein, Yzerfontein, Gqeberha, Mtunzini, Umbogintwini, and East London. As of mid-2026, multiple additional cables are planned.

== Mobile telecoms ==
South Africa has four major, locally-headquartered cellular providers; Vodacom, Cell C, Telkom, and MTN. There are also numerous MVNOs operating via the major four providers' networks, including Rain, Mr Price Mobile, Standard Bank Connect, PnP Mobile, Purple Mobile, FNB Connect, and Melon.

Approximately 99.7% of South Africans have 3G coverage, and around 86% have 4G. In recent years, a large-scale 5G rollout has been underway, especially in major metro areas.

Public Wi-Fi is commonly available in locations such as shopping centers, coffeehouses, supermarkets, and tourist attractions.

Subscriber information for South Africa's major mobile network providers is as follows:

Network provider	Parent	Headquarters	Subscribers	Year-over-year Change	Market share	Year-over-year Change	Data as at
Vodacom	Vodafone Group plc (65.1%)	Midrand	46.1 million	▲0.3%	38.37%	▼0.81%	2026
MTN	–	Johannesburg	39.5 million	▼0.7%	32.87%	▼1.74%	2026
Telkom	SA Government (40.52%)	Johannesburg	25.6 million	▲10.8%	21.37%	▲1.61%	2026
Cell C	Blu Label Unlimited (49.47%)	Sandton	8.8 million	▲17.1%	7.39%	▲0.94%	2026
Total	–	–	120 million *	–	100%	–	–

In terms of network speed, testing conducted from July through September 2026 produced the following results:

Operator	Download Speed	Upload Speed	Latency
Vodacom	260.12 Mbps	26.02 Mbps	24 ms
MTN	175.79 Mbps	35.19 Mbps	28 ms
Telkom	144.25 Mbps	15.69 Mbps	21 ms
Cell C	138.65 Mbps	32.00 Mbps	45 ms

== Television ==
Four main television stations are available to the public. These are namely SABC 1, SABC 2, SABC 3 and eTV. Other community-based stations are also on offer, such as Soweto TV and Cape Town TV.

DStv is currently South Africa's only satellite television provider, and Africa's largest. The company provides over 100 video and over 78 audio channels, and in 2008 introduced its first HD video channel. Since then an additional five HD channels have been introduced - namely M-Net HD, SuperSport HD, Discovery HD, SuperSport HD 2, M-Net Movies 1 HD and SuperSport HD 3.

In 2008, additional pay-TV licenses were granted to various companies in South Africa. As of January 2010, none of the companies granted a license have begun providing services. However, On Digital Media (ODM), have stated that they are on track to begin sale of their product in May 2010, and that prices will be significantly cheaper than their competitor DStv.

== See also ==
- Internet in South Africa
- Television in South Africa
