= South African Internet Exchange =

The South African Internet eXchange (SAIX) was a transit ISP erroneously marketed as an Internet exchange point. It was once the dominant provider serving Internet traffic in Southern Africa.

SAIX is run by Telkom, a semi-privatised South African company. At one time SAIX provided service to two-thirds of South Africa's ISPs. However, since deregulation that has declined to the point of insignificance. In 2020, OpenServe (the wholesale arm of the former Telkom) announced the service would be wound down.
