= Riagail of Bangor =

Abbot of Bangor (died 881)

Riagail of Bangor, a.k.a. Reghuil, Abbot of Bangor, died 881.

Canon O'Hanlon says of him

St. Reghuil, Abbot of Bangor, County of Down. - At the 11th of June, the Martyrology of Tallagh records a festival, in honour of Riagail, Bennchair. He flourished in the ninth century, and at a time when Bangor had been wasted by the Northmen. It appears to have recovered somewhat, during the period of his rule over it. In the Annals of the Four Masters, the death of this saint, called Ragallach, Abbot of Beannchair, is entered at the year 881. The Martyrology of Donegal, at this day, moreover, enters Reghuil, of Bennchor. The feast of St. Regail, of Bangor, is found also in Rev. Dr. Reeves' Calendar, at the same day.
