= GTool =

Spokeswoman

gTool
- Company type: Private
- Industry: Manufacturing
- Founder: George Hajipetrou
- Headquarters: Pretoria, South Africa
- Areas served: Worldwide
- Key people: George Hajipetrou (CEO)
- Products: The gTool ScreenJack, The gTool I Corner, The gTool PanelPress
- Website: gtool.com

gTool is a mobile repair tools manufacturing company. Its headquarters is in Pretoria, South Africa.

== History ==
gTool was founded by George Hajipetrou in a small mobile repair shop situated in the north of Johannesburg, South Africa. The company was created in order to meet the high demand for mobile phone repairs. The repair shop was later acquired by a corporate firm. This gave George Hajipetrou an opportunity to concentrate on developing repair tools.

== Products ==
gTool has created tools that allow mobile technicians to repair a range of mobile devices.

=== gTool DRS System ===
Revolutionary Display resource systems aimed at replacing the glass on mobile phones utilising space technology.

=== The gTool ScreenJack ===
The gTool ScreenJack was created in 2014. It is the world's first professional iPhone opening tool. The tool enabled the user to open the iPhone 5, iPhone5S and iPhone 5C with ease without compromising the faulty phone any further.

=== The gTool iCorner ===
The gTool iCorner is used to rectify dented corners and sidewalls on iPads and iPhones. It works as a vice which fits over the affected area and when the knob is turned, it conforms the corner back to its original shape.

=== The gTool PanelPress ===
The gTool PanelPress is the first and only solution for fixing bent iPhones. It is regarded as the only device to ‘’unbend’’ the iPhone 6. The PanelPress is designed to repair the iPhone 5, iPhone5S, iPhone 5C as well as the iPhone 6 and iPhone 6 plus. The unbending of the iPhone can be done by passing through a few easy steps.
