= Independent Communications Authority of South Africa =

- ICASA

Agency overview
- Formed: June 1, 2000; 26 years ago
- Preceding agencies: South African Telecommunications Regulatory Authority (SATRA); Independent Broadcasting Authority (IBA)
- Jurisdiction: South Africa
- Headquarters: Centurion, Gauteng
- Annual budget: R 3.03 billion (2026/27)
- Minister responsible: Solly Malatsi, Minister of Communications and Digital Technologies
- Agency executives: Mothibi G. Ramusi, Chairperson; Ms. Tshiamo Maluleka-Disemelo, CEO
- Child agency: Complaints and Compliance Committee
- Website: icasa.org.za

The Independent Communications Authority of South Africa (ICASA) is an independent regulatory body of the South African government, established in 2000 by the ICASA Act to regulate the telecommunications, broadcasting, and postal sectors of the country, in the public interest.

Historically, South African telecommunications and broadcasting services operated separately, as did the regulation of these sectors. Broadcasting in South Africa was regulated by the Independent Broadcasting Authority (IBA), whereas telecommunications was regulated by the South African Telecommunications Regulatory Authority (SATRA).

Rapid technological developments have led to the convergence of broadcasting and telecommunications services. This, in turn, influenced the convergence of their regulation, resulting in the merger of the IBA and SATRA. ICASA operates under the Department of Communications (DoC) and was initially composed of seven Council members.

The ICASA Amendment Act of 2006 incorporated postal services, which had previously been regulated by the Postal Authority, into ICASA's mandate. The number of Council members was increased from seven to nine to accommodate the new members from the Postal Authority.

The ICASA-approved label found on internationally manufactured products indicates that these products comply with the stipulated frequency requirements and the strict radio frequency interference standards set by ICASA.

== History ==
=== 1923–1989 ===
In South Africa, the first radio and television broadcasts were done in 1923 and 1976 respectively. The first Broadcasting Act was promulgated in 1936 and it established the South African Broadcasting Corporation (SABC) solely for radio broadcasting. In 1976, the Broadcasting Act was amended to include television broadcasting.

The SABC acted as a state broadcaster and was used as a political propaganda instrument of the government to support its policies. The SABC had monopoly over the airwaves even though there were some free-to-air broadcasting services in the former Bantustans. These broadcasting services (like Radio Bop, Bop TV, Capital Radio and Radio 702) partially overlapped from the Bantustan areas into certain parts of South Africa.

Telecommunications was provided and regulated by a monopoly parastatal, the South African Post and Telecommunications (SAPT). In the late 1980s, certain aspects of the telecommunications market were liberalised. The Private Automatic Branch Exchange (PABX) and Value-added Network Service (VANS) markets were opened up to competition.

=== 1990–2006 ===
In 1990 the Viljoen Task Group was appointed to investigate the future of broadcasting. At the same time the SABC initiated a process of internal restructuring. The restructuring was aided by the Jabulani! Freedom of Airwaves Conference which took place in the Netherlands in 1991. This conference made recommendations that set the terms of public debate.

In 1991, Telkom SA Limited (Telkom) was established as a parastatal to undertake the provision of telecommunications services in South Africa. It separated from SAPT, which acted as an industry regulator.

In the beginning of 1992, the Congress of Democratic South Africa (CODESA) started negotiations on the future democratic political dispensation of the country, the drafting of the Interim Constitution, the Local Government Transition Act and the establishment of the Independent Broadcasting Authority Act (the IBA Act).

The IBA Act was designed to provide, among other things, for the licensing of commercial and community broadcasters (these were not allowed under the apartheid government) and for the transformation of the SABC from a state to a public broadcaster. However, telecommunications reform remained unaddressed at the negotiations and in 1993 the apartheid government proceeded to license two mobile cellular operators (Vodacom and MTN).

After the 1994 elections, the National Telecommunications Forum (NTF), including government, business, labour, user groups and civic organizations was established as the key stake-holder forum which debated the Telecommunications Green and White Papers. South Africa's telecommunications reform process culminated in the Telecommunications Act of 1996.

The key aspect of this act was the establishment of an independent regulator, SATRA, to regulate the telecommunications sector. Telkom was also granted exclusivity to provide basic telecommunications services for a period of five years with an option for a further year of exclusivity should it meet its roll-out targets.

On 1 July 2000, the Independent Communications Authority of South Africa (ICASA) was established. It was established as a single electronic communications regulator in the country in terms of the ICASA Act of 2000 merging SATRA with the IBA.

In 2001, the second wave of re-regulation of the telecommunications industry took place with the passage of the Telecommunications Amendment Act of 2001. This Act introduced some far-reaching changes to the existing regime, for an example, the provision for the Second Network Operator (SNO) as of 7 May 2002.

In August 2001, the Minister of Communications issued policy directions which were amended in April 2002, setting out the process in relation to the licensing of the SNO (Neotel) in broad terms. The third mobile cellular telephone operator license was issued on 22 June 2001 to Cell C. On 19 August 2002, ICASA issued new national Mobile Cellular Telephone Service (MCTS) licenses in terms of section 37(1) of the Telecommunications Act to Vodacom and MTN.

In 2002, two new pieces of telecommunications-related legislation were passed, the Electronic Communications and Transactions Act (ECT Act) of 2000 and the Regulation of Interception of Communications and Provision of Communication-related Information Act (Interception Act). The ECA of 2005 was passed and came into effect on 19 July 2006.

=== Since 2007 ===
In 2013, ICASA led a state-wide campaign to encourage consumers to turn in their illegally-bought cordless phones, which were responsible for clogging the telecommunication networks with improper data properties. ICASA was also criticized for undermining the issue of high rates of mobile calls, and for not handling the monopolistic hold of MTN and Vodacom on the SA mobile market (91% of market shares).

In 2012, the broadcast request of TopTV (broadcaster of adult content channels Playboy TV, Desire TV and Private Spice) was refused by ICASA. In April 2013, ICASA allowed TopTV to broadcast between 8pm and 5am in April 2013 and then backtracked on its decision in July 2013.

In July 2016, ICASA launched the 700 MHz, 800 MHz and 2.6 GHz spectrum licences but the North Gauteng High Court blocked this auction after Cell C requested further reviews of the process.

In March 2021, the High court of Pretoria ordered ICASA to stop the biddings on the auction of the 5G spectrum that started in October 2020, after Telkom and Etv obtained an interdict in a separate case. In October 2021, ICASA reset the auction's deadline to March 2022.

== Mandate and purpose ==
ICASA's mandate is to regulate electronic communications (i.e. broadcasting and telecommunications) and postal services in the public interest. It derives its mandate from the following primary pieces of legislation (and subsequent amendments thereto):

- The Constitution of the Republic of South Africa;
- The Independent Communications Authority of South Africa Act No 13 of 2000 (ICASA Act);
- The Electronic Communications Act No 36 of 2005 (ECA)
- The Broadcasting Act No 4 of 1999;
- The Electronic Communications and Transaction Act No 25 of 2002 (ECT Act);
- The Promotion of Administration Justice Act No 3 of 2000 (PAJA).

Some of functions of ICASA include the following:

- To license broadcasters, signal distributors, providers of telecommunication services and postal services;
- To make regulations;
- To impose license conditions;
- To plan, assign, control, enforce and manage the frequency spectrum;
- To ensure international and regional co-operation;
- To consult with Ministry of Communications;
- To give effect to the EC Act of 2005; and
- Ultimately decide on complaints.

Below are some of the relevant sections from the legislations highlighting ICASA's mandate and purpose :-

- The Constitution of the Republic of South Africa
  - "The constitution of the Republic of South Africa (SA) places a duty on Parliament to establish an independent regulatory institution which is required to provide for the regulation of broadcasting in the public interest, and to ensure fairness and a diversity of views broadly representing South African society. Parliament has deemed it fit to add the regulation of electronic communications and postal services to this function." (ICASA, Mr Paris Mashile, 9 January 2007)(S192) <link>
  - ICASA is a licensing body, a regulator and a quasi judicial body because it licenses, regulates, adjudicates and issues sanctions.(S34)
  - ICASA is also an organ of state bound by the Bill of Rights (S8).
  - "The work of ICASA is aimed at the protection of democracy and ensuring free and open airwaves and access to accommodation." (S16)
- The Broadcasting Amentment Act of 2002
  - The Act amended the IBA Act of 1993, and sought to clarify the powers of the Minister and the regulator
  - The Act called for a new Broadcasting Policy that will, among others, contribute to democracy, development of society, gender equality, nation building, provision of education and strengthening the spiritual and moral fibre of society.
- The Independent Communications Authority of South Africa Act of 2006 (ICASA Amendment Act)
  - The primary object of this Act was to provide for the regulation and control of telecommunication matters in the public interest. It sought, among others, to promote the universal and affordable provision of telecommunication services (Chpt 1).
  - The Act established the South African Telecommunications Regulatory Authority, and this regulator shall be independent and impartial(Chpt II ).
- The Electronic Communications Act of 2005 (ECA)
  - The substantive regulatory function of ICASA is pertaining to broadcasting, postal services and electronic communications sector.
  - ICASA plays a concurrent function with Competition Commission of competition matters(Chapter 10).
  - The Code and mechanism of the National Association of Broadcasters on content regulation has been approved by ICASA (S54(2)).
  - ICASA strives to create a conducive and predictable regulatory environment to achieve the stated objects of EC Act of 2005, section 2 (S2).
- The Competition Act of 1998
  - The Competition Commission and Competition Tribunal plays a complementary role or co-jurisdiction role with ICASA on competition matters within the electronic communications environment (s82 (1)).
  - The Competition Commission holds an ex post jurisdiction over competition related matters. ICASA holds an ex ante and ex post jurisdiction over competition related matters.
- The Promotion of Administration Justice Act of 2000 (PAJA) and
  - PAJA binds ICASA in its deciding functions and the Complaints and Compliance in their exercise of their administrative and judicial functions. According to Mr Paris Mashile (9 January 2007, p. 5) "...ICASA has been entrusted, full consultation and transparency are governing principles as prescribed by PAJA and the law dictates of administrative justice.
- The Postal Services Act of 1998

== Structure and functions ==
=== Divisions ===
ICASA is subdivided into various divisions with some listed below:-

- The Engineering and Technology Division is made up of the frequency spectrum and the radio monitoring departments. The main responsibilities include frequency and station license allocations, issuing of certificates and authorizations.
- The Licensing and Compliance Division is responsible for developing policy, issuing licenses and ensuring compliance in relation to the provision of broadcasting, telecommunications and postal services.
- The Markets and Competition Division is responsible for promoting competition, innovation and investment in services and facilities provided in the broadcasting, telecommunications and postal services sectors.
- The Complaints Division receives and addresses complaints from consumers and members of the public regarding communication services and products. The department intervenes or escalates these complaints to operators for resolution or to the Complaints & Compliance Committee (CCC) for adjudication.
- The Consumer Affairs Division is responsible for protecting consumers from unfair business practices, ensuring access to safe and good quality products, and protecting the interests of people with disabilities in relation to the provision of communications and postal services.
- The Legal Division is responsible for the litigation of regulatory matters.
- The Communications Division is responsible for the Authority's corporate communications and international relations.

=== Council ===
The Council is the highest decision-making body at ICASA, composing of nine members, the chairman and eight councilors appointed by the minister with the recommendations from the National Assembly. Initially, the number of council members was seven and it was increased to nine as per the ICASA amendment Act of 2005 when the postal services were integrated to ICASA.

==== Current Chairperson, Councillors and Secretariat ====
- Mothibi G. Ramusi (Chairperson)
- Thabisa Faye (Councillor)
- Dr. Charles Lewis (Councillor)
- Andrew Matseke (Councillor)
- Dr Tshifhiwa Maumela (Councillor)
- Karabo Mohale (Councillor)
- Catherine Mushi (Councillor)
- Nompucuko Nontombana (Councillor)
- Ntombiza Sithole (Councillor)
- Nicholous Mabilane (Company Secretary)

==== Previous Chairpersons ====
- Mothibi Ramusi (Chairperson)(2 May 2024 - current)
- Catherine Mushi (acting Chairperson)(4 April 2024 - 1 May 2024)
- Yolisa Kedama (acting Chairperson)(4 April 2023 - 3 April 2024)
- Dr Charley Lewis (acting Chairperson)(16 July 2022 - 3 April 2023)
- Dr Keabetswe Modimoeng (24 August 2020 - 15 July 2022)
- Adv Dimakatso Qocha (acting Chairperson) (11 June 2020 - 23 August 2020)
- Dr Keabetswe Modimoeng (acting Chairperson) (25 March 2019 - 10 June 2020)
- Rubben Mohlaloga (1 December 2017 - 24 March 2019)
- Paris Mashile (acting Chairperson) (September 2017 - November 2017)
- Rubben Mohlaloga (acting Chairperson)(June 2016 - September 2017)
- Rotation of acting appointments between Councillors (July 2015 - June 2016)
- Dr Stephen Sipho Mncube (July 2010 – July 2015)
- Paris Mashile (1 July 2005 – 30 June 2010)
- Mandla Langa (1 July 2000 – 30 June 2005)

== Highlights and Controversies ==
In February 2000, a little less than five months before ICASA was formed, SATRA declared Cell C as a winning bidder of the third mobile cellular network operator. NextCom, one of the losing bidders, engaged ICASA in a number of court interdicts alleging that the decision to award Cell C was not fair and was influenced by the National Executive.

In June 2001, NextCom withdrew from a judicial review that was ordered by the High Court allowing Cell C to continue its operations. Vodacom and MTN threatened to go to court to claim the use of the 1800 MHz frequency band which GSM 1800 license was issued only to Cell C.

The conversion of the VANS licenses issued through the repealed Telecommunications Act to the new ECNS or ECS licenses provisioned in the EC Act resulted in a court interdict where Altech challenged ICASA on its decision to exclude it on the list of the new ECNS licensees. Altech's claim was that all the VANS licensees be granted the ECNS licenses as per the EC Act. The High Court judgment ruled in favour of Altech resulting in all the VANS licensees being granted ECNS licenses.

The listing and unbundling of Vodacom shares raised a number of questions regarding the role and independence of ICASA as the sector regulator. Vodacom exercised its right as granted by the Electronic Communications Network Services license issued by ICASA to unilaterally sell its shares without the involvement of ICASA or Minister of Communications, as it was the case in the previous licensing regime.

The sale was not well received by major South African trade union COSATU, which challenged the decision made by ICASA to clear the Vodacom share transaction. This transaction resulted in ICASA's independence status being questioned as it was influenced by COSATU to rescind its initial decision allowing Vodacom to unbundle its shares.
