= Octotel =

South African fiber network operator

- Type: Private
- Industry: Fiber internet infrastructure
- Founded: 2015; 11 years ago
- Founder: Robert Gilmour; Mark Slingsby; Joe Botha
- Headquarters: Cape Town, South Africa
- Area served: South Africa
- Key people: Trevor van Zyl (CEO)
- Services: Wholesale fiber-optic connectivity
- Owner: AIIM; STOA; Thebe Investment Corporation
- Website: octotel.co.za

Octotel is a South African open-access fiber network operator (FNO). Founded in 2015, the company is headquartered in Cape Town.

As of 2025, Octotel operates a fiber network in the Western Cape that has passed around 400,000 homes and connected around 135,000 customers. The company provides wholesale connectivity via around 50 ISPs.

== History ==
Octotel was founded in 2015 as a fiber network operator in the Western Cape, building an open-access network through which ISPs could offer retail services to customers.

In October 2020, UK infrastructure investment firm Actis acquired a controlling interest in Octotel for a total of R2.3 billion. At the time, Octotel's network had passed over 175,000 premises. Founders Robert Gilmour and Mark Slingsby retained minority interests in the company.

During Actis' ownership, Octotel substantially expanded its network. Between October 2020 and March 2024, the number of homes and businesses passed by its fiber network increased from 195,000 to 350,000, while the number of connected customers increased from 56,000 to 110,000.

In November 2022, Octotel secured a R2 billion five-year loan from RMB to refinance existing debt and fund its network expansion. Specifically, the financing was linked to the expansion of connectivity in lower-income areas.

In March 2024, Actis agreed to sell Octotel to a consortium led by African Infrastructure Investment Managers (AIIM), which included STOA and Thebe Investment Corporation. The acquisition was completed in September 2024.

In 2026, Octotel and fellow fiber network operator MetroFibre began assessing a potential merger, with both companies having the same AIIM-led investor base.

== Operations ==
As of 2025, Octotel operates a fiber network that has passed around 400,000 homes and connected approximately 135,000 customers, for an uptake ratio of 33.75%. It is South Africa's sixth-largest fiber network operator (FNO) by network size.

== See also ==
- Internet in South Africa
- Telecommunications in South Africa
