= Retief, de Ville & Co. =

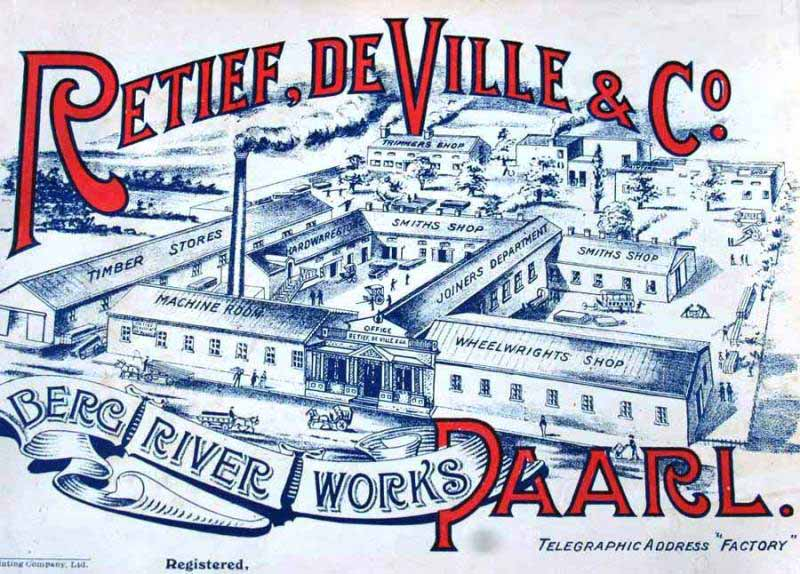

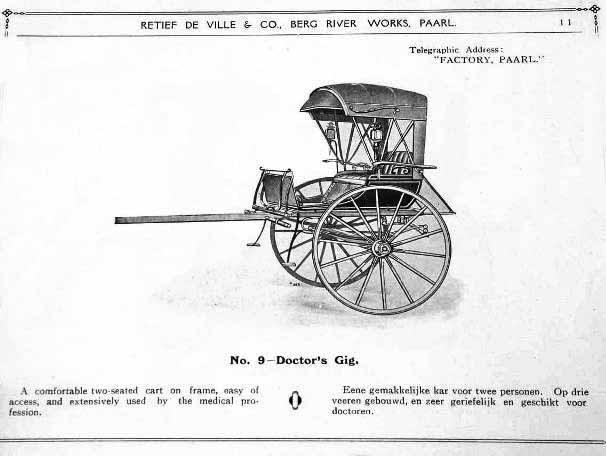

Retief, de Ville & Co. were coachbuilders based in Paarl in the Western Cape, flourishing at a time when the Kimberley Diamond Rush and Witwatersrand Gold Rush saw an upsurge in the demand for reliable conveyances in South Africa.

== History ==
The diamond rush of the 1870s created a pressing demand for transport, causing enormous production problems for the wagonmakers of Paarl and Wellington, who earlier had taken weeks to finish carts and wagons. A Paarl businessman, Pieter Bernardus de Ville, initiated the importing of steam-driven machinery, a move which was soon followed by others, and which changed the industry from traditional hand-manufacturing to a simple assembling of imported components. De Ville later amalgamated with J. P. Retief to form 'Retief, de Ville & Co'. In the 1920s their rival J. F. Phillips and Co. bought the company, becoming the largest wagon manufacturer in South Africa. Phillips introduced a 24-hour production line. The heyday of the industry was in the 1880s but even after the railhead had reached Kimberley and its diamond diggings in 1885, the demand for Paarl's conveyances continued. A census in 1891 found that the main centres of wagon-making were Paarl, Worcester, Oudtshoorn, Grahamstown, King William's Town and Cape Town, and that in 1887 there were no fewer than 220 small enterprises involved in wagon manufacturing in the Cape Colony.

Wagon-making was an essential service in the early history of the Cape Colony. On an eighteenth-century map a “wamaker” (wainwright) was marked in the valley of the Berg River, information critical to those who used wagons of any description - present-day Wellington still has a place named “Wamakersvallei” (wainwright valley). The industry spawned a multitude of smaller services and suppliers – blacksmiths, carpenters, woodturners, painters and decorators, wheelwrights, joiners, tanners, upholsterers, harnessmakers, canopy makers, and suppliers of Swedish steel, American hickory and local woods. Coachbuilders supplied an extensive range of vehicles to satisfy customers' needs - Retief, de Ville had no fewer than 91 models ranging from light gigs to heavy transport wagons. The wagonbuilder catered for the diverse needs of the community and manufactured service carts for use as ambulances, police carts and refuse removal, delivery, hearses, bakery carts and the "kakebeenwa", a capacious family-sized wagon for long-distance travel. In addition there were wool wagons, hay wagons, water carts, and elegant gigs for the use of doctors and judges. The completion in 1863 of a rail link between Cape Town and Wellington, which passed through Paarl, and the simultaneous construction of a telegraph line, helped the local wagon-making industry enormously - parts for construction of the wagons could conveniently be railed from Cape Town, assembled, and the finished wagons could be sent back.

When the 1820 Settlers had landed in Algoa Bay, they and their possessions were transported to their farms on wagons made in Paarl. After the transport boom many of the smaller wagon and carriage builders went insolvent, and it fell to the larger companies to provide transport to the Boer and British forces in the Boer Wars, the campaign in South West Africa and South African forces in East Africa during World War I. The quality of the Paarl wagons led to the placing of orders by Italian dictator Benito Mussolini for use in his infamous campaigns in Abyssinia. The Howitzer guns used by South African forces in World War II had carriages made in Paarl, two such guns being on display at the Union Buildings.
