= H Pistorius & Co =

H Pistorius & Co is a private South African company based in Pretoria, which according to its website is the oldest supplier of agricultural lime in Africa. The company is also the backbone for the personal wealth of the Pistorius family (one member being Oscar Pistorius).

H. Pistorius & Co. is involved in the processing, mining, marketing and distribution of agricultural and industrial limestone. The company was founded in 1944 by the "Lime King", Hendrik Wilhelm Carl (Oom Hendrik) Pistorius (born on August 29, 1917) Oom Hendrik is the father of four sons, Theo, Arnold, Henke and Leo, and three daughters, Sonia Grobler, Heidi Drew and Reine Malan.

The third son, Heinrich Carl Wilhelm (Henke) Pistorius (born March 15, 1953) is the father of the sprinter Oscar Pistorius (born on November 22, 1986).

The Pistorius family holds 100 percent interest in 10 companies through H. Pistorius & Co. Ltd. The youngest brother, Leo Pistorius, is the current managing director and CEO at H Pistorius & Co. which also holds 25 percent to 60 percent in 40 other companies.

According to the South African newspaper Beeld, Oom Hendrik and three of his sons, Theo, Arnold and Leo, own nearly 120 companies and have further business involvement in transport, armoured vehicles, property development, tourism in Mozambique, Austria and South Africa.
