= FNB Connect =

- Founder: FNB
- Headquarters: South Africa
- Products: Telecommunications
- Website: www.fnb.co.za/fnb-connect/shop.html

FNB Connect is a South African Internet service provider which operates as a business unit within FirstRand Bank Limited (“FRB”). FNB is a division of one of FRB and one of the "big four" Banks in the South African market.

The move into telecommunications was unprecedented at the time and in addition to normal banking products and services, FNB now offers telecommunications value added services.

FNB Connect is a supplier of data for South African ADSL subscribers.

FNB Connect also offers VoIP services for its clients.

It is one of the first South African VoIP suppliers to have developed a VOIP application for the iPhone, Windows Mobile and Symbian mobile phones plus a PC version for Windows and Linux and a web based digital phone.
