= Business Connexion Group =

South African telecoms company

Business Connexion Pty Ltd

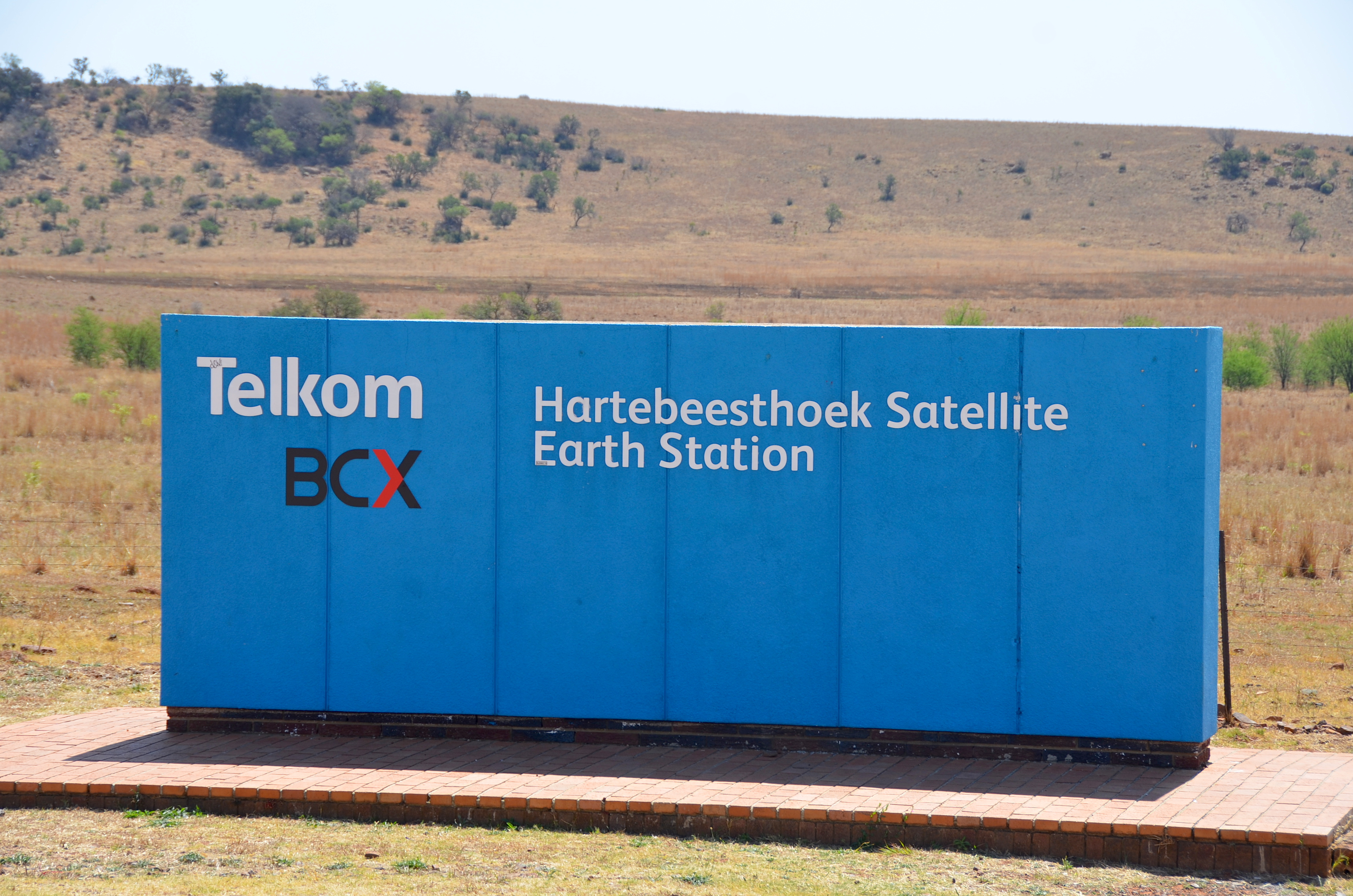
- Entrance of the Telkom BCX Hartebeesthoek Satellite Earth Station
- Trade name: BCX
- Type: Subsidiary
- Industry: ICT
- Founded: 1979; 47 years ago
- Headquarters: Centurion, Gauteng, South Africa
- Number of locations: 21 data centers
- Area served: Africa; Europe; Middle East
- Key people: Hasnain Motlekar (Acting CEO)
- Services: IT services Cybersecurity; Telecoms; Cloud computing Managed services
- Revenue: ▼ R12.35 billion (2025)
- Number of employees: 2,000+ (2026)
- Parent: Telkom
- Website: bcx.co.za

BCX, officially Business Connexion Pty Ltd, is a South African ICT company, and a subsidiary of major local telecoms company Telkom. The group has operations in Africa, Europe, and the Middle East, and has the largest data center capacity in Southern Africa.

As of 2026, the company operates a total of 21 data centers, and employs over 2,000 people.

== History ==
The origins of BCX can be traced to 1979, when Persetel was established. In 1997, Persetel merged with Q Data to form Persetel Q Data Holdings. The group acquired several European networking businesses before changing its name to Comparex Holdings in November 1998. In 2000, it sold its European networking business to Dimension Data, while its South African operation was renamed Comparex Africa in 2001.

Separately, brothers Benjamin and Isaac Mophatlane founded Business Connection in 1996. The company merged with Seattle Solutions in 2001, and subsequently expanded through acquisitions and other investments.

In December 2003, Comparex announced its intention to merge with Business Connection. The transaction was completed in April 2004, creating Business Connexion. The operating company was renamed Business Connexion Pty Ltd, and its holding company became Business Connexion Group Ltd. The group was listed on the JSE in April 2004, under the share code BCX.

Following the merger, Business Connexion expanded through a number of acquisitions. These included Intrinsic Technology in 2004, Bidvest Network Solutions in 2005, and SiloFX in 2007. In 2010, it acquired several businesses from UCS Group for R614.2 million, including UCS Solutions and UCS Technology Services. In 2011, BCX acquired a controlling interest in Canoa, and in 2012 acquired Integr8 IT.

In 2007, major South African telecoms company Telkom made an unsuccessful attempt to acquire BCX.

In 2015, Telkom acquired the entire issued share capital of Business Connexion Group for approximately R2.7 billion. The acquisition was completed on 31 August 2015, following regulatory approval, and BCX was subsequently delisted from the JSE. The acquisition expanded Telkom's business beyond telecoms connectivity into ICT services, and provided BCX with greater scale through integration with Telkom's existing operations.

In 2016, Telkom and Business Connexion began the integration of their business operations under the Telkom Business Connexion name. BCX co-founder Isaac Mophatlane was appointed chief executive of the new business.
