= Telkom (South Africa) =

Telecommunications provider in South Africa

Telkom SA SOC Limited
- Type: Public
- Traded as: JSE: TKG
- ISIN: ZAE000044897
- Industry: Telecoms
- Founded: 1991; 35 years ago in its current form and 1910; 116 years ago as the Department of Posts and Telegraphs
- Headquarters: Centurion, Gauteng, South Africa
- Area served: 38 countries
- Key people: Sello Moloko (Chairman); Serame Taukobong (Group CEO)
- Products: Wireless and wireline broadband services Digital television Managed services Web hosting
- Revenue: ▲ R42.46 billion (2024)
- Operating income: ▲ R9.42 billion (2024)
- Net income: ▲ R1.88 billion (2024)
- Total assets: ▲ R61.19 billion (2024)
- Total equity: ▲ R26.17 billion (2024)
- Number of employees: 9,877 (2024)
- Divisions: Telkom Consumer; Telkom Mobile; Telkom Small & Medium Business
- Subsidiaries: BCX (100%); Trudon t/a Yellow Pages (64.9%); Gyro Group (100%); Openserve (100%); Swiftnet
- Website: telkom.co.za

Telkom has a 100% shareholding of major South African fiber network operator (FNO) Openserve

Telkom (officially Telkom SA SOC Limited) is a South African wireline and wireless telecommunications provider, operating in more than 38 countries across the African continent. Headquartered in Centurion, Gauteng, Telkom is one of South Africa's largest telecommunications companies by annual revenue.

Telkom is listed on the JSE Limited; South Africa's main stock exchange. As of 2024, the company had a market capitalization of R15.3 billion, and employed around 10,000 individuals.

== History ==
The first use of telecommunication in South Africa happened in April 1860 was a single line telegraph connecting Cape Town and Simonstown. In 1879, the first undersea links were introduced, first connecting Durban and Europe. In the 1960s, South Africa was connected to 72 nations and total outgoing annual international calls numbered over 28,800. Telkom emerged in 1991 from the South African Department of Post and Telecommunications (SAPT), the former postal and telecommunications service provider. The Post Office Amendment Act 1991 split the department into the Postal Service (SAPO) and the Telecommunications Service (Telkom).

In 1994, South Africa launched its mobile operations, underwritten by Telkom in partnership with Vodafone. This subsidiary grew to be Vodacom, which Telkom sold in late 2008 in preference for its own 3G network (established as 8ta, but now Telkom Mobile).

Vodacom has a subscriber base of more than 45M, with an average revenue per user of more than R60 across both rural and urban subscribers. Vodacom, together with the other operators, have come under criticism in late 2009 by government and the public for high interconnect charges.

Telkom was managed by US-based SBC Communications (now AT&T Inc.) from 1997 to 2004. SBC has since sold its interest in the company, after reducing operational expenditure (reducing staff resources, etc.) and increasing revenue by increased product prices, thereby increasing the share-price for greater ROI.

In 2005, the Department of Communications redefined the Electronics Communications Act, which consolidated and redefined the landscape of telecommunications licensing in South Africa (both mobile and fixed).

In 2008, the company was the market leader in the broadband space, with more than 500,000 customers on 2-40 Mbit/s DSL; it dominates the managed services market and has more than 250 corporate customers on its order book. Telkom SA operates 4.5M fixed access lines, bases on its 2008 Annual Report. The competitive landscape in South African telecommunications has evolved significantly in recent years, providing residents with far more options for connectivity than they had before, including far faster speeds via fiber-to-the-premises infrastructure.

Jeffrey Hedberg was appointed acting group chief executive officer on 7 July 2010 following Reuben September's resignation. Jeffrey was the CEO of Cell C from 2006 to 2009. However, on 13 January 2011, TechCentral reported that Hedberg would quit Telkom by the end of March 2011, citing that he felt that he would not be given the mandate he needed to fix Telkom commercially and operationally.

In 2013, allegations of corruption in terms of poor procurement practice, nepotism and mismanagement were unveiled.

Telkom acquired Business Connexion in August 2015 for approximately ZAR 2.6 billion with the strategic intent of obtaining a significant presence in the Information Technology (IT) market in South Africa.

This was the second attempt at the acquisition by Telkom and was subject to a number of prescribed conditions set out by the competition authorities i.e. one of which was to ensure minimal impact on staff retrenchments. The integration of the two organisations enabled a new and compelling value proposition to be offered to private and public business customers in the domestic market.

Despite poor financial performance in years prior, and a R9.97 billion loss in its 2023 financial year, in 2024, Telkom reported a strong turnaround. The group made a substantial profit of R1.88 billion, and had assets in excess of R61 billion.

== Group structure ==
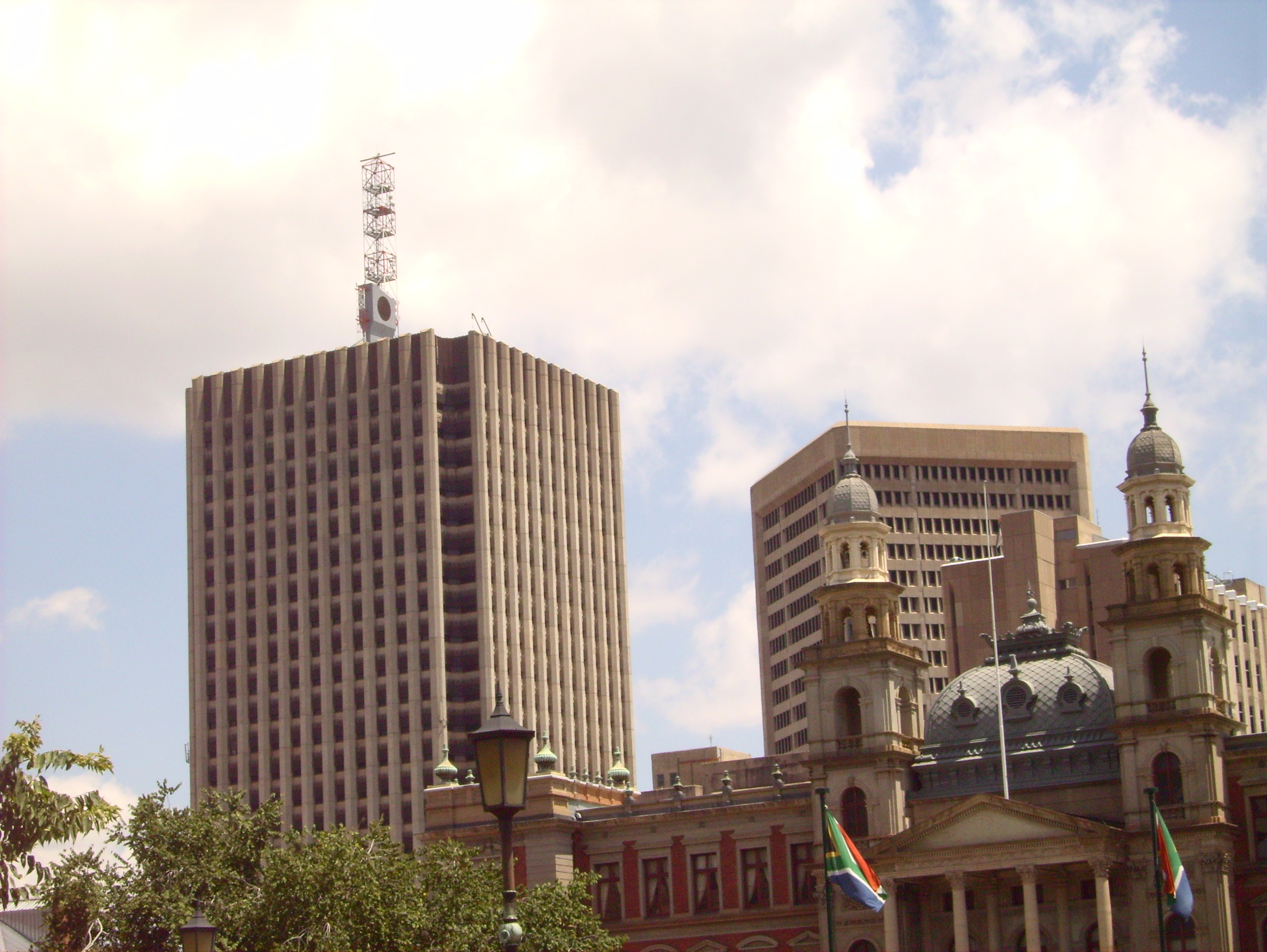
Telkom Group Head Office, as seen from Church Square in Pretoria - City Centre (Direction: NNW)

Telkom SA, as a group, comprises Telkom Business, Telkom Mobile, Consumer Marketing, Cloud, IT Operations, and its Wholesale and Networks division (Openserve).

Cybernest focuses on Telkom's DCO infrastructure in Cape Town, Pretoria, and Johannesburg, as well as services thereupon, including data hosting, LAN and application management, and IT infrastructure management for large business customers.

Openserve is a licensed infrastructure service provider, installing fiber-to-the-home connections throughout South Africa, and providing services to Internet service providers (ISPs). In 2021, Openserve joined the Internet Service Providers' Association of South Africa.

Telkom Group Limited includes South African subsidiaries BCX, Gyro, and Openserve.

The company's FastNet subsidiary was incorporated into BCX in 2018, including all its enterprise wireless solutions, including microwave, satellite, 4G/5G, and Wi-Fi solutions.

== Products and services ==
=== Telkom ADSL ===
Telkom provides ADSL retail services via their ISP Telkom Internet to consumer and business customers, and through Telkom Wholesale to other licensed operators. Most ISPs in South Africa, such as Afrihost, utilise Telkom's copper infrastructure for reselling ADSL services.

Telkom provides ADSL with POTS. According to Telkom's figures, 92% of exchanges have been upgraded to support ADSL. Telkom is currently the largest provider of fixed-line broadband in the country, with 412 190 subscribers according to the 2008 annual report.

Telkom ADSL is billed as an add-on service to a POTS voice line. A PPPoE account, which can be provided by most ISPs, must be purchased separately to the ADSL connection for internet access. ISPs are divided into two categories, those who purchase IPConnect from Telkom and those who resell PPPoE accounts from IPConnect ISPs or Telkom themselves. IPConnect is a Telkom bit-stream access product allowing ISPs to route internet bandwidth from their ADSL subscribers over their own bandwidth.

Originally, three connection rate ranges are offered (associated with different connection fees) which are "Fast" (1024/384 kbit/s), "Faster" (up to 2048/512 kbit/s), "Fastest" up to (10240/1002 kbit/s (ADSL2+)) of bandwidth for downstream/upstream respectively existed. The actual speed obtained can vary depending on line conditions. These connection rate ranges have since changed, with the minimum speed currently being 2048/512 kbit/s and mid-range 5120/512 kbit/s.

Telkom have released a 10 Mbit ADSL 2+ service for a limited amount of "Fastest" users on 15 August 2010.

From 18 October 2011, Telkom Internet launched business offerings, and has subsequently increased value with speed upgrades and improved prioritisation for business users, as well as converting products to include soft-capping (unlimited browsing).

Telkom Internet offers business and residential SoftCap packages (as of 1 February 2012).

As of 24 August 2012, "Faster" (1024 kbit/s) users started reporting speed upgrades to 2 Mbit/s (2048 kbit/s) on their ADSL Lines. As of 2 September 2012, Telkom have begun the process of trialing 40 Mbit/s VDSL and FTTx.

=== Telkom 3G ===
Telkom had offered 3G products available since 2008. The coverage was initially limited to a small part of the country. Telkom entered the South African Cellular market under the brand 8ta. The public launch of the network took place on 14 October 2010 and products have been available since 18 October 2010, supporting both GSM and 3G services.

=== Telkom Music ===
Telkom partnered with Tencent Africa to launch the Telkom Music, a music streaming service that is made available via the Telkom Music Powered By JOOX app in South Africa on 22 July 2021. The Telkom Music Powered by JOOX app was reviewed by Arthur Goldstuck, founder of World Wide Worx.

== Pan African operations ==
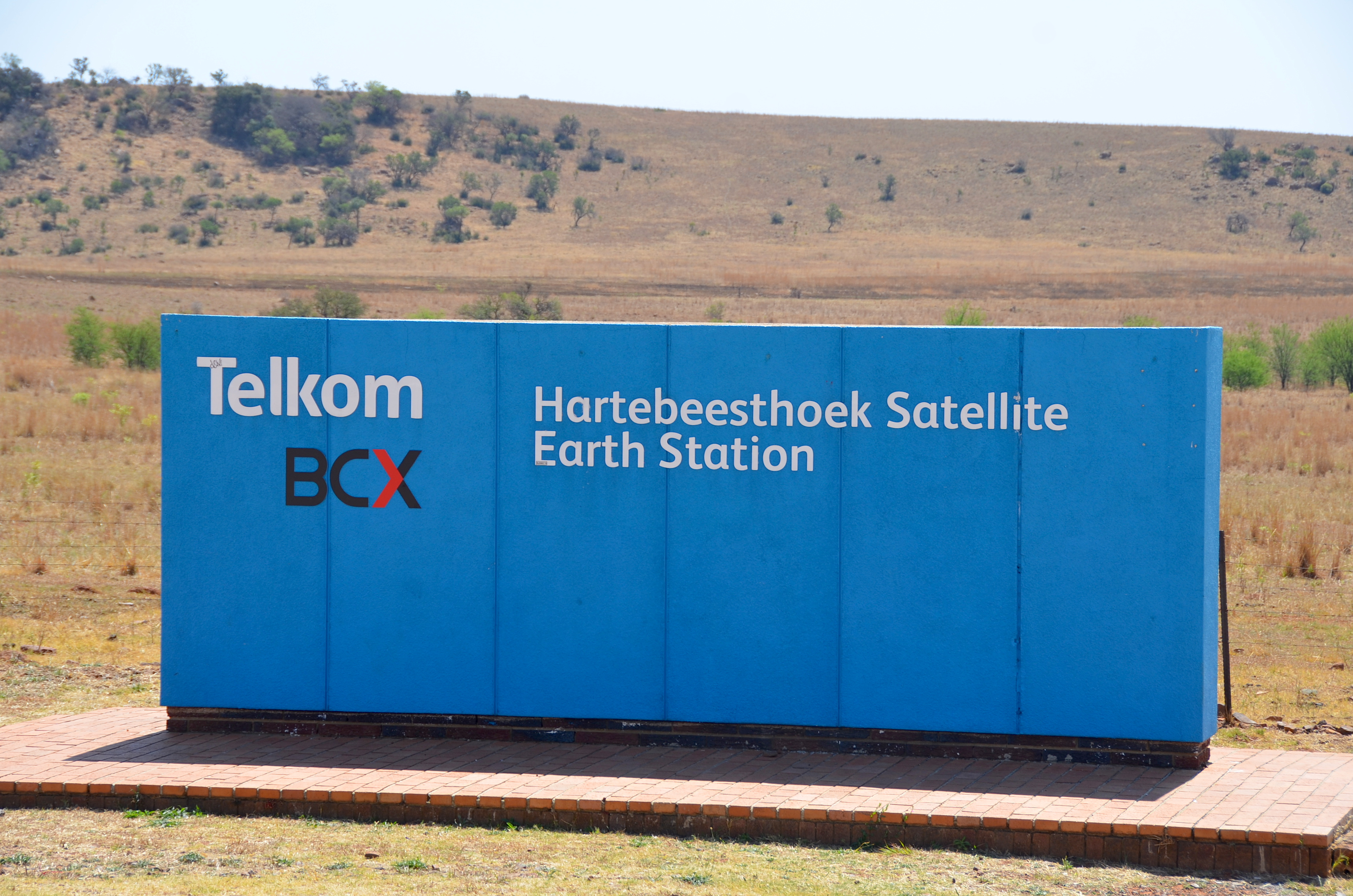
Entrance at Telkom (BCX) Hartebeesthoek Satellite Earth Station

Telkom operates in 38 countries in Africa, from regional hubs in Nigeria and Kenya via an integrated service provider strategy . It is expanding its service portfolio across managed voice, managed data, IT services & applications, and diversifying into new revenue growth opportunities in adjacent markets.

Recent acquisitions of Kenyan ISP Africa Online, and Nigerian mobile operator Multi-Links gives Telkom strategic hubs to expand data and voice services into Africa. Africa Online (AFOL) is a Pan African ISP operating in eight countries with the 9th country through a joint-venture with Verizon South Africa.

Multi-Links is a private telecommunications operator (as of 2009 a wholly owned Telkom subsidiary) with a Unified Access License allowing fixed, mobile, data, long-distance and international telecommunications services focused primarily on corporate clients in Nigeria.

Via Africa Online, Telkom intends leveraging its international capacity to deploy satellite based Internet access. Through Multi-Links, Telkom is introducing converged fixed and mobile services to the Nigerian market.

== Ownership ==
Until 2024, Telkom was majority state-owned, with the Government of South Africa as its largest shareholder. However, the government now owns less than 50% of the company's shares.

As of 2024, Telkom's major (beneficial) shareholders were:

- The Government of South Africa (40.52%)
- The South African Government Employees Pension Fund (15.89%)
- PSG Financial Services (3.97%)
- Telkom Treasury Stock (4.72%)
- M&G Investments (2.99%)
- Old Mutual (2.58%)

Total shareholding by the above South African entities amounts to 70.67%.

Major foreign custodians as of 2024 were:

- Citibank (4.69%)
- State Street Bank & Trust Co (2.42%)

Total shareholding by the above foreign entities amounts to 7.11%.

== Criticisms ==
=== Monopoly and state ownership ===
High cost of Internet access is a major point of consumer frustration in South Africa. Telkom's monopoly, backed by government investment, over fixed line provision and international access is often pointed out as the primary reason for the high costs of telecommunications.

The continuing monopoly of Telkom in South Africa's communications industry, and government's large stake in the company, have been perceived by the public, consumers, and the private sector as not being in the public's best interests. The South African telecommunications regulator ICASA is overburdened and restricted in its capabilities as handed down by the Department of Communications.

Telkom has a monopoly of all international calls originating within South Africa, excluding VoIP, and of traffic over the SAT3 cable that provides most of South Africa's international bandwidth. The indecision over the second network operator Neotel, to Telkom's advantage, is also not considered to be in the public interest.

Telkom has also attracted attention for improperly conducting itself in a contract dispute with Telcordia on account of non-delivery of an integrated FlowThru solution, resulting in a decision from the Supreme Court of Appeal against its favor in which the judge described Telkom's legal team as conducting "verbal manipulation".

On 19 January 2007, a full-page advertisement was taken out in The Mail and Guardian, a national South African newspaper. Money for the ad was donated by dissatisfied South African individuals and businesses. The page was used as a public outcry, detailing some of the things Telkom has done, in hopes of bringing more attention to the current situation in South Africa's telecoms industry. The effort was organised by the Telecoms Action Group, TAG.

=== ADSL capping ===
Perhaps one of the biggest criticisms of Telkom was its introduction of a monthly traffic limit or "cap". According to Telkom, this was a measure instituted in order for the South African network not to become "congested" with an overflow of information. However, the general feeling in the South African ADSL community is that monthly traffic limits were strategically put in place by Telkom in order to obtain the maximum amount of money from ADSL users.

This is mainly because Telkom offers extra bandwidth to users for a price. If the limit is exceeded during the course of the month, the ADSL connection is capped, denying international access to the web, while allowing access to local websites, until the end of the month. The user can purchase extra GBs after he/she is capped however. The typical monthly traffic limits can be used up in less than a day, even on low-speed lines.

=== Shaping ===
Another major criticism of Telkom was its institution of port prioritization or "shaping". This also was a measure introduced by Telkom in order for networks throughout South Africa not to become congested with too much information. However, port prioritization was an idea conceived mainly to benefit businesses in which employees all shared the same internet connection.

Employees who used "bandwidth hogging" applications such as peer-to-peer (P2P) applications and network-intense online games often slowed down the network dramatically, preventing users who wished to browse web pages or check their mail to do so in a short space of time. Port prioritization solves this problem as it prioritizes certain ports for certain applications. It works according to a protocol which includes all ports and applications generally used in conjunction with them.

These ports are sorted into a list of sorts. At the top of the list appear web browsing and email. These ports and the applications which use them receive the most bandwidth from the network. At the very bottom of the list are peer to peer applications, online games and virtual private networking (VPN). These receive little if not no bandwidth from the network.

Being unable to establish international VPN connections on the standard package has a detrimental effect on international freelancers who must pay for the much more expensive 'unshaped' service. Although it is the ideal solution for large companies, there is no choice in the shaping matter. Personal connections to the internet also get shaped. This has caused an uproar in the South African P2P and online gaming community as one has to pay over exorbitant prices (roughly two times more) to get their connections "unshaped."

=== Fine ===
In June 2013, Telkom accepted a R200 million fine to settle complaints that it used its dominant market position to block competition from other network providers.

== See also ==
- Telecommunications in South Africa
- Internet in South Africa
- Protea (telephone) – former South African telephone jack and plug standard
- SAIX (The South African Internet Exchange)
- South African Telephone Numbering Plan
- South African Communication Landmarks
