= Cell C =

South African mobile operator

Cell C Limited
- Type: Private
- Industry: Telecoms
- Founded: November 2001; 24 years ago
- Founders: Lehlohonolo Moloi
- Headquarters: Sandton, Gauteng, South Africa
- Area served: South Africa
- Key people: Jorge Mendes (CEO)
- Services: Cellular networking Fibre networking
- Revenue: ▲ R12.64 billion (2026)
- Operating income: ▲ R4.8 billion (2026)
- Net income: ▲ R4.16 billion (2026)
- Total assets: ▲ R10.24 billion (2026)
- Total equity: ▲ R3.35 billion (2026)
- Parent: Blu Label Unlimited (49.53%)
- Website: cellc.co.za

Cell C, officially Cell C Limited, is a South African mobile telecoms operator headquartered in Sandton, Gauteng. As of 2026, it ranks as the fourth-largest mobile provider in the country by customer base, with approximately 8.8 million subscribers.

The company offers services including voice, SMS, data, and fibre-based home internet. Cell C also serves as a MVNO host, partnering with brands like FNB Connect and Capitec Connect.

== History ==
Cell C was founded in 2001 by Lehlohonolo Moloi, entering the South African mobile telephony market as a challenger to major service providers Vodacom and MTN.

Starting in 2020, Cell C began transitioning away from owning and operating its own radio-access network (RAN). It migrated its prepaid and MVNO customers to MTN’s infrastructure, and postpaid and broadband subscribers to Vodacom, establishing roaming partnerships that give it access to around 28,000 towers, including more than 12,000 LTE-enabled sites.

This asset-light model has allowed it to significantly reduce capital expenditure from the billions typically required to build networks to under R 1 billion per year, while boosting cash flow and agility.

The company had been technically insolvent in 2022, and suffered a R337 million loss in the six months prior to November 2023.

The network migration finished in June 2023, several months earlier than the originally planned November 2023. Independent assessments confirm Cell C now provides coverage wherever MTN and Vodacom signal is available.

On 15 August 2024, Cell C unveiled a refreshed brand identity, including a new logo, audio mnemonic, and slogan. CEO Jorge Mendes, who joined in mid-2023, emphasised that the rebrand was part of a broader turnaround strategy to rejuvenate culture and market presence.

In February 2025, analysts noted an improved customer experience, and Cell C signal being available wherever MTN and Vodacom have coverage.

In July 2025, Cell C's largest shareholder, Blue Label Telecoms, acknowledged that the asset-light approach, piggybacking on Vodacom and MTN networks, was driving a successful turnaround.

== Operations ==
As of 2026, Cell C is South Africa's fourth-largest mobile service provider by customer base. That year, the company reported having a total of 8.8 million subscribers.

== Sponsorships ==
Cell C supports sports and entertainment initiatives, including via sponsoring the SA Rugby Legends, Wheel of Fortune, and Comrades Marathon.
