= List of broadband providers in South Africa =

The following is a list of broadband providers in South Africa.

== Mobile ==
- MTN Group
- Vodacom
- Telkom Mobile
- Cell C
- Rain

=== Mobile Virtual Network Operator ===
- Afrihost Air Mobile
- Axxess Mobile
- Capitec Connect
- FNB Connect
- Hello Mobile
- Me&You Mobile
- megsApp
- Melon Mobile
- Mr. Price Mobile
- PnP Mobile
- Shoprite K'nect Mobile
- Spar Mobile
- Standard Bank Connect
- TFG Connect
- Trace Mobile

==== Defunct ====
- Virgin Mobile South Africa

== Licensed service providers ==
=== Large ===
- Openserve
- Vumatel
- Frogfoot Networks
- Herotel
- Metro Fibre

=== Other ===
- Clear Access
- Evotel
- Fibre Geeks
- Lightstruck
- Link Africa
- Link Layer
- Mitsol
- Octotel
- Teralink
- Vodacom
- Zoom Fibre
- SADV
- Vukela

== Internet Service Providers ==
=== Backbone ===
- Liquid Telecommunications
- Openserve
- Seacom
- Tenet

=== Large ===
- Afrihost
- Business Connexion
- CMC Network
- Cool Ideas
- Cybersmart
- eNetworks
- Enterprise Outsourcing Operations
- FirstNet Technology Services
- ICTGlobe Management
- Internet Solutions
- MTN Business
- MWEB
- Rain (telecommunications)
- RSAWEB
- STEM Connect
- Supersonic
- Vox Telecom
- Webafrica
- Workonline Communications

=== Others ===
- ABT Telecoms
- Abutron
- Altron Nexus
- Altron Systems Integration
- BCS-Net
- BitCo Telecoms
- BRILLIANTEL
- Catalytic
- CipherWave Business Solutions
- CloudAfrica
- COMPUSOL IT TECHNOLOGIES
- Comsol Networks
- Comtel Communications
- Easyweb Internet
- Faircom
- Fixed Mobile Telecoms
- Frogfoot Networks
- Herotel
- Home-Connect
- HOSTAFRICA
- Huge Networks
- MBV IT
- Mytelnet
- Paratus
- Reflex Solutions
- SITA
- SURF4LIFE
- Switch Telecom
- Syrex
- Telviva
- WIRUlink
- ZACR
- 28East (Pty) Ltd
- Active Fibre
- Adept ICT
- AdNotes
- Aerocom Broadband
- Agile Solutions Provider
- AHB GROUP SERVICES PTY LTD
- Airpark Beaufort West
- Albany Schools Network
- Alesco Internet Solutions
- ALICOM (PTY) LTD
- AllWorldIT
- Amobia Communications
- ARM.it
- ASAP Internet
- ATEC Systems and Technologies
- Atomic Access
- Axxess DSL
- BACKSPACE TECHNOLOGIES (PTY) LTD
- Bandwidth Barn
- BestInternet
- betaNetworks
- Block Innovation
- Bunny Digital
- Business Services
- Buzzdotnet
- C-Way Computers
- Calmex
- Cape Connect Internet (Pty) Ltd
- Carrier Select
- Clear Access (Pty) Ltd
- Cloudseed (Pty) Ltd
- CM Value Added Services
- Computer and Satellite Electronics (CSE Pty Ltd)
- ComX Networks
- Conekt Business Group
- Converged Telecoms
- CUBE ICT Solutions (Pty) Ltd
- Dark Fibre Africa (DFA)
- Dash Host (Pty) Ltd
- DEVTEL
- Digital Parks Africa
- Digital Zoo
- Domain Name Service (Pty) Ltd
- Domains.co.za
- Dube Tradeport
- Edge Connect (pty) Ltd
- Elitehost - Optify Systems (Pty) Ltd
- Emalangeni Technologies
- Enyuka Internet Access
- Equation Business Solutions
- FFG Connection
- Fibre To The Apartment (PTY) LTD
- First in Business Solutions
- FREDD
- Geek Managed Services
- Genband Africa (Pty) Ltd
- GrandWell Technology
- Green Flash Trading 72 TA Megs
- Hostking
- HYPA
- IBITS Internet
- Iclix (PTY) Ltd
- iConnect Telecoms
- Imaginet
- INFINITY CONNECT
- Infogro
- InfoStream Technologies
- Intdev Internet Technologies
- Intellihost (Pty) Ltd
- Interexcel
- Internext
- iOCO Infrastructure Services
- ION Consulting
- iONLINE
- ISP Solutions
- IvyWeb
- Ladysmith Wireless Solutions
- LanDynamix
- Mobility Online
- MyBroadband Online
- NetConnect
- Network & Computing Consultants
- NOM.ZA
- OpenWeb
- PacketSky
- PC Maniacs
- Platformity
- Rapid Networks
- Redwill ICT
- River BroadBand
- RocketNet
- Saicom Voice Services
- SimSciex Technologies
- ite Essence
- Sonke Telecommunications
- Sybaweb
- synch.cc
- Tech 5
- Techseeds Group
- Vanilla
- Velocity Trade Financial Services
- Veritech Communication
- Verizon
- Web Squad Connect
- Web4Africa
- Wibernet
- Xtranet Internet Services
- ZSD

=== Provisional members ===
These members are in the process of joining the ISP association:

- Airfibre Solutions
- Calmex
- Emalangeni Technologies
- Marta Group
- Somangaye Internet Technologies
- Vo Connect
- Vodacom
- Wibernet
- Wiiconnect
- ZANOG

== Satellite ==
- Twoobii
- Vox (South Africa)
- Vodacom
- Paratus South Africa

== See also ==
- Internet in South Africa
