= Internet in Africa =

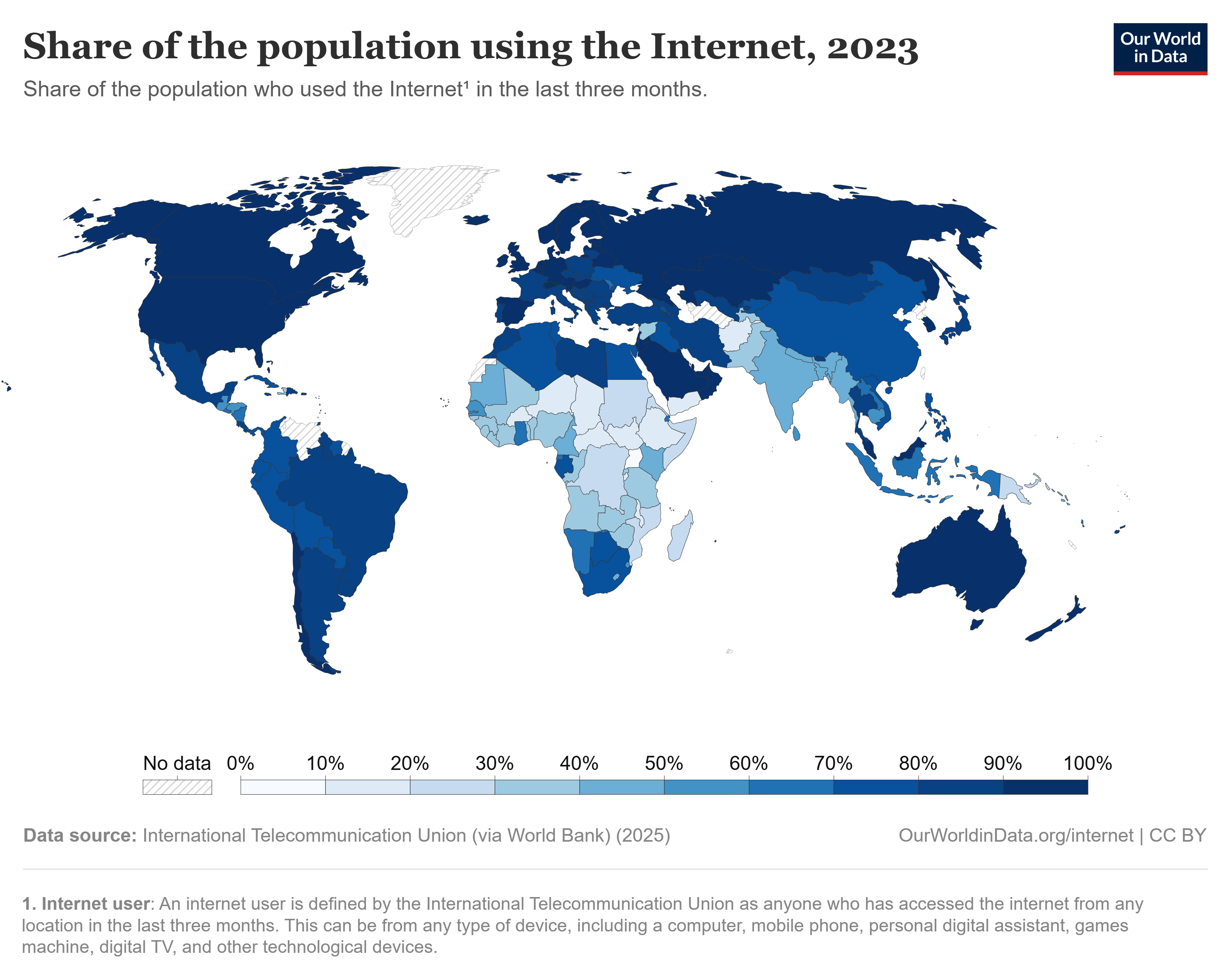
Percentage of population using the Internet in 2022. Note that Africa has significantly less internet usage.

The Internet in Africa is limited by a lower penetration rate when compared to the rest of the world. Measurable parameters such as the number of Internet service providers (ISPs) subscriptions, overall number of hosts, IXP-traffic, and overall available bandwidth are indicators that Africa is far behind the "digital divide". Moreover, Africa itself exhibits an inner digital divide, with most Internet activity and infrastructure concentrated in South Africa, Morocco, and Egypt, as well as smaller economies like Mauritius and the Seychelles. In general, only 38% of the African population has access to the Internet as of 2025. Only 0.4% of the African population has a fixed-broadband subscription. The majority of internet users use it through mobile broadband.

During the COVID-19 pandemic, many people who were not connected to the internet lost access to health care and education. Production in all industries was seriously harmed.

While the telecommunications market in Africa is still in its early stages of development, it is also one of the fastest-growing in the world. In the 2000s, mobile telephone service in Africa has been rising, and mobile telephone use is now substantially more widespread than fixed-line telephony. Telecommunication companies in Africa are looking at Broadband Wireless Access technologies as the key to make Internet available to the population at large. Projects are being completed that aim at the realization of Internet backbones that might help cut the cost of bandwidth in African countries.

The International Telecommunication Union held the first Connect the World meeting in Kigali, Rwanda (in October 2007) as a demonstration that the development of telecommunications in Africa is considered a key intermediate objective for the fulfillment of the Millennium Development Goals.

== Internet penetration in Africa, by country ==
=== Previous situation ===
A map of the percentage of the population of African countries using the Internet in 2015 (see table for 2000 and 2015 data by individual country).

The information available about the ability of people in Africa to use the internet (for instance ISP subscriptions, host number, network traffic, available bandwidth and bandwidth cost) give an essentially homogeneous picture. South Africa is the only African country that has figures similar to those of Europe and North America: it is followed by some smaller, tourist-dependent economies, such as Seychelles and Mauritius, and a few North African countries, notably Morocco and Egypt. The leading Subsaharan countries in telecommunication sand internet development are South Africa and Kenya.

Nation	Population in thousands	Individuals using the internet in 2000 (%)	Individuals using the internet in 2015 (%)	Individuals using the internet in 2022 (%)
Algeria	39670	0.49	38.20	71.2
Angola	25326	0.11	12.40	39.3
Benin	10782	0.23	6.79	33.8
Botswana	2176	2.90	27.50	77.3
Burkina Faso	18450	2.90	27.50	19.9
Burundi	9824	0.08	4.87	11.3
Cameroon	21918	0.25	20.68	43.9
Cape Verde	525	1.82	43.02	72.1
Central African; Republic	4900	0.05	4.56	10.6
Chad	13675	0.04	2.70	12.2
Congo	3903	0.03	7.62	36.2
DR Congo	77267	0.01	3.80	27.2
Ivory Coast	23126	0.23	21.00	38.4
Djibouti	961	0.19	11.92	65
Egypt	89125	0.64	37.82	72.2
Equatorial Guinea	1996	0.13	21.32	66.8
Eritrea	6895	0.14	1.08	26.6
Eswatini	1119	0.93	30.38	58.3
Ethiopia	99391	0.02	11.60	19.4
Gabon	1873	1.22	23.50	73.7
Gambia	2022	0.92	17.12	54.2
Ghana	27414	0.15	23.48	69.8
Guinea	10935	0.10	4.70	33.9
Guinea Bissau	1788	0.23	3.54	31.6
Kenya	45533	0.32	45.62	40.8
Lesotho	1908	0.21	16.07	47
Liberia	4046	0.02	5.90	30.1
Libya	6278	0.19	19.02	88.4
Madagascar	23043	0.20	4.17	20.6
Malawi	16307	0.13	9.30	18
Mali	17796	0.14	10.30	33.1
Mauritania	3632	0.19	15.20	44.4
Mauritius	1263	7.28	50.14	75.5
Morocco	34380	0.69	57.08	89.9
Mozambique	28013	0.11	9.00	21.2
Namibia	2281	1.64	22.31	62.2
Niger	18880	0.04	2.22	16.9
Nigeria	181563	0.06	47.44	35.5
Rwanda	11324	0.06	18.00	34.4
São Tomé and Príncipe	206	4.64	25.82	57
Senegal	14150	0.40	21.69	60
Sierra Leone	6513	0.12	5.36	30.4
Somalia	10972	0.02	55.76	27.6
South Africa	54957	5.35	51.92	74.7
Sudan	40235 / 12519	0.03	26.61	28.6
Tanzania	51046	0.12	5.36	31.9
Togo	7065	0.80	7.12	37.6
Tunisia	11118	2.75	48.52	73.8
Uganda	37102	0.16	19.22	10
Zambia	15474	0.19	21.00	31.2
Zimbabwe	13503	0.40	16.36	32.6

=== Current trend ===
As of December 2020, Kenya had an internet penetration of approximately 85.2. This high rate is mainly because Kenya is home to M-Pesa, which is a mobile wallet provider and the offered secure payment system encourages internet access. As of October 2020, the majority of web traffic in leading digital markets in Africa originated from mobile devices in Nigeria, one of the countries with the biggest number of internet users worldwide. Across the nation, 74 percent of web traffic was generated via smartphones and only 24 percent via PC devices. This is connected to the fact that mobile connections are much cheaper and do not require the infrastructure that is needed for traditional desktop PCs with fixed-line internet connections.

=== Context ===
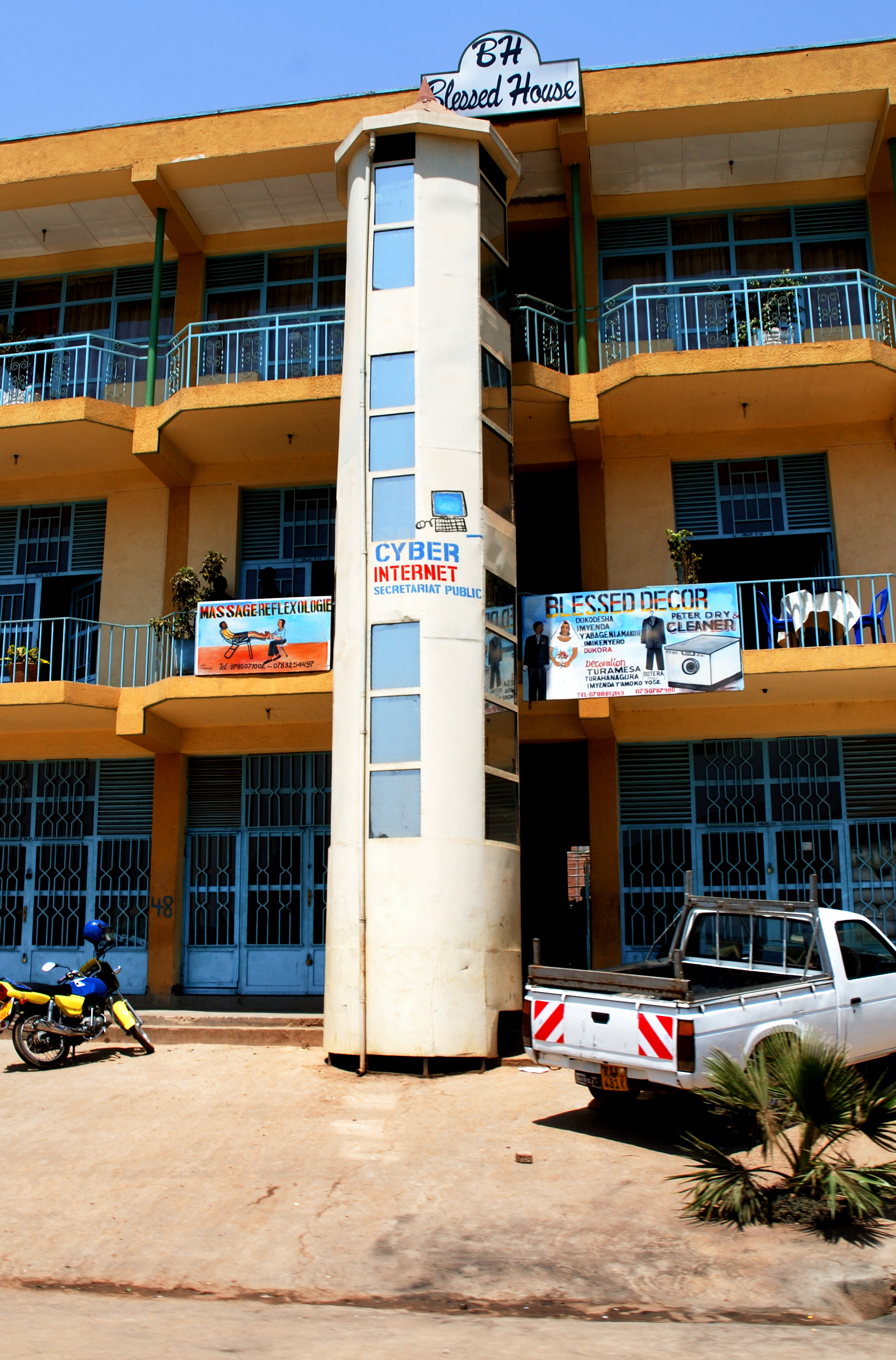
Internet access point in Kigali, Rwanda

Obstacles to the accessibility of Internet services in Africa include generally low levels of computer literacy in the population, poor infrastructures, and high costs of Internet services. Power availability is also scarce, with vast rural areas that are not connected to power grids as well as frequent black-outs in major urban areas such as Dar es Salaam.

In 2000, Subsaharan Africa as a whole had fewer fixed telephone lines than Manhattan, and in 2006, Africa contributed to only 2% of the world's overall telephone lines in the world. As a consequence of this general lack of connectivity, most Africa-generated network traffic (something between 70% and 85%) is routed through servers that are located elsewhere (mainly Europe).

Overall bandwidth in Africa is scarce, and its irregular distribution clearly reflects the African "inner digital divide". In 2007, 16 countries in Africa had just one international Internet connection with a capacity of 10 Mbit/s or lower, while South Africa alone had over 800 Mbit/s. The main backbones connecting Africa to the rest of the world via submarine cables, i.e., SAT-2 and SAT-3, provide for a limited bandwidth. In 2007, all these international connections from Africa amounted to roughly 28,000 Mbit/s, while Asia had 800,000 Mbit/s and Europe had over 3,000,000 Mbit/s. The total bandwidth available to Africa was less than that available to Norway alone (49,000 Mbit/s).

As a consequence of the scarce overall bandwidth provided by cable connections, a large section of Internet traffic in Africa goes through expensive satellite links. In general, thus, the cost of Internet access (and even more so broadband access) is unaffordable for most of the population. According to the Kenyan ISPs association, high costs are also a consequence of the subjection of African ISPs to European ISPs and the lack of a clear international regulation of inter-ISP cost partition. For example, while ITU has long ratified that the cost of inter-provider telephonic connections must be charged to all involved providers in equal parts, in 2002, the Kenyan ISP association has denounced that all costs of Internet traffic between Europe and Africa are charged to African providers.

=== Internet access ===
Internet users by region
Region	2005	2010	2017	2023
Africa	2%	10%	21.8%	37%
Americas	36%	49%	65.9%	87%
Arab States	8%	26%	43.7%	69%
Asia and Pacific	9%	23%	43.9%	66%
Commonwealth of Independent States	10%	34%	67.7%	89%
Europe	46%	67%	79.6%	91%

According to 2011 estimates, about 13.5% of the African population has Internet access. While Africa accounts for 15.0% of the world's population, only 6.2% of the World's Internet subscribers are Africans. Africans who have access to broadband connections are estimated to be in percentage of 1% or lower. In September 2007, African broadband subscribers were 1,097,200, with a major part of these subscriptions from large companies or institutions.

Internet access is also irregularly distributed, with 2/3 of overall online activity in Africa being generated in South Africa (which only accounts for 5% of the continent's population). Most of the remaining 1/3 is in Morocco and Egypt. The largest percentage of Internet subscribers are found in small economies such as Seychelles, where as much as 37% of the population has Internet access (while in South Africa this value is 11% and in Egypt it is 8%).

It has been noted, anyway, that data on Internet subscribers only partially reflect the actual number of Internet users in Africa, and the impact of the network on African daily life and culture. For example, cybercafes and Internet kiosks are common in the urban areas of many African countries. There are also other informal means to "access" the Internet; for example, couriers that print e-mail messages and deliver them by hand to recipients in remote locations, or radio stations that broadcast information taken from the Internet.

=== Number of hosts ===
The picture provided by the figures for the number of network hosts is coherent with those above. At the end of 2007:

- about 1.8 million hosts were in Africa, versus over 120 million in Europe, 67 million in Asia and 27 million in South America;
- Africa as a whole had fewer hosts than Finland alone;
- relatively developed Nigeria, despite its 155 million inhabitants, had one third of the hosts found in Liechtenstein with its 35,000 inhabitants; and
- the largest number of African hosts (almost 90%) were in just three countries, South Africa, Morocco, and Egypt.

The table below lists the number of hosts for African countries with more than 1000 hosts in 2007 and 2013. These countries collectively account for 99% of Africa's overall hosts. The last column for each year provides the "host density" measured as the number of hosts per 1000 inhabitants; for comparison, consider that the average host density in the world was 43 hosts per 1000 inhabitants in 2007 and 72 hosts per 1000 inhabitants in 2013.

	June 2013			December 2007		
Nation	Hosts (×1000)	Percentage (of Africa's total)	Hosts (per 1000 inhabitants)	Hosts (×1000)	Percentage (of Africa's total)	Hosts (per 1000 inhabitants)
South Africa	4835	80	96	1197	65	25
Morocco	279	5	9	273	15	9
Egypt	204	3	4	175	10	2
Mozambique	92	2	4	23	1	1
Libya	79	1	12	—	—	—
Namibia	78	1	37	7	0	3
Kenya	73	1	2	24	1	1
Ghana	60	1	2	24	1	1
Mauritius	51	1	42	10	1	8
Zimbabwe	47	1	4	18	1	2
Madagascar	43	1	21	11	1	1
Angola	37	1	2	6	0	0
Uganda	33	1	1	1	0	0
Réunion	33	1	39	—	—	—
Tanzania	27	0	1	21	1	1
Côte d'Ivoire	25	0	1	6	0	0
Zambia	17	0	1	8	0	1
Lesotho	11	0	5	—	—	—
Cameroon	10	0	1	—	—	—
Botswana	8	0	4	6	0	4
Rwanda	4	0	0	2	0	0
Malawi	3	0	0	—	—	—
Congo, DR	3	0	0	2	0	0
Swaziland	3	0	2	3	0	2
Congo, RO	3	0	1	—	—	—
Nigeria	2	0	0	2	0	0
Burkina Faso	2	0	0	—	—	—
Gambia	2	0	1	—	—	—
São Tomé and Príncipe	2	0	10	1	0	8
Eritrea	1	0	0	1	0	0
Sierra Leone	1	0	0	—	—	—
Benin	1	0	0	—	—	—
Togo	1	0	0	—	—	—
Africa (total)	6027	100	6	1830	100	2

=== IXP traffic ===
An indirect measure that is sometimes used to assess the penetration of Internet technology in a given area is the overall amount of data traffic at Internet exchange points (IXPs). On African IXPs, traffic can be measured in kbit/s (kilobits per second) or Mbit/s (megabits per second), while in the rest of the world it is typically in the order of magnitude of Gbit/s (gigabits per second). The main IXP of Johannesburg, JINX (which is also the largest IXP in Africa) has about 6.5 Gbit/s traffic (in Sep 2012).

IXP traffic, anyway, is only a measure of local network traffic (mainly e-mail), while most of African generated traffic is routed through other continents, and most Web content created in Africa is hosted on Web servers located elsewhere. Additionally, measurable data do not consider private peering, i.e., inter-ISP traffic that does not go through IXPs. For example, the main academic network in South Africa, TENET, has 10 Gbit/s private peering with ISP Internet Solutions both in Johannesburg and Cape Town.

=== Regulation ===
The privatization of the telecommunication market, as well as the regulation of the competition in this market, are in an early stage of development in many Africa countries. Kenya and Botswana have started a privatization process for Telkom Kenya and Botswana Telecommunications Corporation (BTC), respectively. The mobile telephony market is generally more open and dynamic, and even more so is the Internet market.

The table below depicts the percentage of African countries where telecommunications markets (fixed line telephony, mobile telephony, Internet) are monopolistic, partially competitive, or fully competitive, either de iure or de facto (data refer to 2007).

	Internet	Mobile telephones	Fixed telephones
Monopolistic	10%	9%	55%
Partially competitive	12%	41%	23%
Fully competitive	69%	43%	25%

The regulation of network businesses and the establishment of authorities to control them is widely recognised as a relevant objective by most African governments. A model for such regulation is provided by Morocco; after an authority was established in 1998, and Meditel entered the market in 1999 to compete with the main incumbent Maroc Telecom, the situation has been quickly developing. Based on such experiences and on the directions provided by ITU, most African countries now have local Internet authorities and are defining local regulation of the Internet market. In 2007, 83% of African countries had their own authority for Internet services and data traffic.

== Benefits of Internet Access in Africa ==
It is widely recognized that increased availability of Internet technology in Africa would provide several key benefits. Specifically, some of the major issues of the continent might be tackled by applications of this technology, as demonstrated by some initiatives that have already been started and that proved successful. For example, organizations such as RANET (RAdio and interNET for The communication of Hydro-Meteorological and Climate-Related Information) and the ACMAD (African Centre of Meteorological Application for Development) use Internet to develop reliable weather models for Sahel and other areas in Africa, with dramatic benefits for local agricultures.

Internet-based telemedicine and distance education could improve quality of life in the most remote rural areas of Africa. The availability of information on the network could benefit education in general, counterbalancing the general lack of local libraries. It has also been suggested that e-Government applications could indirectly alleviate widespread political issues such as they would definitely help bridge the gap between the institutions and remote rural areas. Most Web 2.0 applications developed in Africa insofar have actually been created by governments.

African economy might also benefit from broadband availability, for example as a consequence of the applicability of e-commerce and outsourcing business models that have long proved effective in Europe and North America. Currently there are many small businesses (Cybercafes, local ISPs or Wireless ISPs) that benefit from broadband availability via satellite to provide Internet connectivity solutions to local customers.

One technology that has been utilized in many African countries for the provision of Internet broadband connectivity is VSAT, which allows businesses to access the European or US Internet backbone via satellite in regions that lack terrestrial Internet access. Fiber in Africa has been restricted to big coastal cities facing North Atlantic, South Atlantic, and Indian Oceans. According to World Bank data only 37% of Africa's 1.2 billion people actually live in those regions. Therefore, satellite remains to be the most effective and viable way to reach rural areas, and thus a major portion of Africa's population. Satellite access in Africa is popular on KU band and C band, with C band being the preferred access method in countries that have heavy rainfall.

== Evolution and perspectives ==
=== Internet availability ===
The African telecommunication market is growing at a faster rate than in the rest of the world. In the 2000s this has especially been true for the mobile telephony market, that between 2004 and 2007 grew three times as fast as the world's average. In 2005, over 5 billion USD have been invested in Africa in telecommunication infrastructures.

Internet in Africa is now growing even faster than mobile telephony. Between 2000 and 2008, Internet subscriptions have grown by 1030.2%, versus the world's average of 290.6%.

The table below summarizes figures for the number of Internet subscription in Africa from 2000 to 2008, based on estimates made in 2008.

Nation	Population (×1000)	Subscriptions in 2000 (×1000)	Subscriptions in 2008 (×1000)	Growth 2000–2008 (%)	Internet users (%)
Algeria	33770	50	3500	69	10
Angola	12531	30	100	233	1
Benin	8295	15	150	900	2
Botswana	1842	15	80	433	4
Burkina Faso	15265	10	80	700	1
Burundi	8691	3	60	1900	1
Cameroon	18468	20	370	1750	2
Cape Verde	427	8	37	362	9
Central African; Republic	4435	1	13	767	1
Chad	10111	1	60	5900	1
Comoros	732	1	21	1300	3
Congo	3903	1	70	13900	2
DR Congo	66514	1	230	45980	1
Côte d'Ivoire	18373	40	300	650	2
Djibouti	506	1	11	685	2
Egypt	81713	450	8620	1815	10
Equatorial Guinea	616	1	8	1500	1
Eritrea	5028	5	120	2300	2
Ethiopia	78254	10	291	2810	1
Gabon	1486	15	81	440	5
Gambia	1735	4	100	2405	6
Ghana	23383	30	650	2066	3
Guinea	10211	8	50	525	1
Guinea Bissau	1503	1	37	2366	2
Kenya	37954	200	3000	1400	8
Lesotho	2128	4	70	1650	3
Liberia	3335	1	1	100	1
Libya	6174	10	260	2500	4
Madagascar	20043	30	110	266	1
Malawi	13932	15	139	830	1
Mali	12324	18	100	431	1
Mauritania	3365	5	30	500	1
Mauritius	1274	87	340	291	27
Morocco	34343	100	7300	7200	21
Mozambique	21285	30	200	566	1
Namibia	2089	30	100	233	5
Niger	13273	5	40	703	1
Nigeria	168803	200	10000	4900	7
Rwanda	10186	5	150	2900	1
São Tomé and Príncipe	206	6	23	253	11
Senegal	12853	40	820	1950	6
Seychelles	82	6	32	433	39
Sierra Leone	6295	5	13	160	1
Somalia	9559	1	98	48900	1
South Africa	43786	2400	5100	112	22
Sudan	40218	30	1500	4900	4
Swaziland	1128	10	42	320	4
Tanzania	40213	115	400	248	1
Togo	5859	100	320	220	5
Tunisia	10383	100	1722	1622	17
Uganda	31368	40	2000	4900	6
Zambia	11669	20	500	2400	4
Zimbabwe	12382	50	1351	2602	11
Africa (total)	985726	4514	51022	1030	5

=== Infrastructure development ===
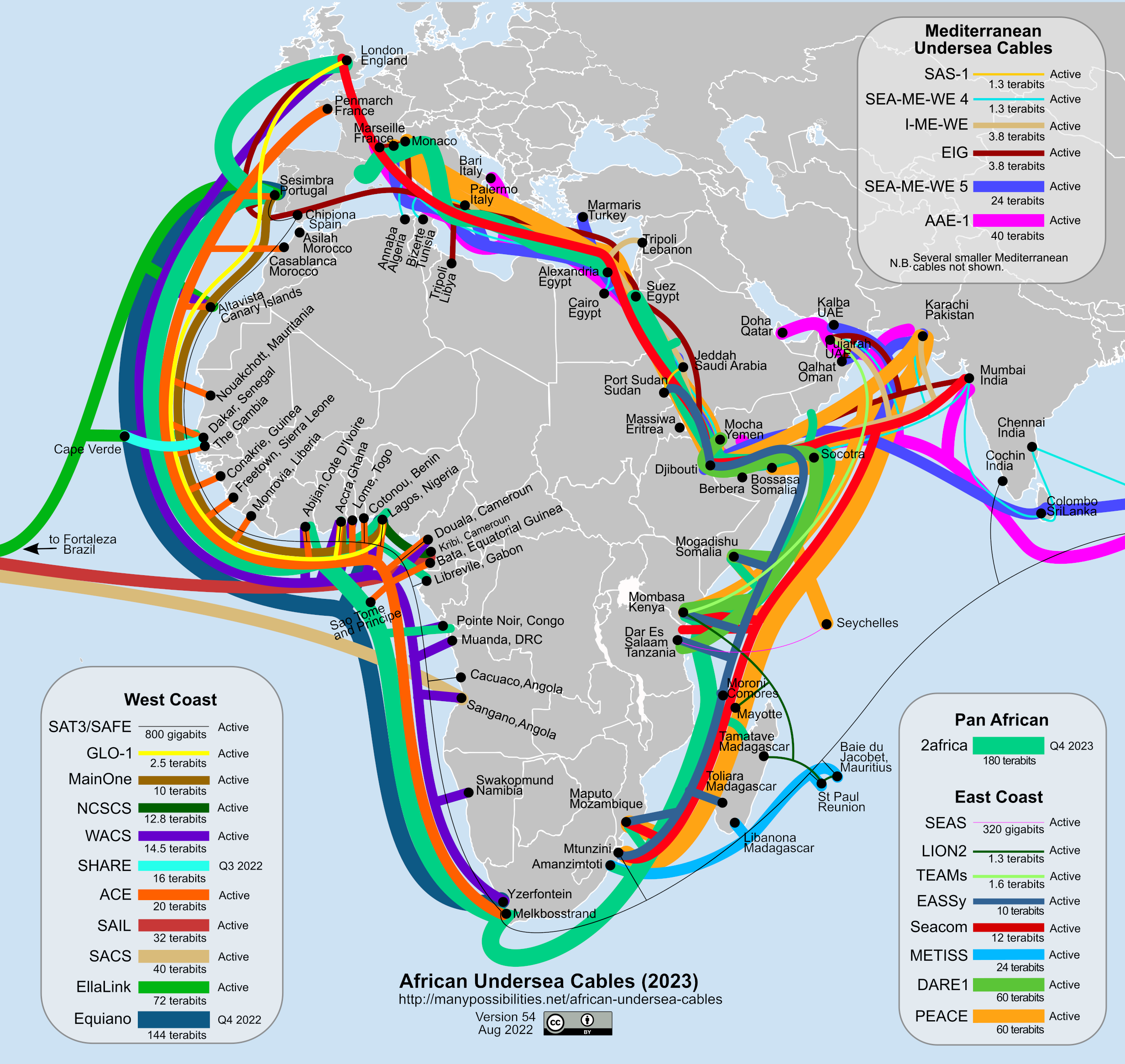
African undersea cables

A number of projects have been started that aim at bringing more bandwidth to Africa, in order to cut down costs for both operators and end users. At least three projects for an underseas backbone in the Indian Ocean have been started. EASSy (East African Submarine cable System), sponsored by the World Bank and the Development Bank of Southern Africa, is a cable system that will connect Mtunzini (South Africa) and Port Sudan (Sudan), with branches to several countries on the eastern coast of Africa. The Kenyan government has started a similar project named TEAMS (The East Africa Marine System), with the collaboration of Etisalat. A third project, SEACOM, is completely African-owned. SEACOM bandwidth has already been sold to several customers, including the South African network TENET. On the eastern coast of the continent of Africa, the Africa Coast to Europe cable connects Gibraltar to South Africa and lands in Gulf of Guinea nations, and allows for more access to connectivity. The Eastern African Submarine System, a 10,000 km cable network, is another example.

In South Africa, the SANReN network, with a 500 Gbit/s core, has been designed to become the fastest academic network in the world; the universities of Witwatersrand and Johannesburg are already using a bandwidth of 10 Gbit/s provided by this network.

According to the European Commission, a 10% rise in digital coverage could result in a more than 1% increase in African GDP. The European Investment Bank makes funding emerging developments on the continent a priority, in line with the EU's plan for African digital transformation. The European Investment Bank is providing a €25 million for a 600 km undersea cable in Mauritania, to provide digital access to more people.

=== Access ===
Efforts to connect previously disconnected parts of the world have been compared to previous rounds of infrastructure in Africa. The recent linking of East Africa to the global fibre-optic network generated similar visions and hopes to those that emerged in the Victorian era when railways were used to connect the previously disconnected.

With bandwidth becoming more available and less costly, the first to benefit will be institutions and companies that already have Internet access. In order for the network to reach a larger part of the population, solutions are needed for the last mile problem, i.e., to make bandwidth available to the final user. To be feasible for Africa, last mile solutions must be found that take into account the limited penetration of fixed telephony lines, especially in rural areas. Of about 400.000 rural communities that are estimated to exist in Africa, less than 3% have PSTN access. Note that providing network access to rural communities is one of Millennium Goals defined by the World Summit on the Information Society.

Most studies on this subject identify Broadband Wireless Access (BWA) technologies such as WiMAX as the most promising solution for the end user's Internet access in Africa. These technologies can also benefit from the wide availability of the mobile telephony network. Even in smaller countries like Seychelles, most Internet users already access the network via the GSM network. Providers that have 3G licenses will be able to provide WiMAX services.

Some experimentation is already being conducted in a few countries. In Kenya, the Digital Village Scheme project aims at providing government services in rural areas via wireless access. In Nigeria, Horizon Wireless is running a broadband (3.5 GHz) wireless network. Since 2007, MTN Rwanda has been working to provide broadband wireless access in Kigali. In Algeria, the Icosnet ISP and Aperto Networks have been collaborating for a business WiMAX solution. The South African authority ICASA has already assigned WiMAX licences to several providers, and Neotel is implementing WiMAX-based last mile solutions in Johannesburg, Pretoria, Cape Town and Durban.

Mobile technology is the primary infrastructure for telecom services in Africa, with operators focusing their efforts on it. In certain markets, mobile networks handle up to 99% of voice and data traffic. Fixed-line infrastructure is slower, more expensive, has a larger reach, and has fewer difficulties. The number of mobile customers in Africa is expanding faster than everywhere else. By rapidly linking entrepreneurs, startups, and enterprises with existing and future clientele, digital platforms are creating possibilities for them. Mobile financial services allow for immediate payment of products and services.

According to a survey conducted in 2022, the percentage of banks offering digital products or services ranges from at least 80% in Central Africa to more than 95% in West Africa (mostly driven by Nigeria). The top three most often requested services are domestic money transfers (87%), receiving payments from clients (85%), and paying bills or suppliers (79.6%).

In the 2020s, in an effort to bridge the digital divide, several African countries granted licenses to companies who offer satellite internet or other electronic communications offerings.

== See also ==
- AfriNIC (regional Internet registry for Africa)
- List of terrestrial fibre optic cable projects in Africa
- Digital divide
- Millennium Development Goals
- Mobile telephony in Africa
- Media of Africa
- Africa Digital Awards
- Project Kuiper
- Rural internet
- satellite internet
