= Gian Visser =

- Born: February 27, 1975 (age 50); Johannesburg, Gauteng, South Africa

Gian Visser (born 1975) is a South African entrepreneur and innovator in the internet services sector of South Africa. Visser is the current CEO and co-founder of Afrihost and has won several awards for his work in the telecommunications sector.

== Early life ==
Visser was born in Johannesburg, Gauteng on 27 February 1975. His parents were born and met in Carltonville, from mining families. His father was a police officer in the South African Police Service and his mother was a bookkeeper. He also has a younger sister.

Visser's family moved to Johannesburg, where he attended school at King Edward VII School (Johannesburg) in Houghton Estate, alongside his future business partners, Brendan Armstrong and Peter Meintjies.

Visser registered to study Actuarial Science at University of the Witwatersrand but later changed to complete a BCom. After completing his studies, he worked briefly as a maths teacher before deciding to devote his time to entrepreneurship.

== Business career ==
Visser began a number of small businesses while still studying. His first full-time business pursuit was in the IT sector, alongside his long time friend, Brendan Armstrong. They formed a company called VSphereNet (or VSN), which was later bought by a larger IT firm. Visser and Armstrong were appointed as Directors of the company, but later chose to leave to follow independent business ventures.

Visser and Armstrong, along with schoolfriend Peter Meintjies, formed Afrihost in September 2000. The company started in his mother's home (in his bedroom) and gradually began to grow to the point where the company's operations took over the entire house. The company eventually moved to rented premises in Rivonia, and finally to their permanent residence in Rivonia, where the company currently employs approximately 350 people. Visser was later joined by Greg Payne, former COO of Internet Solutions, and Angus McRobert, former CEO of Internet Solutions and Vox Telecom.

Visser was instrumental in launching the company's presence in broadband connectivity, which facilitated the company's rapid growth. He was also central to the company's sale of shares to MTN (South Africa) and their subsequent buy-back of the company's shares.

Visser is an avid reader, particularly of non-fiction books related to marketing and behavioural psychology. He often employs viral marketing methods learned from Seth Godin, Chip Heath, Dan Heath, Jonah Berger and Rohit Bhargava. He also cites Malcolm Gladwell and Tony Hsieh as being major influences in formulating the company's approach to customer service and the company culture. Visser is well known for his personal approach to customers, often sending emails to customers directly in favour of branded messaging, also being available on social media.

== Achievements ==
Visser has won the prestigious MyBroadband IT Personality of the Year Award three times, in 2013, 2014 and 2016. He was also awarded the IT Personality of the Year for 2014 by the IITPSA.

== See also ==
- Internet in South Africa
- MTN (South Africa)
