= Afrihost =

ISP in South Africa

Afrihost (PTY) Ltd
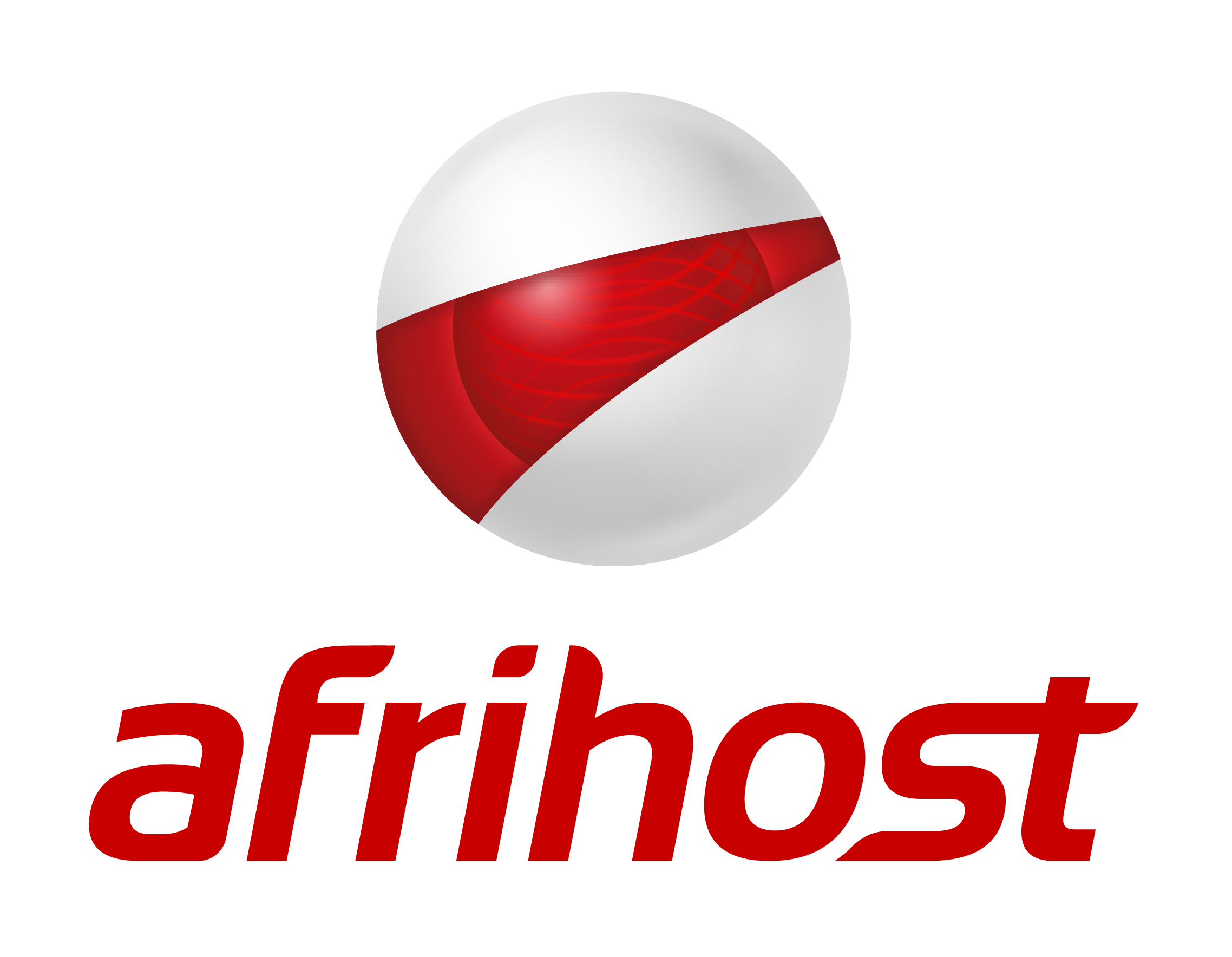
- Trade name: Afrihost
- Type: Private
- Industry: Telecommunication
- Founded: 2000; 26 years ago
- Headquarters: Johannesburg, South Africa,
- Area served: South Africa
- Key people: Gian Visser (CEO); Brendan Armstrong; Greg Payne; Angus McRobert; Dean Suchard; Peter Meintjes (Co-founder)
- Products: Fiber internet VoIP; Mobile services Web hosting
- Subsidiaries: Axxess
- Website: www.afrihost.com

Afrihost is a South African internet service provider (ISP), providing a number of services, including fiber internet, fixed wireless, mobile services, VoIP, and web hosting.

== History ==
The company was established in 2000 by CEO Gian Visser, Brendan Armstrong and Peter Meintjes, who were later joined by Greg Payne (the former COO of Internet Solutions).

The business was originally run from Visser's home, until it moved to offices in 2005.

Originally a web hosting and general IT services company, the firm joined the broadband market in 2009. The original executives have since been joined by Angus MacRobert, former CEO of Internet Solutions and joint CEO of Vox Telecom.

In 2011, Afrihost acquired Axxess, an ISP founded in 1997, which offers FTTH (Fibre) Internet services through most service providers, including OpenServe and Vumatel.

In 2014, MTN Group purchased 50.02% of Afrihost's shares for R408 million. However, in 2016, MTN Group sold its stake in Afrihost. The shares were sold back to Afrihost's directors for R325 million.

Dean Suchard, formerly CFO of Dimension Data, joined the board as Financial Director in 2016.

In mid-2021, it was announced that Afrihost would acquire a majority stake in competing South African ISP, Cool Ideas, after the deal was unconditionally approved by the country's Competition Commission. This will significantly increase Afrihost's share of the local internet subscriber market. Cool Ideas will continue operating as a stand-alone brand and business, including comprising the same management team and employees. All original shareholders of Cool Ideas, including founders Andre Jooste and Paul Butschi, will retain their stakes in the company.

== Services ==
In 2000, Afrihost offered web hosting services.

In 2018, it was a broadband and telecoms service provider as well, which offers ADSL, VDSL, broadband, fiber-to-the-home, mobile voice and mobile data services.

As of 2025, Afrihost offers fiber internet, fixed wireless, mobile services, VoIP, and web hosting, among other services, catering to the South African market.

== Accomplishments ==
In 2017, Afrihost won various industry awards for its Fibre and ADSL offerings, as well as for its customer care.

In 2025, Afrihost celebrated winning the MyBroadband ISP of the Year Award for the third consecutive year.

== Criticism ==
In 2015 and 2016, Afrihost faced criticism of a decline in service levels, and degraded performance of its broadband products. This was due to not provisioning enough capacity to properly serve the volume of clients it had.

== See also ==
- Internet in South Africa
