= Internet Service Providers Association =

Internet Service Providers Association may refer to:

- Internet Service Providers Association Bangladesh (ISPAB)
- Internet Service Providers Association (South Africa)
- Internet Service Providers Association (United Kingdom)
- Wireless & Internet Service Providers Association of Pakistan (WISPAP)
- Internet Service Providers Association of Ireland

== See also ==
- ISPA (disambiguation)
- Indonesia Internet Exchange
- Tanzania Internet eXchange
- Johannesburg Internet Exchange
- DNS Belgium
