= Frogfoot Networks =

South African fiber network operator

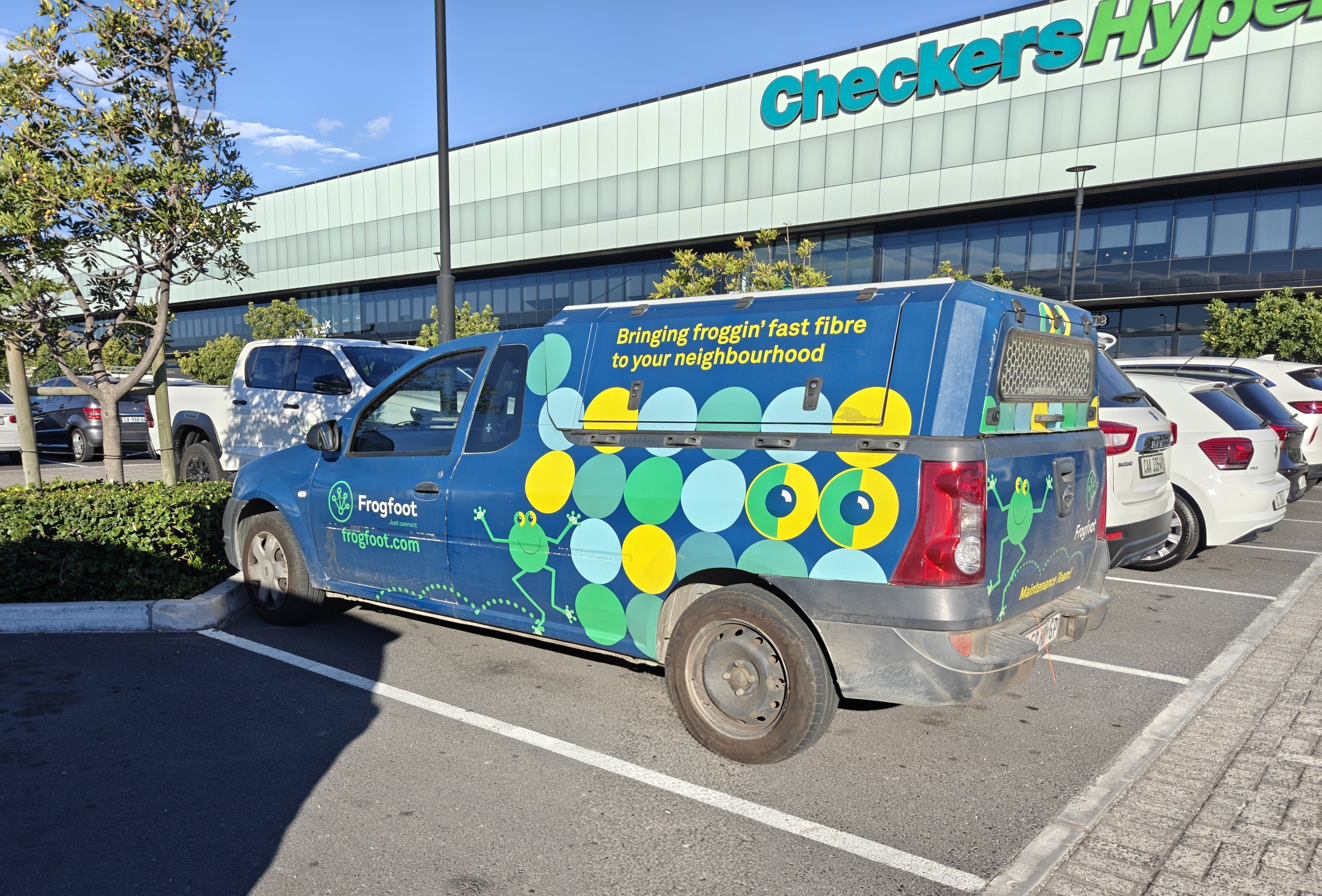
- Frogfoot vehicle in Cape Town
- Type: Private subsidiary
- Industry: Fiber internet infrastructure
- Founded: 2005; 21 years ago
- Headquarters: Cape Town, South Africa
- Area served: South Africa
- Key people: Shane Chorley (CEO)
- Services: Wholesale fiber optic connectivity
- Parent: Vivica Group (since 2015)
- Divisions: Frogfoot Rise
- Website: frogfoot.co.za

Frogfoot Networks, commonly referred to as Frogfoot, is a major South African open-access fiber network operator (FNO). The company installs fiber to the premises (FTTX) infrastructure throughout the country. It is a wholly-owned subsidiary of South African holding company Vivica Group, which also operates local ISP Vox Telecom.

Founded in 2005, and headquartered in Cape Town, Frogfoot is SA's fifth-largest FNO, and competes with the likes of Vumatel and Openserve in the local fiber market.

== History ==
In 2015, Frogfoot was acquired by South African ISP Vox Telecom, as part of the latter's plans to build its own fiber network to service business clients. It was confirmed that Frogfoot would operate as a separate entity within Vox Telecom's carrier and connectivity division, and would continue to provide wholesale fiber to other companies, on an open-access basis. At the time of the acquisition, which was Vox's fifth within a year, Frogfoot had around 40 employees.

In November 2018, Frogfoot confirmed that, as part of a fiber network expansion program that had begun in 2016, it had passed an additional 30,000 homes, 20,000 of which were in the Western Cape. The company said it was on track to bring fiber-to-the-home (FTTH) to an additional 14,000 residences in Cape Town's Southern Peninsula by April 2019, and had set a goal of connecting 150,000 homes across South Africa by the end of 2019.

In September 2019, Frogfoot announced plans to reach 200,000 connected residences within the coming 18 months. The company said that, due to network saturation, as with other major fiber network operators, it was shifting its focus away from major metros, and towards smaller towns.

In September 2021, Frogfoot acquired Link Africa's Western Cape assets, some of which were originally built through a partnership between Frogfoot and Link Africa. The deal increased Frogfoot's total homes passed to 312,000.

In 2022, Frogfoot's parent company, Vox Telecom, changed its name to Vivica Group.

In 2023, it was reported that Frogfoot provided services to over 190 wholesale providers, 135,000 residential customers, and 13,000 businesses. At the time, Frogfoot said it had recently invested in the uptime availability of its nodes, and in rolling out a dark national long-distance network.

In October 2023, Frogfoot acquired two more existing fiber network infrastructure companies - Garden Route Networks and Route Fibre Networks. The acquisitions added 8,187 already-connected homes to the Frogfoot network, in areas including Mossel Bay, Stellenbosch, Somerset West, and Durbanville.

That same month, Frogfoot launched a pilot of Frogfoot Rise, a product launched specifically to increase internet access in underserved, low-income areas of South Africa. The company confirmed that the offering would be rolled out to between 40,000 and 45,000 homes, within a 6-month period. The product was differentiated from traditional fiber installations which require a router, by installing an optical network terminal (ONT) that includes built-in WiFi capabilities, thus negating the need for an ISP-billed installation fee. The new packages were offered at below average market rates, via a voucher system, for the equivalent of under R10 per day.

In June 2024, Frogfoot's network had reached 380,000 homes passed, and 165,000 homes connected, giving it a connection ratio of 43.42%. In comparison, around the same time, competitor Openserve had 1.26 million homes passed and 591,000 connected, for a ratio of 48.97%. In mid-2023, competitor Vumatel had around 2 million homes passed and roughly 664,000 connected, for a connectivity ratio of 33.2%.

In February 2025, Frogfoot acquired American Tower Africa's (ATC Africa) fiber infrastructure assets. The deal included 11,000 km of fiber optic cabling across South Africa.

In December 2025, Frogfoot expanded in the North West province through the acquisition of fiber assets owned by Infinity Wireless. The assets would be linked to Frogfoot's national network over a 1-year period, and Infinity would continue operating as an ISP thereafter.

In February 2026, Frogfoot acquired fiber infrastructure assets in KwaZulu-Natal, built and operated by Mitsol. Frogfoot said the network would be linked to its existing national one, and that Mitsol would continue operating as an ISP, under the Resinet brand.

== Operations ==
As of 2023, Frogfoot operates around 7,000 km of fiber infrastructure across South Africa. The company operates a national long-distance network, provides services to residential and business clients, and provides wholesale access to its network, to around 140 ISPs.

Its network supports speeds, as of its 2025 wholesale offering, ranging from 10/1 Mbps asymmetrical through 1/1 Gbps symmetrical packages.

The Frogfoot network uses 53 x 200 Gbit/s channels between regions. Its network partners include Juniper Adva, Extreme, Ciena, and Ubiquiti. Frogfoot's connectivity to homes is provided via a GPON network, and the company has tested XGSPON tech, which would enable 10 Gbit/s connectivity per end user.

As of April 2025, Frogfoot had passed a total of 406,000 homes, and connected 169,000, which gives the company a connectivity ratio of 41.63%, and makes it South Africa's fifth-largest fiber network operator.

== See also ==
- Internet in South Africa
- Telecommunications in South Africa
