= Cool Ideas (South Africa) =

South African based ISP

- Industry: Telecommunications
- Founded: 2011; 15 years ago
- Founder: Paul Butschi; Andre Jooste
- Headquarters: Johannesburg, South Africa
- Area served: South Africa
- Products: Fiber internet services
- Owner: Afrihost (majority stake)
- Website: coolideas.co.za

Cool Ideas is a South African internet service provider (ISP), providing fiber internet services to the South African market.

== History ==
Cool Ideas was founded in 2011, by Paul Butschi and Andre Jooste. Originally, Cool Ideas offered fiber to the business via South African open-access fiber infrastructure provider Dark Fibre Africa (DFA), and when South African fiber infrastructure provider Vumatel launched in Parkhurst, Johannesburg, the founders decided to begin offering services in the fiber to the home market.

In 2021, a partial acquisition of Cool Ideas by Afrihost, another South African ISP, was approved by the Competition Commission, South Africa's anti-monopoly regulator. This resulted in Afrihost acquiring a majority stake in Cool Ideas. However, it was decided that latter would continue operating as a distinct brand, comprise the same management team and employees, and its original shareholders would retain their stakes in the company.

In April 2025, Cool Ideas acquired the totality of competing ISP Mind The Speed's customer base.

== Achievements ==
In 2018, Cool Ideas won MyBroadband's ISP of the Year Award.

In 2020, Cool Ideas won MyBroadband's ISP of the Year Award.

In 2021, Cool Ideas won MyBroadband's Best Fibre ISP of the Year Award.

In 2022/3, Cool Ideas won MyBroadband's Best Fibre ISP of the Year Award.

In 2024, Cool Ideas was ranked the fastest ISP in South Africa by Ookla, and was thus named the Best Fixed ISP in South Africa for 2024.
