= Cool Ideas =

Cool Ideas may refer to:

- Bickford Shmeckler's Cool Ideas, 2006 American comedy film
- Cool Ideas (South Africa), South African internet service provider
