= VMSA =

VMSA may refer to:

- Virgin Mobile South Africa, a mobile virtual network operator
- Veritas Volume Manager Storage Administrator, of the Veritas Volume Manager
- Virtual Memory System Architecture, the ARM architecture implementation of MMU
