= Johannesburg Internet Exchange =

- Full name: Johannesburg Internet Exchange
- Abbreviation: JINX
- Founded: 1996
- Location: South Africa, Johannesburg
- Website: portal.inx.net.za/statistics/ixp

JINX (Johannesburg Internet Exchange), located at Johannesburg, South Africa, is an internet exchange point in South Africa. It is run by INX-ZA, which is an autonomous arm of the Internet Service Providers Association.

It started operating in 1996. The amount of traffic processed by the JINX has been steadily growing, and growth has been exponential in the second half of the 2000s (decade), with, for example, 450 Mbps peak-hour load in 2008 that almost doubled to 800 Mbit/s in early 2010. In part the growth can be attributed to the open peering policy adopted by some of the larger participants, like TENET and MWEB and the large content base that is available from provider like Internet Solutions. When using JINX figures to extrapolate Internet usage stats in South Africa, bear in mind that a significant amount of traffic does not go through the public switch fabric, but is changed over private peering sessions.

Most major South African Internet service providers have chosen to peer via JINX: some examples are Internet Solutions, Neotel, TENET, iBurst, Vox Telecom and MWEB. Real time traffic statistics are available on the JINX Traffic Graphs.

In 2009, the ISPA restarted the exchange point in Cape Town, CINX, to complement JINX, and in September 2012, an exchange point in Durban, (DINX), was started.

The IP address block for JINX is 196.223.14.X/24, and 2001:43f8:1f0::/48.
In 2012, the ISPA appointed Nishal Goburdhan as the full-time manager of the Internet Exchange points in South Africa.

== Governance structure of JINX ==
As a peering point the JINX is open to any network that is able to peer. Initially, the JINX was only available to ISPA members, but in 2008 a resolution was passed to allow non-ISPA members to connect to the JINX. As at Sep 2016, the three Internet exchange points mentioned above are all managed through a community elected set of representatives that act in the best of interests of the IXP. While voting is limited to IXP participants, eligibility to be on the management committee is open to any natural person, and not just IXP participants. Working groups, like the INX-wg exist for the participants to discuss matters of concern and interest, and to generate feedback to the INX management committee. Proposals and suggestions are thus generated at the INX-wg level, and voted on within the INX management committee.

== Milestones ==
In 2016, JINX became the multisite, extending beyond its initial base of operations to additional locations within the metropolitan area.
