= ISPA =

ISPA may refer to:

- Indian Space Association (ISpA)
- Institute of Space and Planetary Astrophysics
- Instrument for Structural Policies for Pre-Accession, part of the European Union Regional policy
- International Sleep Products Association
- Internet Service Providers Association (disambiguation)
  - Internet Service Providers Association (United Kingdom)
  - Internet Service Providers Association (South Africa)
- Iranian Students Polling Agency
- Immunization of School Pupils Act, vaccination law in Ontario, Canada
