= CBCS =

CBCS may refer to:

- CBCS (cable system) or Cameroon-Brazil Cable System, a planned transatlantic submarine communications cable.
- Comic Book Certification Service, a comic book grading service based in Plano, Texas that is part of the larger Beckett Media Company.
- Consortium of Bangsamoro Civil Society, a network of Moro civil society organizations in Mindanao.
- CBCS-FM, a radio station (99.9 FM) licensed to Sudbury, Ontario, Canada
- CBCS-TV-1, a television station (channel 8) licensed to Meadow Lake, Saskatchewan, Canada, rebroadcasting CKSA-TV Lloydminster
- Chevaliers Beneficient De La Cité-Sainté, one of the three schools of Martinism
- Chinese Bible Church of Springfield, a non-denominational Christian church
- Opus-CBCS, a Fidonet Bulletin Board system
- Choice Based Credit System, a course credit system for undergrad students in India
