= Frogfoot =

Frogfoot may refer to:

- Sukhoi Su-25, NATO reporting name Frogfoot, a Soviet military aircraft
- Frogfoot, a broadband provider in South Africa

== See also ==
- Frog legs, consumed as food
