= TENET (network) =

- Tertiary Education and Research Network of South Africa
- Abbreviation: TENET
- Pronunciation: /tɛnɛt/
- Predecessor: UNINET Project
- Formation: August 2000; 25 years ago
- Registration no.: 2000/020780/08
- Legal status: non profit company
- Purpose: National Research and Education Network
- Headquarters: Mowbray, Cape Town
- Region served: South Africa
- Affiliations: UbuntuNet Alliance, ISPA, USAf, HEITSA, WAPA
- Website: www.tenet.ac.za

TENET operates South Africa's national research and education network, SANReN, in collaboration with the SANReN team of the NICIS.

== Structure ==
TENET is a membership-based, non profit company incorporated in South Africa. Its members are the public universities and statutory research councils it serves. Its board of directors is appointed by the members at an annual general meeting.

== Network ==
TENET acts as a comprehensive Internet service provider as well as a research and education network: it operates the South African National Research Network (SANReN), a large-scale government infrastructure project that provides network connectivity between higher educational and research organisations. In addition, it maintains private peering links with a number of large ISPs in South Africa and peers at both the JINX (in Johannesburg) and CINX (in Cape Town) Internet exchange points. International connectivity at 10 Gbit/s is provided from points of presence in London and Amsterdam via the SEACOM cable. A second 20 Gbit/s route on the WACS cable up the West Coast provides redundant access and was obtained as an IRU by South Africa's Department of Science and Technology as part of the broader aims of SANReN and in support of bandwidth-hungry applications such as the Square Kilometer Array and MeerKAT radio telescope.

== Services ==
TENET operates a growing bundle of services in support of research & education in South Africa. These include:

- Video conferencing
- the eduroam national roaming operator for South Africa
- South African Identity Federation (SAFIRE), which is a member of the global eduGAIN inter-federation.
- a sector CSIRT (in conjunction with SANReN)

== Relationships to other research networks ==
As a founder member of the UbuntuNet Alliance for Research and Education Networking, an African confederation of research and education networks, TENET is committed to improving regional connections.

TENET was connected to GÉANT in October 2004, a relationship that was subsequently subsumed by the UbuntuNet Alliance.
