= @lantic Rugby Sevens =

- The official @lantic Rugby Sevens logo, in use since 2011
- Founded: 2007
- Region: South Africa
- Teams: 16 (per tournament); 256 (total)
- Current champions: Tygerberg High School
- Website: SA Sevens official website

@lantic Rugby Sevens was the largest seven-a-side school rugby tournament in the world. It consists of a total of 256 teams from different high schools across South Africa and acted as a formal pathway for schoolboys to progress to the South African national sevens team and the 2016 Summer Olympics squad.

== History ==
@lantic Rugby Sevens was founded in July 2007 after @lantic, a local South African Internet service provider, saw the opportunity to develop talent at a junior level for the national sevens team and decided to invest in the community through sport.

In 2008, the @lantic Rugby Sevens series hosted its first Champion of Champions tournament at Atomic Sport Academy. Harmony Sport Academy from Virginia, Free State, out played fifteen other teams to take the crown as the best schools sevens team in South Africa, that year.

Due to the success of the @lantic Rugby Sevens series, a provincial tournament was born in 2011. This tournament, commonly referred to as the Sevens Craven Week, provides a platform for schoolboys to be selected for the South African national sevens rugby team. The Blue Bulls beat the Cheetahs 43–14 in the cup final to take the title of @lantic Provincial U18 champions in 2011.

The @lantic Provincial U18 tournament took place on 4 and 5 October in 2012.

== Rules and regulations ==
The followings rules and regulations were enforced during the @lantic Rugby Sevens series tournaments:

1. Seven players per team on the field at any given time.
2. Five substitutes are allowed per team.
3. Rolling substitutions are permitted only during stoppages in the game. Teams may make use of all five substitutes.
4. Games commence at the sound of the referee's whistle.
5. Games consist of seven-minute halves, except in the final of the competition which consists of ten-minute halves.
6. A two-minute half-time break is permitted during each game and a four-minute break between matches.
7. Teams must be on time and ensure they know when they are playing their next game.
8. A coin toss takes place during the half-time of the preceding game to decide which team begins with the ball.
9. Any minor injuries must be dealt with quickly and players should be moved out of the way so that the game can continue.
10. Any player receiving a yellow card must leave the playing field for a period of two minutes.
11. Any player receiving a red card is suspended for the remainder of the tournament.
12. During pool games, two points are awarded for matches won, one point is awarded for matches drawn and no points are awarded for matches lost.
13. Teams with the most points will play for the Cup. Teams with the second highest points will play for the Plate. Teams with the third highest points will play for the Bowl and teams with the lowest points will play for the Shield.
14. If points are equal after the pool games, the following format is applied to decide the placing:
  - Points Difference will determine which teams play for which trophies
  - If that is equal, placement will be decided upon the number of tries scored
  - If that is equal, the team who scored the first try will be placed for the respective trophy
  - If that is equal, the team to be placed will be decided upon through a coin toss
15. In the Cup, Plate, Bowl and Shield final, if the score is equal after normal time then three minutes extra-time is played. The first team to score any points during this time will be awarded the winner. If the score is still equal after extra-time, the following format is applied to determine the winner:
  - The team who scored the first try in the tournament is declared the winner
  - If that is equal, then the team that scored the most tries in the tournament is declared the winner
  - If that is equal, then the trophy is shared

== Champion of Champions tournament ==
The Champion of Champions tournament is a tournament played amongst the champions from each of the 16 tournaments played across the country during the respective year. All 16 teams play to win the title of the best school sevens team in South Africa.

In the past, the best player from every tournament was invited to a training camp where they got the chance to demonstrate their ability and earn a place in the @lantic Invitational Team. The invitational team has played in the international IRB Dubai Sevens twice and once in the Trustco International Tournament hosted in Namibia, winning their division at all 3 events.

=== Results ===
Year	Cup Winner	Plate Winner	Bowl Winner	Shield Winner	Venue
2008	Harmony Sport Academy	Hoërskool Voortrekker	Dale College	Hoërskool Monument	Atomic Sport Academy
2009	Hoërskool Monument	Harmony Sport Academy	Hoërskool Tygerberg	Hoërskool Diamantveld	Konka Sports Academy
2010	Hoërskool Tygerberg	Grey High	Hoërskool Brandwag	Hoërskool Sentraal	Konka Sports Academy
2011	Hoërskool Tygerberg	Harmony Monument	Hoërskool Brandwag	Hoërskool Standerton	Konka Sports Academy

== @lantic Provincial Tournament ==
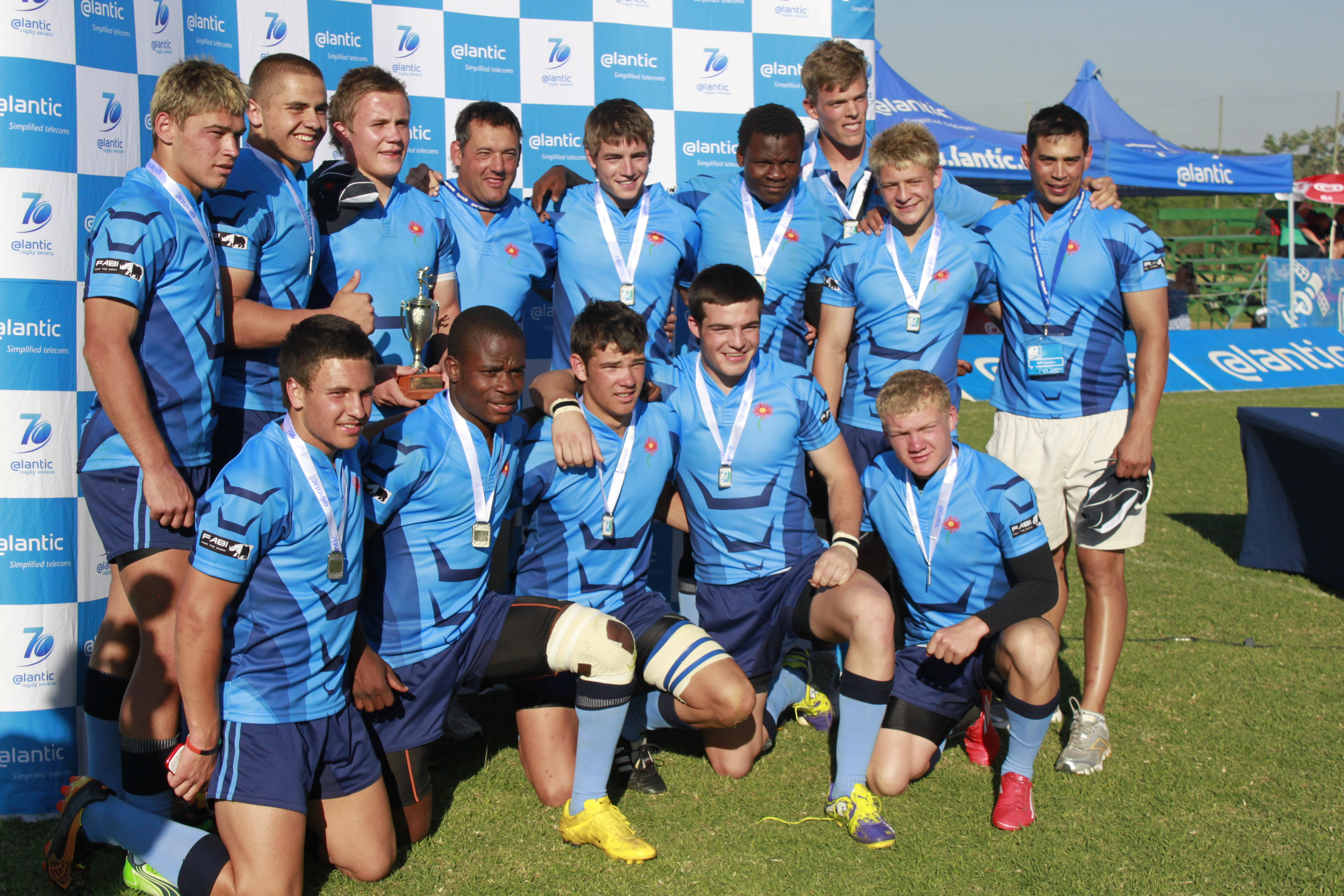
2011 U/18 Provincial Champions - Blue Bulls

The @lantic Provincial tournament, commonly referred to as the Sevens Craven Week, was a sevens rugby tournament played amongst twenty provincial high school teams, including Namibia and Zimbabwe, and sixteen provincial primary school teams. It was founded in 2011 after the success of the @lantic sevens rugby series and will eventually act as a feeder system for the South African national sevens rugby team. At the conclusion of the tournament a South African schools sevens team is selected.

In 2011, the Blue Bulls and Western Province won the under eighteen and under thirteen divisions, respectively.
