= Mass media in Africa =

News media of a continent

The media in Africa is expanding rapidly due to advances in telecommunications, especially mobile phones and the internet. In newspaper reporting, many Africans have won international media awards. In writing both prose and poetry, many awards have also been won by Africans, and Africa now claims a Nobel Laureate in Literature, Prof. Wole Soyinka of Nigeria, and Novelist Naguib Mahfouz of Egypt. Cairo is considered the nexus of the regional entertainment industry, including films, television, and recorded music.

== History ==
In 1794 the first printing press arrived in Africa delivered to Freetown, Sierra Leone, but was destroyed by a French raiding party before it was ever used. When another press arrived in 1800 the newspaper the Sierra Leone Advertiser began being printed.

== Print media ==
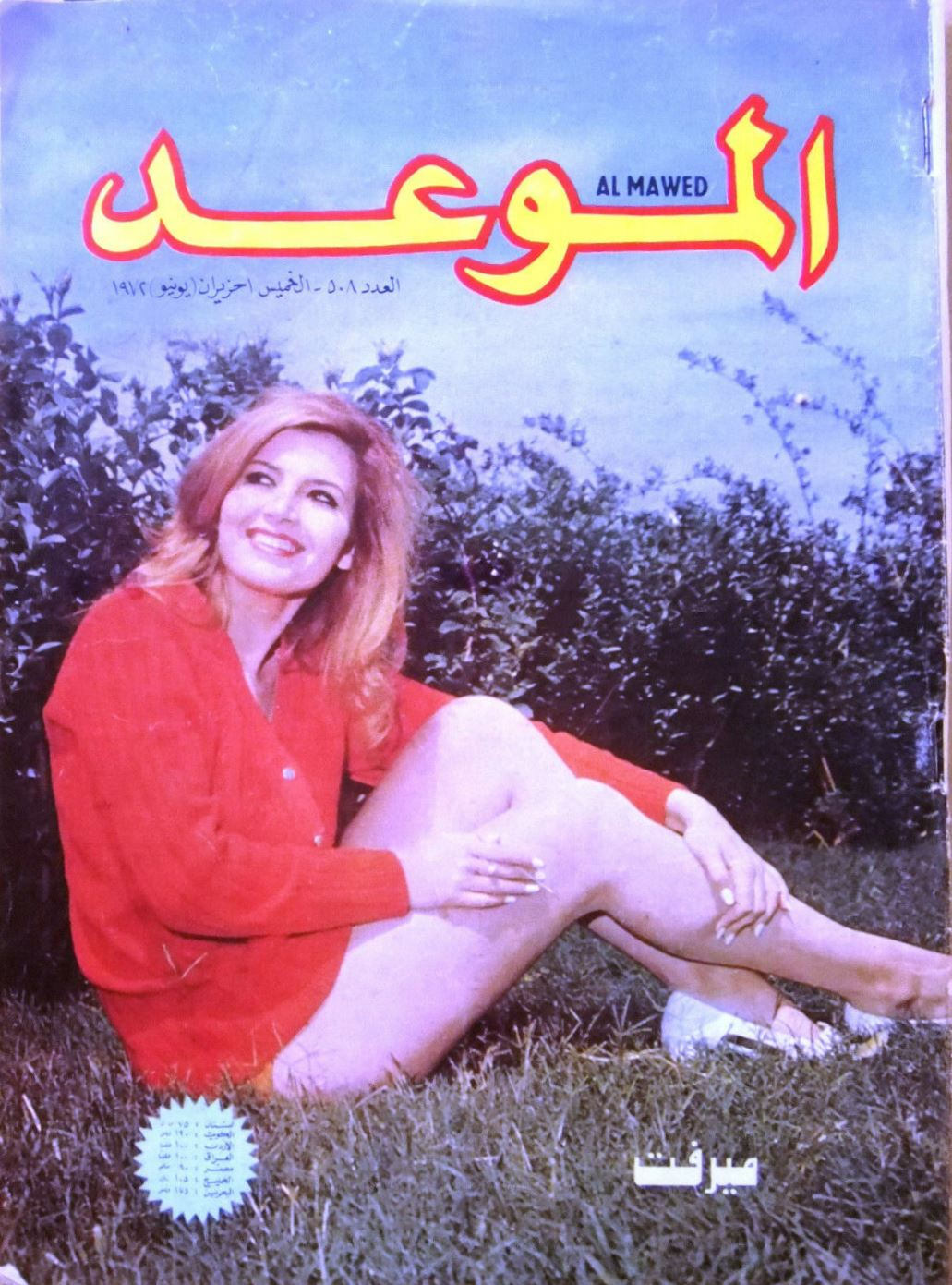
Actress Mervat Amin on the cover for Al-Mawwid magazine, June 1972

Historically, Nigeria has boasted one of the most free and resilient newspaper presses of any African country, even under its past military dictatorships, most of whom have shown an intolerance of the press. In the rest of the continent, vibrant journalism is also getting to be the order of the day. As in more developed countries, many journalists, in a bid to uphold the integrity of the profession, have preferred to go to jail rather than betray the confidentiality of a source.

In 2005, journalists representing 23 African nations met in Cameroon and established the Society for the Development of Media in Africa (Société pour le Développement des Médias Africains, SDMA).

== See also ==
Articles on the media of each African country appear with the title "Media of [name of country]", for example: Media of Nigeria, Media of Côte d'Ivoire, Media of Burkina Faso.

- Lists of newspapers of Africa
- List of radio stations in Africa
- List of television stations in Africa
- African Union of Broadcasting
- Internet in Africa
- African comics
