= WASACE =

- Cable type: Fibre-optic
- Fate: planned, not yet operational
- Design capacity: 100x100 Gbit/s, 4 -6 fibre pairs
- Landing points: Melkbosstrand, South Africa; Cape Town, South Africa; Melkbosstrand, South Africa; Boony Island, Nigeria; Fortaleza, Brazil; Rio de Janeiro, Brazil; Santos, Brazil; Cartagena, Colombia; Colón, Panama; Lagos, Nigeria; San Sebastian, Spain; Luanda, Angola; Miami, Florida, United States; Virginia Beach, Virginia, United States; Lannion, France
- Owner(s): WASACE Cable Company Worldwide Holding

WASACE was a planned system of submarine communications cables consisting of four sections with a total length of 29,000 km linking four continents.

Original proposal:

- WASACE North, from Spain to the United States
- WASACE South, from Brazil to Nigeria
- WASACE America, from Brazil to North America.
- WASACE Africa, from Nigeria via Angola to South Africa

WASACE Africa would potentially be the fifth cable running from South Africa to Nigeria.

WASACE South would be the third cable linking Latin America to Africa, and would compete on a direct route from Africa to Brazil with the planned South Atlantic Express (SAEx) cable. The first cable from Latin America to Africa is the Atlantis-2 cable which runs from Brazil to Portugal via Cape Verde and Senegal.

The WASACE system will focus on developing new routes from Africa to Latin America and the US. The Company says that it will be offering two of the major international capacity routes and enabling three new underdeveloped direct traffic routes: Africa to the US, Africa to Latin America and Latin America to Europe. The key part of the project however is a link from Africa to the US via Brazil, which offers an alternative routing to North America that does not need to travel via Europe and the North Atlantic. It also has the potential to deliver connectivity from Asia to the US via Africa and Latin America as an alternative to Europe or the Pacific. Further WASACE is planned to be connected to the SEACOM cable system which runs on the East coast of Africa and branches to India and Europe.

The project is divided into four sections; WASACE North connecting Europe to North America, WASACE South connecting South America to Africa, WASACE America connecting South America to North America and WASACE Africa connecting Nigeria, Angola and South Africa.

The project is headed by WASACE Cable Company Worldwide Holding and project development will be managed by US-based David Ross Group. The company intends to get all four cables built by the end of the first quarter of 2014, prior to the FIFA World Cup that will take place summer 2014 in Brazil. Submarine cable vendors are planned to be selected in Q1 2012 and a supplier contract will be signed Q2 2012.

WASCASE Cable Company Worldwide holding was originally formed to meet the increasing needs of the developing markets in the Global South.

== Technology ==
WASACE claims the system will be the first to employ next-generation 100 Gbit/s fibre-optic technology, offering "ten times the capacity of previous systems". Current plans are to lay 4 to 6 fiber pairs using 100 wavelengths carriers of 100 Gbit/s on each pair which would result in a capacity of 40 to 60 Tbit/s per segment, more than double to triple the number of all transatlantic cables in service during 2012. The project will also include the first ever high capacity cable reaching into the South Atlantic. The WASACE is the largest submarine cable project in the Atlantic Ocean.

== Investors ==
Funders of the cable include VIP Must and the African Development Bank as well as other unnamed investors from Brazil and elsewhere. VIP Must is WASACE's strategic partner and will provide financing, marketing and media strategy as well as institutional support. Although there has been no exact estimate, the project is expected to cost billions.

== Landing points ==
- Cape Town, South Africa
- Melkbosstrand, South Africa
- Boony Island, Nigeria
- Fortaleza, Brazil
- Rio de Janeiro, Brazil
- Santos, Brazil
- Cartagena, Colombia
- Colon, Panama
- Lagos, Nigeria
- Lannion, France
- San Sebastian, Spain
- Luanda, Angola
- Miami, Florida, United States
- Virginia Beach, Virginia, United States

== See also ==
- SAIL (cable system)
- SAex
- SEACOM
