= Broadband Infraco =

South African state-owned telecoms company

Broadband Infraco SOC Ltd
- Type: State-owned company
- Industry: Telecoms
- Incorporated: 2008; 18 years ago
- Founded: 2007; 19 years ago
- Founder: Government of South Africa
- Headquarters: 2040 Octave Road, Honeydew, Johannesburg, Gauteng, South Africa
- Area served: South Africa
- Key people: Gift Zowa (CEO); Zandile Kabini (Chairperson)
- Services: Wholesale broadband connectivity Telecoms network infrastructure Co-location; Network operations and maintenance
- Revenue: ▲ R586.786 million (2025)
- Net income: ▼ − R289.510 million (2025)
- Total assets: ▲ R1.543 billion (2025)
- Total equity: ▼ − R301.352 million (2025)
- Owner: Department of Communications and Digital Technologies (74%); Industrial Development Corporation (26%)
- Number of employees: 121 (2025)
- Website: infraco.co.za

Broadband Infraco, officially Broadband Infraco SOC Ltd, is a South African state-owned telecoms company based in Johannesburg, Gauteng. It reports to the South African Government via the Department of Communications and Digital Technologies (DCDT).

As of 2026, Broadband Infraco operates a national telecoms infrastructure network, and provides wholesale broadband connectivity and related services. Its operations include the provision, operation, and maintenance of fiber infrastructure, as well as regional and international connectivity.

== History ==
Broadband Infraco was established by the Department of Public Enterprises (DPE) in 2007, as a state-owned telecoms infrastructure company intended to increase competition in the national market, and reduce the cost of broadband connectivity.

In 2008, the company acquired the original long-distance fiber network assets developed by Eskom Enterprises and Transnet, and began expanding the infrastructure. By 2009, its network comprised approximately 11,765 km of transmission links, and 137 long-distance sites, with connections to neighboring countries including Botswana, Mozambique, Namibia, and Zimbabwe.

In October 2009, the Independent Communications Authority of South Africa (ICASA) awarded Broadband Infraco an Individual Electronic Communications Network Services licence, allowing it to provide electronic communications network services to licensed operators using its fiber infrastructure. The company adopted a wholesale, carrier-of-carriers model, rather than entering the retail telecoms market.

On 18 November 2010, Broadband Infraco was formally launched in Johannesburg, Gauteng. At launch, it provided national backhaul services to telecoms operators and ISPs, and had received approximately R1.64 billion in funding from the government and the Industrial Development Corporation.

During 2010 and 2011, Broadband Infraco expanded its national network and established more connectivity to countries in the Southern African Development Community (SADC). By early 2011, its fiber network covered approximately 12,250 km, connecting major South African centers and providing regional connectivity to Lesotho, Namibia, Botswana, Mozambique, Zimbabwe, and Eswatini.

Broadband Infraco was also an investor in the West Africa Cable System (WACS), a submarine fiber cable linking South Africa with the United Kingdom, along the western coast of Africa. WACS was launched in May 2012, providing an additional international connectivity route for South Africa and other participating countries. Broadband Infraco was one of the South African investors in the system, alongside Telkom, Neotel, MTN, and Vodacom.

In 2012, Broadband Infraco began a major program to replace and upgrade its legacy network equipment. The company also underwent an organizational restructuring after failing to meet most of its shareholder compact targets in the 2010/11 financial year. By the end of 2012, key executive positions had been filled following the restructuring.

By 2014, Broadband Infraco had expanded its customer base from four in 2012 to 15. These included major South African mobile network operators Cell C, MTN, and Vodacom, as well as Liquid Intelligent Technologies. That same year, Broadband Infraco sold capacity for the Square Kilometre Array project, and renewed approximately half of its aging network transmission equipment.

In 2014, responsibility for Broadband Infraco was transferred from the Department of Public Enterprises to the newly established Department of Telecommunications and Postal Services (DTPS). The transfer placed the company within the same ministerial portfolio as several other state-owned telecoms entities, including Sentech and the State Information Technology Agency.

Broadband Infraco subsequently became involved in the implementation of South Africa Connect, the government's national broadband program. In 2017, the DTPS developed a new delivery model for the program in collaboration with Broadband Infraco, SITA, other state-owned entities, as well as numerous private sector companies. Implementation of the revised model began in 2018, with Broadband Infraco providing infrastructure for connectivity to government facilities and underserved areas.

In 2019, the government announced plans to merge Broadband Infraco with Sentech, to form a new State Digital Infrastructure Company. The proposed merger was intended to reduce duplication between state-owned telecoms infrastructure entities and consolidate their infrastructure and operations.

In October 2020, the government said it was proceeding with the proposed Broadband Infraco–Sentech merger and that a business case had been finalized. The proposed State Digital Infrastructure Company would require legislative changes before it could be established.

The proposed merger did not proceed on its original timetable. By 2022, the government described the process as being at an advanced stage, but implementation was subsequently delayed. In 2024, the Department of Communications and Digital Technologies confirmed that the merger of Broadband Infraco and Sentech remained the preferred rationalization option, but that implementation had been delayed by changes in the government's preferred approach to implementing the merger.

Broadband Infraco's financial position deteriorated during the early 2020s. The company recorded consecutive annual losses from 2019 onwards, and in the 2024/25 financial year, it reported a net loss of approximately R289 million. A due diligence assessment conducted in connection with the proposed Sentech acquisition found Broadband Infraco to be technically insolvent and to have a liquidity ratio below one. The assessment posited that the acquisition could place financial strain on both entities and affect service delivery.

In 2025, the company reported that it had deployed 6,312 community Wi-Fi hotspots nationwide, in partnership with 76 different ISPs. At the time, its network comprised approximately 15,000 km of fiber cable and 156 points of presence.

In 2026, the proposed merger with Sentech remained under consideration. The DCDT moved the target for implementation of the State Digital Infrastructure Company to the 2028/29 financial year.

== Operations ==
As of 2026, Broadband Infraco operates a national telecoms infrastructure network providing wholesale broadband connectivity and related telecoms services to licensed operators, internet service providers (ISPs), government institutions, and other customers.

Its operations include the provision and maintenance of fiber network infrastructure, network operations and maintenance services, and connectivity to regional and international telecoms networks.

== Corporate social responsibility ==
Broadband Infraco operates a corporate social investment (CSI) program focused on improving educational opportunities and digital access for disadvantaged communities. Initiatives have included providing broadband connectivity and digital learning facilities to schools, refurbishing educational institutions, donating educational equipment, and providing cybersecurity training.

The company has also supported youth and female-owned enterprises through its supply chain, and identified youth skills development, including internships, as part of its CSR program.

== See also ==
- Internet in South Africa
- Telecoms in South Africa
- Department of Communications and Digital Technologies
