= Maziv =

South African fiber infrastructure company

- Formerly: Business Venture Investments Pty Ltd
- Type: Private
- Industry: Telecommunications; Internet
- Founded: 2022; 4 years ago
- Headquarters: Johannesburg, Gauteng, South Africa
- Area served: South Africa
- Key people: Dietlof Maré (CEO)
- Products: Fiber infrastructure
- Services: FTTX; Telecommunications
- Revenue: ▲ R7.6 billion (2026)
- Owner: CIVH (70%); Vodacom (30%)
- Subsidiaries: Vumatel; Dark Fibre Africa
- Website: maziv.com

Maziv, officially Maziv Pty Ltd, is a South African telecommunications infrastructure company. Founded in 2022 and headquartered in Johannesburg, Maziv was created to consolidate the fiber network businesses of Community Investment Ventures Holdings (CIVH).

The company owns South Africa's largest consumer fiber-to-the-premises infrastructure operator Vumatel, and by extension, CCTV company Vumacam. Maziv also owns wholesale open-access fiber infrastructure company Dark Fibre Africa (DFA), and has indirect stakes in South African ISPs Herotel, SADV, and Rise Telecoms.

== History ==
Maziv was founded in 2022, when Community Investment Ventures Holdings (CIVH) consolidated its fiber network businesses, Vumatel and Dark Fibre Africa (DFA), under a newly formed fiber infrastructure company.

In August 2023, Maziv launched a R400 million expansion of DFA's fiber infrastructure network, including the deployment of 800 additional underground distribution cabinets across South Africa.

In October 2024, the South African Competition Tribunal blocked a proposed acquisition of a 30% to 40% stake in Maziv by major South African telecoms company Vodacom, following a lengthy regulatory process.

In August 2025, the South African Competition Appeal Court overturned the Competition Tribunal's decision and approved Vodacom's acquisition of a 30% stake in Maziv, subject to revised conditions.

In December 2025, major South African telecoms company Vodacom acquired a 30% shareholding in Maziv, for a sum of R12.6 billion, comprising R7.9 billion in cash and R4.9 billion worth of fiber assets.

== Operations ==
As of 2026, Maziv's operations include:

Company	Relationship to Maziv	Shareholding	Type	Established	Acquired	Headquarters	Ref
Vumatel	Subsidiary	100%	Open-access last-mile residential and commercial fiber infrastructure	2014; 12 years ago	Brought under Maziv during the 2022 CIVH restructuring	Johannesburg, Gauteng	
Dark Fibre Africa	Subsidiary	100%	Open-access wholesale metro and long-haul fiber infrastructure	2007; 19 years ago	Brought under Maziv during the 2022 CIVH restructuring	Centurion, Gauteng	
Herotel	Indirect investment through Vumatel	49.96%	Fiber and wireless ISP	2013; 13 years ago	Vumatel acquired an initial minority interest in 2022, and subsequently increased its interest	Stellenbosch, Western Cape	
SADV	Indirect investment through Vumatel	100%	FTTH and FTTB ISP	2019; 7 years ago	CIVH acquired a 38% stake in SA Digital Villages in 2016, and acquired the remaining interest in 2019. SADV's fiber infrastructure was subsequently transferred to Vumatel in 2020, while the SADV ISP business continued as a standalone business within the CIVH group	Johannesburg, Gauteng	
Rise Telecoms	Indirect investment through Vumatel	100%	Fiber and wireless ISP	2015; 11 years ago	Acquired by Vumatel	Randburg, Gauteng	
Vumacam	Indirect investment through Vumatel	51%	Tech-enabled security services, including a CCTV	2018; 8 years ago	Established as a joint venture involving Vumatel, and subsequently included in the Maziv Group through Vumatel	Randburg, Gauteng	

== Corporate social responsibility ==
Maziv undertakes corporate social investment (CSI) initiatives through its subsidiaries, focused on digital inclusion, education, skills development, community upliftment, and environmental sustainability. Its programs include providing free high-speed fiber internet to schools, digital-literacy initiatives, and sports development programs for children from underserved communities.

Through Vumatel, Maziv provides participating schools located along its network with free fiber connectivity. By 2020, the initiative had connected a total of 300 schools. By 2026, it had connected 1,000 schools, providing connectivity to an estimated 860,000 students and 40,000 teachers.

== See also ==
- Internet in South Africa
- Telecoms in South Africa
