= MWEB =

Internet Service Provider based in South Africa

Mweb
- Company type: Subsidiary
- Industry: Telecommunications
- Founded: 1997; 29 years ago
- Headquarters: Cape Town, South Africa
- Areas served: South Africa
- Key people: Lizette Loxton (CFO)
- Products: Fiber to the home LTE; Web Hosting; Domains; Internet security
- Parent: Webafrica
- Website: mweb.co.za

Mweb (officially Mweb (Pty) Ltd and stylized as mweb) is an internet service provider (ISP) based in Cape Town, South Africa.

Founded in 1997, Mweb is now a subsidiary of fellow South African ISP, Webafrica.

== History ==
As one of the first Internet Service Providers in South Africa, Mweb launched dial-up internet in South Africa with the Big Black Box, in 1997, which was issued with a copy of tech expert Arthur Goldstuck's Hitchhiker's Guide to the Internet, the bestselling tech book in South Africa at the time.

In 2004 Mweb launched Polka, a low cost ISP. A year later, the South African division of Italian-owned ISP Tiscali was acquired by Mweb.

In 2006 its 3G mobile data offerings were launched and the company resold products from two of SA's largest mobile networks. The company was later first to launch Uncapped ADSL in South Africa, in 2010, and brought the global Fon WiFi network to South Africa in 2014.

Also in 2014, Mweb launched its first fiber-to-the-home packages. In 2015, the company was restructured to focus mainly on the residential and small business market. In addition the company sold its Mweb Business, Optinet and core network assets divisions to Internet Solutions, a division of Dimension Data.

In December 2016, Internet Solutions announced that it had entered an agreement with Naspers to acquire Mweb pending approval by the South African competition authorities. On 9 May 2017, it was announced that the South African competition authorities approved the proposed acquisition of Mweb with 31 May 2017 being the effective date of the sale.

In July 2017, Mweb launched a selection of LTE Advanced products in partnership with Rain, a fixed wireless broadband provider.

== Company structure ==
Mweb is owned by Webafrica. The ISP operates nationally, with its headquarters in Cape Town.

=== Retail stores ===
The company initially had five retail stores. The retail stores were closed at the end of March 2016, opting to move all of their sales online.

== See also ==
- Webafrica
