= OpenWeb (ISP) =

South African ISP

- Type: Private
- Industry: Telecommunications
- Founded: 2002
- Headquarters: Ballito, KwaZulu-Natal, South Africa
- Area served: South Africa
- Services: Fibre broadband, wireless internet, hosting, VoIP
- Website: https://openweb.co.za/

OpenWeb is a South African internet service provider (ISP) headquartered in Ballito, KwaZulu-Natal. Founded in 2002, the company provides internet access, mobile broadband, hosting services and voice over IP (VoIP) services.

== History ==
OpenWeb was established in 2002 and initially focused on broadband and ADSL internet services in South Africa. As the country's telecommunications market evolved, the company expanded its offerings to include fibre broadband, wireless internet access, hosting and cloud-based services.

In 2013, technology publication ITWeb reported on OpenWeb's participation in competition within the South African broadband market during a period of declining uncapped ADSL prices.

== Business and operations ==
OpenWeb operates as an independent internet service provider serving residential and business customers in South Africa. Its services include firbre broadband, fixed-wireless internet, mobile data, web hosting, virual private servers and VoIP services.

The company has also operated reseller and white-label programmes that allow third parties to market internet services using OpenWeb's infrastructure and billing systems.

== Coverage and reception ==
MyBroadband has reported on several aspects of OpenWeb's operations. In 2014, the publication examined the company's operating structure, including its licensing arrangements and relationship with upstream network providers. In 2016, MyBroadband reported on customer complaints relating to account cancellations and billing disputes, prompting changes to the company's customer support procedures. In 2017, the publication covered a dispute involving OpenWeb, Syrex and iONLINE concerning wholesale broadband services and customer migrations, which led to service disruptions affecting some customers.

OpenWeb has also been included in comparative assessments of South African internet service providers, including a 2014 MyGaming survey of South African ISPs and a 2016 assessment of customer ratings among local DSL providers. In 2026, LoveMedia reported that OpenWeb had been named "ISP of the Year" in a community poll conducted through LoveBallito WhatsApp groups.
