= Dark Fibre Africa =

South African fiber infrastructure company

- Type: Subsidiary
- Industry: Internet; Telecoms
- Founded: 2007; 19 years ago
- Headquarters: Centurion, Gauteng
- Area served: South Africa
- Services: Fiber infrastructure
- Revenue: ▲ R2.75 billion (2025)
- Operating income: ▲ R1.12 billion (2025)
- Parent: Maziv
- Website: dfafrica.co.za

Dark Fibre Africa, commonly referred to as DFA, is a South African long-haul wholesale open-access fiber infrastructure company. DFA was founded in 2007, and is headquartered in Centurion, Gauteng. It is a wholly owned subsidiary local internet infrastructure company Maziv, which also owns consumer FTTX infrastructure company Vumatel, and numerous South African ISPs.

As of 2026, the company operates a dark fiber network of around 15,000 km in length, across numerous South African provinces and major metro areas.

== History ==
DFA was founded in 2007, as a subsidiary of startup CIV Fibre Network Solutions (CIV FNS). The initial investment in DFA was R50 million. The company began rolling out its South African fiber network in October that same year, starting in the City of Johannesburg.

A 2008 Altech court ruling related to the ability of value-added network service providers to operate their own network infrastructure, created a larger market in which DFA could grow its network. By November 2008, DFA had laid approximately xxxkm of fiber in Johannesburg, and was expanding into Cape Town, Durban, and Pretoria.

In 2009, the company developed its first major long-haul route, from Pretoria to Mtunzini, representing a shift from building in metropolitan areas to focusing on developing a national network.

In 2010, DFA's network surpassed 1,000 km.

In 2012, the company completed its Cape Town to Yzerfontein long-haul route, and its network reached a total size of over 5,000 km. By that point, DFA was connected to numerous major undersea fiber cable landing systems, including SEACOM and EASSy at Mtunzini, and WACS and SAT-3 in the Western Cape.

By early 2014, DFA had invested over R5 billion in its network, which had exceeded 8,000 km in length.

That same year, DFA acquired MCT Telecommunications, with the South African Competition Tribunal having approved the transaction in October that year. That same year, DFA expanded its FTTB network through the acquisition of Conduct Telecommunications.

Also in 2014, DFA received approval for a government-supported fiber infrastructure project in Gauteng, which ended up being worth approximately R100 million. The project expanded fiber infrastructure into numerous underserved areas across the province.

By 2017, DFA had expanded its network to approximately 10,000 km.

In 2021, major South African mobile network provider Vodacom announced that it intended to acquire a 30% shareholding in a newly-formed infrastructure company (later named Maziv) that would contain the material assets of CIVH, including DFA and Vumatel. The transaction would involve both a cash investment and the contribution of certain Vodacom fiber assets.

In 2022, DFA was brought under new South African internet infrastructure company Maziv, during the restructuring of Community Investment Ventures Holdings (CIVH).

== Operations ==
DFA is focused on long-haul fiber infrastructure, and as of 2026, operates a network of around 15,000 km, across multiple South African provinces and major cities.

== See also ==
- Internet in South Africa
- Telecoms in South Africa
