= SAIL (cable system) =

Submarine communications cable system

SAIL (South Atlantic Inter Link)
- Owners: Camtel, China Unicom
- Landing points: Kribi, Cameroon; Fortaleza, Brazil
- Design capacity: 32 Tbit/s
- Date of first use: Q3 2018 (ready for service)

The South Atlantic Inter Link (SAIL) (formerly referred to as Cameroon-Brazil Cable System, CBCS) is a submarine communications cable in the South Atlantic Ocean linking Kribi, Cameroon with Fortaleza, Brazil.

== Cable ==
SAIL submarine cable project was jointly invested and constructed by China Unicom and Camtel. The cable landing points are operated by Camtel in Kribi and by China Unicom Brazil in Fortaleza. China Unicom provided project management and business operation support, while the engineering construction was contracted from Huawei Marine Networks. The whole project lasted for 14 months and was completed in August 2018.

The cable measures approximately 6,000 km in length and contain four optical fibre pairs, each capable of transmitting 100 wavelengths with a bandwidth of 100 Gbit/s (gigabits per second), for a design capacity of 32 Tbit/s (terabits per second). The project was financed through the Concessional Loan and Preferential Export Buyer’s Credit of China Exim Bank.

SAIL is an intercontinental submarine cable across the South Atlantic sea area, connecting the continent of Africa and South America establishing new Internet channels for Africa-South America, Africa-North America and South America-Europe.

== See also ==
- SAm-1 (South America-1)
- WACS
