= SANReN =

South African internet service provider for research organizations

South African National Research Network
- Abbreviation: SANReN
- Formation: 2005; 20 years ago
- Purpose: National Research and Education Network
- Headquarters: Pretoria, South Africa
- Region served: South Africa
- Parent organization: Council for Scientific and Industrial Research
- Website: www.sanren.ac.za

SANReN (South African National Research Network) is the project to create a new National Research and Education Network in South Africa. However, unlike most other NRENs, SANReN will provide its clients with both connectivity to the world's research networks as well as commodity Internet access.

In 2005, the South African Department of Science and Technology obtained funding from treasury for a ZAR 365 million, three-year project to build a world-class National Research and Education Network to further the country's research aims. The DST then tasked the Meraka Institute with the planning and deployment of this network, to be completed by the middle of 2010.

An initial Request for Information was published in 2005, followed by two Request for Proposals in 2006. The original proposal called for inter-institution links of up to 500Mbit/s and international bandwidth of 1Gbit/s. Due to budget constraints, the implementation of the network proceeded in phases with a prioritisation of institutions, such as the Hartebeesthoek Radio Astronomy Observatory site, that were of specific strategic importance to the South African science initiatives.

The scope of SANReN's network has changed somewhat since the original RFPs were published, with most sites now expecting to connect at speeds of up to 10 Gbit/s. With further phases of the project coming on line, most of the public universities in the country will be included. Originally international Internet connectivity will be provided over the SEACOM submarine fibre cable, in a deal unrelated to the original SANReN RFP. It is expected that SANReN will also take advantage of other cable projects once they come online.

Late in 2007, Meraka announced that it had partnered with the then provider of academic networking in South Africa, TENET. Under their memorandum of understanding, Meraka would build SANReN and TENET would operate it. This arrangement is very similar to the relationship between GÉANT and DANTE in Europe.

As of September 2008, SANReN has connected three higher educational institutes in Gauteng: the University of the Witwatersrand, the University of Johannesburg, the University of Pretoria, the Tshwane University of Technology and the Council for Scientific and Industrial Research (of which Meraka is part).
