= Virgin Mobile South Africa =

Mobile virtual network operator

- Type: Private
- Industry: Telecommunications
- Founded: 2006
- Headquarters: South Africa
- Key people: Zak Van De Merwe
- Products: Prepaid and Contract Mobile Phones
- Number of employees: 400
- Parent: Virgin Group (55%); Calico Investments (45%)
- Website: www.virginmobile.co.za

Virgin Mobile South Africa (VMSA) was a mobile virtual network operator (MVNO) which was launched in 2006 as a joint venture between Sir Richard Branson's Virgin Group and Cell C. Based in Johannesburg, the bustling business-hub of South Africa, Virgin Mobile South Africa has established itself as a dynamic and growing brand with stores nationwide. In February 2011, Cell C sold its stake to Virgin Group and Calico Investments, after which Virgin Group assumed a controlling stake. In November 2020 the company went into voluntary business rescue. In September 2021 their customers were informed that services would be stopped by the end of November 2021, but by 17 September 2021 all services were stopped, leaving many customers stranded.

== Services ==
=== Voice & SMS ===
Virgin Mobile prides itself in being a no-frills brand providing simplicity to its customers. The MVNO offers a prepaid product with a flat voice rate across all networks, at any time of the day and an out of bundle rate of 99c per MB. Virgin Mobile also offers BYO (Bring Your Own) SIM only plans which are available on a month-to-month and 12 month packages.

Virgin Mobile airtime is available in various denominations via the major banks, in retail and petrol stations nationwide as well as online.

=== Internet ===
Virgin Mobile offers users mobile internet via EDGE, 3G, LTE and HSPA+ at the cost of 99c per MB on prepaid. Customers also have the flexibility to load mobile internet bundles, which may significantly reduce this per MB rate.

== See also ==
- Virgin Mobile
