= Vox Telecom =

South African based ISP

Vox
- Vox Logo
- Industry: Telecommunications
- Predecessor: @lantic
- Founded: 1996; 30 years ago
- Founder: Neels Fourie
- Headquarters: Pretoria, South Africa
- Area served: South Africa
- Products: FTTH; LTE; Satellite Internet
- Subsidiaries: YahClick
- Website: Vox Telecom

Vox is a FTTH, LTE and satellite Internet service provider in South Africa.

Vox began as @lantic Telecom and traded locally since 1996 and grew into one of the largest independent service providers in South Africa with a customer base of over 120 000 subscribers.

== History ==
@lantic was founded in January 1996 by Neels Fourie.

In 2005, @lantic acquired by Vox Telecom.

In 2012, @lantic collapsed into the Vox Telecom Group.

In 2022, Vox changed its name to Vivica Group.

== Social investment ==
In partnership with local South African communities, @lantic hosts a sevens rugby series for schools. It is aimed at the development of the youth through sport and with this sport receiving Olympic status from 2016, it acts as a formal pathway for schoolboys to progress to the South African national sevens rugby team. The series offers the opportunity for small rural schools to compete against large urban schools, which is not possible in other competitions.

== See also ==
- Internet in South Africa
