= Herotel =

South African fiber network operator

- Type: Private
- Industry: Broadband
- Founded: 2013; 13 years ago
- Headquarters: Stellenbosch, Western Cape, South Africa
- Area served: South Africa
- Key people: Van Zyl Botha (CEO)
- Products: Fiber internet Wireless internet VoIP
- Parent: Vumatel
- Website: herotel.com

Herotel (stylized as herotel, and previously known as Snowball Effect) is a South African fiber network operator (FNO) and internet service provider (ISP) that provides fiber internet access, wireless internet services, and VoIP services to the South African market.

The company offers services to both consumer and business segments, provides internet access to over 500 cities and towns across South Africa, and has a focus on providing access to remote areas as well as metropolitan ones.

== History ==
Headquartered in Stellenbosch, the business was founded in 2013, by brothers Eugene and Storm van der Merwe in 1998. Initially, herotel offered just web hosting and web development services, but later added internet connectivity to its service suite.

The company's growth was accelerated through the consolidation of 30 owner-operated businesses across South Africa, which now all operate under the herotel banner.

In March 2022, South African fiber network operator (FNO) Vumatel announced that it had acquired a 45%, non-controlling share of herotel, and later increased this share to 49.96%. In August 2022, Vumatel announced its intentions to acquire 100% of herotel, in order to expand its South African fiber infrastructure coverage outside major metropolitan areas.

In May 2025, herotel was South Africa's third-largest FNO, with almost 600,000 homes passed by its infrastructure, and just under 300,000 homes connected to its network. At the same time, it was also South Africa's largest closed-access network, meaning it served as both the FNO and the sole ISP on the network.

In March 2025, Vumatel's complete acquisition of herotel was approved by the South African Competition Commission, with conditions to maintain open access and transparent service terms. The consolidation is set to position Vumatel to extend its fiber network into South Africa's smaller cities and rural areas, enhancing Internet accessibility. Vumatel has pledged to roll out fiber to the home services in low-income areas, aiming to bridge the digital divide.

== Operations ==
The company maintains over 2,000 towers and over 200 fiber points of presence (POPs), across South Africa.

Herotel offers commercial services via its herotel business division, which is based in Menlyn, Pretoria. In addition to similar services provided by its consumer division, Herotel Business offers infrastructure services, including:

- heroFlash (managed, Layer 2 bandwidth connectivity to Teraco data centers)
- Dark Fibre (unmanaged, point-to-point connectivity)
- Co-location (nationwide connectivity, via herotel's tower network and fiber points of presence.

== Other information ==
The company is a founding member of the Wireless Access Provider's Association (WAPA) and operates a wireless network in Cape Town and the broader Western Cape, from where it offers low cost wireless services.

Herotel is also a member of the Internet Service Provider's association of South Africa and holds I-ECNS and I-ECS licenses. In 2007, herotel participated in the ISPA Superteacher sponsorship program.

Herotel owns and operates a data centre in Technopark, a commercial area in Stellenbosch.
