= Internet in South Africa =

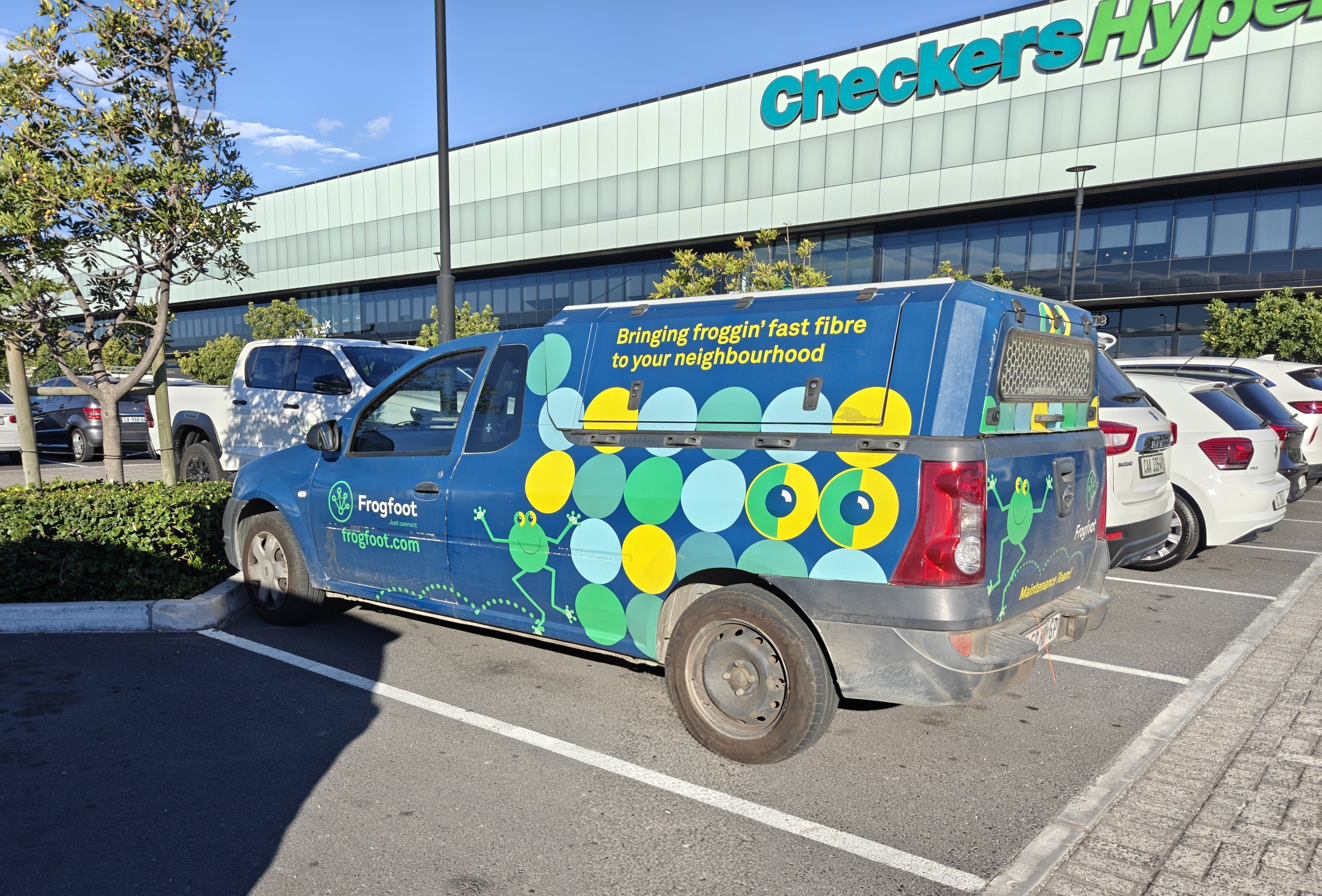
A vehicle from Frogfoot, one of South Africa's major fiber network operators (FNOs), in Cape Town

Internet in South Africa is developed, prevalent, and continuing to advance and expand. SA is one of the most technologically resourced countries on the African continent. The internet country code top-level domain (ccTLD) .za is regulated by the .za Domain Name Authority (.ZADNA) and was granted to South Africa by the Internet Corporation for Assigned Names and Numbers (ICANN) in 1990.

In January 2025, there were 50.8 million internet users in South Africa, constituting 79.6% of the population.

Fibre-to-the-premises (for residential and commercial users) is common throughout major metropolitan areas in the country. There are four major fibre network operators (FNOs) in SA, via which dozens of ISPs offer a wide variety of uncapped internet packages, with speeds ranging from 50 Mbps on the low end to 1 Gbps at the top end.

Satellite internet is an option for those residing in more rural areas. Streaming services are commonly used for content, many companies use the internet to conduct business (or work on an entirely remote basis), and the internet service provider (ISP) landscape is highly competitive, which keeps prices low.

The country has four major cellular providers, as well as numerous MVNOs. 5G mobile connectivity is present across South Africa, and continually expanding.

== History ==
The first South African IP address was granted to Rhodes University in 1988 and on 2 February 1989 the first email in the country was sent from the Rhodes Cyber system at the university, through FidoNet, to Randy Bush in Portland, Oregon.

On 12 November 1991, the first IP connection was made between Rhodes' computing centre and Bush in Oregon. By November 1991, South African universities were connected through UNINET to the Internet. Commercial Internet access for businesses and private use began in June 1992 with the registration of the first .co.za subdomain.

The African National Congress, South Africa's governing political party at the time, registered its website (anc.org.za) in 1997, and later changed it to anc1912.org.za, making it one of the first African political organizations to establish an Internet presence; around the same time, the Freedom Front Plus (Afrikaans: Vryheidsfront Plus) registered vryheidsfront.co.za.

=== The dial-up era ===
Dial-up internet used to be offered by Telkom, which, until 2024, was a state-owned enterprise, given that the majority shareholder was the Government of South Africa. As a result, for many years, Telkom had a monopoly on fixed-line internet across the entire country. Development was slow and infrastructure maintenance was poor.

=== The ADSL and broadband era ===
The first true ADSL solution for consumers launched in 2001, and was branded "Turbo Access". The service was a tender awarded to Africa Data Holdings. Solutions ranged from a basic rate line (2 x 64-kbit/s B channels and one 16-kbit/s D channel). Most home users had a 64 kbit/s Internet connection, utilising the second B Channel for telephony. Larger businesses took advantage of a primary rate ISDN (The T1 line consists of 23 bearer (B) channels and one data (D) channel for control purposes) for common needs, like switchboards and fax solutions.

The ISDN Terminal Adapters were all supplied by Eicon Networks Corporation, which was later bought by Dialogic Corp. This was the very first introduction of "Broadband" into South Africa, and a platform for growth. Utilising ISDN, WAN Africa Data Holdings (later dissolved into the Converge Group) introduced many (at the time) revolutionary solutions like fax; Unified Messaging (email, fax, voicemail); Remote Access Service (RAS); and Voice over IP.

In 2006, the Government of South Africa began prohibiting sites hosted in the country from displaying X18 (explicitly sexual) and XXX content (including child pornography and depictions of violent sexual acts); site owners who refuse to comply are punishable under the Film and Publications Act.

Under the Electronic Communications and Transactions Act of 2002 (ECTA), ISPs are required to respond to and implement take-down notices regarding illegal content such as child pornography, defamatory material, and copyright violations. Members of the Internet Service Providers Association are not liable for third-party content they do not create or select, however, they can lose this protection from liability if they do not respond to take-down requests. ISPs often err on the side of caution by taking down content to avoid litigation since there is no incentive for providers to defend the rights of the original content creator, even if they believe the take-down notice was requested in bad faith. There is no existing appeal mechanism for content creators or providers.

The total number of wireless broadband subscribers overtook that of fixed line broadband subscribers in South Africa during 2007.

Also in 2007, Broadband Infraco (BBI) was established through the Broadband Infraco Act No.33, of 2007, passed by the South African Parliament. Its main goal was to ensure that all communities in South Africa were connected to the internet, with a specific focus on underserved areas.

South Africa's total international bandwidth reached the 10 Gbit/s mark during 2008, and its continued increase is being driven primarily by the uptake of broadband and lowering of tariffs. Three new submarine cable projects have brought more capacity to South Africa from 2009—the SEACOM cable entered service in June 2009, the EASSy cable in July 2010, and the WACS cable in May 2012. Additional international cable systems have been proposed or are under construction (for details see active and proposed cable systems below).

In August 2009, ADSL broadband prices began to drop significantly when major South African ISP Afrihost entered the market with packages priced as low as R29 ($1.96) per gigabyte, resulting in other ISPs lowering their prices. Since then, thanks to more ISPs entering the market, the price for data has decreased – in February 2014, Webafrica started offering ADSL from R1.50 ($0.1) per GB.

In late 2009, Telkom began trialling 8 and 12 Mbit/s ADSL offerings. In August 2010, Telkom officially introduced ADSL at 10 Mbit/s. More than 20,000 4 Mbit/s subscribers were upgraded free of charge. As of October 2018, fixed line DSL speeds on offer ranged between 2 Mbit/s to 40 Mbit/s.

In 2012, there were 1.1 million fixed line broadband subscribers and 12.7 million wireless broadband subscribers.

In September 2012, the Constitutional Court upheld a ruling that prescreening publications (including internet content), as required by the 2009 amendments to the Films and Publications Act of 1996, was an unconstitutional limitation on freedom of expression.

In 2013, the South African Parliament approved SA Connect, the implementation of the country's national broadband policy. Its goal was to ensure broadband connectivity at all 6,135 government facilities, including schools, health facilities, post offices, police stations, and government offices, in the eight rural district municipalities. It also sought to ensure some level of connectivity in all South African communities, with a particular focus on underserved areas.

The rollout is being administered by the State Information Technology Agency (SITA) and Broadband Infraco (BBI), the latter of which is a Tier 1 financer of the WACS African undersea cable system.

In 2022, Phase 2 of SA Connect was approved, with a target of 100% connectivity at the end of the 2026 fiscal year. In 2024, connectivity stood at 78.9%.

=== The fibre era ===
In March 2022, then-Minister of Public Works and Infrastructure, Patricia de Lille, published the government's National Infrastructure Plan 2050. In it, the government set a goal of providing all households in South Africa with a minimum of 50GB of free data per month by the end of the 2025/26 South African financial year (February 2026). No income limitations would be placed on the provision, so all households will be eligible.

Then-Minister of Communications and Digital Technologies, Khumbudzo Ntshavheni, said at the time that data had become a new utility, like water and electricity, and was a necessity for all households. A request for a broadband fund was made to the National Treasury. The same funds will also be used for free data provisions to public Wi-Fi hotspots, specifically for low-income households, and in rural communities across SA.

In October 2025, it was announced that Fibertime, a local low-cost FNO and ISP, had connected 200,000 houses to its fibre-to-the-home (FTTH) service. Fibertime is focused on the lower-income market, and plans to reach 1.8 million houses by April 2028. The company offered a fibre product for as little as R35 a week (equating to R5 a day).

At the time, multiple other FNOs had also connected low-income homes, including Wire-Wire, Ilitha Telecoms, Zing Fibre, and Vumatel. In the same month, having connected 30,000 low-income homes thus far, Vumatel offered its Vuma Key product at R99 per month, making it the cheapest monthly fibre product in South Africa at the time.

On 2 October 2025, the South African government launched the Broadband Infraco Modernised National Broadband Backbone. The modernized backbone is an upgraded, open-access fibre optic network, with the goal of providing faster, more resilient long-distance connectivity across South Africa, and into neighboring countries. Communications Minister Solly Malatsi said the launch would provide a foundation for e-learning, fintech, AI, and e-government. The backbone serves to position South Africa as the tech hub of Africa, give SMMEs a platform to thrive, and ensure every learner and entrepreneur can connect reliably.

The infrastructure serves as the backbone for national and municipal broadband access, aimed at closing the digital divide, stimulating innovation, and enabling economic growth and job creation.

At the time of the launch, it was providing connectivity to 1.8 million households and supported 79 ISPs. Malatsi confirmed that SA Connect had received R710 million over the medium term to drive its expansion. Between April 2023 and March 2025, Broadband Infraco connected 3,401 public Wi-Fi hotspots. Malatsi also confirmed that the program had made significant progress over the preceding 2 years, and that it was expected to reach 5.5 million households by the end of 2026.

In July 2026, it was announced that South Africa would host Google's first African connectivity hub (Digital Exchange Port). The exchange, which will be constructed in the Eastern Cape province, will position SA as a strategic international internet connectivity hub, connecting the country to Australia, via the Umoja undersea cable, and India, via a separate cable.

=== Recent developments ===
In July 2026, Amazon announced it had partnered with South African FNO Herotel to launch the Amazon Leo satellite internet service. At the time, Amazon had 375 production satellites in orbit, and a goal of 1,618 satellites by the end of that same month. Amazon said its highest-end Leo service would offer speeds of up to 1Gpbs. Herotel, the first Amazon Leo distributor in SA, will sell the service as part of a new product line called Evry. As part of the announcement, President Cyril Ramaphosa and Communications Minister Solly Malatsi met with Amazon Chief Global Affairs Officer David Zapolsky.

The announcement followed a long-term stalemate between competing service Starlink and the South African Government. Elon Musk's Starlink has wanted to launch in SA for some years, but hasn't done so due to Musk's disliking of SA's local ownership legislation. South Africa mandates that new and renewing telecoms licensees must be 30% owned by historically disadvantaged groups. Despite Musk's protests against the system, no new laws have come into place to accommodate Starlink, and SA's communications regulator, ICASA, said it would not amend any of its BEE regulations. Thus, Starlink's competitors, through complying with local regulations, have managed to beat it to market.

== Fibre infrastructure ==
South Africa has extensive fibre coverage across its major cities. There are over 15 fibre networks in South Africa, of various sizes. Pricing is not standardized across all networks for the same speeds, and often is not pressured to be, as fibre network operators (FNOs) have exclusive use rights for many neighborhoods, according to permits granted by municipalities.

However, there are many fibre ISPs offering competing packages on those fibre networks, and prices have therefore decreased substantially over a short period of time.

Minimum speeds have increased significantly since South Africa's main fibre roll-out, with many providers now starting packages at 50 Mbps.

Different FNOs have different areas of focus. For instance, Dark Fibre Africa (based in Sandton) focuses on enterprise connectivity across major metropolitan areas, with its 14,000+ kilometer network.

On the other hand, Liquid Intelligent Technologies (headquartered in Cape Town) has Africa's largest independent fibre network, which connects a significant number of African and European countries. The company's network, especially prevalent in Southern and Central Africa, spans over 110,000 kilometers.

Residential fibre continues to expand rapidly. In the first quarter of 2025 alone, the number of homes passed by a group of the largest FNOs in South Africa increased by 6%, and the number of active connections or homes ready to go live increased by 19%.

As of 2026, deployed fibre technology to residential properties in South Africa amongst the country's largest fibre network operators passes around 6.4 million homes. The two largest FNOs are Vumatel, which passes around 2.9 million homes (when including subsidiary Herotel), and Openserve, which passes around 1.4 million homes. Aside from major players in the table below, as of 2025, there are at least 651,000 homes passed by a combination of other FNOs, bringing the total residential fibre network in South Africa up to around 7 million homes.

The extent of major residential fibre networks in South Africa is as follows:

FNO	Parent	Headquarters	Homes passed	Homes connected and/or ready to go live	Connectivity ratio	Data as at
Vumatel	Maziv	Johannesburg	2,339,932	1,032,226	44.11%	2026
Openserve	Telkom	Johannesburg	1,453,810	756,409	52.03%	2025
Herotel	Vumatel	Johannesburg	606,388	273,829	45.16%	2025
MetroFibre	AIIM (controlling shareholding)	Centurion	515,000	175,000	33.98%	2025
Frogfoot	Vivica Group	Cape Town	446,000	187,000	41.93%	2025
Octotel	AIIM (controlling shareholding)	Cape Town	400,000	135,000	33.75%	2025
Fibertime	–	Stellenbosch	251,460	–	–	2025
Zoom Fibre	–	Sandton	191,636	65,100	33.97%	2025
Evotel	CYNK	Sandton	175,000	52,500	30%	2025
Total	–	–	6,379,226 (includes overlapping homes)	2,677,064	41.97% (combined)	–

== Mobile connectivity ==
South Africa has four major cellular providers; Vodacom, Cell C, Telkom, and MTN, all of which are headquartered in the country and have invested heavily in signal infrastructure across SA. Numerous MVNOs operate via the major four networks, including Rain, Mr Price Mobile, Standard Bank Connect, PnP Mobile, Purple Mobile, FNB Connect, and Melon.

The four major providers have continually upgraded their networks as new technologies have launched, shifting from their original 1G and 2G networks towards newer standards. Approximately 99.7% of South Africans have 3G coverage, and around 86% have 4G.

In recent years, 5G rollout has been underway across South Africa, especially in major metropolitan areas. At the end of 2024, around 50% of South Africans had 5G connectivity, with a total of 73% of individuals expected to have access by 2029.

Internet hotspots are ubiquitous in locations such as coffeehouses, supermarkets, shopping centers, hotels, and at tourist attractions. Many hotspots offer internet usage free of charge, though some require registering for an account first.

=== Mobile subscriber figures ===
Subscriber information for South Africa's major mobile network providers is as follows:

Network provider	Parent	Headquarters	Subscribers	Year-over-year Change	Market share	Year-over-year Change	Data as at
Vodacom	Vodafone Group plc (65.1%)	Midrand	46.1 million	▲0.3%	38.37%	▼0.81%	2026
MTN	–	Johannesburg	39.5 million	▼0.7%	32.87%	▼1.74%	2026
Telkom	SA Government (40.52%)	Johannesburg	25.6 million	▲10.8%	21.37%	▲1.61%	2026
Cell C	Blu Label Unlimited (49.47%)	Sandton	8.8 million	▲17.1%	7.39%	▲0.94%	2026
Total	–	–	120 million *	–	100%	–	–

Note: Cell C's subscriber figure excludes wholesale/MVNO subscriber lines. The figures are reported at different financial year-ends and are therefore not strictly contemporaneous. * Figure is larger than the population of South Africa, as individuals are able to have multiple subscriptions with one provider, and subscriptions with different providers simultaneously

With 38.3% market share, Vodacom is the largest mobile network provider by a large margin. It is close to becoming what the South African Competition Commission classes as a "dominant" player (which would occur at 45% market share).

Under the Competition Act No 89, of 1998, a firm is considered "dominant if it has a market share of 45% or has market power, i.e. the ability to control prices, exclude competition or act independently from competitors, customers or suppliers". According to the Commission, being dominant is not in and of itself an issue, however abusing a dominant position is.

== Public Wi-Fi ==
In recent years, certain major cities, such as Cape Town, have been rolling out free, public Wi-Fi. This service is provided by municipally-installed hotspots in locations across the city.

The national government also provides thousands of free public Wi-Fi hotspots across South Africa, via Broadband Infraco installations.

== Streaming media ==
Together, Netflix and Prime Video hold just over half of the streaming service market share in South Africa, as of Q1 2026

Streaming services are a popular means of enjoying content in South Africa, and the uptake of such services on a subscription basis has grown in recent years. As of September 2026, South Africans are able to use, among others, the following streaming services:

- YouTube Premium
- Netflix
- Amazon Prime Video
- Disney+
- DStv Stream
- GuideDoc
- Curiosity Stream
- MUBI

== Statistics ==
Internet connectivity is common throughout South Africa, and especially in its major cities. The Internet user base in South Africa has increased rapidly in recent years (especially during the decade from 2010 through 2020), from 2.4 million (5.35% of the population) in 2000, to 12.3 million (41%) in 2012, and then to 50.8 million (78.9%) in 2025.

Percentage of the South African population using the internet, by year
Year	2000	2001	2002	2003	2004	2005	2006	2007	2008	2009	2010	2011	2012	2013	2014	2015	2016	2017	2018	2019	2020	2021	2022	2023	2024	2025
%	5.35	6.35	6.71	7.01	8.43	7.49	7.61	8.07	8.43	10	24	33.97	41	46.5	49	51.92	54	56.17	62.4	69.7	72.1	75	75.5	75.7	78.4	78.4

== Undersea Fibre Cables ==
Undersea fibre optic cables land at multiple points in South Africa, including Cape Town, Melkbosstrand, Duynefontein, Yzerfontein, Gqeberha, Mtunzini, Umbogintwini, and East London.

The country has numerous active cables connecting it to other continents (directly, and via other countries), as well as multiple planned undersea fibre cables in various stages of development.

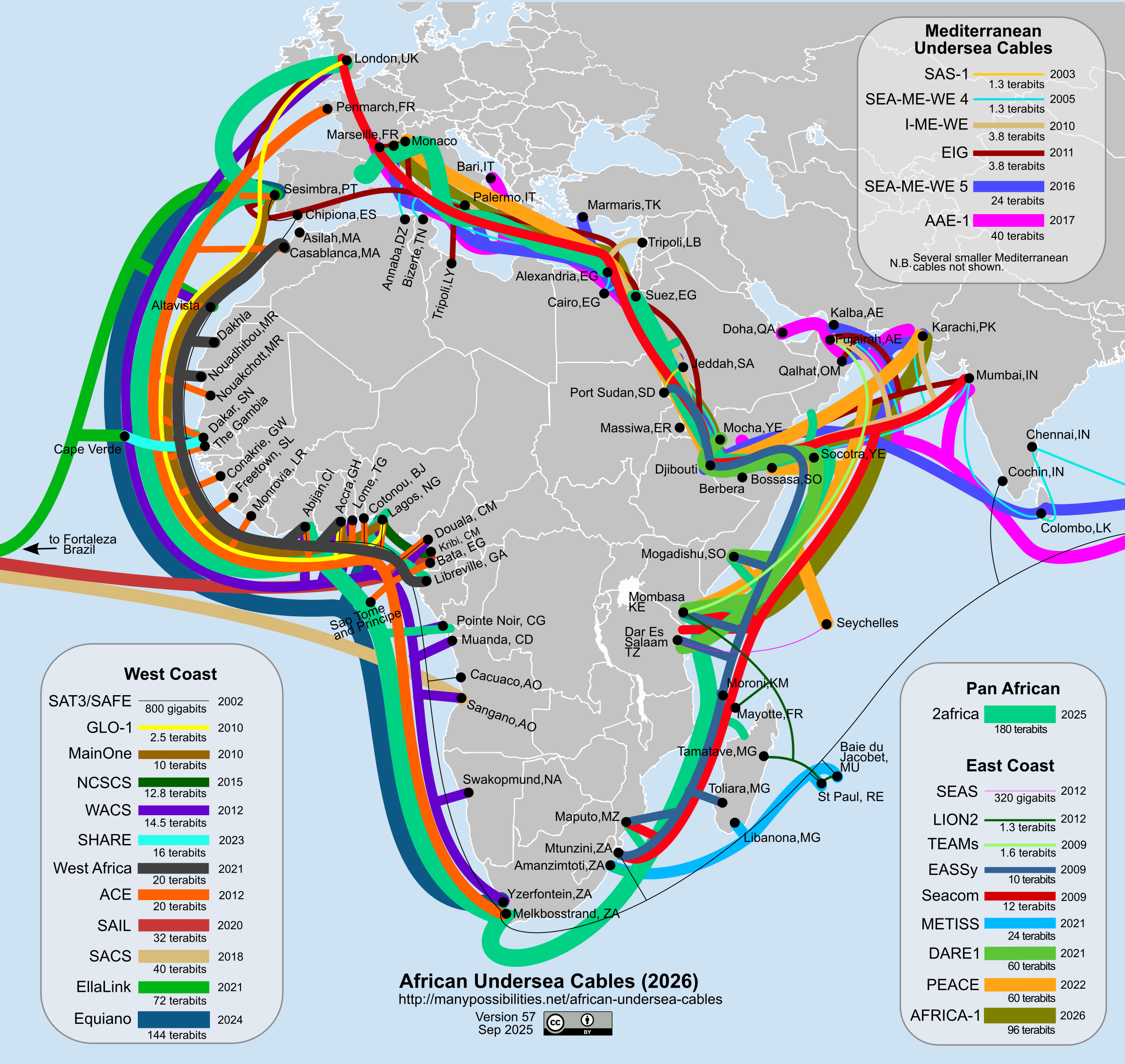
Map of active and planned African undersea fibre optic cables, as of September 2025

=== Active Cables Systems ===
- SAT-3/WASC
- SEACOM
- EASSy
- WACS
- Main One
- ACE
- 2Africa
- SAFE
- Africa-1
- Equiano

=== Proposed Cable Systems ===
The following systems have been proposed or are under construction, but are not yet operational in South Africa:

- BRICS Cable
- WASACE Cable

== University and research access ==
The South African National Research and Education Network (SANReN) provides dedicated bandwidth capacity to more than a 100 university campuses, research institutes, museums and scientific organisations in South Africa. This is the foundation for collaborative research with academics and scientists on the African continent and across continents.

SANReN enables the participation of South African scientists and postgraduate students in global research, such as the high energy physics ATLAS experiment hosted at CERN in Geneva, and will enable global access to the Square Kilometre Array radio astronomy project co-hosted in South Africa and Australia.

== Internet censorship ==
2025 World Press Freedom Index Good: 85–100 points Satisfactory: 70–85 points Problematic: 55–70 points Difficult: 40–55 points Very serious <40 points Not classified

Digital media freedom is respected in South Africa. Political content is not censored in any way, and journalists, bloggers, and other forms of content creators are not targeted for their online activities, and are free to post their views online (as long as they are not tantamount to hate speech). In 2013, Freedom House rated South Africa's "Internet Freedom Status" as "Free".

== Legislation ==
Legislation relating to the internet in South Africa is set by the Department of Communications and Digital Technologies, headed by the Minister of Communications and Digital Technologies, a role currently held by Democratic Alliance member Solly Malatsi. The DCDT is responsible for all South African communications, telecommunications, broadcasting, and postal industry matters.

South Africa participates in regional efforts to combat cybercrime. The East African Community (consisting of Kenya, Tanzania, and Uganda) and the Southern African Development Community (SADC; consisting of Malawi, Mozambique, South Africa, Zambia, and Zimbabwe) have both enacted plans to standardize cybercrime laws throughout their regions.

== See also ==
- Internet in Africa
- Digital Divide in South Africa
- Internet censorship in South Africa
- Telecommunications in South Africa
- National broadband plans from around the world
- List of international submarine communications cables
