= Vumatel =

South African fiber network operator

- Type: Private
- Industry: Fiber internet infrastructure Broadband
- Founded: 2014; 12 years ago
- Headquarters: Johannesburg, South Africa
- Area served: South Africa
- Key people: Dietlof Mare (CEO); Francois Swart (CIO)
- Products: Fiber to the premises
- Revenue: ▲ R4.43 billion (2026)
- Parent: Maziv
- Subsidiaries: Herotel
- Website: vumatel.co.za

Vumatel (officially Vumatel Pty Ltd) is a South African fiber network operator (FNO), providing open-access fiber internet infrastructure throughout South Africa.

Vumatel is South Africa's largest fiber to the home infrastructure provider, with over 2.3 million homes passed and over 1 million homes connected, for an uptake ratio of 44.11% as of 2026.

The company is owned by South African telecoms firm Maziv, which also owns other internet-related companies, including Dark Fibre Africa (DFA).

== History ==
Founded in 2014 by Niel Schoeman and Johan Pretorius, Vumatel was launched in order to bring fiber to the home services to more South Africans. At the time, access to FTTH was uncommon. The first Vumatel services were provided in Parkhurst, Johannesburg, after signing a deal with the Parkhurst Residents Association.

The company's launch prompted existing, large South African telecommunications providers, such as Telkom, MTN, and Vodacom, to enter the fiber to the home market, significantly increasing South Africans' access to fiber internet services in what had long been a market dominated by slow ADSL and VDSL connectivity (monopolized by Telkom), and expensive, capped wireless broadband services.

In 2016, Vantage Capital provided Vumatel with a R250 million investment, in order to accelerate the company's growth. At the time, Vumatel was providing fiber infrastructure to around 4,000 customers, across 14 neighborhoods in Johannesburg.

In 2018, a 34.9% stake in Vumatel was acquired by Community Investment Ventures Holdings (CIVH), which owns other South African telecoms assets, such as DFA, SqwidNet, and SADV, and is itself partially owned by South African investment holding company Remgro). In 2019, CIVH fully acquired Vumatel.

Following restructuring in 2023, Vumatel and Dark Fibre Africa (DFA) became wholly owned subsidiaries of Maziv, a newly-formed company and wholly owned subsidiary of CIVH.

In March 2022, Vumatel announced that it had acquired a 45%, non-controlling share of competing fiber network operator Herotel, and later increased this share to 49.96%. In August 2022, Vumatel announced its intentions to acquire 100% of Herotel, in order to expand its South African fiber infrastructure coverage outside major metropolitan areas. In February 2025, Herotel was South Africa's third-largest FNO, with almost 600,000 homes connected. It was also South Africa's largest closed-access network, meaning it served as both the FNO and the sole ISP.

Vumatel's parent company, Maziv, secured a R25 billion loan from a consortium of lenders, led by South Africa's largest bank - Standard Bank - for fiber expansion projects across the country.

In March 2025, the South African Competition Commission announced that it had advised the Competition Tribunal to approve Vumatel's acquisition of Herotel, with conditions to maintain open access and transparent service terms. The consolidation will position Vumatel to extend its fiber network into South Africa's smaller cities and rural areas, enhancing Internet accessibility. Vumatel has pledged to roll out fiber to the home services in low-income areas, aiming to bridge the digital divide.

Also in March 2025, the South African Competition Tribunal published a ruling comprising over 350 pages, detailing why it had blocked a proposed 30% acquisition of Vumatel's parent company, Maziv, by South African cellular service provider, Vodacom, for R13 billion. The Tribunal stated that any short-term public interest in the deal was temporary, and was outweighed by permanent anti-competitive effects that would ultimately impact millions of South African consumers.

The Tribunal concluded that Maziv's reason for wanting the deal was to prevent a situation in which it competed with Vodacom in the fiber market, if Vodacom was to build out its own infrastructure. The Tribunal further concluded that Vodacom's reason for being in favor of the deal was to prevent a loss of income that it determined would result from households' mobile data spend decreasing if they switched to using fiber internet.

In August 2025, Vodacom's proposed acquisition of a 30% to 34.95% shareholding in Maziv was approved by the South African Competition Appeals Court.

The Court set aside the order of the Tribunal that prohibited the merger. However, as well as retaining existing terms that were proposed, to limit anti-competitiveness in the South African fiber market, additional concessions were agreed upon to limit Vodacom’s influence over Maziv, and expand the former's capital expenditure commitments.

In 2026, Vumatel reported strong revenue growth, increasing by 15.3% year-over-year and totaling R4.43 billion.

== Operations ==
=== Fiber infrastructure ===
Vumatel provides an open-access network, which means it is made available, through leasing, to multiple ISPs. Vumatel only provides the fiber infrastructure, and the fiber internet services are provided by various South African ISPs who decide to partner with Vumatel.

Vumatel installs both trenched (underground) and aerial fiber lines, depending on the permits granted by the cities in which its infrastructure is rolled out. Sometimes, a single road can have a combination of both types of fiber lines. The company then installs fiber link-up boxes on the outside of detached homes and apartment blocks (with apartments using splitter boxes per floor), as well as CPE boxes (ONTs) inside houses and apartments, into which consumers' routers connect via ethernet.

As part of its roll-out, Vumatel explains the benefits of fiber, and advertises its network in partnership with participating ISPs at town hall meetings, wherein questions from residents are answered.

The company's gigabit-capable passive optical network (GPON) comprises fiber to the node cables, which then branch out into smaller, local networks, providing fiber lines to each property. For detached homes, Vumatel installs two 1 Gbps lines (one is active, and one is redundant, in the event of future expansion).

In September 2024, the company launched Vuma Key, South Africa's cheapest-ever 10Mbps FTTH product, in Alexandra, a low-income area in the Gauteng province. The services is intended for households earning a monthly income of less than ~ R5,000. The service roll-out was in line with Vumatel's increased focus on providing fiber infrastructure in low-income areas across South Africa. The company had already been offering its Vuma Reach service, aimed at households earning between ~ R5,000 and ~ R30,000 per month.

In January 2025, it was reported that Vumatel had reached almost 1 million subscribers (active connections). This means that Vumatel has almost as many home fiber customers as Telkom (with its monopoly on ADSL and VDSL services across South Africa) had DSL clients at the peak of the legacy broadband technology's adoption in the country, in early 2016.

In February 2025, reports from the end of the previous year stated that Vumatel's network had passed over 2 million homes, with almost 830,000 connected or ready to go live, giving the company a connectivity ratio of 41.3%.

In September 2026, it was reported that Vumatel had passed over 2.33 million homes, with over 1 million of those connected, resulting in an uptake ratio of 44.11%.

=== Security infrastructure ===
Through its Vumacam initiative, Vumatel has installed a network of over 7,000 public space CCTV security cameras (with its broader network comprising over 18,000 cameras). These are located mostly in Gauteng, however the company has recently begun rolling the network out in the Western Cape as well, which has enabled Vumacam to assist police in tracking suspects across provincial borders.

South African armed response and security service provider, Fidelity ADT, has partnered with Vumatel, gaining its Fidelity command and control centers access to real-time Vumacam feeds, so as to enhance Fidelity ADT's crime prevention abilities. Communities are also able to fund the installation of Fidelity ADT-monitored Vumacams in specific places in their neighborhoods, which link up with patrol cars and armed guards situated in their areas.

The cameras have vehicle license plate tracking abilities, and connect to partners, like the South African Police Service (SAPS) in real-time. The cameras perform an average of 12 million Licence Plate Reads (LPR) per day, flagging approximately 55,000 Vehicles of Interest (VOI) on the Proof Platform daily.

In partnership with the Gauteng Department of e-Government, 193 Vumacam CCTV cameras have been installed in low-income, informal settlements in Gauteng, and, in partnership with Africa Housing Company (Afhco) and Jozi My Jozi, 123 cameras have been installed throughout the Johannesburg Central Business District (CBD). This is part of the City of Johannesburg's technology-driven effort to prevent crime.

The Johannesburg Metropolitan Police Department and South African Police Service have access to Vumacam's network of cameras, to expand their crime prevention capabilities. Over 100 other private control rooms also have access to Vumacam video feeds, creating a backup for public policing.

== Corporate social responsibility ==
Vumatel has provided over 800 schools with free 1 Gbps fiber connections, to provide children in South Africa with the opportunity to connect to online educational platforms, and have increased access to the internet. Started in 2015, the initiative, called the Vuma Schools Project, has thus far provided free internet access to over 450,000 students and teachers.

Vumatel announced that they aimed to connect a further 200 schools in 2025, to bring the total to over 1,000, as part of an effort to expand fiber connectivity to underserved communities.

Between August 2024 and March 2025, Vuma partnered with GirlCode to host over 2,300 students in South Africa for career days, in order to provide them with an introduction to coding, using Scratch, CSS, and HTML. This initiative also serves to address the gender gap in the STEM fields in South Africa.

== Accolades ==
In 2018, Vumatel was the recipient of the South African Venture Capital Association's award for the best medium-sized South African growth champion.
