= Internet Solutions =

African telecommunications company

- Type: Subsidiary
- Founded: 1993
- Headquarters: Johannesburg, South Africa
- Key people: Saki Missaikos (CEO)
- Services: Cloud Computing, Connectivity, Data Centres, Security and Communications
- Parent: Dimension Data
- Website: www.is.co.za

Internet Solutions (IS) is an Internet services provider for public and private sector organisations. It is a wholly owned subsidiary of the Dimension Data Group and part of NTT.

Headquartered in South Africa, IS has operating offices in Mozambique, Uganda, Ghana, Kenya and Nigeria, as well as sales offices in the UK, Singapore and US. IS has six international Points of Presence (PoPs) – in New York, London (2), Germany, Hong Kong, and Singapore, and 65 PoPs across the African continent. The company has over 12,000 m^{2} of data centre space across Africa and is the largest provider of alternate last mile services in South Africa.

Internet Solutions is wholly owned by Dimension Data, with its headquarters in Johannesburg, South Africa. Subsidiaries include Ignite, AlwaysOn, VAST.

== History ==
In 1997, Dimension Data acquired Internet Solutions by purchasing the remaining 75% of the company; previously they had acquired 25% the year before. Ronnie Apteker, one of the founders of Internet Solutions stated that one of the main reasons for selling the company was to enhance the company's ability to deliver to the market and has joined forces with Dimension Data to meet market needs.

In 2013, Internet Solutions provided an uncapped and unshaped 1 Gbit/s internet connection during the rAge 2013 which is the biggest Computer LAN event in South Africa. This was a milestone in South African gaming industry.

In 2014, the company announced that it joined the Alliance for Affordable Internet (A4AI). Additionally, the company acquired ContinuitySA, a provider of business continuity management services to public and private organisations. The terms of the acquisition enabled ContinuitySA to retain their brand and operational autonomy, whilst also maintaining its vendor neutral stance.

In 2015, the company acquired the MWEB Business and Optinet Network Services divisions of MWEB, South Africa's second largest consumer Internet Service Provider.

In December 2016, the company announced that it had entered an agreement with Naspers to acquire MWEB as an entry into the residential consumer Internet market. On 9 May 2017, it was announced that the South African competition authorities approved the proposed acquisition of MWEB with 31 May 2017 being the effective date of the sale.

== See also ==
- Dimension Data
