= Creating shared value =

Concept reinventing business purpose to include social benefit and profit

Creating shared value (CSV) is a business concept first introduced in a 2006 Harvard Business Review article, Strategy & Society: The Link between Competitive Advantage and Corporate Social Responsibility. The concept was further expanded in the January 2011 follow-up piece entitled Creating Shared Value: Redefining Capitalism and the Role of the Corporation in Society. Written by Michael E. Porter, a leading authority on competitive strategy and head of the Institute for Strategy and Competitiveness at Harvard Business School, and Mark R. Kramer, of the Kennedy School at Harvard University and co-founder of FSG, the article provides insights and relevant examples of companies that have developed deep links between their business strategies and corporate social responsibility (CSR). Porter and Kramer define shared value as "the policies and practices that enhance the competitiveness of a company while simultaneously advancing social and economic conditions in the communities in which it operates", while a review published in 2021 defines the concept as "a strategic process through which corporations can turn social problems into business opportunities".

Menghwar and Daood (2021) conducted a comprehensive review published in the International Journal of Management Reviews ranked second best journal in the field of management in year 2022. In this article, they further refine three characteristics of creating shared value and define CSV as "a strategic process through which corporations can solve a social problem which is relevant to its value chain while making economic profits".

The central premise behind creating shared value is that the competitiveness of a company and the health of the communities around it are mutually dependent. Supporters argue that recognizing and capitalizing on these connections between societal and economic progress has the power to unleash the next wave of global growth and to redefine, or even rescue, capitalism.

Critics, on the other hand, argue that "Porter and Kramer basically tell the old story of economic rationality as the one and only tool of smart management, with faith in innovation and growth, and they celebrate a capitalism that now needs to adjust a little bit". One critic regards the CSV concept as a "one-trick pony approach", with little chance that an increasingly critical civil society will buy into such a story.

In 2012, Kramer and Porter, with the help of the global not-for-profit advisory firm FSG, founded the Shared Value Initiative to enhance knowledge sharing and practice surrounding creating shared value globally.

== Mechanism ==
Companies can create shared value opportunities in three ways:

- Reconceiving products and markets – Companies can meet social needs while better serving existing markets, accessing new ones, or lowering costs through innovation
- Redefining productivity in the value chain – Companies can improve the quality, quantity, cost, and reliability of inputs and distribution while they simultaneously act as a steward for essential natural resources and drive economic and social development
- Enabling local cluster development – Companies do not operate in isolation from their surroundings. To compete and thrive, for example, they need reliable local suppliers, a functioning infrastructure of roads and telecommunications, access to talent, and an effective and predictable legal system

Many approaches to CSR put businesses against society, emphasizing the costs and limitations of compliance with externally imposed social and environmental standards. CSV acknowledges tradeoffs between short-term profitability and social or environmental goals, but focuses more on the opportunities for competitive advantage from building a social value proposition into corporate strategy.

== Ecological accounting challenges ==
A significant challenge of CSV resides in accounting for ecological values and costs that are generated within the realm of agricultural production. Up to 90% of the ecological footprint in food processing can be attributed to land management activities outside the control of corporations. An eco commerce model that accounts for ecosystem services at the production unit (farm) level allows "shared value" to emanate from the production unit outward. Centering the shared value at the farm level allows for utilities, biomass processors, food processors, environmental liability insurers, landlords, and governments to participate in the shared value process. This ecocommerce shared value process accounts for and includes positive [environmental] externalities within the economic system.

== Comparison with corporate social responsibility ==
Corporate social responsibility (CSR) differs from Creating Shared Value, although they share the same ground of "doing well by doing good". Mark Kramer, the co-writer of Harvard Business Review article on Creating Shared Value, states in his "Creating Shared Value" blog that the major difference is CSR is about responsibility, whereas CSV is about creating value. Whether it is an extended "new form of CSR" or "shared value", CSV is fundamentally different from the CSR activities of the past.

In a 2013 video for the Huffington Post World Economic Forum, Porter said shared value is a logical progression from CSR because incomes are raised for everyone, not through charity and by being a "good corporate citizen", but by "being a better capitalist – it's a win-win".

CSV is a transition and expansion from the concept of CSR. Business responsibility has evolved from Traditional CSR 1.0 (Stages: Defensive, Charitable, Promotional and Strategic), Transformative CSR 2.0 and to CSR 3.0 what is similar to CSV. Such development of stages by redefining CSR has laid theoretical foundations for companies and society to sustainably and communally overcome societal issues. As capitalism matures, it is companies' duties to break itself out of the traditional CSR by realizing its limitations and try to restructure and pursue new market strategies that value both economic and societal development.

The CSV concept supersedes CSR for it is a way for corporations to sustain in the competitive capitalistic market. Whereas CSR focuses on reputation with placing value in doing good by societal pressure, it generates both economic and societal benefits relative to cost in real competition of maximizing the profits. Instead of being pushed by external factors, CSV is internally generated not confined to financial budget as CSR is. With the advent of CSV and following strong worldwide advocacy for it, companies started to overthink about their vision for their sustainable growth.

Critics, however, argue that Porter and Kramer seem to have "a very particular and limited understanding of CSR, one that neither reflects the academic debates of the past few decades nor captures most of today's CSR practices adequately. (…) Instead of dealing with a contemporary understanding of CSR, corporate social responsibility seems to be used instead as a straw man to rhetorically justify the authors' contribution and its proclaimed originality."

Relational contracting and collaborative business models, including vested outsourcing, have incorporated Porter's and Kramer's shared value principles as the basis for implementing collaborative relationships that creates, shares and expands value for parties in a business or outsourcing relationship.

== Academic literature ==
=== Origins and development of shared value ===
A literature review was conducted into the important early work of 'shared value'. Researchers found some literature focusing on the development of shared value by Porter and Kramer (2006) with most work coming from few sources like the Monitor Group.

More extensively the literature is from development organisations focusing on case studies into the interrelated area of business ventures at the bottom of the pyramid or inclusive business strategies/models.

Outside these case studies, limited literature was found so the paper presented lessons learnt from shared value and interrelated business models to show how they developed and business strategies to engage with the bottom of the pyramid.

The term "shared value" is found in Porter and Kramer's (2006) article, "Strategy and society: the link between competitive advantage and corporate social responsibility" and was a development by Porter of previous thinking on business strategy. This article was the winner of the McKinsey Award for the best Harvard Business Review article in 2006.

From the Corporate Social Responsibility perspective, they observed companies could have worked harder reflecting flaws in CSR that business is pitted against society rather recognising their interdependence; and second, CSR is viewed in a generic sense rather than strategically.

To boost innovation and competitive advantage they say companies need to make CSR part of their core business strategy and researchers saw this as development of Porter's 1985 'Competitive Advantage' work where firms' activities were redefined through their value chains to boost competitive advantage through cost improvements or differentiation.

Their argument that shared value can do both contrasts with Milton Friedman's view that the social responsibility of business is to increase its profits.

Social value activities can overlap with traditional CSR. Efforts to promote sustainability through CSR may cut costs for the company and boost profitability, CSR and core business processes can become indistinguishable from one another, moving to what the authors' term "corporate social integration." By drawing attention to the way society impinges on business (rather than only business on society) it provides justification for solving society's problems as a core business strategy.

Porter and Kramer (2002) "The Competitive Advantage of Corporate Philanthropy", seeks to address the tension of addressing the demand for greater levels of CSR with the demand for short term profits focusing on how a society's 'competitive context' impacts business arguing it is possible to see long term economic and social goals as connected.

=== Creating shared value ===
The researchers found shared value has not greatly progressed, with subsequent literature focused on the types of models and activities that businesses are undertaking to create shared value.

They claim a slight development was Porter and Kramer's 2011 attempt to broaden the concept of shared value beyond the arena of corporate social responsibility with a greater focus on the nature of capitalism and markets, noting dislocations with current capitalism, emphasising the inherent social nature of markets, and suggesting that by adopting shared value principles business and society will be reconnected creating new innovation and socially imbued capitalism.

Whilst it can be argued that capitalism would certainly change if businesses en masse re-orientated their core frameworks to focus on shared value, there is little analysis on how this would occur. The authors themselves recognise this.

Through innovation in new technologies, operating methods, and management approaches a firm can improve society while increasing their productivity and profitability. Porter and Kramer identify GE, Google, IBM and Unilever as having adopted shared value principles but note that "our recognition of the transformative power of shared value is still in its genesis", and argue that addressing social constraints does not necessarily raise internal costs for firms. In a 2013 article, Pfitzer et al. add Dow Chemicals, Nestlé, Novartis, Mars and Intel to their "Who's Creating Shared Value" list. They cite, for example, a "cross-sector coalition" in Ivory Coast supported by Mars, which was established to "avoid looming cocoa shortages".

To create shared value companies should:-

- Reconceive products and markets to provide appropriate services and meet unmet needs. For example, the provision of low-cost cell phones developed new market opportunities as well as new services for people living in poverty.
- Redefine productivity in the value chain to mitigate risks and boost productivity. For example, in reducing excess packing in product distribution reducing cost and environmental degradation.
- Enable local cluster development by improving the external framework that supports the company's operations, for example by developing the skills of suppliers.

==== The business perspective ====
The researchers found little evidence of an overall business perspective on the shared value framework, not surprising given the relatively newness of the concept as firms may have been pursuing shared value practices without it being realised as such, especially outside of the US and it was not clear how to measure if a business is pursuing shared value as opposed to overlapping areas of CSR or philanthropic activities. Counterfactuals of non SV approaches in case studies were not offered and tools and strategies to integrate, operationalise and measure shared value are only now being developed.

They found authors that have promoted shared value provide case studies from US based Multinational Corporations (MNCs) that are explicitly pursuing shared value principles and that resource flows could be significant as GE are investing $6bn to improve health-care access through there 'Healthymagination' programme. They found little analysis as to how much this represents of total GE investment or how shared value investment in a sector compares with nonshared value- investment.

The researchers claim Multi National Corporation motivations are mixed with some highlighting climate change and others a desire for employees to have better links with local communities.

They found little documentation outside success stories of influence elsewhere. Porter noted in "Measuring shared value; how to unlock value by linking social and Business Results" that without clear evidence of the impact of the shared value proposition (and tools to measure it) it will be difficult to attract investors.

The researchers propose that shared value may have added to the wider discourse that views the private sector as key for development and profitable business models as consistent with enhancing social impact but make clear that they do not mean that shared value directly influenced the more established interest in inclusive business, with few of the initial inclusive business papers discussing shared value concepts in any detail. They say a more direct influence, consistent with moves in inclusive business, is companies pursuing shared value developed new types of relationships with other organisations like NGOs.

==== Shared value and the bottom of the pyramid ====
Much focus has been on the application of shared value at the bottom of the pyramid reflecting both greater social needs among this group and the new markets they offer.

The researchers mention Porter and Kramer's example of Hindustan Unilever's innovation in hygiene products distribution, using smaller package sizes, creating new business opportunities and appropriate products for the poor, a classic the bottom of the pyramid model. They also mention Prahalad and Hart's "The Fortune at the Bottom of the Pyramid" paper which sets out how attractive the bottom of the pyramid is for MNCs with commercial and social opportunities through mutual value creation by reorientating their core business to provide products for these consumers.

The researchers claim this thesis challenged assumptions that business success and creating social value was not possible at the lower end of the market.

==== Inclusive business models ====
Direct links between shared value and the bottom of the pyramid were further brought together in a 2007 conference titled "The role of the private sector in expanding economic opportunity through collaborative action" hosted by Harvard CSR Initiative, FSG Social Impact Advisors, and the IFC focusing on how companies could improve livelihoods of the bottom of the pyramid through both new services and new markets.

Two complementary frameworks companies were using promoting shared value were examined by the researchers:

- "inclusive business models" which aim to directly involve the poor in their value chains
- "complementary strategies" that aim to enhance the overall environment for such models to flourish, for example by shaping public policy or up-skilling workers.

The researchers used the 2008 UNDP definition "create value by providing products and services to or sourcing from the poor, including the earned income strategies of non-governmental organisations" to describe 'Inclusive business models' as an umbrella term for a range of models.

They show the UNDP paper (2008) "Creating Value for All: Strategies for Doing Business with the Poor" which examines over 50 inclusive business ventures and the partnership between World Business Council for Sustainable Development (WBCSD) and SNV (2008) which developed the concept in Latin America, captured in "Inclusive Business - profitable business for successful development".

They found whilst inclusive business is closely related to shared value in that both highlight profits motives as being compatible with "doing good", its origins are less centred in CSR strategies, and that Caroline Ashley in her 2009 paper that as the shared value concept moved CSR to be more grounded in business strategy and inclusive business moved sustainable business terminology towards a more profit and less ethical framework.

Within inclusive business there is also less of a focus on gaining competitive advantage through social impact (although that is still one of the potential benefits) with the overriding feature that marries profit with development impact. Inclusive business models can be found in a wide variety of companies, while shared value literature has so tended to be focused on MNCs, and as noted in relation to Hindustan Unilever, a number of business models could be described as consistent with shared value and inclusive business.

=== Application of inclusive business models ===
==== The landscape of inclusive business ====
This section provides an insight into both practical development and the types of business strategies being pursued. The researchers of the literature review into shared value found no single framework for shared value or inclusive business models. They found Davis commenting in 2012 about how the corporate sector is highly non-uniform and Caroline Ashley's 2009 paper, "Harnessing core business for development impact" illustrating four inclusive business models with different value propositions and the variation in size of inclusive business models:

- Group A consists of commercial businesses that sell products needed by the poor which possess a high development impact, such as financial services.
- Group B are companies that impact the poor in the normal course of their activities but take deliberate action to expand and improve this impact, for example, mining companies that improve their local value chains.
- Group C captures SMEs that are embedded in the local economy and therefore dependent on its development.
- Group D companies are enterprises that focus on a social product but with a commercial model of delivery.

The researchers found that while much of the literature on shared value concentrates on MNCs, the focus in developing countries is on a range of different company types.

==== Applying inclusive business models to the bottom of the pyramid ====
The researchers identified a number of constraints for companies attempting to create shared value. They found the IFC presenting the results of a survey analysing the obstacles to companies wishing to incorporate inclusive business models in their value chains. Around 90% of the 167 applicants identified access to finance as one of the main obstacles to their business.

They found other major obstacles included poor infrastructure and lack of qualified labour with the UNDP also identifying further obstacles including a hard-to-reach customer base, suppliers with limited capabilities, limited market information and inadequate regulation.

As inclusive business model products are often entering new markets they tend to be push based requiring high levels of awareness-building and education, unlike pull categories that customers already desire, like low cost cell phones.

They found Lucci's 2012 paper "Post-2015 Millennium Development Goals: What role for business?" identifying two dominant core business models pursued at the bottom of the pyramid: "harnessing innovation capacity" and "leveraging supply chains and the production process".

The first can in part be viewed as the earlier framework of inclusive business models, which aimed to target low-income consumers through product innovation, such as the example mentioned above of Hindustan Unilever marketing products in more appropriate packaging which relied on a high return of capital employed, often through shared access services, and a low cost, high volume strategy.

In contrast, they found a 2012 business review paper by Simanis, who argued there was a flaw in this low-price, low-margin, high-volume strategy that MNCs have adopted and only works if two characteristics exist: the ability to leverage existing infrastructure that already serves wealthier customers; and consumers already know how to buy and use the product offering. They found Simanis theorised these characteristics were often missing with him concluding that "because the high costs of doing business among the very poor demand a high contribution per transaction, companies must embrace the reality that high margins aren't just a top-of-the-pyramid phenomenon; they're also a necessity for ensuring sustainable businesses at the bottom of the pyramid."

Simanis's three solutions for generating higher values are

- a localised base product with final processing prior to sale as close to the target market as possible, saving on labour costs;
- offering an enabling service to improve the value of the service offered;
- and to cultivate customer peer groups to drive up aggregate demand.

These received criticism in Karnani's 2007 paper which suggests that costs to serve the poor are still too high and the bottom of the pyramid will not be reached. The researchers found consistencies with an IFC report that a number of its successful models were 'whole pyramid' models, with the 'bottom of the pyramid' segments part of a broader market, allowing companies to leverage existing infrastructure, achieve economies of scale, cross subsidise and manage risk.

Karnani (2007) also argued that as the poor often make choices that are not in their own self-interest like the use of whitening cream in developing countries, consumer-led models that develop new product options may be inappropriate with much of the current discussion around consumer protection and over-indebtedness in microfinance

Karnanis paper also criticises the focus on MNCs in exploiting opportunities at the bottom of the pyramid given the greater development impact that SMEs could potentially have and he argues that inclusive business models frameworks should see the poor primarily as producers rather than as consumers.

London et al. analysed the specific constraints producers face: on value creation that relate to a producer's ability to access affordable and high-quality raw material, financial, and production resources; and on value capture that relate to a producer's ability to access the marketplace, assert market power, and obtain secure and consistent transactions.

The researchers thought London et al.'s focus on producers similar to the broader development of inclusive business models incorporated by UNDP (2008) and in Porter and Kramer with a greater focus on value chain development as opposed to product innovation. Lucci' second major category and she provides the example of SABMiller encouraging the local production of sorghum in Uganda to replace more expensive imports of barley, developing local production alongside more affordable raw materials for their breweries.

Within these broad categories there are a huge range of specific models that companies have adopted. An IFC publication identifies a range of model types which include:-

- "micro distribution and retail" which leverages existing retail outlets in neighbourhoods where consumers make small, frequent purchases locally, like telecommunication companies selling airtime;
- "experience-based customer credit" provided by non-financial firms mostly to their own employees, providing access to finance and to the provider companies.
- "last-mile grid utilities" through a combination of financing, technology and management innovations, mitigate normal constraints extend grid coverage to more distant and often lower-income neighbourhoods;
- "smallholder procurement" value chain upgrades through aggregation methods;
- "value for money housing" through a combination of facilitating mortgage financial and new housing products which are appropriate to the poor including support services, such as understanding training in the mortgage process; and
- "e-transaction platforms" which can bring a range of new services (and therefore new markets) more conveniently and securely to the poor."

==== Inclusive business (and shared value) ecosystems ====
The researchers wrote that an emerging development in these models consistent across the inclusive business and shared value literature is the types of partnerships that they may involve between companies and other actors.

They found companies need often to enter into broader partnerships to leverage local knowledge or scale up interventions. Lucci highlights two examples of this:

- the Southern Agricultural Growth Corridor of Tanzania (SAGCOT) where governments and donors commit to investing in infrastructure to incentivise agricultural business
- longer term platforms that seek to recreate market mechanisms in research and development, such as work by the GAVI Alliance in health vaccines.

They found Davis arguing that the state and corporate sector need a "genuinely symbiotic relationship" which recognises the potential developmental activity that companies undertake as core operations, noting however that this rarely exists.

An emerging development that builds on this is captured in a joint collaboration between the IFC and Harvard's CSR Initiative "Tackling Barriers to Scale: From Inclusive Business Models to Inclusive Business Ecosystems" who suggest that despite some successes, given the levels of investment, inclusive business models record is limited and there are systemic barriers to scale that can only be tackled in collaboration with other players in the private sector, in government and in civil society.

This can be achieved by strengthening 'inclusive business ecosystems' through "strategically engaging the networks of interconnected, interdependent players whose actions determine whether or not their inclusive business models will succeed." This move of focus away from the firm level, similar to market development approaches, such as Making Markets Work for the Poor (M4P).

They conclude the initial stage of the research by identifying that a number of strategies companies have used to strengthen these eco-systems including the bottom of the pyramid awareness-raising and capacity building within the company, research, information-sharing and public policy dialogue.

=== Lessons learned ===
==== Measurement and impact ====
Researchers found little rigorous analysis into the impact of shared value mechanisms, with the majority of evidence existing as standalone case studies of mixed analytical rigour. As documented above, many of these are highly positive stories combining evidence of increased revenue growth with first hand stories of social impact and found it was difficult to find a comprehensive and rigorous study into their overall impact. says that feel-good stories aside, it's been nearly impossible to gauge the success of these ventures." And this further complicated in relation to inclusive business models by the variety of business cases for companies operating at the bottom of the pyramid

They found London also arguing that the predominant focus in terms of social impact is on income, missing wider social dimensions and ignoring potential negatives like undesirable products becoming more accessible and proposed this as less of the case for inclusive business models, often supported by development agencies that have more experience with the wider dynamics of social impact at the bottom of the pyramid. All current measurement models suffer from standard impact challenges, with the emphasis on tasks completed or products distributed rather than outcomes.

They say there is little attempt to fully attribute a company's impact through the use of counterfactuals and recommend Wach for a description of current methods used.

Establishing attribution to a specific company's intervention is made more difficult given the growing emphasis on partnerships that the bottom of the pyramid approaches entail. As the researchers commentary shows, most of the impact discussion to date has been focused on the contribution of companies to enhancing development.

They call for future research to go a step further and attempt to establish the linkages between pursuing core business model and the subsequent impact on both business and social indicators for example, compared to a counterfactual of a non-core business approach.

Porter et al. discuss the problems of current measurement tools that measure business and social impact separately and provides guidance in how to link social benefit to core indicators.

The creation of shared value is not usually systematically planned through a framework. However, in SYRCS methodology, by using shared value criteria in decision making and using different stakeholders, an step by step framework is provided.

==== Successful strategies ====
Notwithstanding the limitations in the evidence base there have been a number of reports that have sought to capture and synthesise lessons from successful shared value and inclusive business ventures. In an extensive report looking into various aspects of inclusive business models, Gradl and Knobloch document a range of benefits for business, in particular access to new markets, in terms of access to new consumers and producers and through the potential for cheaper and higher quality production based on growth-intensive sales and the development of new products.

They found that enhanced reputation may also lead to enhanced partnerships from customers, suppliers and governments UNDP. An IFC report into the impact of their portfolio of inclusive business models, found that revenue growth had been the main business outcome for business, whereas development outcomes included expanded economic opportunities for suppliers, distributors and retailers and access to goods and services

They found factors which led to successful models included, adaption of products and processes that leveraged networks and to reach significant numbers of low-income consumers; models designed to be appropriate with low-income groups' cash management strategies, also leveraging social networks of the poor; capacity building of suppliers, distributors and retailers and collaborations with other organisations (NGOs, development organisation, social enterprises) to leverage knowledge and infrastructure. UNDP (2008) also highlight that business have had to remove market constraints that would more normally be the province of government, for example by investing in education, energy supply and infrastructure. This is consistent with Porter and Kramer (2006) view on competitive context.

They found Hills, et al. mention a number of external conditions were also identified that successful shared value companies had been able to leverage, including governments' openness to private sector participation in socio-economic development and/or the availability of external funding.

- Indian government support of ICICI Lombard's weather-based insurance and microfinance providers (through priority lending mechanisms),
- DFID's support of Vodafone in developing M-PESA.

Strong partners are also important, either through civil society organisations that provide insights into local needs or other companies that share similar philosophies, for example distributors who may also need to adapt their business model. The level of penetration in ICT can significantly lower transactions costs and link informal economies to more established markets.

They found Hills et al. identify two key areas that are essential for successful create shared value companies, "intentionality" and "materiality." Intentionality requires a company or business unit to set specific goals for intended social and financial benefits with clear guidelines that can guide resource allocation decisions along the way and recommend looking at Gradl and Jenkins. A number of company factors are identified that help successful implementation, these include: a culture of innovation that allows experimentation, together with a long term outlook; senior management embracing shared value principles; cross department buy in; and strong local buy in at a local level like affiliates in developing countries. They also stress the importance of building local knowledge through developing local structures and/or strong local partners and employing multidisciplinary teams that are open to new ideas

The concluded by saying that materiality is important as it incentivises management to support CSV. It represents the extent to which creating shared value is central to the financial performance of a business unit or company and as materiality grows strategies are likely to be scaled up.

== Shared Value Initiative ==
The Shared Value Initiative (SVI) was created in the fall of 2012 with a commitment to action at the Clinton Global Initiative. The SVI serves as a global knowledge and learning hub for companies and other stakeholders in SV strategies of practice. The establishment of the SVI capitalizes on global momentum surrounding Shared Value by driving new adoption of SV strategies amongst companies while also improving the implementation of SV strategies that have already been put into practice. The SVI engages in four major activities – deepening and documenting knowledge, creating toolkits for implementation, building communities of practice via both physical and virtual engagement opportunities, and serving as a general steward of the concept of Share Value. The founders of SVI have committed to developing the following capacities within the first two years of the initiative: developing and interactive communications platform, developing shared value content and events, and conducting outreach to a wide range of stakeholders by identifying and developing outreach plans for stakeholders critical to shared value adoption and implementation.

The SVI is managed and staffed by the global social impact consulting firm FSG. Current SVI programs include shared value executive education, an affiliate program that trains consulting firms on the implementation of SV strategies, an online community portal, and a variety of shared value resources. The SVI also hosts the Global Shared Value Summit, an annual three-day gathering of over 200 leaders from the business, public, and not-for-profit sectors citation.

== Criticism ==
The CSV concept started from 2002 and in this article, they hinted the application of Porter's diamond mode. Despite CSV theory is related to the diamond mode which has four endogenous variables, Porter and Kramer (2011) presented three distinctive steps to CSV; (1) reconceiving products and markets, (2) redefining productivity in the value chain, and (3) enabling local cluster development.

The Economist referred to CSV as 'undercooked' without much empirical evidence, noting that CSV's efforts to get corporations to look beyond the bottom line are not new. Also pointed out is the "striking resemblance" of shared value to Jed Emerson's concept of blended value. Finally, The Economist questions whether CSV is "merely a pious hope" without any tangible improvement on the current way of doing business. A common criticism of CSV is the downplay of trade offs that businesses have to make.

Thomas Beschorner regards the CSV concept, based on "several terminological and conceptual misunderstandings", as a "one-trick pony approach" with little chance that an increasingly critical civil society will buy into such a story. Henning Meyer criticises use of the concept and sets out to extend it, noting that although ostensibly it concerns shared value, its focus is on internal business practices without assessing the social nature of businesses and markets, and it does not show how the pursuit of social value can be put into practice outside the individual firm.

== See also ==
- Competitive advantage
- Corporate social responsibility
- Eco commerce
- Fair chain
- Social responsibility
- Value (economics)

== Resources/Links ==
- Shared Value Initiative
- sharedvalue.org.au
- About Michael E. Porter, HBS
- About Mark Kramer, FSG
- About Marc Pfitzer, FSG
- Nestlé, on creating shared value
- Institute for Strategy and Competitiveness at Harvard Business School
- Nestlé Creating Shared Value blog
- Research Center on Shared Value
- Menghwar, P. S. and Daood, A. (2021). Creating shared value: A systematic review, synthesis and integrative perspective. International Journal of Management Reviews, 23(4), 466-485.
