= Fundación Pro Vivienda Social =

Non-profit organization

Fundación Pro Vivienda Social (FPVS) is a non-profit organization created in 1992 by a group of businessmen concerned with values of community solidarity and social responsibility. The foundation's primary mission is to alleviate problems associated with poverty by improving housing and living conditions in low-income districts: the “bottom of the pyramid.” FPVS's projects involve primarily microfinance and infrastructure development.

Based in the Buenos Aires Province of Argentina, FPVS focuses its efforts in the northwestern sector of the greater Buenos Aires metropolitan area and currently has projects in the districts of José C. Paz, Malvinas Argentinas, Merlo, Moreno, and San Miguel.

A large proportion of the neighborhoods in these outer, second and third "belts" of Buenos Aires suffer from high levels of poverty. Within this area of approximately 1,650,000 people (as of 2001), 64% live below Argentina's poverty level. In general, this population lacks urban infrastructure (sidewalks, paved roads, drainage systems), has little access to utilities (gas, water, electricity), and experiences high levels of health problems associated with poor living conditions. Although there is a high demand for goods and services within this area, there is a general lack of companies willing to do business there because of the perceived investment risks. Similarly, many of these families find it difficult to acquire credit in formal markets. As a result, it is extremely difficult for the poor in Buenos Aires to improve their quality of life on their own.

Within this context, FPVS works to ameliorate the discrepancy between supply and demand in poor areas. FPVS's strategies focus on creating incentives for private businesses to invest in poor communities and helping the local population borrow money so that they can afford to purchase necessary goods and services.

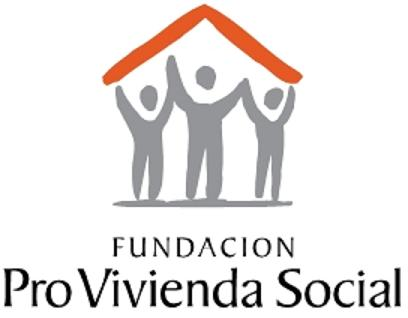

== Current projects ==
=== Microcredit Program: "El Solidarios" ===
The Solidarios project aims to provide microcredit for housing improvements to low income families who are excluded from the formal credit market due to being profiled as “high risk.” The project lends to groups of families, who indemnify one another's loans, at comparatively low interest rates. This strengthens the solidarity between families as well as each individual family's capability to improve their standard of living. To date, the Solidarios project has provided more than 8,500 families with the credit needed to make improvements to the infrastructure of their homes.

=== Integral Gasification ===
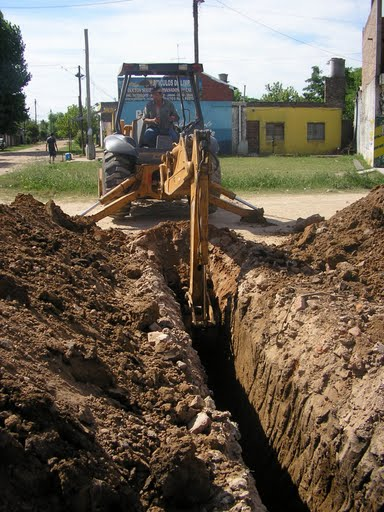

The foundation's gasification projects were created as a result of a 1999 study undertaken to assess basic needs of families living in the Moreno district of Greater Buenos Aires. Many of the neighborhoods in this area lack natural gas connections and rely on propane cylinders for cooking and heating in the home. The use of cylinders is not only inconvenient, but also costs substantially more than would an in-home gas connection.

Since 2000, the foundation has worked with local community associations to bring gas lines to their neighborhoods by providing loans for the up-front construction costs of gas infrastructure. This project is supported by a trust fund financed by FONCAP and the World Bank and administered by FPVS with the help of community partners. These loans are repaid from the savings generated by switching from cylinder to in-home connections.

With a net investment of US$1,720,000, the program benefits around 3,600 families. This investment has allowed for the creation of 70,000 meters of external piping and 2,600 internal home connections in four years. Savings from fuel substitution have cut costs by a factor of four, as each neighbor now spends approximately US$45 as opposed to US$200 on gas per year. After the initial investments are repaid, this saving has a direct impact on family budgets. It is estimated that the savings generated will increase real incomes in the neighborhood by a full seven percent. The project also has an important impact on health and wellness by decreasing respiratory diseases and increasing the quality of cooked food.

=== Bathroom and Kitchen Improvement ===
The Bathroom and Kitchen Improvement project is the product of an alliance between FPVS and Ferrum F.V., Argentina's leading provider of kitchen and bath accessories. This partnership with private business is a model of an inclusive business and serves to provide materials and technical support to poor communities for improvements to bathrooms, kitchens, and laundry facilities, including modules to bring access to water into their homes.

=== Neighborhood Development Observatory ===
The Observatory initiative began in 2006 with the help of a local university, Universidad Torcuato Di Tella, and allows FPVS to measure the impact of its projects on socioeconomic factors such as housing configuration, occupation, health, education, income, consumption, diet, security, social characteristics, and living conditions. The survey helps identify the priorities of the residents and provides useful information about these populations to the private and public sectors. This information also allows FPVS to identify successful strategies that can be used in other locations.

== Future Projects ==
=== Local Development ===
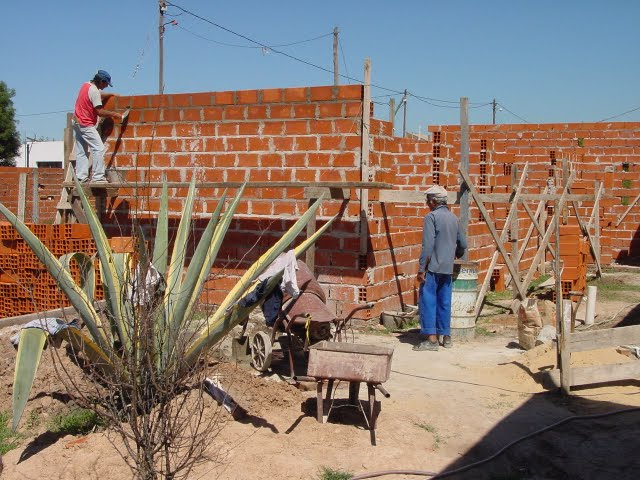

The "Local Development" project will take place in the Cruce Derqui area on the periphery of northeastern Buenos Aires. The project's primary goal is to improve the quality of the local infrastructure and increase the availability of public services. Because the demographics of this area are similar to those in other needy neighborhoods in Buenos Aires, FPVS hopes that the Cruce Derequi project can be used as a model of local development that can be replicated in other areas.

=== Water Networks ===
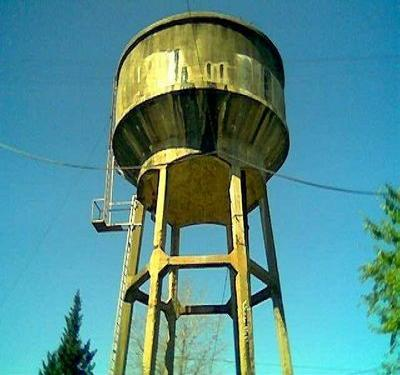

The "Water Networks" project seeks to address the widespread lack of clean drinking water and adequate sewage disposal in the second belt of Buenos Aires. FPVS aims to expand and improve the water infrastructure and sewer networks in the Cuartel V district (with a pilot project involving approximately 750 homes), with the intention that it will be replicated in similar areas. FPVS hopes that this will greatly improve sanitation and the long-term health of the residents. The project is also designed to create a capacity in the community to organize around common problems and work towards solutions together.

The project's main components will be: (1) utilization of inter-sector financing for the construction of the water purification network; (2) training programs for community leaders about environmental sustainability; and (3) systematized monitoring efforts to measure the impact of the program and to replicate its model in other areas.

This project is innovative because it aims to solve community problems by articulating the supply and demand in such a way as to guarantee the sustainability of the program in the long run. Traditionally, water development projects have paid little attention to the economic and social realities of the beneficiaries of the service. Most projects have also failed to strengthen community ties in the development process, and consequently, many development efforts have proved to be unsustainable. This project, in contrast, will be developed in close cooperation with the community.

Another innovative aspect of the project lies in its potential use Certified Emission Reduction credits. Preliminary studies suggest that the Alem water project may result in a reduction of greenhouse gas emissions via improvements in sewage treatment. If these reductions can be realized, FPVS will seek to partly finance the project by selling its reduction credits through the Kyoto Protocol’s Clean Development Mechanism. This will not only provide an important source of financing but will benefit the local environment as well.

=== Training and Education ===
The objective of this project is to create a forum where the local development processes used by FPVS can be organized and disseminated. To this end, the "Training and Education" project will create a Community Leaders Training Center. The center will bring together different community resources in a collaborative environment. The center will thus serve as place where problems facing the community can be discussed and analyzed. FPVS hopes that the center will integrate existing community resources and put them to use in improving living conditions and catalyzing necessary social developments.

=== Program of Ownership Formalization ===
It is an unfortunate reality in Buenos Aires that many poor people are unable to fully realize their property rights because of irregularities in the chain of their home's title. This not only impedes subsequent land transfers but also prevents poor people from using their homes as collateral for much-needed loans. Nearly 70% of the poor families in the Greater Buenos Aires area lack adequate legal titles to their homes because final mortgage payments are frequently not accompanied by a proper deed. Most often, the organizations responsible for granting deeds often go bankrupt or stop operating for other reasons.

The "Ownership Formalization" project is designed to address this problem by assisting poor people in asserting their rights granted by Law 24.374. This statute allows persons who can prove public, peaceful, and continuous use of a residence for a period of three years prior to January 1, 1992, to request to take formal title to their property through a declaration of law. The law thus allows families currently without title to formalize their ownership. FPVS will work to increase awareness of the law and will provide assistance in filling out the necessary paperwork.

== Impact ==
Following the implementation of the first gas project, nearly 3,000 families in the Moreno district of Greater Buenos Aires now have in-home gas connections, 1,000 of which have already finished repayment to the trust fund. The community members who acted as leaders and promoters for the project have formed a formal public services cooperative in order to independently continue improving their neighborhood. The gas company that decided to collaborate, Gas Natural Ban, has changed its perception of the poorest economic sectors as “high risk” into one of viable clients, thus incorporating an inclusive business model.

The microcredit program for housing improvements has reached over 8,000 families in 5 years with an investment of US$12 million.

== Awards ==
FPVS has been the recipient of numerous awards for its work including:

- Development Marketplace Award from the World Bank in 2002
- Banking on Social Change Award from Ashoka in 2008
- Microfinance, Innovation, and Sustainability Award from the Giordano Dell'Amore Foundation in 2009
- Leveraging Business for Social Change Award from the Ashoka Organization in 2010

== Fundraising ==
FPVS receives financial support from a number of different sources including (1) contributions from local and international philanthropies, (2) public resources to support specific projects, (3) low interest loans from banks oriented towards social investment, (4) donations from individuals, and (5) internal resources.

In addition, FPVS has formed alliances with private businesses who provide technical expertise, below-market products and services, and financial support. Some of the primary supporters in the private sector are Gas Natural BAN, FERRUM/FV, the Ford Foundation, the Inter-American Foundation, and Supervielle Banco.

Aside from business sponsors, FPVS receives significant support from individuals. The fund accepts monetary donations online as well as material donations such as office equipment.

== Volunteer Program ==
FPVS has a large and well established volunteer internship program. Internships are intended primarily for international visitors and students in Buenos Aires who wish to contribute their abilities to further FPVS's work. Interns work in the downtown Buenos Aires office in any of the following departments: Institutional Relations; Investigation and Development; and Monitoring, Systematization and Transference. There are also volunteer opportunities in the Moreno office. In general, volunteers will need at least a basic knowledge of Spanish and must commit to a term of at least 3 months.
