= Commerce =

Exchange of goods and services

Commerce is the organized system of activities, functions, procedures and institutions that directly or indirectly contribute to the smooth, unhindered large-scale exchange of goods, services, and other forms of value, predominantly through transactional processes. Commercial dealings are conducted according to specific parameters regarding time, place, quantity, quality and price through various channels connecting the original producers and the final consumers within local, regional, national or international economies.

The diversity in the distribution of natural resources, differences of human needs and wants, and division of labour along with comparative advantage are the principal factors that give rise to commercial exchanges. By facilitating exchange, commerce enables specialization, and strengthens economic interdependence. thereby exerting significant impacts on economic development by boosting productivity and creating more job opportunities. However, various obstacles (such as aging infrastructure, complex regulatory requirements, and inefficient logistics), can give rise to a range of issues that not only hinder the flow of trade, but also drive up costs and limit commercial opportunities.

Commerce traces its origins to ancient localized barter systems, leading to the establishment of periodic marketplaces, and culminating in the development of currencies for efficient trade. Ancient civilizations expanded commerce through the trading systems of the Egyptians, Phoenicians, and Greco-Romans, alongside the Indian Ocean trade and the Silk Road. In medieval times, trade routes with pivotal commercial hubs (like Venice) connected regions and continents, enabling long-distance trade and cultural exchange. From the 15th to the early 20th century, European colonial powers dominated global commerce on an unprecedented scale, giving rise to maritime trade empires with their powerful colonial trade companies (e.g., Dutch East India Company and British East India Company) and ushering in an unprecedented global exchange (see Columbian exchange). In the 19th century, modern banking and related international markets along with the Industrial Revolution fundamentally reshaped commerce.

In the post-colonial 20th century, free market principles gained ground, multinational corporations and consumer economies thrived in U.S.-led capitalist countries and free trade agreements (like GATT and WTO) emerged, whereas communist economies encountered trade restrictions, limiting consumer choice. Furthermore, in the mid-20th century, the adoption of standardized shipping containers facilitated seamless and efficient intermodal freight transport, leading to a surge in international trade. By the century's end, developing countries saw their share in world trade rise from a quarter to a third. 21st century commerce is increasingly technology-driven (see e-commerce, role of artificial intelligence and automation), globalized, intricately regulated, ethically responsible and sustainability-focused (e.g., climate-resilient trade practices), with multilateral economic integrations (like the European Union) or coalitions (like BRICS), gig economy and platform-based uberisation of services, geopolitical shifts and trade wars leading to its reconfiguration.

== Scope and consequences ==
=== The nature and scope of commerce ===
Commerce consists of trade and aids to trade (i.e. auxiliary commercial services) taking place along the entire supply chain. As centers of commerce, markets are settings in which individuals and firms interact to trade products, services, and assets. Markets can be classified based on the nature of exchanges, geographical scope, and structural characteristics. An early form of trade, known as barter, involves the direct swapping of goods or services without the use of a medium of exchange. Today, however, the vast majority of trade is conducted using money as a medium of exchange. Trade in goods is the exchange of raw materials, intermediate and finished goods between buyers and sellers in return for an agreed-upon price at traditional or online marketplaces. In addition to tangible goods, trade in services refers to the provision and delivery of intangible products such as professional consulting, technical, or training services, and it has grown rapidly in recent years due to the expansion of e-commerce. In terms of geographic scope, trade can be categorized into domestic trade, including retail and wholesale as well as local, regional, inter-regional and international/foreign trade (encompassing import, export and entrepôt/re-export trades). Moreover, the scope of trade also extends to financial assets and instruments. The trading of various financial instruments, including bonds, stocks and other equity securities, foreign currencies, and derivatives, takes place through financial markets. Accordingly, the exchange of currencies (in foreign exchange markets), commodities (in commodity markets/exchanges) and securities and derivatives (in stock exchanges and other specialized financial markets), typically associated with finance and investment, also falls under the umbrella of trade.

The key driver of commerce is the potential for mutual benefit arising from differences in human needs and preferences, resource availability, and productive capabilities. Through exchange, individuals, organizations, and countries can acquire goods and services they cannot produce themselves, or acquire them at a lower cost than producing them independently.

=== Auxiliary commercial activities ===
On the other hand, auxiliary commercial activities (aids to trade) which facilitate trade, constitute a set of supporting functions. These trade-facilitating activities can be categorized as follows:

1. Marketing and communication: encompassing commercial intermediaries (resellers, brokers, agents, and various other services), advertising and promotional activities
2. Logistics and Distribution: including transportation, packaging and warehousing
3. Financial services: such as credit, financing, banking, and insurance

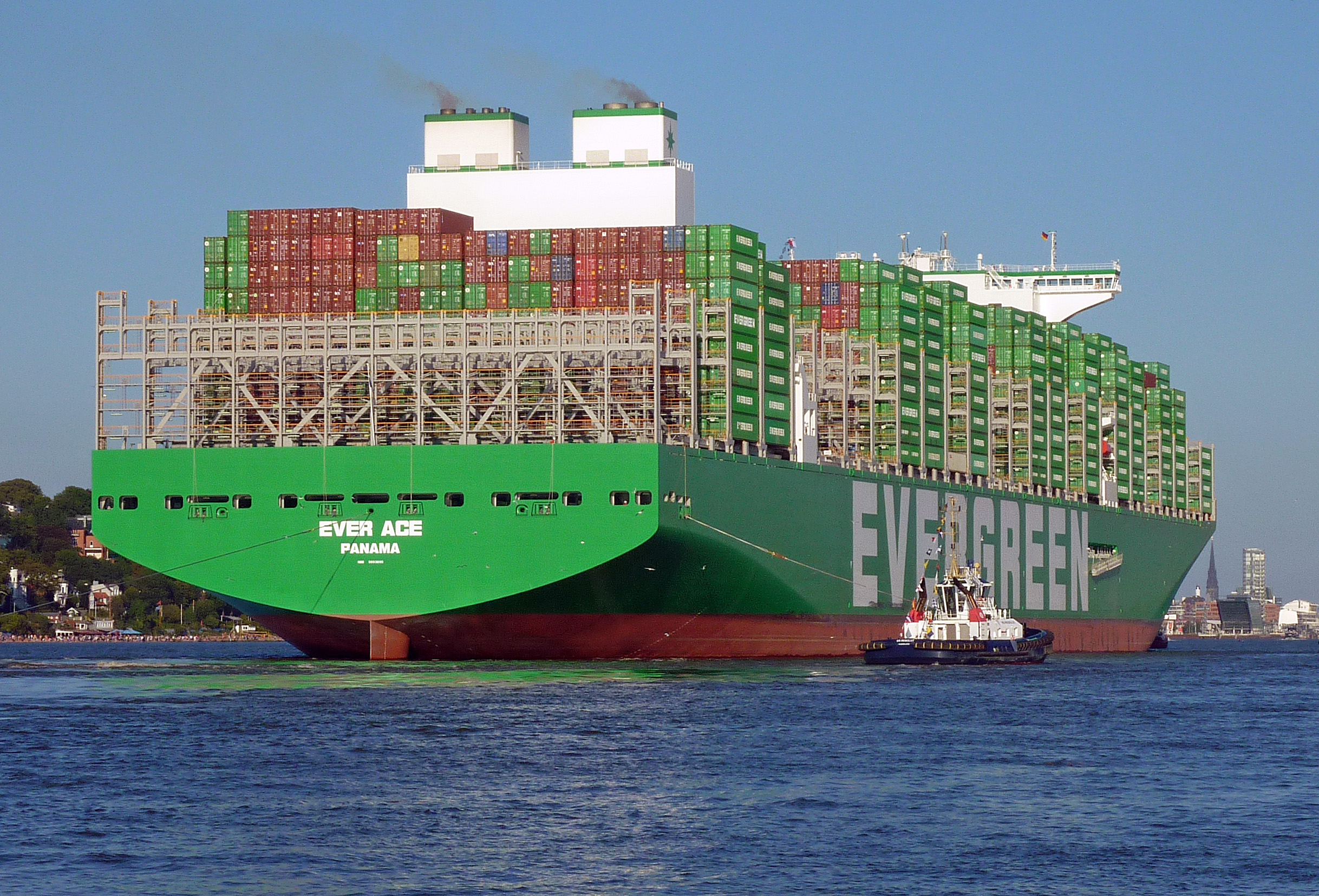
A container ship carrying cargo. Maritime transportation accounts for a significant share of the logistical infrastructure supporting global commerce.

Overall, auxiliary commercial activities aim to eliminate or mitigate various barriers to trade, including difficulties in connecting buyers and sellers, facilitating payments and accessing financial resources, savings and funding, the separation of place and time, issues regarding the protection and preservation of products and assets, limited access to market information and knowledge, and exposure to commercial risks.

=== The commercial environment and its broader determinants ===
The broader framework of commerce incorporates additional elements and factors such as laws and regulations (including intellectual property rights and antitrust laws), policies, tariffs and trade barriers, consumers and consumer trends, producers and production strategies, supply chains and their management, financial transactions for ordinary and extraordinary business activities, market dynamics (including supply and demand), technological innovation, competition and entrepreneurship, trade agreements, multinational corporations and small and medium-sized enterprises (SMEs), and macroeconomic factors (like economic stability).

=== Economic, social, and environmental Impacts ===
Commerce drives economic growth, development and prosperity, promotes regional and international interdependence, fosters cultural exchange, creates jobs, improves people's standard of living by giving them access to a wider variety of goods and services, and encourages innovation and competition for better products. On the other hand, commerce can worsen economic inequality by concentrating wealth (and power) into the hands of a small number of individuals, and by prioritizing short-term profit over long-term sustainability and ethical, social, and environmental considerations, leading to environmental degradation, labor exploitation and disregard for consumer safety. Unregulated, it can lead to excessive consumption (generating undesirable waste) and unsustainable exploitation of nature (causing resource depletion). Harnessing commerce's benefits for the society while mitigating its drawbacks remains vital for policymakers, businesses and other stakeholders, who are increasingly adopting sustainable practices, ethical sourcing, and circular economy models,

== Etymology ==
The English-language word commerce has been derived from the Latin word commercium, from com ('together') and merx ('merchandise').

== Relation to business and trade ==
Despite many similarities (to the extent that they are sometimes used as synonyms in layman's terms and in other contexts), commerce, business and trade are distinct concepts.

=== Commerce and business ===
Commerce deals with buying, selling, and distribution of goods and services from producers to customers as well as related matters such as marketing, finance, laws, transportation, and insurance.

In a general sense, business is the activity of earning money and making one's living through engaging in commerce. The difference between business and commerce is that business can also refer to a commercial entity, such as a company. So, in a more specific sense, a business is an organization or activity for making a profit by providing goods and services which meet the needs of its customers or consumers.

Viewed in this way, commerce is a broader concept and an overall, all-encompassing aspect of business. Although business enterprises are the principal actors engaging in commercial dealings, commerce refers to the entire system of transactions through which economic resources are exchanged. It provides the underlying large-scale transactional environment comprising all kinds of exchanges within which individual business organizations operate to generate profits.

=== Commerce and trade ===
Commerce is also distinguishable from trade. By its very nature, trade is fundamentally a mutually beneficial relationship involving the swapping of goods or services between two parties, where products are usually provided in return for money. Trade is the transaction (buying and selling) of goods and services that aims to generate profit for the seller and satisfies the want or need of the buyer. When trade is carried out within a country, it is called home or domestic trade, which can be wholesale or retail. A wholesaler buys from the producer in bulk and sells to the retailer who then sells again to the final consumer in smaller quantities. Trade between a country and the rest of the world is called foreign or international trade, which consists of import trade and export trade, both being wholesale in general.

Commerce comprises not only trade, as defined above, but also auxiliary services, or aids to trade, and various procedures designed to facilitate trade. Auxiliary services such as transportation, communication, warehousing, insurance, banking services including access to credit and important financial systems, ancillary activities such as funding technological research, and packaging and making use of services offered by commercial agents such as law firms and property brokerages. In other words, commerce describes the wide, dynamic range of political, economic, technological, logistical, legal, regulatory, social, and cultural aspects of trade in abstract terms, rather than as an assemblage of particular enterprises and actors.

Described in this manner, trade is a part of commerce and commerce is an aspect of business.

== Education ==
Commerce is offered as an interdisciplinary academic field, particularly in Commonwealth countries. Modern commerce programmes adopt a multidisciplinary approach to provide a comprehensive education in commercial activities. Such programmes typically encompass areas such as economics, finance, accounting, marketing, business analytics, supply chain, management and related fields. They reflect the broad scope of commerce, extending beyond the conventional exchange of goods and services, and prepare graduates for diverse careers in commerce and related professional fields.

=== Bachelor of Commerce ===
A Bachelor of Commerce (BCom or B Com) is an undergraduate degree in commerce, accounting, mathematics, economics, finance and management-related subjects. It is mainly offered in Commonwealth nations. The degree is designed to provide students with a wide range of managerial skills, while also building competence in a particular area of business. The Honours Bachelor of Commerce (BComm (Hons) or HBCom) may consist of a four-year program or of a one-year postgraduate program.

=== Master of Commerce ===
A Master of Commerce (MCom or M Com) is a postgraduate Master's degree. Its curriculum is generally concentrated on one subject area and emphasizes underlying theory, including a thesis component. Although variants in general management are offered, the degree's structure and focus distinguish it from broader business degrees, such as the MBA.

=== Doctor of Commerce ===
The Doctor of Commerce (DCom) degree is offered in New Zealand and in South Africa both as a higher doctorate, and as a research doctorate. The higher doctorate is awarded for published work of the candidate, demonstrating original contributions of "special excellence" in some branch of commerce; the candidate will be a graduate of the university in question. The research doctorate is largely comparable to a PhD in management.

== History ==
The caduceus – used today as the symbol of commerce, and traditionally associated with Mercury, the Roman god and patron of commerce and merchants.

=== Ancient commerce ===
==== Prehistoric trade and ancient Egypt ====
Commerce existed before written history. Archaeological finds of ornaments and weapons far from their places of origin show that prehistoric peoples engaged in exchange. Historian Peter Watson and Ramesh Manickam date the earliest long-distance exchange of goods to about 150,000 years ago. The earliest written records came from ancient Egypt, where an advanced civilization had developed by about 3000 BC. Egypt remained primarily an agricultural country. Commerce was limited because the Nile Valley was geographically uniform, leaving little need for internal exchange, while surrounding deserts and the sea hindered foreign trade.

Commerce expanded during the New Kingdom (from about 1600 BC), when caravan routes linked Egypt with Phoenicia, Syria, and the Red Sea region. Egypt imported spices, ivory, gold, wine, and oil, and exported grain, linen, and manufactured goods. Trade relied mainly on barter, and many imports came as tribute. In the last centuries before Alexander the Great's conquest of Egypt, the government encouraged commerce and Greek merchants came to Egypt in considerable numbers. Around 600 BC, Necho II reportedly sent Phoenician sailors to circumnavigate Africa and began construction of a canal linking the Nile and the Red Sea.

==== Mesopotamia and the Persian empires ====
While an advanced but relatively isolated civilization was developing in ancient Egypt, the Mesopotamian river valleys of the Tigris and Euphrates emerged as another early centre of commerce. Although rich in agricultural products, the region lacked many raw materials and, unlike Egypt, was more accessible to neighbouring lands. By about 3000 BC, Babylon had emerged as a major trading centre, exchanging grain, wool, precious metals, and building materials with Arabia, Syria, and Iran. Under the Assyrian and later the Persian Empire, political unity and internal security facilitated commerce across much of the Near East. Merchants could trade under a single authority until Alexander the Great conquered the Persian Empire in 330 BC.

==== Phoenicia ====
Trade routes of the Phoenician people in the Mediterranean Sea

Although commerce developed in Egypt and Mesopotamia, agriculture remained the dominant economic activity. By contrast, the Phoenicians, an ancient Semitic people who inhabited a narrow coastal strip along the eastern Mediterranean Sea, were the first people of antiquity whose prosperity depended primarily on commerce. Their limited natural resources encouraged trade. Using imported raw materials, the Phoenicians manufactured cloth, glass, metalware, and the highly prized Tyrian purple dye for export. They pioneered regular long-distance maritime trade, establishing extensive sea routes by about 1500 BC. They advanced shipbuilding and navigation throughout the ancient Mediterranean.

The Phoenicians gradually expanded their maritime trade from the eastern Mediterranean across the entire Mediterranean and into the Atlantic Ocean. They transported scarce commodities such as tin from Britain, copper from Cyprus and Spain, silver from Spain, and gold and ivory from Africa. To secure these trade networks, they established colonies and trading stations throughout the Mediterranean, including Gades and Carthage. After Phoenician influence declined, Carthage inherited much of its commercial network and became the dominant trading power in the western Mediterranean.

==== Ancient Greece ====
The geography of ancient Greece, with its indented coastline, numerous islands, and natural harbours, favoured the development of maritime trade, while shortages of grain encouraged overseas commerce. Between about 1000 and 600 BC, Greek colonies established trading networks across the Aegean Sea, Black Sea, southern Italy, and the western Mediterranean, gradually displacing the Phoenicians as the leading merchants of the Mediterranean. Domestic industries and exports developed alongside this commercial expansion. During the fifth century BC, Athens and its port of Piraeus became the principal commercial centre of the Greek world under a generally open commercial policy, importing grain and raw materials while exporting silver, pottery, and other manufactured goods. The conquests of Alexander the Great integrated markets across the eastern Mediterranean and western Asia, shifting commercial leadership from Greece to new Hellenistic cities such as Alexandria, Seleucia, and Antioch, while Rhodes emerged as a major centre of commerce, maritime law, and the suppression of piracy.

==== Ancient Rome ====
Unlike the earlier Greek commercial centres, Rome was not primarily a trading city. Its power rested on political and military organization rather than commerce, drawing food, taxes, and tribute from its provinces while exporting relatively little. Nevertheless, the Pax Romana created centuries of political stability that encouraged commerce across the empire. In the East, established centres such as Alexandria and Antioch continued to flourish, and trade expanded with regions as distant as India and China. Carthage also remained an important outlet for African trade.

Roman rule introduced roads, cities, and administrative order to western Europe, laying some foundations for economic development. However, commerce remained limited because most of the population relied on subsistence agriculture and local exchange. From the third century AD, the weakening of Roman authority brought political instability, piracy, and deteriorating infrastructure, contributing to the decline of commerce in western Europe and the transition to the Early Middle Ages.

==== Indian Ocean trade ====
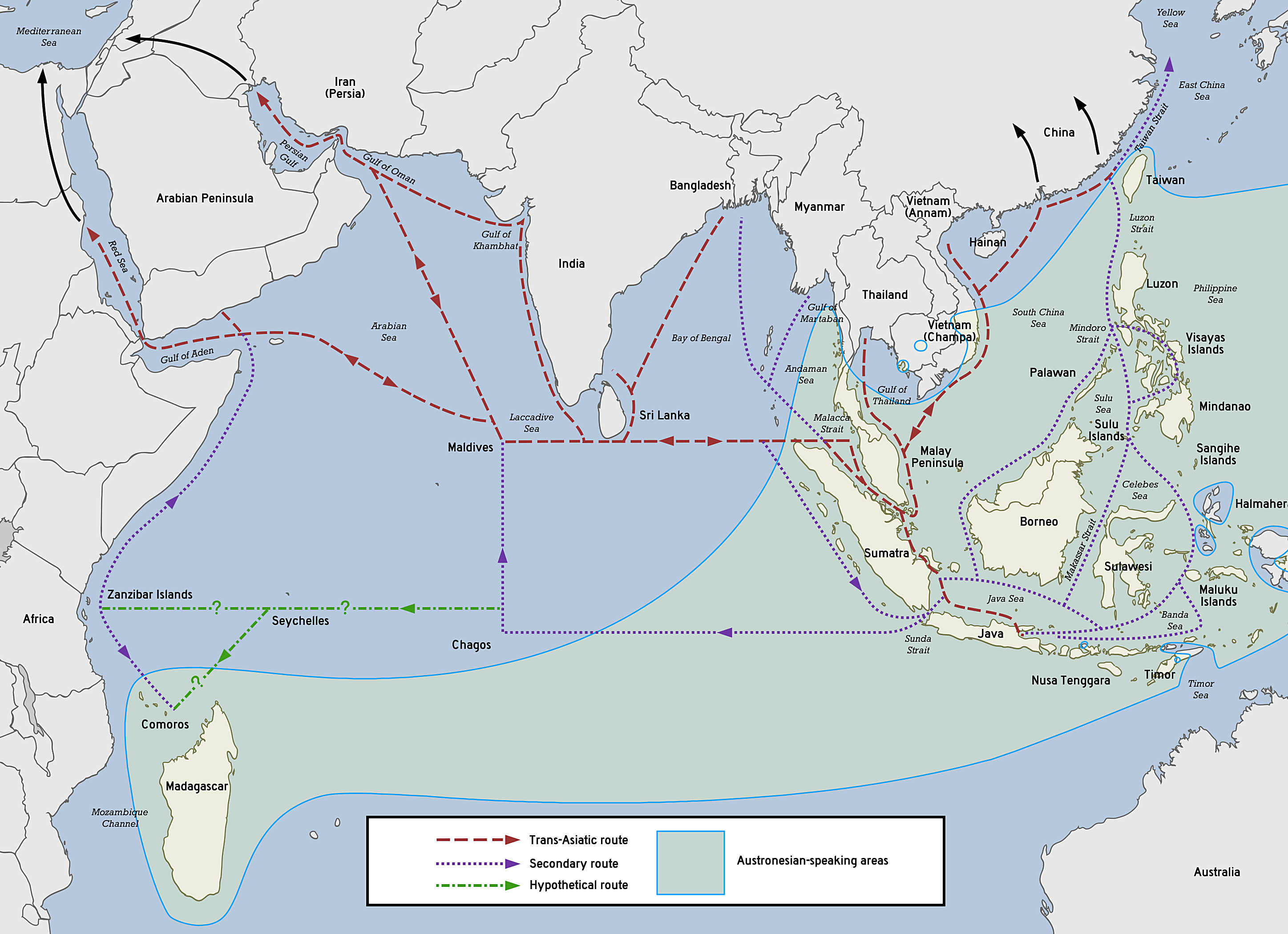
Austronesian proto-historic and historic maritime trade network in the Indian Ocean

While Mediterranean commerce developed around Egypt, Phoenicia, Greece, and Rome, the Austronesian peoples of Maritime Southeast Asia established an extensive Indian Ocean maritime trade network by at least 3000 BC, linking East Asia, South Asia, and eventually East Africa and the Arabian Peninsula. They exchanged technologies such as outrigger boats and catamarans, along with crops and spices including coconuts, bananas, sugarcane, cloves, and nutmeg. The network also helped connect the material cultures of India and China. By the first half of the first millennium AD, it had expanded as far as Madagascar, contributing to its Austronesian settlement, and later formed part of the broader Maritime Silk Road.

==== Silk road in ancient times ====
The Silk Road in the 1st century

While maritime commerce connected the Mediterranean and Indian Ocean worlds, overland trade across Central Asia also expanded during antiquity. The Silk Road is the modern name for a network of ancient overland trade routes, named after the Chinese silk traded along them. It assumed a more organized form during the Han dynasty following the missions of Zhang Qian and Chinese expansion into Central Asia around 130 BC. These routes linked China with the Parthian Empire and ultimately the Mediterranean world. During the Roman Empire, the Silk Road became the principal overland trade network connecting East Asia with the Mediterranean. Chinese silk, spices, precious stones, glassware, and other luxury goods were exchanged through intermediary merchants (notably the Sogdians in late antiquity), and diplomatic and cultural contacts also increased between China, Central Asia, India, the Middle East, and the Roman world. Although no single state controlled the entire route, successive empires secured different sections, facilitating one of antiquity's most extensive networks of commercial and cultural exchange.

==== Commerce in the ancient Americas ====
Poverty Point in Louisiana, a major centre of an ancient North American exchange network that obtained materials from hundreds of kilometers away.

Long-distance exchange networks connected distant regions of the Americas before European contact. Obsidian, marine shells, copper, mica and jadeite travelled hundreds of kilometres through these networks. In Mesoamerica, long-distance exchange was established by the Formative stage (2000 BC to 250 AD). During the Classic period, Teotihuacan became a major centre of production and distribution, with state-controlled procurement of obsidian from the Sierra de las Navajas and associated workshops. In North America, the Poverty Point network brought raw materials from sources hundreds of kilometres away, while the later Hopewell tradition connected communities across eastern North America, with exotic materials such as copper, mica, obsidian and marine shells transported from distant regions. In the Andes, exchange networks linked coastal, highland and lowland regions, including through the movement of Spondylus shells between Ecuador and Peru, while llama caravans facilitated interregional trade across contrasting ecological zones.

==== Currency and coinage ====
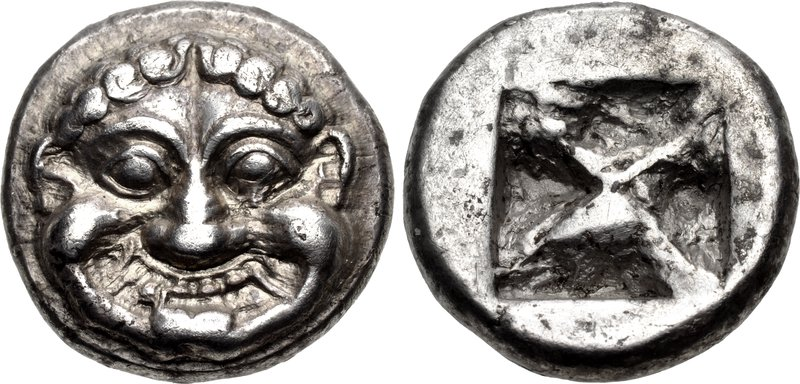
The earliest coinage of Athens, a "Wappenmünzen" didrachm struck c. 545-525/515 BC

As commerce expanded across the ancient world, barter became increasingly inefficient for long-distance trade. This led to the introduction of standardized currency to facilitate the exchange of goods and services. Although barter and commodity money remained common, the first manufactured coins appeared independently in India, China, and the cities around the Aegean Sea during the 7th century BC. The earliest modern-styled coinage is generally traced to the kingdom of Lydia in Asia Minor, where standardized gold, silver, and electrum coins spread throughout the Greek world and later the Persian Empire. Coinage spread rapidly across the Mediterranean, becoming widely adopted by the Greek city-states and later by the Persian and Roman empires. Standardized coins simplified commercial exchange, facilitated taxation, and supported the expansion of long-distance trade throughout antiquity.

=== Medieval commerce ===
==== Early medieval commerce in Europe ====
Following the collapse of the Western Roman Empire, political fragmentation under the feudal system, deteriorating infrastructure, and widespread insecurity severely restricted commerce in western Europe. Trade was largely confined to government-authorized markets, where transactions could be supervised and protected. Around the year 1000, the economy was dominated by largely self-sufficient manorial villages, leaving long-distance trade mostly limited to luxury goods such as wine, spices, and furs, together with a few essential commodities carried by merchants travelling under hazardous conditions.

==== Commercial expansion in Europe in the High Middle Ages ====
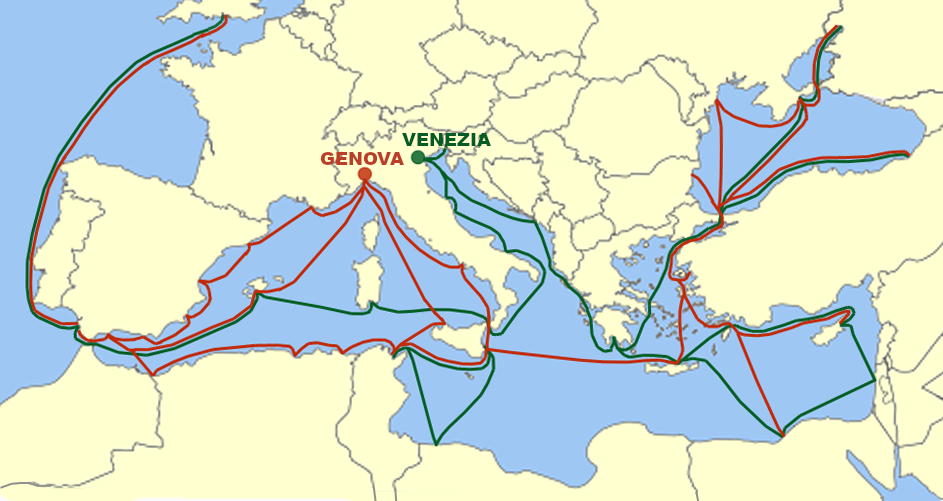
Maritime trade routes of the Republics of Genoa (red) and Venice (green) across the Mediterranean and Black Sea.

From the 11th century, population growth and agricultural expansion accompanied the revival of European towns and markets. The Champagne fairs, held periodically in four towns across the County of Champagne, connected merchants from northern Italy, Flanders and elsewhere, while Mediterranean trade expanded through Venice and Genoa, linking western Europe with Byzantine and Islamic commercial networks; the Crusades further stimulated demand for eastern goods, including spices and silk. Commercially prosperous towns in northern and central Italy developed into autonomous communes and city-states, with Venice and Genoa establishing extensive maritime networks across the Mediterranean and Black Sea, and Florence becoming a major centre of trade and finance. Expanding commerce also fostered banking, credit and other financial practices; the introduction of gold coinage in Florence in 1252 and its subsequent circulation through international trade facilitated commercial transactions.

Commerce was a costly endeavor in the antiquities because of the risky nature of transportation, which restricted it to local markets. Commerce then expanded along with the improvement of transportation systems over time. In the Middle Ages, long-distance and large-scale commerce was still limited within continents. Banking systems developed in medieval Europe, facilitating financial transactions across national boundaries. Markets became a feature of town life, and were regulated by town authorities. With the advent of the Age of Discovery and oceangoing ships, commerce took an international, trans-continental stature.

Currently, the reliability of international trans-oceanic shipping and mailing systems and the facility of the Internet has made commerce possible between cities, regions and countries situated anywhere in the world. In the 21st century, Internet-based electronic commerce (where financial information is transferred over Internet), and its subcategories such as wireless mobile commerce and social network-based social commerce have been and continue to get adopted widely.

== Classification of commercial transactions based on participant types ==
Commercial transactions are commonly classified according to the types of participants involved and the relationships between them. Although these participant classifications are widely used in electronic commerce and e-business, they apply equally to traditional commerce and are independent of the medium through which a transaction takes place.

=== Business-to-business (B2B) ===
Business-to-business (B2B) transactions occur between businesses, such as manufacturers, wholesalers, distributors, retailers, or service providers. B2B commerce often involves larger transaction values, longer-term commercial relationships, negotiated pricing, and specialized goods or services.

=== Business-to-consumer (B2C) ===
Business-to-consumer (B2C) or direct-to-consumer transactions involve businesses selling goods or services directly to individual consumers for personal use. Retail trade, whether conducted through physical stores or electronic commerce platforms, represents the most common form of B2C commerce.

=== Consumer-to-consumer (C2C) ===
Consumer-to-consumer or customer-to-customer (C2C) transactions occur directly between individual consumers, typically through intermediary marketplaces or online platforms that facilitate the exchange of goods and services.

=== Consumer-to-business (C2B) ===
Consumer-to-business (C2B) transactions involve individuals supplying goods or services to businesses. Examples include freelance professional services, user-generated content, crowdsourcing, and licensing arrangements through which individuals provide value to commercial organizations.

=== Business-to-government (B2G) ===
Business-to-government (B2G) transactions involve businesses supplying goods or services to government agencies and other public-sector organizations. Such transactions commonly occur through public procurement, government contracts, and competitive tendering processes.

=== Government-to-business (G2B) ===
Government-to-business (G2B) transactions involve governments providing licensing, regulatory, taxation, customs, and other administrative or information services to businesses. Increasingly, these services are delivered through digital government platforms that facilitate regulatory compliance and commercial activity.

=== Other participant-based classifications ===
Other participant-based classifications include government-to-consumer (G2C), consumer-to-government (C2G), and government-to-government (G2G). These interactions primarily relate to the delivery of public services, government administration, and intergovernmental cooperation rather than commercial transactions, and are therefore less commonly treated as forms of commerce.

== Regulation ==
The concept of “commerce” is central to defining the scope of governmental regulatory authority over commercial transactions and dealings. Legislative bodies and ministries or ministerial departments of commerce regulate, promote and manage domestic and foreign commercial activities within a country. At the national level, constitutional provisions may establish the legal basis for such authority. In the United States, for example, the Commerce Clause provides a constitutional foundation for federal regulation of commerce and congressional legislative measures. Similarly, New Zealand’s Commerce Act 1986, provides a statutory framework for the regulation of commerce focusing on market competition and interests of consumers within New Zealand.

International commerce can be regulated by bilateral treaties between countries. After the second world war and the rise of free trade among nations, multilateral arrangements such as the GATT and later the World Trade Organization became the principal systems regulating global commerce. The International Chamber of Commerce (ICC) is another important organization which sets rules and resolves disputes in international commerce.

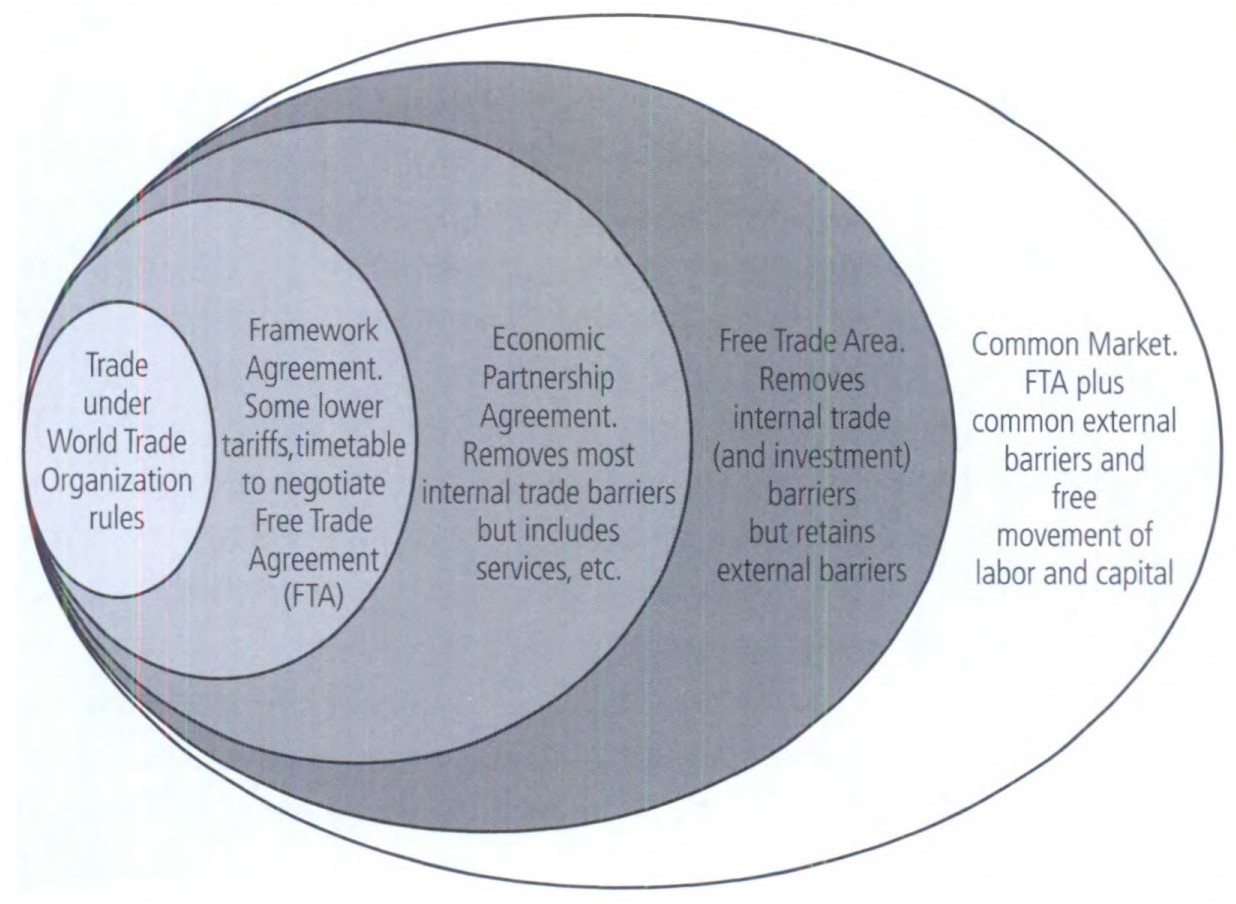
Types of trade arrangements between countries

Where national government bodies undertake commercial activity with or inside other states, this commercial activity may fall outside the protection of the international rules which govern legal relationships between independent states: see, for example, the "commercial activity exception" applicable under the United States' Foreign Sovereign Immunities Act of 1976.

== See also ==
- Commercialization
- Commercialism
- Capitalism
- Cargo
- Commerce clause
- Commercial management
- Commercial law
- Commercial revolution
- Eco commerce
- Economics
- Fair
- Financial planning (business)
- Laissez-faire
- Market (economics)
- Marketplace
- Mass production
- Merchandising
- Value (economics)
- Bachelor of Business Administration

== Bibliography ==
- Day, Clive (1940). A History of Commerce (4th ed.). New York: Longmans, Green and Company.
- Ebrey, Patricia Buckley. (1999). The Cambridge Illustrated History of China. Cambridge: Cambridge University Press. ISBN 978-0-521-66991-7.
- Edwards, Jeremy; Ogilvie, Sheilagh (2012). "What Lessons for Economic Development Can We Draw from the Champagne Fairs?". Explorations in Economic History. 49 (2): 131–148. doi:10.1016/j.eeh.2011.12.002.
- Ferguson, Niall (2008). The Ascent of Money: A Financial History of the World. New York: Penguin Press. ISBN 9781594201929.
- Liu, Xinru (2010). The Silk Road in World History. Oxford University Press. ISBN 978-0-19-516174-8.
- Lopez, Robert S. (1956). "Back to Gold, 1252". The Economic History Review. 9 (2): 219–240. doi:10.1111/j.1468-0289.1956.tb00658.x.
- Lopez, Robert S. (1976). The Commercial Revolution of the Middle Ages, 950–1350. Cambridge: Cambridge University Press. ISBN 9780521211116.
- Martin, John Jeffries; Romano, Dennis, eds. (2003). Venice Reconsidered: The History and Civilization of an Italian City-State, 1297–1797. Baltimore: Johns Hopkins University Press. ISBN 9780801863127.
- Skinner, Quentin (1978). The Foundations of Modern Political Thought. Vol. 1. Cambridge: Cambridge University Press. ISBN 9780521293372.
