= Shared Value Africa Initiative =

Shared Value Africa Initiative (SVAI) is a non-profit organization dedicated to promoting and implementing the concept of shared value in Africa. SVAI aims to drive sustainable economic development on the African continent by fostering collaboration between businesses, governments, and civil society organizations.

== Overview and objectives ==
SVAI operates as a regional platform that advocates for and supports the adoption of shared value principles across Africa. The organization recognizes that businesses can create long-term value for themselves and society by addressing social and environmental challenges through their core operations and strategies.

SVAI seeks to raise awareness and understanding of shared value among businesses, government agencies, and non-profit organizations. By providing resources, training, and thought leadership. SVAI encourages the integration of shared value principles into strategic decision-making processes.

SVAI facilitates collaboration between stakeholders from different sectors, including business leaders, policymakers, social entrepreneurs, and civil society organizations. By creating a platform for dialogue and partnership, SVAI promotes the exchange of ideas, best practices, and innovative solutions for shared value creation.

SVAI advocates for policy reforms and regulatory frameworks that enable and incentivize shared value initiatives. Through research, policy analysis, and engagement with policymakers, SVAI seeks to create an enabling environment for businesses to adopt and implement shared value strategies.

SVAI aims to build a community of shared-value practitioners across Africa. The organization organizes conferences, workshops, and networking events to connect professionals and organizations interested in advancing the shared value agenda.

SVAI provides support and guidance to businesses and social enterprises in implementing shared-value projects. Through mentorship programs, capacity-building initiatives, and access to funding opportunities, SVAI helps organizations create sustainable business models that address social and environmental challenges.

In 2019 Safaricom partnered with Shared Value Africa Initiative to host the Africa Shared Value Summit.
