= Rice production in Romania =

Rice production in Romania plays a fairly important role in food supply in Romania and is cultivated largely for domestic consumption but also for exports. As of 2009, Romania cultivated around 12,900 hectares (32,000 acres) of rice fields ranking third in the European Union in terms of rice area. The most important growing areas are located along the Danube River in Ialomița, Brăila, Olt and Dolj counties. In 2009 rice production reached 72,500 metric tons with a yield of 5.62 tons/hectare. According to FAOSTAT in 2008 Romania was ranked sixth in rice production in the EU with 48,917 metric tons, just after Italy, Spain, Greece, Portugal and France.

In Romania rice production began in the 1970s when the president Nicolae Ceauşescu, after visits to China and North Korea, forced peasants and convicts to cultivate and work rice fields located in South-Eastern Romania in Vlădeni commune. The action was supposed to make the country self-sufficient in terms of rice consumption. Total cultivated land reached 49,000 ha (120,000 acres) in 1989 but dropped dramatically between 2000 and 2003 to 500 ha (1,200 acres). In 2003 several companies realized the potential growth of this crop in Romania and the cultivated surface started to rise from year to year to 1,200 ha (3,000 acres) in 2004 to 5,600 ha (14,000 acres) in 2006 and to 12,900 ha (32,000 acres) in 2009.

The most important investor in rice production in Romania is Riso Scotti Danubio, owned by the Italian company Riso Scotti, the largest rice producer in Europe. In 2003 the company started to buy suitable lands for cultivation in Ialomița, Brăila, Olt and Dolj counties owning a total of 10,000 ha (25,000 acres). In 2009 Riso Scotti cultivated around 6,000 ha (15,000 acres) with rice, the rest of the land currently being prepared for use. In the same year production amounted to 30,000 metric tons. Around 60% of the production is intended for internal use and 40% is exported to Slovakia, Czech Republic, Poland, Lithuania, Latvia, Hungary, Serbia, Greece, Bulgaria, Armenia and Moldova. Another important company is Padova Agricultura owned by the Italian company Gruppo Roncato which owns 4,200 ha (10,000 acres) cultivated with rice in Brăila County. In 2009 the company produced 36,000 metric tons of rice which was mainly exported to Italy and Turkey but also delivered to Riso Scotti. The third largest producer of rice in Romania is also an Italian company, Beg Agricultura which owned 1,100 ha (2,700 acres) of cultivated rice in Olt County and had a harvest of 6,500 metric tons in 2009.
