= Peter Ndegwa =

Peter Ndegwa may refer to:

- Peter Ndegwa (business executive)
- Khalid Kamal Yaseen (born 1982), born Peter Ndegwa, Bahraini long-distance runner
