= Mobitelea Ventures Limited =

Mobitelea Ventures is the name of a company that formerly owned 12.5% of Vodafone Kenya Ltd, a 40% shareholder of Safaricom, a leading mobile network operator in Kenya.

According to Vodafone, Mobitelea Ventures Limited was brought in as a partner to advise on local business processes and protocol.

Documents obtained by The Guardian newspaper show that Mobitelea was registered in Guernsey on June 18, 1999. Mobitelea's owners are represented by two nominee firms, Guernsey – registered Mercator Nominees Ltd and Mercator Trustees Ltd. The directors are named as Anson Ltd and Cabot Ltd, based in Anguilla and Antigua.

Vodafone brought back half of Mobitelea's stake at the beginning of 2003 and, during the year ending 31 March 2009, Mobitelea sold their remaining indirect shareholding in Safaricom to the Vodafone Group.

Today, the shareholder structure of Safaricom is: Government of Kenya 35%; Vodafone 40%; Free Float 25%.
