= Peter Ndegwa (business executive) =

Kenyan business executive

- Born: 1969 (age 56–57); Kenya
- Education: Starehe Boys' Centre and School
- Alma mater: University of Nairobi (B.A.Econ); University of London (M.B.A); Institute of Certified Public Accountants in Kenya (C.P.A)
- Occupations: Businessman and Corporate Executive
- Years active: 1993 - present
- Known for: Leading Safaricom as CEO & Previously as head of Diageo Europe
- Title: Chief Executive Officer of Safaricom
- Predecessor: Robert William Collymore

Peter Ndegwa is a Kenyan businessman, accountant and corporate executive, who is the chief executive officer at Safaricom, the largest telecommunications company in the countries of the East African Community, with approximately 50 million subscribers in December 2020. He is the first Kenyan to lead in Safaricom.

Before his current appointment, he was the Managing Director for Continental Europe and Russia, at Diageo. He was responsible for Diageo's spirits and beer business across more than 50 countries in Western Europe, Eastern Europe and Russia, excluding the United Kingdom and Ireland. The business comprises six business units each with a General Manager.

== Early life and education ==
Ndegwa was born in Kenya in 1969. He attended Starehe Boys' Centre and School, where he obtained a High School Diploma. He was admitted to the University of Nairobi, where he obtained a Bachelor's degree in Economics. Later, he graduated from the London School of Business with a Master of Business Administration. He is also a Certified Public Accountant.

== Career ==
He worked as a consultant at PricewaterhouseCoopers, based in the United Kingdom. Later Ndegwa joined East African Breweries (EABL) in 2004 as the Director of Strategy, based in Nairobi, Kenya's capital city. After eight years at EABL, he was appointed as the Managing Director of Guinness Ghana Breweries Limited (GGBL), in December 2011. He worked there until August 2015, when he was appointed to head Guinness Nigeria. Partly on account of his successes in Ghana and Nigeria, in July 2018, he was appointed General Manager of Diageo’s business in Western and Eastern Europe, including Russia. He was based in Amsterdam in the Netherlands.

On 24 October 2019, the board of directors of Safaricom appointed Peter Ndegwa as the next CEO, effective 1 April 2020. He is the first Kenyan in that role. He took over from former Safaricom CEO Michael Joseph, who has been interim CEO of Safaricom Limited since July 2019.

Ndegwa is the next substantive CEO at Safaricom, since the death of Bob Collymore, who died on 1 July 2019.

== Personal life ==
Peter Ndegwa is a married man. He has one child.
