= Blended value =

Conceptual framework

Blended value is a conceptual framework in which non-profit organizations, businesses, and investments are evaluated based on their ability to generate a blend of financial, social, and environmental value. Blended value propositions are founded on the notion that value cannot be bifurcated, and is inherently made up of more than one measurement of performance. Blended value suggests the true measure of any organization is in its ability to holistically perform in all 3 areas. Jed Emerson introduced the concept of blended value around 2000 in response to the traditional division between profit and non-profit fundings. Bleded value is related to, but distinct from concepts such as the triple bottom line and ESG.

== Background ==
The concept of blended value first emerged around 2000 as a reaction to the traditional division within philanthropy. Historically, organizations treated financial returns and social value as an "either/or" choice that could not be combined. Instruments and investings were placed on a rigid spectrum. On the one side, instruments seeking full social value and returns with no consideration of financial performance and return. On the other side, instruments such as market rate loans and equity, measuring performance strictly in financial and economic terms. Investments and returns were traditionally viewed through this separation. According to Emerson, this view was "inherently wrong", and should not be seen as a "trade off", but instead a value proposioton composed of both.

Furthermore, the framework stems from Emerson's critique of the division between foundation investments and program activities. Historically, foundations typically invested a larger percent of their assets solely for financial returns, and less to generate environmental and social value. Emerson challenged this approach, arguing that foundations should combine their social and environmental assets to create a total value.

Jed Emerson founded the Center for Blended Value in 2000 to promote the development of investments where economic, social, and environmental value interact. The center writings and presentations provide a broader understanding for the concept of blended value.

In 2007, financial innovators, philanthroper and leader were gathered at Rocketfeller Foundation Center in Bellagio to discuss how privat capital could be used to solve social and environmental problems. The concept of impact investing was innovated as a result, building on principles of blended value by generationing measurable social and environemtal impact alongside financial returns. In 2009, the Global Impact Investing Network (GIIN) was created.

=== Comparison to similar concepts ===
Although blended value is commonly used synonymously with other impact frameworks, it is built on a different theoretical foundation.

Triple Bottom Line (TBL): Triple Bottom Line was created by John Elkington to encourage organizations to measure performance across three pillars: people, planet and profit. While Elkington frames these as three distinct pillars, Emerson conceptualize value as one integrated blend.

ESG (Environmental, Social and Governance): ESG originated from UN Global Compact initiativ Who Cares Wins from 2004 and is commonly used by investors as a risk management and valuation tool to analyze and manage risks connected to non-financial factors. In contrast to blended value, ESG functions as a tool to analyze external risks, rather than aligning environmental, social and economic values into a whole.

Creating shared Value (CSV): Introduced by Michael Porter and Mark R. Kramer in a 2011 Harvard Business Review article, creating shared value describes a business strategy where organizations create economic values while contributing to society.

== Dimensions ==
According to Jed Emerson, blended value creation means that all organizations generate a combination of economic, social, and environmental outcomes simultaneously. Instead of viewing financial return and social or environmental impact as either or, the concept treats value as a unified whole.

1. Social dimension
2. Environmental dimension
3. Economic dimension

== Blended Value In Action ==
=== Five silos of Blended Value ===
Blended value activity is most apparent within five sectors, or “silos”, in which organizations are more likely to intentionally seek a blend of social, environmental and financial elements of performance. The five silos are:

- Social Enterprise: Enterprises that use business skills and concepts to have a meaningful and sustainable social impact. Rather than maximizing profit, social enterprises try to enrich the lives of people who are poor, sick or disenfranchised.
- Impact Investing: Private investors in pursuit of financial, social, and environmental returns providing capital to sustainable enterprises with a social mission.
- Strategic Philanthropy: Strategic Philanthropy is an approach to philanthropic giving not as simply charitable donations, but rather taking an investing discipline for the creation of social value.
- Corporate Social Responsibility Programs: CSR describes companies and business managers/leaders who consciously integrate strategies that seek to create environmental and social value within side programs, operations and supply chains. CSR may also be manifest in terms of how a company manages its investments and philanthropy.
- Sustainable Development: Guiding principle of global development that places emphasis on environmental sustainability, and improving the economic and social conditions of the developing world.

=== Blended Value Business Models ===
Organizations that incorporate Blended Value Business Models are actively seeking to maximize their value to society while maximizing their financial efficiency. An example is a fair trade coffee cooperative, which creates social value through the guaranteed minimum prices paid to coffee farmers and direct community development investments. Their model's ability to yield blended value depends on its financial viability. Blended value suggests that all 3 components (social, financial, and environmental) must be integrated into any value assessment.

==== Supply Chains ====
A business model's supply chain is also considered when assessing their blended value creation. Under the blended value framework, an apparel company, for example, that sources its clothes from a sweatshop factory—like the factory involved in the 2013 Savar building collapse—would generate a low level of social value. Blended value propositions dictate organizations (for-profit and non-profit alike) should actively try to choose suppliers who also generate high blended value; to continue the example above, an apparel company that sources from a fair trade certified textile manufacturer would yield a high level of blended value.

=== Blended Value in Investing ===
Emerson proposed the term “Blended Value” within the context of impact investing to describe the various categories of returns an investor should be looking for. Emerson posits the idea that measuring investments purely in terms of financial returns is a disingenuous assessment of reality because there are social and environmental implications to any business activity. There is a slight distinction between a business model that generates blended value, and an investment creating blended value. The difference can be explained through the concept of additionality. Additionality is the added value that can be attributed to the investment (i.e. if an investment has high level of additionality, then a large part of the organizations impact can be isolated and attributed to that specific injection of capital). This isolation is meant to convey how exactly the capital from the investment creates varying levels of value. Organizations gather data in order to report their performance to their investors. When investors seek blended value, they look for social, environmental, and financial returns. Although there is no single standardized measurement system to define these returns for investors, efforts are being taken by organizations such as GIIN and GIIRS to create a set of measurement tools and metrics that make holistic assessment of investments more feasible. The current systems include:

- IRIS+ - Impact Reporting and Investment Standards. Created by GIIN, IRIS+ is a framwork for Impact Measurement and Management (IMM) that is designed to help investors measure, manage and evaluate their impact.
- GIIRS Ratings
- SROI- Social Return on Investment
- PULSE.
