= Fair chain =

Economic principle

Fair Chain aims to establish a more equitable distribution of returns in a production chain. For many products, the exporting country or farmer receives a disproportionate percentage of the retail price relative to the seller. In turn, fair chain extends beyond fair trade by focusing on supply chain integration in addition to pricing.

In 2012, the fair chain principles were first developed by Dutch-born entrepreneur Guido van Staveren van Dijk when he founded Moyee Coffee, a Dutch-Ethiopian company. Moyee applies the fair chain concept in coffee production by roasting, mixing and packaging beans in the country of origin, instead of in Europe or the United States as is standard practice. This business model helps retain more added value in the producing country and fits into the idea of creating shared value. Moyee directly aligns its economic and social interests by:

- paying a large premium on the local price for beans
- roasting locally, in a joint venture with local partners who invest in improving the agricultural and living conditions
- allocating profits to fund social projects that reinforce the fair chain principles

Other initiatives considered to operate according to fair chain principles include Escoffee in Ecuador and Azahar Coffee in Colombia ("Value Added at Source").

FairAfric (https://www.fairafric.com/) is the first company to produce chocolate directly in Ghana.

Also specialized fair trade retailers are increasingly offering products that are completely manufactured and packaged in the country of origin. This is typically the case for artisan crafts, but also für tea, coffee and other food products.
