= List of mobile network operators in Kenya =

This is a list of mobile network operators in Kenya:

- Safaricom
- Airtel Kenya
- Telkom Kenya
- Cloud One Limited
- Jamii Telecommunications Limited

== Market share ==
As of October 2018, the market share among Kenyan mobile telephone operators was as depicted in the table below.

Market Share Among Mobile Network Operators In Kenya
Rank	Name of Operator	Millions of Customers	Market Share (%)
1	Safaricom	29.7	65.4
2	Airtel Kenya	9.7	21.4
3	Telkom Kenya	3.8	8.9
4	Finserve	1.9	4.3
5	Others	0.3	0.11
	Total	45.4	100.00

Note:Totals are slightly off due to rounding.

== See also ==
- Telecommunications in Kenya
- Communications Authority of Kenya
- Economy of Kenya
