= Bob Collymore =

Guyanese-born Kenyan businessman (1958–2019)

Robert William 'Bob' Collymore
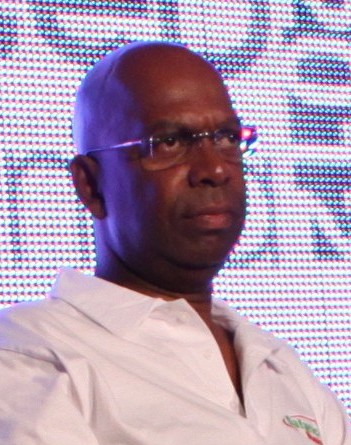
- Collymore at the Tokyo International Conference of African Development
- Born: 13 January 1958; Guyana
- Died: 1 July 2019 (aged 61)
- Occupation: Chief executive officer at Safaricom
- Years active: 2010–2019
- Predecessor: Michael Joseph
- Successor: Peter Ndegwa
- Spouse: Wambui Kamiru
- Children: 2
- Website: bobcollymore.com

Robert William Collymore (13 January 1958 – 1 July 2019) was a Guyanese-born Kenyan businessman who served as the chief executive officer at Safaricom, a multi-national telecommunications company based in Kenya.

== Early life and education ==
Collymore was born in Guyana and raised by his grandparents there. At the age of 16, he moved to join his mother in the United Kingdom, attending Selhurst High School. Upon leaving school, he was offered a place at Warwick University, but had to turn this down as he was ineligible for funding.

== Career ==
From 1993, Collymore worked in various positions in the telecommunications industry in the UK, including work for Cellnet, Dixons Retail and Vodafone UK. In 2003 he moved to Japan to manage the integration of J-Phone into the Vodafone Group.

In 2006 he became the Governance Director for Africa at Vodafone and subsidiary Safaricom. In 2010 he was appointed chief executive officer of Safaricom.

== Personal life ==
Collymore married his third wife, Wambui Kamiru, an artist, on 1 April 2016 in an invitation-only wedding at an upmarket residence in Kitisuru, Nairobi. Collymore met Kamiru in Nairobi during a fundraiser for survivors of the Loreto Convent Msongari school bus crash that occurred in July 2011. She was part of the event in her capacity as an alumnus and Collymore was there representing Safaricom Foundation with fundraising. Collymore had two children during his second marriage, and became stepfather to his wife's children from her first marriage to Joseph Kinyua.

== Illness and death ==
Collymore travelled to the United Kingdom in October 2017 to receive treatment for acute myeloid leukemia. He returned to Kenya in July 2018 to resume his duties as CEO of Safaricom while undergoing treatment. He died at his home on the morning of 1 July 2019.

== Awards ==
Collymore was in 2012 awarded a Moran of the Order of the Burning Spear.

Conferrer	Award	Year
African Investor	CEO of the Year	2017
African Investor	International Business Leader	2016
President of Kenya	Moran of the Order of the Burning Spear	2012
