= Safaricom =

Kenyan mobile network operator

Coordinates: 01°15′33″S 36°47′10″E

Safaricom PLC
- Trade name: Safaricom (SCOM)
- Type: Public
- Traded as: NSE: SCOM
- Industry: Telecommunications
- Founded: 1997; 29 years ago
- Headquarters: Nairobi, Kenya
- Key people: Adil Khawaja (Non-Executive chairman); Peter Ndegwa, CEO
- Products: GSM related products and mobile money transfer
- Brands: M-Pesa; Masoko; Fuliza; DigiFarm; M-Shwari; Mali; Ziidi MMF
- Services: Mobile telephony; Mobile money transfer; Consumer electronics; Ecommerce; Cloud computing; Data; Music streaming; Fibre optic
- Revenue: ▲KSh.264.02 billion/= (2021)
- Operating income: ▲KSh.96.16 billion/= (2021)
- Net income: ▼KSh.68.6 billion/= (2021)[
- Owner: Vodacom (55.00%)
- Number of employees: 6,616+ (2023)
- Subsidiaries: Safaricom Telecommunications Ethiopia
- Website: www.safaricom.co.ke

Safaricom PLC is a listed Kenyan mobile network operator headquartered at Safaricom House in Nairobi, Kenya. It is the largest telecommunications provider in Kenya, and one of the most profitable companies in the East and Central Africa region. The company offers mobile telephony, mobile money transfer, consumer electronics, ecommerce, cloud computing, data, music streaming, and fibre optic services. It is most renowned as the home of M-PESA, a mobile banking SMS-based service.

Safaricom controls approximately 65.7% percent of the Kenyan market as of 2024 with a subscriber base estimated at approximately 47 million. In July 24th 2025, CEO Peter Ndegwa in a statement said that the company has surpassed 50 million customers on its network. He attributed this to the deep connection the company had built with Kenyans over the past two and a half decades. The company also recently hit 10 million customers in Ethiopia, where it entered in 2022 and has been expanding its regional footprint in the entire East Africa region.

== History ==
Safaricom was formed in 1997 as a fully owned subsidiary of Telkom Kenya. In May 2000, Vodafone Group PLC of the United Kingdom acquired a 40% stake and management responsibility for the company. In 2008, the government offered 25% of its shares to the public through the Nairobi Securities Exchange.

Safaricom was ranked as Africa's Best Employer, 67th in the World by the Forbes Global 200 list of the World's Best Employers. In March 2018, Safaricom was ranked as the #1 company to work for in the annual list of BrighterMonday Best 100 Companies to Work for in Kenya, according to career professionals and job seekers.

In 2019 Safaricom partnered with Shared Value Africa Initiative to host the Africa Shared Value Summit.

As of 2020, Safaricom employed over 4,500 people permanently and over 1,900 people on contract. 75 percent of the company's employees were based in Nairobi, the Headquarters, with the remainder based in other big cities like Mombasa, Kisumu, Nakuru and Eldoret, in which it operates retail outlets. It has nationwide dealerships to ensure customers across the country have access to its products and services.

In November 2012, Safaricom partnered with NCBA Bank and came up with a "revolutionary" banking product, M-Shwari, which allows M-Pesa customers to save and borrow money through mobile phone while earning interest on money saved tapping into an underdeveloped financial services market.

Michael Joseph served as the founding CEO between July 2000 and November 2010. He transformed the telecom from a subscriber base of less than 20,000 to over 16.71 million during his previous tenure. In his last full year as CEO, Safaricom posted a 37 percent rise in pretax profit.

Bob Collymore took over at Safaricom in November 2010, replacing Joseph, who went on to serve in the telco giant's board as the Chairman. Collymore oversaw the introduction into the market of various mobile money products that have given the company leverage among its competitors. Collymore was also at the forefront in leading the charge against regulatory efforts to clip the company's wings due to its size and dominance. After a two-year battle with cancer, Bob, the longest-serving executive died on July 1, 2019, leaving behind a company with doubled user base and profits increased by 380%. Joseph was appointed as interim chief.

Peter Ndegwa was appointed as CEO effective April 1, 2020.

In January 2023, Safaricom made Adil Khawaja chairman of the board of directors.

In May 2024, Safaricom was affected by communication disruptions following the severing of submarine cables across East Africa.

=== Flashback service (Please Call Me) ===
Most of Safaricom's network congestion emerges from a practice called 'flashing'. Flashing is the practice of calling another mobile user, but disconnecting before the connected call is answered. It provides a method for mobile users to alert someone that they wish to be called, but either cannot, or will not, pay for the call. The method is cost-free for the users; but costly in network bandwidth. That is why Safaricom introduced a flashback service that gave every subscriber five free SMS messages with a single predefined message stating "Please call me. Thank you". Although the messages can be annoying when sent just for fun they can prove useful when one is in trouble and has no airtime. It also gives parents more of a reason to get mobile phones for their children without the real need for getting them airtime.

Lipa na M-PESA

Launched: 2012. Merchant payment ecosystem (Buy Goods, PayBill, Till numbers) enabling cashless payments for businesses.Over 200,000 businesses by 2020 Grew to 500,000+ businesses (via later Fuliza ya Biashara context) . Transitioned M-PESA from P2P transfers to a full merchant economy backbone in Kenya.

KCB M-PESA

Launched: March 2015. Savings + loan product in partnership with KCB Bank.Expanded credit access directly via mobile.

M-TIBA

Launched: December 2015. Mobile health wallet for managing and tracking medical funds.Enables targeted healthcare financing + donor tracking. One of the earliest digital health financing platforms in Africa.

M-PESA Global

Launched: 2010. Enables international money transfers and payments.Opened cross-border remittances directly to mobile wallets Extended M-PESA from local to a global financial network.

'M-PESA 334# (Unified USSD Platform)'

Launched: 2020. Consolidated M-PESA services into one USSD menu.Improved access for non-smartphone users. Critical for inclusion in low-smartphone segments.

M-PESA Business App (M-PESA for Business)

Launched: June 2020. App for merchants to track payments, statements, and performance. Built for 170,000+ merchants at launch.Shift from payments to a business management tool.

M-PESA Go

Launched: November 2022.Financial service for 10–17-year-olds with parental controls.Targets financial literacy + early adoption. Expands ecosystem to next-gen users.

=== Kipokezi service ===
Safaricom launched the Kipokezi service in May 2000 that enabled its subscribers to send and receive email and online chat through standard mobile phones. The service did not require users to have an Internet connection as it used ForgetMeNot Africa's Handset Initiation technology. Prior to the service fewer than one in ten Kenyans had accessed the Internet but the Kipokezi launch allowed more than a third of the population to exchange email and online chat messages.

=== Lipa Mdogo Mdogo ===
In partnership with Google, Safaricom introduced Lipa Mdogo Mdogo, a product targeting individuals with 2G phones by upgrading them to 4 G-enabled devices while paying daily installments of Ksh.20 over a period of one year.

Ndegwa, the CEO of the company, pointed out that they were targeting 1 million customers with plans of rolling the service to other countries depending on its initial success.

== Network ==
2G service on 900 MHz and 1800 MHz. 3G DC-HSPA+ service on 900 MHz & 2100 MHz. Safaricom later launched LTE-A (4G service with carrier aggregation) service in Nairobi and Mombasa on band 20 (800 MHz) and band 3 (1800 MHz) in December 2014 and has expanded to other cities. Safaricom's competitors, Airtel Kenya and Telkom Kenya have expressed dissatisfaction with the way the regulatory body Communications Authority of Kenya, awarded Safaricom its LTE (long Term Evolution) license to operate at 800 MHz.

Safaricom was the first company in Kenya to possess 3G Internet technology with the recent success of 4G / LTE connectivity currently in all major Kenyan cities. In March 2021, Safaricom became the second network operator in Africa after Vodacom to launch a live 5G network, initially available in Nairobi, Kisumu, Kakamega and Kisii.

== M-PESA ==
M-PESA (M for mobile, pesa is Swahili for money) is a mobile phone-based money transfer, financing and micro financing service, launched in 2007 by Vodafone for Safaricom and Vodacom. M-PESA was originally designed as a system to allow microfinance-loan repayments to be made by phone, reducing the costs associated with handling cash. After the pilot testing it was broadened to become a general money-transfer scheme. Since then Safaricom M-PESA brand has reached 12 countries in Africa and three countries outside the continent.

=== South Africa ===
In September 2010 Vodacom and Ned bank announced the launch of the service in South Africa, where there were estimated to be more than 13 million "economically active" people without a bank account. M-Pesa has been slow to gain a toehold in the South African market compared to Vodacom's projections that it would sign up 10 million users in the following three years. By May 2011, it had registered approximately 100,000 customers. The gap between expectations for M-Pesa's performance and its actual performance can be partly attributed to differences between the Kenyan and South African markets, including the banking regulations at the time of M-Pesa's launch in each country. According to Money Web, a South African investment website, "A tough regulatory environment with regards to customer registration and the acquisition of outlets also compounded the company's troubles, as the local regulations are more stringent in comparison to our African counterparts. Lack of education and product understanding also hindered efforts in the initial roll out of the product." In June 2011, Vodacom and Nedbank launched a campaign to re-position M-Pesa, targeting the product to potential customers who have a higher Living Standard Measures (LSM) index than were first targeted.

Despite efforts, as at March 2015, M-Pesa still struggled to grow its customer base. This comes as no surprise as South Africa is well known for being ahead of financial institutions globally in terms of maturity and technological innovation. According to Genesis Analytics, 70% of South Africans are "banked", meaning that they have at least one bank account with an established financial institution which have their own banking products which directly compete with the M-Pesa offering.

=== Tanzania ===
M-Pesa was launched in Tanzania by Vodacom in 2008 but its initial ability to attract customers fell short of expectations. In 2010, the International Finance Corporation released a report which explored many of these issues in greater depth and analyzed the strategic changes that Vodacom has implemented to improve their market position. As of September 2021, M-Pesa in Tanzania has 12.66 million subscribers.

=== India ===
M-Pesa was launched in India as a close partnership between Vodafone India and ICICI bank in November 2011 under the leadership of Mr Suresh Sethi. The service today operates in all telecom circles where Vodafone India is present. Users (of any telecom operator) can activate the M-Pesa service by downloading the Vodafone M-Pesa app (available on all app stores) on to their phones and registering themselves or by visiting any Vodafone store, Vodafone mini-store or M-Pesa agent point across the country. Customers of Vodafone can also activate the M-Pesa service by dialing *400# from their mobiles and completing the registration process. Using the *400# (USSD) facility allows Vodafone customers to avail of the benefits of M-Pesa without having a smartphone or a data connection. Registration is entirely free of charge.

A customer who activates his M-pesa wallet by only providing his basic demographic details and not sharing any proof of identity is enabled as a minimum KYC customer on M-Pesa. A minimum KYC customer of M-Pesa can not do money transfer (P2B, P2P) from his wallet account but can avail services like recharges (Prepaid mobile/DTH), bill payments, merchant payments, EMI payments, utility payments, insurance payments etc. They also have a monthly /daily/per transaction limit of ₨.10,000/-. If a minimum KYC M-Pesa customer wants to avail of bank transfer facility/increase his or her monthly transaction limit, then he or she can do so by doing their KYC using their Aadhar at any Vodafone store or M-Pesa agent point.

M-Pesa in India operates under two licenses, the PPI (Prepaid Payment Instruments) license issued by the Reserve Bank of India and the business correspondent license issued by ICICI bank. M-Pesa has also received in -principle nod of the regulator to set up a payments bank in India. Vodafone M-Pesa is the largest business correspondent channel in India with 1.5 lac+ M-Pesa agents who are enabled to provide cash-in, cash-out and assisted payments facility to M-Pesa customers.

== Shareholding ==
In 2008, reports appearing in the cross section of the press indicated that Vodafone Plc of UK only owned 35% while the remaining 5% was owned by a little-known company, Mobitelea Ventures Limited. The reports caused a stir which led to the summoning of its CEO Michael Joseph to appear before the PIC "Public Investment Committee", where he denied knowing who the other shareholder is. A spokesman for Vodafone said "the PIC has no powers to investigate M&A activity (see Mergers and Acquisitions), only to ask to view company accounts of Vodafone Kenya Limited, a company registered in Kenya. Mobitelea Ventures Limited were granted an option to purchase 25% of Vodafone's shares which they completed in 2002, Vodafone bought back half of the stake in 2003 for $10 million, and in the financial year ending 31 March 2009 purchased the remaining indirect equity stake of 5%, thus returning Vodafone to its original 40% stake-holding. Vodafone said that whilst it would like to disclose who owns Mobitelea it is unable to because of a confidentiality agreement.

As of December 2025, the company's stock was owned by the following public and private entities. The stock of the company is listed on the Nairobi Stock Exchange, where it trades under the symbol: SCOM.

Safaricom stock ownership
Rank	Name of owner	Percentage ownership
1	Vodacom	55.0
2	Retail investors via the Nairobi Stock Exchange	25.0
3	Government of Kenya	20.0
	Total	100.00

== Controversies ==
=== Tracking and extra-judicial killings of Safaricom subscribers ===
On 29 October 2024, the Daily Nation reported Safaricom to be involved in abductions and extra-judicial killings by police by using Safaricom call detail records (CDRs) to track its subscribers without valid court orders. According to the article, Safaricom CDRs used to locate its subscribers are routinely accessed contrary to due process and procedure, e.g. without police occurrence book entries or occurrence book entries obtained informally then used to track and either abduct or kill suspects.

The investigation also alleged that Safaricom produced inconsistent, redacted or false records before courts. For example, on 8 February 2022, a court ordered Safaricom to disclose call records about abducted Safaricom mobile subscriber Trevor Ndwiga, but the records produced contained inconsistencies such as placing Ndwiga at vastly different locations at the same time. The investigation further alleged that in January 2017, Safaricom produced inconsistent records regarding a case where the Kenyan intelligence officers collaborated with South Sudanese intelligence officers to abduct two South Sudanese activists who were "probably executed", according to UN experts' analysis.

On 31 October 2024, Safaricom denied the allegations of violations of its subscribers privacy without addressing the specific cases that were published where Safaricom was alleged to be complicit in abductions and extrajudicial killings. In November 2024, Safaricom suspended advertisements with the Daily Nation and related publications such as Business Daily due to the publication of Safaricom's violation of its mobile subscribers privacy and other critical coverage of the company.

On 15 November 2024, various civil society organisations including the Kenya Human Rights Commission and Muslims for Human Rights demanded that Safaricom address the specific allegations regarding passing CDRs to security agencies without court orders, manipulation and falsification of records, failing to hand over data regarding extra-judicial actions by state forces, retention of data that Safaricom claimed to have deleted, and developing software with British company Neural Technologies Limited to grant security agencies unfettered access to private consumer data used to track and profile safaricom subscribers.

=== Sim-card fraud ===
Safaricom has been on the spotlight for failing to protect its customers from the frequent fraudulent activities that have seen subscribers lose thousands and even millions of shillings through fraud. Many customers have fallen victims to the sim-swapping fraud, with some claiming to be an inside job, saying it only targets certain people with huge M-pesa balances, The Standard reported. These claims are however unproven. According to DCI , In 2024 Safaricom lost 500 million Kenya shillings to sim-card fraudsters, Connecting Africa reported. In 2023, Safaricom was ordered to pay a customer 452 million Kenya shillings to a customer who lost his M-shwari deposit to fraudsters.

The telecom giant has however been vigilant in combating sim card frauds. In a press statement, Safaricom has claimed to be making efforts to curb this and has reported decline in the fraud activities.

== See also ==
- Safaricom Telecommunications Ethiopia
- Global Partnership for Ethiopia
- Mobitelea Ventures Limited
- List of mobile network operators in Kenya
- List of telecommunications regulatory bodies
