= ForgetMeNot Africa =

ForgetMeNot Africa was created in 2009, when ForgetMeNot Software joined forces with investment company Lonzim Plc to create ForgetMeNot Africa, a subsidiary that's solely focused on providing unified messaging and financial services in Africa, and began deploying its technology on the continent that same year, in Lesotho. Lonzim Plc owns 51% of ForgetMeNot Africa and ForgetMeNot Software own the remainder of the company.

ForgetMeNot Africa works with telecommunication companies to offer unified messaging services, such as email and online chat via standard mobile phones. It sees the market opportunity as the 3.5 billion mobile subscribers in the developing world who could use any SMS capable mobile phone to send email and chat online without needing to upgrade or download any new applications onto their device. Ben Rhodes.

== Products and technology ==
ForgetMeNot Africa's core product is eTXT which runs on the Message Optimiser platform allowing telecommunication companies, enterprises and social networks to offer their users two way interaction on social media sites, as well as by email, instant messaging (IM) via SMS from and to any mobile phone regardless of its make or model.

ForgetMeNot Africa's Message Optimiser platform was awarded 'Best Innovation in a Mobile First Market' at the Meffys in July 2011, and won the 'Innovation in Messaging' award at the 160 Characters Mobile Messaging awards in June 2011.

African Mobile Network Operators using ForgetMeNot Africa's eTXTing platform enable their subscribers to send and receive eTXT messages as an SMS, an email or online chat.

eTXT bridges the gap between PCs and mobile orientated messaging without ever needing to have a PC or Internet access. This is particularly suitable for developing nations where PC and Internet access percentages average in the low single digits.

In February 2011 ForgetMeNot Africa added the Facebook functionality to its Message Optimiser platform. This enabled any mobile phone subscriber to an operator deploying the Message Optimiser technology to access Facebook Chat, update their profiles, ‘like’ their friends’ statuses and comment on threads via SMS.

== Deployments ==
In September 2009 ForgetMeNot Africa helped Econet Telecom Lesotho to more than double the population's access.

Lesotho's highly literate population struggles to access vital information, such as healthcare, travel and educational resources as according to the International Telecommunication Union only 3.4 per cent of the population use the Internet. Expanding the country's access to email via entry level, low end mobile phones improves access to information, communications with friends and family and trade to email by bringing two-way email to their entire mobile customer base.

In May 2010 ForgetMeNot Africa helped Safaricom, Kenya’s largest telecommunications operator, give almost 9 in 10 of the population's mobile phone subscribers access to email and online chat on their standard mobile phones when it rolled out its Kipokezi service.

Prior to the launch of Kipokezi fewer than one in ten Kenyans had accessed the Internet but the new service enabled more than one third of Kenya's population to exchange email and online chat messages. Kenya's number of mobile phone subscriptions has grown from just over 125,000 in 2000 to more than 17 million ten years later.

In September 2010 ForgetMeNot Africa, in partnership with Rapid Communications, deployed its technology with Kenya's yu, the mobile brand of Kenya's third largest telecoms network Essar Telecom Kenya. Using the Message Optimiser technology yu launched the Peperusha service, enabling it to bring mobile email and online chat on first-generation mobile phone handsets to its entire 1.6 million subscriber base.

In October 2010 ForgetMeNot Africa enabled 25 million Nigerians, 40 per cent of the country's mobile subscribers, to access email and online chat on standard SMS-capable mobile phone by deploying its technology with Glo Mobile, part of the Globacom group, Nigeria's largest independent mobile network.

The launch rocketed Nigerians' access to the Internet as previously only 24 million of the country's 150 million population had ever been online.

In November 2010 ForgetMeNot Africa launched its first service in Francophone Africa with Warid Congo, in the Central African state of Republic of the Congo. The launch of the French version of the Message Optimiser technology transformed Warid Congo's 450,000 subscribers' basic mobile phones into virtual smartphones, enabling them to send and receive email and online chat messages on any SMS-enabled mobile phone.

In February 2011 ForgetMeNot Africa's technology was deployed by Econet Wireless Zimbabwe to transform the first generation handsets of its five million mobile phone subscribers into virtual smartphones. In June 2010, only one in eight Zimbabweans (1.4 million people) had access to the internet, according to the International Telecommunication Union. The eTXT service made email correspondence possible as a low-cost solution for large companies and small businesses, unifying both urban and rural areas of Zimbabwe.

ForgetMeNot Africa launched the first internet-free Facebook, email and online chat service for Portuguese speaking Africans when its technology was deployed by Cape Verdean operator T-Mais in November 2011. The deployment of the service, named Ch@t+, enabled T-Mais to provide its 100,000 subscribers with access to mobile internet messaging services across the remote Cape Verdean islands. The launch also opened up internet messaging via SMS to the near 23 million Portuguese speakers across Africa.

ForgetMeNot Africa say further African deployments are scheduled for 2012.

== Benefits to users ==
ForgetMeNot Africa's eTXT service enables rural communities with little or no access to PCs to communicate with each other, and their urban dwelling friends and family by email or chat from a standard mobile phone. Consequently, the eTXT service enables PC users in any country to communicate with people who have no access to a PC but who have a basic SMS capable phone.

Creating, sending and receiving an eTXT is exactly the same as creating, sending and receiving an SMS. It requires minimal learning from the user as it is a natural SMS-based experience. The user can control their new email and IM capability all from their existing handset without the need to upgrade their phone, change their data plan, download any applications or access the Internet from a PC. Emails and Chat can be sent cheaply anywhere in the world and it enables users without a PC to access the benefits of mobile banking, healthcare, travel and educational resources.

== Benefits to deployers ==
Giving subscribers the ability to eTXT drives SMS traffic, generating new revenue with very small levels of expenditure. The Message Optimiser platform that runs the eTXT service is implemented in under four weeks and generally requires no new hardware, license fees or capital expenditure. The service is relevant to nearly all subscribers, helps to reduce churn rate and can attract competitors' subscribers.
