= Michael Joseph (businessman) =

South-African born kenyan businessman

- Citizenship: Kenyan, Irish
- Occupations: Chairman Safaricom, Chairman Kenya Airways
- Employer(s): Safaricom, Kenya Airways
- Successor: Bob Collymore

Michael Joseph is a South African businessman. He was the long serving chairman of Kenya Airways, a position he held from October 2016 to June 2025. He was previously the CEO of Safaricom from July 2000 to November 2010, as founder and CEO, and then again as acting CEO from July 2019 to March 2020. He is also chairman of the M-PESA Foundation and the M-PESA Foundation Academy. He was until recently (October 2017) Vodafone's director of Mobile Money and was responsible for leading the strategic growth and development of M-PESA proposition across the Vodafone footprint.

Joseph was the founding CEO of Safaricom Limited, a Kenyan mobile network operator.
