= Social responsibility =

Ethical framework

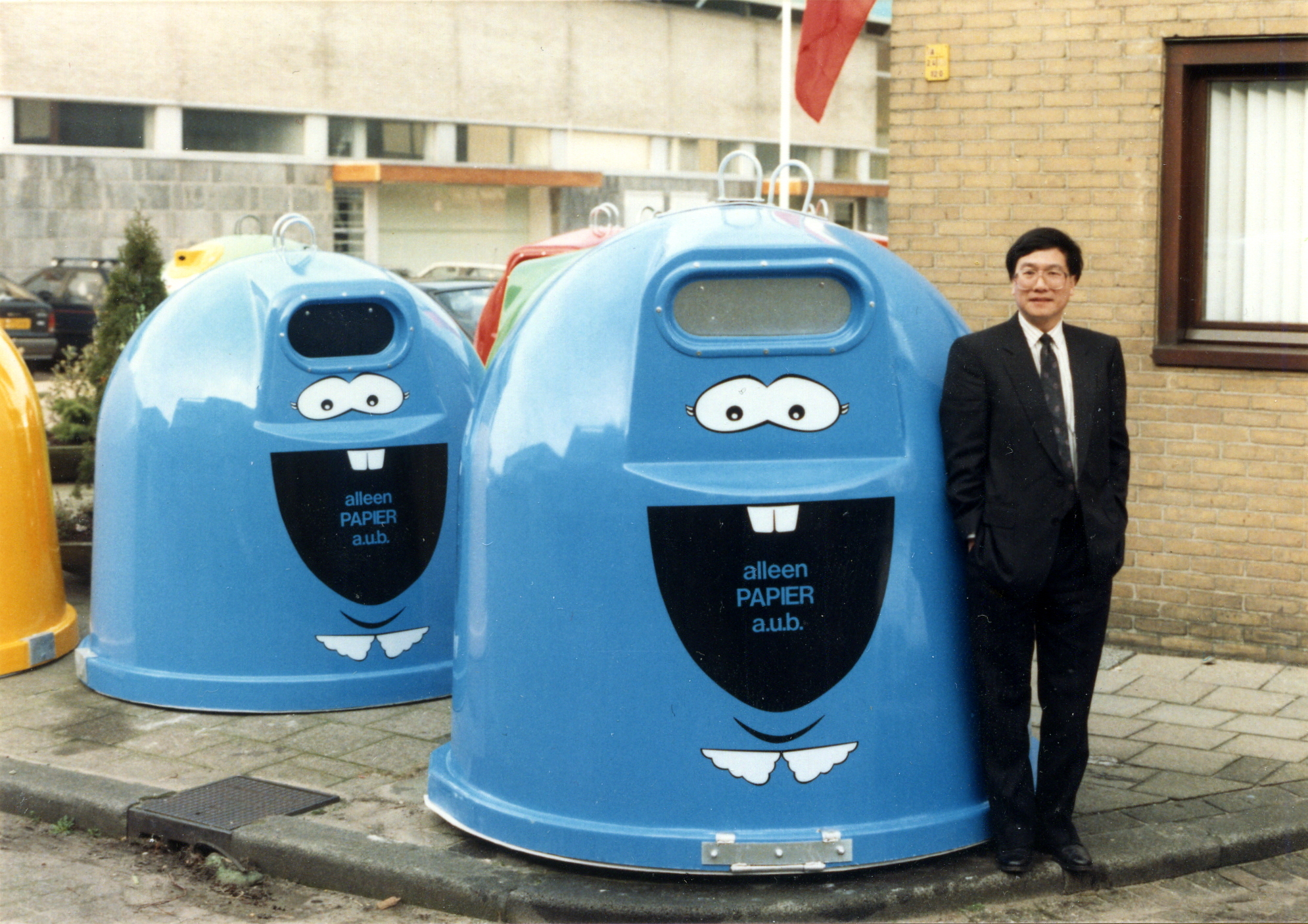
Social responsibility from businesses such as providing recycling bins can in turn provide opportunities for people to be socially responsible by recycling.

Social responsibility is an ethical concept in which a person works and cooperates with other people and organizations for the benefit of the community.

An organization can demonstrate social responsibility in several ways, for instance, by donating, encouraging volunteerism, using ethical hiring procedures, and making changes that benefit the environment.

Social responsibility is an individual responsibility that involves a balance between the economy and the ecosystem one lives within, and possible trade-offs between economic development, and the welfare of society and the environment. Social responsibility pertains not only to business organizations but also to everyone whose actions impact the environment.

== History ==
Writers in the classical Western philosophical tradition acknowledged the importance of social responsibility for human thriving.

=== Aristotle ===
Aristotle determined that "Man is by nature a political animal."

He saw ethics and politics as mutually-reinforcing: a citizen develops the virtues in large part so that they can contribute to making the polis an excellent and stable one. And the purpose of that was so that the polis would be fertile soil in which a thriving, virtuous citizenry could grow (and in order that there could be an appropriate political context in which one could successfully practice virtues like justice which require a political context).

He believed that the polis is meant to be "a community of equals for the sake of a life which is potentially the best." Some of the virtues in his scheme of virtue ethics, like magnificence and justice were inseparable from a sense of social responsibility.

=== Ancient Rome ===
Cicero believed that "In no other realm does human excellence approach so closely the paths of the gods as it does in the founding of new and in the preservation of already founded communities."

In the Meditations of Marcus Aurelius, he wrote that "That which isn't good for the hive isn't good for the bee."

=== Modern times ===
In 1953, the book Social responsibility of the businessman, published by the American economist Howard Bowen was one of the first to address the issue of social responsibility as it relates to business activity.

== Other cultures ==
The Japanese have the concept of giri (義理) which includes and transcends the western conception of social responsibility. In Japanese culture, giri is a permanent state of indebtedness that is honored through a continuous commitment to loyalty and right action, with an emphasis on enduring gratitude.

== Individual social responsibility ==
One can be socially responsible passively, by avoiding engaging in socially harmful acts, or actively, by performing activities that advance social goals. Social responsibility has an intergenerational aspect, since the actions of one generation have consequences for their posterity, and also can be more or less respectful for their ancestors.

Social responsibility can require a degree of boldness or courage. Alexander Solzhenitsyn, for example, believed that "we have gotten used to regarding as valor only valor in war (or the kind that's needed for flying in outer space), the kind which jingle-jangles with medals. We have forgotten another concept of valor—civil valor. And that's all our society needs, just that, just that, just that!".

Another way to be socially responsible is by being careful not to spread information that you have not diligently vetted for its truth. In the modern information environment, "the stakes of credulity are simply too high," says Francisco Mejia Uribe. Socially responsible people have "the moral obligation to believe only what we have diligently investigated." And a socially responsible person "in her capacity as communicator of belief... has the moral responsibility not to pollute the well of collective knowledge and instead to strive to sustain its integrity."

=== Scientists and engineers ===
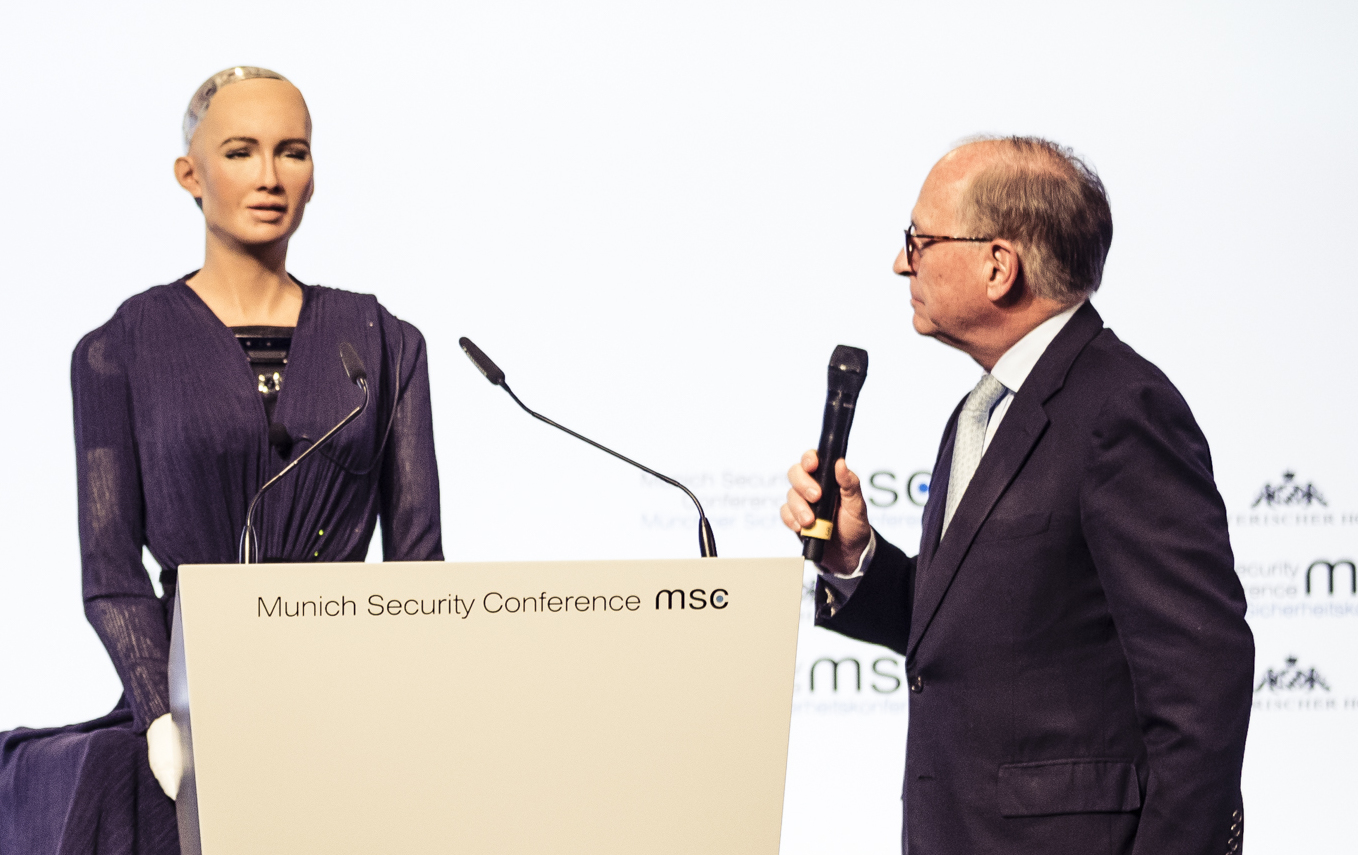
The social responsibility of scientists and engineers can influence how robots are programmed.

Are scientists and engineers morally responsible for the negative consequences that result from applications of their knowledge and inventions? If scientists and engineers take pride in the positive achievements of science and technology, shouldn't they also accept responsibility for the negative consequences related to the use or abuse of scientific knowledge and technological innovations? Scientists and engineers have a collective responsibility to examine the values embedded in the research problems they choose and the ethics of how they share their findings with the public.

Committees of scientists and engineers are often involved in planning governmental and corporate research programs, including those devoted to the development of military technologies and weaponry. Many professional societies and national organizations, such as the National Academy of Sciences and the National Academy of Engineering in the United States, have ethical guidelines (see Engineering ethics and Research ethics for the conduct of scientific research and engineering). Scientists and engineers, individually and collectively, have a special and greater responsibility than average citizens with respect to the generation and use of scientific knowledge.

Some argue that because of the complexity of social responsibility in research, scientists and engineers should not be blamed for all the evils created by new scientific knowledge and technological innovations. First, there is fragmentation and diffusion of responsibility: Because of the intellectual and physical division of labor, the resulting fragmentation of knowledge, the high degree of specialization, and the complex and hierarchical decision-making process within corporations and government research laboratories, it is exceedingly difficult for individual scientists and engineers to control the applications of their innovations. This fragmentation of work and decision-making results in fragmented moral accountability, often to the point where "everybody involved was responsible but none could be held responsible."

Another problem is ignorance. The scientists and engineers cannot predict how their newly generated knowledge and technological innovations may be abused or misused. The excuse of ignorance is stronger for scientists involved in very basic and fundamental research where potential applications cannot be even envisioned, than for scientists and engineers involved in applied scientific research and technological innovation since in such work objectives are well-known. For example, most corporations conduct research on specific products or services that promise to yield profit for share-holders. Similarly, most of the research funded by governments is mission-oriented, such as protecting the environment, developing new drugs, or designing more lethal weapons. In cases where the application of scientific knowledge and technological innovation is well-known a priori, a scientist or engineer cannot escape responsibility for research and technological innovation that is morally dubious. As John Forge writes in Moral Responsibility and the Ignorant Scientist: "Ignorance is not an excuse precisely because scientists can be blamed for being ignorant."

Another point of view is that responsibility falls on those who provide the funding for the research and technological developments (in most cases corporations and government agencies). Because taxpayers provide the funds for government-sponsored research, they and the politicians that represent them should perhaps be held accountable for the uses and abuses of science. In times past scientists could often conduct research independently, but today's experimental research requires expensive laboratories and instrumentation, making scientists dependent on those who pay for their studies.

Quasi-legal instruments, or soft law, has received some normative status in relation to private and public corporations in the United Nations Educational, Scientific and Cultural Organization (UNESCO) Universal Declaration on Bioethics and Human Rights developed by the UNESCO International Bioethics Committee particularly in relation to child and maternal welfare. The International Organization for Standardization will "encourage voluntary commitment to social responsibility and will lead to common guidance on concepts, definitions and methods of evaluation."

== Corporate social responsibility ==
Ethical decision-making by businesses can prevent costly government intervention in those businesses. For instance, if a company follows the United States Environmental Protection Agency (EPA) guidelines for emissions of dangerous pollutants and goes further to involve the community and address concerns the public might have, they might be less likely to have the EPA investigate them. According to some experts, most rules and regulations are formed due to public outcry, which threatens profit maximization and therefore the well-being of shareholders; if there is no outcry, this limits regulation.

Some critics argue that corporate social responsibility (CSR) distracts from the fundamental economic role of businesses; others argue that it is nothing more than superficial window-dressing, such as "greenwashing"; others argue that it is an attempt to pre-empt the role of governments as a watchdog over powerful corporations. A significant number of studies have shown no negative influence on shareholder results from CSR but rather a slightly positive correlation with improved shareholder returns.

In response to these criticisms, recent research shows that CSR is now evaluated less as a simple ethical statement and more as a question of implementation, transparency and measurable results. CSR and ESG have become central in business discussions because they are increasingly linked to risk management, firm value and long-term performance. At the same time, CSR is more credible when it is integrated into different levels of the organization rather than treated only as external communication. This is important because vague or exaggerated social and environmental claims can create greenwashing risks and weaken stakeholder trust. Therefore, CSR becomes more convincing when companies can demonstrate actions rather than only promote a responsible image

While many corporations include social responsibility in their operations, those procuring their goods and services may also independently ensure these products are socially sustainable. Verification tools are available from many entities internationally, for example the Underwriters Laboratories environmental standards, BioPreferred, and Green Seal. A corporate reputation aligned with social responsibility is linked to higher profits, particularly when firms voluntarily report the positive and negative impacts of their social responsibility endeavors.

Certification processes like these help corporations and their consumers identify potential risks associated with a product's lifecycle and enable end users to confirm the corporation's practices adhere to social responsibility ideals. A reputation for social responsibility leads to more positive responses toward a brand's products by inducing a reciprocal desire to help companies that have helped others, an effect that is more prominent among consumers who value helping others and is reduced if consumers doubt a firm's intentions.

== See also ==
- Accountability
- Corporate social responsibility
- Good German
- Inclusive business
- Public opinion
- SA8000
- Shareholder primacy
- Social enterprise
- Social entrepreneurship
- Socially responsible investing
