= Inclusive business model =

Type of business model

An inclusive business model is a type of business model that seeks to create value for low-income communities by integrating them into a company's value chain on the demand side as clients and consumers, and/or on the supply side as producers, entrepreneurs or employees in a sustainable way.

The businesses that design and use these business models can range from multinational corporations to large domestic companies, co-operatives, small and medium-sized enterprises, or even not-for-profit organizations that use business principles—or social business approaches—to achieve their mission.

Since social value creation is integral to how inclusive business models intend to capture value, they differ from corporate philanthropy or corporate social responsibility. Businesses adopting inclusive business models can become inclusive businesses when they succeed in creating intended value and avoiding value destruction.

== Criteria ==
Inclusive business models can be developed and implemented by a wide range of entities, from private corporations (large and small), to state-owned companies, co-operatives, or even not-for-profit organizations, as long as the following criteria are met:

- Human development impact: an inclusive business model contributes to human development by increasing poor people's incomes, improving their access to basic goods and services such as education, health, housing, water and sanitation, contributing to the Sustainable Development Goals and reaching excluded and disadvantaged groups (e.g. women, youth, disabled, ethnic minorities).
- Self-sustainability: an inclusive business model can receive start-up funding from different sources (including grants) but it must be designed to break-even and become self-sustainable over time (profits can be re-invested into the business or distributed to shareholders).
- Environmental impact: at a minimum, an inclusive business model does not have major negative environmental impacts and, at best, contributes directly to environmental sustainability (e.g. by saving resources, reducing carbon emissions, conserving biodiversity, etc.).

== Benefits for business ==
- Generating profits. Business with the poor can sometimes yield higher rates of return than ventures in developed markets. Some microfinance institutions for instance have demonstrated their ability to reap significant profits.
- Developing new markets. The 4 billion people living on less than $8 a day worldwide have a combined income of about $5 trillion. They are willing and able to pay for essential goods and services (such as water, energy and healthcare), but too often they suffer from a 'poverty penalty' and end up paying more than rich consumers. Business models that offer better value for money—or entirely new products and services to improve the lives of the poor—can reap pioneer profits in return.
- Driving innovation. The challenge of developing inclusive business models can lead to innovations that contribute to a company's competitiveness. For example, to meet the poor's preferences and needs, firms must offer new combinations of price and performance. And the pervasive constraints that businesses encounter when doing business with the poor require creative responses. These forces drive the development of new products, services and business models that can catch on in other markets, giving innovative companies a competitive advantage in poor markets.
- Expanding the labour pool. The poor are a large source of labour. The advantages of hiring them as employees go beyond cost savings. With adequate training and well-targeted marketing, the poor can deliver high-quality products and services. Or their local knowledge and connections may place them well to serve other poor consumers in their communities.
- Strengthening value chains. For firms that procure locally, incorporating the poor in business value chains—as producers, suppliers, distributors, retailers and franchisees—can expand supply and lower risk. That allows them to reduce costs and increase flexibility, especially as the local businesses move into more specialized or higher-skill activities such as component production and business services.

== Benefits for the poor ==
Businesses can improve the lives of poor people, contributing broadly to what the United Nations terms 'human development'—expanding people's opportunities to lead lives they value.

- Creating jobs and Increasing incomes, by including poor people in value chains as customers, employees, producers and small-business owners.
- Meeting basic needs', such as food, clean water, sanitation, electricity and health-related services all meet people's basic needs.
- Increasing productivity, through access to products and services—from electricity to mobile telephony, from agricultural equipment to credit and insurance.
- Empowering the poor. All these contributions support the empowerment of poor people, individually and communally, to gain more control over their lives. By raising awareness, by providing information and training, by including marginalized groups, by offering new opportunities and by conferring hope and pride, inclusive business models can give people confidence and new sources of strength to escape poverty using their own means.

As such, inclusive business models can make a significant contribution towards meeting the Sustainable Development Goals (SDGs).

== Constraints ==
Despite opportunities, many businesses are not taking advantage of them because market conditions surrounding the poor can make doing business difficult, risky and expensive. Where poverty prevails, the foundations for functional markets are often lacking, excluding the poor from meaningful participation and deterring companies from doing business with them.

The United Nations Development Programme, in a report titled "Creating Value for All: Strategies for Doing Business with the Poor" (2008), identifies five major market constraints and successful strategies to overcome them:

- Limited market information. Businesses know too little about the poor—what poor consumers prefer, what they can afford and what products and capabilities they have to offer as employees, producers and business owners.
- Ineffective regulatory environments. The markets of the poor lack regulatory frameworks that allow business to work. Rules and contracts are not enforced. People and enterprises lack access to the opportunities and protections afforded by a functioning legal system.
- Inadequate physical infrastructure. Transportation is constrained by the lack of roads and supporting infrastructure. Water, electricity, sanitation and telecommunications networks are lacking.
- Missing knowledge and skills. Poor consumers may not know the use and benefits of particular products, or may lack the skills to use them effectively. Poor suppliers, distributors and retailers may lack the knowledge and skills to deliver quality products and services consistently, on time and at a set cost.
- Restricted access to financial products and financial services. Lacking credit, poor producers and consumers cannot finance investments or large purchases. Lacking insurance, they cannot protect their meagre assets and income against shocks such as illness, drought or theft. And in the absence of transactional banking services, their financing is insecure and expensive.

== Success factors ==
Despite these challenges, a growing number of businesses are operating successfully in poor markets. To do so, they use five core strategies:

- Adapt products and processes. Information and communications technologies have created the possibility for many such adaptations, including mobile banking (m-banking), smart cards (for instance, to buy water) and telemedicine. M-banking has freed banking processes from relying on brick-and-mortar branches and automated teller machines, infrastructure that rarely exists where poor people live. Customers can now wire money, receive remittances, pay for purchases and service their credit, all through their mobile phones. But businesses are also using other technologies, such as for water purification and off-grid electricity production. In addition, some innovative technological approaches are reducing the use of resources—tying the goal of human development to that of environmental sustainability.

Restructuring business processes can be as important as using new technologies. For example, the global spread of telephony is driven by wireless technology. But bringing mobile telephone service to poor people has depended partly on a change in the business process—the move to selling air time on prepaid cards. With 'smart' payment and pricing methods, an inclusive business model can accommodate the cash flow of its customers and suppliers, who are constrained by low and unreliable incomes and a lack of access to financial services.

- Invest to remove market constraints. Investing to remove constraints is cost-effective for business when it creates—or can be made to create—private value that is tangible and capturable, ensuring sufficient benefits to the company. Investing to remove market constraints can create public as well as private value. For example, when a firm educates and trains its employees it creates a more skilled workforce—a shared resource as workers move on to other jobs and companies. This added social value opens up doors for cost-sharing with socially minded funding sources, such as international donors, individual philanthropists, nonprofit social investment funds and governments.
- Leverage the strengths of the poor. The poor are often an inclusive business model's most important partners. By engaging the poor as intermediaries and building on their social networks, a company can increase access, trust and accountability. Those qualities in turn help businesses to nurture their markets and expand participation in their value chains. One model for engaging the poor into one's sales operations is microfranchising. Firms can leverage local knowledge and trust by employing the poor to gather market information, to deliver, collect and service products and to train others. Furthermore, poor people often have the best ideas for creating new products and services that meet other poor consumers' needs. Generally, when the poor take over some tasks in a business model, the transaction costs for the business fall—while the poor benefit from rising income, knowledge and skills and social standing.
- Combine resources and capabilities with others. Like many business models, inclusive business models often succeed by engaging other businesses in mutually beneficial partnerships and collaborations. They also make use of collaborations with nontraditional partners, such as nongovernmental organizations and public service providers. Through such collaborations, businesses can gain access to complementary capabilities and pool resources to work around or remove constraints in the market environment.
- Engage in policy dialogue with governments. Engaging in policy dialogue is an important part of doing business with the poor, where companies are typically first movers and much of the environment for doing business has yet to be built. All market constraints previously mentioned are more or less in the domain of public policy. Policymaking is complex and continual, and businesses can provide good information about the problems and their possible solutions. Sometimes the individual efforts of entrepreneurs and companies to engage with governments can have large implications, such as changing market structures or even opening new markets.

Businesses can also rely on demonstration effects or engage collectively to inform public policy and promote effective regulations in developing countries. Since business engagement in policymaking can be controversial, companies and policymakers need a space to engage in frank yet transparent dialogue about how to improve the business environment. Collaborative efforts can open such a space. Companies operating in the same industry or region often share policy interests. And if they are doing business in ways that contribute to economic opportunity and human development, organizations outside the private sector may have complementary policy interests. Where business models are inclusive, collective action can give businesses a strong and legitimate voice in policymaking.
