= Eco commerce =

Business model

Eco-commerce is a business, investment, and technology-development model that employs market-based solutions to balancing the world's energy needs and environmental integrity. Through the use of green trading and green finance, eco-commerce promotes the further development of "clean technologies" such as wind power, solar power, biomass, and hydropower.

EcoCommerce is an integrated ecological-economical model that provides a means to account for and value land management activities that improves the condition of natural capital and values the output of ecoservices. EcoCommerce is more comprehensive than a compilation or organization of ecosystems service markets as it provides the framework to build an ecological intelligence system that allows the public arena of commerce to define sustainability.
