= Domestic market =

Market where trading happen within a single country

A domestic market, also referred to as an external market or domestic trading, is the supply and demand of goods, services, and securities within a single country. In domestic trading, a firm faces only one set of competitive, economic, and market issues and essentially must deal with only one set of customers, although the company may have several segments in a market. The term is also used to refer to the customers of a single business who live in the country where the business operates. Domestic consumption refers to the consumption of goods and services within the country or area where they were produced.

There are certain limitations when competing in a domestic market, many of which encourage firms to expand abroad. The main reasons why a business would decide to expand abroad are limited market size and limited growth within the domestic market. The European single market aims to integrate member states and other parties into something resembling a domestic market by reducing barriers and cutting red tape.
