= Inclusive business =

An inclusive business is a self-sustainable business entity that productively integrates low-income populations into its value chain. By prioritising value creation over value capture and adopting principles of non-discrimination, inclusive businesses create new economic opportunities for low-income populations but do not necessarily pursue profit maximisation objectives. By means of an inclusive business model, inclusive businesses engage, support and create demonstrable value for low income producers, suppliers, retailers and/or service providers and actively avoid destroying value 'along the path to value creation.'

By emphasising productive integration, inclusive businesses are distinguishable from social businesses developing goods and services specifically for low income populations.

== See also ==
- Inclusive growth
- Social entrepreneurship
- Triple bottom line
- Bottom of the pyramid
