= Anwar Soussa =

Greek businessman and corporate executive

- Citizenship: Greece
- Education: American College of Greece (Bachelor of Science in Business Administration and Management); Concordia University (Master of Science in Business Administration and Management)
- Occupations: Businessman and Corporate Executive
- Years active: 2004 – present
- Known for: Managerial skills
- Title: Regional Director Franco Markets at Airtel Africa. Previously Founding Chief Executive Officer of Safaricom Telecommunications Ethiopia.

Anwar Soussa is a Greek businessman and corporate executive who serves as the Regional Director for Francophone Africa at Airtel Africa. He previously served as the Managing Director and Chief Executive Officer of Safaricom Telecommunications Ethiopia, the Ethiopian subsidiary of the telecommunications and financial multinational Safaricom, based in Nairobi Kenya. Before that, from September 2017 until June 2021, he was the CEO of Vodacom Congo DRC SA, based in Kinshasa and chairman of Vodacash.

== Background and education ==
Anwar is a Greek national. He holds a Bachelor of Science in Business Administration and Management, awarded by the American College of Greece, in Athens, Greece. He also holds a Master of Science in Business Administration and Management, obtained in 1998, from Concordia University, in Montreal, Quebec, Canada.

== Career ==
Anwar has spent a significant part of his 20+-year career in the management of telecommunication networks on the African continent, with stints in the Middle East and Oceania.

After working as a commercial officer for Orascom in the Central African Republic and for Veon in Zimbabwe, Anwar was hired by Digicel in Papua New Guinea, working there as the Commercial Director from 2012 until 2013. He then served as the Chief Operating Officer for MTN Cyprus, based in Nicosia, for 2 years ending 2015.

He was then hired by Airtel as the CEO of their Chadian operation, based in Ndjamena. From there he was transferred to Uganda and served in the same capacity for Airtel Uganda, based in Kampala, between 2016 and 2017.

In 2017 he was hired as managing director of Vodacom DRC, where he is credited with turning that unit into the largest Vodacom operation, outside of South Africa. In 2020 Vodacom DRC exceeded US$500 million in gross revenue for the first time.

== Safaricom Ethiopia ==
Anwar was selected by the consortium that owns Safaricom Telecommunications Ethiopia (STE), which was formerly known as Global Partnership for Ethiopia (GPE), to be the founding managing director of their Ethiopian start-up. He is answerable to the board of STE in Addis Ababa and will report directly to the CEO of Safaricom in Nairobi. Anwar is based in Addis Ababa, the capital city of Ethiopia.

Flowing the expiry of his two-year secondment to Safaricom Ethiopia, Soussa is expected to leave Ethiopia for a yet to be disclosed assignment, on 31 July 2023. Wim Vanhelleputte, previously an executive with MTN Group has been appointed to replace him as CEO of STE, effective 1 September 2023.

== Airtel Africa Group ==
After leaving Safaricom Ethiopia, Anwar joined the Airtel Africa Group where he is the Regional Operations Director for the Francophone markets. The countries that he manages include the Democratic Republic of Congo, Congo Brazzaville, Chad, Gabon, Niger, Madagascar, and Seychelles. He is based in Dubai, United Arab Emirates.

== See also ==
- Emmanuel Hamez
- Wim Vanhelleputte
