= Wim Vanhelleputte =

Belgian business executive

- Born: Belgium
- Citizenship: Belgium
- Education: State University of Ghent (Bachelor of Engineering) (Master of Science in Nuclear & Solid-state Physics); Université libre de Bruxelles (Master of Science in Power Plant Management)
- Occupations: Engineer, Businessman and Corporate Executive
- Years active: 2000s – present
- Known for: Managerial skills, Business record.
- Title: MD and CEO of Safaricom Telecommunications Ethiopia.

Wim Vanhelleputte is a Belgian engineer, businessman and corporate executive, who is the chief executive officer and managing director of Safaricom Telecommunications Ethiopia Plc. He was appointed in June 2023. He took up his current position on 4 September 2023.

He is reported to have ..."extensive leadership experience and deep industry knowledge, having worked in the telecommunications industry across multiple markets in sub-Saharan Africa for over 25 years"....

Before that, from 1 August 2022 until 31 August 2023, he was the Regional Operations CEO of MTN Group's operations and governance issues in four operating subsidiaries in West and Central Africa. The subsidiaries are operating in the Republic of the Congo, Guinea, Guinea-Bissau and Liberia.

== Background and education ==
Vanhelleputte is a Belgian national. He is also reported to be a naturalized Ugandan citizen. He holds a Bachelor of Engineering degree, awarded by the State University of Ghent, in Ghent, Belgium. The same university awarded him a Master of Science degree in Nuclear & Solid-State Physics. He also holds a Master of Science in Power Plant Management, from the Université libre de Bruxelles, in Brussels, Belgium.

== Career ==
Vanhelleputte has engineering and management experience that spans over 25 years, with a significant portion of his career spent in the management of telecommunication networks on the African continent.

His first job was as an associate engineer, based in the Czech Republic, at the European division of Westinghouse Energy Systems. He then transferred to Siemens Atea, an IT company as a project engineer in Zimbabwe, before relocating to Gabon as a residential project manager. He has held senior leadership roles in various other companies including as CEO at Sentel GSM in Senegal, as managing director of TchadMobile in Chad and as general manager at Telcel in Gabon.

Between 2009 and 2015, he served as the CEO for MTN Côte d'Ivoire. He then served as the regional director for Francophone Africa at Airtel Africa and then as cluster CEO for Airtel Congo Kinshasa and Airtel Congo Brazzaville.

He then served a six-year stint as the CEO of MTN Uganda, from 2016 until 2022. During his tenure, he oversaw the renewal of the telco transmission license, the separation of the company's financial services subsidiary into a separate entity and the successful listing of the shares of the company on the Uganda Securities Exchange in an initial public offering (IPO). He was replaced at MTN Uganda by Sylvia Wairimu Mulinge a former executive at Safaricom Plc. and the first female CEO at the Ugandan company.

== Safaricom Ethiopia ==
Vanhelleputte was selected by the board of Safaricom Telecommunications Ethiopia Plc, to replace Anwar Soussa, the founding managing director, whose two-year secondment from Vodacom had come to an end.

== Other considerations ==
Three achievements stand out during his six-year tenure at MTN Uganda.

1. Under his leadership, network subscribers to MTN Uganda increased from 8.5 million to 16 million.
2. During those six years, net annual profits increased from UGX:96 billion (approx. US$25.7 million) to UGX:340 billion (approx. US$91.2 million), a growth of 254 percent.
3. In December 2021, under his leadership, MTN Uganda floated 20 percent of its stock and listed on the Uganda Securities Exchange, in the middle of the COVID-19 pandemic. The IPO raised UGX:535.9 billion (US$151 million).

== See also ==
- Emmanuel Hamez
