= Airtel Networks Limited =

Telecommunications company in Nigeria

Airtel Nigeria
- Type: Subsidiary
- Industry: Telecommunications
- Predecessor: Econet; Zain Nigeria; Celtel Nigeria; Vodacom; Vmobile
- Area served: Nigeria
- Key people: Surendran Chemmikotil (MD and CEO)
- Products: Mobile telephony; Broadband; Internet services
- Parent: Airtel Africa
- Website: www.airtel.com.ng

Airtel Networks Limited (Airtel Nigeria), commonly known as Airtel, is a leading mobile network operator in Nigeria. According to the Subscribers statistics released by Nigerian Communications Commission (NCC) on 30 August 2019, Airtel Nigeria has 26.8% mobile telephone market share and 46.8 million subscribers. The company is a subsidiary of Airtel Africa, the holding firm for Bharti Airtel's operations in 14 countries in Africa.

== Location ==
Airtel Nigeria is headquartered at Plot L2, Banana Island, Ikoyi, Lagos, a major economic nerve-point in Nigeria.

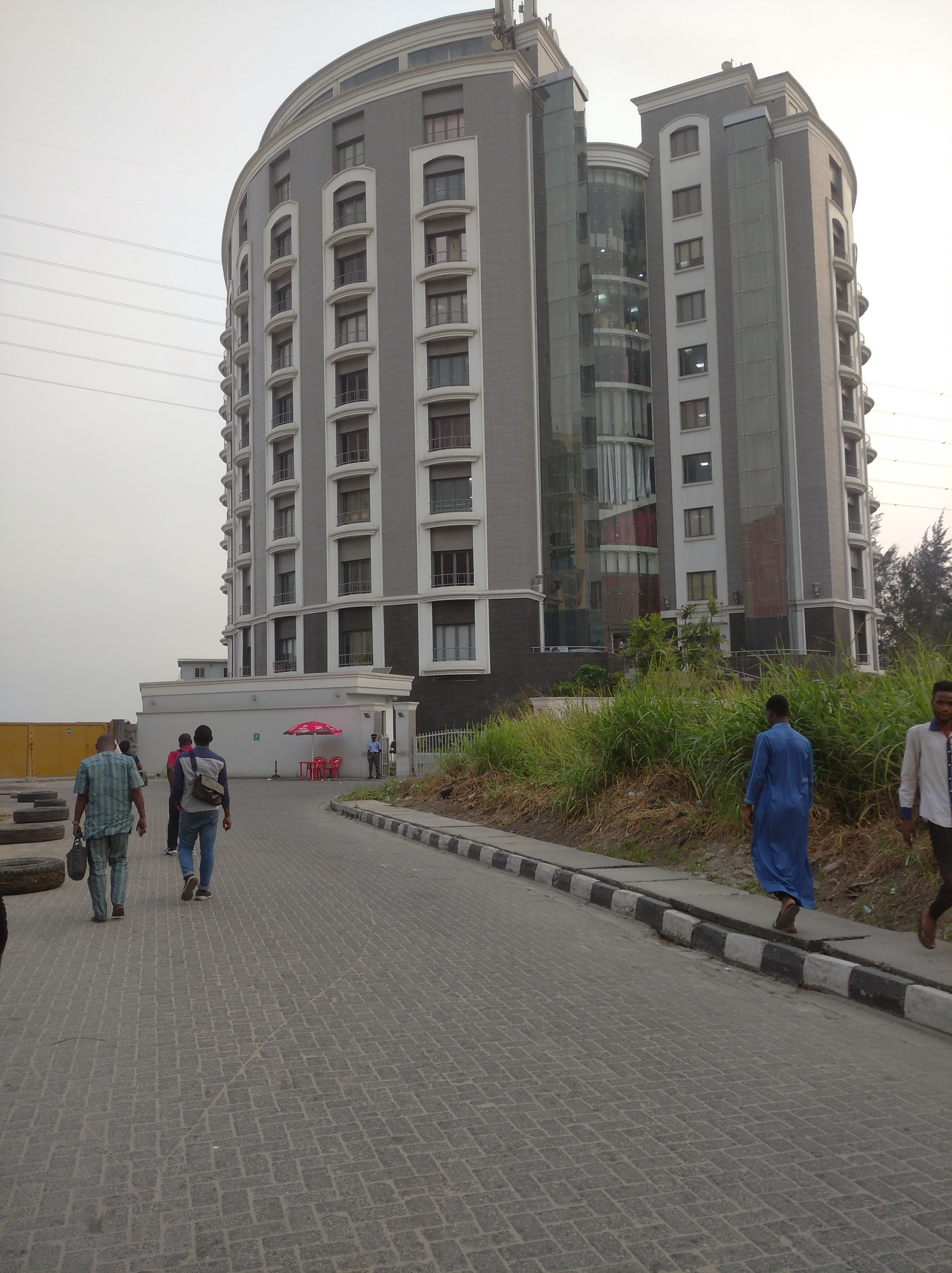
Airtel Nigeria Headquarters, Banana Island, Ikoyi, Lagos.

== History ==
The company was founded in 2001 as Econet Nigeria and was awarded Digital Mobile License (DML) for communication service in Nigeria. It made history on August 5, 2001, by becoming the first telecommunications service provider to launch commercial GSM services in Nigeria. In 2004, Vodacom took charge of the company as management changed hands. Later in 2004, Vee Networks took the reins of the company and became known as Vmobile. In May 2006, Vmobile was acquired by Celtel. In 2008, Zain Group, another telecommunications company acquired all Celtel International's shares of over $3 billion. As a result of this acquisition, all operations of Celtel Africa was rebranded from Celtel to Zain. In 2010, Bharti Airtel, the parent company of Airtel Nigeria, completed the acquisition of Zain Group's Africa business in a $10.7 billion transaction.

== Overview ==
Airtel Nigeria is the second-largest telecommunications company in Nigeria by number of customers, behind MTN Nigeria. It has an estimated 46.8 million subscribers representing 26.8% market share and in terms of mobile internet users, Airtel Nigeria has the second-largest users with 32.4 million subscribers in July 2019.

== Capital Market Listing ==
On July 9, 2019, Airtel Africa, the holding firm of Airtel Nigeria and Bharti Airtel's Africa subsidiary, listed 3,758,151,504 ordinary shares on the main board of the Nigerian Stock Exchange (NSE) at an offer price of ₦363 per ordinary share.

== Governance ==
Segun Ogunsanya is the past managing director and chief executive officer of Airtel Networks Limited in Nigeria since November 2012. Prior to his current appointment, he was the managing director and chief executive officer of Nigerian Bottling Company (NBC) Limited, a subsidiary of Coca-Cola Hellenic Bottling Company Inc. On 6 May 2021, Airtel announced C. Surendran as managing director and chief executive officer of Airtel Nigeria. He is to take over from Mr. Segun Ogunsaya as the managing director with effect from August 1, 2021. He was the past CEO in Airtel India and delivered exceptional performances which brought about increase in the company's revenue in India.
