= Madacom =

Telecommunications and Internet service provider

MADACOM
- Type: ~
- Industry: Telecommunications
- Headquarters: Antananarivo
- Key people: Monsieur Parwez Jugoo, Directeur Général
- Products: Telecommunications services Internet services
- Revenue: ~
- Number of employees: ~
- Website: http://www.madacom.com/

Madacom is a telecommunications and Internet service provider in Madagascar. It is owned by Celtel, an African multinational telecommunications company.
