= James Propa =

- Born: James Kaliisa; Busabala, Uganda
- Occupations: Music executive, digital media consultant, music critic
- Years active: 2010s–present

James Propa (born James Kaliisa) is a Ugandan music executive, digital distribution strategist, and music media personality. He serves as the Artist and Label Partnerships Manager for Christian and Gospel music in Sub-Saharan Africa at Spotify. He previously worked as a digital music analyst and regional consultant for Tidal.

== Early life and education ==
Propa was born and raised in Busabala, a neighborhood in Kampala, Uganda. He pursued formal training in computer science and media studies before transitioning permanently into the East African digital media and entertainment sectors.

== Career ==
=== Digital music and streaming platforms ===
Propa began working in the African music streaming sector during the 2010s, specializing in A&R, digital distribution, catalog licensing, and music publishing. He was hired by Content Connect Africa to serve as an on-the-ground music analyst and consultant for the launch of Tidal Music's partnership with telecommunications firm MTN Uganda. In this capacity, he evaluated local music trajectories and coordinated localized campaign asset rollouts.

In 2022, Propa joined Spotify as the Artist and Label Partnerships Manager for Christian and Gospel music across the Sub-Saharan African region. In August 2023, he co-led Spotify's Afro-Gospel initiatives and masterclasses in Lagos, Nigeria, designed to assist emerging West African artists with playlist optimization and platform optimization strategies. In August 2024, Propa organized the first "Spotify for Artists" Masterclass in Kampala, Uganda, facilitating regional training sessions at the MoTIV creative hub focusing on streaming monetization, digital analytics, and playlist structures for local content creators.

=== Media commentary and criticism ===
Propa has frequently featured in Ugandan print and broadcast media as an entertainment analyst and industry critic. He has frequently advocated for structural formalization within the Ugandan music economy, arguing that gaps in legal infrastructure, royalty splits, and international monetization networks prevent regional audio assets from scaling globally.

His media critiques have drawn public public counters from mainstream industry artists. Following critical assessments of regional music catalog developments, recording artist Bebe Cool publicly contested Propa's authority as a media analyst. In 2022, Propa publicly challenged singer Jose Chameleone regarding his leadership capability as the head of the Uganda Musicians Association (UMA). Propa has also acted as a media mediator during interpersonal conflicts between public artists, commenting extensively on public feuds such as the 2023 dispute between Pallaso and Alien Skin.
