= Uganda Telecommunications Corporation Limited =

Telecommunication company in Uganda

- Type: Parastatal
- Industry: Telecommunications
- Founded: 2000; 26 years ago
- Headquarters: Kampala, Uganda
- Key people: Grace Sekakubo; Chairperson; Maggie Lutwama Mukiibi; Chief Operations Officer
- Services: Telecommunications; IT; Digital TV; Carrier
- Number of employees: 230 (2022)
- Website: Homepage

Uganda Telecommunications Corporation Limited (UTCL), also (UTel), is an information and communication technology network company in Uganda owned by the government of Uganda. UTel acquired the assets and some of the liabilities of the defunct Uganda Telecom Limited (UTL) which was also owned by the Ugandan government. UTL was previously in receivership which it entered after the Libyan company that owned about 69 percent shares abandoned the investment in 2017.

== History ==
Following the Ugandan Parliament's passage of the Communications Act in 1997, the Ugandan parastatal Uganda Posts and Telecommunications Company Limited (UPTCL) was divided into four entities:

- Uganda Communications Commission - the communications industry regulator
- Uganda Post Limited - also known as Posta Uganda
- PostBank Uganda - a government-owned financial institution
- Uganda Telecom - an information technology and communication network company

In June 2000, UTL was privatized when the government divested 51 percent of its shares to Ucom, a consortium formed by Detecon of Germany, Telecel International of Switzerland, and Orascom Telecom Holding of Egypt. The Ugandan government retained 49 percent ownership in UTL.

== Scope of service ==
UTeL is a leading total communications provider with a broad range of services in Uganda, including:

- Fixed voice (copper, CDMA, fixed GSM)
- Mobile voice and data
- Dedicated circuits for data and internet (xDSL, FTTx, leased lines)
- Broadband services (3G, WiMAX, xDSL, FTTx, CDMA, Wi-Fi)
- Data centre services (hosting/housing/backup/failover)

In February 2009, UTL launched an unstructured supplementary service data-based mobile wallet service called "M-SENTE", using software purchased from Redknee Solutions Inc., a Canadian information technology company. In September 2009, UTL became the first Ugandan provider to introduce the solar powered hand-held mobile phone, locally called "Kasana". In July 2011, UTL estimated their own market share of the Ugandan telecommunication industry at about 10 percent.

== Seizure and release of assets ==
In March 2011, the Ugandan government seized Lap Green's 69 percent shareholding in UTL as part of sanctions against the regime of Muammar Gaddafi. After the end of the Libyan civil war in May 2012, the shareholding was returned to Lap Green, ending a period of considerable uncertainty for the carrier. Since then, UTL underwent major restructuring to revive its fortunes.

== Ownership ==
As of October 2018, UTL was a joint venture between Taleology Holdings GIB Limited, a private company based in Nigeria, which owned 67 percent of the company, and the Ugandan government, which owned the remaining 33 percent.

Following the rebrand, starting in February 2022, the ownership structure of Uganda Telecommunications Corporation Limited is as depicted in the table below.

Shareholding In Uganda Telecommunications Corporation Limited (UTCL)
Rank	Shareholder	Percentage	Notes
1	Uganda Ministry of Finance	60.0	
2	Uganda Ministry of ICT	40.0	
	Total	100.0	

== Leadership structure ==
Stephen Kaboyo was the chairman of the board of directors in 2014. The managing director was Mark Shoebridge, who was appointed temporarily on 21 May 2015 as he was leaving the company from his role as chief fixed services officer to lead operations in Vodacom Nigeria. He was re-appointed effective 8 February 2016 upon his return to Uganda to drive the turnaround of the struggling operator.

After the rebrand, effective November 2022, the company chairman is Dr. Grace Ssekakubo and Ramadan Ggobi, Dr. Aminah Zawedde, Tom Sekatwe, Jimmy Adiga, Maximelia Byenkya and Agnes Ojiambo as Directors of the company COO is Margaret Lutwama Mukiibi.

== Parliamentary investigation ==
In November 2016, the parliament of Uganda set up a select committee to investigate alleged mismanagement at Uganda Telecom, including the allegation that UGX:1.5 billion was missing from petty cash through theft from long term staff in the finance department over a period of many years. Many of the finance department staff involved have been dismissed, terminated, or have resigned since this fraud was uncovered in 2016 through audits conducted by the new management. The committee's report was expected within two months.

== Insolvency and Receivership ==
In February 2017, UCom, the government of Libya-owned subsidiary unilaterally pulled out of the struggling company, forcing the Uganda government to assume sole total control. In April the same year, the Uganda government placed the telco under receivership.

In December 2017, Uganda announced plans to sell a majority stake in the troubled company. Nearly a dozen investors from Europe, China, South Africa and the USA expressed interest in acquiring a stake in UTL.

In July 2018, The EastAfrican reported that of the investors who submitted purchase bids, Mauritius Telecom emerged as the only capable, credible, legitimate bidder, with a bid of $45 million upfront, and another $100 million over the next 36 months, for a 69-31 majority shareholding. Discussions were ongoing to close the acquisition. The Uganda Financial Intelligence Authority (FIA), successfully vetted the potential investor.

In a cabinet meeting convened on Monday 1 October 2018 and chaired by President Yoweri Museveni, Taleology Holdings GIB Limited of Nigeria, was selected to operate UTL for the next 20 years. The deal included UTL's total assets, valued at USh148 billion (US$39.5 million), tax waivers, an extended frequency and Uganda's national backbone optic fibre infrastructure. In exchange, Taleology would make a non refundable US$7.1 million (USh27 billion), at signature of the paperwork and another US$63.9 million (USh240 billion) no later than 60 days from that date, otherwise they forfeit the concession. When, in February 2019, Taleology failed to remit the required funding to effect the acquisition, UTL went back on the market and a new buyer was being sought.

On 2 January 2020, Justice Lydia Mugambe of the Civil Division of the High Court of Uganda, appointed Ruth Sebatindira as the Administrator of Uganda Telecom Limited, under a court-appointed receivership since April 2017. Sebatindira took over the administration of UTL from Bemanya Twebaze on 6 January 2020.

== Company rebrand ==
Following the exit of Libya's LAP Green in 2017 and the unsuccessful attempted sale to Nigeria's Taleology Holdings in 2019, the Uganda government decided to nationalize the insolvent (bankrupt) UTL.

In April 2021, the government of Uganda incorporated Uganda Telecommunications Corporation Limited (UTCL), also referred to UTel. In February 2022, UTel signed a sale and purchase agreement with the insolvent UTL to acquire all UTL's assets and some of their liabilities for a total consideration of USh256.9 billion (approx. US$65.7 million), to be paid over 16 months, with the last installment due in June 2023. This is in addition to the US$15.6 million debt owed to Trade and Development Bank that the government had settled in 2020 on behalf of UTL. This brought the total price to US$81.3 million (approx. USh316 billon). The assets acquired include UTL's 2G, 3G and 4G frequency spectrum awarded by Uganda Communications Commission, the national industry regulator.

In November 2022, the then UTL receivership administrator, Ruth Sebatindira, handed over the company assets to the new shareholders represented by the State Minister of Finance for Investments, Evelyn Anite. Other assets exchanged included land, buildings, and internet transmission network including underground and overhead cables, as well as communication towers. With the transfer of assets, UTL ceased to exist.

== Developments ==
In October 2024, the government of Uganda signed binding agreements with Rowad Capital Commercial (RCC), an investment company based in Dubai, the United Arab Emirates, whereby RCC acquires 60 percent in UTel.

== See also ==
- MTN Uganda
- Airtel Uganda
- List of mobile network operators in Uganda
