= K2 Telecom =

Telecommunications company in Uganda

- Company type: Private
- Industry: Telecommunications
- Founded: 2013; 13 years ago
- Headquarters: Ring Road, Katwe, Kampala Uganda
- Key people: Arthur Mawanda Sekamanya; Chief Executive Officer
- Services: Telecommunications; IT; Digital TV; Carrier
- Website: www.k2telecom.ug

K2 Telecom is a telecommunications network company in Uganda. It was established in January 2013. By November 2015, the company's estimated its number of subscribers at about 200,000.

== History ==
K2 was launched by Kabaka Ronald Muwenda Mutebi II, on 31 December 2012. The telco needed one million subscribers to break even. However, K2 could not build up the numbers required to stay afloat.

In May 2018, with the phone company owing the Uganda Revenue Authority (URA) USh96 million (US$26,000) in unpaid taxes, URA closed K2 Telecom down. The taxes had accumulated since 2013.

Airtel Uganda took over the 100,000 customers that K2 had left in July 2018. K2 Telecom continued to operate as a "virtual telecom", receiving a royalty on services rendered to its customers. This partnership is expected to continue, at least until calendar year 2019.

== See also ==
- List of mobile network operators in Uganda
