= Kefeta =

Economic development programs

Kefeta (Amharic: to elevate) is a 5-year, $60M USAID funded integrated Youth Activity programme led by Amref Health Africa. The primary goal is to empower youths to advance their own economic, civic, and social development by actively promoting development within their communities and contributing to the country’s peace and prosperity.

== History ==
The Ethopian youth (between 15 and 29 years) occupies 33.8% of the Urban population, however, secondary (29%) and tertiary (13.3%) education completion rates are very low in comparison to the 76% and 30% globally. To reduce this, the 5-year (August 2021 - August 2026) Kefeta Project was created to strengthen the youth ecosystem in Ethiopia with integrated, multi-sectoral, youth-centred programming.

In September 5, 2024, The United States Government through its Agency for International Development (USAID) during the two-day Youth Development Learning Forum launched the Kefeta National Youth Saving and Credit Cooperatives (SACCO) at the Skylight Hotel. Scott Hocklander, the USAID Mission Director, in his keynote speech laid emphasis on how the access to credit and finance will reduce the restriction that limits the youths from participating in the future of Ethopia.

In the Clinton Global Initiative (CGI) 2024 Annual Meeting, the Kefeta Project received a €2.4 million (USD $2.7 million) digital boost as part of a new two-year Commitment to Action backed by funding from Vodafone Foundation (€1.6m) and USAID and Amref (equivalent to €760,000 in kind), supported with value-in-kind from Safaricom. To foster Ethiopian youth empowerment and drive socio-economic growth, the partnership is establishing digital hubs and business incubators while expanding access to e-learning, vocational training, and essential information.

== Achievements ==
The objective of Kefeta is to benefit the lives of at least 2 million Ethiopian youth in 18 cities over a period of 5 years. According to Amhref, this objective is grouped into three categories: Increase youth capacity for advocacy and agency, Create new economic opportunities for youth, and Expand youth access to essential services that are more youth friendly.

The following are notable achievements of Kefeta in the past years:

- Provision of seed grants and low-interest for startups through Kefeta National Youth Saving and Credit Cooperatives (SACCO).
- Establishment of a youth coalition that involves different, new and existing interest groups in higher education, schools, workplaces and out-of-school settings.
- It has established a network of Private and International partners drawn from different sectors which includes Johns Hopkins Center for Communication Programs, Arizona State University, Safaricom Ethiopia, Vodafone Foundation, Awash Bank, International Youth Foundation, as well as many others, creating diverse jobs and training opportunities.
