= WeFarm =

Peer-to-peer network for smallholder farmers

Wefarm was a peer-to-peer knowledge sharing social network for smallholder farmers in the developing world. The network enabled users to ask and answer questions and share tips about agriculture and business, via SMS or online, enabling farmers in rural areas without internet access to share information. Wefarm claimed to be the world's largest farmer-to-farmer network. It raised more than $10m in venture capital before going out of business in 2022.

== History ==
Wefarm was developed as a project in 2010 by the Cafédirect Producers Foundation (CPF), a British charity that works to support smallholder tea, coffee, and cocoa farmers and their producer organizations to build innovative, community-driven projects.

Wefarm was piloted, tested, and developed in 2011 and 2012 as a CPF project with funding from the Nominet Trust. This initial prototype of the system was tested in partnership with smallholder farming organizations in Peru, Kenya, and Tanzania.

In 2012 Wefarm won the Knight News Challenge, run by the Knight Foundation, providing support to build a more robust, scalable version of the proof of concept system. In 2014 Wefarm was an overall winner of the Google Impact Challenge, providing funding to launch Wefarm in several different countries around the world and take it to scale.

In October 2018 Wefarm announced it had reached over 1.1 million users across Kenya, Uganda, and Peru with plans to expand into the rest of Africa in 2019, beginning with Tanzania.

== Technology ==
The service is free to use and only requires a mobile phone to send and receive SMS messages – technology which is tried-and-tested and widely used by farmers in the developing world. Farmers text questions to a local number; Wefarm uses machine learning algorithms to identify the most appropriate responders, and transmits the message to those users with similar interests in the area, who reply. Although the platform also exists online, over 95 percent of users choose to use it offline. Farmers using the service typically receive three to five local answers to their inquiries within a couple of hours, and often farmers from other countries begin to send advice within 24 hours.

== Business model ==
In January 2015 Wefarm was launched as a social enterprise subsidiary of CPF, with a for-profit business model to achieve long-term financial sustainability and scalability. Wefarm plans to partner with local, national, and international companies who want to increase sustainability and transparency in their supply chains and access isolated farming markets.

== See also ==
Mobile technology in Africa
