= Sylvia ElSheikh =

- Occupation: Marketing executive
- Employer: MTN Uganda
- Title: Chief Marketing Officer

Sylvia ElSheikh is a Ugandan-based marketing executive. She has been the Chief Marketing Officer of MTN Uganda since July 2025.

Before joining MTN Uganda, ElSheikh was Chief Marketing Officer of Airtel Zambia from 2022 to 2025. She previously held several positions at MTN Sudan, including Chief Marketing Officer from 2016 to 2022, Senior Manager for Segment Pricing and Acquisition from 2015 to 2016, and Value-Added Services Manager from 2011 to 2014.

In 2023, she was identified as Marketing Director of Airtel Zambia in connection with The Voice Africa competition.

In October 2025, ElSheikh spoke at the launch of the third phase of the MTN Foundation Changemakers Initiative in Kampala.
