= Emmanuel Hamez =

French corporate executive

- Born: c. 25 December 1969 (age 56); France
- Citizenship: France
- Occupations: Businessman, corporate executive
- Years active: 1980–present
- Title: Managing Director and Chief Executive Officer of Airtel Rwanda

Emmanuel Hamez is a French businessman and corporate executive who serves as the managing director and chief executive officer of Airtel Rwanda, since September 2021. For the four years before his current assignment, he was the CEO of Airtel's subsidiary in the Democratic Republic of the Congo.

== Career ==
Hamez has an extensive long-term career in the telecommunications business on the African continent, exceeding 20 years. In the early 2000s, he was the group operations manager of Celtel Africa, based in the Netherlands. He was also the managing director of the Celtel subsidiary in the Republic of the Congo (Congo Brazzaville). At one time, he was the Group Chief Technical Officer of Sudani Sudan, based in Khartoum. He was then promoted to chief executive officer of Sudani Mobile.

He then served as the managing director of Expresso Senegal. Later, he served as the chief executive officer of Econet Leo in Burundi, based in Bujumbura.

In 2017, he was hired by Airtel DRC, as their CEO, serving there for four years until September 2021. He is reported to have grown Airtel's customer base in that country, during his tenure there.

As CEO of Airtel Rwanda, Hamez replaced Amit Chawla, who resigned in July 2021. Hamez is based in Kigali, Rwanda's capital and largest city. As of December 2020, Airtel Rwanda serviced 4,057,335 customers, accounting for 38.6 percent market share among the mobile network providers in the country.

== See also ==
- Anwar Soussa
