= List of mobile network operators in Uganda =

Mobile network operators in Uganda

This is a list of mobile network operators in Uganda:

- MTN Uganda
- Airtel Uganda
- Talkio Mobile
- UTel
- Hamilton Telecom
- Lycamobile Uganda
- Roke Telkom Uganda

Note: K2 Telecom operates as a component of Airtel Uganda.

== Customer base ==
As of June 2017, there were an estimated 20.4 million mobile subscribers out of an estimated population of 39.6 million; a 51.5 percent penetration rate. By March 2018, the number of mobile phone users had increased to 24.8 million, a 70.9 percent penetration rate. As of June 2020, the number of mobile telephone customers were estimated at 25.5 million, as reported by the Daily Monitor newspaper. That figure had increased to 26.5 million at the end of September 2020.

As of 31 March 2017, Uganda had the 18th highest Internet usage rate in Africa (out of 58 countries). The country had 13,023,114 Internet users out of a population of 41,652,938, bringing the Internet penetration rate to 31.3 percent. As of September 2020, Uganda recorded 20.1 million Internet users, out of an estimated mid-year population of 41.58 million, bringing internet penetration to 48.3 percent, nationwide.

As of 31 March 2022, according to the Uganda Communications Commission (UCC), there were a total of 30.6 million active telephone lines in the country. The mid-year national population was estimated 44.2 million people. This calculates at 69 active lines per 100 Ugandans or 80 percent for Ugandans aged 15 and above.

== Market share ==
The table below illustrates the market share of each of the major mobile network operators in the country, as of December 2021.

Market share among mobile network operators in Uganda
Rank	Name of operator	Millions of customers	Market share (%)
1	MTN Uganda	16.7	47.5
2	Airtel Uganda		
3	UTel		
4	Lycamobile		
4	Roke Telkom Uganda		
5	SmileTelecom Uganda		
	Total	35.2	100.00

- Note: Totals may be off, due to rounding.

When Africell exited Uganda, after 7 October 2021, a total of 3.3 million mobile subscribers in Uganda were up for grabs between the remaining four mobile network operators in the country.

== See also ==
- Uganda Communications Commission
- List of companies based in Uganda
- Economy of Uganda
