= Shameel Joosub =

South African businessman

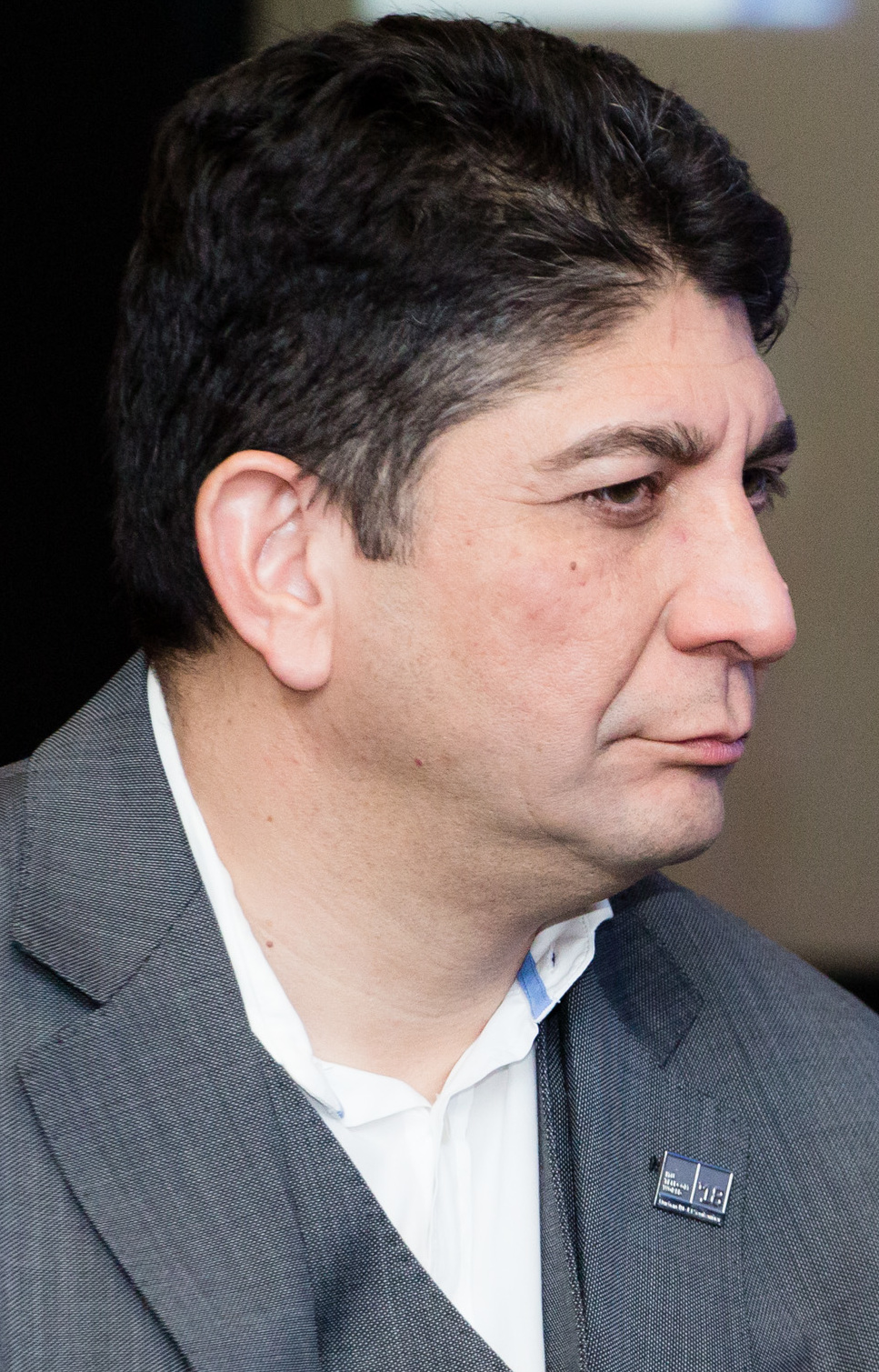
- Joosub, 2018
- Born: Mohamed Shameel Aziz Joosub; Laudium, Transvaal, South Africa
- Education: University of South Africa (BAcc); University of Southern Queensland (MBA)
- Occupation: CEO of Vodacom
- Board member of: Vodacom (2012–present); Safaricom (2017–present)

Mohamed Shameel Aziz Joosub is a South African businessman and head of Vodacom, a South African mobile communications company with over 55 million customers, since March 2013.

== Biography ==
Joosub was born in Laudium, Transvaal. Joosub has a Bachelor of Accounting Science degree from the University of South Africa, and a Master of Business Administration degree from the University of Southern Queensland. Before Joosub became CEO of Vodacom, he spent eighteen months as head of Vodafone España.

He was mentored by Alan Knott-Craig, the founder of Vodacom, who was later the CEO of rival operator Cell C.

Joosub is a board member of Vodacom and Safaricom, positions he has held since 2012 and 2017, respectively.
