= Segun Ogunsanya =

Nigerian electrical and electronics engineer and business executive

- Born: Segun Ogunsanya; 1966 (age 59–60); Ogun State, Nigeria
- Education: Obafemi Awolowo University (Bachelor of Science in Electrical and Electronic Engineering); Institute of Chartered Accountants of Nigeria (Chartered Accountant)
- Occupations: Engineer and corporate executive
- Years active: 1995 - present
- Title: Chief executive officer of Airtel Africa: designate, effective 1 October 2021.
- Predecessor: Raghu Mandava

Segun Ogunsanya is the managing director and chief executive officer of Airtel Nigeria, subsidiary of the Indian telecommunications conglomerate, with subsidiaries in 14 Sub-Saharan African countries.

In April 2021, Ogunsanya was appointed as the designated chief executive officer of Airtel Africa, the African subsidiary that includes all the 14 sub-Saharan African markets. His appointment to this position took effect from 1 October 2021.

== Education ==
Ogunsanya holds a Bachelor's degree in Electrical and Electronic Engineering obtained from the University of Ife (now Obafemi Awolowo University), in 1987. He is also a Chartered Accountant, recognized by the Institute of Chartered Accountants of Nigeria.

== Career ==
In 1999, he served as general manager and chief executive of Coca-Cola Ghana and later as the chief executive officer of Coca-Cola Sabco, Kenya, in 2010. He was managing director and head of retail banking operations of Ecobank Transnational Inc. from 2008 to 2009.

Ogunsanya was the managing director at Nigerian Bottling Company Plc from September 2011, to December 2012. He was appointed CEO of the Nigerian operation of Bharti Airtel, on 26 November 2012.

In April 2021, he was designated as the next managing director and chief executive office of Airtel Africa Plc., effective 1 October 2021. He will be succeeded by C. Surendran as Managing Director and Chief Executive Officer of Airtel Nigeria with effect from 1 August 2021. In his new position, Ogunsanya will replace Raghu Mandava, who will go into retirement. Mandava will be available to assist the board, the chairman and the CEO of Airtel Africa Plc., as needed, for the nine months beginning October 2021.
