= Sylvia Mulinge =

Kenyan businesswoman and corporate executive

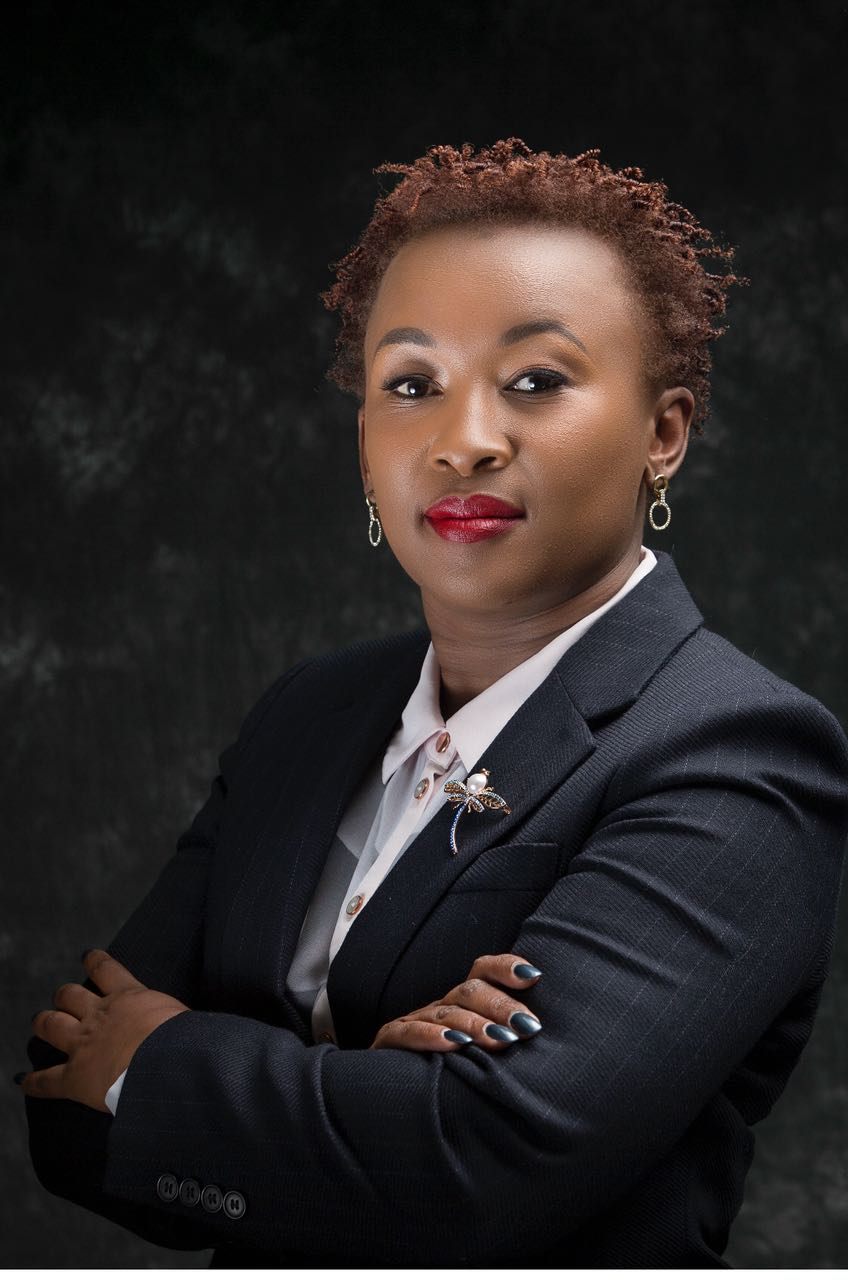
- Sylvia Mulinge, CEO of MTN Uganda
- Born: c. 1977 (age 48–49); Kenya
- Citizenship: Kenyan
- Education: University of Nairobi (BSc in Food Science & Technology)
- Occupation: Corporate executive
- Years active: 2004–present
- Title: Chief executive officer at MTN Uganda
- Predecessor: Wim Vanhelleputte

Sylvia Wairimu Mulinge (née Sylvia Wairimu) is a Kenyan businesswoman and corporate executive. Since 1 October 2022, she has served as the chief executive officer of MTN Uganda, replacing Wim Vanhelleputte, who was promoted to regional executive responsible for operations in Congo-Brazzaville, Guinea-Bissau, Guinea-Conakry and Liberia.

Before that, from November 2018 until September 2022, she served as the chief customer officer at Safaricom, reporting directly to the chief executive officer of the telecommunications company.

Previously, from 1 October 2018 until 2 November 2018, she served as the director of special projects at Safaricom.

Before that, she was the director of the consumer business unit at Safaricom, the largest telecommunications company in Kenya.

== Background and education ==
Mulinge was born in Kenya and attended St. Xaviers Primary School (1983-1990) in the town of Nakuru, and Mary Mount Secondary School (1991-1994) for her elementary and secondary education. She studied at the University of Nairobi, graduating in 2000 with a Bachelor of Science degree in Food Science and Technology.

== Career ==
Mulinge began her career in August 2004, at Unilever, the European consumer products conglomerate, working as the assistant regional brand manager in the laundry division, based in Durban, South Africa. After nine months in South Africa, she was transferred to Kenya, as the brand manager for Sunlight, a Unilever brand. She worked there for another nine months, from May 2005 until January 2006, based in Nairobi.

In February 2006 she was hired by Safaricom Limited as the manager responsible for the company's pre-pay product, working in that capacity until November 2007, when she was promoted to the rank of head of retail, in which position she served until August 2009. For 21 months, from August 2009 until April 2011, she worked as the head of Safaricom Business, responsible for sales. In May 2011, she was promoted to general manager for Enterprise Business, working in that capacity for the next four years. In May 2015, she was promoted to the position of director of consumer business at Safaricom. At Safaricom, she rose through the ranks to become a member of the senior management team at the company.

== Other considerations ==
In 2014, Mulinge was named among the "Top 40 Women Under 40 in Kenya 2014" by Business Daily Africa, a business newspaper published by the Nation Media Group.

In April 2018, Mulinge was named the chief executive officer-designate at Vodacom Tanzania, replacing Ian Ferrao. The position is based in Dar es Salaam, Tanzania. The appointment was effective 1 June 2018.

In September 2018, Vodacom Tanzania announced that the Tanzanian authorities had declined to issue Mulinge a working permit. The company said at the time that it would seek another individual for the position. Effective 1 October 2018, she was reassigned as the director of special projects at Safaricom, reporting directly to the company CEO.
