= Ruth Sebatindira =

Ugandan corporate and tax lawyer

- Born: 1973 (age 52–53); Kampala, Uganda
- Education: Makerere University (Bachelor of Laws); Law Development Centre (Diploma in Legal Practice); University of Manchester (Master of Laws)
- Occupations: Lawyer and corporate administrator
- Title: Former administrator of the Uganda Telecom Limited (July 2020 - November 2022)

Ruth Sebatindira is a Ugandan corporate and tax lawyer who, effective January 2020, was the administrator of Uganda Telecom Limited (UTL), a government-owned telecommunications company, under court administration since April 2017. She concluded her administration of UTL in November 2022 when she handed over to Evelyn Anite, the State Minister for Privatization, representing the new shareholders following the rebrand of UTL to Uganda Telecommunications Corporation Limited (UTCL).

== Background and education ==
Ruth Sebatindira was born in Kampala, Uganda, in 1973.

She holds a Bachelor of Laws degree, obtained from Makerere University, Uganda's oldest and largest public university. She also holds a postgraduate Diploma in Legal Practice, awarded by the Law Development Centre, in Kampala, Uganda's capital city. Her Master of Laws degree was obtained from the University of Manchester, in the United Kingdom.

== Career ==
Sebatindira was called to the bar in 1997, and started her career as an associate at Kalenge, Bwanika, Kimuli & Company, Advocates in Kampala, where she worked for five years. She then worked at Deloitte Uganda as Senior Tax Advisor until 2003, when she founded Ligomarc Advocates. She is the partner in charge of tax and infrastructure at Ligomarc Advocates.

In 2003, Sebatindira founded Ligomarc Advocates, a Kampala-based law firm, as a solo practice. Later others joined the practice, and as of January 2020, the firm has four partners, 18 lawyers and a total staff of 45.

Her work in the 21st-century has included corporate insolvency, shareholder disputes, lender enforcement actions, tax advisory services, intellectual property and commercial projects negotiations and contracts. As of January 2020, she is actively involved in advising clients on tax implications in financing agreements, oil agreements, energy transactions and infrastructure development.

On 2 January 2020, Justice Lydia Mugambe of the Civil Division of the High Court of Uganda appointed Sebatindira as the Administrator of Uganda Telecom Limited, a parastatal company in court-appointed receivership since April 2017. Sebatindira took over the administration of UTL from Bemanya Twebaze on 6 January 2020.

== Memberships and affiliations ==
Sebatindira is a member of the Uganda Law Society, the East Africa Law Society, the International Bar Association, the International Fiscal Association, and the Association of International Petroleum Negotiators.

== Other considerations ==
She served as the president of the Uganda Law Society from 2013 until 2016. She served as founding chairperson of the Women Lawyers Committee at the Uganda Law Society in 2011. She is a Commissioner at the Judicial Service Commission, which advises the President of Uganda on the appointment of judges.
