= Vmobile =

Vmobile was a Nigerian mobile phone network provider with close to a million subscribers in 2004. The company was previously owned by Econet Wireless Nigeria, but after a shareholder dispute was purchased (for a month) by Vodacom of South Africa. The Vodacom deal was short-lived, and the operator soon thereafter began trading as VMobile Nigeria, owned by Vee Networks Limited. The name Vee was based on Vee from Vodacom after Vodacom pulled out of the deal. Vodacom's South African staff was retained by the Nigerian Investors, to run the now called VMobile network. Willem Swart was appointed as CEO, with several previous Econet staff as directors.

The company claimed that all investors were Nigeria-based. They included the state governments of Lagos, Delta, and Akwa Ibom. On April 16, 2006, Celtel made a conditional offer for Vmobile and in May 2006, Vmobile was bought by Celtel for US$1.005. billion after Celtel acquired a controlling stake of 65% in Vmobile

During its time, Vmobile branded itself as the network for the Nigerian people, with the catchphrase being "it's all about you".
