= Smile Telecom =

Ugandan telecommunications company

Smile Communications Uganda
- Trade name: Smile Uganda
- Type: Private Subsidiary
- Industry: Telecommunications
- Founded: November 2009
- Headquarters: Kampala, Uganda, Kampala, Uganda
- Area served: Uganda
- Products: 4G LTE, VoLTE, Broadband
- Services: Mobile services, Internet services, Telecommunications information technology carrier
- Revenue: US$44.9 million
- Number of employees: 113
- Parent: Smile Telecoms Holdings

Smile Communications Uganda (SCU) is a telecommunications company operating in Uganda. Smile Communications Uganda (SCU) was established in November 2009 and launched its 4G LTE operations in June 2013 in Kampala, the capital and largest city of Uganda. The company operates as a subsidiary of Smile Telecoms Holdings, a Mauritius-based pan-African telecommunications group. SCU is a subsidiary of Smile Telecoms Holdings, a Mauritius-based pan-African telecommunications group with operations in Nigeria, Uganda, Tanzania, the Democratic Republic of the Congo, and South Africa.

== Services and Technology ==
Smile Communications Uganda specializes in providing 4G LTE services and broadband communications. SCU's voice-over-LTE, called "VoLTE", is compatible with modern smartphone technology, allowing customers to make voice calls over the LTE network. The company positions itself as providing "affordable, high-quality and easy-to-use broadband access and communication services to customers across Africa".Smile delivers affordable, high-quality and easy-to-use broadband access and communication services to customers across Africa.

== Corporate Structure ==
The company operates within the broader Smile Telecoms Holdings network, which includes telecommunications operations across several African countries. The company is a subsidiary of Smile Telecoms Holdings, a South African telecommunications conglomerate, whose subsidiaries include: (a) Smile Telecom (Nigeria) (b) Smile Telecom (Tanzania) (c) Smile Telecom (South Africa) and (d) Smile Telecom (Uganda).

== See also ==
- List of mobile network operators in Uganda
