= Praekelt Foundation =

Praekelt.org
- Founded: 2007
- Founder: Gustav Praekelt, Robin Miller
- Origins: Praekelt Consulting
- Region served: Sub-Saharan Africa
- Website: www.praekelt.org

Praekelt.org is an African nonprofit organization dedicated to using mobile technology to improve the lives of people living in poverty. It was founded in 2007 as an offshoot of Praekelt Consulting.

Notable projects that the organization is involved in include:

- Young Africa Live, a mobile community where young people can talk candidly and learn about love, intimate relationships, sexual intercourse and HIV/AIDS
- Project Masiluleke (Zulu for "let us advise" or "may we give counsel"), a campaign to promote AIDS awareness using "Please Call Me" messages, in partnership with the PopTech Accelerator and other companies
- TxtAlert, an appointment reminder system for people on chronic medication
- Yoza, a project to promote youth literacy using short cellphone stories, or m-novels, was developed in conjunction with the Shuttleworth Foundation
- MomConnect, an application for pregnant women

== See also ==
- Mobile technology in Africa
- mHealth
