= MomConnect =

South African health care initiative

MomConnect is an initiative of the South African National Department of Health produced by the Praekelt Foundation. It uses cell phone based technology to support maternal health. It is available in all the 11 official South African languages. NurseConnect is a related project for maternity staff. It is the only nationally scaled mHealth platform in Africa.

It was launched by Aaron Motsoaledi in August 2014. More than 900,000 pregnant women signed up for weekly texts by December 2016. A specialist HIV service was started in 2017. The weekly SMS messages continue until the baby's first birthday.

Pregnancies can be easily and quickly registered in the public health system using the system. The calls are free. Nearly 2 million pregnant women and new mothers have used it. From December 2017, it was made available on WhatsApp which allows richer and real-time interaction and makes delivery of personal messages more secure and affordable.

The Helpdesk makes use of machine learning to help operators address frequently asked questions. The WhatsApp’s built-in location-based services enables users to see their nearest clinics.

In its first five years it had over 2.7 million users, about 80% of pregnancies within the public sector. The helpdesk receives between 1000 and 7000 messages a day.
