= Bemanya Twebaze =

Ugandan lawyer

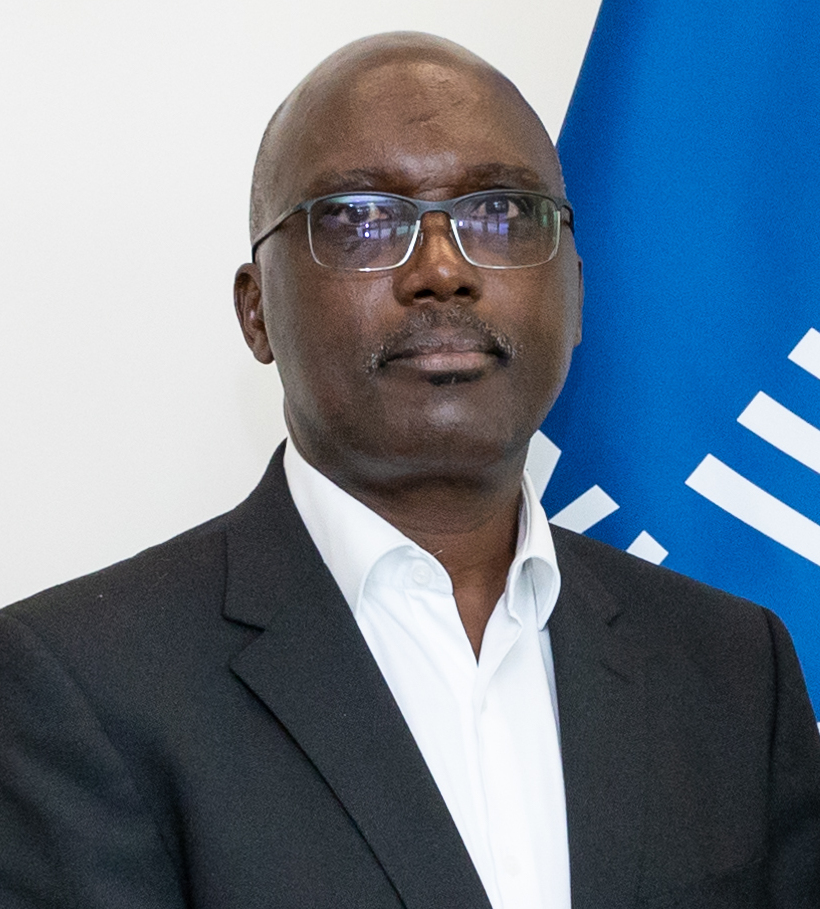
- Bemanya Twebaze in 2022
- Born: Western Region, Uganda
- Citizenship: Uganda
- Education: Makerere University (Bachelor of Laws); Law Development Centre (Diploma in Legal Practice); Eastern and Southern African Management Institute (Master of Business Administration)
- Occupations: Lawyer and Corporate Executive
- Years active: 1994 — present
- Known for: Management
- Title: Director General of the African Regional Intellectual Property Organization

Bemanya Twebaze is a Ugandan lawyer and corporate executive, who currently serves a four-year term as Director General of the African Regional Intellectual Property Organization (ARIPO). Previously, from 2012 to 2020, he was Uganda's Registrar General and Official Receiver of the Uganda Registration Services Bureau.

== Education ==
He holds a Bachelor of Laws, awarded by Makerere University, in Kampala, Uganda's capital and largest city. He also holds a Diploma in Legal Practice from the Law Development Centre, also in Kampala. His Master of Business Administration was obtained from the Eastern and Southern African Management Institute.

== Career ==
Mr. Twebaze originally worked as a lawyer in the areas of commercial law, business registration, intellectual property and insolvency, with experience in managing and concluding the liquidation of large parastatals.

In his role as Registrar General, he worked with other government agencies and stakeholders, to shorten the time it takes to register a business, from four days, to two hours.

In November 2020, he was elected by the Administrative Council of ARIPO as the organisation's Director General for a four-year term beginning 1 January 2021.

== Other responsibilities ==
In May 2017, Bemanya Twebaze, was appointed receiver-manager of Uganda Telecom Limited, a parastatal company which had failed to meet its financial obligations. Although a forensic audit by PricewaterhouseCoopers determined UTL's liabilities at Sh700 billion (approx. US$196 million), with total assets valued at Sh248 billion (approx. US$69 million), Bemanya Twebaze is optimistic that the business can be revived back to profitability.

In January 2020, the High Court of Uganda replaced Bemanya Twebaze with Ruth Sebatindira, as the Administrator of UTL, in court-appointed receivership. The court ruling was on 2 January 2020 and the hand-over of office occurred on 6 January 2020.

== See also ==
- Kampala Capital City Authority
- Uganda Investment Authority
- Uganda Revenue Authority
