= Mobile technology in Africa =

Mobile Technology in Africa
- Type: Mobile Technology
- Locations: Malawi; Togo; Morocco
- Publication: 2000s

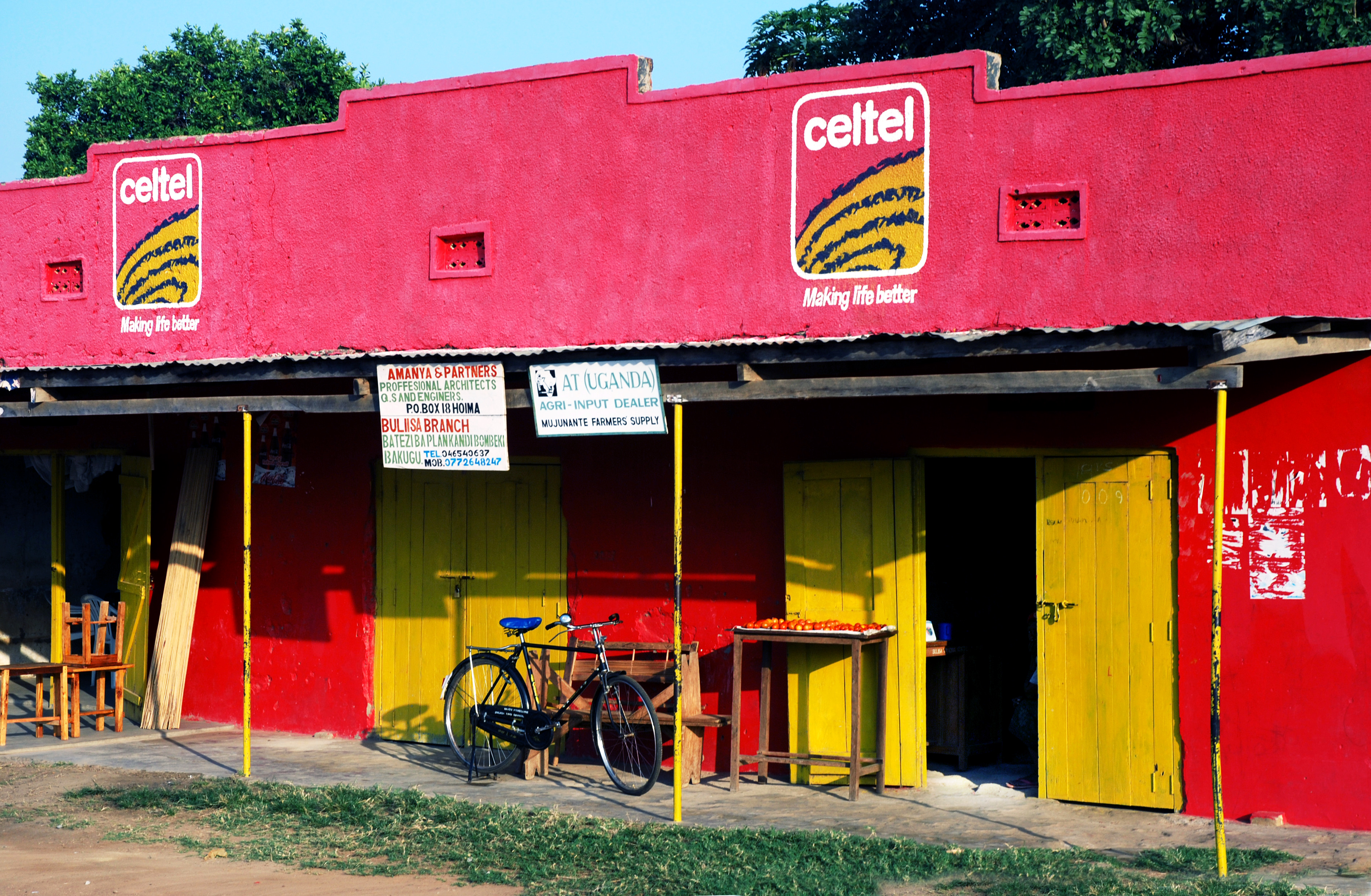
Signs and ads from Celtel and other mobile telephony operators are ubiquitous in rural Africa (picture: Uganda 2009)

Mobile technology in Africa is a fast growing market. Nowhere is the effect more dramatic than in Africa, where mobile technology often represents the first modern infrastructure of any kind. Over 10% of Internet users are in Africa. However, 50% of Africans have mobile phones and their penetration is expanding rapidly. This means that mobile technology is the largest platform in Africa, and can access a wide range of income groups. AppsAfrica reports Mobile App downloads has surpassed 98 billion which is a very huge benefit for mobile app developers in Africa.

As a consequence of the wider availability of mobile telephony with respect to fixed telephony, in many African countries, most Internet traffic goes through the mobile network. An example is Seychelles, that is the African country with a larger percentage of Internet subscribers, where most Internet users access the net through the mobile network.

== Growth of mobile telephony in the 2000s ==
Several factors contributed to the "boom" of mobile telephony in Africa in the 2000s.

=== Limitations of African PSTNs ===
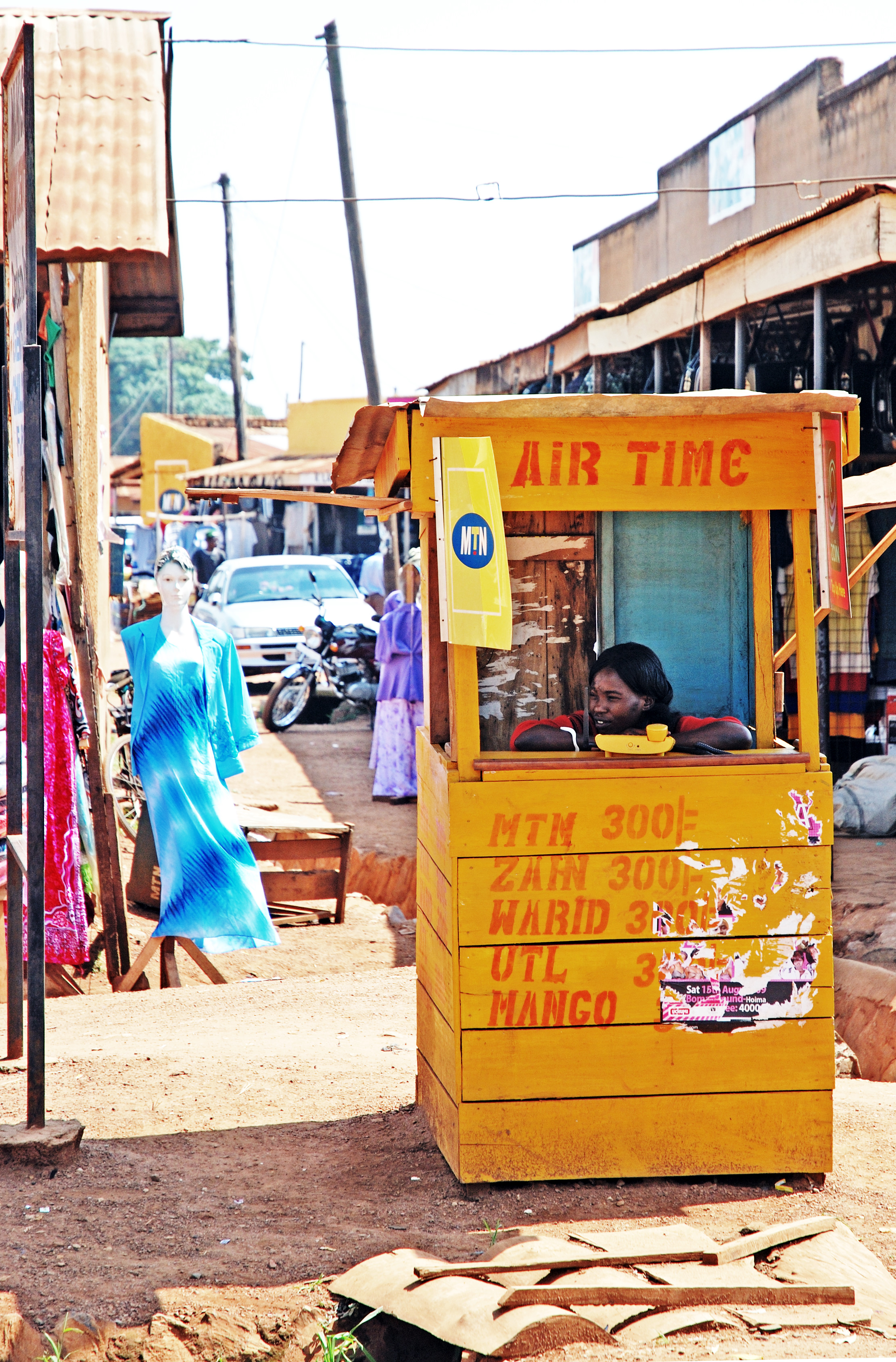
An MTN-operated "mobile phone booth" (Uganda 2009)

A major success factor of mobile telephony in Africa is the scarce diffusion of PSTNs (fixed line networks). In 2000, Sub-Saharan Africa as a whole had fewer telephone lines than Manhattan alone. Fixed line networks hardly reach the remote rural areas where a relevant percentage of the African population lives. Of about 400.000 rural settlements that are estimated to exist in Africa, less than 3% have PSTN access. Mobile telephony providers have taken advantage of this situation, implementing a very aggressive diffusion strategy for mobile networks. In 2006, 45% of rural settlements in Africa had GSM coverage. More recently, coverage has reached 90% of the territory in several countries, including Comoros, Kenya, Malawi, Mauritius, Seychelles, South Africa, and Uganda. Other countries that in 2007 reached above 50% of GSM coverage are Botswana, Burkina Faso, Burundi, Cape Verde, Guinea, Namibia, Rwanda, Senegal, Swaziland, and Togo. As a consequence of the larger diffusion of GSM networks over fixed line networks, "mobile-telephone booths" are common in some areas of Africa.

The fixed line market in Africa is generally based on monopoly (often state monopoly), with a few number of incumbent operators who did not invest in spreading their networks much farther than the larger urban areas. While this situation is changing (for example, both Telkom Kenya and Botswana Telecommunications Corporation have recently been privatized, and a market liberalization strategy has been initiated in several countries), the mobile telephony market is generally more competitive and dynamic.

The table below outlines the percentage of African countries where telecommunications markets (fixed line telephony, mobile telephony, Internet) are fully competitive, partially competitive, or monopolistic, either de iure or de facto (data refer to 2007).

	Internet	Mobile	Fixed line
Monopolistic	10	9	55
Partially competitive	12	41	23
Fully competitive	69	43	25

=== Market strategies ===
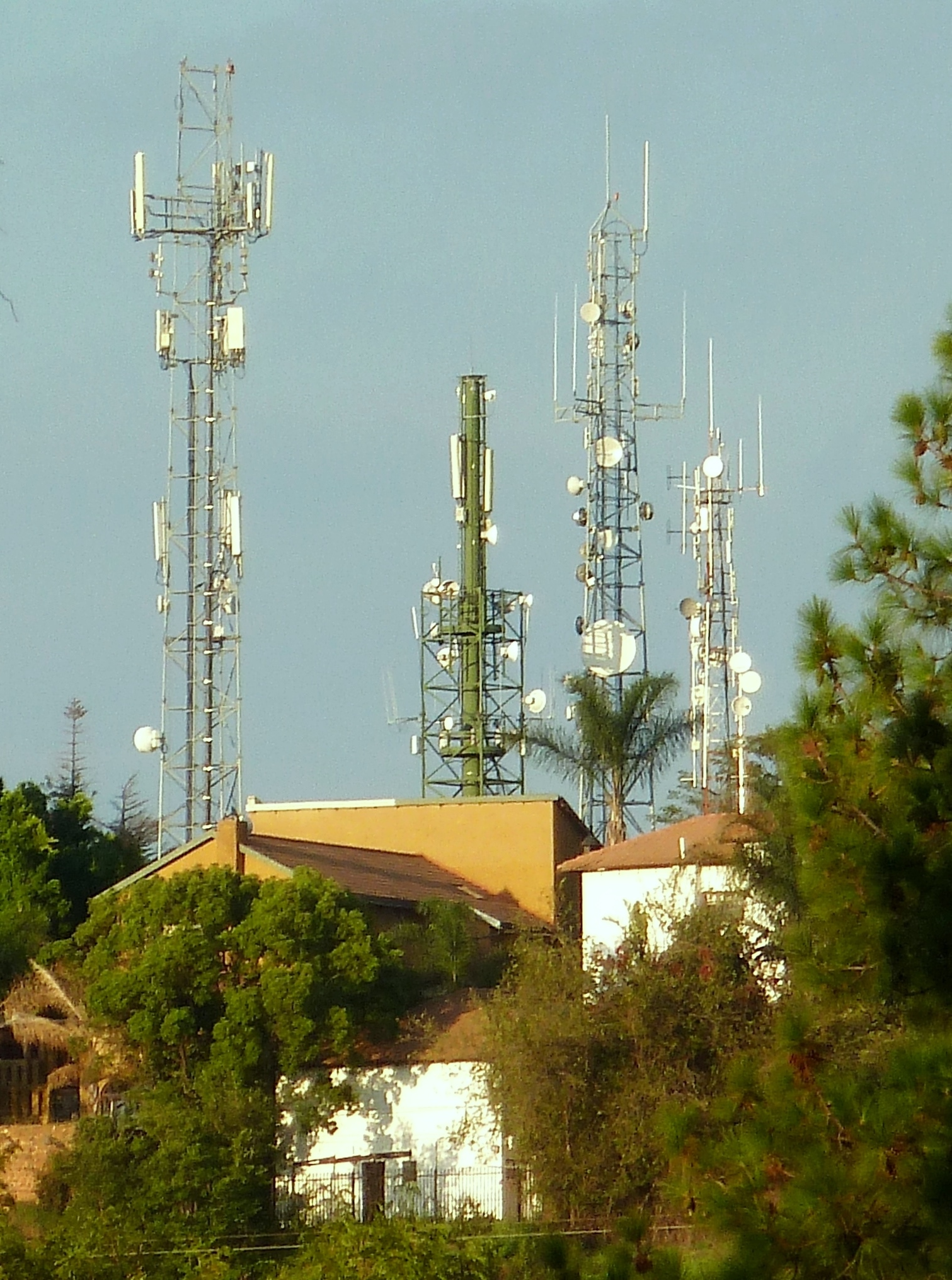
LTE cell towers in Pretoria, South Africa

Mobile telephony providers that introduced mobile telephony in Africa in the 2000s adopted business models explicitly designed to reach the poorest (and largest) section of the population, with low-priced mobile phones and small denomination prepaid cards.

Another key success factor in the providers' strategy in Africa has been the cutting down of roaming costs. This is especially relevant in Africa since strong relationships often hold between neighbouring communities that happen to be separated by national borders. Celtel was the first operator to provide free roaming with the 2006 One Network campaign, whereby roaming became free between Uganda, Kenya, and Tanzania. In 2007 this has been extended to Gabon, DR Congo, Congo-Brazzaville, Burkina Faso, Chad, Malawi, Niger, Nigeria, and Sudan. After Celtel, other providers operating in African markets have announced their intent to gradually reduce and eventually abolish roaming costs for certain areas.

Orange Guinée builds off-grid sites that improve the cell network using masts powered by photovoltaic panels, expanding coverage in rural areas and strengthening coverage in urban areas. This is being financed with a $30 million loan from the European Investment Bank. These solar-powered cell telecommunications antennae will slash grid fuel usage by more than 80%.

== Non-profit mobile technology ==
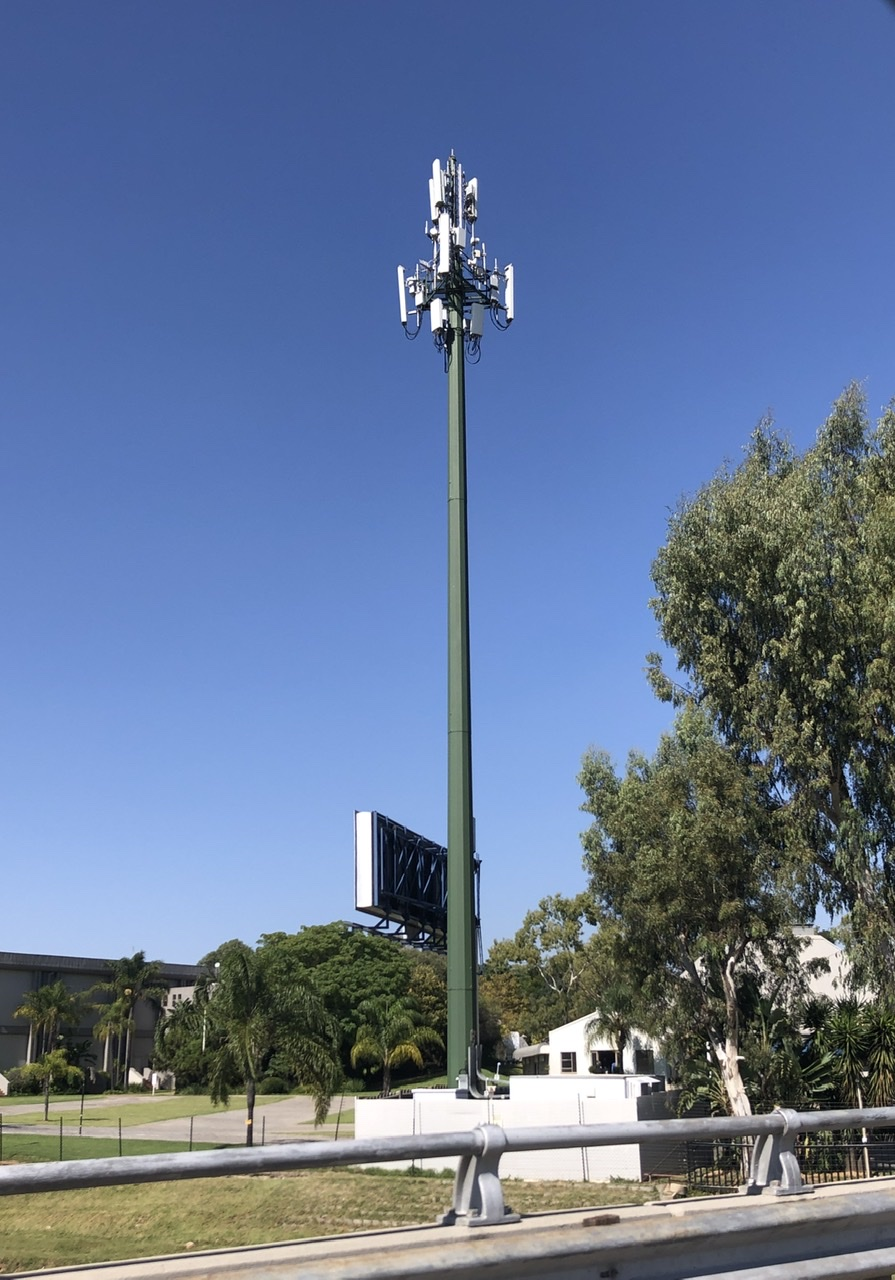
5G Cell Tower in Johannesburg, South Africa

Mobile technology can be used, not only to generate profit from high income groups, but to provide information and create social change for low income groups. For example, mobile technology is used to provide information on health, education, finances or to access specific groups such as the youth. However, people who are very poor have very basic phones. Thus non-profit mobile technology is not aimed at advanced smart phones, but ranges from sending out bulk SMSs to USSD, mobi-sites and mobile communities. AppsAfrica writes the next 1 Billion phone users will come from Rural areas.

The ultimate aim of non-profit mobile technology is to make it free, or as near to free, for the end user. This means enlisting donors and getting mobile networks on board. Internationally, companies such as TextToChange, FrontlineSMS, RapidSMS, Ushahidi all work with mobiles in health, disaster relief and aid management.

== Promote health ==
mHealth is using mobile technology to provide groups with health information. It was pioneered in part by the UN Foundation and Vodafone Foundation through partnerships with the World Health Organization (WHO) and the social enterprise DataDyne, who then joined with other partners in forging the mHealth Alliance. mHealth activities come in the form of appointment reminders, community mobilization and health promotion, emergency toll-free telephone services, health call centres, health surveys, information initiatives and patient monitoring among others.

In June 2011, the first African mobile health summit was held in Cape Town. At the summit, the WHO released a report stating that eighty-three per cent of governments surveyed had at least one mHealth project in their country. However, the majority of mHealth activities were limited in size and scope. mHealth initiatives were health call centres (59%), emergency toll-free telephone services (55%), managing emergencies and disasters (54%), and mobile telemedicine (49%).

In South Africa, companies like Cell-Life and GeoMed and HealthSMS use mobile technology for health.

== Fight HIV/Aids ==
The Praekelt Foundation is a South African example of a non profit organisation that is using mobile technology to create social change. Their programmes have currently reached 50 million people across 15 countries in sub-Saharan Africa.

The founders saw that the technology they were creating for corporate clients could be useful for NGOs to provide information to their target markets. “Full profit want to reach people for different reasons, but people should not be charged for having access to life saving information,” says Marcha Neethling, head of operations at Praekelt Foundation.

One of the mobile technologies developed by Praekelt Foundation is a mobile community called YoungAfricaLive (YAL). Users do not need to have airtime or data bundles on their phones to use it. The aim of the mobile community was to create a space that would be interactive and fun where young people could talk candidly and learn about love, relationships and sex and HIV/AIDS.

The mobile community is unique to the Vodacom network. At the end of 2010, Vodacom’s mobile platform, Vodafone Live, was receiving 3.2 million unique users monthly. As (young) people were already using mobile technology to surf the net and download songs etc. it seemed the perfect place to engage with this target group.

The community is aimed at users between 16 and 24 and users receive daily news and celeb stories. All with a social call to action at the end, they participate in polls, watch videos that link to stories and can engage in anonymous chat rooms. Experts come on to the chat rooms to discuss sexual topics and allow users to ask personal questions anonymously. For example, well known South African sexologist Dr Eve hosts live chats once a week.

Users have engaged with the community and many of the updated features of the community have come directly from user suggestions. Users have commented saying YoungAfricaLive creates a platform for them to express their ideas, making them proud of their status and encouraging them to be responsible around sex.

The ongoing challenge with free mobile communities and technology is continuing to engage the service provider to allow the community to be entirely free. “With YoungAfricaLive South Africa, Vodacom is sponsoring the bandwidth, which is a massive investment... (thus) sustainability is always a question.”

== Community crime fighting ==
In 2011 Vodacom pioneered a project in South Africa to fight crime using mobile phones. They partnered with The Khulisa's Youth out of School Ubuntu Club in Tembisa, Johannesburg and donated a computer and seven mobile phones to the Club. These are used by the young patrollers in the community to keep in touch and to report all crime incidents, as well as update the community on current events.

The project is based in the Phomolong area of Tembisa, which is notorious for high levels of criminal activity. Each mobile phone donated has internet capabilities and the members of the Club will be allocated a mobile phone that they will use to capture events, interview members of the community and create video clips. These will be uploaded to their Facebook page and website all in an effort to report on criminal activity in the community.

The South African Police Service also runs a national crime line which they encourage citizens to SMS in and report crimes in their communities.

== See also ==
- Internet in Africa
- Africa Digital Awards

== Bibliography ==
- Darren Waters (2007), Africa waiting for net revolution. «BBC News» October 29,
- ITU (2007), Telecommunications/ICT Markets and Trends in Africa,
- Reuters (2008), Celtel Expands Free Roaming Network to 12 African Nations,
