= Roke Telkom (Uganda) =

Ugandan telecommunications company

Coordinates: 00°18′59″N 32°34′56″E

- Type: Private
- Industry: Telecommunications
- Founded: 10 January 2006; 20 years ago
- Headquarters: Guardian Georgia Building, Plot 67 Spring Road Bugolobi; Kampala, Uganda
- Key people: Kenneth Kiiza; Founder; Roger Sekaziga; Chief Executive Officer
- Services: Broadband; Internet services
- Website: www.roketelkom.co.ug

Roke telkom is a telecommunications company based in Uganda. It was licensed by Uganda Communications Commission in 2006.

== Location ==
The headquarters and main office of Roke Telkom are located at Guardian Georgia Building, Plot 67 Spring Road, Bugolobi in Nakawa Division, Kampala District. The coordinates of the company headquarters are 0°18'59"N 32°34'56"E (Latitude: 0.31628; Longitude:32.58219).

== History ==
In January 2006, Roke Telkom launched its operations in Uganda. and it was licensed by the Uganda Communications Commission (UCC) as a Public Service Provider (capacity resale, voice and data) and Public Infrastructure Provider in 2006. In 2015, Roke Telkom entered a partnership with Google which enabled the company to increase its fibre footprint.

== Overview ==
Roke Telkom was the first telecommunications company to roll out a fibre connection between Uganda and Tanzania. The company fibre network and fixed wireless network, connecting both multi branch enterprises and residences.
