= Alan Knott-Craig =

South African businessman

Alan Knott-Craig (Sr)
- Born: May 8, 1952 (age 73); Oudtshoorn, South Africa

Alan Knott-Craig (Sr) (born 8 May 1952, Oudtshoorn, South Africa) is a retired South African former CEO of Vodacom (1996 - 2008) and Cell C (2012 - 2014).

== Early life and career ==
Knott-Craig was born on 8 May 1952, Oudtshoorn, South Africa, where he spent his formative years. In 1974 he graduated in a Bachelor of Science degree from the University of Cape Town. His son, Alan Knott-Craig, was born in 1977.

Prior to 1993 he was Senior General Manager of Mobile Communications at Telkom SA, before he moved to Vodacom. In 1996 he was appointed CEO of Vodacom. He held that position until he stepped down in 2008. He also served as an Independent Non-Executive Director of Murray & Roberts Holdings. He was appointed to the Murray & Roberts Board in 2008. He served as chairman of the health, safety and environment committee until 2011. In 2012 he joined Cell C as its CEO until he stepped down in 2014 due to ill health.

== Controversies ==
=== Please Call Me and the Constitutional Court ===
In 2008, former employee Nkosana Makate took Vodacom to court, claiming that the profitable Please Call Me message service was originally his invention and demanding compensation. Eight years later, Makate eventually won his case in the Constitutional Court (the highest court in South Africa). Makate will now enter negotiations with Vodacom for a 15% cut of the R70 billion he claims 'Please Call Me' has earned for Vodacom since its inception.

A 2014 judgement in the South Gauteng High Court supported Makate's claim to having originated Please Call Me. The court heard that, in November 2000, Makate had shared his idea (initially termed the "buzz" idea) with Philip Geissler, then board member and director of product development and management at Vodacom. Geissler had agreed to give Makate a cut should the Please Call Me innovation prove a success. Makate's witnesses presented emails sent by Geissler and an article in Vodacom's "Talk Time" internal newsletter which acknowledged and praised Makate for his idea and his contribution to the product.

The court also rejected former CEO Allan Knott-Craig's lie that he had come up with the idea. Knott-Craig had published the lie in his autobiography, and later lied in court, claiming he had the idea while watching two security guards trying to communicate on phones without airtime. Yet the High Court found against Makate's claim for compensation, holding Vodacom's argument that Geissler had not had the authority to promise Makate such compensation and that the debt would have expired (in legal terms, been prescribed) within three years.

Makate took the case on appeal, and then took it to the Constitutional Court. In April 2016 Justice Chris Jafta found in Makate's favour and against Vodacom, overturning both judgements and finding that Geissler had had the authority to promise compensation, and that Makate's case was not based on an unpaid debt. In his judgement, Justice Chris Jafta had harsh words for Knott-Craig and Geissler. Among other things he said : “In not compensating the applicant [Makate]… Vodacom associated itself with the dishonourable conduct of its former CEO, Mr Knott-Craig and his colleague, Mr Geissler. This leaves a sour taste in the mouth. It is not the kind of conduct to be expected from an ethical corporate entity,”
