= Safaricom Telecommunications Ethiopia =

Ethiopian mobile network operator

Safaricom Telecommunications Ethiopia P.L.C. ሳፋሪኮም ቴሌኮሙኒኬሽን ኢትዮጵያ ፒ.ኤል.ሲ.
- Trade name: Safaricom Telecommunications Ethiopia
- Type: Subsidiary of Safaricom
- Industry: Telecommunications
- Founded: 9 July 2021; 5 years ago
- Headquarters: Addis Ababa, Ethiopia
- Key people: Wim Vanhelleputte, CEO and managing director
- Products: G.S.M related products and mobile money transfer
- Brands: M-Pesa; Masoko (e-commerce); Fuliza; DigiFarm; M-Shwari
- Services: Mobile telephony; Mobile money transfer; Consumer electronics; Ecommerce; Cloud computing; Data; Music streaming; Fibre optic
- Website: Homepage

Safaricom Telecommunications Ethiopia P.L.C. (STE), previously known as Global Partnership for Ethiopia BV (GPE), is a subsidiary of the Kenyan mobile operator Safaricom in Ethiopia, licensed with a fee of US$850 million on 9 July 2021. This fee made it the single largest foreign direct investment into Ethiopia. The firm rolled out telephony services from 2022.

== History ==
Safaricom Telecommunications Ethiopia (STE) was licensed on 9 July 2021 with the aim of liberalizing Ethiopian telecom market. The company sought operating within nine months since its formation but was disrupted by local socio-economic and security factors. STE considered to be a major competitor of Ethio Telecom, who monopolizes the country's telecommunication system in local market and began planning investment $8 billion in the next ten years. In October 2022, the International Finance Corporation (IFC) sought to negotiate with STE with $160 million dollar in its capital expenditure to provide basic quality of the telecom services.

In February 2022, STE completed the assembly of a Tier III, prefabricated data centre, that was manufactured in China. The data centre, which cost US$100 million, will be used to route voice, internet and network communications on the STE network and to store data. The data center is reported to be the size of a "shipping container".

In April 2022, STE agreed in principle with Ethio Telecom for the latter to provide STE access to "cell sites, masts and other active elements such as network roaming".

In November 2024, Wim Vanhelleputte went to the members of the parliamentary committee for Democracy Affairs to ask for the ability for customers to use both Ethio telecom and their network without being charged extra.

== Shareholding ==
As of 25 May 2021, the shareholding of Safaricom Telecommunications Ethiopia was reported to be as follows:

GPE proposed ownership
Rank	Name of owner	Country	Percentage ownership
1	Safaricom	Kenya	55.70%
2	Sumitomo Corporation	Japan	27.20%
3	British International Investment	United Kingdom	10.90%
4	Vodacom	South Africa	6.20%
	Total		100.00%

== See also ==
- Telecommunications in Ethiopia
