= MTN Uganda =

Largest telecom company in Uganda

Coordinates: 00°19′10″N 32°35′53″E

- Type: Public company
- Traded as: USE: MTNU
- Industry: Telecommunications
- Founded: 21 October 1998; 27 years ago
- Headquarters: Plot 69-71 Jinja Road; Kampala, Uganda
- Key people: Charles Mbire; Chairman; Sylvia Mulinge; CEO
- Services: Telecommunications; Information technology; Carrier
- Revenue: Pretax: USh 1.5 trillion (US $407 million) (2019)
- Number of employees: 1,000+ (2021)
- Website: www.mtn.co.ug

MTN Uganda is the largest telecom company in Uganda, with 11.2 million subscribers, accounting for 55 percent market share, as of 30 June 2017. By 31 December 2019, its customer base had increased to 12.6 million customers. In March 2021, the Uganda Communications Commission estimated the number of MTN customers in Uganda at 15 million, out of 28.3 million mobile network subscribers, thereby attaining a 53 percent market share. In May 2024, MTNU registered her 20 millionth customer in the country.

== Location ==
The headquarters of MTN Uganda are located at 69-71 Jinja Road, in the Kampala Central Division, one of the administrative units of the city of Kampala, the capital and largest city of Uganda. The coordinates of the company headquarters are 0°19'10.0"N, 32°35'53.0"E (Latitude:0.319444; Longitude:32.598056).

In 2016, The Independent (Uganda) reported that MTN Uganda, had plans to construct a new skyscraper between Jinja Road and Old Port Bell Road, where British American Tobacco used to maintain offices, which would serve as the headquarters for the company.

== Overview ==
MTN Uganda is a subsidiary of MTN Group, a multinational telecommunications group connecting approximately 232 million people in 22 countries across Africa and the Middle East. In 2009, MTN Uganda introduced its mobile telephone-based banking product known as Mobile Money. As of March 2015, MTN controlled 80 percent of the mobile money market in the country.

In November 2015, MTN Uganda switched off 3.7 million of its 11.5 million customers to comply with the Uganda Communications Commission's new SIM card registration requirements.

In May 2016, MTN Uganda borrowed US$114 million (UGX:385.8 or 380 billion, depending on the source) to expand its network and build a new headquarters building on Jinja Road in Kampala. Funding was in the form of a syndicated loan by a consortium of four Ugandan banks, namely Stanbic Bank Uganda, Standard Chartered Uganda, Citibank Uganda, and Barclays Bank of Uganda (now Absa Bank Uganda Limited).

In August 2016, MTN Uganda in partnership with Commercial Bank of Africa (Uganda) introduced a new product that allows customers to save money and access microloan products, using their cell phone. The product, called MoKash is available on personal accounts and on accounts for small and medium-sized enterprises.

In August 2018, MTN Uganda launched a joint Tidal–MTN music streaming service. The Tidal platform, co-owned by American mogul Jay-Z, offers streaming audio and video for a daily fee of USh1000 (US$0.26). Subscribers receive music, videos and exclusive content. Music from the majority of Uganda's leading artistes is available. At that time, the service was available only in Uganda and South Africa, on the African continent.

As of December 2020, MTN Uganda's customer base totaled 14.1 million subscribers, out of a total of 31 million mobile telephone subscribers in the country, representing a 45.5 percent market share.

== Initial public offering ==
In 2018 The EastAfrican newspaper reported that MTN Uganda planned to list the shares of stock of the company on the Uganda Securities Exchange (USE). That willingness to list, on the part of MTN Uganda, was again reported in March 2019.

In March 2020 MTN Uganda agreed to pay US$100 million for a 14-year operating licence and to list 20 percent shareholding on the USE, no later than the second quarter of 2022. The shares sold on the USE will be restricted to nationals of the countries of the East African Community; namely Burundi, Kenya, Rwanda, South Sudan, Tanzania and Uganda. The IPO was expected to raise about US$1.2 billion, according to Keith Kalyegira, the CEO of the Capital Markets Authority of Uganda (CMA).

On 27 May 2024 the MTN Group made a secondary offering to investors on the USE to take up 7.03 percent shareholding, so as to comply with the regulatory maximum 80 percent ownership in MTN Uganda by the Group.

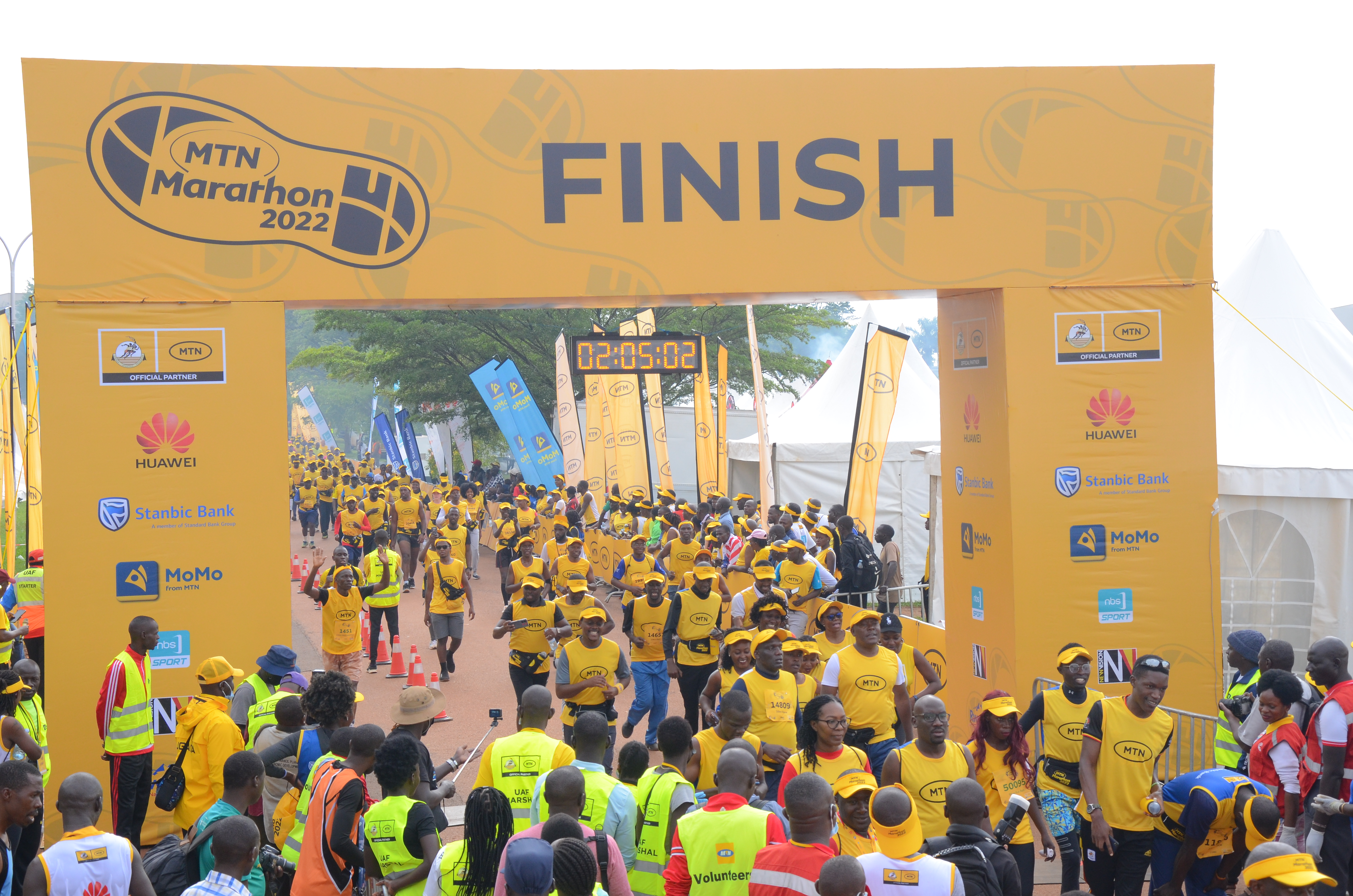
The MTN Kampala Marathon

== Shareholding ==
As of December 2021, the shareholding in MTN Uganda is as listed in the table below. The IPO that was concluded in November 2021, raised USh:535,939,000,000 (approx. US$151 million). The shares of stock of the company started trading on the Uganda Securities Exchange, on 6 December 2021 at 9.30am, local time. It trades under the symbol MTNU.

Shareholding in MTN Uganda Limited
Rank	Name of owner	% ownership post-IPO
1	MTN Group	83.05
2	NSSF Uganda	8.84
3	Charles Magezi Mbire	3.99
4	NSSF Uganda - Sanlam	0.26
5	Bank of Uganda Defined Benefits Scheme – Sanlam	0.19
6	NSSF Kenya - Sanlam	0.18
7	Duet Africa Opportunities Master Fund ICF	
8	FG Hermes Oman LLC	
9	First Rand Bank Limited	
10	Uganda Revenue Authority Staff Benefit Scheme – Sanlam	
11	Approximately 20,000 other investors	3.06
	Total	100.00

=== Shareholding post secondary public offer ===
On 27 May 2024, MTN Group floated the shares that did not sell in the IPO in order to comply with the regulatory requirement not to own more than 80 percent of MTN Uganda. The secondary offer was 130 percent over-subscribed. The table below illustrates the shareholding in the company as of 20 June 2024, when the data was released.

Shareholding in MTN Uganda Limited in June 2024
Rank	Name of owner	% ownership post-2nd float	
1	MTN Group	76.00	
2	NSSF Uganda	11.70	
3	Charles Magezi Mbire	4.00	
4	First Rand Bank Limited	1.60	
5	JPM FRB A/c Africa Partners Fund	0.90	
6	Uganda National Social Security Fund II	0.40	
7	BNYMSNV SBSA IML LAU	0.40	
8	BNYMSNV BHF Asset Management	0.20	
9	Bank of Uganda Defined Benefits Scheme I	0.20	
10	SSB Russell Investment Company Plc Fund	0.20	
11	Approximately 20,600 other tnvestors	3.06	3.50
	Total	100.00	

== Governance ==
As of March 2019, the acting chief executive officer of the company was Gordian Kyomukama, previously the chief technology officer. In June 2019, Wim Vanhelleputte re-assumed his position as CEO, after he returned to Uganda, following negotiations between the Ugandan government and MTN International. As of November 2023, the chairman of the board is Charles Magezi Mbire and the CEO is Sylvia Wairimu Mulinge.

== Controversy ==
Wim Vanhelleputte was the chief executive officer. On 14 February 2019, he was suddenly deported from Uganda to his native Belgium on allegations of compromising Uganda's national security. This followed the deportation of three other MTN Uganda executives in the month of July 2018, including the General Manager-Mobile Financial Services, General Manager-Sales and Distribution, and Chief Marketing Officer. All were accused of "compromising Uganda's national security. The former CEO then sued the government of Uganda in Uganda's High Court.

In May 2019, following negotiations between president Yoweri Museveni and MTN International, Wim Vanhelleputte was allowed to return to Uganda and resume his duties as CEO of MTN Uganda.

== Licensing ==
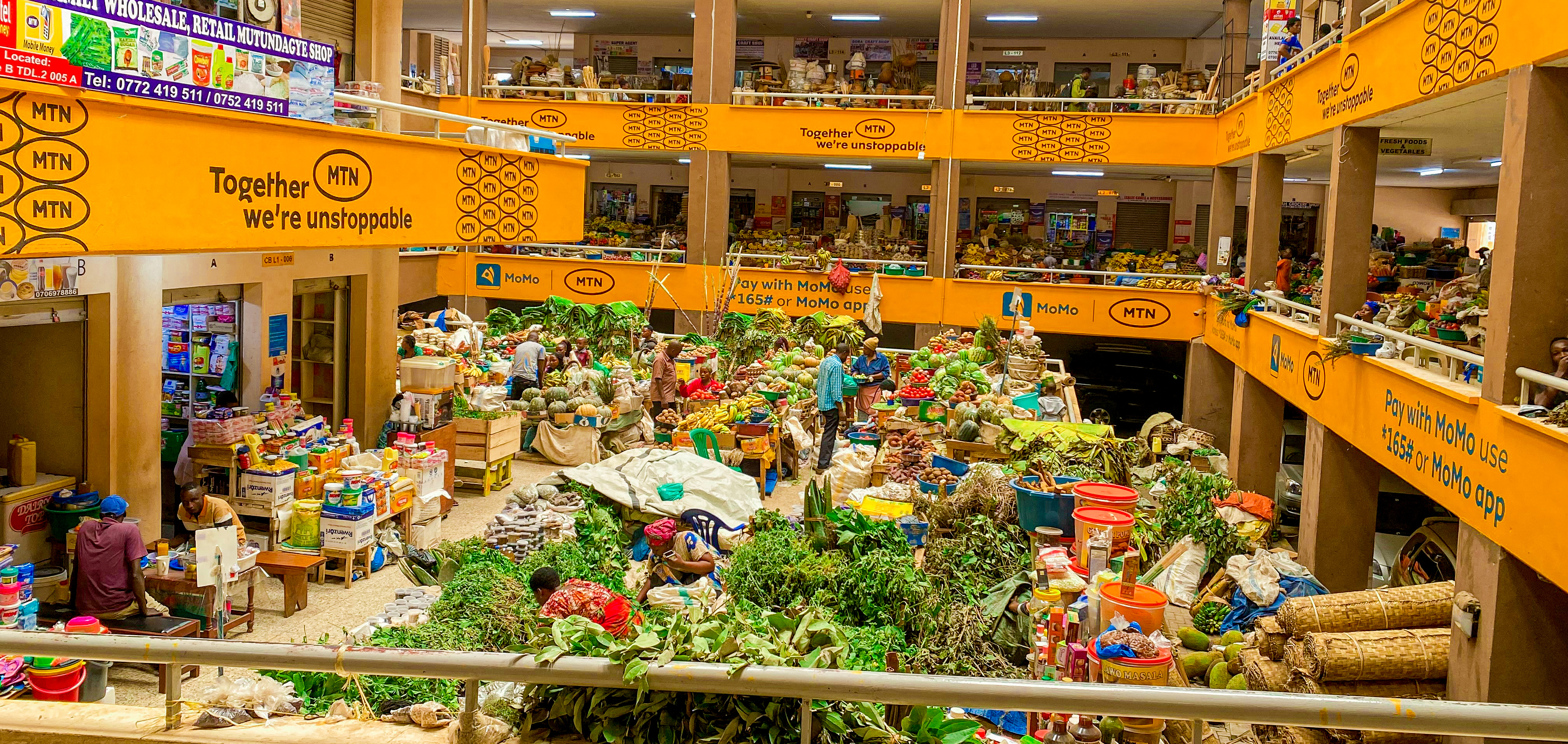
MTN advertising at a market in Mbarara

In October 2018, the company's initial 20-year operating license expired. Due to prolonged negotiations between MTN and the Ugandan government, the company has since been operating on temporary short-term licenses. In March 2020 MTN Uganda agreed to pay US$100 million for a 14-year operating license. The telecom also agreed to list its shares on the USE and float at least 20 percent shareholding, in an IPO.

In July 2020, MTN Uganda received an operators licence for 12 years, starting on 1 July 2020. Under the terms of the new licence, MTN Uganda shall list a portion of their shareholding (minimum of 20 percent), on the Uganda Securities Exchange within 24 months of obtaining the licence. The licence cost US$100 million, which was paid in full in one lump sum.

== Financials ==
In the 12 months ended 31 December 2019, MTN Uganda's gross revenue amounted to USh1.5 trillion (approx. US $407 million).

== Data centres ==
As of December 2021, MTN Uganda maintained six data centres spread across the country, where communication data is collected, distributed, controlled and monitored. Two of the centres are located at Mutundwe and Mbuya, in Kampala, the capital city. The other four data centres are located at Mbarara, Masindi, Lira and Tororo. Through these centres and approximately 2550 communications data masts in the country MTNU provides 72 percent landmass coverage translating into 92 percent population coverage in Uganda. In compliance with its licensing terms, MTNU plans to increase landmass coverage from 72 percent in 2021 to 90 percent in 2023.

== Recent market share ==
In July 2022, The EastAfrican reported that MTN Uganda controlled 47.5 percent of the mobile telephone market in the county, at the end of 2021. At that time its subscriber base was 16.7 million accounts. Competitors include Airtel Uganda, Uganda Telecom and Lycamobile Uganda. As of May 2024, MTN Uganda customer base had increased to 20 million. As of July 2026, the telco customer base had increased to 24.4 million of whom 14.7 million were registered mobile money customers.

== See also ==
- List of mobile network operators in Uganda
