= Airtel Uganda =

Ugandan telecommunications company

Coordinates: 00°19′14″N 32°35′18″E

- Type: Public: USE:AIRTEL UGANDA
- Industry: Telecommunications
- Predecessor: Zain Uganda; Celtel Uganda
- Founded: June 8, 2010; 16 years ago
- Headquarters: Airtel Towers, 16A Clement Hill Road, Kampala, Uganda
- Area served: Uganda
- Key people: Soumendra Sahu (managing director)
- Products: Mobile telephony Broadband; Internet services
- Services: Telecommunications; Information technology; Carrier
- Revenue: ▲US$457 million (2023)
- Net income: ▲US$76.08 million (2023)
- Total assets: ▲US$564 million (2023)
- Total equity: ▲US$32.47 million (2023)
- Parent: Airtel Africa
- Website: www.airtel.co.ug

Airtel Uganda Limited is a mobile communications and information technology services provider in Uganda. The company also offers mobile funds transfer and banking services known as Airtel Payments Bank. Airtel Uganda Limited is a subsidiary of Airtel Africa PLC.

== Location ==
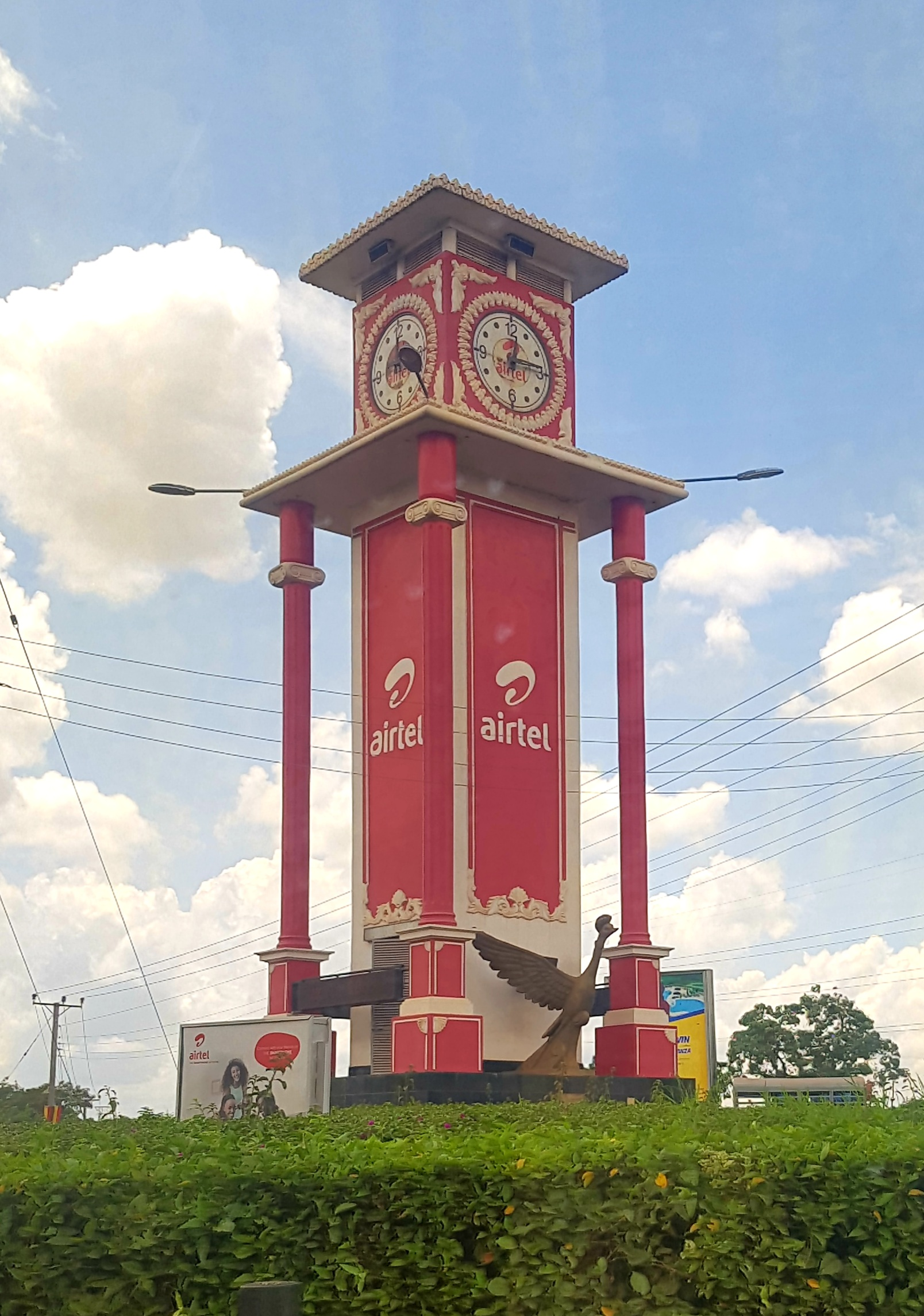
Airtel clock tower in the center of Kibuye roundabout

The headquarters of Airtel Uganda are located in Airtel Towers, along Clement Hill Road, in the Central Division of Kampala, the county's capital and largest city. The coordinates of the headquarters are 0°19'14.0"N, 32°35'18.0"E (Latitude:0.320556; Longitude:32.588333).

== History ==
Airtel entered the Uganda market on June 8, 2010 when Bharti Airtel acquired 16 Zain Africa operations. In 2013, Airtel fully acquired Warid Telecom Uganda in the first ever in-country acquisition in the telecommunications sector. With this, Airtel further consolidated its position as the second largest mobile operator in Uganda with a combined customer base of over 7.4 million and market share of over 39 percent cementing its position as the number 2 mobile telephone network, behind market leader MTN Uganda.

In 2018, Airtel hit the 10 million customer mark. This milestone cemented Airtel’s position as the fastest growing telecom in Uganda. In January 2019, Airtel Uganda achieved 100 percent 4G LTE across all its sites in Uganda, translating the national broadband policy into reality. The telco owns in excess of 2,000 masts in Uganda, as of April 2020.

== Overview ==
Airtel Uganda is one of the leading telecommunication service providers in Uganda, offering communication products and services; 2G, 3G and 4G wireless voice, data services and mobile commerce through Airtel Money. As of March 2021, the Uganda Communications Commission (UCC), estimated the number of subscribers to Airtel Uganda at 10 million out of the 28.3 million mobile network subscribers in the country. This translated into a 35.3 percent market share.

== Airtel Money ==
The Airtel Money platform is a primary contributor to financial inclusion and a key point for financial inclusion with over 5 million customers as at 31 March 2018. Airtel Uganda launched Mobile Commerce in 2012.

== Investment ==
Airtel is a long term investor with a single largest foreign direct investment from India to Uganda. The company is among the leading tax payers in Uganda.

In 2019, Airtel was recognized as Uganda’s biggest taxpayer for compliance in remitting taxes to Uganda Revenue Authority. Airtel Uganda paid taxes worth UGX136 billion (approx. US$38 million), in the financial year 2018/19 winning the Excel Award.

== Infrastructure investment ==
Airtel invests in local ICT and telecom infrastructure; 2,000 sites and over 3,900 kilometers of fiber across Uganda cover 95.9 percent core and transmission networks and mobile financial services platform.

== Governance ==
Soumendra Sahu has been managing director of Airtel Uganda since December 2024.

== Shareholding ==
As of 6 November 2023, the shareholding in the stock of the company was as depicted in the table below:

Shareholding in Airtel Uganda Limited
| Rank | Name of owner | % ownership post-IPO | Ref. |
|---|---|---|---|
| 1 | Bharti Airtel | 88.11 | |
| 2 | NSSF Uganda | 11.55 | |
| 3 | Over 4,000 retail investors | 0.34 | |
| | Total | 100.00 | |

== License renewal ==
In December 2020, print media reported that Airtel Uganda had paid US$74.6 million to the Uganda government in exchange for a 20-year National Telecom Operator's License. The basic license cost US$63.2 million and Value Added Tax (VAT) came to US$11.4 million. As a condition for the license, that is effective on 1 July 2020, the telco has until 1 July 2025 to extend coverage of both voice and data to at least 90 percent of Uganda's geographical territory.

In January 2022, The EastAfrican reported that the license payment made in December 2020 was for the ten years from July 2020 to June 2030. Another estimated US$77.78 million was owed to the Uganda Government for the period from July 2030 until June 2040.

== Listing of shares ==
It is expected that Airtel Uganda would list at least 20 percent of its shares of stock on the Uganda Securities Exchange (USE) in 2022, to comply with Ugandan laws and regulations. In April 2022, the telco requested for a one-year extension to the original listing deadline of December 2022.

In Q3 2023 Airtel Uganda announced its intention to list 8 billion existing shares of the company stock, comprising 20 percent shareholding on the USE, between 29 August and 13 October 2023, to comply with Uganda's licensing laws. Each share is listed at USh:100 (approx. US$0.02717) and the IPO is expected to raise USh:800 billion (approx. US$217.34 million). Airtel selected Absa Bank Uganda as its lead transaction advisor for the process and Crested Stocks and Securities Limited as its lead sponsoring broker. On 7 November 2023, the shares of stock of Airtel Uganda began trading on the USE under the symbol: AIRTEL UGANDA.

== See also ==
- List of mobile network operators in Uganda
