= Celtel =

African-based telecommunications company (1998-2007)

- The Celtel Logo
- Type: Private
- Industry: Telecommunications
- Founded: 1998; 28 years ago
- Defunct: September 8, 2007; 18 years ago
- Fate: Acquired by Zain
- Headquarters: Amsterdam, Netherlands
- Key people: Mo Ibrahim, Chairman
- Products: G.S.M.-related products
- Parent: Zain (2006-2008)

Celtel was a telecommunications company that operated in several African countries. It was founded by Sudanese-born Mo Ibrahim.

== History ==
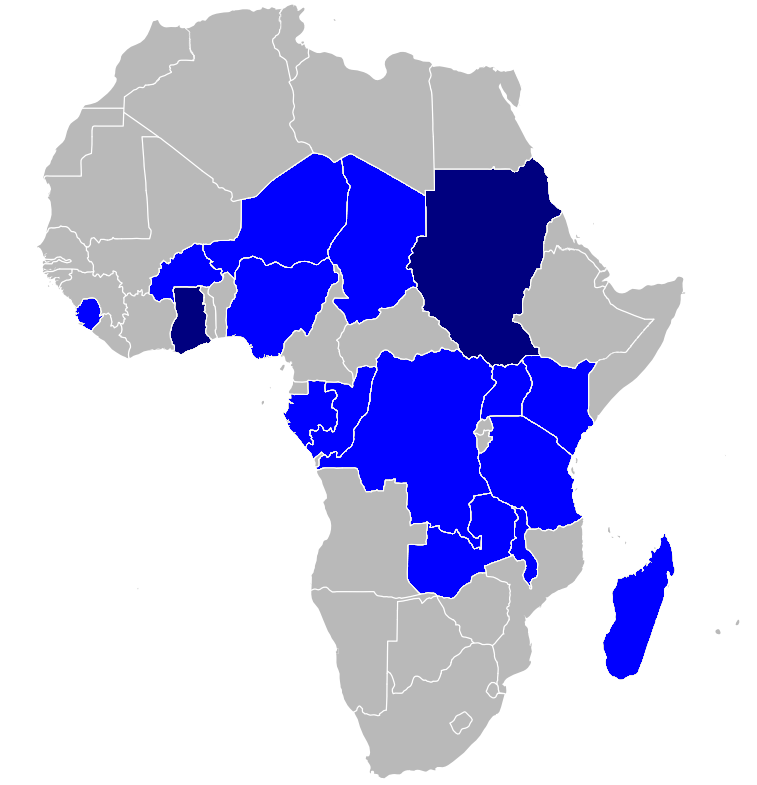
Celtel coverage in Africa. Dark blue countries are where the Celtel brand is not used.

Originally known as "MSI Cellular Investments", the company began operating in 1998. In January 2004, the company name was changed to "Celtel International".

In April 2005 the company was acquired by and became a subsidiary of Zain (formerly the Mobile Telecommunications Company). At the time it was purchased by Zain in April 2005, Celtel had about 24 million subscribers in 14 African countries.

On 8 June 2010 the company was purchased by Bharti Airtel from Zain. On 22 November 2010, it was rebranded as 'Airtel'.

== One Network ==
In September 2006 Celtel launched "One Network", the world's first borderless network across East Africa, this was possible due to the Gateway license for Data which Kenya Data Network had acquired. KDN provided Celtel with a cross border link to Uganda and with trunk capacity to Belgacom. With these links Celtel was no longer required to pass its traffic through the gateway of the monopoly in Kenya. One Network enabled its subscribers in Kenya, Uganda and Tanzania to roam free between these countries, thereby scrapping roaming charges, making calls at local rates, receiving incoming calls free of charge, and recharging with local top up cards.

In June 2007 Celtel's One Network was extended to Gabon, the Democratic Republic of Congo, and Congo. The One Network automatically activated upon crossing the geographical border into one of the six countries with no prior registration or sign-up fee.

In June 2007, Celtel International announced plans to add three more Celtel country networks to its "One Network". The additional countries were Malawi, Sudan (where it operated under the Mobitel brand), and Zambia. This further expansion brought the coverage of One Network to nine of the 15 African countries in which Celtel operated.

In September 2007 Celtel's Parent Company MTC Group adopted a new name Zain (Arabic for ‘beautiful, good and wonderful) unifying its different brands in 22 Countries.

In October 2007 Celtel International Acquired a 75% stake in Western Telesystems LTD (Westel) from the Ghanaian Government for $120 million US Dollars.

On 22 November 2007 Celtel doubled its One Network countries from 6 to 12 countries by adding Burkina Faso, Chad, Malawi, Niger, Nigeria and Sudan.

In April 2008, Zain planned to expand its "One Network" across its 22 operations by end of June 2008.

The One Network is still operated in Africa today by Bharti Airtel in association with Zain and Cell C.

== Acquisition ==
On 29 March 2005, Zain Group, then known as Mobile Telecommunications Company (MTC), announced that it would acquire 85% of Celtel International for US$2.84 billion with the option of acquiring the remaining 15% after two years for US$520 million. This acquisition dampened the thought that the Pan-African mobile communications group would list its stock on the London and Johannesburg Stock Exchanges through an IPO.

1 August 2008 saw the entire African operations of Celtel being rebranded from Celtel to Zain. This marked the end of the Celtel brand.

== See also ==
- Mobile telephony in Africa
- Bharti Airtel
- Airtel Africa
- Zain
