= Vodacom =

South African telecommunications company

Vodacom Group Limited
- Type: Public subsidiary
- Traded as: JSE: VOD
- ISIN: ZAG000106063; US92858D2009
- Industry: Telecommunications
- Founded: 1994; 32 years ago
- Founders: Alan Knott-Craig Sr.
- Headquarters: Midrand, Gauteng, South Africa
- Area served: Africa
- Key people: Shameel Joosub (CEO); Till Streichert (CFO); Dejan Kastelic (CTO); Phillip Moleketi (chairman)
- Products: Mobile telephony Internet services
- Revenue: ▲R98.302 billion (US$6.65 billion, 2021); R90.746 billion (US$6.14 billion, 2020)
- Operating income: ▲R22.093 billion (US$1.49 billion, 2018); R19.228 billion (US$1.3 billion, 2017)
- Net income: ▲R24.252 billion (US$1.64 billion, 2018); R21.750 billion (US$1.47 billion, 2017)
- Total assets: ▲R96.543 billion (US$6.53 billion, 2018); R52.127 billion (US$3.53 billion, 2017)
- Total equity: ▲R131.365 billion (US$8.89 billion, 2018); R81.138 billion (US$5.49 billion, 2017)
- Number of employees: 7,554 (2018)
- Parent: Vodafone Group plc (65.1%)
- Website: vodacom.com

Vodacom Group Limited is a South African mobile communications company, providing voice, messaging, data and converged services to over 130 million customers across Africa.

From its roots in South Africa, Vodacom has grown its operations to include networks in Egypt, Tanzania, the Democratic Republic of the Congo, Mozambique, and Lesotho, and provides business services to customers in over 32 African countries, including Nigeria, Zambia, Angola, Kenya, Ghana, Côte d'Ivoire, and Cameroon.

== History ==
It was owned in a 50/50 partnership by the South African telecommunications giant Telkom and British multinational operator Vodafone. On 6 November 2008, Vodafone announced that it had agreed to increase its stake to 64.5%, and Telkom said that it would spin off its remaining holding by listing it on the Johannesburg Stock Exchange (JSE). On 1 April 2011, Vodacom officially unveiled its new change in branding from blue to red, using the same style as its parent company, Vodafone.

Vodacom provides coverage to Mount Kilimanjaro, which was the highest point in the world to be covered by GSM, until Axiata (through its subsidiary Ncell) provided coverage at the top of Mount Everest, the highest point in the world. Vodacom was aided by its optimistic advertisements at the early stages of the democratic South Africa, including the yebo gogo campaign which is still in effect today in Africa. Vodacom is the leading cellular network in South Africa with a market share of over 40% and more than 45 million users. The company has an estimated market share of 58% and more than 103 million customers across Africa.

In 2021, Vodacom proposed a merger with fibre group Maziv. In October 2024, the South African Competition Tribunal blocked the proposed merger. In November 2024, Vodacom said it would not look into other M&A deals.

In August 2025, Vodacom announced that it had made South Africa's first native call over 5G. The call used Vodacom’s Single Packet Core, and was made using Vodacom's test network - a step towards the company officially rolling out native 5G call services in SA.

In the same month, Vodacom's proposed acquisition of a 30% to 34.95% shareholding in fiber network operator Maziv, the parent company of Vumatel and Dark Fibre Africa (DFA), was approved by the South African Competition Appeals Court.

The Court set aside the order of the Tribunal that prohibited the merger. However, on top of existing terms that were proposed, to limit anti-competitiveness in the South African fiber market, additional concessions were agreed upon to limit Vodacom’s influence over Maziv, and expand the former's capital expenditure commitments.

In December 2025, Vodacom announced its intention to increase its shareholding in Kenyan telecoms company Safaricom by 20%, taking its total ownership to a controlling shareholding of 54.9%. The deal also includes an upfront payment of R5.3 billion to secure the right to future Safaricom dividends that would otherwise go to the Kenyan government. At the time of the announcement, Safaricom held a 60% mobile market share in Kenya, and was valued at around R148 billion.

== Technology ==
Vodacom South Africa provides 3G, 4G, and UMTS networks in South Africa, and also offers HSPA+ (21.1 Mbit/s), HSUPA (42 Mbit/s, 2100 MHz), Wi-Fi, WiMAX, and LTE services. Vodacom was the first cellular provider to introduce LTE in South Africa. On 21 October 2015, Vodacom launched its fibre product to the home user. On 7 April 2017, Vodacom's 4G+ network in Brooklyn Mall, Pretoria achieved 240 Mbit/s in a speed test. In early 2020 Vodacom also became the second network operator in Africa to launch a live 5G network, initially available in Johannesburg, Pretoria and Cape Town.

In February 2022, Vodacom Group partnered with Amdocs, an Israeli-founded multinational telecommunications software company, to enhance its customer experience and billing systems with a cloud-native platform. As part of its modernization strategy, Vodacom implemented cloud-native charging solutions to unify its IT architecture across regional operations. The partnership also established an African Center of Excellence aimed at improving operational efficiencies and accelerating the deployment of 5G services across Vodacom's subsidiaries, including its networks in Tanzania, Mozambique, and the Democratic Republic of the Congo (DRC).

== Member companies ==
As at March 2023, the companies that comprised the Vodacom Group include, but are not limited to, the following:

Vodacom Group member companies
Name of member company	Vodacom Group's ownership (%)	Country	No. of employees	No. of customers	Ref
Vodacom (Pty) Ltd	100	South Africa	5,007	44,200,000	
VM, SA	85	Mozambique	530	10,700,000	
Vodacom Lesotho (Pty) Ltd	80	Lesotho	209	1,700,000	
Vodacom Tanzania Ltd	75	Tanzania	537	16,700,000	
Vodafone Egypt Telecommunications S.A.E.	55	Egypt	Unavailable	45,500,000	
Safaricom	55	Kenya	6,477	43,900,000	
Vodacom Congo (RDC) s.p.r.l.	51	DRC	578	21,000,000	
Safaricom Telecommunications Ethiopia	36.8^{1}	Ethiopia	Unavailable	2,100,000	

^{1 - Effective shareholding. 55.70% held through Safaricom and 6.20% held directly.}

== Ownership ==
The shares of Vodacom Group are listed and traded on the JSE, under the ticker symbol: VOD. The shareholding in the group's stock was as depicted in the table below in May 2022.

Vodacom Group stock ownership
Name of owner	Shareholding (%)
Vodafone Investments SA (Pty) Ltd	65.1
Government Employees Pension Fund (GEPF), wholly owned by South African Government	13.54
YeboYethu Investment Company (Pty) Ltd	6.23
Wheatfield Investments 276 (Pty) Ltd	0.84
Institutional investors	15.76
Retail positions	2.96
Others	0.17
Total	100.00

Institutional investors include, in order of held stock, the Public Investment Corporation (also known as PIC, wholly owned by the South African Government), Lazard (US), Blackrock (US), The Vanguard Group (US), Government of Singapore Investment Corporation (also known as GIC, Singapore), Old Mutual (ZA), Abax (ZA), Sanlam (ZA), and State Street Global Advisors (US).

== Sports sponsorships ==
Vodacom is a sponsor of many South African sports.

In provincial rugby union, they are the sponsors of the Pretoria-based Vodacom Blue Bulls and own the naming rights to the union's home stadium, Loftus Versfeld.

As part of their rugby union sponsorship portfolio, Vodacom has been the title sponsor of the Super Rugby tournament in South Africa since 1996.

In football, they sponsor two clubs in the Premier Soccer League: the Kaizer Chiefs and Orlando Pirates. They also sponsor the South African Football Association and the national teams Bafana Bafana (men), Amajita (under 20s), and previously Banyana Banyana (women). However, competitor MTN was one of the sponsors of the 2010 FIFA World Cup held in South Africa.

Past sponsorships include the national rugby union team, the Springboks, from 1994 to 2017, and the South African Shelby Can-Am series between 2000 and 2005.

== Controversies ==
=== JSE listing ===
On May 17, 2009, a court dismissed a joint Congress of South African Trade Unions (COSATU) and ICASA application to stop Vodacom's JSE listing. Chegoane Mabelane, a South African article writer and prominent supporter of both African National Congress (ANC) and its alliances; in one of his articles stated that the interdict to stop the listing was fair.

In January 2010, the Sunday Times alleged that Alan Knott-Craig (Senior), former Vodacom CEO, helped his son, Alan Knott-Craig with business ventures using Vodacom's resources. He also allegedly awarded a multimillion-rand contract to a marketing and advertising company run by his family members.

=== "Please Call Me" ===
In 2008, former employee Nkosana Makate took Vodacom to court, claiming that the profitable "Please Call Me" message service was originally his invention and demanding compensation. Eight years later, Makate eventually won his case in the Constitutional Court. Makate then entered negotiations with Vodacom for a 15% cut of the R70 billion ($4.74 billion) he claims "Please Call Me" has earned for Vodacom since its inception.

A 2014 judgement in the South Gauteng High Court supported Makate's claim to having originated "Please Call Me." The court heard that, in November 2000, Makate had shared his idea (initially termed the "buzz" idea) with Philip Geissler, then board member and director of product development and management at Vodacom. Geissler had agreed to give Makate a cut should the "Please Call Me" innovation prove a success (however, there was no such agreement, written, oral, or implied – and no evidence to support it). Makate's witnesses presented emails sent by Geissler (Geissler was never called to testify by either party, raising suspicion that both parties would not have benefited from what Geissler would say under oath) and an article in Vodacom's "Talk Time" internal newsletter (such newsletter was written, edited, and printed by a third party in Cape Town) which acknowledged and praised Makate for his idea and his contribution to the product.

The court also rejected former CEO Alan Knott-Craig's claim that he had come up with the idea. Knott-Craig had published the claim in his autobiography, and later repeated in court, that he had the idea while watching two security guards trying to communicate on phones without airtime. Yet the High Court found against Makate's claim for compensation, holding Vodacom's argument that Geissler had not had the authority to promise Makate such compensation and that the debt would have expired (in legal terms, been prescribed) within three years.

Makate took the case on appeal, and then took it to the Constitutional Court. In April 2016, Justice Chris Jafta found in Makate's favour and against Vodacom, overturning both judgements by the High Court, finding that Geissler had the authority to promise compensation, and that Makate's case was not based on an unpaid debt. In Jafta's words: “In not compensating the applicant [Makate] [….] Vodacom associated itself with the dishonourable conduct of its former CEO, Mr Knott-Craig and his colleague, Mr Geissler, and this leaves a sour taste in the mouth. It is not the kind of conduct to be expected from an ethical corporate entity.”

In an open letter to Makate on Facebook, civic society non-profit Right2Know congratulated Makate. Right2Know used the letter to draw attention to the hypocrisy of multinational corporations which claim to support young black South African innovators such as Makate, but whose anti-competitive practices often strangle meaningful innovation. The letter also drew attention to the fact that South Africa's telecommunications duopoly (Vodacom–MTN) had led to the kind of unaffordable tariffs which made the "Please Call Me" service so successful with impoverished consumers in the first place.

=== Neotel attempted takeover ===
In October 2013, Vodacom announced it would be acquiring Neotel in a potential US$590 million deal. Even though regulatory approval by the Independent Communications Authority of South Africa (ICASA) was obtained in 2015, the deal ultimately collapsed in March 2016 after competitors successfully challenged the transfer of Neotel's licenses and spectrum to Vodacom in court.

== Smartphone launches ==
Vodacom launched iPhone 7 in South Africa on 14 October 2016. It launched the iPhone Xs and Xs Max on 28 September 2018 starting at R21,999 ($1,650) on a 24 month contract.

The Samsung Galaxy S8 was officially launched on 5 May 2017.

In 2017, TechCrunch reported that Vodacom partnered with GameMine in a $20 million deal to install subscription-based mobile games on Vodacom's smartphones.

== See also ==
- Telephone numbers in Africa
- Telephone numbers in South Africa
- MTN (South Africa)
- Cell C
- Telkom Mobile
