= Airtel Africa =

Telecommunications company in Africa

Airtel Africa plc
- Trade name: Airtel
- Formerly: Airtel Africa Limited (2018–2019)
- Type: Public
- Traded as: LSE: AAF; NGX: AIRTELAFRI; FTSE 100 Constituent
- Industry: Telecommunications
- Predecessor: Zain Africa B.V.
- Founded: 8 June 2010; 16 years ago
- Headquarters: London, England
- Area served: Africa
- Key people: Sunil Bharti Mittal (chairman); Sunil Taldar (CEO)
- Products: Mobile telephony; Mobile phone; Broadband; Internet services
- Services: Africa's leading provider of prepaid, postpaid mobile, & 4G services
- Revenue: ▲$6.415 billion (2026)
- Operating income: ▲$2.115 billion (2026)
- Net income: ▲$0.813 billion (2026)
- Total assets: ▲$13.963 billion (2026)
- Total equity: ▲$3.488 billion (2026)
- Parent: Bharti Airtel (67.2%)
- Subsidiaries: Airtel Chad; Airtel Congo; Airtel DRC; Airtel Gabon; Airtel Kenya; Airtel Madagascar; Airtel Malawi; Airtel Niger; Airtel Nigeria; Airtel Rwanda; Airtel Seychelles; Airtel Tanzania; Airtel Uganda; Airtel Zambia
- Website: airtel.africa

Airtel Africa plc is a British company that provides telecommunications and mobile money services in 14 countries in Africa, mainly in East, Central and West Africa. Airtel Africa is majority owned by the Indian telecommunications company Bharti Airtel. Airtel Africa offers mobile voice and data services as well as mobile money services both nationally and internationally. Airtel Nigeria is the most profitable unit of Airtel Africa, due to its cheap data plans in Nigeria. As of March 2019, Airtel had over 99 million subscribers in the continent. It is listed on the London Stock Exchange and is a constituent of the FTSE 100 Index.

== History ==
=== MTN Group merger negotiations ===
In May 2008, it emerged that Airtel was exploring the possibility of buying the MTN Group, a South Africa-based telecommunications company with operations in 21 countries in Africa and the Middle East. The Financial Times reported that Bharti was considering offering US$45 billion for a 100% stake in MTN, which would be the largest overseas acquisition ever by an Indian firm. However, both sides emphasised the tentative nature of the talks. The Economist magazine noted, "If anything, Bharti would be marrying up", as MTN had more subscribers, higher revenues and broader geographic coverage. However, the talks fell apart as MTN Group tried to reverse the negotiations by making Bharti almost a subsidiary of the new company.

In May 2009, Airtel confirmed that it was again in talks with MTN and both companies agreed to discuss the potential transaction exclusively by 31 July 2009. Airtel said, "Bharti Airtel Ltd is pleased to announce that it has renewed its effort for a significant partnership with MTN Group". The exclusivity period was extended twice up to 30 September 2009. Talks eventually ended without agreement.

A solution was proposed where the new company would be listed on two stock exchanges, one in South Africa and one in India. However, dual listing of companies is not permitted by Indian law.

=== Zain Africa acquisition ===
In Jun 2010, Bharti struck a deal to buy Zain's mobile operations in 15 African countries for $8.97 billion, in India's second-biggest overseas acquisition after Tata Steel's US$13 billion buy of Corus in 2007. Bharti Airtel completed the acquisition of on 8 June 2010, making Airtel the world's fifth-largest wireless carrier by subscriber base. Airtel reported that its revenues for the fourth quarter of 2010 grew by 53% to $3.2 billion compared to the previous year. The newly acquired Africa division contributed $911 million to the total. However, net profits dropped by 41% from $470 million in 2009 to $291 million 2010 due to a $188 million increase in radio spectrum charges in India and an increase of $106 million in debt interest.

=== Rebranding ===
Airtel Tanzania HQ

On 18 November 2010, Airtel rebranded itself in India in the first phase of a global rebranding strategy. The company unveiled a new logo with 'airtel' written in lower case. Designed by London-based brand agency, The Brand Union, the new logo is the letter 'a' in lowercase, with 'airtel' written in lowercase under the logo.

=== Warid Uganda acquisition ===
Airtel acquired the Uganda business of Warid in 2013.

=== Telecom Seychelles acquisition ===
On 11 August 2010, Bharti Airtel announced that it would acquire 100% stake in Telecom Seychelles for US$62 million taking its global presence to 19 countries. Telecom Seychelles began operations in 1998 and operates 3G, Fixed Line, ship to shore services satellite telephony, among value added services like VSAT and Gateways for International Traffic across the Seychelles under the Airtel brand. The company has over 57% share of the mobile market of Seychelles. Airtel announced plans to invest US$10 million in its fixed and mobile telecoms network in the Seychelles over three years, whilst also participating in the Seychelles East Africa submarine cable (SEAS) project. The US$34 million SEAS project is aimed at improving the Seychelles' global connectivity by building a 2,000 km undersea high-speed link to Dar es Salaam in Tanzania.

=== Tigo Rwanda acquisition ===
Bharti Airtel was awarded a licence to operate mobile services by the Rwanda Utilities Regulatory Agency in September 2011. Airtel Rwanda Limited launched services on 30 March 2012. Airtel announced that it had reached an agreement with competitor Millicom to acquire complete control of Tigo Rwanda at a reported cost of $60–70 million in December 2017. The acquisition made Airtel the second largest mobile operator in Rwanda with a 40% market share. The company operated as Airtel-Tigo following the merger, until it was rebranded as Airtel Rwanda in January 2020.

=== IPO ===
Bharti Airtel announced on 4 June 2019 that it would seek to raise $750 million through an initial public offering for Airtel Africa under which the company would be listed on the London Stock Exchange.

== Countries of operations ==
Airtel Africa operates in the following countries:

Country	Subsidiary	Remarks
Chad	Airtel Tchad S.A.	Airtel Chad is the #1 operator with 43% market share.
Democratic Republic of the Congo	Airtel Congo RDC S.A.	Airtel had 1 million customers in 2014.
Gabon	Airtel Gabon S.A.	Airtel Gabon has 829,000 customers and its market share stood at 61%.
Kenya	Airtel Kenya Ltd.	Airtel Kenya is the second largest operator and has about 9 million customers.
Madagascar	Airtel Madagascar S.A.	Airtel holds second place in the mobile telecom market in Madagascar, has a 39% market share and over 1.4 million customers.
Malawi	Airtel Malawi Plc	Airtel Malawi is the market leader with a market share of 72%.
Niger	Celtel Niger S.A.	Airtel Niger is the market leader with a 68% market share.
Nigeria	Airtel Networks Limited	Airtel is the 3rd largest operator with 33,376,556 subscribers, behind Globacom (37,268,483) and MTN Nigeria (61,280,293) as of Nov 2016.
Republic of the Congo	Airtel Congo B	Airtel Congo is the market leader with a 55% market share.
Rwanda	Airtel Rwanda	Airtel launched services in Rwanda on 30 March 2012.
Seychelles	Airtel Seychelles	Airtel has over 55% market share of mobile market in Seychelles.
Tanzania	Airtel Tanzania Limited	Airtel Tanzania is the market leader with a 30% market share.
Uganda	Airtel Uganda Limited	Airtel Uganda stands as the #2 operator with a market share of 38%.
Zambia	Airtel Zambia PLC	Airtel Zambia has a 40.5% market share.

=== Former operations ===
==== Burkina Faso and Sierra Leone ====
Airtel began operating in Burkina Faso and Sierra Leone after acquiring Zain's Africa operations in June 2010. Airtel and French telecom company Orange S.A. signed an agreement in July 2015 for the sale of the former's operations in Burkina Faso, Sierra Leone, Chad and Congo-Brazzaville to the latter. In January 2016, Airtel announced that it had entered an agreement to sell its operations in Burkina Faso and Sierra Leone to Orange. The value of the deal was not disclosed, but analysts estimated it to be US$800–900 million. The agreement on the sale of operation in Chad and Congo-Brazzaville lapsed. Orange assumed control of operations in Burkina Faso in June 2016 and Sierra Leone in July 2016.

==== Ghana ====
Airtel began operating in Ghana after acquiring Zain's Africa operations in June 2010. On 4 March 2017, Airtel and Millicom International Cellular (operating under the Tigo brand) agreed to merge their operations in Ghana (Airtel Ghana Ltd and Tigo Ghana Ltd) to create the country's second largest mobile operator, with the two companies holding an equal stake in the merged entity. On 27 October 2020, Airtel announced that it planned to exit its business in Ghana, and that it had entered into "advanced stages of discussions" for sale of shares in AirtelTigo to the Government of Ghana. AirtelTigo Ghana was sold in October 2020 to the Ghanaian government for $25 million.

== One Network ==
Map showing Airtel coverage globally

One Network is a mobile phone network that allows Airtel customers to use the service in a number of countries at the same price as their home network. Customers can place outgoing calls at the same rate as their local network, and incoming calls are free. As of 2021, the service is available in Bangladesh, Burkina Faso, Chad, Democratic Republic of Congo, Congo Brazzaville, Gabon, India, Kenya, Madagascar, Niger, Nigeria, Rwanda, Seychelles, Sierra Leone, Sri Lanka, Tanzania, Uganda, and Zambia.

== Airtel Money and partial sale ==
Airtel Africa operates a mobile payments and fintech business, Airtel Money, with outside investment. In March 2021, Airtel Africa sold an undisclosed minority fraction of Airtel Money to San Francisco-based private equity firm TPG Capital, at a contract price of US$200 million through TPG's subsidiary The Arise Fund. Shortly after, in early April 2021, Airtel Africa sold an additional undisclosed minority stake of Airtel Money to Mastercard for US$100 million.

In 2026 Airtel Africa announced that it would spin off Airtel Money as a separate company by flotation on the London Stock Exchange. The flotation completed in October 2026. Airtel Money has a legal headquarters in Amsterdam and offices in Dubai.

== See also ==
- airtel India
- airtel Sri Lanka
- airtel Bangladesh
