= List of newspapers in South Africa =

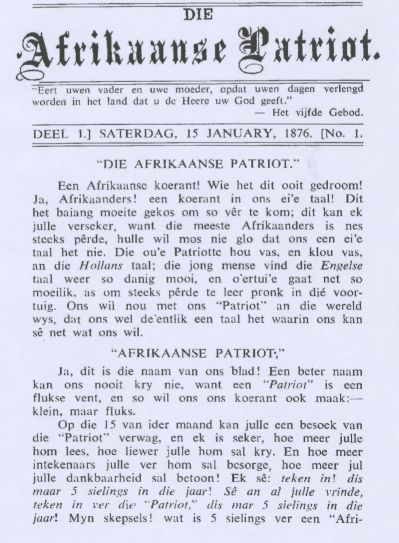
Frontpage of "Die Afrikaanse Patriot" (1876), a newspaper in an early form of the Afrikaans language

This is a list of newspapers in South Africa.

In 2017, there were 22 daily and 25 weekly major urban newspapers in South Africa, mostly published in English or Afrikaans. According to a survey of the South African Audience Research Foundation, about 50% of the South African adult population are newspaper readers and 48% are magazine readers. Print media accounts for about 19.3% of the R34.4bn of advertising money spent in the country.

== Newspapers by circulation ==
Newspaper	Publisher	Language	Circulation (Q2 2013)
Sunday Times	Arena Holdings	English	368,974
Daily Sun	Media24	English	287,222
Rapport	Media24	Afrikaans	192,293
Sunday Sun	Media24	English	170,843
Sunday World	Fundudzi Media	English	123,515
City Press	Media24	English	119,959
Isolezwe	INMSA	Zulu	110,753
Ilanga	Independent	Zulu	107,102
The Sowetan	Arena Holdings	English	95,068
Die Son (daily)	Media24	Afrikaans	91,735
Isolezwe ngeSonto	INMSA	Zulu	91,359
The Star	INMSA	English	80,303
Isolezwe ngoMgqibelo	INMSA	Zulu	79,874
Die Burger (Saturday)	Media24	Afrikaans	72,788
Sunday Tribune	INMSA	English	70,312
The Saturday Star	INMSA	English	63,844
Beeld (daily)	Media24	Afrikaans	63,016
Beeld (Saturday)	Media24	Afrikaans	59,317
Ilanga Langesonto	Independent	Zulu	59,152
Die Burger (daily)	Media24	Afrikaans	57,696
Weekend Argus	INMSA	English	55,731
Son op Sondag	Media24	Afrikaans	54,367
The Times	Arena Holdings	English	50,236
The Citizen (daily)	Caxton	English	49,731
Independent on Saturday	INMSA	English	41,645
Mail & Guardian	Independent	English	41,116
Johannesburg Times	Canvas Media	English	37 911
Sondag	Media24	Afrikaans	32,867
Cape Times	INMSA	English	32,428
Sunday Independent	INMSA	English	30,842
Cape Argus	INMSA	English	30,310
Daily News	INMSA	English	29,385
The Mercury	INMSA	English	28,396
The Citizen (Saturday)	Caxton	English	28,145
Business Day	Arena Holdings	English	26,300
Daily Dispatch	Arena Holdings	English	25,748
The Herald	Arena Holdings	English	20,962
Weekend Post	Arena Holdings	English	20,778
Saturday Dispatch	Arena Holdings	English	20,117
Volksblad (daily)	Media24	Afrikaans	19,949
Weekend Witness	Media24	English	19,035
Volksblad (Saturday)	Media24	Afrikaans	17,988
The Witness	Media24	English	17,151
Laudium Sun	Nismedia	English	16,000
Pretoria News	INMSA	English	14,393
Pretoria News (Saturday)	INMSA	English	8,814

== National publications ==
- Beeld (in 5 of 9 provinces)
- Business Day
- City Press
- Daily Maverick
- Daily Sun
- KwelaXpress
- Mail & Guardian
- Naweek Beeld
- Rapport
- Soccer Laduma
- Sondag (in 6 of 9 provinces)
- The Sowetan
- Sunday Independent
- Sunday Sun
- Forever Yena Newspaper
- Sunday Times
- Sunday World
- The Teacher
- Townpress
- Mzansi Magazine
- Vuk'uzenzele
- The Zimbabwean
- The Life News (South African Digital Newspaper)

== Publications by province ==
=== Mpumalanga ===
- Bulletin
- DAILY SUN
- Ermelo Insight/Ermelo Insig
- Excelsior News
- Highvelder
- Kasi Express Community Newspaper
- News Everyday
- Ridge Times
- Standerton Advertiser
- Witbank News
- Ziwaphi
- 013NEWS

=== Gauteng ===
- The Rising Sun Community Newspapers - Lenasia
- City Mag
- The Citizen
- The Fordsburg Independent Newspaper
- The Joburg Times
- Rekord
- Mapepeza Community Newspaper (multilingual black-owned press)
- The Jozi Chronicle
- The Laudium Sun
- The Lenasia Sun
- Pretoria News
- Pretoria News Weekend
- The Saturday Star
- Sowetan
- Spotlight News (Gauteng Provincial monthly newspaper)
- The Star
- Super Saturday Citizen
- tame TIMES
- The Times
- Townpress Newspaper

=== KwaZulu-Natal ===
- Mzansi Magazine
- The Daily News
- Ilanga
- Ilanga langeSonto
- The Independent on Saturday
- Isolezwe
- Isolezwe ngeSonto
- Isolezwe ngoMgqibelo
- The Mercury
- Forever Yena Newspaper
- Post
- The Rising Sun Community Newspapers - Chatsworth
- The Rising Sun Community Newspapers - Overport
- The Rising Sun Community Newspapers - North Coast
- The Rising Sun Community Newspapers - Merebank
- The Rising Sun Community Newspapers - Mid South Coast
- Sunday Tribune
- Tabloid Media
- UmAfrika
- Weekend Witness
- The Witness
- The Zululand Observer
- Isambane News

=== Free State ===
- Arts Ya Rona
- Free State Central News
- DumelangNews
- Express
- Free State News
- Free State Sun
- Free State Times
- Indigo mag
- Issue
- The Media News
- Saterdag Volksblad
- The Sports Eye
- Volksblad
- Vista
- The Weekly

=== Northern Cape ===
- Diamond Fields Advertiser (DFA)
- Postmasburg Register

=== Eastern Cape ===
- Daily Dispatch and the Saturday Dispatch
- Go! & Express
- Grocott's Mail
- I'solezwe lesiXhosa
- The Herald
- UD Newspaper
- Weekend Post
- Graaff-Reinet Advertiser

=== Western Cape ===
- Breederivier Gazette
- Die Burger
- Die Burger Saterdag
- Cape Argus
- Cape Times
- Daily Voice
- District Mail
- Drakenstein Gazette
- Eikestadnuus
- Helderberg Gazette
- Hermanus Times
- Paarl Post
- Die Son
- Son op Sondag
- Stellenbosch Gazette
- Swartland Gazette
- Theewaterskloof Gazette
- Vukani
- Weekend Argus (Saturday edition)
- Weekend Argus (Sunday edition)
- Weskusnuus
- Weslander
- Worcester Standard

=== Limpopo ===
- Limpopo Mirror

== Student/university publications ==
- The Conduit - Durban University of Technology
- IRAWA Post - University of the Free State
- Journalismiziko - Durban University of Technology
- Die Matie - University of Stellenbosch
- NMMYou - Nelson Mandela Metropolitan University
- Nux - University of KwaZulu Natal
- PDBY - University of Pretoria
- Speculum - Central University of Technology, Free State
- UJ Observer - University of Johannesburg
- Varsity - University of Cape Town
- Wapad - North-West University
- Vuvuzela - University of the Witwatersrand

== Online only publications ==
- AMC
- ANC Today
- The Continent
- Vula-Vala
- FiND iT
- Newssnatch
- The South African
- The Daily VOX
- EBNewsDaily
- Eyewitness News
- Saffarazzi News
- Forever Yena Newspaper
- GroundUp (news agency)
- Indian Spice
- Mamba Online
- Maroela Media
- MatieMedia - University of Stellenbosch
- Mayihlome News
- SurgeZirc SA
- News Everyday
- Property Wheel News

== Regional/community publications ==
These newspapers only serve small regions, towns, or communities within larger cities, or have a small circulation.

=== Limpopo ===
- Bonus Review
- Capricorn Voice
- Daller
- Die Bosvelder
- Die Pos
- Die Zoutpansberger
- Far North Bulletin
- Hoedspruit Herald
- Letaba Herald
- Mopani Herald
- Phalaborwa Herald
- Polokwane Review
- The Review

=== Mpumalanga ===
- Echo/Ridge Times
- Ermelo Insig
- Highvelder
- Lowvelder
- Middelburg Observer
- Mpumalanga News
- Standerton Advertiser
- Steelburger
- White River Post
- Witbank News

=== North West ===
- Brits Pos
- Klerksdorp Record
- Noordwester
- Platinum Weekblad
- Rustenburg Herald
- Witbank News

=== Gauteng ===
- Alberton Record
- Alex News
- Bedford and Edenvale News
- Benoni City Times
- Boksburg Advertiser
- Brakpan Herald
- Cosmos Gazette
- Fourways Review
- Germiston City News
- Kempton Express
- Krugersdorp News
- Leisure Options
- Lenasia Times
- Midrand Reporter
- North Eastern Tribune
- Northcliff Melville Times
- Randburg Sun
- Randfontein Herald
- Rekord Central
- Rekord Centurion
- Rekord East
- Rekord Far East
- Rekord Mamelodi
- Rekord Moot
- Rekord North
- Rekord Noweto
- Rekord West
- Rising Sun Lenasia
- Roodepoort Northsider
- Roodepoort Record
- Rosebank Killarney Gazette
- Sandton Chronicle
- Southern Courier
- Southern Echo Lenasia
- Streeknuus
- tame TIMES
- Tembisan
- West Rand Window

=== KwaZulu-Natal ===
- Berea Mail
- Estcourt & Midlands News
- Highway Mail
- Ladysmith Gazette
- Mid South Coast Mail/Mid South Coast Rising Sun
- Midlands Herald
- Newcastle Advertiser
- Newcastle Sun
- Northglen News
- Rising Sun Chatsworth
- South Coast Herald
- South Coast Sun
- Thisability
- uMlozi Wezindaba
- Village Talk
- Vryheid Herald
- Zululand Observer

=== Free State ===
- Bloemnuus
- Bloemfontein Courant
- Kasi News
- Kroonnuus
- Maluti
- Masilonyana News
- Ons Stad
- Vista
- Vrystaat

=== Northern Cape ===
- Gemsbok
- Kuruman Bulletin
- Noordkaap

=== Eastern Cape ===
- Aliwal News/Nuus
- Barkly East Reporter
- Grocott's Mail

=== Western Cape ===
- Atlantic Sun
- Bolander
- Breederivier Gazette
- City Vision
- Constantiaberg Bulletin
- CXpress
- Die Courant
- Die Hoorn
- DistrictMail
- Eikestad Nuus
- George Herald
- Helderberg Gazette
- Hermanus Times
- Idinga
- Knysna-Plett Herald
- Mossell Bay Advertiser
- Oudtshoorn Courant
- Overberg Venster
- Paarl Post
- People's Post
- Southern Suburbs Tatler
- Suid-Kaap Forum
- Swartland Gazette
- The Edge
- TygerBurger
- Tygertalk
- Village News
- Weslander

== Defunct ==
These newspapers are no longer published.

- Afrikaner Yidishe Tsaytung
- The Burghersdorp Gazette
- The Cape Chronicle
- The Daily Independent
- De Oude Emigrant
- The Friend
- Hoofstad
- The Indian Views
- The Lantern
- Highlands Herald
- The Middelburg Gazette
- Moxwêra wa Babaso
- New Nation
- Nova
- Oggendblad
- Oosterlig
- Rand Daily Mail
- Rayton News/Nuus
- South
- Sunday Express
- The New Age
- ThisDay
- Die Transvaler
- Die Vaderland
- Vrye Weekblad
- Weekend Mirror
- The Zingari

== See also ==
- Media of South Africa
- List of South African media
- Xhosa language newspapers
- South African Audience Research Foundation (SAARF)
- Online newspapers published in South Africa
- South African news websites

== Bibliography ==
- "The Press". Twentieth Century Impressions of Natal: Its People, Commerce, Industries, and Resources. Twentieth Century Impressions. Lloyd's Greater Britain Publishing Company. 1906.
- "The Colonial Press: List of newspapers, magazines, &c., filed in the library of the Royal Colonial Institute: South Africa", Proceedings of the Royal Colonial Institute, vol. 38, London, pp. 71–78, 1907
- "South Africa: Directory: the Press". Africa South of the Sahara 2003. Regional Surveys of the World. Europa Publications. 2003. ISBN 9781857431315. ISSN 0065-3896.
- "South Africa", Digital News Report, UK: Reuters Institute for the Study of Journalism, University of Oxford, 2020, OCLC 854746354
