= Toby Shapshak =

Journalist, editor and publisher of the South African edition of Stuff magazine

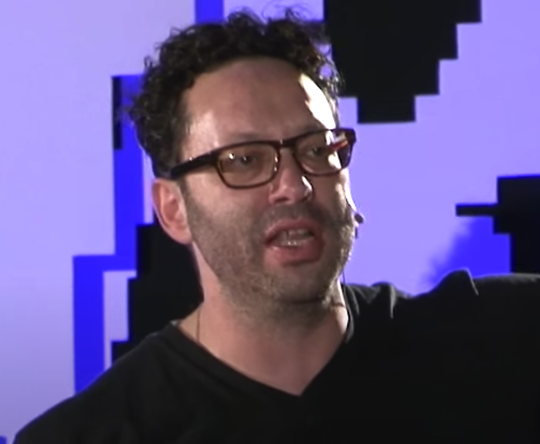
- "In Africa, necessity is the mother of innovation" presentation July 2012
- Education: BA (Journalism)
- Alma mater: Rhodes University
- Occupations: Journalist; Editor
- Known for: Editor of Stuff magazine
- Website: stuff.co.za

Toby Shapshak is a South African journalist, editor and publisher of the South African edition of Stuff magazine and writes a weekly opinion column for the Financial Mail, called Pattern Recognition and a column for Forbes magazine. Formerly a senior newspaper reporter covering everything from crime to politics, he has been writing about innovation, telecoms and the internet and the impact it has on Africa for more than 20 years.

== Education and career ==
Shapshak attended Higlands North high school and graduated from Rhodes University in Grahamstown, South Africa in 1992 with a BA in journalism. One of his first jobs was to shadow Nelson Mandela when he was president, and to report on the Truth and Reconciliation Commission.

He worked at the Mail & Guardian from 1998 to 2000 in the positions of sports editor, technology editor, news editor and acting editor. Shapshak was senior writer and section editor at ThisDay newspaper, from its opening in October 2013 until it closed a year later owing to financial difficulties experienced by the owner. This was followed by a short stint as contributing editor at BestLife magazine. For 8 years he was contributing editor and South African Bureau chief at GQ South Africa. He also worked at Avusa media, Business Day and The Times.

In 2001, Shapshak started Maven Media and in 2007 started publishing the South African edition of Stuff Magazine, of which he is owner and managing director. In 2013 he started contributing to the Financial Mail, with a technology column called Pattern Recognition and a column for Forbes magazine in 2017.

Shapshak and Aki Anastasiou hosted TechBusters, a weekly TV show on CNBC Africa from 2013 to 2016. In 2018 he was co-curator of the Creativate Digital Arts Festival in Grahamstown.

== Recognition ==
Shapshak has spoken at events such as TED, SxSW, Intel’s IDF conference in San Francisco, Tech4Africa, Sweden’s The Conference, AfricaCom in Cape Town and Germany's Zukunftskongress.

Shapshak has appeared on CNN, was included in the Mail & Guardian's list of Young South Africans in 2009, was listed as one of GQ's Top 30 men in media and was the ICT Journalist of the Year in 2002.
