= Beeld =

Afrikaans-language daily newspaper

- Type: Daily newspaper
- Format: Broadsheet
- Owner: Naspers
- Publisher: Media24
- Editor-in-chief: Barnard Beukman
- Founded: 16 September 1974
- Language: Afrikaans
- Headquarters: Johannesburg
- Sister newspapers: Die Burger, Volksblad
- Website: www.beeld.com

Beeld (freely translated as Picture or Image) is an Afrikaans-language daily newspaper that was launched on 16 September 1974. Beeld is distributed in four provinces of South Africa: Gauteng, Mpumalanga, Limpopo and North West, previously part of the former Transvaal province. Die Beeld (English: The Image) was an Afrikaans-language Sunday newspaper in the late 1960s.

== History ==
The newspaper was aligned with the National Party and apartheid policies. In later years, the newspaper was seen to be more aligned with the Democratic Party.

In April 1981, Joseph Lelyveld of The New York Times praised Beeld editor Ton Vosloo over a "courageous" article he had recently written. Vosloo had written that the National Party would eventually have to enter negotiations with the leadership of the African National Congress. Significantly, Ton described the ANC as "the National Party of Black Nationalism." In July 1981, the newspaper took issue with Piet Koornhof, minister responsible for black affairs in P.W. Botha's cabinet. Koornhof had reassured the white electorate that racially desegregated public spaces in white areas would not be "swamped" or "crowded out". He suggested racially segregated bridges and keeping facilities open to all races on weekdays and racially segregated on weekends, for the exclusive use of whites. The newspaper accused Koornhof of resurrecting "prehistoric debates" of the early apartheid era and questioned how the white minority can gain the support of nonwhites "if in 1981 we speak of separate bridges a la 1948." In a January 1982 editorial by Vosloo, prior to the opening of parliament, he called on Prime Minister P.W. Botha for political change: "We are waiting, Mr. Botha, we are waiting!"

In June 2024 Naspers announced that it would close the newspaper, along with City Press, Rapport, and the Daily Sun, in October of that year due to declining newspaper sales. A month later Media24 announced it will suspend the planned closures until the Competition Commission approves of its plan to sell newspaper distribution company On-The-Dot to Novus, which was the reason behind the papers' planned shuttering. The last print edition was published on Friday 21 December 2024, and it is now available online only.

== List of editors ==
- Schalk Pienaar (1974–1975)
- Johannes Grosskopf (1975–1977)
- Ton Vosloo (1977–1983)
- Willem Wepener (1983–1989)
- Salie de Swardt (1989–1992)
- Willie Kühn (1993–1996)
- Johan de Wet (1996–1999)
- Arrie Rossouw (1999–2000)
- Peet Kruger (2000–2009)
- Tim du Plessis (2009–2011)
- Peet Kruger (2011–2013)
- Adriaan Basson (2013–2015)
- Barnard Beukman (2015–2024)

== Distribution areas ==
Distribution
	2008	2014
Eastern Cape		
Free State	Y	Y
Gauteng	Y	Y
Kwa-Zulu Natal	Y	N
Limpopo	Y	Y
Mpumalanga	Y	Y
North West	Y	Y

== Distribution figures ==
Circulation
	Net Sales
2000	100 000
Oct – Dec 2012	66 132
Jul – Sep 2012	70 070
Apr – Jun 2012	73 595
Jan – Mar 2012	75 019
Oct – Dec 2013	64 874
Jul – Sep 2013	64 329
Apr – Jun 2013	64 073
Jan – Mar 2013	67 700
Jan – Mar 2014	62 766
Apr – Jun 2014	59 544
Jan – Mar 2015	51 064
2024	20 000

== Readership figures ==
Estimated Readership
	AIR
Jan 2012 – Dec 2012	441 000
Jan 2013 – Dec 2013	485 000

== See also ==
- List of newspapers in South Africa
