= Hermann Giliomee =

Hermann Buhr Giliomee
- Born: 4 April 1938 (age 87); Sterkstroom, South Africa
- Occupations: Academic and Author

Hermann Giliomee is an author of historical and political studies, former professor of Political Studies at the University of Cape Town (1983–2002), President of the South African Institute of Race Relations (1995–1997) and Extraordinary Professor of History at the Stellenbosch University.

He co-founded Die Suid-Afrikaans, an Afrikaans journal of opinion in 1984. Giliomee was a regular columnist for the Cape Times, The Rand Daily Mail and other periodicals from 1980 to 1997 and is writing a political column for the Afrikaans morning newspapers Die Burger, Beeld and Volksblad.

== Books by Hermann Giliomee ==
- Ethnic power mobilized – Can South Africa change ? (Co-author: Heribert Adam), Yale University Press, 1979
- Die Kaap tydens die eerste Britse bewind, 1795–1803, 1971
- The parting of the ways, 1982
- Up against the fences, 1985
- The Shaping of South African Society 1652–1840, 1988
- From apartheid to nation-building, 1989
- Negotiating South Africa's future, 1989
- The Bold experiment, 1994
- The awkward embrace, 1999
- Kruispad, 2001
- The Afrikaners: biography of a people, 2003, ISBN 0-8139-2237-2, University of Virginia Press / Tafelberg Publishers;
  expanded and updated edition, 2010, ISBN 0813930553
- Die Afrikaners: `n Biografie, 2004
- 'n Vaste plek vir Afrikaans (Co-author: Lawrence Schlemmer), Protea Boekhuis, 2006
- Nog altyd hier gewees – Die storie van 'n Stellenbosse gemeenskap, Tafelberg, 2007
- New History of South Africa, ISBN 978-0624043591, both Co-editor: Bernard Mbenga, 2007, 464 pp, 600 illustrations
  Nuwe geskiedenis van Suid-Afrika, ISBN 9780624043584
