= Paarl Post =

Newspaper in South Africa

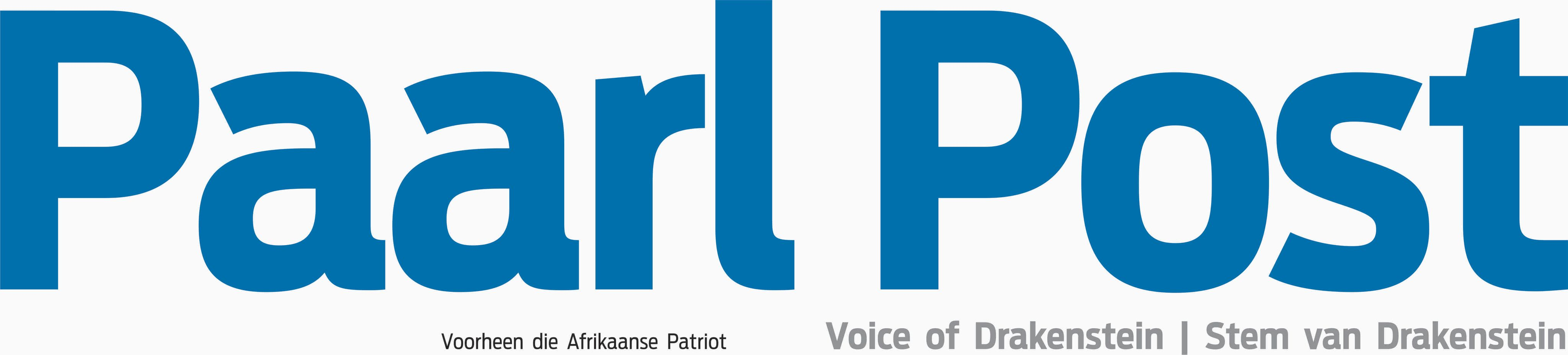
- Type: Daily newspaper
- Format: Print and Online
- Owner: Media24
- Founder: Genootskap van Regte Afrikaners
- Publisher: Media24
- Founded: 14 January 1905
- Language: English, Afrikaans
- Headquarters: Paarl, South Africa
- Website: paarlpost.co.za

The Paarl Post is a South Africa newspaper distributed mainly in Paarl, Wellington and Franschhoek in the Western Cape. It is a bilingual weekly in Afrikaans and English with a circulation of 17,000 copies. The readership is estimated at 92,000 and is largely Afrikaans-speaking.

The newspaper usually has 32 to 48 pages and is printed in tabloid format. The content focuses on general news, sport, social life and entertainment. It also contains supplements dedicated to business and the property market.

== History ==
The Paarl Post was first published on 14 January 1905 and is the successor to Die Afrikaanse Patriot, the first Afrikaans newspaper in South Africa. In 1995, Media24, a subsidiary of the Naspers media group, acquired a 50% share. Naspers increased their stake to 75% in 2002. Since then, the Paarl Post has been owned by the Boland Newspapers media group, which publishes fourteen local titles, and is itself a subsidiary of Naspers.
