= Arena Holdings =

South African media company

- Type: Subsidiary
- Industry: Media
- Predecessor: Johnnic Communications; Avusa; Times Media Group; Tiso Blackstar Group
- Founded: 2019
- Headquarters: Johannesburg, South Africa
- Key people: Pule Molebeledi (acting CEO)
- Products: Publishing, entertainment, retail
- Parent: Lebashe Investment Group
- Website: arena.africa

Arena Holdings, formerly known as Tiso Blackstar Group, Johnnic Communications, Avusa and the Times Media Group, is a South African media company based in Johannesburg, South Africa. It publishes several major South African newspapers, including the Sunday Times, Business Day, Financial Mail, Herald, Sowetan and Daily Dispatch. It acquired its current name in 2019 when it was acquired by Lebashe Investment Group, the current owner of the company.

== History ==
Arena Holdings's media assets originated in the publishing stable of the Omni Media Corporation, which was owned by Anglo American until the latter unbundled various media assets during the black economic empowerment (BEE) boom of the early post-apartheid period. Control of the media assets (then held under Times Media Limited) vested in Johnnic Holdings Limited, which was controlled by the BEE group National Empowerment Consortium.

Johnnic Holdings restructured in 2000, creating Johnnic Communications (Johncom) from the entertainment and publishing assets of the former Omni Media Corporation. By 2003, Johncom was valued at between R1.5 billion and R2 billion, and the following year its wholly owned subsidiary, Johnnic Publishing, acquired New Africa Publications – which owned 100 per cent of the influential Sowetan newspaper – from New Africa Investments Limited. In March 2005, Johnnic Holdings unbundled its entire 62.5 per cent shareholding in Johncom, as Johnnic Holdings moved to refocus on the hotels and gaming sector. In October 2007, Johncom announced a proposal to change its name to Avusa in order to distinguish itself from its former parent company.

Shortly afterwards, in November 2007, a company called Koni Media Holdings launched a R7-billion bid to take over 100 per cent of Avusa, possibly with funding from the state-owned asset manager, the Public Investment Corporation. Because Koni Media's shareholders also included three high-level government officials – Titus Mafolo, Ronnie Mamoepa and Billy Modise – there was wide speculation that President Thabo Mbeki's government was involved in the takeover bid, a claim strongly denied by Koni Media and by Mbeki. The deal did not go through.

The Mvelaphanda Group launched a bid to take over Avusa in 2012, and in September of that year it unbundled Avusa's media assets into a new holding company, Times Media Group (formerly a Mvelaphanda subsidiary named Richtrau 229), which listed on the JSE on 25 September. In 2013, the Times Media Group took full ownership of BDFM (the publisher of the Business Day and Financial Mail), buying Pearson's 50 per cent stake in the venture. However, in the same year, Times Media sold Exclusive Books to a private equity firm in September 2013, and it sold Nu Metro to another private equity firm in January 2014.

The Blackstar Group (newly renamed Tiso Blackstar Group) acquired full ownership of the Times Media Group in June 2015, and the latter was renamed as Tiso Blackstar Group in June 2017. However, in 2019, Tiso Blackstar Group sold its print, broadcasting, and content assets to Lebashe Investment Group for R1.05 billion; Lebashe rebundled the assets in a new company called Arena Holdings. In September 2023, Arena Holdings announced that it was restructuring its news and entertainment businesses.

== Publications and services ==
=== Magazines ===
- Computing SA
- Elle
- Financial Mail
- Home Owner
- SA Mining
- Soccerlife
- Top Huis

=== Newspapers ===
- Business Day
- Daily Dispatch
- The Herald
- The Sowetan
- The Sunday Times
- Sunday World
- The Times
- Weekend Post
- Times Media community newspapers
  - Algoa Sun
  - Go! & Express
  - Our Times
  - The Rep
  - Talk of the Town

=== Publishers ===
- New Holland Publishers
- Mediaguide
- Picasso Headline (pty) Ltd.

=== Digital ===
Avusa created a network of its own websites, named Times Media Live, in 2010. In 2011 this network began to expand from three sites to 21 in 2014, made up mostly of disparate websites within the Group (Times Live, Sowetan Live, BDLIVE, Financial Mail, HeraldLive and more) including the African representation of The Daily Telegraph. In doing so, Times Media Live became the second-largest publisher network and thereafter, Times Live the second largest website in South Africa. Times Media Live was the first large media-owned publisher to reach profitability in the 2013 financial year. In 2014 The Rand Daily Mail was resuscitated as an online-only brand.

Picasso Headline currently publishes:

- African Leader — Quarterly magazine published on behalf of the Black Management Forum (BMF)
- SA Schools and Tertiary Collection — An annual directory of SA schools and tertiary institutions
- Rock, Surf and Deep RSD — A monthly on-shelf salt water fishing magazine, including African Angling Destinations Guides
- Voice of Local Government — Quarterly magazine published on behalf of the South African Local Government Association (SALGA)
- Digest of SA Architecture — Annual magazine showcasing projects of the year, published on behalf of the SA Institute of Architects (SAIA), primarily for its members
- Architecture SA — Alternate monthly magazine published on behalf of the SA Institute of Architects (SAIA), primarily for its members
- New Agenda — A quarterly magazine published on behalf of the Institute for African Alternatives. This publication is the South African Journal of Social and Economic Policy.
- SA Banker — Quarterly magazine published on behalf of the Banking Association of South Africa (BASA) and the Institute of Bankers (IOB)
- Ochre Media — A film and television production company since 1999 who have produced Scandal!

In April 2019, Tiso Blacksar relaunched Vrye Weekblad.

=== Music ===
- Gallo Record Company

== See also ==
- List of South African media
- Naspers
- Independent News and Media
- Caxton/CTP
