= The Mercury (South Africa) =

South African newspaper

- Type: Morning daily newspaper
- Format: Broadsheet
- Owner(s): Independent Media (Pty) Ltd
- Editor: Yogas Nair
- Deputy editor: Bruce Colly
- News editor: Philani Makhanya
- Founded: 1852
- Headquarters: 18 Osborne Street, Greyville, Durban, South Africa
- Sister newspapers: Daily News; The Independent on Saturday; Sunday Tribune; Isolezwe; Post
- Website: www.iol.co.za/mercury

The Mercury, formerly The Natal Mercury, is an English-language newspaper owned by Independent Media (Pty) Ltd, a subsidiary of Iqbal Survé's Sekunjalo Investments and published in Durban, South Africa.

== Content ==
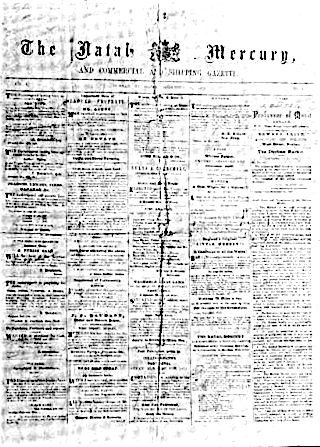
Natal Mercury, 1852

The paper focuses on the important national and local news of the day, with background and analysis.

The daily Business Report within The Mercury contains news on international market trends, and national company and business news.

Weekly supplements include the GoodLife, Motoring, and Network. Network (on Wednesday) specifically focuses on KZN business, property and shipping news. The Zululand and Pietermaritzburg areas are specifically covered within Network. The Mercury includes dedicated golf pages on Tuesday.

The Mercury also contains local entertainment and arts news. The Friday edition includes a guide to weekend events in KZN.

== See also ==
- List of newspapers in South Africa

== Bibliography ==
- Terry Wilks: For the Love of Natal: The Life and Times of the Natal Mercury 1852–1977. The Natal Mercury, Durban/Pinetown 1977.
