= Ferial Haffajee =

South African journalist and newspaper editor (born 1967)

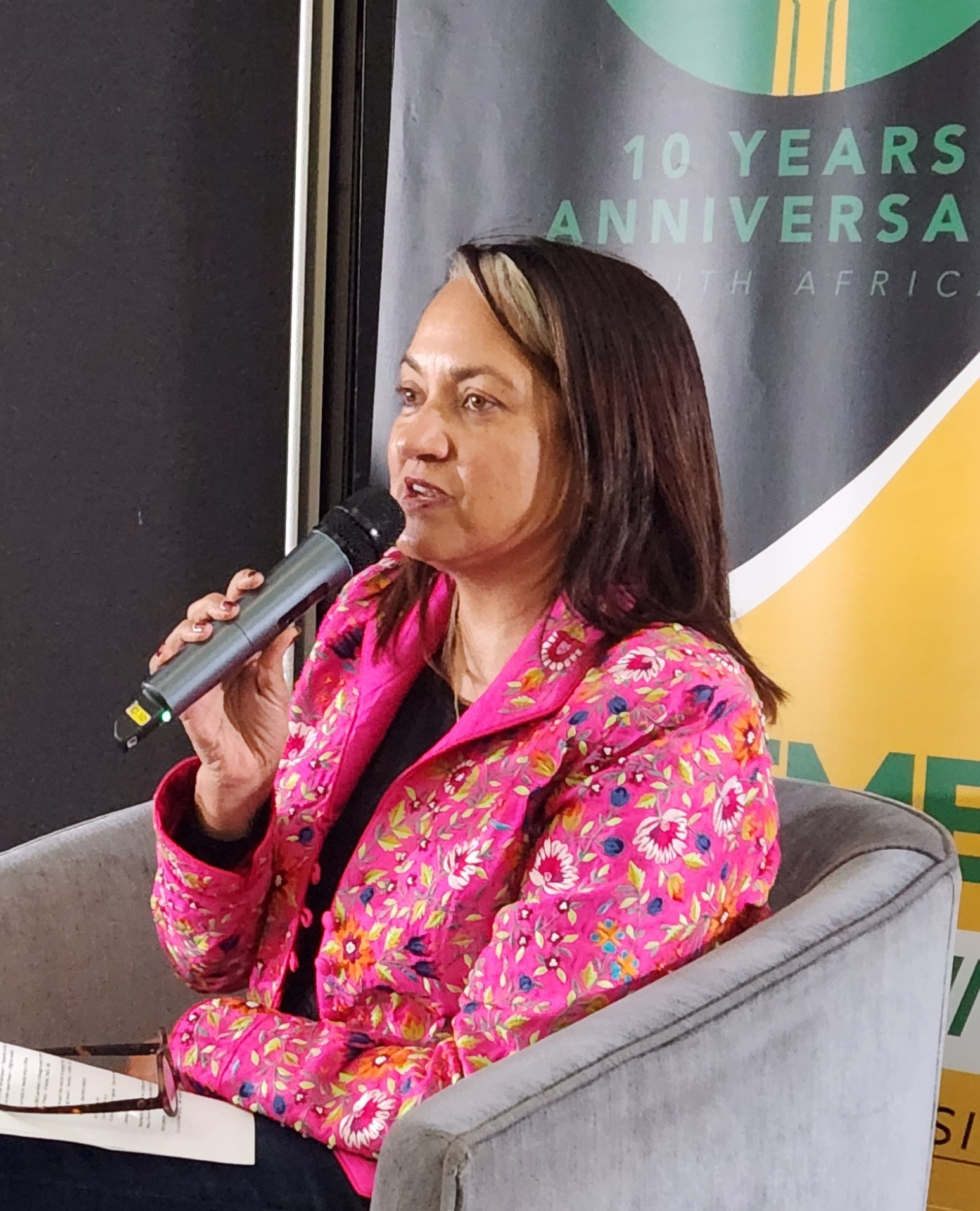
- Farial Haffajee speaking at Wiki Indaba 2024.
- Born: 20 February 1967 (age 59)
- Education: University of the Witwatersrand
- Occupations: Journalist; newspaper editor; author

Ferial Haffajee (born 20 February 1967) is a South African journalist and newspaper editor. Haffajee was editor of City Press newspaper from July 2009 until July 2016 and was previously the editor of the Mail & Guardian newspaper.

Haffajee was awarded the 2014 International Press Freedom Award by the Committee to Protect Journalists and was appointed to the board of the International Press Institute in 2011.

Haffajee is currently Associate Editor at the Daily Maverick, and was previously editor-at-large at HuffPost South Africa until it ended its partnership with Media24 in 2018.

== Early life and career ==
Haffajee grew up in Bosmont, a suburb of Johannesburg. Her father was a clothing factory worker. She is an alumna of the University of the Witwatersrand.

Haffajee was a cub reporter at Mail & Guardian and has acted as its associate editor, media editor and economics writer at various times. Before taking up the editorship she held jobs at state broadcaster SABC, as a radio producer and television reporter, and at the Financial Mail magazine, where she was a senior editor responsible for political coverage and the managing editor.

== Mail & Guardian editorship ==
Haffajee was appointed editor of Mail & Guardian at the age of 36 effective from 1 February 2004, two years after control of the paper was acquired by Zimbabwean publisher Trevor Ncube.

In 2005 the paper became one of the few publications, after the regime change of 1994, interdicted from publishing specific stories. In 2006 the paper was again interdicted, and Haffajee threatened, after republishing controversial cartoons depicting Muhammad.

In March 2009 Mail & Guardian announced Haffajee's resignation, saying she would take up the position of editor of City Press in July. Previous speculation had identified her as a potential appointee as head of news at the SABC.

== Publication ==
- Haffajee, Ferial (2015). What If There Were No Whites In South Africa?. Johannesburg: Picador Africa. ISBN 9781770104402. received mixed reviews. One reviewer wrote "the central thrust of the book... argues that black South Africans, especially the new generation of young black, 'born frees', are obsessed with whiteness and white privilege". Haffajee's contention is that if all whites had left South Africa and their wealth divided among the poor, poverty would hardly have been dented. The controversial Dan Roodt has noted that underlying her "pastiche of Bosmont memoir, office gossip, antiwhite resentment and racial econometrics, is the idea that whites should ideally disappear".
