= UpperCase Media =

South African magazine publishing company

UpperCase Media (Pty) Ltd.
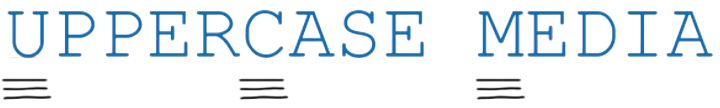
- Industry: Publishing
- Founded: 1999; 27 years ago
- Headquarters: Cape Town, South Africa
- Parent: Media24 Ltd.

UpperCase Media (Pty) Ltd. is a magazine publishing company headquartered in Cape Town, South Africa. The company, which was founded in 1999, publishes the South African edition of the British magazines ZOO Weekly, Heat and FHM.

In August 2008, the company merged with Media24, publisher of City Press. Under the terms of the agreement, UpperCase Media became a wholly owned subsidiary of Media 24.
