= The Rand Daily Mail =

South African newspaper

- Front page of the Rand Daily Mail
- Type: Daily newspaper
- Format: Broadsheet
- Owner: Times Media Group
- Publisher: Clive Kinsley
- Editor: Ray Hartley
- Staff writers: 15
- Founded: 1902
- Ceased publication: 1985
- Relaunched: 2014
- Political alignment: Liberal
- Headquarters: Johannesburg
- Website: www.rdm.co.za

The Rand Daily Mail was a South African newspaper published from 1902 until it was controversially closed in 1985 after adopting an outspoken anti-apartheid stance in the midst of a massive clampdown on activists by the security forces. The title was based in Johannesburg as a daily newspaper and best known for breaking the news about the apartheid state's Muldergate Scandal in 1979. It also exposed the truth about the death in custody of anti-apartheid activist Steve Biko, in 1977.

The Rand Daily Mail was resurrected as a website by Times Media Group, who hold rights to the original title, in October 2014.

== History ==
The Rand Daily Mail was founded in 1902 by businessman Harry Cohen and managed by editor Edgar Wallace. Cohen purchased the linotype machines and printing presses for the newspaper from Emmanuel Mendelssohn, equipment from the defunct The Standard and Diggers' News. Extravagant operational expenses by Wallace almost bankrupted the newspaper and Cohen had to step in to limited spending. It was bought by mining magnate Abe Bailey in 1905 after the death of Harry Cohen, after the intervention of Lord Milner who feared it would be purchased by Boer nationalists, and Bailey formed a company called the Rand Daily Mails Ltd. Bailey leased the paper out to three people, George H. Kingswell, who became the general manager, Ralph Ward Jackson its editor and A. V. Lindbergh its distributor as CNA chairman. The three men would go on to form The Sunday Times which worked in conjunction with the paper. By 1910, the company help form the Reuters branch called the Reuters South African Press Agency.

By May 1915, Rand Daily Mails Ltd (RDM) absorbed the Transvaal Leader when the Cape Times Ltd sold it for shares in the RDM and became the only morning newspaper in Johannesburg but that shareholding was soon bought out by Abe Bailey. In 1920, an agreement was reached by the Argus Group, Rand Daily Mails Ltd and Sunday Times not to publish papers that competed with the three companies and this agreement lasted until 1968. In 1929, the RDM and Argus Group bought out the Pretoria News though the Argus Group held the majority shareholding.

In 1934 I. W. Schlesinger's created competition when he formed the Sunday Express and then in 1937, the Daily Express. In an attempt to control the newspaper market, the RDM, Sunday Times and Argus group bought out Schlesinger's newspaper interests in 1939, closing down the Daily Tribune (Durban), Daily Express (Johannesburg) and Sunday Tribune (Durban) but kept the Sunday Express (Johannesburg).

In 1955 the Rand Daily Mail and Sunday Times formed a single company called the South African Associated Newspapers (SAAN), the second largest newspaper group at the time.

During the apartheid years, journalists like Benjamin Pogrund reported on political and economic issues affecting black South Africans about which whites were largely ignorant. Pogrund, for example, reported on the Sharpeville massacre of 1960. In 1965 Pogrund wrote in the paper about prison conditions, based on the evidence of prisoners including Harold Strachan. Strachan was sent to prison for a year and a half as a result.

On 3 November 1978 Rand Daily Mail journalists Mervyn Rees and Chris Day reported on the use of public funds since 1973 to set up a disinformation network in South Africa and abroad. The money was used in attempts to buy The Washington Star, and to set up The Citizen as a government-controlled counter to The Rand Daily Mail.

Hounded by the state, the paper's board decided to moderate its content for the sake of attracting more affluent white readers. This strategy led to financial losses and the newspaper was forced to close in 1985, eighty-three years after it was founded.

After its closure, the black newspaper The Sowetan described The Rand Daily Mail as the first white newspaper to regard blacks as human beings. Yet for most of the apartheid period (1948–1990) the paper suffered from poor management, government infiltration, and state censorship. The management often tried to replace more liberal editors with conservative ones.

After the closure of The Rand Daily Mail, some of its journalists (like Anton Harber and Irwin Manoim) pooled their severance pay to start the Weekly Mail (now Mail & Guardian), which carried on the anti-apartheid stance of its predecessor.

== Resurrection as a website ==
Times Media Group held the rights to The Rand Daily Mail, and in 2014 decided to relaunch the title as an online-only brand, utilising opinion content from its stable of newspapers, including The Sunday Times, The Times, Business Day, the Financial Mail, The Sowetan, The Herald, the Daily Dispatch and the Weekend Post.

In 2019 the Rand Daily Mail was merged into BusinessLIVE.

== Editors ==
- 1902–1903: Edgar Wallace
- 1903–1904: George Adamson
- 1904–1921: Ralph Ward Jackson
- 1921–1924: L.E. Neame
- 1924–1941: Lewis Rose MacLeod
- 1941–1953: George Rayner Ellis
- 1953–1957: A.P. Cartwright
- 1957–1965: Laurence Gandar (1915–1998)
- 1965–1977: Raymond Louw
- 1977–1981: Allister Sparks
- 2014 – current: Ray Hartley

== See also ==
- List of newspapers in South Africa
- Helen Zille
- Charles Gordon McClure (1885–1933), also known as Dyke White, cartoonist

== Notes and references ==
- Hachten, William A.; Giffard, C. Anthony (1984). The Press and Apartheid: Repression and Propaganda in South Africa. University of Wisconsin Press. ISBN 978-0-608-01935-2.
- Pogrund, Benjamin (2000). War of Words: Memoir of a South African Journalist. Seven Stories Press. ISBN 978-1-888363-71-5.
- Rees, Mervyn; Day, Chris (1980). Muldergate: The Story of the Info Scandal. Macmillan South Africa. ISBN 978-0-86954-089-3.
- Wills, Walter H. (2006). The Anglo-African Who's Who and Biographical Sketchbook, 1907. Jeppestown Press. ISBN 978-0-9553936-3-1.
- Merrill, John Calhoun; Fisher, Harold A. (1980). The world's great dailies: profiles of fifty newspapers. Hastings House. pp. 256–263. ISBN 978-0-8038-8095-5.
- Knight, Robin (June 12, 2000). "The Daily Courage". TIME. Vol. 155, no. 23.
