= Edward-John Bottomley =

South African journalist and author

- Born: North West, South Africa
- Education: Stellenbosch University; University of Cambridge
- Occupations: Journalist and author

Edward-John Bottomley is a South African journalist and author. He is a senior journalist at Sake 24, part of the Media24 group and South Africa's only Afrikaans business paper. His work is regularly published in English and in Afrikaans.

== Background ==
Bottomley holds journalism and geography degrees from Stellenbosch University and a master's degree at the University of Cambridge, with research on the geographical history of poor whites in South Africa.

=== Armblankes/Poor White ===
In 2012, Bottomley published a popular version of his research on poor whites in South Africa. His book, titled Armblanke in the Afrikaans edition and Poor White in the English-language counterpart looks at the response of those in power to this issue, from the government to the church. Bottomley also traces the historical roots of the issue, looking at the situation in the late 19th century, the inquests on white poverty in the early 20th century and the National Party's response to white poverty.
