= The Corkman =

Irish newspaper

- Type: Weekly regional newspaper
- Format: Tabloid, paper, E-paper
- Owner: Mediahuis Ireland
- Editor: Kevin Hughes
- Headquarters: Mallow, County Cork
- ISSN: 1649-6132
- Website: independent.ie/regionals/corkman

The Corkman is a weekly Irish regional newspaper based in County Cork. It is part of the Corkman Group and owned by Mediahuis Ireland. The paper, based in Mallow, was primarily a North Cork newspaper. As of 2009, The Corkman was published in three editions, covering North Cork, Muskerry and Avondhu.

According to the Audit Bureau of Circulations, it had an average circulation of 8,186 for the period ending June 2005.

== History ==
The Corkman was first published in the 1950s. Originally released as a Cork-focused edition of The Kerryman, it was published as an independent title from April 1966. During the 1960s its correspondents included Jeremiah Cronin, who left the newspaper following his election to Dáil Éireann. Based in The Spa area of Mallow, the organisation's offices reportedly had one of the "highest radon levels ever found in Ireland" in 2007.

Originally published as a broadsheet title, it changed to a "compact" format in 2009.

As of 2006, the newspaper's editor was Brendan Malone. Kevin Hughes was appointed editor of The Corkman and The Kerryman in 2015.
