= Independent media (disambiguation) =

Independent media is media, such as television, newspapers, or Internet-based publications, that is free of influence by government or corporate interests.

Independent media may also refer to:

- Mediahuis Ireland the Irish media group formerly called Independent News and Media (INM)
- Independent Media (publisher) the former Russian publisher

== See also ==
- Independent Media Center, an international open publishing network
