= Nux =

Nux or NUX may refer to:

- National Union of Ex-Service Men, a defunct association of military veterans in the United Kingdom
- Nux (newspaper), a student newspaper at the University of KwaZulu-Natal
- Nux, one of the main characters in the film Mad Max: Fury Road
- NUX Organization, a Japanese record label
- "Nux" (poem), a Latin poem spuriously attributed to Ovid
- NUX, the IATA airport code for Novy Urengoy Airport in Yamalia Okrug, Russia
- Nux (chocolate bar). a British confection produced by Rowntree's
- Nux, the Latin word for "nut" or "nut tree" used in several species names

== See also ==
- Nux vomica, a deciduous tree with poisonous fruit native to South and Southeast Asia
- Nux Vomica, a 2006 album by indie rock band the Veils
