= Daily Voice (South African newspaper) =

Newspaper

- Ons Skrik Vir Niks
- Type: Daily newspaper
- Format: Tabloid
- Owner(s): Sekunjalo Investments
- Editor: Taariq Halim
- Founded: 16 March 2005
- Headquarters: Cape Town, South Africa
- Website: www.dailyvoice.co.za

Daily Voice is a South African tabloid newspaper that is distributed on weekdays and published by Independent Newspapers (Pty) Limited (part of the greater Independent News & Media) in the Western Cape province. It is published in English, with Afrikaans mixed in. In late 2013, the Daily Voice was the most-read daily newspaper in the Cape Town metropolitan area with 456,000 readers, and a total daily readership of 528,000.

== History and focus ==
Daily Voice was launched on 16 March 2005 in the Western Cape, selling at the price of R1.50. Its publication was a reaction to the success of the tabloid Daily Sun, published by Media24 and begun in 2002, and was part of a "tabloidisation" wave in the country. The Daily Voice was also modelled after the tabloid The Sun in the UK.

Initially, the paper focused stories on their tag-line "sex, scandal, skinner, sport". Daily Voice has a team of local journalists to report on stories which are original, relevant and produced for their specific audience.

The motto of the paper in Afrikaans is "Ons skrik vir niks" (English: "We are not scared of anything"). The former executive editor, Karl Brophy, explained that the paper accommodates the socioeconomic classes who have perhaps been left out by the rest of the country's newspapers.

The Daily Voice attracts a dominant Cape Coloured community. The targeted readership speaks a mixture of English and Afrikaans, which is typical of the Cape Flats and is why the paper is multilingual.

The Daily Voice has a section where readers can share their views on stories and social issues by sending an SMS to the Rek Jou Bek (Have your own opinion) feature.

The Daily Voice has since been sold for R4.00 in Cape Town and surrounds, while its Afrikaans edition was distributed on the West Coast, in the Winelands, the Overberg and even as far as Oudtshoorn. The Afrikaans edition of the Daily Voice was discontinued in June 2013.

== Page 3 controversy ==
Page 3 of the Daily Voice used to depict a naked woman, which caused quite a stir. Many people saw the publication was defining women as sex symbols and this caused complaints and disapproving comments. In response to this, the chief executive, Tony Howard, of the paper's publishing house, Independent Newspapers, said that sex would be a key element, as with all tabloids, but it would complement rather than dominate other key selling parts. The nude Page 3 girl was dropped from the paper in 2010, and has been replaced by celebrity news.

== Team of journalists ==
The former executive editor of the Daily Voice was Karl Brophy. Brophy had been a spin doctor for the Irish Government and worked for the Daily Mirror in London, the Irish Examiner, and the Irish Independent. Brophy handed over to Elliott Sylvester in 2008. In 2011, the Irishman Shane Doran became editor. Doran was part of the Irish team sent to South Africa to oversee the Irish group's newspaper assets. In July 2013, Doran stepped down and returned to Ireland after Independent Newspapers was sold to Sekunjalo Investments. The Daily Voice chief sub-editor Taariq Halim was appointed acting editor, and in 2015 officially appointed as the new editor.

Editorial

- Wesley April (Editor)
- Megan Baadjies (Online Editor)
- Warda Salvester (News Editor)

Journalists

- Byron Lukas
- Monique Duval
- Tracy-Lynn Ruiters
- Marsha Dean

Sport

- Dudley Carstens (Sport Editor)
- Matthew Marcus
- Travis Arendse

Columnists

- Robert Jean-Jacques
- Bobby Brown
- Nick Feinberg
- Dudley Carstens
- Matthew Marcus
- Moeshfieka Botha
- Solly Lottering (Freelance)

== Distribution areas ==
Distribution
	2008	2013
Eastern Cape	Y	Y
Free State		
Gauteng		
Kwa-Zulu Natal		
Limpopo		
Mpumalanga		
North West		
Northern Cape		
Western Cape	Y	Y

== Readership figures ==
Estimated Readership
	AIR
Jan 2012 – Dec 2012	463 000
Jul 2011 – Jun 2012	493 000
Dec 2014	516 000 (AMPS)

== See also ==
- List of newspapers in South Africa
- Die Son, a similar newspaper, also based in Cape Town
