= Post (South Africa) =

South African English-language newspaper

- Owner: Independent News and Media SA
- Website: www.thepost.co.za

The Post is an English-language newspaper in South Africa owned by Independent News & Media and published in Durban, South Africa.

== Distribution areas ==
Distribution
| | 2008 | 2013 |
|---|---|---|
| Eastern Cape | | Y |
| Free State | | Y |
| Gauteng | Y | Y |
| Kwa-Zulu Natal | Y | Y |
| Limpopo | | |
| Mpumalanga | | |
| North West | | |
| Northern Cape | | |
| Western Cape | | |

== Distribution figures ==
Circulation
| | Net Sales |
|---|---|
| Oct–Dec 2012 | 44 683 |
| Jul–Sep 2012 | 44 585 |
| Apr–Jun 2012 | 43 994 |
| Jan–Mar 2012 | 44 942 |

== Readership figures ==
Estimated Readership
| | AIR |
|---|---|
| Jan–Dec 2012 | 345 000 |
| Jul 2011 – Jun 2012 | 339 000 |

== See also ==
- List of newspapers in South Africa
