= Vukani =

- Type: Weekly newspaper
- Headquarters: Cape Town
- Circulation: 76,009 (as of Q4 2025)

The Vukani is a local weekly newspaper distributed to the township areas of Cape Town, Western Cape, South Africa. It is written in Xhosa and English. Vukani means "Wake up" in both the isiZulu and isiXhosa languages. The newspaper covers items of interest to large communities in Khayelitsha, Langa, Nyanga and Gugulethu.

== See also ==
- List of newspapers in South Africa
