= Wits Vuvuzela =

University newspaper from South Africa

- Type: Newspaper
- Format: Online and print
- Owner: Wits Journalism
- Editor: Dinesh Balliah
- Founded: 2004
- Headquarters: University Corner, Braamfontein, Johannesburg
- Website: witsvuvuzela.com

The Wits Vuvuzela is the student newspaper of the University of the Witwatersrand (Wits) in South Africa. The newspaper is produced by the students of the Wits Department of Journalism, and appears in both printed and online formats. The print version has a circulation of 10,000 bi-monthly while the online newspaper attracts between 40-60,000 unique views per month.

== See also ==
- List of newspapers in South Africa
- Vuvuzela

== Website ==
- Vuvuzela online
