= Isolezwe =

Zulu-language newspaper in South Africa

- Type: Daily newspaper
- Format: Tabloid
- Owner: Independent News and Media SA
- Founded: 2002
- Language: Zulu
- Website: isolezwe.co.za

Isolezwe is a Zulu-language newspaper launched in 2002 by Independent News & Media. It is published daily in Durban, South Africa, in the tabloid format. Editor Kiki Ntuli describes their target market as "the modernising Zulu ... [s]omeone who may go back home to the rural areas to slaughter a cow to amadlozi [the ancestors], but is as equally comfortable taking his family out for dinner and a movie in a shopping mall".

In 2024, Isolezwe received a nomination for "Most Informative Online Publication" at the Behind The Scenes Awards (BTSA)) Other nominees in the same category included Zimoja Lezinto, Sunday World, Daily Sun, MDNtv, and Times Live. The Behind The Scenes Awards celebrate excellence in various media and entertainment fields within South Africa.

== History ==
In June 2004, Isolezwe launched their online edition; their fellow Independent News & Media publications described it as the first Zulu-language news website. In the five years after its founding, it performed much better than Independent's English-language South African dailies, growing from a circulation of under 30,000 to more than 95,000, according to Audit Bureau of Circulations figures. Much of their circulation consists of single-copy sales rather than subscriptions. It continued its strong performance in the first quarter of 2010, with a 34% increase in circulation to 104,481, as compared to industry-wide 2.3% drop in sales. Circulation for their Sunday edition, Isolezwe ngeSonto, also reached 71,219. Paper insiders disagreed on the reasons for the growth; editor-in-chief Mbathi credited human-interest stories and local news, while joint managing director Brian Porter mentioned editorial content and sports as "vital ingredients".

== Language ==
Isozwele is known for using a more urban form of Zulu, in contrast to its competitor Ilanga, which describes itself as using a "purer form" of the language.

== Distribution areas ==
Distribution
	2008	2013
Eastern Cape		Y
Free State	Y	Y
Gauteng	Y	Y
Kwa-Zulu Natal	Y	Y
Limpopo		
Mpumalanga	Y	Y
North West	Y	
Northern Cape		
Western Cape		

== Distribution figures ==
Circulation
	Net Sales
Oct - Dec 2015	99 500
Jun - Aug 2015	104 510
Jan - Mar 2015	110 155
Jan - Mar 2014	119 846
Oct - Dec 2012	106 858
Jul - Sep 2012	107 628
Apr - Jun 2012	113 786
Jan - Mar 2012	117 266

== Readership figures ==
Estimated Readership
	AIR
Jan – Dec 2012	943 000
Jul 2011 – Jun 2012	867 000

== See also ==
- List of newspapers in South Africa
