= Belfast Telegraph =

Northern Irish newspaper

- Type: Daily newspaper (except Sundays)
- Format: Compact
- Owner: Mediahuis Ireland
- Founders: William Baird; George Baird
- Editor: Martin Breen
- Founded: 1870
- Political alignment: British unionism
- Language: English
- Headquarters: Belfast Telegraph House; 33 Clarendon Road; Belfast, Northern Ireland
- Sister newspapers: Sunday Life
- ISSN: 0307-5664
- OCLC number: 37380368
- Website: belfasttelegraph.co.uk

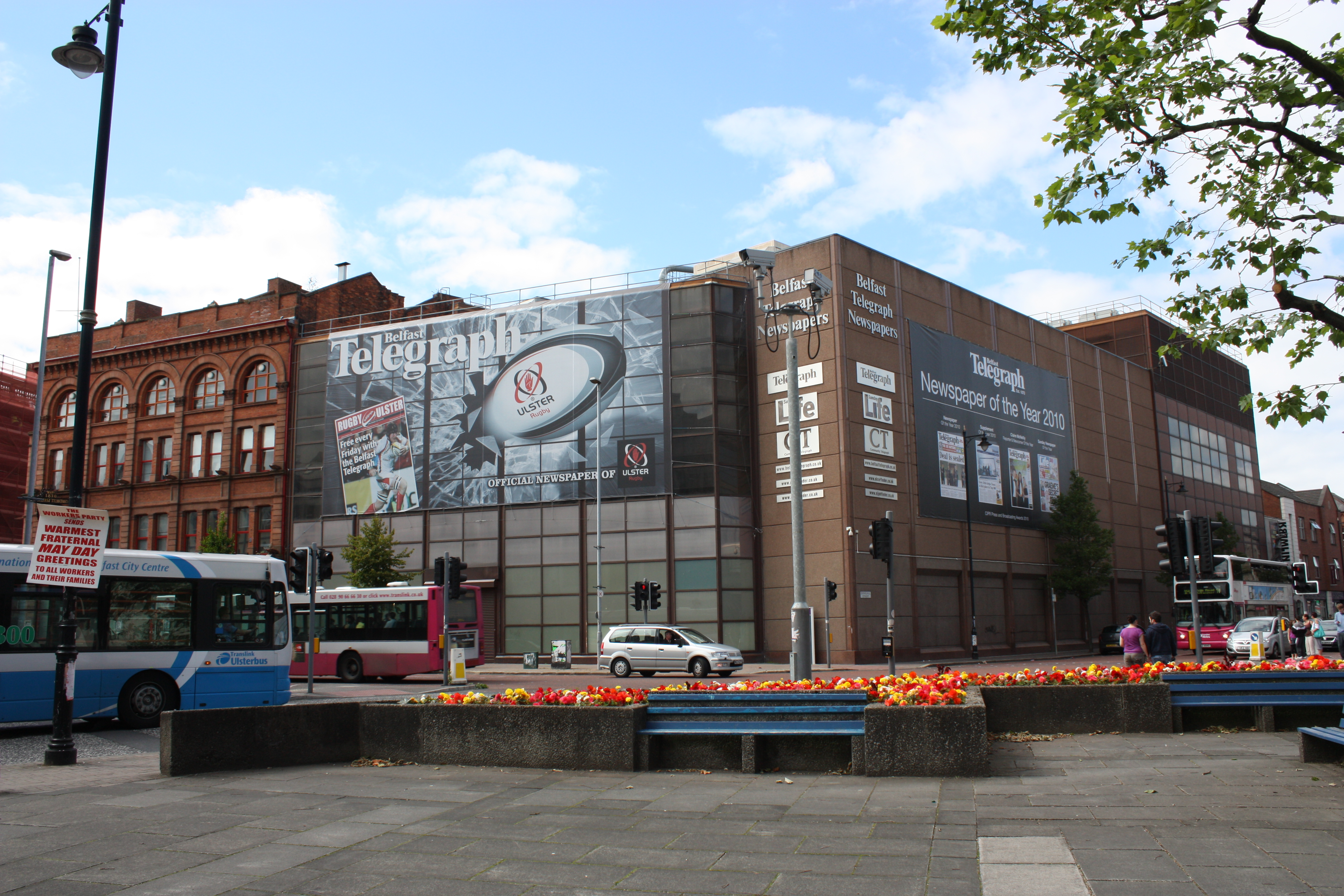
Former Belfast Telegraph offices, July 2010

The Belfast Telegraph is a daily newspaper published in Belfast, Northern Ireland. First published in 1870 as the Belfast Evening Telegraph, as of 2025, its editor-in-chief was Martin Breen.

Reflecting its unionist tradition, the paper has historically been "favoured by the Protestant population", while also being read within Catholic nationalist communities in Northern Ireland.

Owned by Independent News and Media (INM), a Dublin-based media company, from 2000, the INM group of newspapers was acquired by Mediahuis Ireland in 2019. Mediahuis Ireland also publishes the Irish Independent, the Sunday Independent and various other newspapers and magazines in Ireland.

In 2012, the newspaper moved to being exclusively a morning only publication and, as of 2024, no longer revealed circulation figures (sales figures), but rather releases the number of readers "reached" daily. In 2024, Mediahuis stated that the Belfast Telegraph was "reaching 143,311 readers" per day.

== History ==
The newspaper was first published as the Belfast Evening Telegraph on 1 September 1870 by brothers William and George Baird. Its first edition cost half a penny and ran to four pages covering the Franco-Prussian War and local news.

The evening edition of the newspaper was originally called the "Sixth Late", and "Sixth Late Tele" was a familiar cry made by vendors in Belfast city centre in the past. Local editions were published for distribution to Enniskillen, Dundalk, Newry, and Derry.

Its competitors are The News Letter and The Irish News, and local editions of London-based red tops also compete in this market, in some cases selling at a cheaper price than the "Tele".

Sometimes described as having "unionist leanings", and operating an editorial policy supportive of "moderate unionism", the Belfast Telegraph was bought by the Dublin-based Independent News & Media (INM) group in March 2000. It was INM's only print title outside of the Republic of Ireland.

The Belfast Telegraph was entirely broadsheet until 19 February 2005, when the Saturday morning edition was introduced and all Saturday editions were converted to compact. The weekday morning compact edition was launched on 22 March 2005.

In 2015, the newspaper launched the magazine supplement Family Life.

The INM group of newspapers, including the Belfast Telegraph, was acquired by Mediahuis Ireland (in turn owned by the Belgian company Mediahuis Partners NV) in 2019.

As of 2026, the paper was publishing two editions daily, Belfast Telegraph final edition and the North West Telegraph which is distributed in Derry.

== Awards ==
The Belfast Telegraph was named as Best UK Regional Newspaper of the Year 2012 by the Society of Editors Regional Press Awards.

== Circulation ==
Reflecting a decline in newspaper sales generally, circulation of the Belfast Telegraph has declined as of the early 21st century, from 109,571 for the period July to December 2002, to 31,340 for the same period in 2019.

Year (period)	Average circulation per issue
2002 (July to December)	109,571
2009 (January to June)	68,024
2010 (July to December)	58,491
2012 (January to June)	53,847
2013 (January to June)	49,228
2014 (July to December)	45,905
2015 (January to June)	44,141
2016 (January to June)	41,912
2017 (July to December)	36,403
2018 (July to December)	33,951
2019 (July to December)	31,340
