= I'solezwe lesiXhosa =

Xhosa language newspaper

- Type: Weekly newspaper
- Format: Tabloid
- Founded: 2015
- Language: Xhosa
- Website: isolezwelesixhosa.co.za

I'solezwe lesiXhosa is a Xhosa language newspaper launched in 2015.

== History ==
I'solezwe lesiXhosa became the country's only Xhosa newspaper when it was published on 30 March 2015, with the newspaper starting as a daily. It is now published weekly every Thursday and distributed in the Western Cape and Eastern Cape, predominantly Mthatha, East London, King William's Town and Port Elizabeth.

== Distribution figures ==
Circulation
| | Distribution |
|---|---|
| Aug 2016 | 33 000 |

== See also ==
- List of newspapers in South Africa
