= Titus Mafolo =

South African political strategist and businessman (born 1956)

- Born: Magashe Titus Mafolo; January 1956 (age 70); Sekhukhune, Northern Transvaal; Union of South Africa
- Political party: African National Congress

Magashe Titus Mafolo (born January 1956) was a South African politician, political strategist, businessman, and intellectual who was the chief political adviser to President Thabo Mbeki. Before that, he represented the African National Congress (ANC) in the National Assembly during the first democratic Parliament.

== Early life and career ==
Born in January 1956 in Sekhukhune, Mafolo grew up in Atteridgeville outside Pretoria. He trained as a journalist and was active in the anti-apartheid movement in the Pretoria region, including as a member of the executive of the United Democratic Front.

== Career in government ==
In South Africa's first post-apartheid elections in 1994, Mafolo was elected to represent the ANC in the National Assembly, where he chaired the Portfolio Committee on Housing. During the same period, he worked for the Institute for Democracy in South Africa. In 1998, he was recruited as a political adviser to Thabo Mbeki, then the Deputy President of South Africa and soon to become the President. In 1999, Mafolo followed Mbeki to the presidency, where he was chief presidential political adviser for the next nine years; he left with Mbeki in September 2008, when the ANC forced to Mbeki to resign.

The Mail & Guardian identified Mafolo as "a key figure in the presidency", linking him, among other things, to 2001 media reports that Cyril Ramaphosa, Tokyo Sexwale, and Mathews Phosa had spearheaded a political conspiracy against Mbeki in the run-up to the ANC's 51st National Conference. Mafolo also remained influential in the ANC's branch in Gauteng province, where he was viewed as a member of the "old guard", also including Amos Masondo and Kgalema Motlanthe, that was set against Mathole Motshekga's upstart faction.

=== Hijacking saga ===
On 4 January 2002, Mafolo was arrested in Pretoria and charged with fraud, perjury and defeating the ends of justice. The police, while remaining vague about the basis for the charges, said that "something was amiss" with a witness statement Mafolo had recently made. Mafolo had told the police that he was hijacked on 15 December 2001 by four armed men, who had taken his Mercedes Benz at gunpoint and had also stolen his cellphone, credit cards, clothes, and R2,000 in cash. The police said that, upon further investigation, they had found his account to be "full of inconsistencies". The strong implication, as reported by the media, was that Mafolo had lied about being hijacked, possibly in order to make a false insurance claim.

Mafolo was released on R3,000 bail and, while the trial was pending, said that he would sue Safety and Security Minister Steve Tshwete on the basis that a police investigator had released defamatory information about him. On 9 April, all charges against Mafolo were withdrawn. Mafolo said that he would proceed with his lawsuit and sue for wrongful arrest.

=== The Native Club ===
In 2006, Mafolo was a key figure in a scandal about an organisation called the Native Club, based in Pretoria at the Africa Institute of South Africa, partly funded by the Department of Arts and Culture, and peopled by prominent black intellectuals, including associates of President Mbeki. Mafolo was elected as the club's inaugural chairperson. The club's stated objective was to probe African identity and promote black heritage, but the name of the club led to questions about racial exclusionism.

Following inquiries from the opposition Democratic Alliance, Mbeki denied that he was behind the initiative, although his biographer, William Gumede, later concluded that the club had been established by his office.

=== Business interests ===
While serving as a presidential advisor, Mafolo attracted media attention for his interests in politically connected companies that were involved in prominent black economic empowerment (BEE) deals. He owned three per cent of Phatsima, whose holdings included 20 per cent of aircraft manufacturer Aerosud, and was a shareholder in Lereko, a BEE consortium that was led by former North West Premier Popo Molefe and that was involved in a controversial deal over shares in Sun International. In addition, he held a 25 per cent stake in Sondolo IT, a subsidiary of Bosasa Security, which was controversially awarded a large contract to provide surveillance services at South African prisons.

Most controversial, however, was Mafolo's stake in Koni Media Holdings. In November 2007, Koni Media launched a R7-billion bid to take over 100 per cent of Johnnic Communications (Johncom), the company that, with Allan Gray, owned the Sunday Times, South Africa's largest newspaper. In addition, the Sunday Times reported that Koni Media was in talks about funding the deal with assistance from the Public Investment Corporation, the state-owned asset manager. Because Koni Media's shareholders also included two other ANC-affiliated government officials, Ronnie Mamoepa and Billy Modise, there was wide speculation that Mbeki's government was involved in the takeover bid, a claim strongly denied by Koni Media. Mbeki himself was forced to respond, denying government involvement and saying that Mamoepa, Mafolo, and Modise owned only one per cent of Koni Media and did not have R1 million to spend on Johncom, let alone R7 billion. The deal did not go through.

== Later career and personal life ==
Since leaving the presidency, Mafolo has worked in political consulting and has published non-fiction books: Pheli – A Narrative History (2015), a community history of Atteridgeville, and the African Odyssey trilogy (2020), a history of Africa. He remains active in the ANC, and in 2019 he succeed Kgalema Motlanthe as the head of an internal ANC task team established to investigate allegations that ANC members were involved in the establishment of minor opposition parties, including the allegation that Ace Magashule and Jacob Zuma had helped found the African Transformation Movement.

He is married to Wilhelmina and has four children, three sons and one daughter.
