= Ireland's Own =

Weekly family magazine in Ireland

- Type: Weekly magazine
- Format: Magazine
- Owner: Independent News & Media
- Editor: Sean Nolan and Shea Tomkins
- Founded: 26 November 1902
- Headquarters: Wexford, Ireland
- Price: €1.60
- Website: irelandsown.ie

Ireland's Own is a general interest magazine published weekly in Ireland. Launched on 26 November 1902 by John M. Walshe of People Newspapers with an original cover price of 1d, it specialises in light-reading content, traditional stories, and uncontroversial family content, including puzzles and recipes.

== Original aim ==
The magazine was designed to challenge the appearance of British newspapers in Ireland like the News of the World (which were denounced as "scandal-sheets" that lowered the moral tone of late 19th century/early 20th century Ireland). The magazine's appearance coincided with a broad stressing of Irish identity as a reaction to British imports. Among the other examples were the creation of the Gaelic Athletic Association to promote Gaelic games and to halt the growth of soccer and rugby (1880s), the appearance of the Gaelic League to promote the Irish language (1893), and the growth in the Irish-Ireland movement reflected in the creation of the Abbey Theatre to promote Irish arts (1904) and the creation by Arthur Griffith in 1904 of Cumann na nGaedheal to protest at the visit of King George V and his queen, Mary of Teck.

Ireland's Own saw its role as projecting an image of Ireland free from "alien" influence, hence a content free from anything perceived as "scandalous" or "anti-Catholic". A critic described such magazines as offering "a formula for 'healthy fireside reading' combining patriotism, pietism and national news with a minimum of foreign coverage or intellectual speculation." The concept of such a magazine is traced back to the series of pietistic family magazines launched by James Duffy in the mid-19th century.

It was affected by the 1916 Easter Rising. The issue dated 24 May 1916 contained the following note for its readers: "Owing to the upheaval in Dublin we have been unable to distribute Ireland's Own as usual. Now that things are becoming more normal again, we are able to publish a limited number of copies this week. We expect to have everything running as before in a fortnight or so".

As of 2022, it was still printed on newsprint, rather than glossy material.

== Editor's description ==
A former editor, Phil Murphy, on the occasion of its centenary, described it with the words:

"Ireland's Own and contention are complete strangers to each other – and that would be a deliberate policy. It's not 'Dublin 4' (Note: "Dublin 4" is a trendy, upper-middle class liberal part of south Dublin. Dublin 4 is often used as a code word to describe "trendy liberals".) and trendy 'liberalism' and that aspect of Ireland, which is pretty shallow and skin deep anyway. We're slightly old-fashioned in our ways, for which we make no apologies. We attract a lot of our readership from people who probably have a yearning for what they consider to be the 'good old days, when things were better' as they see them. We do not take a hard-faced attitude towards our journalism or our magazine. We accept the fact that people do have a yearning for the old days, and nostalgia is a significant part of the magazine."

== Examples of content ==
Its Christmas 2003 edition contained a series of articles, both fact and fiction, on such topics as "Gathering the Holly", "Who is Father Christmas?", "The Christmas Fairy" and "Christmas Long Ago".

Kitty the Hare (A fictional old Irish travelling woman and storyteller who tells stories of the supernatural and bizarre) first appeared in 1924.

== Contributions ==
Ireland's Own accepts unsolicited contributions, both fiction and non-fiction. Copy may be submitted electronically. Payment is made for items accepted for publication, and contributors are sent a complimentary copy of the issue containing their item.

It has no journalists and it has no staff writers.

Shane MacGowan read a piece on the actor Patrick Bergin and then got to star in a Christmas edition himself, and stated afterwards: "Forget Hollywood, the best publicity I ever got was on the cover of Ireland's Own".

Maeve Binchy said it was like a "fairy godmother". John B. Keane's first publication was in Ireland's Own at the age of 13. Cathy Kelly and Mary Kenny have high regard for Ireland's Own. Colm Tóibín even deigned to write a little foreword for the 2022 annual, which features stories and bits and pieces of memory, though his opinion on the quality of Ireland's Own is unclear.

While at times derided as not terribly hip, and apart from Tóibín's foreword, there was a time when David Norris did a spread for it in 2022.

== Published in Wexford ==
In contrast to most Irish magazines, Ireland's Own is not Dublin-based but is edited in Wexford, where it has offices on the town's Main Street.

Ireland's Own celebrated its centenary in 2002.

It celebrated 120 years in publication in 2022. Sean Nolan and Shea Tomkins edited the magazine as it reached the big 120.

== Circulation ==
By the mid 1940s, Ireland's Own had an average circulation of approximately 28,000. This rose to approximately 70,000 in the 1970s and dropped to approximately 30,000 in the mid 2020s. The Christmas annual edition has a circulation of approximately 70,000 as of the mid 2020s.

== Ownership ==
The People Newspaper Group (which also included the Wicklow People, the Wexford People and the Waterford People) is now owned by Irish media giant Independent News and Media, now (Mediahuis Ireland).
