= Die Son =

Afrikaans language South African newspaper

- Type: Weekly newspaper
- Format: Tabloid
- Owner: Naspers
- Publisher: Naspers
- Language: Afrikaans
- Headquarters: Cape Town, Western Cape, South Africa
- Website: www.son.co.za

Die Son (Afrikaans: "The Sun") is a mixed Afrikaans-language South African tabloid reporting sensational news essentially after the model of British tabloids. It is the South African newspaper with the largest increase in readership in recent years. In the Western Cape province, it appears as a daily; in other provinces, it is a weekly paper. The editorial seat is in Cape Town.

The publishing house Naspers began to publish Die Son in 2003, after the large success of the English-language tabloid The Daily Sun in Western Cape, first under the title Kaapse Son ("Cape Sun"). The sales figures rose so rapidly that they decided in the same year to expand the sales to the whole of South Africa. In the first half-year (2005) the print run of the daily paper was estimated at 50 000; that on Fridays for the whole of South Africa averaged 220 000 copies. The other Afrikaans-language dailies (also from Naspers), like Die Burger, did not suffer from the dramatic growth of Die Son.

The English-language edition and the mixed Afrikaans edition share most of the content (both news and advertisement), except minor differences such as that the English does not have the Page 3 girl feature.

== Distribution areas ==
Distribution
	2019
Eastern Cape	
Free State	
Gauteng	
Kwa-Zulu Natal	
Limpopo	
Mpumalanga	
North West	
Northern Cape	Y
Western Cape	Y

== Distribution figures ==
Circulation
	Net Sales
Jan – Mar 2015	82 579
Jan – Mar 2014	84 870
Oct – Dec 2012	96 598
Jul – Sep 2012	94 610
Apr – Jun 2012	100 331
Jan – Mar 2012	104 696

== Readership figures ==
Estimated Readership
	AIR
Jan – Dec 2012	1 102 000
Jul 2011 – Jun 2012	1 058 000

== See also ==
- List of newspapers in South Africa
- Daily Voice, a similar newspaper, also based in Cape Town
