= Mediahuis Ireland =

Irish media organisation

- Type: Private limited company
- Industry: Media
- Founded: 1904; 122 years ago in Dublin, Ireland
- Founder: William Martin Murphy
- Headquarters: Dublin, Ireland
- Key people: Marc Vangeel (CEO)
- Products: Newspapers, magazines, distribution, printing and online media.
- Revenue: €191 million (2018)
- Owner: Mediahuis
- Number of employees: 825 (2018)
- Website: www.mediahuis.ie

Mediahuis Ireland (formerly Independent News and Media, or INM) is a media organisation based in Dublin and publishes national daily newspapers, Sunday newspapers, regional newspapers and operates multiple websites including Independent.ie. Mediahuis Ireland is owned by its Belgian parent company Mediahuis, and operates throughout Ireland. Its titles include the highest circulation daily and Sunday papers in Ireland. Mediahuis Ireland is a wholly owned subsidiary of Mediahuis.

The INM group of companies was dominated by Tony O'Reilly and his family between 1973 and 2012. Thereafter, Denis O'Brien was the largest shareholder in Independent News & Media until April 2019.

== History ==
=== Early history ===
The company was formed as Independent Newspapers Limited in 1904 by William Martin Murphy, as the publisher of the Irish Independent.

=== The O'Reilly years ===
In 1973, (Sir) Tony O'Reilly acquired 100% of the "A" shares of the company from the Murphy and Chance families, and was later forced to bid for the "B" (non-voting) shares. The company was subsequently floated on the Irish Stock Exchange and London Stock Exchange. The group expanded overseas, acquiring interests in the UK, Australia, New Zealand, and South Africa.

In 1999, the company name was changed to Independent News and Media plc.

O'Reilly was CEO until early 2009; one of his sons, formerly COO, Gavin O'Reilly, became CEO in early 2009, and two others were non-executive directors for many years. O'Reilly himself resigned as CEO on 19 April 2012 and was replaced by Vincent Crowley. O'Reilly had come under pressure in recent months from two of INM's largest shareholders, billionaire Denis O'Brien and financier Dermot Desmond.

=== The O'Brien and Desmond years ===
In May 2012, Irish entrepreneur Denis O'Brien held a 29.9% stake in the company, making him the largest shareholder at the time. This compares to O'Reilly's family stake of around 13% (June 2012). Five per cent of the holding company was held by Clear Channel Communications, transferred in return for control of a South African outdoor advertising firm.

On 26 April 2013, INM announced it had concluded a deal with its bankers to exchange part of its debt for up to 20 per cent of equity. The deal was subject to the sale of its South African newspapers, a reduction in staff levels of 10%, a capital raising, and the restructuring of the company's pension plan.

=== 2019 change of ownership ===
In 2019, it was reported that INM was up for sale. According to reports, suitors include Schibsted, Sanoma Media and a private equity firm.

In April 2019, it was reported that INM had accepted an ownership bid of €145.6 million from Belgian media group Mediahuis. The offer was subject to acceptance by shareholders at an EGM, competition authority approval and government approval.

In May 2019, Mediahuis increased its stake to 29.9%.

An EGM held on 26 June 2019 approved the Mediahuis offer.

On 10 June 2019, the CCPC, which is the Irish competition authority, approved the acquisition.

On 28 June 2019, the acquisition received approval of shareholders. The acquisition was then subject to the approval of the Minister for Communications and the sanction of the High Court, as it was executed by way of a scheme of arrangement.

On 16 July 2019, it was announced that the court hearing would be on 30 July 2019.

On 29 July 2019, Richard Bruton, the Minister for Communications, "unconditionally" cleared the proposed deal.

On 30 July 2019, court approval was received for the deal. Trading of INM shares on Euronext Dublin (formerly the Irish Stock Exchange) and the London Stock Exchange was suspended, with the cancellation of shares taking effect on 1 August. INM was then re-registered as a private limited company. The process to buy up all of INM's outstanding shares from around 7,000 shareholders took place until the end of August 2019.

=== Mediahuis ownership (September 2019 – present) ===
In October 2019, it was reported that INM were closing their CityWest print plant.

In November 2019, it was announced that Mediahuis plans to transfer €60m to Belgian parent from INM.

In July 2020, it was reported that INM had acquired motor data company Cartell.ie.

In July 2020, it was announced that Independent News & Media had reached an agreement to sell their 50% stake in Independent Star to Reach plc. The agreement was subject to competition authority approval and was cleared by CCPC, the Irish competition authority and the Minister for Communications on 20 November 2020. The deal became effective in December 2020.

In March 2023, a redundancy programme was announced.

In April 2023, Mediahuis CEO said that daily newspapers would disappear within the next decade.

== Current assets ==
=== Ireland: National newspapers ===
- The Herald
- Irish Independent
- Sunday Independent
- Sunday World

=== Ireland (incl Northern Ireland, UK): Regional newspapers ===
- The Kerryman
- Drogheda Independent
- The Sligo Champion
- Wicklow People
- Wexford People
- Belfast Telegraph
- Sunday Life
- The Argus
- New Ross Standard
- The Corkman
- Enniscorthy Guardian, also known as The Guardian

=== Ireland: Magazines ===
- Ireland's Own

=== Ireland (incl Northern Ireland, UK): Websites operated ===
- Independent.ie
- CarsIreland.ie
- NIcarfinder
- ClickAndGo
- PropertyNews.com
- NIjobfinder
- RecruitNI
- Farm Ireland
- Cartell.ie
- Carzone

=== Ireland: Distribution and delivery ===
- NewsSpread
- Reach Home Delivery

== Former assets ==
=== Ireland ===
In 1993, the group bought into the now defunct Sunday Tribune, in which it owned 98% of the issued share capital and over which it has considerable influence. As INM technically only held 29.9% of voting shares and so lacked management control, it did not consolidate the results of the Tribune, which was loss-making, with accumulated losses of around €45 million since acquisition. The Tribune went into administration and closed in February 2011.

The group launched Independent Colleges, which has its base on Dublin's Dawson Street, in 2007, and sold its education division in 2014.

The Irish Daily Star, formerly 50% owned by INM, was sold to Reach plc, parent of the Daily Star in the UK, in 2020.

The Kingdom, based in Kerry ceased publication in January 2011.

In 2022, the Fingal Independent was closed.

=== United Kingdom ===
The Independent (of London) was bought for around €100 million in 1997, and up until March 2010, the title had made cumulative losses of at least €150 million. The Independent and the Independent on Sunday newspapers were sold to a company controlled by Alexander Lebedev in March 2010.

During 2007, INM opened a new full-colour Goss printing press facility in Newry, County Down. The press, the Goss Flexible Printing System known as the FPS, was the first FPS sold by Goss Preston.

- Ireland's Saturday Night (closed in 2008)

=== South Africa ===
Until 2013, the group was the second biggest newspaper publisher in South Africa, owning 14 newspapers including The Star and Pretoria News in Gauteng, the Daily Voice, Cape Times, Cape Argus and Weekend Argus in Cape Town, The Mercury, Post, Isolezwe, Daily News, Sunday Tribune and Independent on Saturday in Durban, the Diamond Fields Advertiser in Kimberley, as well as the national Sunday Independent and 13 community newspapers in Cape Town. The group's titles account for 48% of the total advertising spend in paid newspapers, 22% of all newspapers sold in the country, and 63% of the English language market.

In mid-2012, speculation began that INM would sell their South African operation. This was later confirmed. INM had initially hoped for 250 million EUR for INM SA, however, bids came in at around 150 million EUR. Cape Town businessman Iqbal Surve's Sekunjalo Investments consortium were the frontrunners to purchase INM SA. Initially Sekunjalo was set to take a 75% stake in the consortium, but this was changed to 55%, with the remainder going to two government entities. The first of these is the investment arm of the SA government, and the second is an investment arm of the Chinese government. Commenting on the deal University of the Witwatersrand journalism professor Anton Harber said that "the ANC is working with their Chinese allies—ruling party to ruling party, in the way the Chinese government so often works—to increase their influence in our local media and counter what they view as a hostile media sector."

Bloomberg reported that Denis O'Brien met Jacob Zuma, president of South Africa, during a private meeting at the hotel on 24 January 2013. He also met the broker negotiating the sale of INM SA.

=== Australia and New Zealand ===
The company owned a stake in APN News & Media Limited, a large newspaper publisher in Australia and New Zealand, which owns The New Zealand Herald and other newspapers, and is listed on the Australian Securities Exchange.

On 12 February 2007, INM announced that the board of APN had recommended an all-cash revised offer of A$6.10 per share for the entire issued share capital of APN. The subsequent bid to take APN News & Media Ltd private in May 2007 was unsuccessful.

INL owned approximately 30% of APN at mid-2012 and sold it by March 2015.

=== India ===
INM previously entered into the Indian market, purchasing 20% of Dainik Jagran, the publishing company behind India's best-selling paper. This market has been identified by INM as being a key element of its move into non-English speaking media markets with huge growth opportunities and potential for advancement. Since the initial investment, INM deepened its involvement by buying 20% of the radio business of Dainik Jagran. The intention is to establish eight radio stations in the so-called "Hindi Belt".

In August 2010, INM sold its entire stake in Dainik Jagran. INM no longer have any Indian interests.

=== Other interests ===
INM also held stakes in the Unison ISP and the iTouch electronic payments and premium-rate telecoms operator, with the controlling stake in the latter sold to a Japanese firm.

==== Cable ====
The company formerly held a 50% stake in Chorus Communications, the second largest cable television and MMDS operator in Ireland, having acquired this with a merger between Cable Management Ireland and their own Irish Multichannel. However, this was sold in 2004.

== The group ==
The chief executive is Marc Vangeel having succeeded Michael Doorly in the role on 1 August 2019. The chairman is Murdoch MacLennan. The group website is inm.ie.

== Controversies ==
There have been questions about the policy of not consolidating the 98%-owned but loss-making Sunday Tribune, and on the other hand, the practice of consolidating entirely the massively profitable APN News & Media, which was less than 41%-owned. In the half-year to June 2007, for example, the group reported operating profits of €155 million—but this excluded €1.5 million of losses from the Tribune, and included €85 million from APN (whereas a proportionate share of profit would have been, at that time, €32 million).

There have also been questions about APN, which was acquired in transactions involving both the group and the O'Reilly family, and profited the latter greatly, and about the massive level of group debt (over €1.3 billion). Furthermore, there have been complaints about the level of power of the O'Reilly family, the independence or otherwise of the board, and about the costs of O'Reilly as CEO, with second-largest shareholder Denis O'Brien and others having noted travel costs from O'Reilly's primary home in the Bahamas, company payments towards his now second home in Kilcullen, near Dublin, on top of large salary and other contributions.

The groups' failure to cover the controversy surrounding INM director Brian Mulroney has also been criticised. Mulroney was the subject of an inquiry by the Canadian Privy Council because of his part in a scandal involving the purchase of Airbus by Air Canada, and also his relationship to German arms dealer Karlheinz Schreiber.

The group's relationship with a variety of entertainment and public relationships firms via Clear Channel Independent has also been seen as problematic.

Independent News and Media was identified by the National Union of Journalists (NUJ) as an employer where "bullying" and "lack of support" were rampant. The survey said 93% of the respondents claimed they didn't receive proper support from the management, and 20% of them complained of bullying at work. The survey also claimed 96% of the respondents complained that they had to work overtime, and 55% of them said they were forced to do so. INM declined to comment on the survey.

== See also ==
- List of Irish companies
