= Daily Sun (South Africa) =

South African newspaper

- Type: Daily newspaper
- Format: Print and Online
- Owner: Media24
- Founder: Deon du Plessis
- Publisher: Media24
- Editor-in-chief: Amos Mananyetso
- Founded: July 2002
- Language: English
- Headquarters: Johannesburg, Gauteng, South Africa
- Sister newspapers: Sunday Sun
- Website: www.snl24.com/dailysun

The Daily Sun is a tabloid daily newspaper in South Africa. It had a circulation of more than 28,006 copies making it the second largest daily newspaper in the country to the Sunday Times in terms of largest circulation among all papers.

Daily Sun is based in Randburg, Johannesburg. It targets readers in and around the major urban centres. These readers are predominantly black, English-literate with high-school or further education, and working-class earners – the economic core of South Africa.

Daily Sun has also transitioned to digital, with a monthly pageview count of 4.7 million and an active user base of 3 million in 2023. The last print edition was published on Friday 20 December 2024. It is still available online.

In 2024, Daily Sun received a nomination for "Most Informative Online Publication" at the Behind the Scenes Awards (BTSA). Other nominees in the same category included Zimoja Lezinto, Sunday World, Isolezwe, MDNtv, and Times Live. The Behind the Scenes Awards celebrate excellence in various media and entertainment fields within South Africa.

== History ==
The Daily Sun was launched on 1 July 2002 by Media24, a division of the Naspers group. It was the brainchild of veteran journalist, Deon du Plessis, who remained its publisher and minority shareholder until 11 September 2011, when he died suddenly at his Johannesburg home. The newspaper has been overseen by editor Amos Mananyetso since 2022.

In June 2024, Moneyweb reported the newspaper would cease print in October. Media24 declined to comment. A month later Media24 announced it will suspend the planned closure until the Competition Commission approves of its plan to sell newspaper distribution company On-The-Dot to Novus, which was the reason behind the paper's planned shuttering.

== Distribution areas ==
Distribution
	2008	2013
Eastern Cape	Y	Y
Free State	Y	Y
Gauteng	Y	Y
Kwa-Zulu Natal	Y	Y
Limpopo	Y	Y
Mpumalanga	Y	Y
North West	Y	Y
Northern Cape	Y	Y
Western Cape	Y	Y

== Distribution figures ==
Circulation
	Net Sales
Jan – Mar 2015	265 993
Jan – Mar 2014	283 216
Oct – Dec 2012	322 324
Jul – Sep 2012	336 319
Apr – Jun 2012	348 265
Jan – Mar 2012	375 185

== Readership figures ==
Estimated Readership
	AIR
Jan 2012 – Dec 2012	5 554 000
Jul 2011 – Jun 2012	5 669 000

== See also ==
- List of newspapers in South Africa
