= Volksblad =

Newspaper

- Type: Daily newspaper
- Owner: Media24
- Founded: 1904
- Ceased publication: 2020 (print)
- Website: www.volksblad.com

The Volksblad (English: People's Journal) is an Afrikaans-language online newspaper based in Bloemfontein, South Africa. The paper was distributed in the Free State and Northern Cape provinces, where it was the largest Afrikaans daily. It was South Africa's oldest Afrikaans newspaper until printing ceased in 2020. The paper was owned by Media24. It is now available on Netwerk24.

== History ==
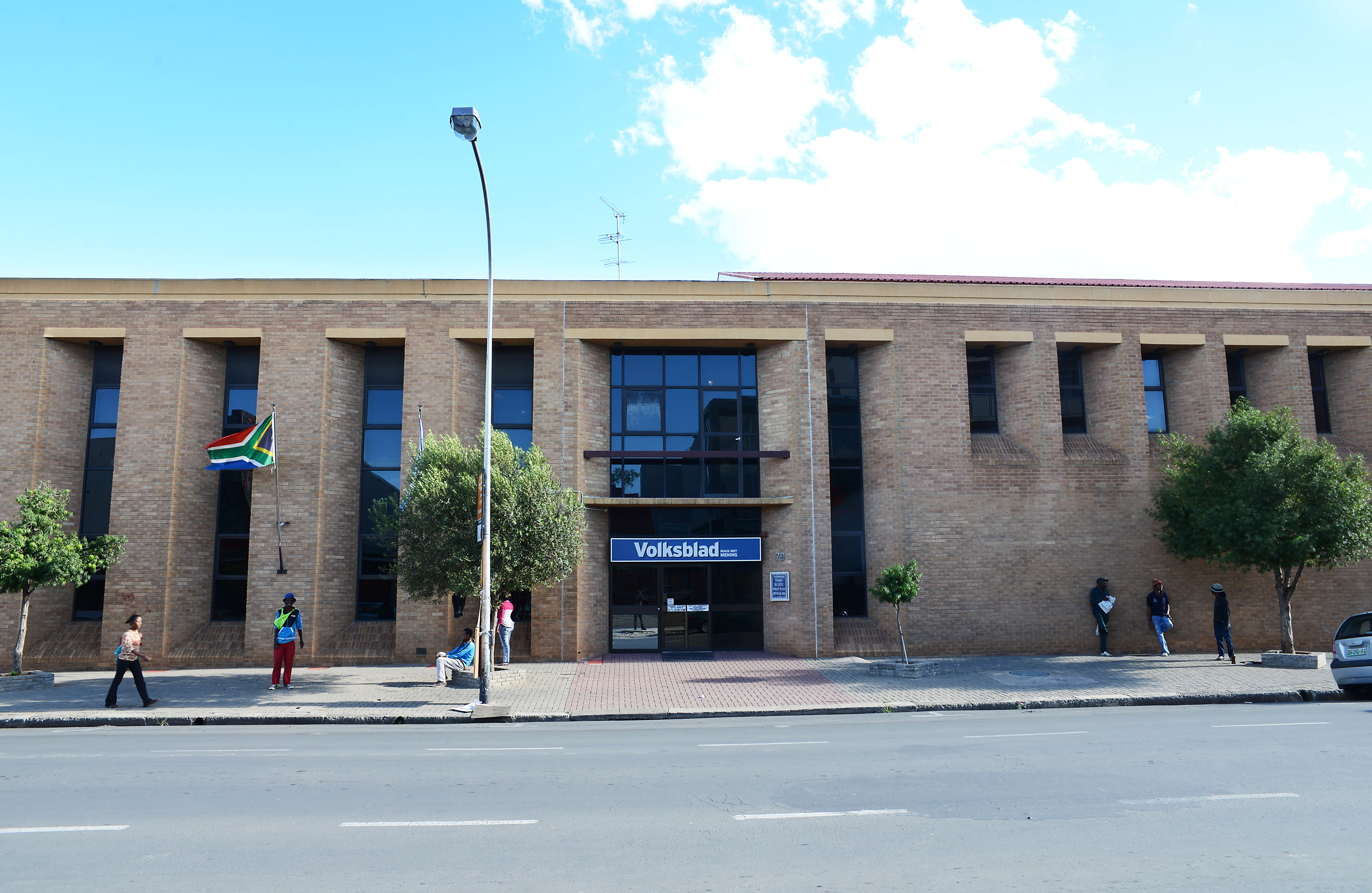
The Volksblad office at 79 Nelson Mandela Avenue, Bloemfontein.

VOLKSBLAD, the oldest Afrikaans daily newspaper in South Africa, made its first appearance on 18 November 1904 in Potchefstroom in the form of Het Westen, a Dutch weekly with four pages with Hendrik de Graaf as the founder owner.

The paper devoted itself to the interests and development of the Afrikaner people of the former independent Orange Free State and Transvaal Republics in the aftermath of the Second Anglo-Boer War (1899–1902).

Het Westen changed its name to Het Volksblad on 26 March 1915, because it was no longer a regional newspaper for the then Western Transvaal, but rather a fully-fledged newspaper for the "nation" or volk.

The next year its head office moves to Bloemfontein after general De Wet and other Free State rebellion leaders asked De Graaf to move his newspaper to the Free State, the heart of Afrikaner Nationalism.

On 15 September 1917 the Nasionale Pers bought Het Volksblad for £16 000 and on 20 November of the same year its name was changed to Die Volksblad. On 2 October 1925 Die Volksblad became a daily newspaper. It was a morning newspaper until 29 July 1933 when it became an afternoon paper for nearly six decades.

By 1948 it was a strong, profitable newspaper with a wide distribution area and influence in the Free State, parts of the former Cape Province and Transvaal.

In mid 1973 Die Volksblad posted its best circulation figure to date with a weekday circulation of 41 050 and a Saturday figure of 35 485.

In 1974 Nasionale Pers started a new newspaper in Johannesburg, Beeld. Die Volksblad suffered circulation losses to Beeld in the Northern Free State and Western Transvaal.

Other landmark dates are 24 February 1983 when Die Volksblad appeared for the first time in full colour, and on 4 March 1991 it became a morning newspaper.

Highlights for the newspaper in the early nineties was winning the prestigious national McCall Trophy for typographical excellence two years in a row, 1993 and 1994. (Volksblad also won this award in 2010, 2011, 2012 and 2013).

On 20 April 2001 the "Die" disappeared officially from the name and the newspaper became known as Volksblad.

In 2004 Volksblad celebrated its centenary, with among other things, the publication of the book 'n Lewe van sy eie – die biografie van Volksblad.

The editors through the years were the people that led the newspapers with distinction: Hendrik de Graaf (stigter-eienaar, 1904 – 1917); Paul G. Das (1904 – 1905); Adam Boshoff (1905 – 1907); B.G. Versélewel de Witt Hamer (1907 – 1909); D.P. du Toit (1909 – 1914); J. H. Malan (1914 – 1916); dr. H.G. Viljoen (1916); dr. J.F.W. Grosskopf (1917 – 1919); J.H. Malan (waarnemende redakteur, 1919 – 1921); dr. J.G. Conradie (1921), dr. Reinard G. Kottich (1921 – 1922); A.J. Werth (1922 – 1925); dr. A.J.R. van Rhijn (1925 – 1948); dr. Otto du Plessis (1948); Hubert Coetzee (1949 – 1957); Hugo Dreyer (1958 – 1970); dr. Bart Zaaiman (1970 – 1980); Hennie van Deventer (1980 – 1992); Johan de Wet (1992 – 1994); Paul Marais (1994 – 1999); Jonathan Crowther (1999 – 2009), Ainsley Moos ( 2010 – 2012), Johanna van Eeden (2012- ).

On 7 July 2020, Media24 announced that the printed paper version will be discontinued on 8 August 2020. This radical step was directly caused by the economic effect of Coronavirus on business activity and reduced spending on advertisements in the printed media. Dapper efforts to keep Volksblad afloat during the two years preceding its downfall finally gave way as a casualty of the COVID-19 pandemic.

== Distribution areas ==
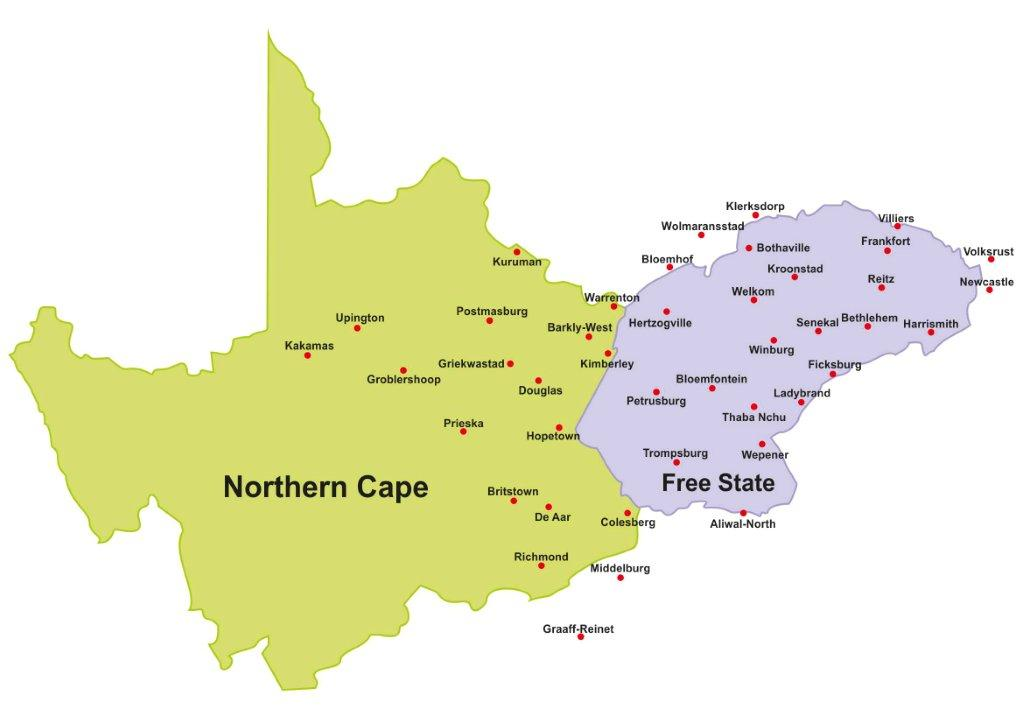

== Distribution figures ==
Circulation
	Net Sales
Jan – Mar 2015	18 652
Jan – Mar 2014	20 590
Jan – Mar 2013	21 881
Apr – Jun 2013	20 058
Jul – Sept 2013	20 468
Oct – Dec 2013	20 458

== Readership figures ==
Estimated Readership
	AIR
Jan – Jun 2013	126 000
Jan – Dec 2012	155 000

== Projects ==
Volksblad is involved with a number of projects.

The Volksblad-Kersfonds is a fundraising project which raises funds for less fortunate people in the newspaper's readership area. Around R1 million is raised annually through this initiative which is distributed to around 60 NGO's in the Free State and Northern Cape. Donations for this fund can be deposited into its bank account: Volksblad-Kersfonds, Nedbank Current Account 102 891 9980, branch code 117 134. Send a fax a proof of payment to Marie McLaren at 051-448-3771.

The Matriculant of the Year is a competition which is held annually in partnership with the University of the Free State. The 42nd rendition of the competition was held in 2023. The aim of the competition is to reward versatile achievers and to encourage them to pursue their tertiary studies in Bloemfontein. Points are awarded for academic achievements, as well as achievements in the fields of leadership, sport and culture. The finalists get treated to a weekend in Bloemfontein during which judging takes place and the winner is announced. Prices of around R800 000 is awarded to the top 25, which include bursaries and an overseas trip for the winner. Other sponsors include Astra XL Travels, Kovsie- Alumni Trust, Absa, SA Truck Bodies, Lindsay Saker Volkswagen, KPMG and Vodacom.

Dink-of-sink is another project that Volksblad hosts annually in partnership with AfriForum and Hoër Meisieskool Oranje in Bloemfontein. Dink-of-sink is a debating contest for high school learners that teaches them to think on their feet. Cash prizes are up for grabs and Afrikaans celebrities are normally used as judges.

The Vryfees is another project which Volksblad is associated with. This arts festival is held annually during the June/July holidays on the campus of the University of the Free State in Bloemfontein. This festival was formerly known as the Volksblad-kunstefees.

Spel-en-speel is a project which Volksblad launched in 2014. This spelling bee for primary school learners in Bloemfontein took place for the first time on 13 March in partnership with Eduplus Independent School, AfriForum and the Free State Department of Education.

Volksblad also presents the Volksblad-Roosknoppie competition annually in partnership with the Loch Logan Waterfront in Bloemfontein to coincide with the Rose Festival. The competition is open to 3 and 4-year-old girls who are reminiscent of a rose bud. The photos of the finalists are published in Volksblad after which a round of voting takes place. The 30 finalists then appear before a judging panel after which the winners are announced.

To view a selection of Volksblad videos, go to Volksblad's YouTube Channel: https://www.youtube.com/user/VolksbladNuus.

== Regular Columnists ==
Annelie Botes, who is one of the Goeiemôre columnists, was born on a farm in the Kammanassie near Uniondale in the winter of 1957. She started and finished her school years in the Uniondale Secondary School. The year after she wrote matric she and the "Gryse" were married in the sandstone church in Uniondale. Her actual job is a piano teacher, but you can't tell her anything about blackjack and roulette as well. Besides mountain climbing and bungee jumping there is nothing holding her back. "Then I am only a housewife who peels potatoes and pushes the vacuum cleaner". And she wrote 12 books.

Gert Coetzee, Brandpunt columnist of Volksblad, has been a Volksblad journalist in Bloemfontein, Kimberley, London, Cape Town (as political reporter in parliament), and in Stellenbosch (teaching journalists at the University of Stellenbosch as Rykie van Reenen associate). He specialises as an in-depth writer, political reporter and columnist. As an assistant editor of Volksblad he is in charge of the main editorial page and acts as ombud. He received a BA, BA Hons (English) and MA in Creative Writing (cum laude) from the University of the Free State. He is also an award-winning writer of short stories and poems.

Charles Smith, who makes sure to put a kink in the news every Thursday in the Goeiemôre column, is news editor of Volksblad/Afrikaans News: Central. He was born and bred on a farm in the Free State and works at Volksblad for the past 25 years. He was in matric at the Rouxville Secondary School and had on the job training at Volksblad. He believes a column writer must try to use all his senses like weapons and thereby give Afrikaans oxygen.

Hennie van Coller, one of the columnists of Goeiemôre, is professor and head of the Department of Afrikaans, Dutch, German and French at the University of the Free State in Bloemfontein. He is also amongst others editor of Perspektief en Profiel about the history of Afrikaans literature, a prizewinning literary scientist, translator and poet.

== Central Local Newspapers ==
The Volksblad Group also has 12 central local newspapers which serve the needs of local communities across the Free State and Northern Cape.

Bloemnews, the oldest bilingual community newspaper in Bloemfontein, is a weekly community newspaper distributed free of charge every Friday to households in Bloemfontein and 20 surrounding towns in the Free State and Northern Cape. With 42 000 copies every Friday Bloemnews offers you blanket coverage of Bloemfontein. Bloemnews is a quality community newspaper with specific focus on local news relevant to Bloemfontein.

Express Eastern Free State is a free English community newspaper which is distributed weekly on Thursdays in: QwaQwa, Bethlehem, Kestell, Lyttelton, Phofung, Phuthadithaba, Harrismith, Lesotho Grenspos, Fouriesburg, Clarens, Ladybrand, Reitz and Ficksburg. The editorial content is strong, gripping and diverse. More than 145 000 readers read the newspaper every week.

Express Northern Cape is a free English community newspaper which is distributed on Wednesdays in Kimberley, Kuruman, Mothibistad, Kathu, Warrenton, Barkly Wes, Hartswater, Jan Kempdorp, De Aar, Petrusville, Douglas, Prieska, Hopetown, Van der Kloof and Postmasburg. It focuses on the English-speaking market with high quality local news. More than 61 000 readers read the paper every week.

Kroonnuus is a free Afrikaans and English community newspaper which is distributed weekly on Tuesdays in Kroonstad, Heilbron, Steynsrus, Koppies, Viljoenskroon, Edenville and Bothaville. It covers local news, sports, business, jobs, and community events. Kroonnuus has 45 000 readers weekly.

Maluti is a free Afrikaans and English community newspaper which is distributed from home to home in Bethlehem on Wednesdays and is delivered at agents in Reitz, Senekal, and Kestell. The newspaper is 22 years old and has 13 100 readers weekly.

Vista is a free Afrikaans and English community newspaper which is distributed on Thursdays in Welkom, Virginia, Odendaalsrus, Riebeeckstad, Allanridge, Bronville, Hennenman, Theunissen, Bothaville, Hoopstad, Bultfontein, Ventersburg, Winburg, Wesselsbron, Thabong, Kutlwanong, Meloding and Phomolong every week. Vista has serviced the entire Goldfields community in Afrikaans and English for the last 42 years and consists of a hard and soft news approach. Vista has a readership of 145 000 readers.

Vrystaat is the only local newspaper in the Volksblad Group that is sold to the public. Vrystaat is an Afrikaans and English regional newspaper which is distributed in the Eastern Free State every Thursday. Distribution takes place in the following areas: Bethlehem, Lindley, Warden, Vrede, Clarens, Kestell, Harrismith, Reitz, Frankfort, Tweeling, Petrus Steyn, Arlington, Paul Roux, Rosendal, Ficksburg, Slabberts, Fouriesburg, Ladybrand, Excelsior, Tweespruit, Senekal, Excelsior, Slabberts, Tweespruit en Phuthaditjhaba. The community actively participates by means of a weekly letters column. The newspaper carries strong regional news and is read by 28 000 readers.

== See also ==
- List of newspapers in South Africa
