= Ziwaphi =

Investigative and general interest newspaper in South Africa

- Type: Newspaper, online,
- Format: Tabloid, online
- Owner: Uxhumano Communications
- Publisher: Tom Nkosi
- Founded: 2007
- Headquarters: Mbombela, Mpumalanga, South Africa
- Circulation: 4,000
- Price: R1.50
- Website: www.ziwaphi.com

Ziwaphi is an investigative and a general interest, biweekly, tabloid-size newspaper, with an estimated 40,000 readers. It was started with funding from the Media Development and Diversity Agency (MDDA). The MDDA is an agency that was established by the South African government to redress the exclusion and marginalisation of victims of apartheid policies from access to the media and the media industry, media ownership and control.

The name Ziwaphi is a colloquial Nguni expression, which means "What’s Happening and Where?" – these are two of the five most important questions when gathering news in journalism. The newspaper is the brainchild of Tom Nkosi, a public relations graduate from the University of South Africa who also received his journalism training at the Singapore Press Holdings.

Ziwaphi is based in Mbombela, the capital city of Mpumalanga Province, one of South Africa's nine provinces. It specialises in local and regional news coverage, but also offers a broad range provincial and national news. Along with news, lifestyle, sports, and commentary, the newspaper also features a full complement of display and classified advertising.

The content of the newspaper is generated by a team of experienced journalists, volunteers, high-profile commentators and specialists on a variety of subjects, such as gender issues; HIV and AIDS; economy; law and politics. It is published by Uxhumano Communications and carries articles by various commentators, news-makers, political and economic analysts, as well as in-depth interviews with influential individuals, leaders and policy makers.

The first edition hit the streets on 13 April 2007, and ever since, the publication is growing strong with an estimated 8,000 editions printed every month. The newspaper is accredited by the Audit Bureau of Circulations of South Africa. It is distributed every second Friday of the month in the three municipalities, Mbombela, Nkomazi and Umjindi in the Ehlanzeni District of Mpumalaga Province.

The newspaper is a member of the Association of Independent Publishers (AIP), southern Africa's largest umbrella body for independent grassroots and advocacy publications.

== Awards ==
- 2012: Best Front Page – Independent – MDDA SANLAM Community Media awards (2013)
- 2014: Finalist African Story Challenge
