= Diamond Fields Advertiser =

Daily newspaper published in South Africa

DFA
- Type: Daily newspaper
- Format: Tabloid
- Owner: Independent Media
- Editor: Johan du Plessis
- Headquarters: Kimberley
- Website: www.dfa.co.za

The Diamond Fields Advertiser (DFA) is a daily newspaper published in Kimberley, South Africa, founded on 23 March 1878.

== The early days ==
The earliest paper on the Diamond Fields was a weekly called the Diamond Field, published from 15 October 1870 at Pniel. It moved the following year first to Du Toit's Pan and then New Rush (later renamed Kimberley), and had a strongly anti-imperial view point. Another of the early papers was the pro-British Diamond News of R. W. Murray.

The Independent, owned by William Ling in 1876, was acquired by J. B. Robinson. By the late 1870s the success of the Independent had forced the Diamond Field to close, but with the Diamond Fields Advertiser then emerging as a third paper alongside the Diamond News and the Independent keeping local politicians on their toes in the turbulent years that followed.

During the Siege of Kimberley, the newspaper was the subject of a feud between Cecil Rhodes and garrison commander, Colonel Robert Kekewich. The local newspaper, which was under Rhodes' control, ignored the military censor and printed information that compromised the military. Kekewich obtained permission from his superior to place Rhodes under arrest if necessary.

Prominent journalists in Kimberley in the early years included R. W. Murray, and F. Y. St Leger, later founder of the Cape Times.

== Editors of the DFA ==
1878 – 1884 Henry Tucker, secretary of the Kimberley mining board and one time Member of the Cape Parliament. 1884 – 1896 Robert Fisher Wilson, independent spirit and fearless writer. Went on to become editor of the Johannesburg Times. 1896 – 1898 Albert Cartwright. Went on to edit the SA News and the Johannesburg Times. 1898 – 1910 George AL Green, Rhodes's 'Prince of Journalists'. Went on to edit the Cape Argus. 1910 – 1923 Frank Ireland 1923 – 1932 Henry Lissant Collins 1932 – 1938 George A Simpson. Was one of Sol Plaatje's pallbearers at his funeral at the West End cemetery.

1938 – 1939 Hastings H Beck 1939 – 1942 A Harrington 1942 – 1949 Rex Hall. Later helped to establish South Africa's Iron and Steel Corporation. 1949 – 1959 David Brechin 1959 – 1962 Archie Atkinson 1962 – 1967 Conrad Lighton 1967 – 1977 Mike Lloyd 1977 – 1984 Graham Etherington 1985 – 1991 Anthony Ball 1991 – 1992 Charles Guild (acting) 1992 – 2002 Kevin Ritchie 2002 – present Johan du Plessis

== DFA today ==
The Diamond Fields Advertiser, affectionately known to its readers as the DFA, outlived its rivals and has continued as a daily paper (although the Saturday edition was dropped in the late 1960s). Today it is a member of Independent News & Media.

Readership stood at 108,000 in 2015, mainly in Kimberley and the surrounding region, with a distribution of 9,161 copies in Q1 2015.

== Distribution areas ==
Distribution
	2008	2013
Eastern Cape		
Free State	Y	
Gauteng		
Kwa-Zulu Natal		
Limpopo		
Mpumalanga		
North West		
Northern Cape	Y	Y
Western Cape		

== Distribution figures ==
Circulation
	Net Sales
Jan – Mar 2015	9 161
Jan – Mar 2014	9 754
Oct – Dec 2012	9 375
July – Sep 2012	9 557
Apr – Jun 2012	9 403
Jan – Mar 2012	9 927

== Readership figures ==
Estimated Readership
	AIR
January – December 2012	76 000
July 2011 – June 2012	76 000
