= The Cape Chronicle =

The Cape Chronicle was a newspaper that operated from Cape Town in the Cape Colony, for a brief period from 1870 to 1871. It was edited by William Foster, who had previously edited the Cape Standard in the 1860s.
