= Nux (newspaper) =

- Founded: 1934
- Circulation: 8,000
- Price: Free
- Website: nux.ukzn.ac.za

Nux is the official student newspaper of the University of KwaZulu-Natal. Started in 1934 on the Pietermaritzburg campus, it is the oldest student newspaper in South Africa. The newspaper is primarily funded by the university, and 8000 copies are distributed to students across all campuses of the University of KwaZulu-Natal free of charge. Eight issues, of 16 pages each, are distributed per year. The content is created almost entirely by students, from journalism to design.

The name had its origins in the acronym Natal University Campus Chronicles (NUCCs), which became transformed into NUX, by homophony and rotation of the C's.

The Executive body sits in Pietermaritzburg, and is editorially independent of the university and its structures.

== See also ==
- List of newspapers in South Africa
