= The Kerryman =

Irish newspaper

- Type: Weekly newspaper
- Format: Broadsheet until 2009 Tabloid since 2006 published in both sizes (2006–2009).
- Owner(s): Mediahuis Ireland, a subsidiary of Mediahuis
- Editor: Kevin Hughes
- Founded: 1904
- Language: English
- Headquarters: 9/10 Denny Street, Tralee, County Kerry, Ireland
- City: Tralee
- Country: Ireland
- Website: independent.ie/regionals/kerryman/

The Kerryman is a weekly local newspaper published in County Kerry in Ireland by Mediahuis Ireland, a subsidiary of Mediahuis. The newspaper was founded in 1904 by Maurice Griffin and cousins Thomas and Daniel Nolan. Independent News & Media, then known as Independent Newspapers Limited acquired The Kerryman in 1972.

It has three different editions – North Kerry, South Kerry and Tralee. All three editions are tabloid format newspaper. The move of the Tralee edition to a tabloid format in 2006 meant that The Kerryman became Ireland's first dual format newspaper. The last broadsheet edition hit shops in 2009.

The main office is located on Denny Street in Tralee having moved from its previous base of over thirty years in the Clash Industrial Estate in 2007.

According to the Audit Bureau of Circulations, it had an average weekly circulation of 19,886 during the first six months of 2011, a fall of 3.5% year on year and 21% since 2008. These are the last circulation figures available as Independent News and Media, owner of the paper, refused to allow publication of audited figures for the second half of 2011 results as they "did not resonate with local advertisers". INM deregistered its twelve regional titles from auditing in February 2012, with a plan to instead provide "bespoke local surveys" of sales.

Kevin Hughes was appointed as editor in 2015.
