= De Oude Emigrant =

The De Oude Emigrant was the first newspaper to appear in the Transvaal. It was first published on 15 October 1859 in Potchefstroom but lasted only two years before closing down after controversy about its content.
