= City Press (South Africa) =

South African newspaper

- Type: Subsidiary
- Format: Online
- Owner: Media24
- Editor: Mondli Makhanya
- Founded: 1982; 44 years ago (as Golden City Press); 1983; 43 years ago (renamed City Press)
- Language: English
- Headquarters: Johannesburg, Gauteng, South Africa
- Sister newspapers: Rapport
- OCLC number: 70724022
- Website: news24.com/citypress

City Press is a South African online news publication. Founded in 1982, it is currently owned by major media organization Media24.

City Press used to be published nationally in paper format, on Sundays. The last City Press print edition was published on Sunday 22 December 2024, and the publication was merged into the online news24 banner.

In February 2026, Media24 announced that it was closing City Press.

== History ==
The newspaper was established in 1982 as the Golden City Press by James R. A. Bailey and the South African Associated Newspapers (SAAN) group. The following year, "Golden" was dropped from the newspaper's name. SAAN later withdrew from its partnership with Bailey and the newspaper ran into financial difficulties.

Nasionale Pers took over the publication of the newspaper as well as its sister publications, Drum and True Love & Family, on 1 April 1984.

In June 2024, Moneyweb reported the newspaper would cease print in October. Media24 declined to comment. A month later Media24 announced it will suspend the planned closure until the Competition Commission approves of its plan to sell newspaper distribution company On-The-Dot to Novus, which was the reason behind the paper's planned shuttering.

In February 2026, it was announced that Media24 would be closing City Press.

== Content ==
City Press runs a daily morning newsletter called On a Point of Order, a play on the South African Parliament scene, which frequently sees members of Parliament rising "on a point of order" to protest against something that somebody has said.

The publication's other newsletters include:

- Football Fever, a thrice weekly curation of news and analysis on the beautiful game;
- Sundays With City Press, which features all the highlights of the print edition; and
- #Trending – The Good Guide, a guide to all the latest culture, entertainment and tech news.

== Staff ==
The editor in chief of the City Press news brand is Mondli Makhanya. He has been at the helm of the news brand since 1 August 2016. Prior to Makhanya, the news brand was edited by Ferial Haffajee, who joined City Press on 1 July 2009.

It counts among its ranks of former editors Khathu Mamaila, Mathatha Tsedu and Len Kalane, who wrote a book about his experiences as editor of City Press, entitled The Chapter We Wrote: The City Press Story.

== Distribution areas ==
The newspaper is distributed nationally and in neighbouring countries, including Botswana, Lesotho, Namibia and Swaziland. It has a readership of about 2.5 million (source: AMPS 2001A).

Distribution
	2008	2013
Eastern Cape	Y	Y
Free State	Y	Y
Gauteng	Y	Y
Kwa-Zulu Natal	Y	Y
Limpopo	Y	Y
Mpumalanga	Y	Y
North West	Y	Y
Northern Cape	Y	Y
Western Cape	Y	Y

== Distribution figures ==
Circulation
	Net sales
October – December 2012	126 400
July – September 2012	135 148
April – June 2012	146 054
January – March 2012	163 705

== Readership figures ==
Estimated readership
	AIR
January – December 2012	1 757 000
July 2011 – June 2012	1 863 000

== See also ==
- List of newspapers in South Africa
