= Moxwêra wa Babaso =

Moxwêra wa Babaso was a newspaper published in Middelburg, Transvaal, South Africa, from 1903 to 1950, by the Berlin Missionary Society.
