= The Daily Independent (Cape Colony) =

Cape Colony newspaper

The Daily Independent was a newspaper that operated from Kimberley in the Cape Colony, from 1875 to 1893.
