= Rapport (newspaper) =

Afrikaans-language weekly newspaper

- Type: Weekly newspaper (Sunday)
- Format: Broadsheet
- Owner: Naspers
- Publisher: Media24
- Editor: Inge Kühne
- Founded: 1970
- Language: Afrikaans
- Headquarters: Johannesburg
- Circulation: 175,552
- Website: www.netwerk24.com/rapport

Rapport (English: 'Report') is an Afrikaans-language weekly newspaper (released on Sundays) in South Africa and published by Media24. Its head office is in Johannesburg. It is the second largest Sunday newspaper in South Africa after the Sunday Times. Inge Kühne has been the editor since 2021. In 2024 it was decided that the print edition will close due to declining sales. The last print edition was published on Sunday 22 December 2024, and it is now available online only.

== History ==
Rapport was established in 1970 (Jordaan 2014). The precursor was Die Beeld, an Afrikaans Sunday newspaper established in the 1960s. Die Beeld later merged with Dagbreek to become Rapport. The Beeld brand was re-established in 1974 with the founding of the daily newspaper, Beeld (Fourie 2007).

In June 2024, Moneyweb reported the newspaper would cease print in October. Media24 declined to comment. A month later Media24 announced it will suspend the planned closure until the Competition Commission approves of its plan to sell newspaper distribution company On-The-Dot to Novus, which was the reason behind the paper's planned shuttering.

== Distribution areas ==
Distribution
	2008	2013	2018
Eastern Cape	Y	Y	Y
Free State	Y	Y	Y
Gauteng	Y	Y	Y
Kwa-Zulu Natal	Y	Y	Y
Limpopo	Y	Y	Y
Mpumalanga	Y	Y	Y
North West	Y	Y	Y
Northern Cape	Y	Y	Y
Western Cape	Y	Y	Y

== Distribution figures ==
Circulation
	Net Sales
October - December 2012	213 460
July - September 2012	220 494
April - June 2012	220 485
January - March 2012	223 593
October - December 2013	187 288
July - September 2013	183 187
April - June 2013	192 328
January - March 2013	210 675
April - June 2014	175 552
January - March 2014	177 016

== Readership figures ==
Estimated Readership
	AIR
January – December 2012	1 286 000
January - December 2013	1 338 000

== See also ==
- List of newspapers in South Africa

== Bibliography ==
- Jordaan, Marenet (2014). "Poke me, I'm a journalist: The impact of Facebook and Twitter on newsroom routines and cultures at two South African weeklies". In Paterson, Chris (ed.). Journalism and Social Media in Africa: Studies in Innovation and Transformation. Routledge. ISBN 9780415745260.
- Fourie, Pieter Jacobus, ed. (2001). "The press". Media Studies: Institutions, theories, and issues. Routledge. ISBN 9780702156557.
