= The Burghersdorp Gazette =

Newspaper in South Africa

The Burghersdorp Gazette was a newspaper that operated from Burghersdorp in the Cape Colony, for a brief period from 1872 to 1873.
