= The Independent on Saturday =

South African newspaper

- Type: Weekly newspaper
- Owner(s): Independent News & Media
- Founded: 1998
- Website: www.iol.co.za/ios/

The Independent on Saturday is an English-language South African newspaper, part of Independent News & Media. It was launched in 1998 to replace the Saturday Paper, which was formed in the mid-1990s after the demise of the Saturday editions of the Daily News and the Mercury. The Independent on Saturday circulates primarily in the greater Durban area, but is also distributed to other parts of the KwaZulu-Natal province.

== Distribution areas ==
Distribution
	2008	2013
Eastern Cape		Y
Free State		
Gauteng		
Kwa-Zulu Natal	Y	Y
Limpopo		
Mpumalanga		
North West		
Northern Cape		
Western Cape		

== Distribution figures ==
Circulation
	Net Sales
Oct - Dec 2012	43 011
Jul - Sep 2012	43 780
Apr - Jun 2012	45 543
Jan - Mar 2012	45 803

== Readership figures ==
Estimated Readership
	AIR
Jan – Dec 2012	219 000
Jul 2011 – Jun 2012	208 000

== See also ==
- List of newspapers in South Africa
