= Southern Suburbs Tatler =

Local newspaper in the Southern Suburbs region of Cape Town, South Africa

The Southern Suburbs Tatler is a local newspaper in the Southern Suburbs region of Cape Town, Western Cape, South Africa. Its coverage area includes Woodstock, Observatory, Mowbray, Rondebosch, Rondebosch East, Newlands, Claremont, Pinelands, Kenilworth and Bishopscourt.
