= The Middelburg Gazette =

The Middelburg Gazette was a newspaper that operated from Middelburg in the Cape Colony, for a brief period from 1876 to 1881.
