= Daily News (Durban) =

South African municipal newspaper

- Type: Daily newspaper
- Owner: Independent News & Media SA
- Editor: Ayanda Mdluli
- Founded: 1878
- Language: English
- Website: www.iol.co.za/dailynews

Daily News is a daily newspaper owned by Independent News & Media SA and published every weekday afternoon in Durban, South Africa. It was called Natal Daily News between 1936 and 1962 and The Natal (Mercantile) Advertiser prior to 1936, going back to the 19th century.

In June 2010 the newspaper had daily average sales of 57,000 and an estimated daily readership of 320,000 people. It is an English-language newspaper and was first published in 1878.

== Supplements ==
- Tonight (Monday–Friday)
- Bollyworld (Monday)
- Motoring (Thursday)
- What's the Bet (Friday)
- Workplace (Wednesday)

== Distribution areas ==
Distribution
	2008	2013
Eastern Cape		Y
Free State		
Gauteng		
Kwa-Zulu Natal	Y	Y
Limpopo		
Mpumalanga		
North West		
Northern Cape		
Western Cape		

== Distribution figures ==
Circulation
	Net Sales
January – March 2015	26 793
January – March 2014	30 016
October – December 2012	30 743
July – September 2012	31 698
April – June 2012	33 093
January – March 2012	34 173

== Readership figures ==
Estimated Readership
	AIR
January – December 2012	295 000
July 2011 – June 2012	342 000

== See also ==
- List of newspapers in South Africa
