= The Herald (South Africa) =

South African newspaper

- Type: Daily newspaper
- Owner: Arena Holdings
- Publisher: Arena Holdings
- Founded: 1845
- Language: English
- Headquarters: Port Elizabeth, Eastern Cape, South Africa
- Website: www.heraldlive.co.za

The Herald is one of South Africa's oldest newspapers, first published on 7 May 1845. The newspaper is aimed at the people of Nelson Mandela Bay and is published daily from Monday to Friday, and is published in the form of "The Weekend Post" on Saturday. Online it is known as HeraldLIVE.

== Distribution figures ==
Circulation
	Net Sales
Oct – Dec 2015	19 880
Jun – Aug 2015	21 290
Jan – Mar 2015	20 919
Jan – Mar 2014	23 605

== See also ==
- List of newspapers in South Africa
