= Business Day (South Africa) =

South African business newspaper

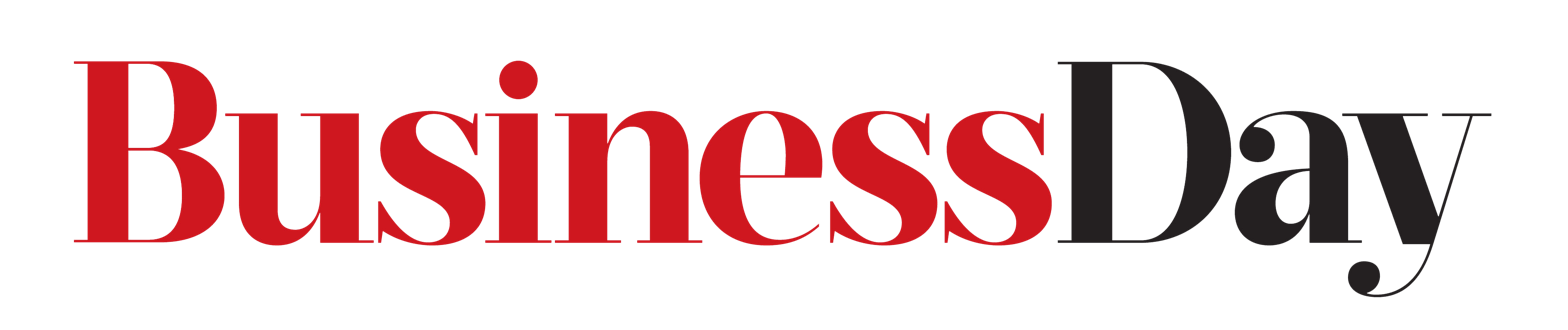
- Type: Daily newspaper
- Owner: Arena Holdings
- Editor: Alexander Parker
- Founded: 1 May 1985; 40 years ago
- Language: English
- Headquarters: Parktown
- Website: www.businessday.co.za

Logo in 2013

Business Day is a national daily newspaper in South Africa, published weekdays (Monday to Friday) and also available as an e-paper. Based in Parktown, Johannesburg, it is edited by Alexander Parker and published by Arena Holdings, which is also the parent company of the Financial Mail magazine and Business Day TV (formerly known as Summit TV).

The newspaper, launched on 1 May 1985, covers all major national and international news, with a specific focus on the South African economy and business sector, companies and financial markets. It also contains an influential opinion section with several popular columnists, along with coverage of sport, travel, books, arts and entertainment.

Business Day has its digital identity on BusinessLIVE. It also has apps for the iPhone and iPad, Android devices and Huawei devices.

== Supplements ==
- Motor News (Thursdays)
- Home Front (Once a month)
- Investors Monthly (Once a month)
- Sport (Once a month)
- Wanted (Once a month)

== Distribution areas ==
Distribution
	2008	2013
Eastern Cape	Y	Y
Free State	Y	Y
Gauteng	Y	Y
KwaZulu-Natal	Y	Y
Limpopo	Y	Y
Mpumalanga	Y	Y
North West	Y	Y
Northern Cape	Y	Y
Western Cape	Y	Y

== Distribution figures ==
Circulation
	Net Sales
Oct – Dec 2024	12 907
Jan – Mar 2015	29 559
Jan – Mar 2014	32 854
Oct – Dec 2012	35 149
Jul – Sep 2012	35 828
Apr – Jun 2012	35 070
Jan – Mar 2012	35 897

== Readership figures ==
Estimated Readership
	AIR
Jan – Dec 2012	59 000
Jul 2011 – Jun 2012	68 000

== See also ==
- List of newspapers in South Africa
