= TimesLIVE =

South African daily newspaper

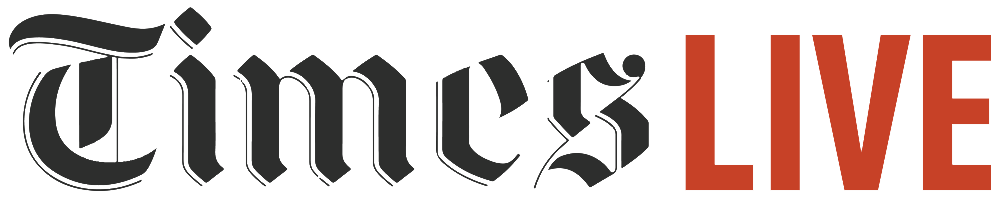
- Type: Online newspaper
- Owner(s): Arena Holdings
- Headquarters: Hill on Empire, 16 Empire Road, Parktown, Johannesburg, South Africa
- Sister newspapers: Sunday Times
- Website: timeslive.co.za

Logo of the newspaper in 2008

TimesLIVE (aka TshisaLIVE) is a South African online newspaper that started as The Times daily newspaper. The Times print version was an offshoot of Sunday Times, to whose subscribers it was delivered gratis; non-subscribers paid R2.50 per edition in the early years. It has been owned by Arena Holdings since November 2019 and is the second-largest news website in South Africa.

Times Live at the Behind the Scenes Awards (2024)

In 2024, Times Live, was nominated for "Most Informative Online Publication" at the Behind the Scenes Awards (BTSA). Other nominees in the same category included Zimoja Lezinto, Sunday World, Isolezwe, MDNtv, and Daily Sun. The BTSA recognizes excellence in media and entertainment within South Africa.

== Overview ==
The Times of South Africa was a daily printed newspaper that was delivered free to 137,054 (according to the Audit Bureau of Circulations statistics) Sunday Times subscribers five days a week. Tabloid in size, it was South Africa's first totally interactive newspaper, published in tandem with the TimesLIVE website. In The Times's newsroom, reporters worked alongside multimedia producers and photographers to produce content for the newspaper and the website. The Times was also available for purchase at a cover price of R4.00 in limited quantities, later at R5.50. The last editor of The Times was Andrew Trench.

In November 2017, the then owner of The Times, Tiso Blackstar Group, announced its intention to shut down the print version of the paper. It was replaced with a premium digital-only daily edition, Times Select, in early 2018, while TimesLIVE would continue to supply free content. Times Select was later renamed Sunday Times Daily to align it more closely with its print counterpart, the Sunday Times, the biggest Sunday newspaper in South Africa.

The TimesLIVE website publishes free breaking news, sport, entertainment and more, as well as video, audio and photo stories. It also hosts all Times Select, Sunday Times Daily and TshisaLIVE (entertainment and celebrity news) digital content.

In 2019, Arena Holdings acquired all the media assets of Tiso Blackstar for R1.05 billion.

== Supplements ==
- Motor Mania (came out on a Friday)

== Former distribution areas (print edition) ==
Distribution
	2008	2013
Eastern Cape	Y	Y
Free State	Y	Y
Gauteng	Y	Y
Kwa-Zulu Natal	Y	Y
Limpopo	Y	Y
Mpumalanga	Y	Y
North West	Y	Y
Northern Cape	Y	
Western Cape	Y	Y

== Former distribution figures (print edition) ==
Circulation
	Net Sales
Oct - Dec 2015	100 360
Jun - Aug 2015	109 480
Jan - Mar 2015	140 647
Jan - Mar 2015	140 647
Jan - Mar 2014	142 603
Oct - Dec 2012	146 956
Jul - Sep 2012	140 078
Apr - Jun 2012	142 383
Jan - Mar 2012	142 111

== Former readership figures (print edition) ==
Estimated Readership
	AIR
– 12 January December 2012	287 000
July 2011 – June 2012	342 000

== See also ==
- List of newspapers in South Africa
- See also Arena Holdings website: https://arena.africa/
- See also the owner of Arena Holdings: https://lebashe.com/
- See more on the titles and other media arms of by Arena Holdings: https://arena.africa/industry-sector/
- See contact information for Arena Holdings: https://arena.africa/contact-us/
