= Financial Mail =

South African business publication

- Editor: Marc Hasenfuss
- Categories: News magazine
- Frequency: Weekly
- First issue: 1959; 67 years ago
- Company: Apex Partners Holdings
- Based in: Johannesburg, Gauteng, South Africa
- Language: English
- Website: fm.co.za

Financial Mail (or the FM, as it is also known) is South Africa's oldest business news publication. The weekly magazine was launched in 1959 with John Marvin, who had been seconded from The Economist, as the first editor.

Based in Johannesburg, it is one of the few publications which saw its total circulation rise in recent years to 17,161 per week at the end of 2025, from 15,292 in 2015.

Since its launch, it has been edited by some of the country's most respected journalists, including George Palmer, Steven Mulholland, Nigel Bruce, Peter Bruce, Caroline Southey, Barney Mthombothi, Tim Cohen, Rob Rose, Natasha Marrian, and Marc Hasenfuss. The FM has undergone a number of major "look and feel" changes, including in 2016, which saw it reclaim its position as the most widely read English business weekly in the country.

The magazine is widely read by policymakers, and it has led coverage on the political economy. In recent times, this includes the implosion at the country's electricity provider Eskom, the country's unemployment crisis, and South Africa's largest corporate fraud at Steinhoff International.

== Awards ==
The publication's journalists have also won South Africa's pre-eminent financial journalism award, the Sanlam Award, more times than any other title, with winners including Claire Bisseker, Sikonathi Mantshantsha, Itumeleng Mahabane, Ann Crotty, Tim Cohen and Rob Rose.

The magazine's covers have also won awards for design, including a 2017 edition featuring artwork by Conrad Botes on South Africa's credit rating downgrade to junk status. Other acclaimed artists who have provided cover art include Michele Mathison, who depicted the end of Robert Mugabe's rule in Zimbabwe, and Blessing Ngubeni, whose visceral depiction of the 2021 riots was entitled 'Anatomy of an Insurrection'.

== Ownership ==
For many years, it was 50% owned by Pearson and 50% by the Times Media Group, which also owned the Business Day and Sunday Times in South Africa. In 2013, Times Media bought that 50% stake from Pearson, leading to it becoming a wholly-owned subsidiary.

In 2025, 70% of the FM was bought by a private company called Apex Partners, with its former owner, now renamed as Arena Holdings, retaining the other 30%. In 2026, Apex bought two other online publications, Miningmx which was founded by the respected mining journalist David McKay, and Currency News which was founded in 2024 by Giulietta Talevi, Sarah Buitendach, Vernon Wessels and Rob Rose.

These three titles were then merged to form The Financial Mail Group, with the magazine relaunched with a new look and branding in August 2026.
