= Media24 =

South African media company owned by Naspers

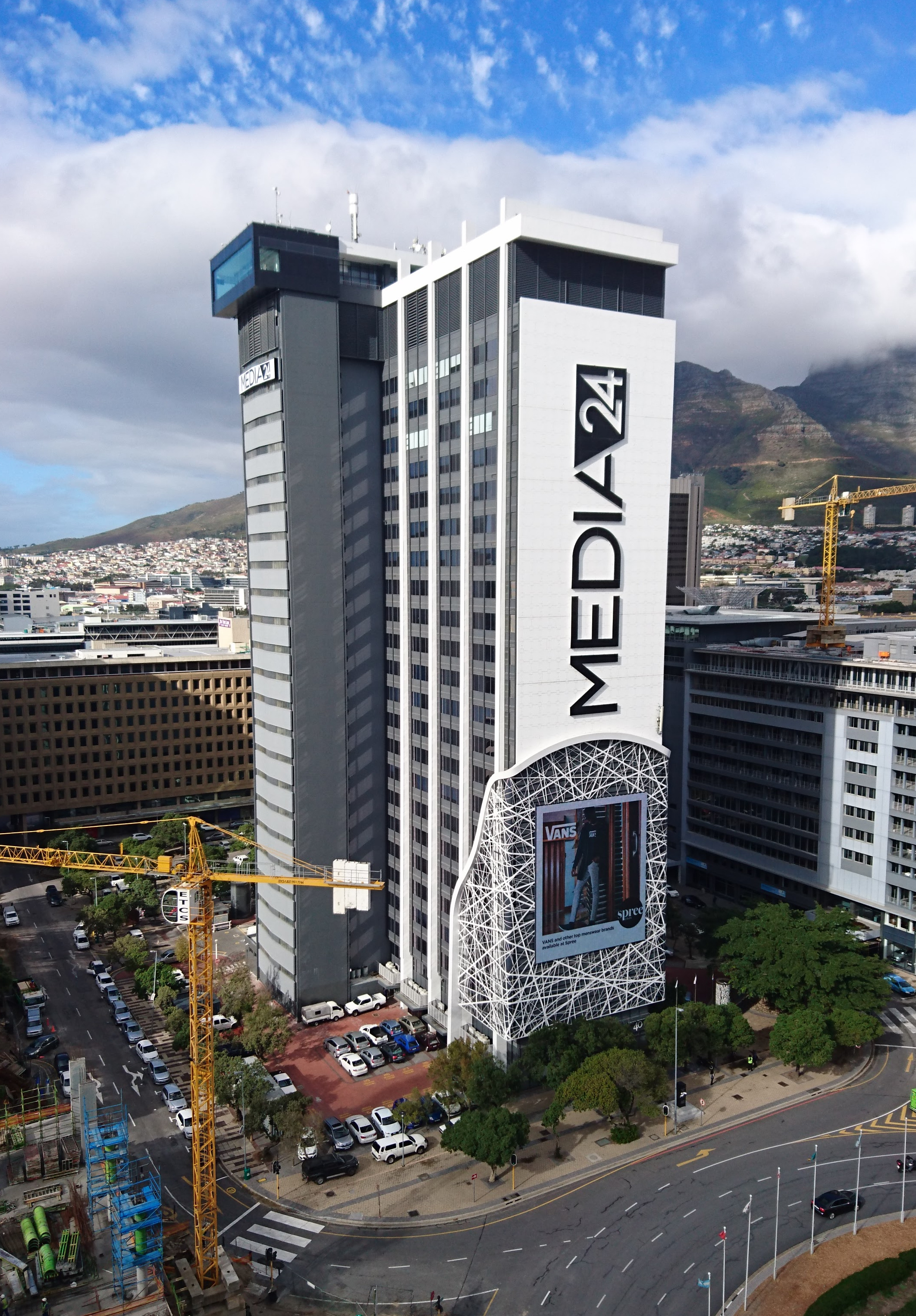
- The Media24 Centre in Cape Town CBD is the headquarters of Media24, as well as parent company Naspers
- Type: Subsidiary
- Industry: Digital media Mass media Publishing
- Founded: August 1, 2000; 26 years ago
- Headquarters: Cape Town, South Africa
- Area served: South Africa
- Key people: Minette Ferreira (CEO); Rachel Jafta (Chair)
- Products: Digital media Magazines; Books; Television
- Revenue: ▼ R1.67 billion (2026)
- Operating income: ▼ -R263 million (2026)
- Parent: Naspers
- Divisions: Media24 Media; Media24 TV; Media24 Books
- Website: media24.com

Media24 is a South African media company with interests in digital news and services, newspapers, magazines, television and book publishing. It is wholly owned by major South African mass media company Naspers, and is headquartered in Cape Town.

Media24's digital portfolio includes News24 and Netwerk24. News24 is the country’s most widely used digital news site and has been named South Africa’s most trusted news brand for seven consecutive years.

== History ==
Media24 forms part of the South African media assets historically developed within the Naspers group. In 2015 the company separated its printing division, Paarl Media Group, rebranding it as Novus Holdings and listing it on the Johannesburg Stock Exchange.

In 2020, as the Covid-19 pandemic accelerated structural declines in print advertising and circulation, Media24 announced a restructuring of parts of its magazine and newspaper portfolios. The changes included closures, reduced frequencies, outsourced production and shifts to digital-only formats.

In 2020–21 Media24 proposed and completed the unwind of its Welkom Yizani broad-based black economic empowerment scheme through a cash repurchase of all Welkom Yizani shares, approved by shareholders in January 2021.

In October 2024 the company said it had received Competition Commission approval to sell its media logistics business, On the Dot, together with a portfolio of community and specialist publications, to Novus Holdings. The move was part of broader restructuring, as part of a new digital-first news strategy, centered on websites News24 and Netwerk24. Media24 said the final print editions of several titles would be published by 31 December 2024, with brands continuing digitally from January 2025.

In February 2026, the company began consultations on further print rationalisation, including the proposed closure of City Press.

In June 2026, Media24 posted a 27% decrease in revenue, and a R263 million loss - 60% larger than the previous year. The group attributed its 2026 results to a decline in legacy revenue, as well as investment costs associated with technology upgrades.

In July 2026, it was announced that CEO Raj Lalbahadur would step down and, from 1 September, be replaced by Head of Media24's Media Division Minette Ferreira.

== Operations and brands ==
Media24 has transitioned from a print‑centric model to a digital‑first approach in response to changing media consumption. The group is organised into three divisions:

- Media24 Media – digital media, magazines, and advertising and content marketing services
- Media24 TV – television production and broadcasting
- Media24 Books – book publishing and distribution across educational and trade lists

=== Selected brands and units ===
- Digital news: News24 (English); Netwerk24 (Afrikaans)
- Newspapers: Daily Sun; Die Burger; Rapport
- Magazines: Huisgenoot, You, Drum; Sarie, Kuier, Fairlady; Visi; Tuis | Home; Weg!; Go!
- Books: Jonathan Ball Publishers; NB Publishers; Van Schaik Publishers; Via Afrika
- Television and video: VIA (DStv 147); POP24 (in‑house video production for broadcast, streaming and digital platforms)

Several legacy print titles have shifted to digital‑only publication as part of the group’s restructuring.

== Reach ==
In May 2025, Media24 recorded 265,290,431 page views, making it South Africa’s top publisher by this measure. In its interim results for the six months to 30 September 2025, parent company Naspers said News24 and Netwerk24 together had 211,321 paid subscribers, up 19 per cent on the previous period.

== Corporate affairs and governance ==
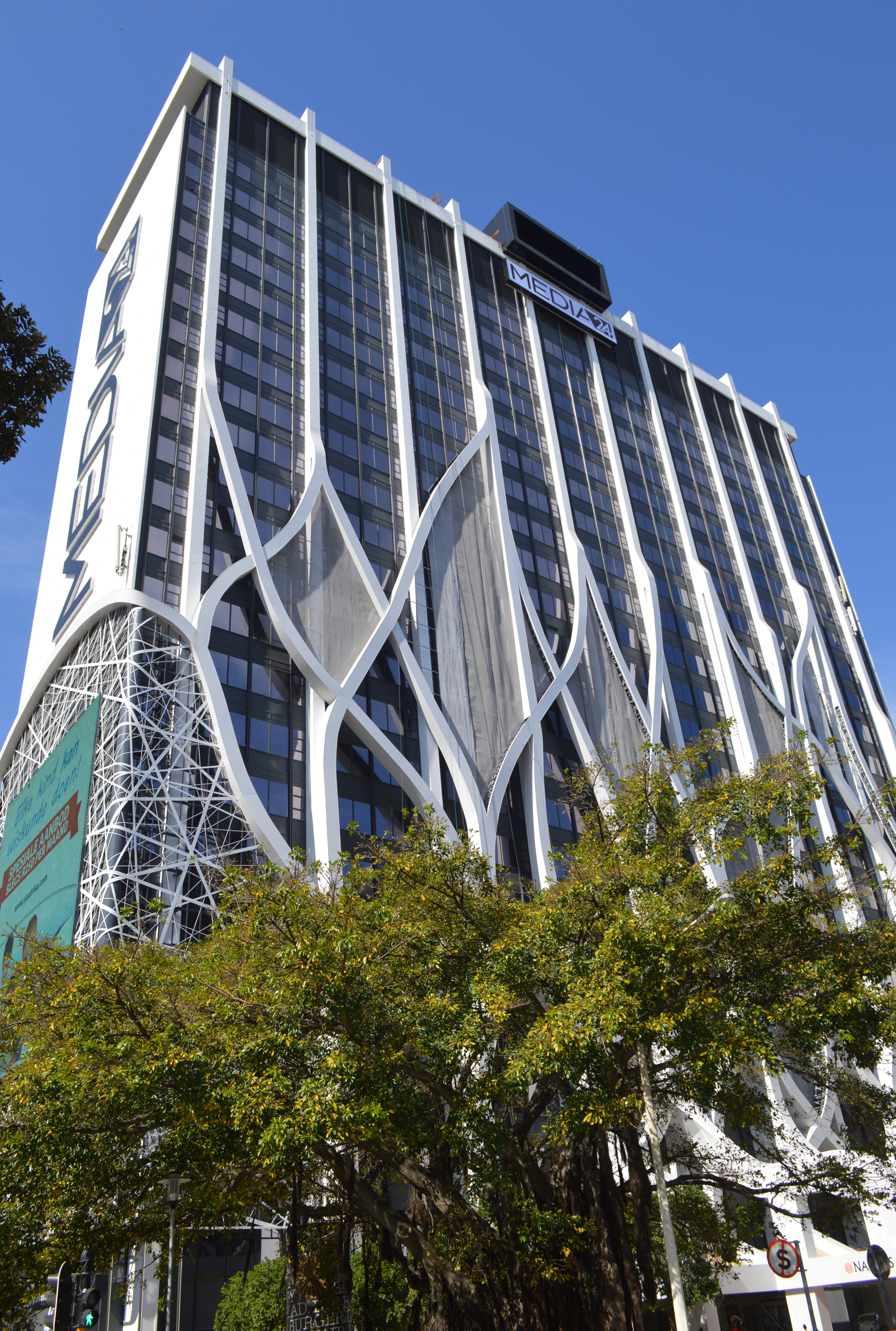
Media24 Centre (formerly the Naspers Centre), Cape Town, 2015

Media24 is wholly owned by Naspers, which is listed on the Johannesburg Stock Exchange. The company’s head office is at 40 Heerengracht, Cape Town. Raj Lalbahadur was appointed chief executive in April 2025, having served as interim CEO. The board is chaired by Rachel Jafta. Media24 publishes its governance policies and statutory information on its website.

== Financials ==
For the year to 31 March 2025, Media24 reported revenue of US$141m and an adjusted EBIT loss of US$15m. In the six months to 30 September 2025, revenue was US$45m with an adjusted EBITDA loss of US$9m.

== Legal and regulatory matters ==
Between 2011 and 2019 Media24 was the subject of a predatory pricing complaint concerning its community newspapers in the Goldfields region. In 2015 the Competition Tribunal found a contravention of section 8(c) of the Competition Act and later imposed behavioural remedies. In March 2018 the Competition Appeal Court set aside the Tribunal’s decision on the merits. In July 2019 the Constitutional Court dismissed the Competition Commission’s appeal, leaving no contravention proven.

== See also ==
- Naspers
- News24
- Mass media in South Africa
