= Ambrosia (given name) =

Ambrosia is a feminine given name of Greek origin. Notable people with the name include:

- Ambrosia Anderson (born 1984), American basketball player
- Ambrosia Malone (born 1998), Australian field hockey player
- Ambrosia María Serrano y Rodriguez (1836–1875), Mexican clergyman and bishop
- Ambrosia Parsley, American musician
- Ambrosia Tønnesen (1859–1948), Norwegian sculptor

== Fictional ==
- Ambrosia (Hyade), a nymph in Greek mythology

== See also ==
- Abrasimov/Abrosimov, Abroskin, Ambro, Ambrogi, Ambrogetti, Ambrogio, Ambroise, Ambros, Ambrose (given name, surname), Ambrosetti, Ambrosi, Ambrosia, Ambrosini, Ambrosio / D'Ambrosio, Ambrosius, Ambrosoli, Ambroz, Ambrož, Ambroziak, Ambrožič, Ambroziewicz, Ambroży, Ambrus, Amvrosy, Amvrosimov
