= Ambroz (given name) =

Ambrož is a Croatian masculine given name, cognate of Ambrose/Ambrosius. Notable people with the name include:

- Ambroz Antun Kapić, Archbishop of Antivari
- Ambroz Haračić (1855-1916), Croatian botanist
- Ambroz Testen, Croatian Franciscan expressionistic painter

== See also ==
- Abrasimov/Abrosimov, Abroskin, Ambro, Ambrogi, Ambrogetti, Ambrogio, Ambroise, Ambros, Ambrose (given name, surname), Ambrosetti, Ambrosi, Ambrosia, Ambrosini, Ambrosio / D'Ambrosio, Ambrosius, Ambrosoli, Ambroz, Ambrož, Ambroziak, Ambrožič, Ambroziewicz, Ambroży, Ambrus, Amvrosy, Amvrosimov
