= Ambrosio =

Ambrosio is an Italian surname and Italian and Spanish masculine given name. The feminine given name equivalent is Ambrosia. Similarly to "Ambrosius", it is derived from the Ancient Greek word ἀμβρόσιος, ambrosios "divine, immortal". Notable people with the suname include:

== Given name ==
- Ambrósio I of Kongo
- Ambrosio Aimar
- Ambrosio Alfinger
- Ambrosio Altamura
- Ambrosio Angelini
- Ambrosio Boccanegra
- Ambrosio Cotes
- Ambrosio Cruz Jr.
- Ambrosio Echebarria Arroita
- Ambrosio Echemendia
- Ambrosio Flores
- Ambrosio Fracassini
- Ambrósio Francisco Ferro, Brazilian Roman Catholic saint
- Ambrosio Galindez
- Ambrosio Gonzales
- Ambrosio Guillen
- Ambrosio Higgins
- Ambrosio José Gonzales
- Ambrosio Kibuuka
- Ambrósio Leitão da Cunha, Brazilian politician
- Ambrosio Lukoki
- Ambrosio Martin
- Ambrosio Martinez
- Ambrosio Martínez Bustos
- Ambrosio María Serrano y Rodriguez
- Ambrosio Montt Luco
- Ambrosio Morales
- Ambrosio O'Higgins, 1st Marquess of Osorno
- Ambrosio Padilla
- Ambrosio Peñailillo
- Ambrosio Plaza
- Ambrosio Rianzares Bautista
- Ambrosio Rocha
- Ambrosio Santos
- Ambrosio Solorzano
- Ambrosio Zaldívar
- Ambrosio de Benavides
- Ambrosio de Funes Villalpando
- Ambrosio de Letinez
- Ambrosio de Morales

== Surname ==
- Alessandra Ambrosio (born 1981), a Brazilian model
- Arturo Ambrosio (1870–1960), an Italian film producer
- Fabrisia Ambrosio, Brazilian-born physical therapist and academic
- Franco Ambrosio (1932–2009), an Italian businessman
- Frank Ambrosio (born 1949), American philosopher
- Gabriele Ambrosio (1844–1918), Italian sculptor
- Giovanni Ambrosio (1420–1484), Italian dancer and writer on dance (Guglielmo Ebreo da Pesaro)
- Luigi Ambrosio (born 1963), an Italian mathematician
- Marco Ambrosio (born 1973), Italian former footballer
- Rodolfo Ambrosio (born 1961), Argentine rugby union coach
- Sandra Ambrosio (born 1963), Argentine former cyclist
- Thomas Ambrosio (born 1971), American political scientist
- Valentino Ambrosio (born 2000), American football player
- Vittorio Ambrosio (1879–1958), an Italian general from World War I and World War II

== See also ==
- Abrasimov/Abrosimov, Abroskin, Ambro, Ambrogi, Ambrogetti, Ambrogio, Ambroise, Ambros, Ambrose (given name, surname), Ambrosetti, Ambrosi, Ambrosia, Ambrosini, Ambrosio / D'Ambrosio, Ambrosius, Ambrosoli, Ambroz, Ambrož, Ambroziak, Ambrožič, Ambroziewicz, Ambroży, Ambrus, Amvrosy, Amvrosimov
- Ambrosiano (disambiguation)
