= Ambrosini =

Ambrosini is an Italian surname. Notable people with the surname include:

- Abele Ambrosini (1915–1943), Italian partisan
- Bartolomeo Ambrosini (1588–1657), Italian botanist, physician and naturalist
- Brenno Ambrosini, Italian pianist
- Carlo Ambrosini (1954–2023), Italian comic book artist and writer
- Cesare Ambrosini (born 1990), Italian footballer
- Chiara Ambrosini (born 2006), Argentine field hockey player
- Claudio Ambrosini (born 1948), Italian composer and conductor
- Dario Ambrosini (1918–1951), Italian Grand Prix motorcycle road racer
- Emilio Ambrosini (1850–1912), Italian architect
- Enrique Domingo Dussel Ambrosini (1934–2023), Argentine theologian and historian
- Ernesto Ambrosini (1894–1951), Italian athlete who competed mainly in the 3000 metres steeplechase
- Filippo Ambrosini (born 1993), Italian pair skater
- Floriano Ambrosini (1557–1621), Italian architect and engineer
- Gaspare Ambrosini, (1886–1986), Italian statesman
- James Ambrosini (born 1991), Australian-born Italian rugby union player
- Marco Ambrosini, (born 1964), Italian composer and musician living in Germany
- Maria Luisa Ambrosini, Italian author
- Mario Oriani-Ambrosini (1960–2014), Italian constitutional lawyer and politician
- Massimo Ambrosini, (born 1977), Italian footballer
- Rachelina Ambrosini (1925–1941), Italian teenager who is venerated by the Roman Catholic Church
- Tito Ambrosini (1903–1965), Italian water polo player
- Vittorio Ambrosini (1893–1971), Italian politician

== See also ==
- Abrasimov/Abrosimov, Abroskin, Ambro, Ambrogi, Ambrogetti, Ambrogio, Ambroise, Ambros, Ambrose (given name, surname), Ambrosetti, Ambrosi, Ambrosia, Ambrosini, Ambrosio / D'Ambrosio, Ambrosius, Ambrosoli, Ambroz, Ambrož, Ambroziak, Ambrožič, Ambroziewicz, Ambroży, Ambrus, Amvrosy
