= Ambrogio =

- Pronunciation: [amˈbrɔːdʒo]
- Gender: Male
- Language: Italian

Origin
- Language: Latin
- Derivation: Ambrosius
- Meaning: "Immortal"

Other names
- Variant forms: Ambrosio, Ambrogino, Ambrosino, Ambrogione, Ambrosone
- Nicknames: Giotto, Bogio, Boso, Bosone
- Cognates: Ambrose (English), Ambroise (French)
- Related names: Ambrogia, Ambrosia, Ambrose, Ambroise

Ambrogio is a given name. Notable people with this name include:

- Saint Ambrogio (Ambrose), patron saint of Milan
- Ambrogio Lorenzetti (c. 1290 – 1348), painter
- Ambrogio Damiano Achille Ratti, the birth name of Pope Pius XI
- Ambrogio Bergognone, Renaissance painter
- Ambrogio Spinola, 1st Marquis of the Balbases, general
- Ambrogio Donini, politician and historian
- Ambrogio Morelli, bicycle racer
- Ambrogio Foppa, goldsmith
- Ambrogio Frangiolli, architect
- Ambrogio Calepino, lexicographer
- Ambrogio Besozzi, Baroque painter
- Ambrogio Casati, modern painter
- Ambrogio Fogar, rally driver
- Ambrogio Levati, gymnast
- Ambrogio Minoja, classical composer
- Ambrogio Gianotti, Italian priest and partigiano

== See also ==
- Abrasimov/Abrosimov, Abroskin, Ambro, Ambrogi, Ambrogetti, Ambrogio, Ambroise, Ambros, Ambrose (given name, surname), Ambrosetti, Ambrosi, Ambrosia, Ambrosini, Ambrosio / D'Ambrosio, Ambrosius, Ambrosoli, Ambroz, Ambrož, Ambroziak, Ambrožič, Ambroziewicz, Ambroży, Ambrus, Amvrosy, Amvrosimov
- Sant'Ambrogio (disambiguation)
