= Ambroży =

Ambroży is a Polish surname and given name. Notable people with the name include:

- Sándor Ambrózy (1903–1992), Hungarian sculptor
- Wenzel Bernhard Ambrozy (1723–1806), Czech painter
- Ambroży Augustyn Chevreux (1728–1792), French Benedictine
- Ambroży Kleks or Pan Kleks (Mr. Inkblot), a fictional character in the novel series by Polish writer Jan Brzechwa
- Ambroży Mieroszewski (1802–1884), Polish painter
- Ambroży Mikołaj Skarżyński of Bończa (1787–1868), Napoleonic officer, Chevalier de l'Empire and Polish general

== See also ==
- Abrasimov/Abrosimov, Abroskin, Ambro, Ambrogi, Ambrogetti, Ambrogio, Ambroise, Ambros, Ambrose (given name, surname), Ambrosetti, Ambrosi, Ambrosia, Ambrosini, Ambrosio / D'Ambrosio, Ambrosius, Ambrosoli, Ambroz, Ambrož, Ambroziak, Ambrožič, Ambroziewicz, Ambroży, Ambrus, Amvrosy
