= D'Ambrosio =

D'Ambrosio is a patronymic surname originating in Italy, meaning the son of Ambrosio. Ambrosio meaning divine, from the Latin Ambrosius and subsequently from the ancient Greek Ambrosia, the food of the gods and an elxir of life used by the gods of Olympus to maintain immortality and to heal wounds. The name Ambrogio is used in the north and Ambrosio in the central and south of Italy.

It may also refer to:

- Alfredo D'Ambrosio (1871–1914), Italian violinist and composer
- Antonino D'Ambrosio (born 1971), Italian-American author, filmmaker, producer, and visual artist
- Brian Anthony D'Ambrosio, American journalist and author
- Charles D'Ambrosio (born 1958), American short story writer and essayist
- Danilo D'Ambrosio (born 1988), Italian football (soccer) player
- Dario D'Ambrosio (born 1988), Italian football (soccer) player
- Diego D'Ambrosiano, founder of Diego's Hair Salon in Washington, D.C.
- Domenico D'Ambrosio (born 1975), former Italian male long-distance runner
- Gerardo D'Ambrosio (1930–2015), Italian magistrate and politician
- Jérôme d'Ambrosio (born 1985), Belgian racing driver of Italian descent
- Joe D'Ambrosio (born 1953), American sports broadcaster and play-by-play announcer
- Lily D'Ambrosio (born 1964), Australian politician
- Louis D'Ambrosio, businessman, former CEO of Sears Holdings Corporation and of Avaya
- Marcelo D'Ambrosio, Uruguayan sprint canoer
- Meredith D'Ambrosio (born 1941), American jazz singer
- Ossian D'Ambrosio (born 1970), Italian modern Druid, musician and jeweler
- Pasquale D'Ambrosio, a Swiss footballer
- Paul D'Ambrosio, American journalist and novelist
- Pompeo D'Ambrosio (1917–1998), Venezuelan businessman of Italian origin
- Ubiratàn D'Ambrosio (1932–2021), Brazilian historian of mathematics and mathematics teacher
- Vanessa D'Ambrosio (born 1988), Captain Regent of San Marino from April until October 2017 (alongside Mimma Zavoli)

== See also ==
- Abrasimov/Abrosimov, Abroskin, Ambro, Ambrogi, Ambrogetti, Ambrogio, Ambroise, Ambros, Ambrose (given name, surname), Ambrosetti, Ambrosi, Ambrosia, Ambrosini, Ambrosio / D'Ambrosio, Ambrosius, Ambrosoli, Ambroz, Ambrož, Ambroziak, Ambrožič, Ambroziewicz, Ambroży, Ambrus, Amvrosy, Amvrosimov
- Ambrosiano (disambiguation)
