= Ambrosius =

Ambrosius or Ambrosios (a Latin adjective derived from the Ancient Greek word ἀμβρόσιος, ambrosios "divine, immortal") is a given name and a surname. Notable people with the name include:

== Given name ==
- Ambrosius Alexandrinus, a Latinization of the name of Ambrose of Alexandria (before 212 – c.250), Egyptian theologian and saint
- Ambrose (Aurelius Ambrosius) (c. 340–397), bishop of Milan and saint
- Ambrosius of Optino (1812–1891), Russian Orthodox monk and saint
- Ambrosius Gudko (1867–1918), Russian Orthodox bishop and saint
- Ambrosius Aurelianus, fifth-century war leader of the Romano-British
- Ambrosius of Georgia (1861–1927), Catholicos Patriarch of All Georgia
- Ambrosius, Metropolitan of Helsinki (born 1945), Finnish priest
- Ambrosius Beber (fl. 1610–1620), German composer
- Ambrosius Benson (c. 1495/1500 – 1550), Italian painter
- Ambrosius Blarer (1492–1564), Swiss reformer
- Ambrosius Bosschaert (1573–1621), Dutch painter
- Ambrosius Bosschaert II (1609–1645), Dutch painter, son of the above
- Ambrosius Brueghel (1617–1675), Flemish Baroque painter
- Ambrosius Ehinger (c. 1500 – 1533), German conquistador
- Ambrosius Francken I (1544–1618), Flemish Baroque painter
- Ambrosius Francken II (1590–1632), Flemish painter, nephew of the above
- Ambrosius Frobenius (1537–1602), Swiss printer and publisher
- Ambrosius Haingura (1957–2000), Namibian activist and politician
- Ambrosius Holbein (c. 1494 – c. 1519), German and Swiss painter, drawer and printmaker, elder brother of Hans Holbein the Younger
- Ambrosius Hubrecht (1853–1915), Dutch zoologist
- Ambrosius Kumbwa (born 1963), Namibian politician
- Ambrosius Lobwasser (1515–1585), German humanist and translator
- Macrobius (fl. 5th century), Roman grammarian and philosopher (Ambrosius Theodosius Macrobius in later manuscripts)
- Ambrosius Moibanus (1494–1554), German Lutheran theologian and reformer
- Ambrosius Pelargus (c. 1493 – 1561), German anti-reformer Dominican theologian
- Ambrosius Petruzzy (died 1652), Italian sculptor
- Ambrosios Pleianthidis, Greek Orthodox metropolitan bishop
- Ambrosius Stub (1705–1758), Danish poet

== Surname ==
- Hermann Ambrosius (1897–1983), German composer and music educator
- Johanna Ambrosius (1854–1939), German poet
- Marsha Ambrosius (born 1977), English singer-songwriter
- Stephan Ambrosius (born 1998), German footballer
- Thomas Ambrosius (born 1969), Danish former footballer

== Fictional characters ==
- Merlin, in Arthurian legend, named Merlin Ambrosius in Geoffrey of Monmouth's Historia Regum Britanniae
- Ambrosius, in the film Labyrinth
- Ambrosius Goldenloin, in the film and graphic novel Nimona

== See also ==
- Abrasimov/Abrosimov, Abroskin, Ambro, Ambrogi, Ambrogetti, Ambrogio, Ambroise, Ambros, Ambrose (given name, surname), Ambrosetti, Ambrosi, Ambrosia, Ambrosini, Ambrosio / D'Ambrosio, Ambrosius, Ambrosoli, Ambroz, Ambrož, Ambroziak, Ambrožič, Ambroziewicz, Ambroży, Ambrus, Amvrosy
- Abrosius
