= Ambroise (name) =

Ambroise (French: [ɑ̃.bʁwaz]) is a given name and surname. People with the name include:

== Ambroise of Normandy ==
- Ambroise (fl. c. 1190), a Norman poet and chronicler of the Third Crusade.

== Given name ==
- Ambroise, Lord of Monaco (died 1433), ruled 1419–1427
- Ambroise Abdo (1820–1876), Syrian Melkite Greek Catholic bishop
- Ambroise Begue (born 1995), French footballer
- Ambroise Boimbo (died 1989), Congolese citizen who snatched the sword of King Baudouin I of Belgium in 1960
- Ambroise Chevreux (1728–1792), French Benedictine
- Ambroise Croizat (1901–1951), French syndicalist and communist politician
- Ambroise Dubois (1542/3–1614/5), Flemish-born French painter
- Ambroise Dupont (born 1937), French politician
- Ambroise Félicitet (born 1993), Martiniquais footballer
- Ambroise Garin (1875–1969), Italian-born French bicycle racer
- Ambroise Gboho (born 1994), Ivorian footballer
- Ambroise Guellec (born 1941), French politician
- Ambroise Janvier (1613–1682), French Benedictine and theologian
- Ambroise de Loré (1396–1446), French military commander, baron of Ivry in Normandy, and companion of Joan of Arc
- Ambroise Michel (born 1982), French actor, director, and writer
- Ambroise Ngoya (born 1964), Congolese footballer
- Ambroise Noumazalaye (1933–2007), Congolese politician; Prime Minister of Congo-Brazzaville 1966–1968
- Ambroise Ouédraogo (born 1948), Burkinabé Roman Catholic bishop in Niger
- Ambroise Oyongo (born 1991), Cameroonian footballer
- Ambroise Paré (c. 1510–1590), French barber surgeon
- Ambroise Rendu (educator) (1778–1860), French educator and translator
- Ambroise Rendu (politician) (1874–1973), French politician
- Ambroise D. Richard (1850–1917), Canadian lawyer and political figure
- Ambroise Roux (1921–1999), French businessman and political advisor
- Ambroise Sarr (1950–2024), Senegalese boxer and wrestler
- Ambroise Tardieu (1788–1841), French cartographer and engraver
- Ambroise Thomas (1811–1896), French composer
- Ambroise Uwiragiye (born 1980), Rwandan long-distance runner
- Ambroise Verschaffelt (1825–1886), Belgian horticulturist
- Ambroise Vollard (1866–1939), French art dealer
- Ambroise Wonkam, Cameroonian physician
- Ambroise Yxemerry (1917–2013), French Polynesian editor and journalist

== Surname ==
- Gary Ambroise (born 1985), French footballer
- Jackson Ambroise (born 1952), Haitian painter
- Magloire Ambroise (1774–1807), hero of the Haitian Independence
- Yvon Ambroise (born 1942), Indian Roman Catholic bishop emeritus of Tuticorin

== See also ==
- Abrasimov/Abrosimov, Abroskin, Ambro, Ambrogi, Ambrogetti, Ambrogio, Ambroise, Ambros, Ambrose (given name, surname), Ambrosetti, Ambrosi, Ambrosia, Ambrosini, Ambrosio / D'Ambrosio, Ambrosius, Ambrosoli, Ambroz, Ambrož, Ambroziak, Ambrožič, Ambroziewicz, Ambroży, Ambrus, Amvrosy
