= Abrosimovo =

Abrosimovo (Russian: Абросимово) is the name of several rural localities in Russia:

- Abrosimovo, Kostroma Oblast, a settlement in Mikhalevskoye Settlement of Neysky District in Kostroma Oblast; 58°19′N 44°7′E
- Abrosimovo, Mari El Republic, a village in Vasilyevsky Rural Okrug of Yurinsky District in the Mari El Republic; 56°35′N 45°49′E
- Abrosimovo, Oryol Oblast, a village in Abolmasovsky Selsoviet of Khotynetsky District in Oryol Oblast
- Abrosimovo, Pskov Oblast, a village in Opochetsky District of Pskov Oblast
- Abrosimovo, Andreapolsky District, Tver Oblast, a village in Aksenovskoye Rural Settlement of Andreapolsky District in Tver Oblast
- Abrosimovo, Kimrsky District, Tver Oblast, a village in Ustinovskoye Rural Settlement of Kimrsky District in Tver Oblast
- Abrosimovo, Vesyegonsky District, Tver Oblast, a village in Kesemskoye Rural Settlement of Vesyegonsky District in Tver Oblast
- Abrosimovo, Kameshkovsky District, Vladimir Oblast, a village in Kameshkovsky District of Vladimir Oblast
- Abrosimovo, Vyaznikovsky District, Vladimir Oblast, a village in Vyaznikovsky District of Vladimir Oblast
- Abrosimovo, Voronezh Oblast, a selo in Dyachenkovskoye Rural Settlement of Bogucharsky District in Voronezh Oblast

== See also ==
- Abrosimov, Russian last name
