= Ambrus (name) =

Ambrus is Hungarian name that may refer to

Given name

- Ambrus Balogh (1915–1978), Hungarian sports shooter
- Ambrus Lele (born 1958), Hungarian handball player
- Ambrus Nagy (1927–1991), Hungarian fencer

Surname

- Attila Ambrus (born 1967), Hungarian bank robber
- Edita Ambrušová (1920–2015), Slovak painter
- Ferencz Ambruș (born 1930, date of death unknown), Romanian boxer
- Jan Ambrus (1899–1994), Slovak fighter pilot
- Ludovic Ambruş (born 1946), Romanian wrestler
- Mariann Ambrus (1956–2007), Hungarian rower
- Miklós Ambrus (1933–2019), Hungarian water polo player
- Victor Ambrus (1935–2021), Hungarian illustrator
- Vladimir Ambrus, Serbian rugby union player
- Zoltán Ambrus (1861–1932), Hungarian writer and translator

== See also ==
- Abrasimov/Abrosimov, Abroskin, Ambro, Ambrogi, Ambrogetti, Ambrogio, Ambroise, Ambros, Ambrose (given name, surname), Ambrosetti, Ambrosi, Ambrosia, Ambrosini, Ambrosio / D'Ambrosio, Ambrosius, Ambrosoli, Ambroz, Ambrož, Ambroziak, Ambrožič, Ambroziewicz, Ambroży, Ambrus, Amvrosy
