= Ambroziak =

Ambroziak (Polish pronunciation: [amˈbrɔʑak]) is a Polish surname. People with the surname include:

- Ewa Ambroziak (1950–2023), Polish athlete
- Jeffrey Ambroziak (born 1966), American cartographer, inventor, and attorney
- Peter Ambroziak (born 1971), Canadian former professional ice hockey player, former coach and executive
- Sylwester Ambroziak (born 1964), Polish sculptor
- Zdzisław Ambroziak (1944–2004), Polish volleyball player

== See also ==
- Abrasimov/Abrosimov, Abroskin, Ambro, Ambrogi, Ambrogetti, Ambrogio, Ambroise, Ambros, Ambrose (given name, surname), Ambrosetti, Ambrosi, Ambrosia, Ambrosini, Ambrosio / D'Ambrosio, Ambrosius, Ambrosoli, Ambroz, Ambrož, Ambroziak, Ambrožič, Ambroziewicz, Ambroży, Ambrus, Amvrosy
