= Ambros =

Ambros is a name and a surname derived from Ambrosius and is equivalent to Ambrose in English. Spellings in other languages include Catalan: Ambrós, Croatian: Ambroš. Notable people with the name include:

== Given name ==
- Ambrós, name for Miguel Ambrosio Zaragoza (1913–1992), comic strip cartoonist
- Ambros Martín (born 1968), Spanish former handball player and current coach
- Ambros Seelos (1935–2015), German composer, singer, arranger, conductor
- Ambros Sollid (1880–1973), Norwegian agronomist and politician.
- Ambros Speiser (1922–2003), Swiss engineer and scientist
- Ambros Uchtenhagen (1928–2022), Swiss psychiatrist

== Surname ==
- August Wilhelm Ambros (1816–1876), Austrian composer and music historian of Czech descent
- Harald Ambros (born 1980), Austrian equestrian
- Krystyna Ambros (born 1961), Polish rower
- Michael Hermann Ambros (1750–1809), Austrian publisher and author of Cantastoria
- Otto Ambros (1901–1990), German chemist and Nazi war criminal
- Paul Ambros (1933–2015), German ice hockey player
- Tihana Ambroš (born 1980), Croatian handball player
- Victor Ambros (born 1953), American developmental biologist
- Vladimir Ambros (born 1993), Moldovan footballer
- Wolfgang Ambros (born 1952), Austrian songwriter and rock/pop singer

== See also ==
- Abrasimov/Abrosimov, Abroskin, Ambro, Ambrogi, Ambrogetti, Ambrogio, Ambroise, Ambros, Ambrose (given name, surname), Ambrosetti, Ambrosi, Ambrosia, Ambrosini, Ambrosio / D'Ambrosio, Ambrosius, Ambrosoli, Ambroz, Ambrož, Ambroziak, Ambrožič, Ambroziewicz, Ambroży, Ambrus, Amvrosy
