= Abrosimov =

Абро́симов
- Romanization: Abrosimov
- Gender: masculine
- Language: Russian

Other gender
- Feminine: Abrosimova

Abrosimov (Russian: Абро́симов; masculine) or Abrosimova (Абро́симова; feminine) is a Russian surname.

== Variants ==
Variants of this surname include:

- Abrasimov/Abrasimova (Абра́симов/Абра́симова)
- Abraskin/Abraskina (Абра́скин/Абра́скина)
- Abrosenko (Абросе́нко)
- Abrosenkov/Abrosenkova (Абро́сенков/Абро́сенкова)
- Abrosin/Abrosina (Абро́син/Абро́сина)
- Abroskin/Abroskina (Абро́с(ь)кин/Абро́с(ь)кина)
- Abroskov/Abroskova (Абро́сков/Абро́скова)
- Abrosov/Abrosova (Абро́сов/Абро́сова)
- Abroshin/Abroshina (Абро́шин/Абро́шина)
- Abroshchenko (Абро́щенко)
- Ambrosov/Ambrosova (Амбро́сов/Амбро́сова)
- Amvrosimov/Amvrosimova (Амвро́симов/Амвро́симова)
- Amvrosov/Amvrosova (Амвро́сов/Амвро́сова)
- Amvrosyev/Amvrosyeva (Амвро́сьев/Амвро́сьева)
- Obrosimov/Obrosimova (Обро́симов/Обро́симова)
- Obrosov/Obrosova (Обро́сов/Обро́сова), and
- Ovrosimov/Ovrosimova (Овро́симов/Овро́симова).

All these surnames derive from various forms of the given name Ambrose (Amvrosy), which is of Greek origin where it means god-like. Another possibility is that the surname derives from the Russian dialectal word "абросим" (abrosim), meaning a person who gives oneself airs, a person who plays the peacock.

== Notable people ==
=== Abrosimov ===
- Alexander Abrosimov (1948–2011), Russian mathematician
- Alexander Abrosimov, Russian volleyball player playing for Zenit Kazan in the 2012 FIVB Volleyball Men's Club World Championship
- Alexey Abrosimov, one of the picks in the 2012 KHL Junior Draft
- Ivan Abrosimov, one of the referees during the 2014–2015 Russian Cup
- Kirill Abrosimov, Russian swimmer participating in the 2013 World Aquatics Championships
- Pavel Abrosimov, Soviet architect, recipient of the Honorary Fellowship of the American Institute of Architects
- Sergei Abrosimov (born 1977), former Russian association football player
- Yury Abrosimov, one of the volunteers killed during the 2014 pro-Russian unrest in Ukraine

=== Abrosimova ===
- Anastasia Abrosimova (born 1990), Russian triathlete
- Elena Abrosimova, double bass musician involved with recording Umoja, 2006 Dutch album
- Marina Abrosimova, real name of MakSim, Russian singer
- Svetlana Abrosimova (born 1980), Russian basketball player
- Tamara Abrosimova, Soviet actress from Sentimentalny roman, a 1976 Soviet drama movie

== See also ==
- Abrasimov/Abrosimov, Abroskin, Ambro, Ambrogi, Ambrogetti, Ambrogio, Ambroise, Ambros, Ambrose (given name, surname), Ambrosetti, Ambrosi, Ambrosia, Ambrosini, Ambrosio / D'Ambrosio, Ambrosius, Ambrosoli, Ambroz, Ambrož, Ambroziak, Ambrožič, Ambroziewicz, Ambroży

Ambrus, Amvrosy

- Abrosimovo, several rural localities in Russia
