= Ambrosi =

Ambrosi is both a surname and a given name. Notable people with the name include:

Surname

- Alejandra Ambrosi, Mexican television actress
- Christie Ambrosi (born 1976), American softball player
- Francesco Ambrosi (1821–1897), Italian botanist, librarian ethnologue and historian.
- Gianpaolo Ambrosi (born 1940), Italian luger
- Marco degli Ambrosi, also known as Melozzo da Forlì (c. 1438–1494), Italian Renaissance painter and architect.
- Martina Ambrosi (born 2001), Italian ski jumper
- Paúl Ambrosi (born 1980), Ecuadorian football player
- Václav Bernard Ambrosi, Czech painter

Given name

- Ambrosi Hoffmann (born 1977), Swiss alpine skier

Given name, spelling variant

- Ambrose of Georgia (1861–1927), Georgian religious figure and scholar

== See also ==
- Abrasimov/Abrosimov, Abroskin, Ambro, Ambrogi, Ambrogetti, Ambrogio, Ambroise, Ambros, Ambrose (given name, surname), Ambrosetti, Ambrosi, Ambrosia, Ambrosini, Ambrosio / D'Ambrosio, Ambrosius, Ambrosoli, Ambroz, Ambrož, Ambroziak, Ambrožič, Ambroziewicz, Ambroży, Ambrus, Amvrosy
- Ambrosi's Cave Salamander
