= Ambrose (surname) =

Ambrose is a surname. Notable people with the surname include:

- Alice Ambrose (1906–2001), American philosopher, logician, and author
- Ashley Ambrose (born 1970), former American football player
- Autpert Ambrose (c. 730–784), Frankish Benedictine monk who became abbot of San Vicenzo, Italy
- Charles Ambrose (1791–1856), English organist, composer, choir director, and music educator
- Curtly Ambrose (born 1963), West Indian cricketer
- Darren Ambrose (born 1984), English footballer
- David Ambrose (born 1943), British novelist and screenwriter
- Dean Ambrose (born 1985), ring name of American professional wrestler Jonathan Good
- Dick Ambrose (born 1953), former American football linebacker
- Donetta Ambrose (born 1945), United States federal judge
- Eddie Ambrose (1894–1994), American jockey
- Efe Ambrose (born 1988), Nigerian footballer
- Erin Ambrose (born 1994), Canadian ice hockey player
- Ethel Mary Murray Ambrose (1874–1934), Australian medical missionary in India
- Gladys Ambrose (1930–1998), English film and television actress
- Isaac Ambrose (1604–1663/64), English Puritan divine
- James R. Ambrose (1922–2017), former aerospace executive and U.S. Under Secretary of the Army
- John Ambrose (Royal Navy officer) (c. 1705–1771), Royal Navy officer
- John Thomas Ambrose, former Deputy U.S. Marshal, convicted in 2009 of leaking information about a federal witness
- John Wolfe Ambrose (1838–1899), Irish-American engineer and developer
- J. J. Ambrose (born 1981), American mixed martial artist
- Lauren Ambrose (born 1978), American actress
- Marcos Ambrose (born 1976), Australian race car driver
- Myles Ambrose, former U.S. Commissioner of Customs
- Paddy Ambrose (1928–2002), Irish footballer and coach
- Patrick Ambrose (born 1991), Australian rules football player
- Paul Ambrose (1868–1941), Canadian organist, conductor, composer, and music educator
- Richard Ambrose (born 1972), former Australian rules footballer
- Rob Ambrose (born 1970), American footballer and coach
- Robert Ambrose (1824–1908), Canadian composer
- Rona Ambrose (born 1969), Canadian politician
- Rosalind Ambrose (born 1953), Vincentian radiologist
- Sharon Ambrose (1939–2017), U.S. politician
- Simon Ambrose, 2007 winner of the BBC reality TV show The Apprentice, chairman of the London Contemporary Orchestra
- Stephen Ambrose (1936–2002), American historian
- Stuart Ambrose (born 1943), former English cricketer
- Tim Ambrose (born 1982), English cricketer
- Tommy Ambrose, Canadian singer-songwriter
- Tony Ambrose (1933–2008), British rally driver
- Walt Ambrose (1905–unknown), American footballer
- Warren Ambrose (1914–1995), American mathematician
- William Ambrose (1813–1873), bardic name Emrys, 19th-century Welsh language poet
- William Ambrose (politician) (1832–1908), English judge and politician
- J. Willis Ambrose (1911–1974), first President of the Geological Association of Canada

== Fictional characters ==
- Axl Ambrose, an ambulance character from Firebuds
- Desmond Ambrose, a character on Desmond's
- Sean Ambrose, a character from Mission: Impossible 2
- Simon Ambrose, a character from the Johnny English movies

== See also ==
- Abrasimov/Abrosimov, Abroskin, Ambro, Ambrogi, Ambrogetti, Ambrogio, Ambroise, Ambros, Ambrose (given name, surname), Ambrosetti, Ambrosi, Ambrosia, Ambrosini, Ambrosio / D'Ambrosio, Ambrosius, Ambrosoli, Ambroz, Ambrož, Ambroziak, Ambrožič, Ambroziewicz, Ambroży, Ambrus, Amvrosy
