= Ambrose (given name) =

Ambrose is a given name. It is derived from Greek ambrosios, meaning (belonging to) immortal(s), god-like; cf. ambrosia, food of gods. Notable people with the name include:

- St. Ambrose of Milan
- St. Ambrose Traversari, also referred to as Ambrose of Camaldoli, (1386–1439), Italian monk and theologian
- Ambrose Akinmusire (born 1982), Nigerian-American jazz trumpeter
- Ambrose Bierce (1842–1913), American author
- Ambrose Burnside (1824–1881), American general and namesake of sideburns
- Ambrose Mandvulo Dlamini (1968–2020), Swazi politician and businessman
- Ambrose Dudley, 3rd Earl of Warwick (c. 1530–1590), English nobleman and general
- Ambrose Gaines IV (born 1959), American swimmer better known as Rowdy Gaines
- John Ambrose Fleming (1849–1945), English electrical engineer and physicist. Invented the first thermionic valve or vacuum tube, designed the radio transmitter with which the first transatlantic radio transmission was made, established the right-hand rule used in physics.
- Ambrose L. "Aquafortis" Jordan (1789-1865), the defense for Smith A. Boughton, a leader of the Anti-Rent War.
- Ambrose K. Hutchison (1856–1932), Hawaiian resident leader of the leper settlement of Kalaupapa
- Ambrose Kenny-Smith (born 1992), Australian singer and harmonicist of The Murlocs and King Gizzard and the Lizard Wizard
- Ambrose O'Brien (1885–1968), Canadian industrialist
- Ambrose Page (1723–1791), Rhode Island admiralty judge who declined appointment as an associate justice of the Rhode Island Supreme Court
- Ambrose Small (1863–1919), Canadian theatre magnate
- Ambrose Tarrant (1866–1938), Australian cricketer
- Ambrose Parry, pseudonym of Scottish authors Chris Brookmyre and Marisa Haetzman

== Amby ==
- Amby Burfoot (born 1946), American long-distance runner and journalist
- Amby Fogarty (1933–2016), Irish footballer
- Amby McConnell (1883–1942), American baseball player
- Amby Paliwoda (1909–1999), American animator

== See also ==
- Abrasimov/Abrosimov, Abroskin, Ambro, Ambrogi, Ambrogetti, Ambrogio, Ambroise, Ambros, Ambrose (given name, surname), Ambrosetti, Ambrosi, Ambrosia, Ambrosini, Ambrosio / D'Ambrosio, Ambrosius, Ambrosoli, Ambroz, Ambrož, Ambroziak, Ambrožič, Ambroziewicz, Ambroży, Ambrus, Amvrosy
