= Ambrožič =

Ambrožič, also spelled Ambrožić, Ambrozić or Ambrozic, is a surname. Notable people with the surname include:

- Aloysius Ambrozic (1930–2011), Slovene Canadian Catholic cardinal archbishop of Toronto
- Roman Ambrožič (born 1973), Slovene rower

== See also ==
- Abrasimov/Abrosimov, Abroskin, Ambro, Ambrogi, Ambrogetti, Ambrogio, Ambroise, Ambros, Ambrose (given name, surname), Ambrosetti, Ambrosi, Ambrosia, Ambrosini, Ambrosio / D'Ambrosio, Ambrosius, Ambrosoli, Ambroz, Ambrož, Ambroziak, Ambrožič, Ambroziewicz, Ambroży, Ambrus, Amvrosy
