= Amvrosy =

Amvrosy (Russian: Амвро́сий) is a Russian Christian male first name. It is derived from Greek ambrosios, meaning (belonging to) immortal(s), god-like; cf. ambrosia, food of gods. Abrosim (Абро́сим) is a colloquial variant of this first name. Other variants include colloquial and Old Church Slavonic Ambrosy (Амбро́сий); additional colloquial variants include Afrosim (Афро́сим), Ofrosim (Офро́сим), Abrosy (Абро́сий), Avrosim (Авро́сим), Obrosim (Обро́сим), Ambros (Амбро́с), Abros (Абро́с), and Obros (Обро́с). The diminutives of "Amvrosy" include Abrosya (Абро́ся), Amvroska (Амвро́с(ь)ка), and Rosya (Ро́ся).

The patronymics derived from "Amvrosy" are "Амвро́сиевич"/"Амвро́сьевич" (Amvrosiyevich/Amvrosyevich; masculine) and "Амвро́сиевна"/"Амвро́сьевна" (Amvrosiyevna/Amvrosyevna; feminine). The patronymics derived from "Abrosim" are "Абро́симович" (Abrosimovich; masculine) and its colloquial form "Абро́симыч" (Abrosimych), and "Абро́симовна" (Abrosimovna; feminine). Those with the name include:

- Amvrosy Buchma (1891–1957), Soviet actor and director
- Amvrosy Metlinsky (1814–1870), Ukrainian poet and ethnographer
- Amvrosy Optinsky or Ambrose of Optina (1812–1891), Russian monk canonized by the Russian Orthodox Church

== See also ==
- Abrasimov/Abrosimov, Abroskin, Ambro, Ambrogi, Ambrogetti, Ambrogio, Ambroise, Ambros, Ambrose (given name, surname), Ambrosetti, Ambrosi, Ambrosia, Ambrosini, Ambrosio / D'Ambrosio, Ambrosius, Ambrosoli, Ambroz, Ambrož, Ambroziak, Ambrožič, Ambroziewicz, Ambroży, Ambrus, Amvrosy
