= Ambrosoli =

Ambrosoli is a surname. Notable people with the name include:

- Daniela Ambrosoli (born 1941), Swiss entrepreneur, philanthropist, founder and president of the Pierino Ambrosoli Foundation
- Giorgio Ambrosoli (1933–1979), Italian lawyer
- Giuseppe Ambrosoli (1923– 1987), Italian Roman Catholic priest
- Umberto Ambrosoli (born 1971), Italian politician

== See also ==
- Abrasimov/Abrosimov, Abroskin, Ambro, Ambrogi, Ambrogetti, Ambrogio, Ambroise, Ambros, Ambrose (given name, surname), Ambrosetti, Ambrosi, Ambrosia, Ambrosini, Ambrosio / D'Ambrosio, Ambrosius, Ambrosoli, Ambroz, Ambrož, Ambroziak, Ambrožič, Ambroziewicz, Ambroży, Ambrus, Amvrosy
- Dr. Ambrosoli Memorial Hospital, Hospital in Northern Uganda
- Pierino Ambrosoli Foundation, Foundation based in Switzerland
