= Saint-Ambroise =

Saint-Ambroise may refer to:

- Saint-Ambroise, Quebec, Canada
- Saint-Ambroise Church, Montreal, Quebec, Canada
- Saint-Ambroise-de-Kildare, Quebec, Canada
- Saint-Ambroise station, a Paris Metro station
- Saint-Ambroise, Paris, a Roman Catholic parish church in France

== See also ==
- Saint Ambrose
- Sant'Ambrogio (disambiguation)
- Ambroise (disambiguation)
