= Ambro =

Ambro is a surname. Notable people with the surname include:

- Jerome Ambro (1928–1993), American politician
- Jerome G. Ambro (1897–1979), American lawyer and politician
- Thomas L. Ambro (born 1949), American judge

== See also ==
- Abrasimov/Abrosimov, Abroskin, Ambro, Ambrogi, Ambrogetti, Ambrogio, Ambroise, Ambros, Ambrose (given name, surname), Ambrosetti, Ambrosi, Ambrosia, Ambrosini, Ambrosio / D'Ambrosio, Ambrosius, Ambrosoli, Ambroz, Ambrož, Ambroziak, Ambrožič, Ambroziewicz, Ambroży, Ambrus, Amvrosy
