= Abroskin =

Abroskin (Russian: Абро́скин or Абро́ськин; masculine) or Abroskina (Абро́скина or Абро́ськина; feminine) is a Russian last name, a variant of Abrosimov. The following people bear this last name:

- Aleksandr Abroskin (b. 1987), Russian football player

== See also ==
- Abrasimov/Abrosimov, Abroskin, Ambro, Ambrogi, Ambrogetti, Ambrogio, Ambroise, Ambros, Ambrose (given name, surname), Ambrosetti, Ambrosi, Ambrosia, Ambrosini, Ambrosio / D'Ambrosio, Ambrosius, Ambrosoli, Ambroz, Ambrož, Ambroziak, Ambrožič, Ambroziewicz, Ambroży,

Ambrus, Amvrosy
