= Ambrogetti =

Ambrogetti is an Italian surname. Notable people with the name include:

- Alessio Ambrogetti (born 1989), Italian footballer
- Francesca Ambrogetti, a member of the Italian Agenzia Nazionale Stampa Associata
- Giuseppe Ambrogetti (1780 - after 1838), Italian opera singer

== See also ==
- Abrasimov/Abrosimov, Abroskin, Ambro, Ambrogi, Ambrogetti, Ambrogio, Ambroise, Ambros, Ambrose (given name, surname), Ambrosetti, Ambrosi, Ambrosia, Ambrosini, Ambrosio / D'Ambrosio, Ambrosius, Ambrosoli, Ambroz, Ambrož, Ambroziak, Ambrožič, Ambroziewicz, Ambroży, Ambrus, Amvrosy
