= Ambrosetti =

Ambrosetti is an Italian surname. Notable people with the surname include:

- Antonio Ambrosetti (1944–2020), Italian mathematician
- Bianca Ambrosetti (1914–1929), Italian gymnast
- Franco Ambrosetti (born 1941), Swiss jazz musician
- Flavio Ambrosetti (1919–2012), Swiss jazz musician
- Gabriele Ambrosetti (born 1973), Italian footballer and manager
- Juan Bautista Ambrosetti (1865–1917), Argentine archaeologist, ethnographer and naturalist

== See also ==
- Abrasimov/Abrosimov, Abroskin, Ambro, Ambrogi, Ambrogetti, Ambrogio, Ambroise, Ambros, Ambrose (given name, surname), Ambrosetti, Ambrosi, Ambrosia, Ambrosini, Ambrosio / D'Ambrosio, Ambrosius, Ambrosoli, Ambroz, Ambrož, Ambroziak, Ambrožič, Ambroziewicz, Ambroży, Ambrus, Amvrosy
- Ambrosetti Forum, an annual international economic conference held in Cernobbio, Italy
- Ambrosetti Museum, a museum of ethnography overseen by the University of Buenos Aires, in Argentina
