= Echemendia =

Echemendia is a surname. Notable people with the surname include:

- Ambrosio Echemendia (c. 1843–?), Cuban slave and poet
- Anthony Echemendia (born 1999), Cuban wrestler
- Ralph Echemendia (fl. 2011), Cuban-American cyber security specialist

== See also ==
- Etchemendy
