= Obrosov =

Obrosov (Russian: Обро́сов; masculine) or Obrosovo (Обро́сово; feminine) is a Russian last name, a variant of Abrosimov. The following people bear this last name:

- Dr. Obrosov (d. 1937), one of the Kremlin doctors signing a false report regarding death of Nadezhda Alliluyeva, second wife of Joseph Stalin

== See also ==
- Obrosovo, several rural localities in Russia
