= Fort Santa Cruz do Paraguaçu =

- Forte de Santa Cruz do Paraguaçu
- Maragogipe, Bahia in Brazil
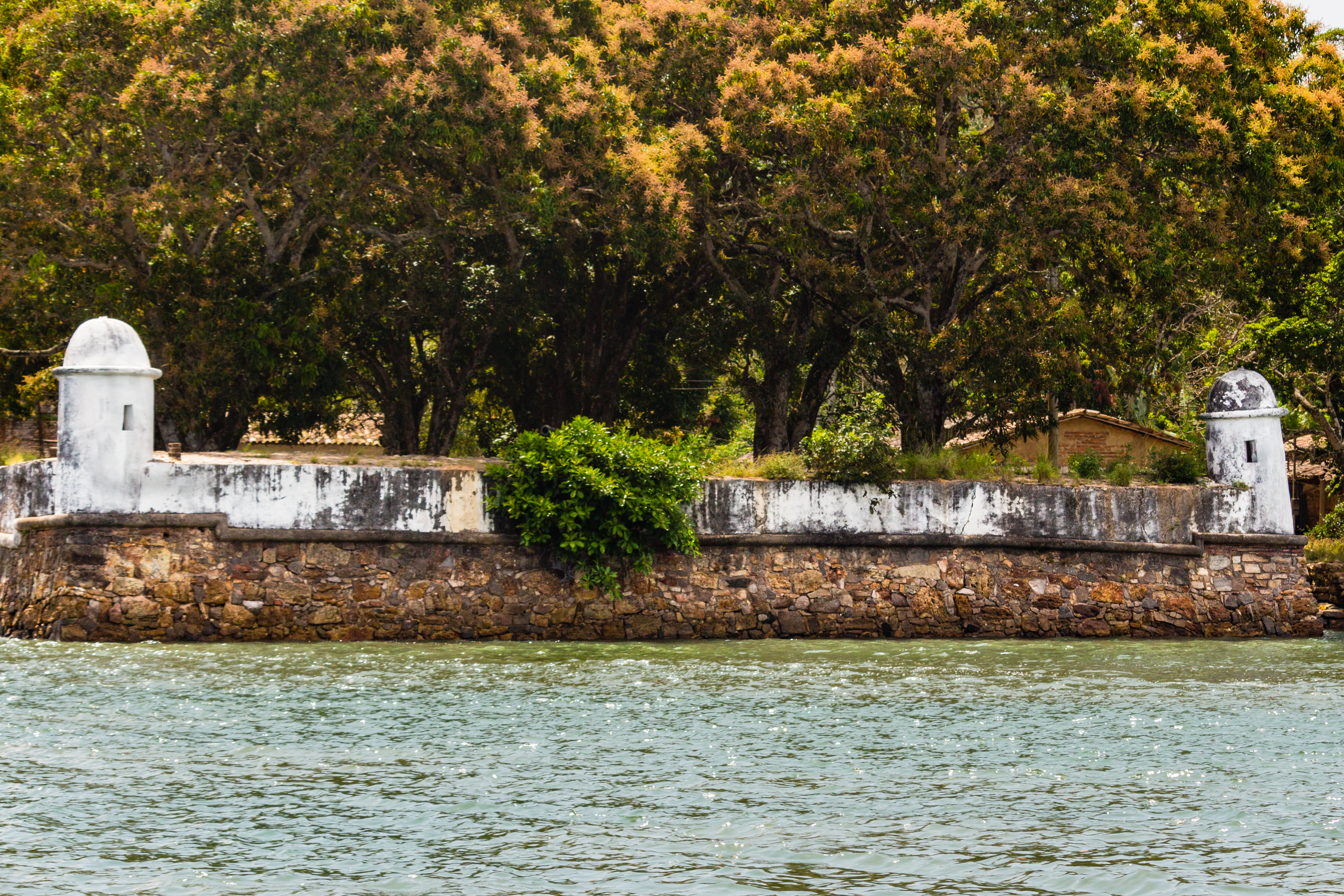

Site information
- Type: Fort
- Condition: Ruined

Location
- Fort Santa Cruz
- Coordinates: 12.7986°S 38.8613°W

Site history
- Built: 1659
- Events: Dutch-Portuguese War; Brazilian War of Independence

Fort Santa Cruz do Paraguaçu is located on the right bank of the mouth of the Paraguaçu River, in the current city of Maragojipe, state of Bahia, dominating the access to the Recôncavo Baiano.

== History ==
Three forts existed in the region in 1659, the most important of which was the Fort Santa Cruz de Paraguaçu, also known as the Forte Real de Paraguaçu, Forte da Barra do Paraguaçu, or Paraguaçu Fort. There is no consensus among scholars regarding its original builders. Its current shape probably dates to the beginning of the 18th century, built over an earlier structure erected in the first half of the 17th century.

At the time of the Dutch invasion of Brazil, the Fort Santa Cruz crossed fire with the Fort of Forca in the opposite bank of the river, and its task was to block the access of invaders to the hinterland of Iguape and the sugar mills located there, along with the towns of Maragogipe and Cachoeira.

A typical coastal fort, it was built out of stone, with brick sentry boxes, and was flanked by water on three of its six sides,

=== The 18th century ===
In 1759 the fort possessed seven dismounted artillery pieces and its barracks were in a ruined condition, according to a report by engineer José António Caldas. Caldas produced a sketch of the fort, featuring an irregular hexagon plan and battlements. Over the courtyard on the entry side, a single storey building housed the service quarters of the fort, such as the command house, troop accommodations, mess etc. It was commanded by a captain.

It was restored in 1762 by the government of Bahia, probably by João Abreu de Carvalho Contreiras. After a new inspection by the aforementioned engineer José António Caldas, the barracks were restored.

=== The 19th century ===
The fort underwent maintenance works after the arrival in Brazil of the Portuguese royal family, during the Peninsular War.

After 1816 it was considered to lack military use and as was decommissioned, decaying as a result.

It was noted by Emperor Pedro II in 1859, when he registered in his travel log:

"November 4 - (...) 2 and 40' - On the left bank [of the Paraguaçu river] one can see the old fountain, where the ships of Bahia used to come for water. On the right side a little further on a spit of land stand the ruins of the fortlet called of Paraguaçu. 2 3/4 - On the left bank, the site of the German [...]".

Another reference was made by Epiphanio Pessoa in 1859 regarding this voyage, in "Narração dos Preparativos, Festejos, e Felicitações que tiveram Lugar na Província da Bahia":

"[...] At 9 1/2 [of November 10, 1859] the squadron passed by the "fortlet", small stronghold abandoned nowadays, on the right bank of the river, famous for having prevented the Portuguese from recapturing a ship the cachoeiranos had captured during the Independence Wars."

=== In the 20th century ===
Its ruins were classified as a build of the property of the Union since 1938, by the then Service of National Historical and Artistic Heritage.

A project was made in 1959 to stabilize and restore the monument, however, it was not implemented. The courtyards stone walls and a circular, domed sentry turret along with a cannon remain.

== Bibliography ==
- BARRETO, Aníbal (Cel.). Fortificações no Brasil (Resumo Histórico). Rio de Janeiro: Biblioteca do Exército Editora, 1958. 368 p.
- FALCÃO, Edgard de Cerqueira. Relíquias da Bahia (Brasil). São Paulo: Of. Gráficas Romili e Lanzara, 1940. 508 p. il. p/b
- GARRIDO, Carlos Miguez. Fortificações do Brasil. Separata do Vol. III dos Subsídios para a História Marítima do Brasil. Rio de Janeiro: Imprensa Naval, 1940.
- OLIVEIRA, Mário Mendonça de. As Fortificações Portuguesas de Salvador quando Cabeça do Brasil. Salvador: Omar G., 2004. 264 p. il.
- PEDRO II, Imperador do Brasil. Viagens pelo Brasil: Bahia, Sergipe, Alagoas, 1859-1860 (2ª ed.). Rio de Janeiro: Bom Texto; Letras e Expressões, 2003. 340 p. il.
- ROHAN, Henrique de Beaurepaire. Relatorio do Estado das Fortalezas da Bahia, pelo Coronel de Engenheiros Henrique de Beaurepaire Rohan, ao Presidente da Província da Bahia, Cons. Antonio Coelho de Sá e Albuquerque, em 3 de Agosto de 1863. RIGHB. Bahia: Vol. III, nr. 7, mar/1896. p. 51-63.
- SOUSA, Augusto Fausto de. Fortificações no Brazil. RIHGB. Rio de Janeiro: Tomo XLVIII, Parte II, 1885. p. 5-140.
