= Obrosovo =

Obrosovo (Russian: Обросово) is the name of several rural localities in Russia:

- Obrosovo, Tver Oblast, a village in Obrosovskoye Rural Settlement of Molokovsky District in Tver Oblast
- Obrosovo, Sokolsky District, Vologda Oblast, a village in Borovetsky Selsoviet of Sokolsky District in Vologda Oblast
- Obrosovo, Vologodsky District, Vologda Oblast, a village in Kubensky Selsoviet of Vologodsky District in Vologda Oblast
