= Ambrož =

Ambrož is Czech and Slovene given name and surname (Czech feminine: Ambrožová), derived from the name Ambrosius. Equivalents include Ambrose (English), Ambros (German), Ambrus (Hungarian), Ambrogio (Italian), Ambroży (Polish) and Amvrosy (Russian). Notable people with the name include:

== Given name ==
- Ambrož Hradecký (died 1439), Czech priest, preacher and political leader
- Jurij Ambrož Kappus (1675–1753), Slovenian politician

== Surname ==
- Berta Ambrož (1944–2003), Slovenian singer
- Filip Ambrož (born 2003), Croatian-Swedish footballer
- Jan Ambrož (born 1954), Czech chess master
- Mihael Ambrož (1808–1864), Slovenian politician

== See also ==
- Abrasimov/Abrosimov, Abroskin, Ambro, Ambrogi, Ambrogetti, Ambrogio, Ambroise, Ambros, Ambrose (given name, surname), Ambrosetti, Ambrosi, Ambrosia, Ambrosini, Ambrosio / D'Ambrosio, Ambrosius, Ambrosoli, Ambroz, Ambrož, Ambroziak, Ambrožič, Ambroziewicz, Ambroży, Ambrus, Amvrosy, Amvrosimov
- Ambrož pod Krvavcem, a village in Slovenia
