= Ambrogi =

Ambrogi is a surname. Notable people with the surname include:

- Arturo Ambrogi (1874–1936), Salvadoran writer and journalist
- Domenico Ambrogi (c. 1600–after 1678), Italian painter
- Marius Ambrogi (1895–1971), French World War I flying ace

== See also ==
- Abrasimov/Abrosimov, Abroskin, Ambro, Ambrogi, Ambrogetti, Ambrogio, Ambroise, Ambros, Ambrose (given name, surname), Ambrosetti, Ambrosi, Ambrosia, Ambrosini, Ambrosio / D'Ambrosio, Ambrosius, Ambrosoli, Ambroz, Ambrož, Ambroziak, Ambrožič, Ambroziewicz, Ambroży, Ambrus, Amvrosy
