= Etchemendy =

Etchemendy is a surname of Basque origin meaning 'the mountain with a house(s) on it'. Notable people with the surname include:

- John Etchemendy (born 1952), American logician
- Nancy Etchemendy (born 1952), American writer
- Pascale Etchemendy (born 1966), French tennis player

== See also ==
- Echemendia
