= Ambrosov =

Ambrosov (Russian: Амбро́сов; masculine) or Ambrosova (Амбро́сова; feminine) is a Russian last name, a variant of Abrosimov.

== See also ==
- Zuzana Ambrošová, piano player performing a piece by Sylvie Bodorová, Czech composer
- Ambrosovo, a rural locality (a village) in Yuryevetsky District of Ivanovo Oblast, Russia
- Katya Ambrosova, Russian-American dancer.
