= Ambrósio Leitão da Cunha =

Brazilian politician

Baron of Mamoré
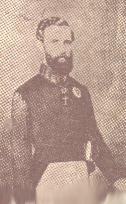

Senator of the Empire of Brazil
- In office 1870–1889
- Monarch: Pedro II

President of Pará
- In office 24 May 1858 – 7 December 1858
- Preceded by: João da Silva Carrão
- Succeeded by: Manuel de Frias e Vasconcelos

President of Paraíba
- In office 4 June 1859 – 13 April 1860
- Preceded by: Henrique de Beaurepaire-Rohan
- Succeeded by: Luís Antônio da Silva Nunes

President of Pernambuco
- In office 23 April 1860 – 1861
- Preceded by: Luís Barbalho Moniz Fiúza
- Succeeded by: Antônio Marcelino Nunes Gonçalves

President of Maranhão
- In office 13 June 1863 – 24 November 1863
- Preceded by: João Pedro Dias Vieira
- Succeeded by: Miguel Joaquim Aires do Nascimento
- In office 3 October 1864 – 23 April 1865
- Preceded by: Miguel Joaquim Aires do Nascimento
- Succeeded by: José Caetano Vaz Júnior
- In office 4 September 1868 – 18 October 1868
- Preceded by: Manuel Cerqueira Pinto
- Succeeded by: Manuel Cerqueira Pinto
- In office 25 October 1868 – 4 April 1869
- Preceded by: Manuel Cerqueira Pinto
- Succeeded by: José da Silva Maia

President of Bahia
- In office 25 November 1866 – 19 March 1867
- Preceded by: Manuel Pinto de Sousa Dantas
- Succeeded by: João Ferreira de Moura

Minister of Affairs of the Empire
- In office 1885–1885
- Preceded by: João Florentino Meira de Vasconcelos
- Succeeded by: José Fernandes da Costa Pereira Júnior

Personal details
- Born: 18 August 1825 Belém, Brazil
- Died: 5 December 1898 (aged 73)
- Occupation: Politician, lawyer

Ambrósio Leitão da Cunha, the Baron of Mamoré (21 August 1825 – 5 December 1898) was a Brazilian lawyer and politician who served as a senator in the Empire of Brazil from 1870 to 1889. He also served as president of the provinces of Pará, Paraíba, Pernambuco, Maranhão, and Bahia.

== Biography ==
His parents were Gaspar Leitão da Cunha and Maria Antônia da Fonseca Zuzarte, descendants of Portuguese families who settled in the Captaincy of Grão-Pará in the second half of the 18th century. Gaspar Leitão was a Major in the Army, of the 2nd Regiment of the 1st Line, born in Pará, and son of frigate captain Manoel Gonçalves da Cunha, who was transferred in 1780 from Mazagão in Africa to Mazagão in the present-day state of Amapá.

Ambrósio served as a judge, police chief, appellate judge, provincial and general deputy, president of a province, and senator of the Empire of Brazil from 1870 to 1889. During his youth, he studied humanities in Lisbon. In 1839, he was appointed clerk of the provincial treasury of Pará, subsequently holding the positions of Inspector of the Treasury and Director of Public Instruction. He began his law studies at the Faculty of Law of Olinda and later transferred to the São Paulo, completing his bachelor's degree in 1845.
