= Sant'Ambrogio =

Sant'Ambrogio may refer to the following entities in Italy:

- Basilica of Sant'Ambrogio, a church in the Milan
- Sant'Ambrogio, Florence, a Roman Catholic church in Florence
- Sant'Ambrogio di Torino, a municipality in the Turin
- Sant'Ambrogio di Valpolicella, a municipality in Verona, Veneto
- Sant'Ambrogio sul Garigliano, a municipality in Frosinone, Lazio

== See also ==
- Ambrogio
- Saint-Ambroise (disambiguation)
- Saint Ambrose
