= 2012 FIVB Volleyball Men's Club World Championship squads =

This article shows all participating team squads at the 2012 FIVB Volleyball Men's Club World Championship, held from 13 to 19 October 2012 in Doha, Qatar.

== Pool A ==
=== Trentino Diatec ===
- Head Coach: (Bulgaria) Radostin Stoychev

Number	Player
1	(Bulgaria) Matey Kaziyski (c)
2	(Italy) Giacomo Sintini
3	(Italy) Emanuele Birarelli
5	(Italy) Osmany Juantorena
7	(Brazil) Raphael Vieira de Oliveira
9	(Bulgaria) Nikolay Uchikov
10	(Italy) Filippo Lanza
12	(Greece) Mitar Tzourits
13	(Italy) Massimo Colaci (L)
14	(Czech Republic) Jan Štokr
16	(Italy) Andrea Bari (L)
17	(Italy) Matteo Burgsthaler

=== Sada Cruzeiro ===
- Head Coach: (Argentina) Marcelo Méndez

Number	Player
2	(Brazil) Daniel Gramignoli
4	(Brazil) Douglas Cordeiro
5	(Brazil) Maurício Silva
6	(Brazil) Túlio Nogueira
7	(Brazil) William Arjona (c)
8	(Brazil) Wallace de Souza
9	(Cuba) Yoandry Leal
10	(Cuba) Yadier Sánchez
11	(Brazil) Marcus Vinícius Acácio
14	(Brazil) Rogério Silva
17	(Brazil) Sérgio Nogueira (L)
18	(Brazil) Filipe Ferraz

=== Al-Rayyan ===
- Head Coach: (Croatia) Igor Arbutina

Number	Player
1	(Qatar) Osamn Hassn Ajab
2	(Qatar) Ali Hassan Asadi
5	(Bulgaria) Georgi Bratoev
7	(Qatar) Suliman Saeed Saad (L)
8	(Qatar) Mohamed Al-Oui
9	(Qatar) Ali Ishaq Sherwel
10	(Bulgaria) Valentin Bratoev
11	(Brazil) Rodrigão
12	(United Arab Emirates) Mubarak Dahi Waleed
13	(Finland) Mikko Oivanen
16	(United States) David Lee
18	(Cuba) Sirianis Méndez

=== Tigres de la UANL ===
- Head Coach: (Mexico) Jorge Azair

Number	Player
1	(Mexico) Jesús Valdés Loredo
2	(Mexico) Edgar Herrera
5	(Mexico) Jesús Rangel (L)
6	(Mexico) Richar Lazcano
7	(Mexico) Jorge Barajas
10	(Mexico) Néstor Orellana
11	(Mexico) Guillermo Romero
12	(Mexico) Ismael Guerrero
13	(Mexico) Samuel Córdoba (c)
14	(Mexico) Tomás Aguilera
15	(Mexico) Juan Virgen
18	(Mexico) Óscar Aguirre

== Pool B ==
=== Zenit Kazan ===
- Head Coach: (Russia) Vladimir Alekno

Number	Player
1	(United States) Matt Anderson
3	(Russia) Nikolay Apalikov
4	(Russia) Ivan Demakov
5	(Italy) Valerio Vermiglio
6	(Russia) Evgeny Sivozhelez
8	(Russia) Igor Kolodinsky
9	(Russia) Alexey Cheremisin
10	(Russia) Yury Berezhko
14	(Russia) Alexander Abrosimov
15	(Russia) Aleksey Obmochaev (L)
17	(Russia) Vladislav Babichev
18	(Russia) Maxim Mikhaylov (c)

=== PGE Skra Bełchatów ===
- Head Coach: (Poland) Jacek Nawrocki

Number	Player
2	(Poland) Mariusz Wlazły (c)
4	(Poland) Daniel Pliński
5	(Netherlands) Wytze Kooistra
6	(Poland) Karol Kłos
8	(Serbia) Konstantin Čupković
9	(Slovenia) Dejan Vinčić
12	(Poland) Paweł Woicki
13	(Poland) Michał Winiarski
14	(Serbia) Aleksandar Atanasijević
16	(Poland) Paweł Zatorski (L)
17	(Cuba) Yosleyder Cala
18	(Poland) Michał Bąkiewicz

=== Zamalek ===
- Head Coach: (Egypt) Mohamed Ellakany

Number	Player
1	(Egypt) Saleh Youssef
2	(Egypt) Ahmed Ellakany
4	(Egypt) Mohamed Khattab
5	(Egypt) Ahmed Kabary
6	(Egypt) Wael Alaydy (L)
7	(Egypt) Ashraf Abouelhassan (c)
10	(Egypt) Mohamed El Daabousi
11	(Egypt) Ahmed Afifi
13	(Egypt) Mohamed Badawy
15	(Egypt) Ahmed Abdelaal
16	(Egypt) Mohamed Seif Elnasr
17	(Egypt) Reda Haikal

=== Al-Arabi ===
- Head Coach: (Brazil) Mauro Grasso

Number	Player
1	(Qatar) Renan Ribeiro
2	(Qatar) Mohamed Jumah
3	(Qatar) Saeed Al-Jamaani (c)
4	(Qatar) Al-Soud Abdul Aziz
6	(Germany) Christian Pampel
7	(United States) Richard Lambourne (L)
9	(Saudi Arabia) Ahmed Al Bakhet
10	(Italy) Dante Boninfante
14	(Finland) Matti Oivanen
15	(Qatar) Leonardo Rangel
16	(Qatar) Mohamed Ibrahim
18	(Qatar) Al-Hitmi Saed
