= Zoltán Ambrus =

Hungarian writer and translator (1861–1932)

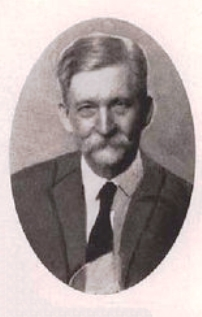
- Born: 22 February 1861; Debrecen, Hungary
- Died: 28 February 1932 (aged 71); Budapest, Hungary
- Spouse: Etelka Benkő (née Adél Blau)

Zoltán Ambrus (22 February 1861 in Debrecen – 28 February 1932 in Budapest) was a Hungarian writer and translator. He completed gymnasium (high school) in Debrecen and Budapest and then studied law in Budapest. At the age of 18, his father died leaving him responsible for his family. He tutored and wrote theater criticism and articles for such publications as Pesti Napló, Fővárosi Lapok, and Budapesti Szemle. In 1885, he moved to Paris where he studied literature at the Collège de France and the Sorbonne. He became a contributor to A Hét upon his return to Pest and wrote a substantial quantity of short stories. In 1900, he became editor of Új Magyar Szemle, and wrote some pieces for Nyugat, as well as serving as director of the National Theater (between 1917 and 1922).

== Work ==
He wrote about the urban setting of Hungary in his work. His novel Midás király (1906) is a key psychological work. He translated a substantial amount of French literature including Flaubert, Cherbuliez, Maupassant, Anatole France, and Balzac.
