= Young blood transfusion =

Experimental therapy

Young blood transfusion is the transfusion of blood from a young person into an older one, with the intention to produce a health benefit. The efficacy and safety of young blood transfusions for anti-aging purposes remain a subject of debate in the scientific community, with limited clinical evidence in humans. There are also concerns of harm. While some preclinical studies on animals suggest potential benefits, there is a lack of robust clinical evidence to support its use in humans. The U.S. Food and Drug Administration, in 2019, cautioned "consumers against receiving young donor plasma infusions" stating that they are an "unproven treatment".

== Research ==
Experiments beginning in the 1950s in the Cornell University lab of Clive McCay on pairs of old and young rodents placed into parabiosis provided some evidence, albeit limited and "largely anecdotal", that the circulation of blood from young mice increased both the longevity and the tissue function of old mice. After decades in which relatively little work on parabiosis in aging was done, the work was revived by researchers at Stanford University and the University of California at Berkeley. Parabiosis experiments are difficult to generalize, as the circulatory systems of the mice are fully joined and it is unclear whether the benefits come from the sharing of blood or the older mouse's access to the younger mouse's organs.

A study conducted at UC Berkeley found that when delivered alone, blood from older mice was more inhibitory to the regenerative capacities of younger mice than blood from younger mice was beneficial to older ones, and that the benefit of young blood in older mice was less than had been observed when older mice were subjected to parabiosis. Replacing plasma of old mice with saline and albumin from young mice was sufficient to rejuvenate brain, liver, and muscle. A 2020 review of plasma components that change with age identified several candidate anti-aging and pro-aging factors.

In experiments like this, researchers found that some of the parabiosed died quickly (11 out of 69 in one experiment) for reasons the scientists could not explain, but described as possibly some form of immune rejection; most such cases were the young parabiont. Amy Wagers, a researcher who coauthored several mouse studies on young blood transfusion, has said that her papers do not provide a scientific basis for some of the existing human trials.

A review of studies on donor age for whole blood transfusions reported that blood from donors under the age of 20 years, when compared to donors aged 20–60 years, resulted in a modestly higher risk of death in the recipients. However, other studies have found no effect of age. Research on blood transfusion outcomes has been complicated by the lack of careful characterization of the transfusion products that have been used in clinical trials; studies had focused on how storage methods and duration might affect blood, but not on the differences among lots of blood themselves.

Another approach to achieving "younger" blood is to rejuvenate blood-producing stem cells in the bone marrow. A 2023 study reported that the existing rheumatoid arthritis drug anakinra blocked IL-1B in elderly mice and returned those cells to a more youthful state.

== Commercial development ==
In February 2019 the FDA issued a warning about companies offering young blood transfusions stating:

"Simply put, we're concerned that some patients are being preyed upon by unscrupulous actors touting treatments of plasma from young donors as cures and remedies. Such treatments have no proven clinical benefits for the uses for which these clinics are advertising them and are potentially harmful. There are reports of bad actors charging thousands of dollars for infusions that are unproven and not guided by evidence from adequate and well-controlled trials. The promotion of plasma for these unproven purposes could also discourage patients suffering from serious or intractable illnesses from receiving safe and effective treatments that may be available to them."

=== Ambrosia ===
A startup company, Ambrosia, sold "young blood transfusions" for $8,000 from 2016 to 2019, framing it as a clinical trial, to see if such transfusions led to changes in the blood of recipients. By August 2017, 600 people had participated in the trial. The clinical trial had no control arm and so was neither randomized nor blind. As described, whole blood collected by blood banks that had passed its 42-day storage limit was centrifuged to remove cells. Then, the resulting cell-free plasma pooled from several donations was intravenously transfused into recipients. The company was started by Jesse Karmazin, a medical school graduate without a license to practice medicine. David Wright was the licensed doctor overseeing the clinical trial; in his practice he administers intravenous treatments of vitamins and antibiotics for nontraditional purposes and was disciplined by the California Medical Board for the latter in 2015. Jonathan Kimmelman, a bioethicist from McGill University, suggested that Ambrosia was only running this as a trial because they would be unable to get FDA approval to sell the treatment otherwise.

On February 19, 2019, Ambrosia announced it stopped testing the treatment, responding to concerns from the FDA.

=== Alkahest ===
Another company, Alkahest, was founded based on the Stanford rodent studies. As of 2017 it is collaborating with European pharmaceutical company Grifols to create a blood plasma-based experimental biologic drug which they propose to test on people with Alzheimer's.

=== Young Blood Institute ===
An organization called the Young Blood Institute has also run trials; these, however, involved exchange only of blood plasma.

== See also ==
- Adrenochrome
- Bryan Johnson, tech billionaire that attempted the practice as part of "Project Blueprint"
