= Ambroise Yxemerry =

Editor, journalist and writer

Jean Raymond Jacquette (28 September 1917 – 16 February 2013), better known by the pen names of Ambroise Yxemerry and Raymond Jacquet, was a French Polynesian editor and journalist. Under his pseudonym, Jacquette wrote novels and reported for the Courrier des EFO, the first independent newspaper in French Polynesia, which he founded in 1949. Jacquette was born in Paris in September 1917, and died in Coutances in February 2013 at the age of 95.

== Works ==
=== Novels ===
- Marins en campagne, Paris: Debresse, 1941
- Services à la mer, Paris: Debresse, 1941
- Kerfantan la Breton, Paris: Debresse, 1943
- La terre des Gendru, Paris: Colbert, 1944
- On ne choisit pas sa vie, Paris: La Renaissance du Livre, 1946
- Zidzou matelot malgache, Paris: Ariane, 1946
- L'Ange et la Femme, Paris: La Renaissance du Livre, 1946
