= Diego's Hair Salon =

Hairdressing shop in Washington, D.C

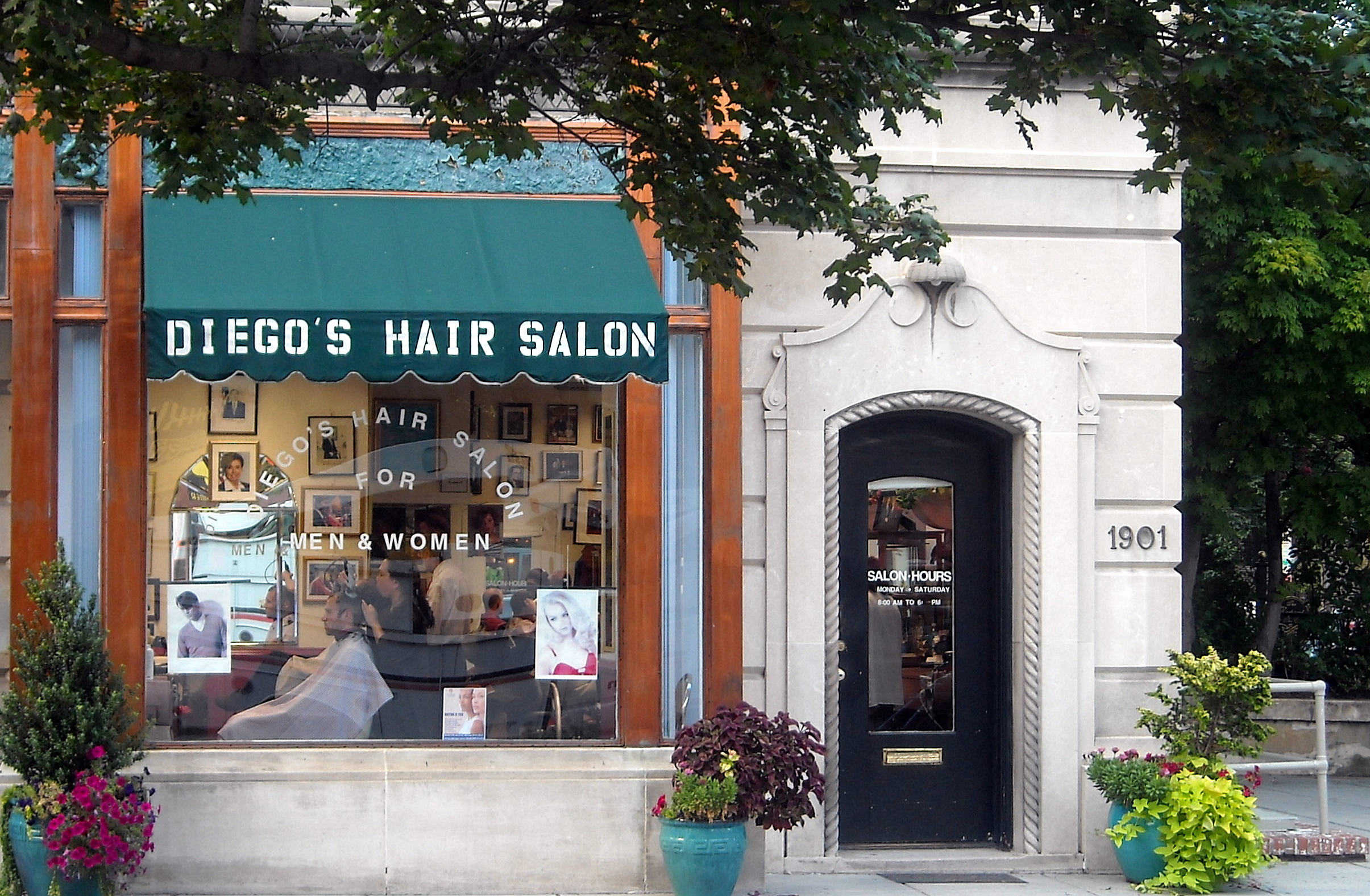
Diego's Hair Salon

Diego's Hair Salon is a hairdressing shop located in the Dupont Circle neighborhood of Washington, D.C., United States. Founded in the 1960s by Italian American Diego D'Ambrosio, the salon has become a neighborhood institution frequented by politicians, religious leaders, diplomats, and Supreme Court Justices.

The City of Washington, D.C., recognized D'Ambrosio's contributions to the community by renaming a nearby street in his honor and by the Italian government, which named him to the Order of the Star of Italian Solidarity. He died in late October 2021 at the age of 87.

== History ==
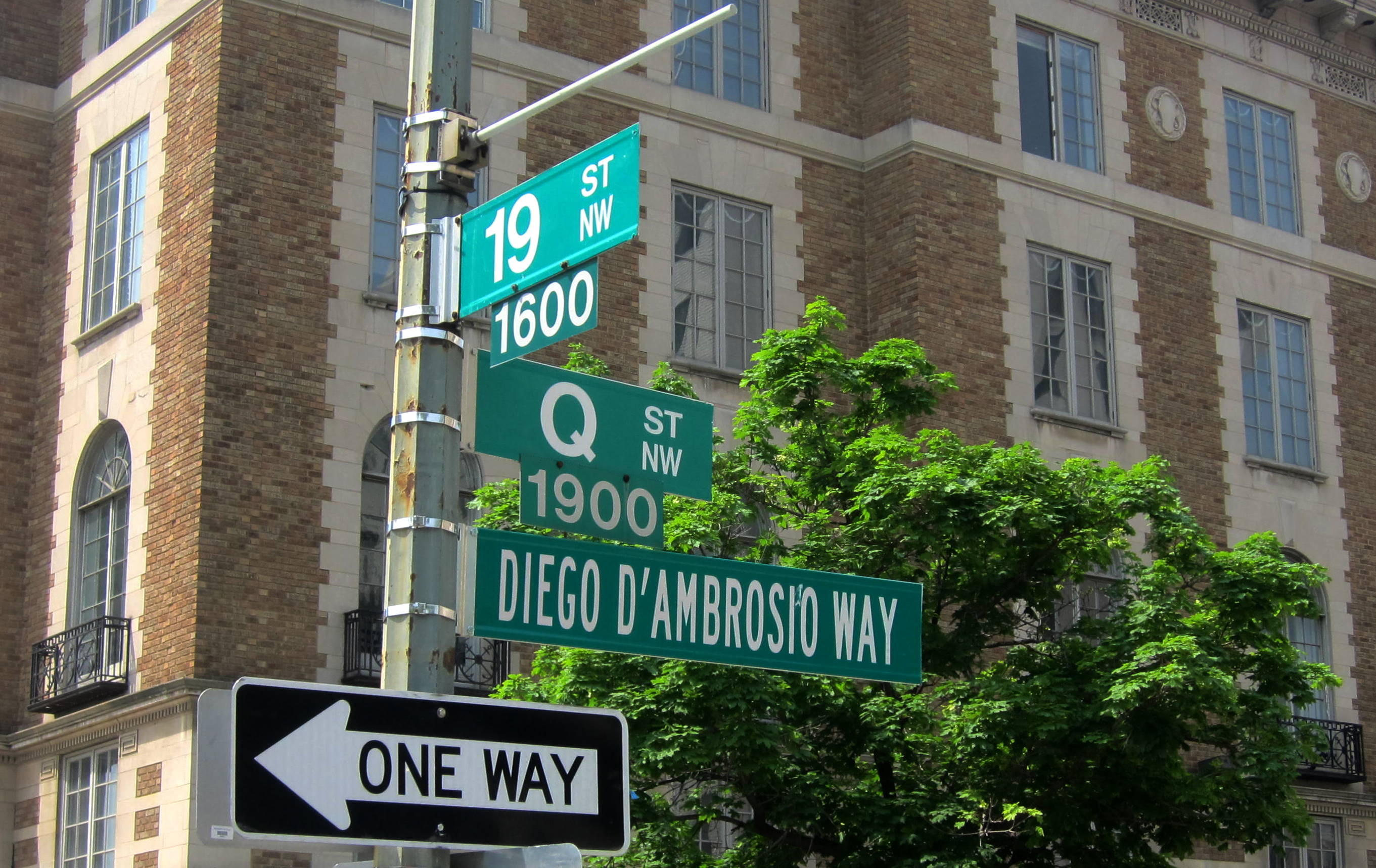
Diego D'Ambrosio Way

Two years after D'Ambrosio emigrated from Italy to the United States in 1961, he began working in his first hair salon. D'Ambrosio opened his own shop in 1965. Around 1980, he moved his business to its current location, The Moorings, a nautical-themed, former apartment building at 1901 Q Street, N.W., in Dupont Circle. The Moorings is an Art Deco-style building designed by architect Horace Peaslee in 1927 and is designated as a contributing property to the Dupont Circle Historic District, listed on the National Register of Historic Places in 1978.

When he moved to The Moorings, D'Ambrosio raised the price of men's haircuts to $20, the same rate he charged for about 35 years until he changed it to $25 in March 2016. Rupert Cornwell of The Independent described Diego's as a "modest and friendly establishment and the photos on its walls capture Washington: unglamorous but beautiful, exuding power yet oddly homey, with history around every corner and great men's shadows on every wall."

=== D'Ambrosio's honors ===
In 2009, D'Ambrosio was awarded the Order of the Star of Italian Solidarity at the Italian Embassy, in recognition of his promotion of his Italian heritage. On April 23, 2010, D.C. Mayor Adrian Fenty joined other local government officials in designating the 1900 block of Q Street, N.W., as Diego D'Ambrosio Way (an alternative street name). The Diego D'Ambrosio Way Designation Act of 2010 "officially recognizes Diego's contributions to District of Columbia residents and the city's business community."

== Famous clientele ==
Diego's customers have included Supreme Court Justices Warren E. Burger and William Rehnquist, Israeli Prime Minister Benjamin Netanyahu, former British Prime Minister John Major, Washington Archbishop Donald Wuerl, Apostolic Nuncio Pietro Sambi, former Italian ambassador Giovanni Castellaneta, Mayor Adrian Fenty, and members of the D.C. Council. By D'Ambrosio's count, he has cut the hair of 75 ambassadors, 17 presidents and prime ministers, and other officials representing a total of 135 countries.
