= Abrosimovo, Vyaznikovsky District, Vladimir Oblast =

Abrosimovo Абросимово
- Village
- Location within Vladimir Oblast Location within Russia
- Coordinates: 56°08′N 41°51′E
- Country: Russia
- Region: Vladimir Oblast
- District: Vyaznikovsky District
- Time zone: UTC+3:00

Abrosimovo (Russian: Абросимово) is a rural locality (a village) in Posyolok Nikologory, Vyaznikovsky District, Vladimir Oblast, Russia. The population was 8 as of 2010.

== Geography ==
Abrosimovo is located 29 km southwest of Vyazniki (the district's administrative centre) by road. Krutye Gorki is the nearest rural locality.
