= Emilio Ambrosini =

Emilio Ambrosini (1850, Trieste, Austrian Empire – December 1, 1912, Vienna, Cisleithania, Austria-Hungary) was an Italian-speaking Austro-Hungarian architect.

== Life ==
Ambrosini finished a shipbuilding school in Trieste. After a few years spent in the Austro-Hungarian Navy, he went to Graz, Austria, where he enrolled in the Technische Hochschule, graduating in 1876. In 1884, he moved to Fiume in the Kingdom of Hungary (now "Rijeka", Croatia) where he bought an atelier and started a construction company. The same year he projected the homeless shelter "Clotilda". Around 1895, he built a building complex in the park of the Vranyczany villa.

Although inspired by late historicism, Emilio embraced the secession at the beginning of the 20th century. Thus he made the Zmajić Palace (intersection of Splitska and Adamićeva in downtown Rijeka) and Jugo House (Studentska Street, Rijeka). His two most important Rijeka works are Rauschel House – Hotel Royal (9 Korzo/10 Adamićeva St, 1906) and Hotel Bristol (12 Krešimirova St, 1908–09), where he leaves an imprint of Otto Wagner and his Viennese style. Ambrosini's Schittar House (1904) is a fine example of Art Nouveau. In 1909, Ambrosini proved his urban planning abilities by projecting the apartment complex Sambalino-Plöch on Potok Street.

In the last years of his life he supported -in a mild way- the Italian irredentism.

Although Ambrosini died in Vienna during his most productive period, he was buried at the Trsat Cemetery in Sušak, an outskirt of Fiume (now Croatia).

An exhibition on Ambrosini's work was staged in the Rijeka City Museum in 2011.

== See also ==
- List of Italian architects
