= Frank Ambrosio =

American philosopher (born 1949)

- Born: 1949 (age 76–77)

Education
- Education: Fordham University (PhD)

Philosophical work
- Era: 21st-century philosophy
- Region: Western philosophy
- Institutions: Georgetown University
- Main interests: contemporary European philosophy

Frank Ambrosio (born 1949) is an American philosopher and Associate Professor Emeritus of Philosophy at Georgetown University. He is known for his works on contemporary European philosophy.

== Books ==
- Dante and Derrida: Face to Face, State University of New York Press, 2007
- The Question of Christian Philosophy Today (ed.), Fordham University Press, 1999
