= Obrosovo, Sokolsky District, Vologda Oblast =

Obrosovo Обросово
- Village
- Location within Vologda Oblast Location within Russia
- Coordinates: 59°28′N 39°59′E
- Country: Russia
- Region: Vologda Oblast
- District: Sokolsky District
- Time zone: UTC+3:00

Obrosovo (Russian: Обросово) is a rural locality (a village) and the administrative center of Borovetskoye Rural Settlement, Sokolsky District, Vologda Oblast, Russia. The population was 328 as of 2002. There are 2 streets.

== Geography ==
Obrosovo is located 10 km northwest of Sokol (the district's administrative centre) by road. Bolshoy Dvor is the nearest rural locality.
