= Ambrosio Martínez Bustos =

Spanish painter

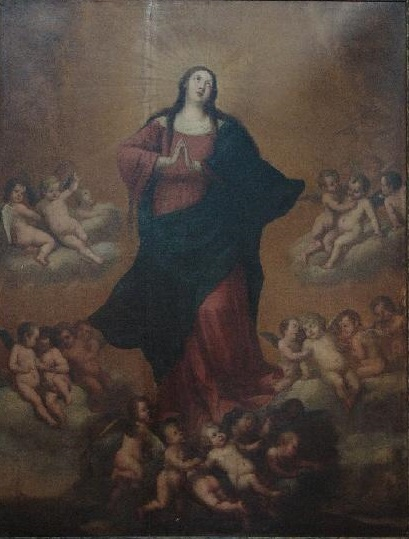
Inmaculada (Immaculate Conception), by Ambrosio Martínez Bustos, Museo de Bellas Artes de Granada

Ambrosio Martínez Bustos (1614-1672) was a Spanish Baroque painter active in Granada.

Born in and resident of Granada, Martínez Bustos was from a wealthy family, and was trained in the studio of Miguel Jerónimo de Cieza. According to his marriage certificate he married on February 8, 1635. Cieza's workshop was one of the busiest and most prestigious in Granada. He was initially influenced by Flemish painting through known prints, as seen in his Inmaculada at the Museo de Bellas Artes de Granada. His specialty was the major theme of the Immaculate Conception, on which he produced several copies (church of St. Andrew, St. Cecilio and St. Scholastica, Museum of Fine Arts, Casa de los Tiros and others). He also is known to have collaborated with Pedro Atanasio Bocanegra and Cieza for the ephemeral decorations for the celebration of Corpus Christi.

== External links and references ==
- Cazorla Garcia, Cristina, "Life of the Virgin in the Granada School of painting. Iconographic study ', Journal of Art and Iconography, FUE, t. XI, No. 22 (2002), p. 207-376.
- Cean Bermudez, Juan Agustín (1800). Historical Dictionary of the most distinguished teachers of the Fine Arts in Spain. Madrid.
- Palomino, Antonio (1988). The pictorial museum optical scale III. The picturesque Spanish Parnassus laureate. Madrid: Aguilar SA Editions. ISBN 84-03-88005-7.
- Pérez Sánchez, Alfonso E. (1992). Baroque Painting in Spain 1600–1750. Madrid: Ediciones Chair. ISBN 84-376-0994-1.
