= Gabriele Ambrosio =

Italian sculptor (1844–1918)

Gabriele Ambrosio (1844 – July 19, 1918) was an Italian sculptor.

He was born and died in Turin, Italy. He trained under Vincenzo Vela in Accademia Albertina and joined the 1866 campaign for Italian independence. He was knighted Cavaliere of the Order of the Crown of Italy. Among his works are:

- Monument to Angelo Brofferio, Turin, 1871
- Monument to Giovanni Battista Bodoni, Saluzzo, 1872
- Monument to Diodata Saluzzo, Saluzzo, 1874
- Monument to Giovanni Garelli, Mondovì, 1875
- Monument to Paul Amilhau, Mondovì, 1875
- Monument to General Ettore Perrone di San Martino, Ivrea
- Monument to Vincenzo Troya, Magliano d'Alba
