= Abrosimovo, Pskov Oblast =

Abrosimovo Абросимово
- Village
- Location within Pskov Oblast Location within Russia
- Coordinates: 56°32′N 28°45′E
- Country: Russia
- Region: Pskov Oblast
- District: Opochetsky District
- Time zone: UTC+3:00

Abrosimovo (Russian: Абросимово) is a rural locality (a village) in Opochetsky District, Pskov Oblast, Russia. The population was 3 as of 2016.

== Geography ==
Abrosimovo is located 24 km south of Opochka (the district's administrative centre) by road. Boldino is the nearest rural locality.
