= Sándor Ambrózy =

Hungarian sculptor

- Born: 7 September 1903; Budapest, Austria-Hungary
- Died: 15 December 1992 (aged 89); Budapest, Hungary
- Occupation: Sculptor

Sándor Ambrózy (7 September 1903 – 15 December 1992) was a Hungarian sculptor. His work was part of the sculpture event in the art competition at the 1936 Summer Olympics.
