= Ambrosius Petruzzy =

Italian sculptor

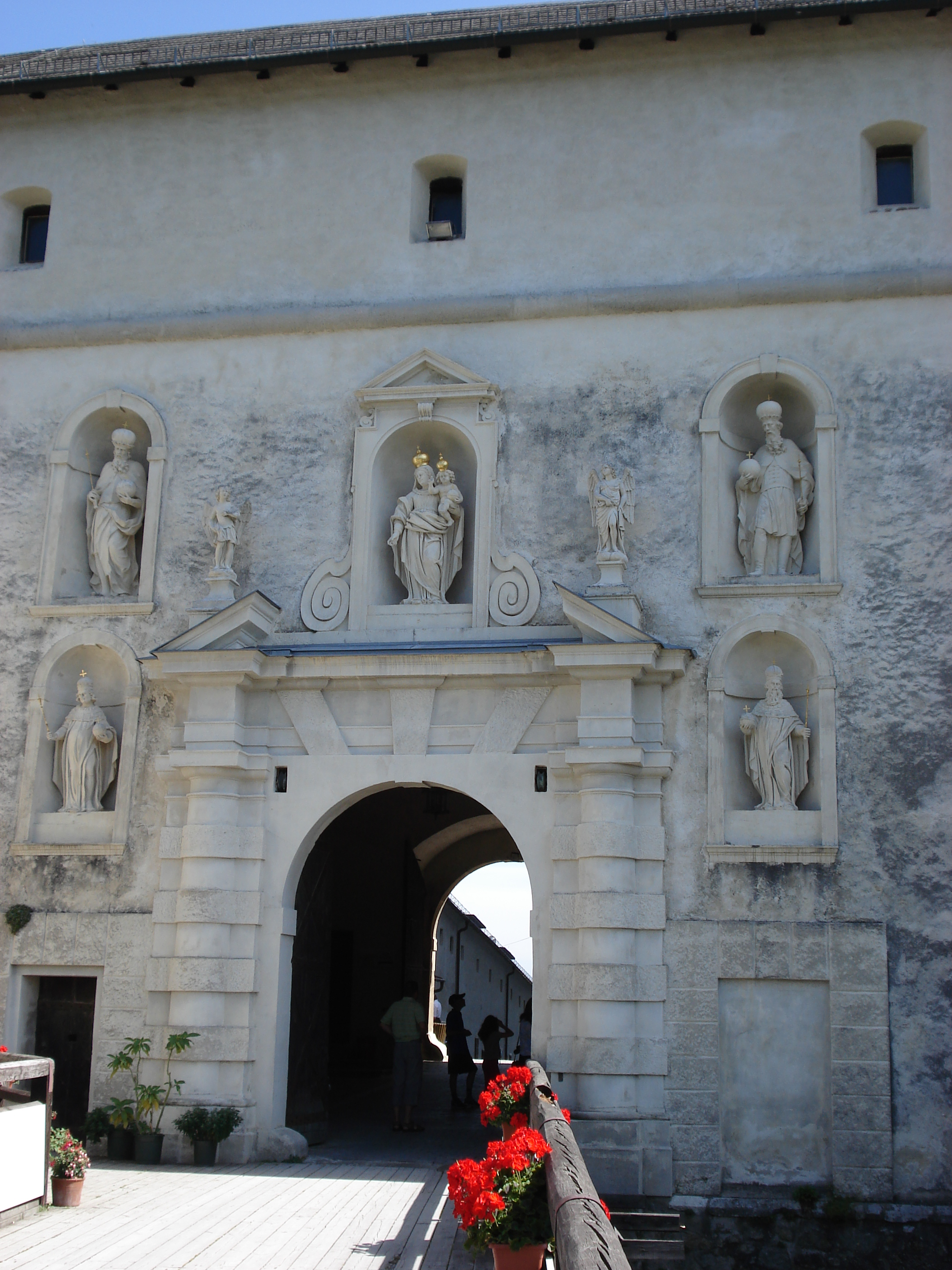
Forchtenstein Castle, main entrance

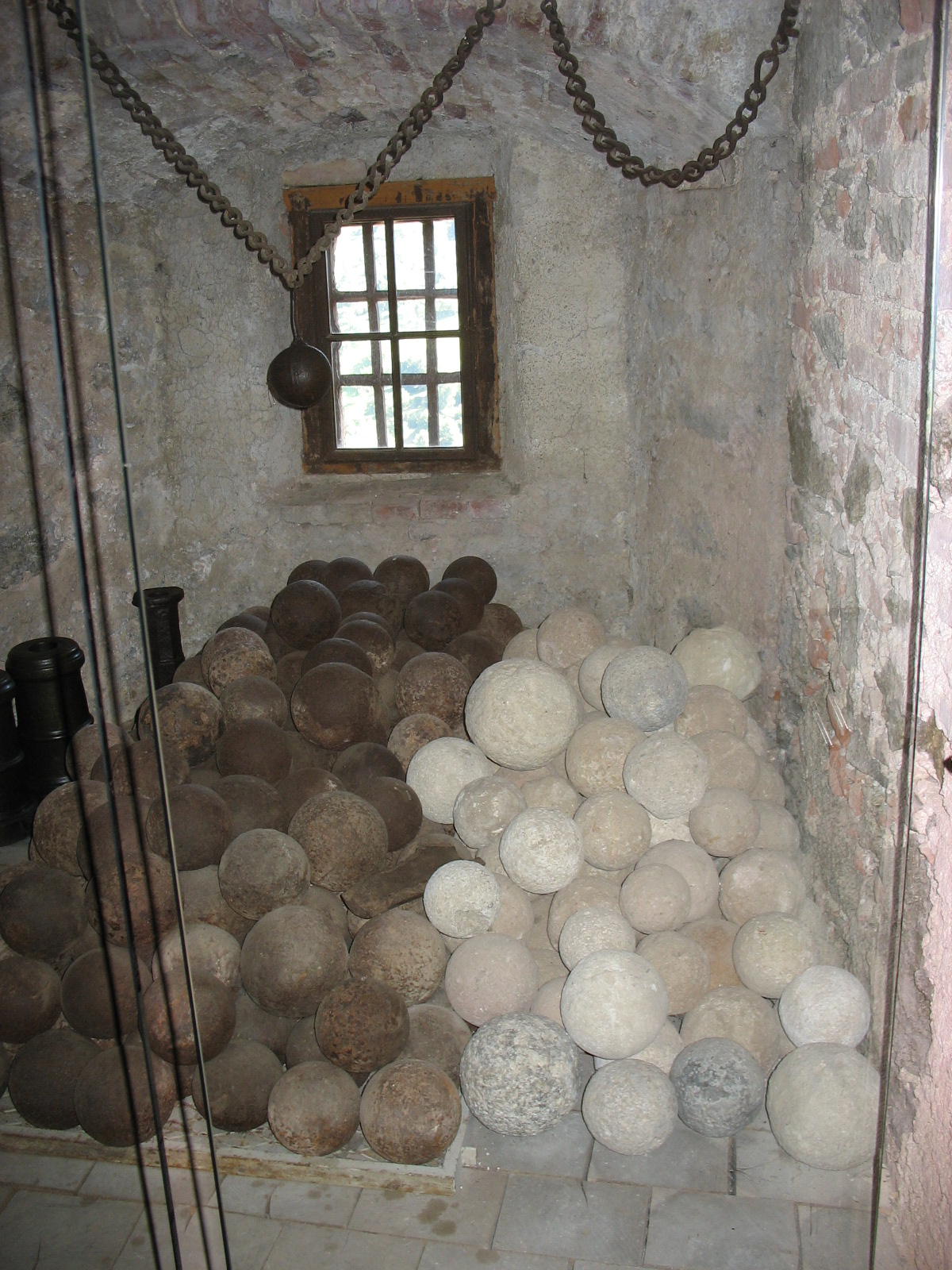
Forchtenstein Castle, cannonballs

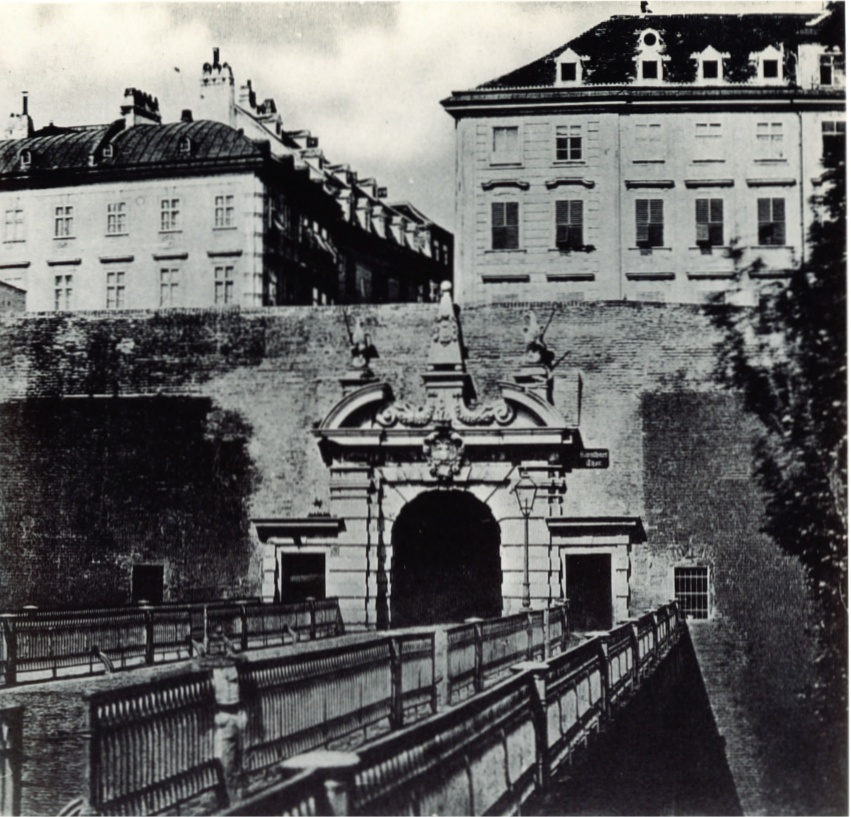
Workshops in front of the Carinthia gate, picture from 1858

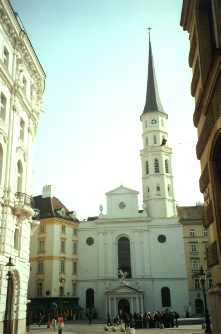
Michael Church

Ambrosius Petruzzy (died 1652 in Kaisersteinbruch, Kingdom of Hungary) was an Italian master stonemason and baroque sculptor.

== Life ==
In December 1640, master Francesco Maderno and his wife Maria sold their house with a garden to master Ambrosius and Lucia Petruzzy. Petruzzy had already been a member of the Brotherhood of Stonemasons for a long time, because in the same year of 1640. He led the stonemason's and bricklayer's Viertellade in the imperial stonepit.

In the 1640s, the Vienna mason's lodge energetically demanded that the Kaisersteinbruch masters separate from the Wiener Neustadt guild and turn to the Viennese one, or else they would have big problems with their Viennese appointments. A letter from the Viennese master stonemason to abbot Michael Schnabel of Abbey Heiligenkreuz as the authority in March 1641 says about that: "...the Heiligenkreuz subject, Ambrosius Petruzzy, who was banished from Klosterneuburg, has now established a factory in front of the Carinthia gate...

=== Master in both Kaisersteinbruch and Vienna ===
The following masters were members of both the Viennese lodge and the Kaisersteinbruch brotherhood at the same time. In the records for November 1644, the fees for Viennese master stonemasons, as well as for journeymen, for the levy of the Neue Kayserliche Freyheiten (New Imperial Liberties) were established: 45 kreutzers for a master, 15 kreutzers for a journeyman. Thus it follow that:

- Pietro Maino Maderno paid for himself and four journeymen - 1 florin 45 kreutzers
- Hieronymus Bregno paid for himself and one journeyman (Francesco della Torre) - 1 florin
- Antonius Purisol paid on July 31 for himself and two journeymen - 1 florin 15 kreutzers
- Hans Herstorffer paid on July 31 for himself and his three journeymen - 1 florin 30 kreutzers
- Peter Concorz paid for himself and his seven journeymen - 2 florins 30 kreutzers
- Ambrosius Petruzzy paid on September 5 for himself and two journeymen - 1 florin 15 kreutzers

=== Lease of the stonepit ===
In March 1643, Petruzzy wrote a petition to the abbot: "...the administrator desires 20 florins in interest for my small stonepit annually, ... other subjects, who have far larger stonepits, have to pay no more than 2 florins 30 kreutzers..." The abbot decided that he would have to pay 15 reichstaler every year or to give him a nice doorframe (which amounted to half).

=== Order for the Michael Church in Vienna ===
In May 1644, the Viennese lodge decided in the conflict between the masters Ambrosius Petruzzy and Antonius Purisol, both of Kaisersteinbruch, that only master Petruzzy should remain in the stonemason works of St. Michael's Church. Henceforward, one master would not be permitted to have two works, nor would two masters be allowed in one work.

In October 1644, the Viennese lodge announced that master stonemason Giacomo Provino (Jacopo Provin) from the Spital am Pyhrn monastery requested sending his son Andreas Provin for the next three years as an apprentice to master stonemason Ambrosius Petruzzy, citizen of Vienna. He had previously learned three and a half years from himself, but due to weakness of the body he is sure to pass away.

Ambrosius Petruzzy died in 1652, leaving debts; thus the whole stonepit was handed over to his brother Domenicus Petruzzy, who paid the debts.

== Works ==
- 1630–1634: Forchtenstein Castle, large commission for three Kaisersteinbruch masters, Ambrosius Petruzzy, Pietro Maino Maderno and Mathias Lorentisch. Stone for main portals, fountain, cannonballs, etc. Supplies of the prepared stone drawn in large stone carts by six oxen,
- 1640: Klosterneuburg,
- 1641: at the Carinthia Gate of the Viennese city wall,
- 1644: St. Michael's Church in Vienna, stonemason work, vespers image in the chapel, stairs.

== Literature ==
All references are in German.

- Church of Saint Michael, Vienna, Rechnungsbuch Vesperbildkapelle ab 1639.
- Wiener Stadt- und Landesarchiv, Steinmetzakten, Ereignisprotokolle 1644.
- Archive of Abbey Heiligenkreuz, Register.
- Helmuth Furch, Steinmetzmeister, die in Wien und Kaisersteinbruch tätig waren, Ambrosius Petruzzy. In: Mitteilungen des Museums- und Kulturvereines Kaisersteinbruch, vol. 24, pp. 7–14, February 1993.
- Max Pfister and B. Anderes, Repertorium der Tessiner Künstler. Der vergessene größte Kulturbeitrag der Schweiz an Europa, 2 volumes, 1994.
- Helmuth Furch, Die Viertellade des Steinmetz- und Maurerhandwerkes im kaiserlichen Steinbruch am Leithaberg in ihrer Beziehung zur Wiener Hauptlade, 17.-18. Jh., in IV. Internationales Handwerksgeschichtliches Symposium Veszprém, 9–11 November 1994, ed. by the Hungarian Academy of Sciences, Budapest/Veszprém 1995, pp. 99–102.
- Helmuth Furch, Historisches Lexikon Kaisersteinbruch, 2 vol., Museums- und Kulturverein, Kaisersteinbruch 2002–2004.
