= Stuart Ambrose =

English cricketer

Personal information
- Full name: Stuart Rigby Ambrose
- Born: 11 January 1943 (age 83); Watford, Hertfordshire, England
- Batting: Left-handed

Domestic team information
- Years: Team
- 1969–1981: Hertfordshire

Career statistics
Competition	List A
Matches	4
Runs scored	66
Batting average	16.50
100s/50s	0/0
Top score	27
Catches/stumpings	2/–
- Source: Cricinfo, 7 June 2011

Stuart Rigby Ambrose (born 11 January 1943) is a former English first-class cricketer. Ambrose was a left-handed batsman. He was born in Watford, Hertfordshire.

Ambrose made his debut for Hertfordshire in the 1969 Minor Counties Championship against Cambridgeshire. Ambrose played Minor counties cricket for Hertfordshire from 1969 to 1981, which included 48 Minor Counties Championship matches. He made his List A debut against Durham in the 1974 Gillette Cup. He made 3 further List A appearances for the county, the last coming against Northamptonshire in the 1976 Gillette Cup. In his 4 List A matches, he scored 66 runs at an average of 16.50, with a high score of 27.
