= Ambrogio Frangiolli =

Italian decorator, architect and painter

- Born: 12 April 1798; Milan
- Died: 21 December 1870 (aged 72)
- Occupation: architect

Ambrogio Frangiolli (Milan, 1798–1870) was an Italian decorator, architect and painter.

He studied in Rome and Turin. After winning an architecture contest in the Accademia Albertina, he moved to Rome in 1829, where he studied further in descriptive geometry. In 1833, he returned to Turin and became professor of the Accademia Albertina.

He created his own Scuola di Decorazione (English: School of Decoration) and designed the interiors of numerous famous residences in Rome, Turin, Vienna and Milan.
