= Maria Luisa Ambrosini =

Italian non-fiction writer

Maria Luisa Ambrosini is a non-fiction author.

She and Mary Willis wrote The Secret Archives of the Vatican, published in January 1969 by Little, Brown and Company. Writing in The New York Times, Christian scholar Jaroslav Pelikan wrote, "It is probably the dream of every historian that someday he will discover a cache of hitherto unknown manuscripts that will change our understanding of the past. ... If there are to be further discoveries of this sort, it does not take a dowsing rod to identify the Secret Archives of the Vatican as one of the best places to dig." Kirkus Reviews was less favorable, stating "there is nothing new, and little unexpected, in the collection of historical curiosa which make up this book."

Her work has appeared in Harper's Magazine. She is secretary at Bocconi University.

== Works ==
- Maria Luisa Ambrosini; Mary Willis (1969). The Secret Archives of the Vatican. Arnoldo Mondadori. ISBN 978-0-7607-0125-6. (reprint Barnes & Noble Publishing, 1996, ISBN 978-0-7607-0125-6)
