= Sergei Abrosimov =

Russian footballer

Personal information
- Full name: Sergei Nikolayevich Abrosimov
- Date of birth: 5 August 1977 (age 49)
- Height: 1.86 m (6 ft 1 in)
- Position: Defender

Senior career*
Years	Team	Apps	(Gls)
1994–1996	FC Lada Togliatti	1	(0)
1995	→ FC Lada-d Togliatti (loan)	13	(0)
- * Club domestic league appearances and goals

Sergei Nikolayevich Abrosimov (Russian: Сергей Николаевич Абросимов; born 5 August 1977) is a Russian former football player.

== Club career ==
He made his Russian Premier League debut for FC Lada Togliatti on 6 November 1994 in a game against FC Zhemchuzhina-Kuban Sochi.
