= Néstor Orellana =

Mexican volleyball player (born 1992)

Personal information
- Nationality: Mexican
- Born: 7 January 1992 (age 34)
- Height: 1.90 m (6 ft 3 in)
- Weight: 84 kg (185 lb)
- Spike: 332 cm (131 in)
- Block: 327 cm (129 in)

Volleyball information
- Number: 17

Career
Years	Teams
2014	(Mexico) Tigres UANL

National team
2014	Mexico

Néstor Orellana (born 7 January 1992) is a Mexican male volleyball player. He was part of the Mexico men's national volleyball team at the 2014 FIVB Volleyball Men's World Championship in Poland. He played for Tigres UANL.

He is currently a teacher for the Mechanical and Electric Engineering faculty of the Autonomous University of Nuevo León.

== Clubs ==
- Tigres UANL (2014)
