= Michael Hermann Ambros =

Austrian publisher (1750–1809)

- Born: October 5, 1750; Burgeis (Vintschgau) (Südtirol)
- Died: July 23, 1809 (aged 58); Innsbruck
- Other names: Pseudonym Hans Kaspar
- Known for: Dampfnudel as a writer's reward
- Children: son: Ferdinand Ambros, Officer, later in the Vienna Hofkriegsbuchhalterei; daughter Aloisia Ludovika, singer at the Burgtheater.
- Parents: Christian Ambros, Farmer (father); Maria Mailender from Mals (mother)

Michael Hermann Ambros was an Austrian publisher and Author of Cantastoria.

== Biography ==
Before becoming a journalist, in 1782, Ambros worked as an Italian language master in Vienna and began to edit Bänkellieder (Cantastoria) in Vienna. Until 1787, he edited 11 folios of Bänkellieder speaking of local events in Vienna and are satirizing the cultural struggle of the time, as well as the reforms of Emperor Joseph II.

In 1785 he founded the "Grätzer Zeitung" in Graz. One year later, Ambros set up the liberal "Bauernzeitung", which was shut down in 1795 by the authorities.

Since 1792 he was also a printer and published a variety of other magazines in 1795 and 1796 in Graz, until persecution forced him to retire to Innsbruck, where he ran a coffee house. In May 1798, he was deported from Vienna to his native country of Tyrol because of his highly political speeches made in public places.

In 1799 and again from 1806 to 1809, he took up newspaper editing again.

He died completely impoverished.
