= Jackson Ambroise =

Haitian painter

Jackson Ambroise (born 1952) is a Haitian painter. Born in Milot, Ambroise paints landscapes and scenes of daily Haitian life. His paintings have been on display in Venezuela, France, Suriname, Guadeloupe, and Martinique. Jackson Ambroise is currently married to his wife of 50 years and has 2 daughters and 3 grandchildren. He currently resides in Port Au Prince, the capital of Haiti. Although he doesn't paint as much as he used to, Jackson Ambroise is still an experienced painting whose recent paintings are rare to find.
