= Abele Ambrosini =

Lieutenant in the Royal Italian Army, Kingdom of Italy (1915–1943)

- Born: 11 February 1915; Cercino, Kingdom of Italy
- Died: 21 September 1943 (aged 27–28); Cephalonia, Italian Social Republic
- Military career
- Allegiance: Italy
- Branch: Royal Italian Army
- Rank: Lieutenant
- Unit: 33rd Artillery Regiment "Acqui"
- Conflicts: World War II; Italian campaign (World War II); Massacre of the Acqui Division
- Awards: Gold Medal of Military Valor

Abele Ambrosini (Cercino, 11 February 1915 – Cephalonia, 21 September 1943) was an Italian partisan.

== Biography ==
Called to arms in 1939, Ambrosini was sent to Albania and Greece. During the armistice he was stationed in Cephalonia, acting as Lieutenant of the 33rd Artillery Regiment "Acqui". Captured by the Germans during a firefight, Ambrosini was killed shortly after in the massacre of the Acqui Division

== Awards ==
Ambrosini was posthumously awarded the Gold Medal of Military Valor.

== See also ==
- Massacre of the Acqui Division
