= Ambrogio Donini =

Italian politician and historian (1903–1991)

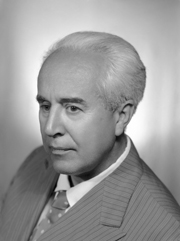
- Ambrogio Donini in 1958

Member of the Senate
- In office 25 June 1953 – 15 May 1963

Personal details
- Born: 8 August 1903 Lanzo Torinese, Kingdom of Italy
- Died: 10 June 1991 (aged 87) Rignano Flaminio, Rome, Italy
- Party: PCI
- Occupation: Historian, essayist, diplomat

Ambrogio Donini (8 August 1903 – 10 June 1991) was an Italian communist politician, diplomat, academic and historian who specialised in history of early Christianity.

== Biography ==
=== Early life ===
He was born in to a family Piedmont family and moved to Rome with his parents. Donini enrolled at the University of Rome. During his studies he became interested in the history of religion as a student of Ernesto Buonaiuti and was involved in leftist politics.

=== Exile and Anti-fascist activity ===
In 1927, Donini joined the Italian Communist Party (PCI). Arrested in 1928 for anti-fascist activities, he escaped to France and later settled in the United States. With a scholarship from Harvard's Giorgio La Piana, he earned a doctorate in theology, lectured on Italian literature at Brown University and Smith College, and married Ukrainian émigré Olga Jahr in 1930, with whom he had a son, Pierluigi, in 1931.

By 1932, he returned to Europe at PCI's request, directing Edizioni di cultura sociale in Brussels, editing the anti-fascist La Voce degli Italiani, and contributing to Lo Stato Operaio in Paris. In 1934 he was sent by the PCI for clandestine missions in Italy by contacting anti-fascist intellectuals. He attended the Seventh Congress of the Communist International in Moscow and the World Congress of Writers in Paris, and broadcast anti-fascist messages from Spain in 1937. In 1938, he organized communist publications among Italian émigrés in New York (Unità del Popolo) and Tunis (Il Giornale). From late 1938 to 1945, Donini lived mainly in New York, countering fascist influence in Italian-American communities alongside the Communist Party USA. Arrested in December 1941 as a suspected Axis sympathizer, he was released after interventions by figures including Eleanor Roosevelt and acquitted. He returned to Italy in 1945 via PCI arrangements.

=== Post-War career ===
Following Italy's liberation in 1945, Donini pursued an academic career. He held the chair of History of Christianity at the University of Rome "La Sapienza" for many years and later taught at the University of Bari. His work critiqued traditional ecclesiastical historiography, viewing Christianity as a product of class struggles in the late Roman Empire and its spread among subaltern social groups. Donini's research emphasized empirical analysis and comparative religion, influencing post-war Italian scholarship on secular religious studies.

He was then proposed as ambassador to Poland by Palmiro Togliatti, after the resignation of Eugenio Reale which was accepted by De Gasperi accepted. His tenure as ambassador lasted just over a year.

Donini was elected to the Chamber of Deputies as a PCI representative in the 1948 general election, serving one term until 1953. He then entered ered the Senate of the Republic, where he was a senator from 1953 to 1958. In Parliament, he advocated for cultural and educational reforms, as well as international peace initiatives.

=== Later life ===
Ambrogio Donini was not re-elected to the Senate in the 1963 general election. Remaining a staunch pro-Soviet figure within the PCI, Donini did not condemn the Warsaw Pact invasion of Czechoslovakia and was eventually ostracised by the party leadership that was gradually moving towards Eurocommunism. He left his teaching position 1971, a few years before his natural term, and retired to his home in Rignano Flaminio to devoted himself to writing his last scholarly works.

== Works ==
- Ippolito di Roma. Polemiche teologiche e controversie disciplinari nella Chiesa di Roma del III secolo, Roma, Libreria di Cultura, 1925.
- Appunti per una storia del pensiero di Dante in rapporto al movimento gioachimita, Cambridge, Harvard University, 1930.
- Le basi sociali del cristianesimo primitivo, Roma, Edizioni dell'Ateneo, 1946.
- I manoscritti ebraici del Mar Morto e le origini del cristianesimo, Roma, Rinascita, 1957.
- Lineamenti di storia delle religioni, Roma, Editori Riuniti, 1959.
- Ernesto Buonaiuti e il modernismo, Bari, Cressati, 1961.
- Lezioni di storia del cristianesimo, vol. I: Le origini, Bari, Adriatica editrice, 1964.
- Storia del cristianesimo, dalle origini a Giustiniano, Milano, Teti Editore, 1976, 1991 ^{3}.
- Enciclopedia delle religioni, Milano, Teti Editore, 1977.
- Lineamenti di storia delle religioni, nuova edizione rifatta, Roma, Editori Riuniti, 1986.
- Sessant'anni di militanza comunista, Milano, Teti Editore, 1988.
- Breve storia delle religioni, Roma, Newton Compton, 1991.
