= Abrosimovo, Kameshkovsky District, Vladimir Oblast =

Abrosimovo Абросимово
- Village
- Location within Vladimir Oblast Location within Russia
- Coordinates: 56°25′N 41°03′E
- Country: Russia
- Region: Vladimir Oblast
- District: Kameshkovsky District
- Time zone: UTC+3:00

Abrosimovo (Russian: Абросимово) is a rural locality (a village) in Bryzgalovskoye Rural Settlement, Kameshkovsky District, Vladimir Oblast, Russia. The population was 23 as of 2010.

== Geography ==
Abrosimovo is located 13 km northeast of Kameshkovo (the district's administrative centre) by road. Shukhurdino is the nearest rural locality.
