= Paul D'Ambrosio =

American novelist

Paul D'Ambrosio is an American journalist and novelist. He is the former executive editor of the Asbury Park Press, and creator of DataUniverse.com, a public records site used by multiple Gannett newspapers. He is a former senior editor at The Marshall Project.

== Education ==
D'Ambrosio graduated from the George Washington University. In 2018, he received an M.A. in journalism and strategic communications from the University of Memphis.

== Career ==
=== Journalism ===
In October 1981, D'Ambrosio joined the Asbury Park Press as a reporter responsible for covering Jackson Township, New Jersey. He was later promoted to an investigations editor, senior regional news strategist, and director of investigations and news director for the newspaper before becoming the executive editor in 2019.

D'Ambrosio works in a field of journalism called computer-assisted reporting, which uses various programs to analyze government data. An unnamed precursor to DataUniverse was launched in the Spring of 2005 by D'Ambrosio, and the full DataUniverse was launched on the Asbury Park Press's website, on December 1, 2006. The site is programmed and maintained by D'Ambrosio. DataUniverse contains more than two dozen databases from crime records to property sale information, and garners about 1 million page views a week. The DataUniverse model has been widely duplicated throughout the Gannett newspaper chain and other news outlets.

As both editor and writer, he has won and shared in the Selden Ring Award for Investigative Reporting, the Farfel Prize for Excellence in Investigative Reporting, the National Headliner awards for Public Service and Series Writing, two Associated Press Managing Editors' awards for Public Service, the Clark Mollenhoff Memorial Award for Investigative Reporting, three National Press Club awards for consumer journalism, and three Brechner Freedom of Information awards.

"Fighting New Jersey's Tax Crush" (2009), which D'Ambrosio edited and co-wrote, was named a finalist for the 2010 Pulitzer Prize for Public Service. He was named executive editor of the Press in February 2019 and departed the company in November 2022. He joined The Marshall Project criminal justice news site as senior editor in April 2023.

== Selected works ==
=== News articles ===
- Vital Signs (1996) (D'Ambrosio, Linsk, McEnry, Becker)
- House of Cards (1997–98) (Asbury Park Press Staff)
- Right to Know Nothing (1999) (D'Ambrosio)
- Profiting from Public Service (2003–2004) (D'Ambrosio and Gannett New Jersey staff)
- Pay to Play and The Power Brokers (2004) (D'Ambrosio, Prado Roberts, and Gannett Staff)
- Fighting New Jersey's Tax Crush (2009) (D'Ambrosio, Mikle, Clurfeld, Bates, Mullen)

=== Novels ===
- Cold Rolled Dead (2007), Down the Shore Publishing Inc. ISBN 978-1-59322-035-8
- Easy Squeezy (2013), Down the Shore Publishing Inc. ISBN 978-1-59322-080-8
