= Ambrosius Beber =

German composer (fl. 1610–1620)

Ambrosius Beber (fl. 1610–1620) was a German composer. Very little is known about his life. He lived and worked in the first part of the 17th century. He is mentioned as a "musician of Naumburg".

The only work that survives is a St. Mark Passion from about 1610.
