= Hermann Ambrosius =

German composer

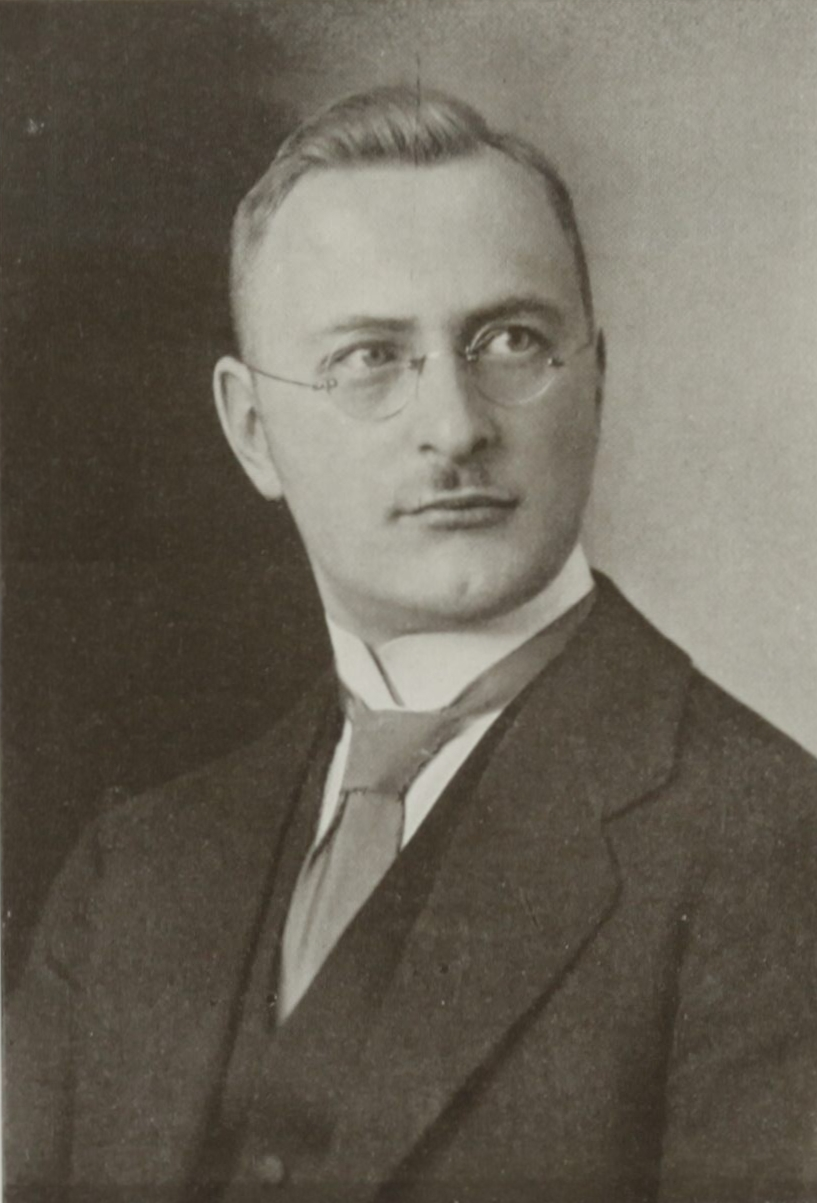
Hermann Ambrosius (before 1926)

Hermann Ambrosius (25 July 1897 – 25 October 1983) was a German composer and music educator.

== Life ==
Born in Hamburg, Ambrosius came via Magdeburg, Berlin and Chemnitz to Leipzig, where he received his musical education. He was a master student of Hans Pfitzner at the Prussian Academy of Arts. From 1925 to 1942, Ambrosius was Tonmeister at the Mitteldeutsche Rundfunk AG and since 1926 teacher at the University of Music and Theatre Leipzig.

After the Machtergreifung by the Nazis, Ambrosius became a member of the NSDAP on 4 March 1933 under the party number 2,994,125. Since 1936 he was also active as Gauobmann Mitte of the Reichsmusikkammer. From 1943 to 1945 he was a teacher at the "Städtische Musikschule für Jugend und Volk" in Leipzig. After he had been drafted into the Wehrmacht for the first time in 1939, he was exempted from military service in 1940, but had to do military service again in 1944 until the end of the Second World War. During the National Socialism period he wrote various cantatas and songs for male choir in conformity with the system in addition to symphonic and concertante music and the Deutschen Landschaftsbildern (1939).

From 1945 Ambrosius worked as a private music teacher, choir leader and freelance artist. After his death, the city of Engen honoured the composer and named a street after him.

Ambrosius left an extensive compositional legacy of over 500 works. Especially his compositions for Zupfmusik are of importance. They had already been the focus of attention of soloists and chamber music ensembles since the 1930s and have enjoyed ever increasing popularity ever since. The "Bund Deutscher Zupfmusiker" expressly promoted his work for this field and made him an honorary member.

Ambrosius died in Enden at the age of 86.

== Work ==
- Symphonies No. 1-12
- 3 piano concertos
- Duo for flute and accordion
- Eggersberger Trio for 3 guitars
- Danza ritmica, 1957
- German Minnesongs and Duets with Orchestra, 1952
- Off hours, four little pieces, 1939
- Party music for string quartet
- Three fugues for wind quintet
- Jesus' suffering and death, 1927
- Balder's death on texts by Edda, op. 61
- Cantata for solos, choir and orchestra, 1953
- Small concert in old style for two guitars, published Bruno Henze, 1953
- Concerto in D minor for soprano, alto, bass recorder and plucked string orchestra, published by Bruno Henze 1951
- Concerto for guitar and orchestra, 1953
- Concerto for violoncello and orchestra
- Concertante Suite IV (A minor) for guitar (1952), published by Bruno Henze 1952
- Mandolin Suite G major for 3 mandolins and guitar
- Passacaglia and Fugue (E minor) for guitar (1952), published by Bruno Henze 1952
- Polifonia vivida, 1957
- Prelude and Molto vivace for guitar, published by Bruno Henze 1963
- Sonata for trombone and piano
- Sonata in F major for horn and piano
- Sonatine G major for violin and guitar, published by Bruno Henze 1964
- Suite I (A major) for guitar (1937), published by Bruno Henze in 1952, recorded in 1952 by Luise Walker on the LP "Guitar-Recital" (Philips N 00640 R)
- Suite II (A major) for guitar (1949), published by Bruno Henze 1952
- Suite III (g minor) for guitar (1951), published by Bruno Henze 1952
- Suite in B minor for flute, oboe, clarinet, horn and bassoon op. 57, published in 1995
- Suite G major for three guitars, published by Bruno Henze 1954
- Suite G major for soprano, baritone and folk instrument orchestra, published by Bruno Henze 1951
- Our Father for mixed choir, 1947

== Music for radio plays ==
- Der Schicksalsweg der Grete Minde by Peter Huchel, director: Hans-Peter Schmiedel, Reichssender Leipzig, 22 June 1939

== Discography ==
- Duo Imbesi Zangarà, Hermann Ambrosius, Complete music for two guitars and concerto, players Carmelo Imbesi and Carmen Zangarà, Stradivarius / Naxos Records, 2024

== Literature ==
- Franz Hirtler: Ambrosius, Hermann, in Die Musik in Geschichte und Gegenwart vol. 15 1973, pp. 175–176
- Reinhard Froese: Archiv Hermann Ambrosius. Joachim Trekel Musikverlag. Hamburg 1997 – Bundesakademie für musikalische Jugendbildung
- Carmelo Imbesi, Carmen Zangarà, Ambrosius Hermann traiettoria storica ed estetica di un compositore tedesco nel XX secolo , Il Fronimo n. 214 April 2026, pp. 26–41
