= Edita Ambrušová =

Slovak writer (1920–2015)

- Born: Edita Kolečányiová; 30 October 1920; Ružomberok, Czechoslovakia
- Died: 9 March 2015 (aged 94); Bratislava, Slovakia
- Resting place: Vrakuňa cemetery
- Education: Academy of Fine Arts Vienna; Slovak University of Technology in Bratislava
- Occupations: Painter, illustrator
- Spouse: Jozef Ambuš
- Children: Johana Ambrušová

Edita Ambrušová (née Kolečányiová; 30 October 1920 – 9 March 2015) was a Slovak painter and illustrator.

Ambušová was born on 30 October 1920 in Ružomberok. She studied painting at the Slovak University of Technology in Bratislava under the supervision of Martin Benka. In 1943 she moved to Vienna where her husband the art historian Jozef Ambruš managed to find a job. In Vienna, she studied at the Academy of Fine Arts. When the fighting got closer to Vienna, the family was evacuated to Windischgarsten and eventually returned to Bratislava. Back home Ambušová picked up book illustrations to support her family. The most well-known are her illustrations produced for the Slovak translation of Of Mice and Men by John Steinbeck.

In her painting, Ambušová focused on monumental religious motives as well as intimate perceptions of her surroundings. She produced stained glass for the St. Emmeram's Cathedral in Nitra as well as a large-scale tapestry depicting the life in Great Moravia. She also produced many depictions of saints from Slovak history in collaboration with her daughter, Johana. A large collection of secular paintings by Ambrušová is on display at the Slovak National Gallery.

Ambrušová died on 9 March 2015 in Bratislava. She is buried at the cemetery in the Vrakuňa burough.
