= Jeffrey Ambroziak =

American cartographer, inventor, and attorney

- Born: Okinawa, Japan
- Education: Princeton University; College of William & Mary
- Occupations: Cartographer; Attorney

Jeffrey Russell Ambroziak (born November 12, 1966) is an American cartographer, inventor, and attorney. He developed the "Ambroziak Infinite Perspective Projection," a technique for creating three-dimensional maps.

Ambroziak was born in Okinawa, Japan, and educated at Princeton University and William & Mary Law School. Prior to law school, Ambroziak worked as a software engineer for Andersen Consulting and Fannie Mae. In 1997, along with his father and brother, he founded Ambroziak Third Dimension Technologies with the purpose of developing geospatial visualization software. Ambroziak co-invented the "Ambroziak Infinite Perspective Projection" (AIPP), a map projection method used for three-dimensional stereo visualization of geographic data. It allows viewers to move their viewpoint about a map while minimizing distortion, and scales the vertical exaggeration depending on the viewer's distance from the map. Three-dimensional maps created with the projection have been used widely, and were featured in a book co-authored by Ambroziak (Infinite Perspectives: Two Thousand Years of Three-Dimensional Mapmaking, Princeton Architectural Press, 1999), and in his exhibitions at institutions such as the Peabody Museum of Natural History.

Ambroziak is a patent attorney specializing in intellectual property matters. He has been employed as an attorney at such companies as Walker Digital.
