= Rachelina Ambrosini =

Italian Catholic laywoman

Venerable Rachelina Ambrosini
- Born: 2 July 1925; Pietradefusi, Avellino, Kingdom of Italy
- Died: 10 March 1941 (aged 15); Rome, Kingdom of Italy
- Resting place: Santa Maria e Sant'Alessio church, Venticano, Italy

Rachelina Ambrosini (2 July 1925 – 10 March 1941) was an Italian Catholic laywoman. Her childhood was marked with great devotion to the Blessed Mother and she was known for her intelligent and gentle disposition to those she came into contact with. But in the 1930s she had a dream in which she was told she would die before she turned sixteen. This came to pass after she died from severe meningitis in 1941.

The cause for her beatification opened in 1958 in Benevento and culminated in mid-2012 after Pope Benedict XVI confirmed her heroic virtue and named her as Venerable.

== Life ==
Rachelina Ambrosini was born in mid-1925 as the sole child born to Doctor Alberto Ambrosini (also a landowner) and Filomena Sordillo in the small Passo di Dentecane village near Pietradefusi in the Avellino province. Her paternal uncle was a priest. Her baptism was celebrated on 7 November 1925.

In 1929 she was in the garden at her house when she saw the Blessed Mother and ran to tell her mother of this: "You know mamma I saw the Madonna!" Marian devotions came from her mother who oversaw her initial religious formation in her childhood. Ambrosini made her First Communion on 12 June 1932. In 1933 she contracted the measles and recovered from this. In school she told her teacher that in her illness she had a vision of Saint Antonio who healed her before telling her that he would guide her to Heaven upon her death which would happen before she turned sixteen.

The girl became distinguished for her great devotion and faith from her childhood and was known to be an outgoing and intelligent child who was gentle and obedient to those around her. In Bari she attended middle school before moving to Rome for her high school studies that the nuns oversaw. In 1936 her father suffered from a grave illness to which his daughter offered her own life in exchange for his; her father soon recovered.

In 1941 she developed purulent otitis - a severe ear infection - coupled with severe meningitis for which she was hospitalized for on 26 February. The adolescent also predicted the date of her death. Her death came in a Roman hospital on 10 March 1941 after having received the Extreme Unction. Her remains were later exhumed from her grave in Campanarello and relocated to the Santa Maria e Sant'Alessio church in Venticano on 28 September 1958.

== Beatification process ==
The beatification process opened in Benevento in December 1958 and closed after its investigations concluded in April 1961; during this time a second process was being held concurrent with the informative process from 1959 until 1960. The formal introduction to the cause came on 13 November 1991 after the Congregation for the Causes of Saints provided the "nihil obstat" (nothing against) with legitimized Ambrosini's posthumous title Servant of God. The Benevento diocese held another investigation from 7 December 1991 until 8 April 1995 with the C.C.S. validating the previous processes in Rome on 16 February 1996 before receiving the Positio dossier in 2001 for assessment.

Theologians discussed and approved the dossier on 19 November 2010 with the cardinal and bishop members of the C.C.S. also approving the cause in their meeting held on 3 April 2012. Pope Benedict XVI titled Ambrosini as Venerable a month later on 10 May after confirming that the teenager had lived a life of heroic virtue.

Her beatification all depends on papal confirmation of a miracle attributed to her intercession. One such case was reported in Benevento where a diocesan process was held to investigate the alleged miracle. The process closed in Benevento on 3 December 2017.

The current postulator for this cause is the Conventual Franciscan friar Raffaele Di Muro.
