= Ambroise =

Norman poet and chronicler

Ambroise, sometimes Ambroise of Normandy, (flourished c. 1190) was a Norman poet and chronicler of the Third Crusade, author of a work called L'Estoire de la guerre sainte, which describes in rhyming Old French verse the adventures of King Richard I of England as a crusader.

== Life ==
The credit for detecting its value belongs to Gaston Paris, although his edition (1897) was partially anticipated by the editors of the Monumenta Germaniae Historica, who published some selections in the twenty-seventh volume of their Scriptores (1885). Ambroise followed Richard I as a noncombatant, and not improbably as a court-minstrel. He speaks as an eyewitness of the king's doings at Messina, in Cyprus, at the siege of Acre, and in the abortive campaign which followed the capture of that city. His work is considered one of the only reliable primary sources on the siege of Cyprus.

== Commentary on his work ==
Ambroise is surprisingly accurate in his chronology; though he did not complete his work before 1195, it is evidently founded upon notes which he had taken in the course of his pilgrimage. He shows no greater political insight than we should expect from his position; but relates what he had seen and heard with a naïve vivacity which compels attention. He is by no means an impartial source: he is prejudiced against the Saracens, against the French, and against all the rivals or enemies of his master, including the Polein party which supported Conrad of Montferrat against Guy of Lusignan. He is rather to be treated as a biographer than as a historian of the Crusade in its broader aspects. Nonetheless, he is an interesting primary source for the events of the years 1190–1192 in the Kingdom of Jerusalem.

Books 2–6 of the Itinerarium Regis Ricardi, a Latin prose narrative of the same events apparently compiled by Richard, a canon of Holy Trinity, London, are closely related to Ambroise's poem. They were formerly sometimes regarded as the first-hand narrative on which Ambroise based his work, but that can no longer be maintained.

=== History of the poem ===
The poem is known to us only through one Vatican manuscript, and long escaped the notice of historians.

== Published edition ==
- Ambroise, L´Estoire de la guerre sainte. Paris, 1897: http://gallica.bnf.fr/ark:/12148/bpt6k6517331f.r
- Ambroise, Itinerarium regis Ricardi. London, 1920: https://archive.org/details/itinerariumregis00richuoft
- Ambroise, The History of the Holy War, translated by Marianne Ailes, Boydell Press, 2003.

== See also ==
- Anglo-Norman literature
- Norman language
