= Václav Bernard Ambrosi =

Czech painter (1723–1806)

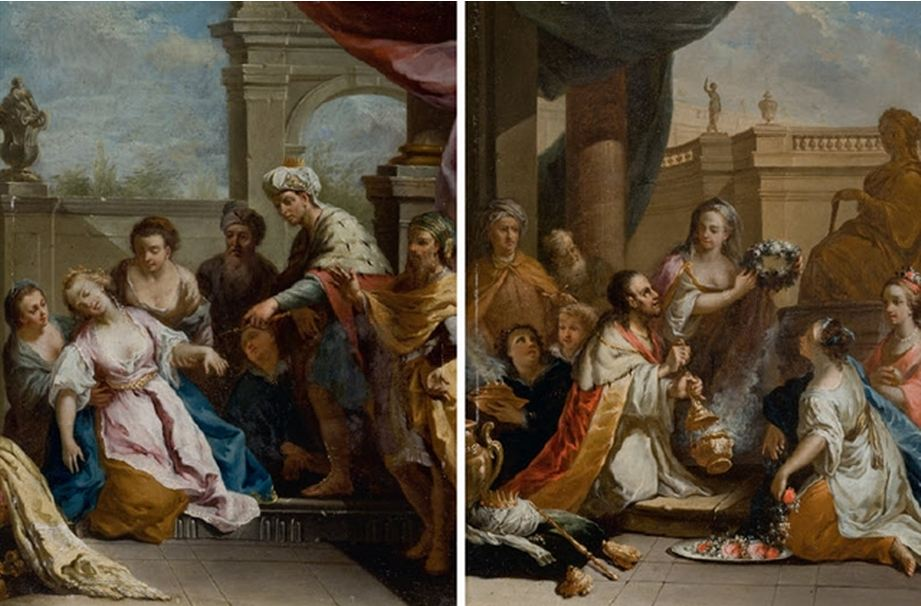
Fainting Esther before Ahasuerus (Left), and Coronation of Esther (Right), both oil on copper, late 18th century

Wenzel Bernhard Ambrozy (2 July 1723 – 26 April 1806) was a Czech painter.

Ambrozy, who was born at Kuttenberg, in Bohemia, in 1723, received instruction in art at Prague from his brother Joseph, who was a miniature painter. He was court painter to Maria Theresa, and the last president of the Painters' Guild at Prague. He painted portraits and altar-pieces in oil, but was also famous for his frescoes, which adorn many of the churches and castles of Prague, and other places in Bohemia. He died in 1806.
