= Ambrosiano (disambiguation) =

Ambrosiano was a national (domestic) Italian express train which connected Rome with Milan.

Ambrosiano may also refer to:

- Banco Ambrosiano, the Italian bank which collapsed in 1982
  - Nuovo Banco Ambrosiano, the Italian bank which replaced the Banco Ambrosiano after its collapse
  - Banco Ambrosiano Veneto, the bank formed in 1989 by merger of Nuovo Banco Ambrosiano and Banca Cattolica del Veneto; in 1998, the latter bank formed the Banca Intesa together with the Cassa di Risparmio delle Provincie Lombarde (Cariplo)
- Premio Ambrosiano, a Group 3 flat horse race in Italy open to Thoroughbreds aged 4 years or older
