= Henrique de Beaurepaire-Rohan, Viscount of Beaurepaire-Rohan =

Brazilian explorer, geographer, soldier and politician

Henrique de Beaurepaire-Rohan
- Viscount of Beaurepaire-Rohan
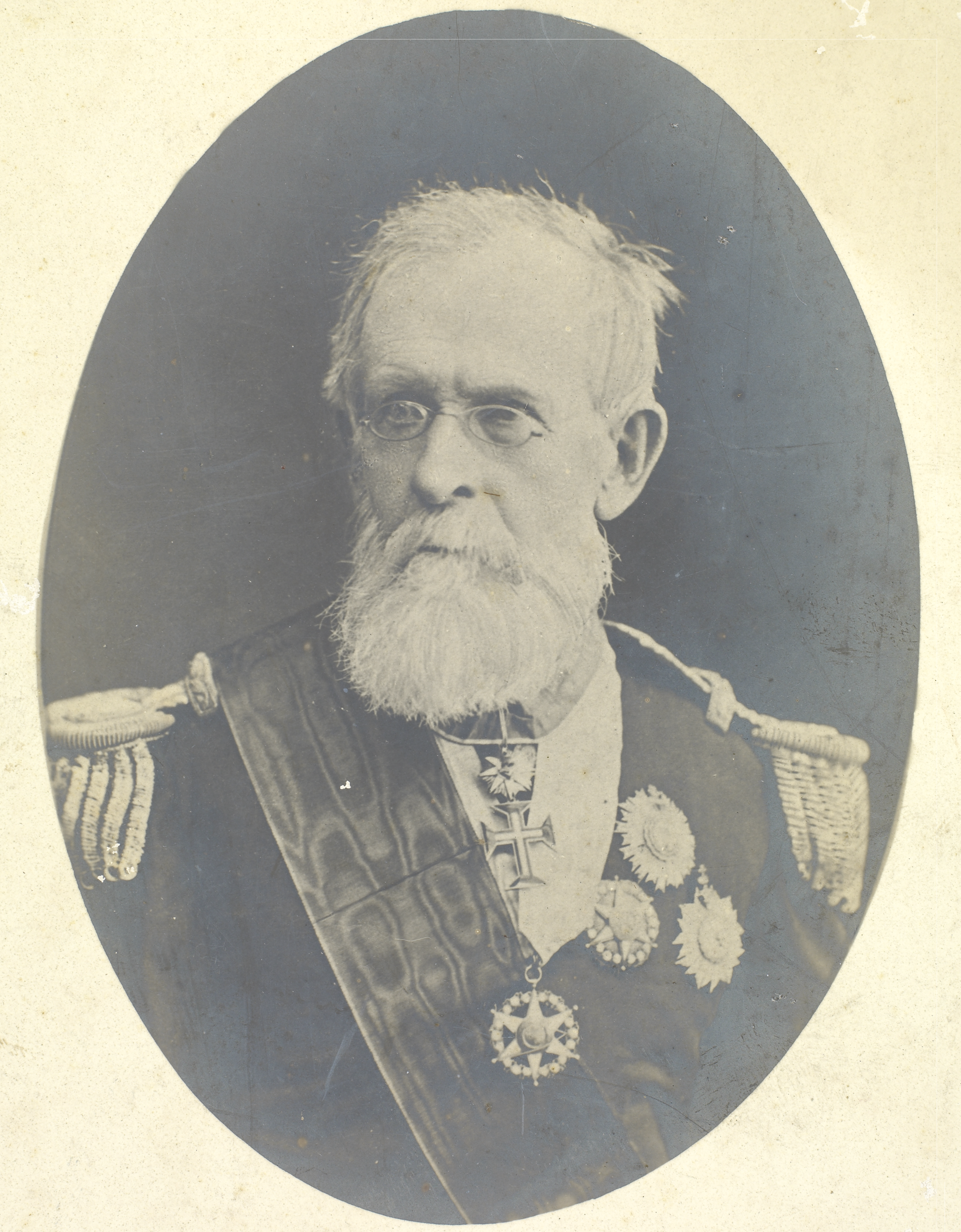
- Born: 12 May 1812; Niterói, Colonial Brazil
- Died: 19 July 1894 (aged 82); Rio de Janeiro, Federal District, Brazil
- Coat of Arms of the Viscount of Beaurepaire-Rohan

Henrique Pedro Carlos de Beaurepaire-Rohan (12 May 1812 – 19 July 1894) was a Brazilian explorer, geographer, soldier and politician.

== Biography ==
He was of French extraction. In 1845 he began the exploration of territory south of Rio de Janeiro. He penetrated into Paraguay. He visited Bonpland at Borja. He subsequently published the results of his exploration as Descripção de uma viagem de Cuyabá ao Rio de Janeiro (Rio de Janeiro, 1846).

He was promoted in 1850 to the rank of major of engineers, and appointed by the Brazilian government to collect statistical information on the interior provinces of the country. He eventually became lieutenant-general in the Brazilian Army. A member of the Brazilian Historic and Geographic Institute, he published in 1877 the important geographical work entitled Etudios acerca da organização da carta geographica e da historia physica e politica do Brazil (1877).
