= Ambrosio Echemendia =

Ambrosio Echemendia (born c. 1843) was an Afro-Cuban slave and poet. He authored poems such as Al Damují and Un incrédulo de mis versos. Accused of being involved in slave rebellions on the island, Cuba's white literary elite were so impressed by his verses that they raised $1000 to set him free in 1865.
