= Ambroise Chevreux =

French Benedictine abbot and martyr

Ambroise Chevreux, O.S.B. (13 February 1728, in Orléans – 2 September 1792, in Paris) was a French Benedictine abbot. He was the last superior general of the Congregation of Saint Maur.

He was elected to serve as a deputy of the clergy to the Estates General of 1789. Along with hundreds of fellow clergy, he was arrested at the end of August 1792 by armed revolutionaries. He and most of his fellow prisoners were murdered in the course of the September Massacres.

Chevreux is among the 190 victims of that event--almost entirely clergy--declared martyrs for the faith and beatified in 1930 by Pope Pius XI.
