= Ambroz =

Ambroz or Ambróz may refer to:

- Ambroz (Madrid), a former administrative neighborhood of Madrid
- Ambroz River, Portugal
- Ambroz Valley, Portugal
- Ambroz (name)
