= Ambrosia (disambiguation) =

Ambrosia is the food (sometimes the drink) of the gods of Greek mythology.

Ambrosia may also refer to:

== Food ==
- Ambrosia (apple), a cultivar
- Ambrosia (fruit salad)

== Arts and entertainment ==
=== Fictional entities ===
- Ambrosia, a farmland town in the videogame Grand Theft Auto VI
- Ambrosia (Ultima), a fictional lost continent in the Ultima series of computer games
- Ambrosia, a fictional alcoholic beverage in the television series Battlestar Galactica
- Ambrosia, a fictional war-torn nation in the imagination of the protagonist in the film Billy Liar
- Ambrosia, a fictional vaccine to the pandemic known as the "Gray Death" in the computer game Deus Ex
- Ambrosia, a fictional lost kingdom in the film Professor Layton and the Eternal Diva
- Ambrosia, a fictional drug in the novel Library of Souls
- Ambrosia Moore, birth name of the fictional character Amber Moore from The Bold and the Beautiful and The Young and the Restless

=== Music ===
- Ambrosia (band), a musical group formed in the Los Angeles area during the early 1970s
  - Ambrosia (album), the debut album of the band
- "Ambrosia", a song by Alesana

== Biology ==
- Ambrosia (plant), a genus of flowering plants in the Asteraceae commonly known as ragweed
- Ambrosia beetle, beetles which live in nutritional symbiosis with ambrosia fungi
- Ambrosia fungi
- Bee pollen, also known as ambrosia or bee bread

== Places ==
- Ambrosia, West Virginia, US, an unincorporated community
- 193 Ambrosia, a main belt asteroid

== In business ==
- Ambrosia (food brand), a UK brand
- Ambrosia Health, a defunct young blood transfusion startup 2016-2019
- Ambrosia Software, an American software company

== Other ==
- Ambrosia (given name)
- Ambrosia (Hyades), a nymph in Greek mythology
- Ambrosia (neuter plural), certain festivals in honour of Dionysus
