= Abrasimov =

Abrasimov (Russian: Абра́симов; masculine) or Abrasimova (Абра́симова; feminine) is a Russian last name, a variant of Abrosimov. The following people bear this last name:

- Pyotr Abrasimov, Soviet Ambassador to the People's Republic of Poland in 1957–1961 and to the Republic of France in 1971–1973

== See also ==
- Template:Ambros
