= Jani Allan =

South African journalist, columnist, writer and broadcaster (1952–2023)

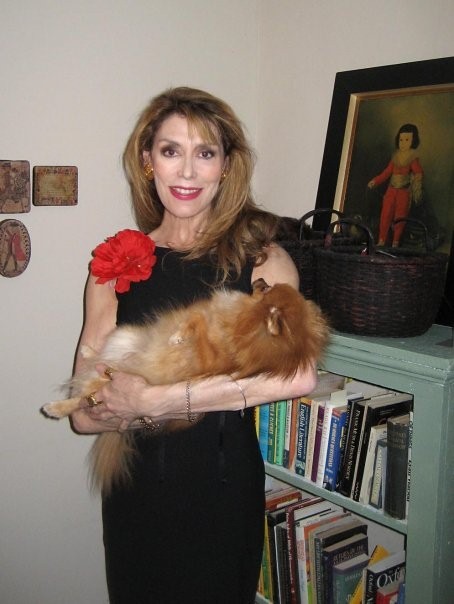
- Allan in 2010
- Born: 11 September 1952; Union of South Africa (now South Africa)
- Died: 25 July 2023 (aged 70); Newtown, Bucks County, Pennsylvania, U.S.
- Citizenship: South Africa; United States
- Education: University of the Witwatersrand
- Occupations: Journalist, broadcaster, author
- Employers: Sunday Times; Scope; Cape Talk
- Spouses: Gordon Schachat (m. 1982–1984) Dr Peter Kulish (m. 2002–2005)
- Partners: Stan Katz; Mario Oriani-Ambrosini

Jani Allan (11 September 1952 – 25 July 2023) was a South African journalist, columnist, writer, and broadcaster.

In 1980, Allan became a columnist for a centrist newspaper, the Sunday Times, South Africa's most widely circulating weekly newspaper. She published columns including Just Jani, Jani Allan's Week, and Face to Face. In 1987, Allan was the top choice in a newspaper commissioned Gallup poll collecting data on "The most admired person in South Africa". In 2015, Marianne Thamm of the Daily Maverick described Allan as having been "the most influential writer and columnist in the country."

Allan later became the subject of press interest over the nature of her relationship with an interview subject, Eugène Terre'Blanche. Allan denied allegations of an affair and took an injunction out against Terre'Blanche. Allan left South Africa when her apartment was bombed in 1989. Allan sued and won damages from two British publications that repeated the affair allegations. She filed a libel suit against Channel 4 over Nick Broomfield's documentary, The Leader, His Driver and the Driver's Wife. Broomfield denied raising affair allegations and a team of witnesses was flown in from South Africa to support both sides. Allan lost the suit, with the judge declining to state that anyone had lied in court.

After a brief stint working at her newspaper's London bureau, she began writing freelance columns for British publications and published a regular column for Scope. She returned to South Africa in 1996, publishing a sponsored web column and presenting a radio show on Cape Talk. After an extended break she returned to the South African media frame in 2013. In 2014, Allan made headlines around the world after publishing an open letter to accused murderer Oscar Pistorius. Jacana Media published Allan's memoirs, Jani Confidential, on 16 March 2015. She continued to write on a freelance basis for South African publications such as Rapport, the Daily Maverick, Fair Lady and The Big Issue South Africa. She also wrote occasionally for The Epoch Times and RT (formerly Russia Today), the Russian broadcaster and news agency. Allan lived in the United States from 2001 until her death from cancer in 2023.

== Early life ==
Allan was adopted by a wealthy British-South African couple, John Murray Allan and Janet Sophia Henning, at the age of one month. Allan's adoptive father, a former sub-editor of the Johannesburg daily The Star, died when she was 18 months old. Her mother was an antiques dealer with a store in Randburg. Allan was raised by Henning and her second husband, Walter Eric-Monteith Fry. The couple fostered three more children, one of whom sexually abused Allan. The family lived in Randburg before moving to Bryanston in Sandton. Allan attended Franklin D. Roosevelt Primary School in Roosevelt Park, Johannesburg, as well as Blairgowrie Primary School in Randburg, where one of her contemporaries was the writer Rian Malan.

Allan later attended Roedean School and graduated from Greenside High School. She was a trained classical pianist, recorded a televised piano concerto as a child, and made her debut with Johannesburg symphony orchestra at the age of 10.

She earned a BA Honours degree in Fine Art at the University of the Witwatersrand where she also obtained an H.E.D. Post-grad Teaching Diploma. British newscaster Michael de Morgan opened the exhibition that was attended by art critic and watercolour artist Richard Cheales.

== Career ==
Prior to becoming a journalist, Allan worked as a photographic model and an English and Art teacher at Wynberg Boys' High School, Bryanston High School, and Sevenoaks Finishing School. In 1975 she was a finalist in the 1975 Miss South Africa competition, and her photographs were published by the Sunday Times. Allan's first published work was a series of classical music reviews for The Citizen.

=== 1980–1989: Sunday Times ===
In 1980, Allan was employed by editor Tertius Myburgh to write a column for the Sunday Times, then the nation's biggest-circulating weekly newspaper. Later, in the main body of the Sunday Times newspaper, she also began publishing Radio Jani, her music reviews. She also had a nightly pop news spot on the David Gresham show on Springbok Radio. In 1986 she began publishing Jani Allan's Week in the main newspaper. She would report on parties hosted by South Africa's elite and continue to interview famous figures.

A year later Allan was in Mauritius covering the Marlin fishing when the Helderberg South African Airways Flight 295 crashed east of the island. Allan and her colleague Geoff Allan were the first journalists at the airport. The Sunday Times published their joint report on the crash that killed everyone on board.

Allan was voted "the most admired person in South Africa" in a Gallup poll commissioned by the Sunday Times in 1987. Daily Maverick writer Marianne Thamm supports this view, describing Allan as "once the most influential writer and columnist in the country."

In 1988, her bosses replaced Jani Allan's Week with "Face to Face", a profile column with greater focus on political subjects. As South Africa became increasingly isolated in the international community because of apartheid, she interviewed political players such as Eugène Terre'Blanche, Winnie Mandela, Denis Worrall, and Mangosuthu Buthelezi.

==== Assassination attempt and emigration ====
Following an assassination attempt on her life in 1989, secret service agents advised her to leave South Africa. She resumed work for the Johannesburg newspaper from their London office. In London, Allan launched a new column for the newspaper titled Jani at Large with the tag-line Jani Allan - Reporting from London. After six weeks in London, Allan returned to work at the Johannesburg office. After a week back at work, Allan was asked to hand in her resignation as she had "become the story". Allan's tenure at the newspaper ended in September 1989.

=== 1990–1996: London ===
By 1990, Allan had become a regular columnist for the South African weekly magazine, Scope, launching the self-titled Jani Allan column from her base in London. At the peak of its success, Scope had the largest circulation of any English-language magazine in South Africa. An article written by Allan on 5 October 1990, volume 25, number 20 in the magazine was presented by the MP Dries Bruwer to the South African parliament in 1991 in support of a legislation issue.

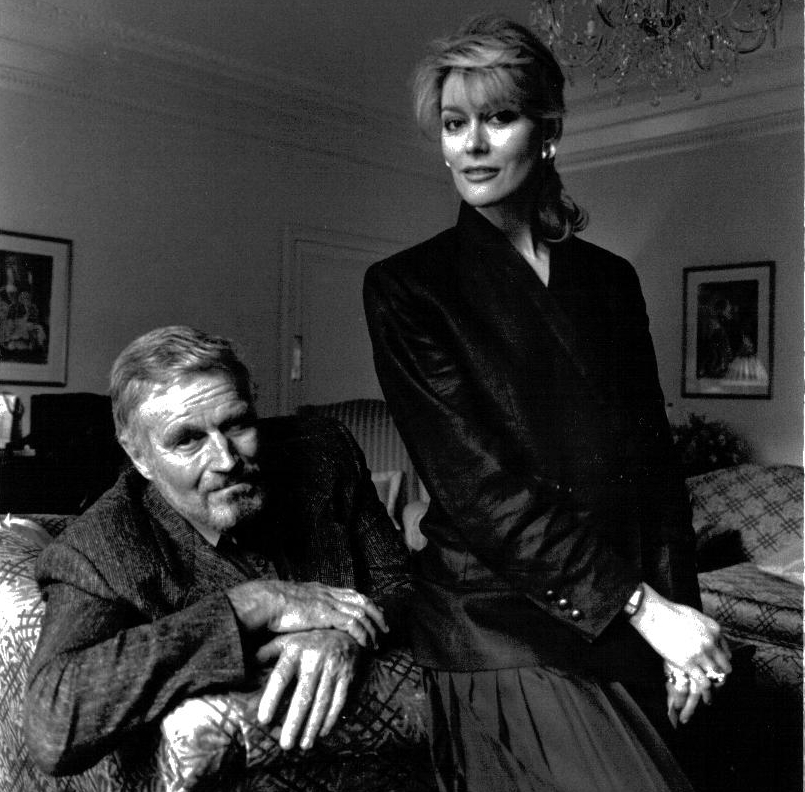
Allan with Charlton Heston at the Hyde Park Hotel in 1990 for a Sunday Times (UK) interview

In 1990, she also worked as an occasional society columnist for the (London) Sunday Times, interviewing personalities such as Charlton Heston for the newspaper and publishing opinion pieces for the newspaper.

Allan later worked for the SABC broadcaster and journalist Cliff Saunders's London press agency and interviewed South African and European political figures such as Jean-Marie Le Pen. Allan was also published by the London Evening Standard where she published reports on George Carman's latest case, in which Carman was defending The People against a libel case taken by Mona Bauwens. She also wrote for The Spectator where she described Carman as "a small bewigged ferret." She published opinion pieces in the Daily Mail and British conservative magazine The Salisbury Review. She did research for and contributed to the anti-fascist magazine Searchlight.

The book that had been embroiled in controversy during the libel case because of its content was titled White Sunset, and had right-wing groups in South Africa as its subject. It was alluded to in 1988 during her association with Terre'Blanche. In 1992 her agent described it to the British media as "a very serious look at the break-up of white society in South Africa" which features "fly-on-the-wall reportage". Several chapters had been seen and cover art had been developed but the project was ultimately not pursued. She had also completed Fast Cars to Ventersdorp, a satirical look at her involvement with Terre'Blanche. It was compared to the style of Tom Sharpe and in the foreword she explained that she had written it because "I want to leave the past behind me." In 1995, she gave a primetime interview to SABC.

=== 1996–2001: return to South Africa ===
Allan's return to South Africa in 1996 was marked by an appearance on the cover of Style magazine and an in-depth interview.

In the same year she took up a position as a host on Cape Talk Radio, a Cape Town-based radio show, and launched her show Jani's World, which aired on Friday evenings between 9 p.m. and midnight. Well-known political and entertainment figures appeared on her show including former SADF Chief turned politician Constand Viljoen, the last Prime Minister of Rhodesia, Ian Smith, and American film actress Faye Dunaway. The Mail & Guardian praised the way in which the "no guts no glory" content creates a refreshing, witty forum".

Soon after establishing the radio show in Cape Town, she was contracted by MWEB to launch the website "CyberJani" with a weekly column, letters page and live chatline. The stated mission of the column was to provide "all the truth that is unfit to print and equally offensive to the left, the right and the centre". Allan tackled a variety of subjects such as Affirmative action and gender issues. She also published a social diary.

In 1998, Allan appeared in the SABC documentary film, Red Jacket to discuss the South Africa-based Russian artist, Vladimir Tretchikoff known for painting the Chinese Girl.

In the same year she made another screen appearance as a Parisian model in the Pieter-Dirk Uys comedy, Going Down Gorgeous.

Allan's radio show, Jani's World, became one of the station's most popular, but attracted controversy in September 1999 when Allan interviewed American right-winger Keith Johnson of the Militia of Montana. Johnson expressed several controversial and offensive opinions. Allan distanced herself from Johnson's views and apologised for the offense caused to Jewish listeners. Due to the negative reaction from individual listeners and from the South African Jewish Board of Deputies, the station was instructed to issue an apology two days later. Allan left the radio station in October 2000. From 2000 to 2001, she was a speechwriter for Buthelezi.

=== 2001–2012: United States ===
Allan moved to Lambertville, New Jersey where she worked as a waitress in relative obscurity for nine years. Between 2004 and 2005, Allan wrote on a freelance basis for titles such as WorldNetDaily. As a personal interest, she also worked as a published astrologer. In 2006, Allan's controversial Terre'Blanche column was republished in the book A Century of Sundays: 100 Years of Breaking News in the Sunday Times. The book included details of the libel case and reproduced reportage about the case.

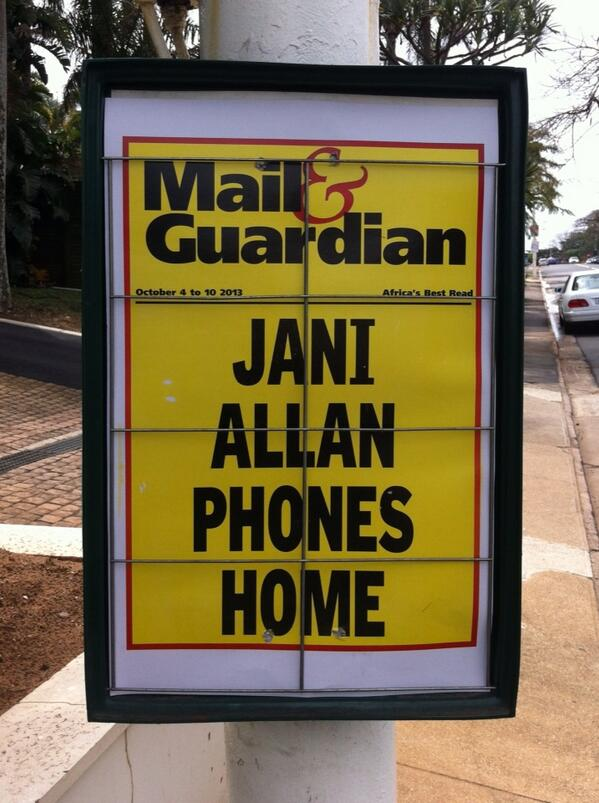
Promotional poster for M&G interview with Allan in October 2013

=== 2013–2023 Jani Confidential and freelance ===
In 2013, Allan was approached as a subject for a magazine article following "yesterday's media icons." Allan joined Twitter and started publishing a new blog titled My Grilling Life. She regularly wrote satirical pieces about her experiences in the restaurant where she once worked. In October 2013, she was the subject of a profile piece by the Mail & Guardian newspaper titled "The Return of Jani Allan". Allan announced to the newspaper a new media project, an interactive biography project about her life and South Africa. In conjunction she launched a new self-titled website.

On 16 October, Allan made a morning radio programme appearance on the Redi Thlabi show, broadcast on Johannesburg's Radio 702 and Cape Town's Cape Talk. On 27 October, an interview with Allan was published in the Business Times section of her former newspaper, the Sunday Times.

In September 2014, Dekat, an upmarket South African lifestyle magazine published in English and Afrikaans, featured a column by Allan. Allan's column was part of the magazine's 1980s edition and is a letter from Allan to her younger self.

In October 2014, the Daily Maverick published Allan's column titled "I refuse to be the poster child of slut-shaming" in which Allan takes issue with comments made by City Press editor Ferial Haffajee. Allan's column was supported by the respected journalist and sexual abuse victims activist, Charlene Smith. Smith described it as an "important, critical piece" and referred to Haffajee's reference as "thoughtless and cruel." Smith continued to describe Allan as "one of South Africa's great writers, and now ... one of South Africa's generations of brave women who speak up loudly and clearly about the harm they experience." Later that month the Afrikaans newspaper, Rapport published an interview with Allan. On 1 January 2015, her former employer the Sunday Times published her hopes for 2015 in a feature that focuses on the South African Twitterati, some of the most popular social media personalities.

In June 2015, the Daily Maverick published Allan's op-ed piece on forgiveness. June also saw the publication of Allan's guest column in The Big Issue South Africa that was marketed as the Just Jani Allan column on the front cover.

In July 2015, Allan became a regular columnist at BizNews. In November 2015, the Daily Maverick published Allan's op-ed piece on feminism in popular culture. Cape Town academic Rhoda Kadalie praised the "well-written" piece "on feminism because it is truly controversial in many ways. Jani deals with the nexus of race, sex, wealth and beauty as pertains to the entertainment industry and her critiques are valid." Allan's column for the special annual edition of the Big Issue South Africa was published in December 2015. That same month, the Daily Maverick published Allan's widely circulated open letter column to her former editor, Tertius Myburgh. Allan wrote the column following the revelation of several spy allegations against Myburgh.

In August 2018, she wrote a cover story for the Weekliks supplement of Rapport and retold her experiences meeting the late Magnus Malan in light of the Bird Island scandal. In October of the same year she wrote a long-form piece for Fair Lady magazine about her second marriage.

In April 2019, Rapport published a guest piece by Allan for the upcoming 2019 South African general election. In the piece, Allan expressed support for Helen Zille and Mangosuthu Buthelezi. In 2020, Allan wrote more regularly for Rapport. The newspaper published Allan's obituary piece for Sol Kerzner and a piece she wrote about COVID-19 in the United States, both cover stories for the Weekliks supplement. She also wrote for the newspaper about Joe Biden sexual assault allegation and Black Lives Matter protests in the United States.

In April 2020, Allan began writing opinion columns for RT (formerly Russia Today), the Russian TV network and news agency.

An interview with Allan and an extract from her memoirs, Jani Confidential was published in the February 2015 edition of Fair Lady. On the weekend of 28–29 March, Jani Confidential was serialized by The Weekend Argus and by Rapport on 29 March 2015.

Serializations were also published by the Sunday Tribune and the Sunday Independent. On 30 March, The Star published an extract from the book.

Allan's memoirs were positively reviewed by Marika Sboros, an ex-Rand Daily Mail reporter now writing for BizNews. "Allan's memoirs are well written, punctuated with her characteristic style: the surgical journalistic precision, creativity, biting wit, bitchiness, and black humour aimed as much at herself as others ... There is an overwhelming unadorned, painful honesty and openness in her version of events and minutiae of the detail, a compelling coherence throughout." Sboros then commended the apolitical nature of the memoirs, citing the honesty of her privileged white upbringing: "She comes across as what she was at the time: not just a babe, but a foetus in the woods of South African apartheid politics."

Radio 702 journalist, Jenny Crws-Williams was also enthusiastic, saying that it "has to be a bestseller: tightly written, moving, funny & horrifying in one great cracker that keeps spilling out surprises." Allan's former Sunday Times colleague Gus Silber described the memoir as "A tragi-karmady of epic proportions. A tale of an epoch. So vividly & elegantly told."

Rebecca Davis, a high-profile columnist at the Daily Maverick described the book as "truly, truly fascinating."

Writing in the Daily Maverick, Marianne Thamm echoed Sboros' sentiment that the affair allegations with Terre'Blanche were untrue. Thamm describes the interview with Terre'Blanche as "misunderstood" and a tool in the "manufactured scandal." She praises the memoir as "searing in its honesty and insight, hilarious and unforgiving." Thamm continues: "It is a portrait of a time and a place, delicately (and often hilariously) captured by a woman who remains undoubtedly once of the most talented writers to emerge from that decade." Thamm concludes that "Allan herself is a survivor, one of those people who, in losing it all, gained herself and more."

Allan's memoir has also been well received in the Afrikaans press. Herman Lategan's book review appeared in Volksblad, Beeld, and Die Burger. Lategan wrote that Allan had been betrayed by "Judas friends" over jealousy and that she had been unfairly treated by a "patriarchal and chauvinistic media". He argues that Allan gave the conservative community ammunition as she was a target as an "outspoken" female figure in the public arena. She does not fit the mould of conservative women in South Africa as she is instead "a cosmopolitan mix of Sandton kugel, Mata Hari, Marlene Dietrich and Camilla Parker Bowles". Lategan describes the memoir as "a journal of treachery, malice and a mirror on South African society".

Len Ashton, Allan's former LifeStyle editor at the Sunday Times, reviewed Jani Confidential for the South African magazine, Noseweek. Ashton writes that Jani Confidential is "a page-turning memoir. Those who knew the columnist in her triumphant previous incarnation will be staggered by this tale of astonishing endurance. And wry humour." Ashton also mirrors other reviews by regarding the affair allegations against "[Allan,] a fascinating woman", as "the humourless PC view."

==== Oscar Pistorius ====
On 14 April 2014, Allan published an open letter to Oscar Pistorius. Allan described the sports star as a "faux hero" and suggested that he had taken acting lessons in preparation for his court appearance. Allan also compared Pistorius with Eugène Terre'Blanche, writing that "Terre’blanche was cut from the same cloth as you, Oscar." Allan continued to criticize Pistorius' lifestyle as "a wasteland filled with expensive toys and recidivist acts."

Allan's column went viral and was republished by the Daily Maverick, The Citizen, Biz News, and other news websites. The column was also reported on by other media titles such as Beeld. Canada's Globe and Mail also reported on the effect of the column, publishing quotes and a link to the full text. The story has also garnered attention in the United States, with reports appearing in the New York Post, Time, UPI, and on Perez Hilton's website.

On 21 April 2014, Fox News broadcast an interview with Allan. Allan reiterated her belief that Pistorius had taken acting lessons and highlighted his alleged relationship with a 19-year-old in that year. A spokesperson for the Pistorius family has denied the claim that Pistorius took acting lessons. Anneliese Burgess, the media manager for the Pistorius family said the claims were "fictitious" and "totally devoid of any truth."

Burgess continued "We deny in the strongest terms the contents of her letter in as far it relates to our client and further deny that our client has undergone any acting lessons or any form of emotional coaching." Allan's claims have been reported internationally, appearing in respected newspapers such as France's Le Figaro, Spain's El País, and Italy's La Stampa.

Allan's piece also affected the case proceedings. Social worker Yvette van Schalkwyk said that she decided to testify in Pistorius' defence after reading what was said about the athlete in the media. Van Schalwyk alluded to Allan's column when she explained her motives: "What upset me was the fact that they said he had acting training, that he just put on a show and just started crying when it was needed."

==== Animal rights advocacy ====
On social media, Allan describes herself as an "animal rights activist." Her recent journalism reflects a concern for animal welfare issues. In November 2013, she focused attention on a controversial photograph of US TV personality and trophy hunter Melissa Bachman posing with a dead lion in South Africa. Allan was vocal about the photograph on social media and published an open letter to Bachman. Allan's piece went viral, garnering over 1 million page views. Later that month, the South African media reported on Allan's criticism of Victor Matfield and Fourie du Preez after the pair published a photo of a zebra they had hunted.

Allan's involvement in animal rights advocacy and journalism began in the 1990s when she was working as a Cape Talk presenter and Mweb columnist. On air she championed the cause of the Lipizzan when a local dressage school faced closure, then educated listeners on the devastating horrors committed against horses as part of gang initiation practices in the Western Cape. She has also discussed the work of the Cape Horse Protection Society and invited representatives onto her show. She also worked for the Domestic Animal Rescue Group.

In Allan's memoir, Jani Confidential, she provides metaphors for the way we treat animals. She highlights the brutality of Marlin fishing, having reported on Marlin fishing events for the Sunday Times. She is also critical of bullfighting, recounting her experience of being invited by an ex-boyfriend to the San Fermin running of the bulls festival in Pamplona.

== Personal life ==
In 1973, Allan was a student at the University of the Witwatersrand when she met her first husband, finance magnate and art collector Gordon Schachat. They married in Mauritius in 1982 and shared a home in Linksfield Ridge, an upscale Jewish area in Johannesburg's northern suburbs. Their two-year marriage ended in divorce in 1984. Allan attributed her burgeoning career as a factor: "I was obsessed with my column. I was intent on becoming the best journalist in the country." They remained friends and Schachat supported Allan's testimony in the 1992 libel suit she brought against Channel 4 in London. Allan told a London court that eight years after their marriage breakup, Schachat was her closest friend and described their union as "the right people at the wrong time."

Allan became a born-again Christian in 1994. She returned to South Africa two years later at the urging of her then-partner, Mario Oriani-Ambrosini, an IFP MP and Italian expatriate.

She emigrated to the United States in 2001. The following year she married Dr. Peter Kulish, an American proponent of biomagnetic therapy. The couple divorced in 2005.

After their divorce, Allan worked as a waitress in New Jersey. In July 2017, Allan wrote a widely circulated column about her financial situation and ageism in the workplace. Her column was republished by BizNews and widely quoted in the South African press. Allan appeared on the front page of both the Sunday Times and Beeld newspaper. Her former newspaper devoted page three to their former columnist. In August, Huisgenoot published a profile on Allan. In response, Allan's fans rallied around her and started a GoFundMe to support Allan financially, raising over US$4000 for the columnist.

=== Death ===
Allan died from cancer in Newtown, Bucks County, Pennsylvania, on 25 July 2023, at the age of 70.

=== Eugène Terre'Blanche and libel case ===
In December 1987, she was asked at an editorial conference to "go and have tea" with the right-wing militant Afrikaner Weerstandsbeweging leader Eugène Terre'Blanche. She later admitted, "I had not heard of him" as she had not been a particularly "political person" and that he was a strange subject for a newspaper she described as "extreme centre". On 31 January 1988, the Sunday Times published Allan's interview with Terre'Blanche for Allan's Face to Face column. In the interview, Allan wrote of her fascination with Terre'Blanche: "Right now I've got to remind myself to breathe ... I'm impaled on the blue flames of his blowtorch eyes."

Despite claiming that she became the "heroine of the newsroom" for her frankness, she later told the Sunday Times journalist Stuart Wavell that she regretted describing Terre'Blanche in these terms, not realising the political veneration that would be read into them. She pointed towards the lack of knowledge she had about Adolf Hitler's personality cult: "It sounds farfetched, but we are only taught South African history at school." Although Wavell identified that the words were not significant compared to her other material; "a perusal of her interviews shows a fondness for such extravagant language." Allan later told a journalist that "From the moment that interview was published, my life was over. It has destroyed my career in South Africa."

Meanwhile, she accompanied the AWB to some of their rallies and reported for her newspaper at the behest of her editor, Tertius Myburgh. Two weeks after 31 January 1988 interview was published, she attended an AWB rally. The rally was also frequented by the world press. She was followed by television crews. Allan later relayed the significance of the episode: "I was an ordinary journalist attending an event with the world press; how come they had footage of me if I hadn't been set up? The cameras were on me the whole time."

Again, she interviewed the AWB leader for the Sunday Times in November 1988, with an interview published by the Sunday after the Wit Wolf (Barend Strydom) massacre in Pretoria. Her words in the January interview were relayed as there was speculation regarding an affair when they were photographed together at the Paardekraal Monument in Krugersdorp on 27 December 1988. Following the meeting, Terre'Blanche allegedly rammed his BMW through the Paardekraal Monument's gates. The crash prompted police and media appearances, and Allan and Terre'Blanche were photographed together on the Paardekraal monument steps. On the first Sunday of 1989, the Sunday Times published a front-page article by Allan with the headline "The REAL story of me and ET and the SAP". In the article, she denied affair allegations and claimed that she and Terre'Blanche had arranged to meet with a media crew at the monument and that she had been commissioned to do a feature on Paardekraal revisited for a London-based news agency. Terre'Blanche asserted that "My relationship with her is absolutely professional" and related to his co-operation for her book project.

In the light of the controversy, Allan was the subject of a 1988 SABC documentary produced by Pieter Cilliers. Allan discussed her life and addressed the affair allegations in an interview with Carte Blanche co-presenter, Ruda Landman. Allan's colleagues such as the film critic Barry Ronge were also interviewed to discuss their experience of working with Allan.

Allan later spoke about the Paardekraal incident in an interview with the London Sunday Times, remarking that it resembled a "set-up". She explained to Stuart Wavell; "Fifteen police cars appeared and I don't know how many policemen. It was like the movies. I said, 'Am I on Candid Camera?'". Later, relations between the pair cooled and an acrimonious battle ensued in the press with Allan taking legal action against Terre'Blanche because of repeated nuisance contact. A case of crimen injuria was laid against Terre'Blanche in March 1989 relating to the damaged gates, with Allan subpoenaed as chief witness for the state. Ultimately Allan was not required to testify, and Terre'Blanche was acquitted.

In the early hours of 14 July 1989, the affair allegations and suspicions that Allan was a spy led Cornelius Lottering, member of breakaway AWB group Orde van die Dood, to place a bomb outside Jani Allan's Sandton apartment. The bomb exploded on a wall, abutting Allan's apartment and shattered all the windows in the apartment complex up to the seventh floor, but there were no casualties in the blast. Allan's newspaper reported in a front-page spread that the attack was a culmination of a campaign of intimidation against her that had included prowlers outside her apartment and telephone death threats. Lottering was subsequently convicted of the assassination attempt.

In an article published by the Sunday Times on 23 July 1989, Allan recalled a significant episode when Terre'Blanche had drunkenly hammered on her flat door and eventually slept on the doorstep and that she had to step over him the next morning. Despite her objections, her editor, Myburgh, insisted on publishing answering machine messages allegedly by Terre'Blanche, accompanied by a denial by Allan of counter claims that he had made against her. Allan recounted conversations with her editor "After the bomb he said, 'Right, we'll publish the tapes.' I said I didn't think that would be wise, as the security police had told me my life would be in danger. He said, 'We're going to blow them out of the water.'" She had just emerged from a course of traction for her seized back and was then rushed to hospital with a bleeding ulcer because of the stress. Allan fled to Britain for security reasons in the same week that the transcripts were published. The tapes were the Sunday Times lead story published on 30 July 1989 with the front-page headline 'JANI: MY ET TAPES'.

In retrospect, in an interview published by the London Sunday Times in 1990, Allan questioned whether her association with Terre'Blanche had been orchestrated by her editor, Tertius Myburgh. Despite having become his "blue-eyed girl" she questioned whether Myburgh had used her as part of a National Party government plot to discredit the far right. Several South African journalists have alleged that Myburgh colluded with the Bureau of State Security in the 1970s and its successor intelligence agencies in the 1980s.

In 1992, Allan sued Channel 4, the British broadcaster, for libel, claiming that in the documentary The Leader, His Driver and the Driver's Wife by Nick Broomfield she was presented as a "woman of easy virtue." Amid a montage of photographs from Allan's earlier days as a photographic model and Sunday Times quotes Broomfield claimed that Jani Allan had had an affair with Terre'Blanche. The documentary-maker and his crew were following the AWB and its activities for the documentary that was watched by 2.3 million Channel 4 viewers.

During the court hearings, Channel 4 denied the claim that they had suggested Allan had an affair with Terre'Blanche. Prior to the case, Allan had been awarded £40,000 in out-of-court settlements from the Evening Standard and Options magazine over suggestive remarks made about the nature of Allan's association with Terre'Blanche. Allan was represented by Peter Carter-Ruck in the case and Channel 4 was represented by George Carman. Carman described the case as rare in that it had "international, social, political and cultural implications."

The case sparked intense media interest in both Britain and South Africa, with several court transcripts appearing in the press. Allan famously told Carman, "Whatever award is given for libel, being cross-examined by you would not make it enough money." Several character witnesses were flown in from South Africa.

Terre'Blanche submitted a sworn statement to the London court denying that he had had an affair with Allan, saying "All these attempts to exaggerate the extent of my relationship with Miss Allan will ultimately be seen for what they are - a pack of lies." Allan's case was dealt a heavy blow by the statements of her former flatmate, Linda Shaw, the Sunday Times astrologer. Shaw testified in court that Allan had told her that she was in love with Terre'Blanche and wanted to marry him. She admitted that she knew about the relationship early on and that Allan had described Terre'Blanche as a "great lay, but a little heavy." Allan rebuffed these claims in court, describing Terre'Blanche's physical appearance unfavourably: "I've always thought he looked rather like a pig in a safari suit." Shaw described how she had peeped through a keyhole and witnessed Allan in a compromising position with a large man. Allan's QC, Charles Gray, dismissed Shaw's "wildly unlikely" testimony and stressed the physical impossibility of her claim. He continued to express that her field of vision through the keyhole would not be sufficient to support her claim.

Shaw also testified that four months later, in September 1988, she got drunk with Allan and accompanied her to a rendezvous with Terre'Blanche at one am. She alleged that she watched from a wall as the couple kissed, embraced, and fondled for half an hour in the back of Allan's car. Terre'Blanche denied having ever met Shaw. Allan alleged that Shaw had sinister motivations for testifying against her, saying "she has told people she was obsessed with me and that was the only way she could exorcise me. She was openly bisexual." She also agreed with the statement that Shaw was a "habitual liar" and continued "I disapproved of the number of men she had traipsing into her bedroom and suggested she should have a turnstile on her bedroom door." Andrew Broulidakis, a childhood friend of Allan's who also knew Shaw, brought into question the latter's character in a draft statement supplied to the court. Sebastian Faulks remarked in The Guardian: "What is it that makes George Carman worth £10,000 a day when plaintiffs witness Andrew Broulidakis was so easily able to wrong foot him." A witness also alleged that Shaw had disparagingly referred to Allan as a "frigid bitch" and it would be a "scream" to have her "nailed for gang-banging Nazis." Shaw also faced allegations that she had deliberately gotten pregnant to ensnare a boyfriend.

Further testimony was given by AWB financial secretary Kays Smit. Smit testified that Allan had phoned her to come and remove a drunken Terre'Blanche from her flat early one morning because Allan was expecting someone and was anxious to get rid of him. Smit testified to finding Terre'Blanche on Allan's couch "naked except for a khaki jacket around his shoulders and a pair of underpants". Her description of Terre'Blanche's green underpants with holes in them became the source of much ridicule in the press. Additional testimony against Allan was given by former colleague Marlene Burger, who claimed Terre'Blanche had proposed to Allan in April 1989. According to Burger, Allan was thrilled and asked Burger to be her bridesmaid. Gray countered that the claims were "utterly unfounded and wholly untrue".

On day 2, Allan's 1984 diary was delivered to Carman's junior counsel and used against Allan in cross examination. The notebook contained details of Allan's sexual fantasies about a married Italian airline pilot named Ricardo and it cast doubt on her professed celibacy. Allan told the court that her relationship with Ricardo only included "a degree of sexual foreplay". The judge said that any finding that Allan had lied about the extent of this relationship did not mean she had an affair with Terre'Blanche, whom she described as "a very different man". The diary's disappearance was investigated by the police, but it was found that the diary had been left in the home of an English couple with whom Allan had resided in 1989. Allan revealed: "I was in a traumatic state and I wrote down my worst fears and probably my worst desires," continuing "It was a way of dealing with my sexual problems. [...] This notebook is deeply embarrassing. I wrote it when I was under psychiatric care." Later her former husband Gordon Schachat provided evidence supporting claims Allan had made about her disinterest in sex, citing it as a reason for the breakdown of their marriage. Schachat also rebuffed perceptions in the media about her image: "her sexy public image is totally at odds with her real personality," continuing to describe her as "shy". He insisted she was neither an extreme right-winger nor anti-semitic.

On day 11 of the case, Anthony Travers, a former British representative of the AWB and spectator of the court, was stabbed. A court usher received a call saying Peter Carter-Ruck, Allan's solicitor, had been stabbed. This stemmed from a message by Travers who was lying in an alleyway. He said to a passer-by "tell Carter-Ruck I've been stabbed." It quickly spread that Carter-Ruck had been stabbed, followed by speculation that he was the intended victim. During the court case, Jani Allan's London flat was burgled. She said that she received a death threat on a telephone call in the court ushers' offices. The hotel room of a Channel 4 producer, Stevie Godson, was also ransacked.

Allan eventually lost the case on 5 August 1992. The judge found that Channel 4's allegations had not defamed Allan, although he did not rule on whether or not there had been an affair. The outcome received major media attention in South Africa and the United Kingdom, appearing on the front page of seven major newspaper such as The Times, Daily Telegraph, Independent, and The Guardian. Reports later emerged that Allan was considering an appeal and that Terre'Blanche was considering suing the broadcaster for libel. Following the verdict, Allan reiterated her stance "I am not, nor have I ever been, involved with Terre'Blanche". Taki Theodoracopolous paid £5,000 for the court records and gave them to Allan as he believed she had "been mugged".

Soon after, several publications speculated about political forces at play during the case. The Independent published details of what it called "dirty tricks" used during the libel case. Allan suggested that pro-government forces in South Africa wanted her to lose the case so that Terre'Blanche would be "irreparably damaged" in the eyes of his "God-fearing Calvinist followers". Another interpretation is that the AWB wanted to steal a manuscript of a book she was writing about the organisation. The AWB countered these claims, although Travers described the book as "dynamite." The South African business newspaper Financial Mail published a lead story on 6 August detailing the theory that F.W. de Klerk had orchestrated the libel case to discredit Terre'Blanche and the far right movement in South Africa. In the wake of the court case, Allan started a telephone service, with advertisements promising the journalist's insights into the lives and characters of defense witnesses, Linda Shaw, Marlene Burger and Kays Smit. The South African Sunday Times appealed to the ombudsman to discontinue the £1 a minute service. In March 1993, Die Burger reported that Allan was negotiating an appeal that was projected to be heard at the high court later that year. This was ultimately not pursued.

In 1995, during an interview with Cliff Saunders broadcast by the SABC, she said "The facts of the matter are [that] I did not do any of the things of which I was accused by paid witnesses." She was soon interviewed by Lin Sampson for Playboy and reinforced her disagreement with the defence witnesses. In the favourable article, Sampson described the rage against Allan as "the first public showing of what would become the new South African psychosis." Sunday Times defence witnesses were said to be irate that their shared publisher, Times Media, published the article. The newspaper proceeded to publish an extract of the interview to promote its sister magazine sales.

In a lead story with the Cape Times published in 1996, she spoke about Terre'Blanche; "He is a political Tyrannosaurus Rex ... a henpecked husband who has to remove his boots before he is allowed to enter his wife's pristine kitchen; a narcissist who carries a can of Fiesta hairspray in the pocket of his safari suit... ".

In a 2002 BBC film Get Carman: the trials of George Carman QC, Allan's case was dramatised together with a number of other high-profile Carmen cases. Allan was portrayed by English actress Sarah Berger in the production starring David Suchet. The Guardian decried Berger's accent for the role as "crude" and "caricature"-like, unlike that of Allan's, described as "relatively cultured and by no means excessively strong South African accent".

In 2012, Terre'Blanche's widow Martie denied allegations of an affair between her late husband and Allan.

In March 2014, Andile Mngxitama, a radical black consciousness activist with the Economic Freedom Fighters, addressed Allan in a column published by the Mail & Guardian. Mngxitama wrote: "I believe she [Allan] was punished as part of the general white psyche designed to shirk responsibility by sacrificing one or two whites to absolve the rest from blame. Allan’s association with Terre'Blanche was used as a mechanism to claim moral superiority so that collective accounting for the oppression of blacks is removed from view. She is basically a scapegoat."

=== Spy allegations ===
In 2000, reports emerged that Allan's London employer and SABC journalist Cliff Saunders was in a pay dispute with South Africa's intelligence services over services rendered in the past. According to reports, Saunders had also recruited another journalist, revealed to be Allan, to spy on the activities of the Inkatha Freedom Party in 1995–1996. Allan responded to these claims in writing an article for The Sunday Independent where she admitted she had been an "unwitting spy" in London.

Allan revealed that she believed she was working as a researcher and journalist at Newslink International, a news agency. Instead, she was working for Geofocus SA, a front company with a focus to spy. Allan became suspicious over the handling of money and for the concentration of her research on right wing political groups. Allan was able to break into Saunders' computer files when he was temporarily incapacitated and had not changed the code. Allan made copies of the files and provided them as evidence in her Sunday Independent story. The files revealed that he sought to infiltrate the IFP through Allan's friendship with Mangosuthu Buthelezi. Allan was also expected to cultivate a relationship with Buthelezi's chief adviser, Mario Oriani-Ambrosini. In another printout, Saunders wrote to the intelligence services; "As far as she is concerned she is simply assisting me with one of my consultancy projects. Once she begins receiving money she is compromised... and will have to continue. This technique is the well-known one you guys taught me."

== Bibliography ==
- Face Value (Longstreet, 1983) ISBN 0-620-07013-7
- Jani Confidential (Jacana, 2015) ISBN 9781431420216
