= Jani Confidential =

2015 memoir by Jani Allan

- Author: Jani Allan
- Language: English
- Genre: Memoir
- Publisher: Jacana
- Publication date: 16 March 2015
- Publication place: South Africa
- Pages: 285
- ISBN: 9781431420216
- Preceded by: Face Value

Jani Confidential is a memoir by the late South African columnist Jani Allan, once the most famous media figure in the country as a columnist for the country's mass-circulation Sunday Times. Allan charts her rise in South African journalism against the backdrop of excess and decadence of the country's white elites. Allan's life unravels when an interview with the late Eugene Terre'Blanche threatens to derail her glittering career. Her memoir became a critical success, lauded by publications such as the Daily Maverick, Mail & Guardian and Noseweek. Commercially Jani Confidential also performed well, becoming a Sunday Times top five best-seller. The memoir was published by Jacana Media on 16 March 2015.

== Background ==
Allan's memoir was published two years after her return to journalism. Allan began writing again in March 2013 after an extended absence and launched the blog My Grilling Life, a chatty restaurant diary about a South African household name that becomes a waitress in New Jersey. Allan later won viral success for her open letter columns to hunter Melissa Bachman and disgraced athlete Oscar Pistorius. Her return to writing also led to a 3-page interview spread in the Mail & Guardian in October 2013 in an award-winning profile story titled 'The return of Jani Allan'.

Against this background of renewed interest, Allan was contacted by Jacana Media to publish her memoirs. The research efforts for the project included gathering materials from storage in South Africa and England. Among these were the court transcripts of Allan's 1992 libel case against Channel 4. Taki Theodoracopulos purchased the records for 5, 000 pounds and gifted them to Allan believing she was 'mugged' by her unsuccessful libel action.

== Press ==
An interview with Allan and an extract from her memoirs, Jani Confidential was published in the February 2015 edition of Fair Lady, an iconic women's magazine in South Africa. On the weekend of 28–29 March, Jani Confidential was serialised by The Weekend Argus and by the Afrikaans-newspaper, Rapport on 29 March 2015. Serializations were also published by the Sunday Tribune and the Sunday Independent. On 30 March, The Star published an extract from the book. Billboards across Johannesburg advertised Allan's extract.

Allan also returned to South Africa for the first time in 14 years to attend a book promotion tour in Johannesburg and Cape Town. She began her tour at a boutique hotel in Houghton in conversation with Radio 702 book reviewer, Jenny Crws-Williams. A Mail & Guardian writer from the women's network wrote about her positive impressions about meeting Allan at the event. The event was moved from a Parkview restaurant to a larger venue due to increased demand. Allan's official book launch was held at Exclusive Books in Hyde Park, Sandton. Other events in Johannesburg included a lecture and talk with the University of Johannesburg's media faculty and students. Allan also addressed to the city's Jewish community at the Rabbi Cyril Harris Community Centre where she was interviewed by Radio 702 resident psychologist, Dr. Dorianne Weil. Allan is a former patient of Weil's and Weil supported Allan's testimony in her legal action against Channel 4 in 1992. Allan's final event in the city was sponsored by The Star and Allan's address was live-tweeted by David Smith, Africa correspondent for The Guardian,

In Johannesburg Allan also recorded her first television interview in years. Allan was the special guest of Jeremy Maggs for a Maggs on Media interview for the eNCA network. Allan also recorded an English interview with the Afrikaans network, KYKnet TV for the network's Polemiek programme. She also appeared in video interviews for News24.

Allan also made several radio appearances in Johannesburg in support of her memoir. Her first radio interview was with Sam Cowen on her Radio 702 afternoon lifestyle show. Cowen pronounced the emotional interview as one of her best in her broadcasting career. Allan also spoke in depth about her memoir and life to Sue Grant-Marshall on Radio Today for the Reading Matters programme. Allan also spoke to SABC's 5FM Fresh morning programme and to Andrea Van Wyk for Power Fm. Allan also spoke to Classic FM about her life and the key players in the book.

In Cape Town Allan was invited to speak to the Cape Town Press Club where the former leader of the opposition, Tony Leon was also in attendance. Allan was in conversation with journalist Darrel Bristow-Bovey at a Kalk Bay launch for her memoir that was also attended by Chief Mangosuthu Buthelezi. She also raised funds for the Big Issue South Africa when they also hosted a book launch and conversation with Viv Horler. Allan was also asked to address the Adele Searll 100 Club at the Belmond Mount Nelson Hotel. Jane Raphaely, one of the most influential names in South African publishing also addressed the audience to speak about Allan. Raphaely told Allan: “I'm so glad you have written the book because it will lay to rest the ghosts.” She also told the guests that: “Jani did not have an affair with Terre’Blanche. I could tell that from her writing. I urge you to read her book.” Allan also spoke to audiences at a well-received Gorry Bowes-Taylor Literary Lunch in honour of her memoir.

Allan also made several radio appearances in Cape Town, appearing on Cape Talk her former employer and was interviewed by long-running presenter, John Maytham. She was also invited as a special guest on Fine Music Radio's People of Note which follows the format of the BBC's Desert Island Discs.

Critical reception

Writing in the Daily Maverick Marianne Thamm was doubtful about the affair allegations with Terre'Blanche, describing the interview with Terre'Blanche as "misunderstood", a tool in the "manufactured scandal." She praises the memoir as "searing in its honesty and insight, hilarious and unforgiving." Thamm continues: "It is a portrait of a time and a place, delicately (and often hilariously) captured by a woman who remains undoubtedly once of the most talented writers to emerge from that decade." Thamm concludes that "Allan herself is a survivor, one of those people who, in losing it all, gained herself and more."

Allan's memoir has also been well received in the Afrikaans press. Herman Lategan's book review appeared in Volksblad, Beeld and Die Burger. Lategan wrote that Allan had been betrayed by "Judas friends" over jealousy and that she had been unfairly treated by a "patriarchal and chauvinistic media". He argues that Allan gave the conservative community ammunition as she was a target as an "outspoken" female figure in the public arena. She does not fit the mould of conservative women in South Africa as she is instead "a cosmopolitan mix of Sandton kugel, Mata Hari, Marlene Dietrich and Camilla Parker Bowles". Lategan describes the memoir as "a journal of treachery, malice and a mirror on South African society".

Len Ashton, Allan's former LifeStyle editor at the Sunday Times reviewed Jani Confidential for the South African magazine, Noseweek. Ashton writes that Jani Confidential is "a page-turning memoir. Those who knew the columnist in her triumphant previous incarnation will be staggered by this tale of astonishing endurance. And wry humour." Ashton also mirrors other reviews by rubbishing the affair allegations against "a fascinating woman" [Allan] as "the humourless PC view."

Allan's memoirs were also positively reviewed by Marika Sboros, an ex-Rand Daily Mail reporter now writing for BizNews. "Allan's memoirs are well written, punctuated with her characteristic style: the surgical journalistic precision, creativity, biting wit, bitchiness, and black humour aimed as much at herself as others." She continues: "There is an overwhelming unadorned, painful honesty and openness in her version of events and minutiae of the detail, a compelling coherence throughout". Sboros continues by commending the apolitical nature of the memoirs, citing the honesty of her privileged white upbringing: "She comes across as what she was at the time: not just a babe, but a foetus in the woods of South African apartheid politics."

A 2-part review was published by Rod Mackenzie for the Mail & Guardian's Thought Leader blog. Mackenzie described the memoir as "poignant", "thought-provoking" and packed with "verbal gems". Mackenzie continues: "Jani's beguiling, often self-effacing candour about herself and her shortcomings, along with her razor wit and photographic eye for the details of fashion and history (capturing an entire epoch of lifestyle in Eighties Johannesburg), all come together in a moving read about human frailty." And that "Jani Confidential captures what it is like to be an outsider in a growing world of immigrants and that the word “home” is one to be sung softly, or hung around one's neck like an ancient, all but forgotten keepsake."

In Women24, the women's network of News24 Tiffany Markman wrote that "This book, as much as it offers insights into Jani, offers insights into our history." Markman also refuted the affair claims, convinced by Allan's account in Jani Confidential. Markman concludes by describing Allan as "one of the finest writers to come out of this country, and she still is.

Radio 702 journalist, Jenny Crws-Williams was also enthusiastic, saying that it "has to be a bestseller: tightly written, moving, funny & horrifying in one great cracker that keeps spilling out surprises." Allan's former Sunday Times colleague Gus Silber described the memoir as "A tragi-karmady of epic proportions. A tale of an epoch. So vividly & elegantly told." Rebecca Davis, a high-profile columnist at the Daily Maverick described the book as "truly, truly fascinating."

== Stage play ==
After reading Jani Confidential, theatre producer Saartjie Botha became convinced that Allan's story must be told on the stage. The actress Sandra Prinsloo will portray Allan in the play titled Jani and directed by Christiaan Olwagen. The play was scheduled to premiere at the Aardklop festival in October 2015 but has been postponed until 2016.
