= Femina (South Africa) =

Women's magazine

- US model/actor Cindy Crawford on the cover of the December 2000 issue
- Categories: Women's magazine
- Frequency: Monthly
- Circulation: 37,289
- Publisher: Republican Press; Associated Magazines; Raphaely Kuhnel Pub.; Media24
- First issue: 1982; 43 years ago
- Final issue: 17 March 2010
- Company: Media24
- Country: South Africa
- Based in: Cape Town
- Language: English
- ISSN: 0256-0313
- OCLC: 610994080

Femina (stylized in all caps) was a women's magazine that was published in South Africa from 1982 to 2010. It was marketed toward older women, and for a time it was one of the leading special-interest magazines in South Africa. In the late 2000s the magazine was affected by the Great Recession, but they were also struggling to compete in the market—partially owing to the proliferation of localised editions of international magazines. It ceased publication in March 2010 due to a decrease in both sales and advertising revenue. The April 2010 issue was the final one.

== History ==
Femina was originally published by Republican Press in Durban. In a November 1987 Sunday Times interview with Jani Allan, Jane Raphaely revealed that she was set to become editor-in-chief of the magazine, and spoke about managing the magazine at the same time as Cosmopolitan: "I would say I’m completely involved – but not partisan. After 12 years of feminism women have still not earned the right to be diverse. They seem to be perceived as homogeneity whereas, in fact, they differ. That’s why their magazines must differ." Raphael's company, Associated Magazines in Cape Town acquired Femina and published their first issue in April 1988. The magazine was later published by Raphaely Kuhnel Publishing (also of Cape Town), which sold it in 2006 to Media24 (part of the media conglomerate Naspers). At the time of Femina's closure, Media24 was the predominant publisher of consumer magazines in South Africa. Its other women's magazines included Fair Lady, Sarie, and True Love.

As of 1992, editor-in-chief Jane Raphaely was also chief editor of the South African edition of Cosmopolitan. Features editor and columnist Laura Twiggs also presented a weekly chat show on the arts for Fine Music Radio in Cape Town.

== See also ==
- List of magazines in South Africa
- List of women's magazines
- Media of South Africa
