= Mario Oriani-Ambrosini =

Italian lawyer and politician

Mario Oriani-Ambrosini IFP MP

IFP MP
- In office 6 May 2009 – 16 August 2014

Personal details
- Born: 26 October 1960 Rome, Italy
- Died: 16 August 2014 (aged 53) South Africa
- Party: Inkatha Freedom Party
- Spouse: Carin
- Domestic partner: Jani Allan
- Children: Luke William
- Education: University of Rome and Georgetown University
- Occupation: Lawyer, Businessman and Politician

Mario Gaspare R. Oriani-Ambrosini (26 October 1960 – 16 August 2014) was an Italian constitutional lawyer and politician who was a Member of Parliament in South Africa with the Inkatha Freedom Party.

== Early life ==
Oriani-Ambrosini was born in Rome in 1960. He was the son of Columbia University trained constitutional law professor and international lawyer Raffaele Oriani, who died in 1971, at 39.

He was then adopted and raised by his grand-uncle Gaspare Ambrosini, an Italian founding father, jurist and statesman, who presided over the Italian Constitutional Court. Oriani-Ambrosini's education was influenced by his grand uncles, Vittorio Ambrosini a founder of the Italian arditi, and Antonio Ambrosini, an international law professor credited as the architect of the Warsaw Convention. On the paternal side, he was related to Alfredo Oriani, a futurist who subscribed to the philosophy of Friedrich Nietzsche.

Even though his adoptive father was a leader of Democrazia Cristiana, Oriani-Ambrosini spent his teenage political activism under the wing of Marco Pannella, the leader of the Italian nonviolent radical, environmentalist and libertarian movement. Oriani-Ambrosini maintained a lifelong association with it and was a member of its General Council.

Oriani-Ambrosini attended the Sapienza University of Rome, Harvard University and Georgetown University Law Center. Over a three-year period at Rome University, he assisted former President of the Italian Constitutional Court, Professor Francesco Paolo Bonifacio, with seminars on constitutional justice. He conducted research under the direction of the Secretary of the Italian Parliament, Guglielmo Negri, for the Consiglio Nazionale delle Ricerche and the Italian Chamber of Deputies on the US environmental system and the National Environmental Policy Act to support the drafting of an EEC directive and assess its compatibility with the Italian constitutional framework. Oriani-Ambrosini also assisted Prof. Nicola Greco in his conducting of seminars which focused on public enterprise law at the Universita' di Pisa. From the age of 17, Oriani-Ambrosini worked in the family law firm preparing written legal briefs and arguments.

After winning a Fulbright scholarship, Oriani-Ambrosini relocated to the United States to specialize in constitutional law and international financial and commercial law. In 1986, he became the right-hand man of Rutgers University law professor, Albert Blaustein, an international constitutional consultant who participated in the writing of over 30 constitutions worldwide.

He assisted Blaustein in a graduate seminar on constitution's drafting and became the Vice President of the Philadelphia Foundation and the public-advocacy UN-accredited law-firm Human Rights Advocates International, both presided over by Blaustein. He engaged in constitutional negotiation, lobbying, and public interest litigation in respect of Nicaragua (electoral law), the Russian Federation (preparation of the first draft constitution), Canada (position of Indian tribes in the national constitution and the tribes' own constitutions), Uganda, Fiji (constitution drafting), Romania (representing Alliancia Civica), Poland, Rom Nation, Italy (constitutional reports), the Moluccan Nation (Government in exile), Macedonia (representing VMRO), Cuba (shadow Government), Tibet (Government in Exile), proposed State of Humania, Seychelles (constitutional advisor to Sir James Mancham) and Zaire (Advisor to Paramount Chief Logotongo III). L He also acted as a legal advisor to the Rehoboth Basters of Namibia with respect to land claims and regional autonomy, and the Afrikaner cultural institutions known as "Cultura 2000" in the first challenge on the constitutionality of a law, and in the challenge to single medium-of-instruction education. Oriani-Ambrosini also collaborated on the upkeep of the Blaunstein's 60+ volume collections of "The Constitutions of the World", and "Constitutions of Dependencies and Territories".

== Lawyer ==
Although his career had always been politics and constitutional law, Oriani-Ambrosini made his living as a commercial lawyer and a businessman. Soon after his arrival in Washington, D.C., he became "of counsel" in the small but specialized international law firm of Hanna, Gaspar & Birkel, dealing with international commercial and financial transactions, including interest rates arbitrage, corporate and contractual negotiation, civil litigation in commercial matters and torts.

He began a lifelong friendship with businessman Peter J. Knop and became the General Counsel of the Washington D.C Knop Organization then consisting of TFI, SWPP Development Corp., Agricycle, Inc. and Avenir Corp. He served as the managing director of SWPP and Acrycle, dealing with venture capital and investment management, advising on the structuring of ventures, as well as waste recycling and agribusiness in a highly regulated and litigation-prone environment. Together with Knop he created a $10 million per year business which was involved in lobbying, litigation and government relations.

== Politics ==
In 1991 Oriani-Ambrosini began what would become a life-changing relationship with Prince Mangosuthu Buthelezi. In December 1990, he acted as the legal advisor for the Inkatha Freedom Party at the opening of CODESA, the two-year-long South African constitutional negotiations from apartheid to democracy. In June 1992, he sat with Buthelezi at the meeting of the UN Security Council in a meeting called by Nelson Mandela to push forward the transition to democracy. In November 1992 he drafted the Constitution of KwaZulu/Natal which was unanimously adopted by the KwaZulu Legislative Assembly as the constitution of a member state of a federation to be formed in the national negotiation process. This was the first detailed constitutional draft or proposal in the South African constitution-making process and in that process, helped to advance civil liberties such as abortion, gay rights and a ban on the death penalty, as well as second and third generation human rights which until that point were not part of the South African constitutional discourse.

For three years Oriani-Ambrosini worked full-time as the chief constitutional negotiator for the IFP and the erstwhile KwaZulu Government, and was involved in all stages and phases of the negotiation from its beginning to the end of pre-election negotiations, including the entire drafting of the 1994 interim Constitution. He played a key role in the international mediation effort led by Henry Kissinger and Lord Carrington and the negotiation of the Agreement for Reconciliation and Peace which enabled an all-inclusive democratic election in 1994. as well as the finalization of the South African Constitution.

After South Africa's first democratic elections, Buthelezi became South Africa's Minister of Home Affairs and the Leader of a minority party in Mandela's Government of National Unity. Oriani-Ambrosini was then appointed as Buthelezi's sole Cabinet Adviser. He held this position for 10 years, providing advice for all issues before Cabinet and in Parliament, including the negotiation and drafting of the final national Constitution, the adoption of hundreds of comprehensive legislative reforms and policy documents transforming almost all fields of government and civil society. He co-drafted film and publication laws, citizenship amendment laws, homosexual life partnership and customary union regulations and other reforms which carry a libertarian slant.

Oriani-Ambrosini is acknowledged as being the main, if not the sole, architect of the South African immigration reform process from 1996 to 2004. He was appointed by Buthelezi as a Member of the task force formulating the new South African immigration policy where he became the drafter of both the policy and the new legislation. He was also responsible for piloting the legislation through NEDLAC and Parliament, acting as the Ministers spokesperson in this often controversial process. He then drafted the interim immigration regulations and piloted the subsequent process of consultations for the final regulations.

In Home Affairs, he advised the Minister regarding all policy matters as well as the management of a 7000 plus person department during the tenure of six Director-Generals. He was intimately involved in the structuring of the electronic universal population and fingerprints registry ("HANIS") and related national ID card, as well as the departmental restructuring to devolve civil affairs delivery aspects to municipalities and in all aspects of the department's policies and legislation. Oriani-Ambrosini promoted the first high level security cooperation between his Department and U.S. security and negotiated high-level cooperation with Australia in refugee affairs.

During his ten years in the South African government, Oriani-Ambrosini's responsibilities were not limited to Home Affairs. In that period he advised the Province of KwaZulu Natal, including negotiating and drafting the 1996 provincial Constitution of KwaZulu Natal, a number of pieces of legislation adopted by the provincial legislature and several of the province's constitutional litigations. With Director General R. Sizani, he spearheaded the legal and administrative implementation of KwaZulu Natal's historical defiance of President's Thabo Mbeki's dictate that no lifesaving-antiretroviral drugs were to be given within the public system to prevent mother-to-child transmission of HIV-AIDS. He also advised the Coalition of Traditional Leaders and precursory groupings of traditional leaders and partook in all major activities of the governing and policy making bodies of the IFP, including re-drafting most of the Party's constitution and supporting all the IFP's annual party conferences. Throughout this period, Oriani-Ambrosini partook in high-level and State trips to Germany, Canada, Russia, the United Kingdom, Israel, Morocco, Italy, Taiwan, Indonesia, Australia, Belgium, Austria, the Netherlands, the United States, Portugal, France and Bulgaria, and was member of the Government of South Africa's delegation at three high-level United Nations conferences as well as numerous international visits and conventions.

Oriani-Ambrosini also directed, managed and/or engineered over 45 major constitutional and high-profile civil litigation cases on behalf of the IFP, the KwaZulu Natal Government and the Department of Home Affairs.

Oriani-Ambrosini left the South African Government in May 2004 to reopen his Washington, D.C. office and establish Ambrosini & Associates a legal and business consultancy. He established Promethea Corporation, a philanthropic company which manufactured safe kerosene cookers in Vietnam and distributed them in Africa to replace unsafe versions used by millions of people. While focusing on rebuilding his legal practice and setting up business ventures in China, Vietnam, Europe and South Africa, Oriani-Ambrosini continued to advise Buthelezi on policy and institutional matters. During this period, he drafted the IFP's proposed 2005 Constitution for KwaZulu Natal, Buthelezi's constitutional amendments Bill to separate the offices of Head of State and Head of Government and several other policy documents. He also participated in the 4th World Parliamentary Convention on Tibet and directed successful public interest constitutional litigation.

He became a Member of the National Assembly of South Africa in May 2009 where he served on the following Committees: Trade and Industry, Public Enterprises, Economic Development, Justice and Constitutional Development Portfolio, Finance and Rules, Private Members Bills and the Constitutional Review Joint Committees.

Oriani-Ambrosini brought to the South African Parliament the spirit and methodology of nonviolent democratic radicalism. He organized and single-handedly executed the first filibuster in South African parliamentary history, which forced a four-month delay in the passing of the controversial Protection of State Information Bill - South Africa's secrecy law. He challenged the constitutionality of the Rules of Parliament in a three-year-long multi stage litigation which culminated in a landmark Constitutional Court decision which declared the unconstitutionality of all the Rules of Parliament which prevented a single Member of Parliament from introducing legislation. He intervened as an amicus curiae in the constitutional litigation which barred the extension of the term of office of the Chief Justice and in litigation determining the measure of freedom of speech allowed in Parliament. He also used the tool of requesting the President not to assent legislation to return it to Parliament on constitutional grounds, which the President did with respect of the controversial Intellectual Property Law Amendment Bill which would take out of the public domain indigenous folklore and traditional knowledge.

Oriani-Ambrosini was one of the six founding members and a director of the Parliamentary Institute of South Africa (PISA) a tax-exempt, cross-party parliamentary forum, which facilitates meaningful dialogue amongst serving and former parliamentarians, captains of industry, opinion makers, leaders of civil society, academics and diplomats.

Oriani-Ambrosini was part of INPaT, (the international Network of Parliamentarians'on Tibet) an action group established and mandated at the World Parliamentary Conference on Tibet. He has visited Tibetan camps in India and has been an outspoken advocate of human rights protection in Tibet, often publicly challenging the Chinese government to allow an international parliamentary fact-finding mission to have unfettered access to Tibet. He led his party leader's successful lawsuit against the ANC, which found the South African government's repeated denial of an entry visa to the Dalai Lama to be wrongful.

Oriani-Ambrosini published extensively on economic and financial matters, advocating a libertarian model for the realization of a just and fair society. His thinking, expressed in his Libertarian Manifesto, endorses the role of the state in providing free and universal access to services such as education, health and social assistance, but suggests that the state ought to operate or own no delivery infrastructure or facility. He has advocated the reform of the monetary system to substitute debt-based banknotes with government issued debt-free notes in a system which no longer allows banking fractional reserve.

Oriani-Ambrosini maintained his legal practice in the US, albeit remotely, as well as a standing political association with the US libertarian movement. In 2013 he became a partner in the South African office of Translink, a Swiss-based international corporate finance firm specializing in mergers and acquisition with 30 offices worldwide.

At the time of his death Oriana-Ambrosini was a citizen of the United States, Italy and South Africa and was fluent in both English and Italian.

On 19 February 2014 Oriani-Ambrosini stood up in the SA National Assembly and introduced a private members bill to decriminalise the medical use of cannabis. The Medical Innovation Bill, is "to make provision for innovation in medical treatment and to legalise the use of cannibanoids for medical purpose and beneficial commercial industrial uses".

== Death ==
Mario Oriani-Ambrosini died in 2014, slightly over a year after publicly disclosing that he had Stage 4 lung cancer.

== See also ==
- List of members of the National Assembly of South Africa who died in office

== Publications ==
- Oriani-Ambrosini, Mario (2017). The Prince And I - A South African Institutional Odyssey, ISBN 978-0-620-74771-4, autobiography published posthumously.
