= Chinese Woman =

The Chinese Woman may refer to:

- Women in China
- The Chinese Woman, painting by Vladimir Tretchikoff
- Chinese Girl, painting by Tretchikoff
- La Chinoise, film by Jean-Luc Godard
- The Chinese Woman (Seinfeld)
