= Mpumalanga Show =

South African exhibition show

- Status: Active
- Genre: Trade show, Cultural exhibition, Agricultural expo
- Frequency: Annually
- Locations: Mbombela, Mpumalanga, South Africa
- Inaugurated: 2017
- Organiser: Mpumalanga Show NPC
- Website: www.mpumalangashow.co.za

The Mpumalanga Show is a South African agricultural, cultural and trade exhibition held annually at Mbombela Stadium in Mbombela, Mpumalanga. Launched on 6 September 2017, it was founded by activist and businessman Themba Sgudla, entrepreneur Brian Ring and then-Premier of Mpumalanga, David Mabuza to showcase the province’s agriculture, mining, tourism, manufacturing and cultural sectors.

The inaugural show took place in September 2017. It attracted approximately 18 000 attendees while stronger hotel occupancy was reported across Mbombela and White River.

The 2019 version of the show was dubbed "DD Mabuza's legacy" and Mabuza addressed the attendees.

== Organisers and partners ==
The event is hosted by Mpumalanga Show NPC, with support from:

- Mpumalanga Provincial Government
- Mbombela Local Municipality
- Mpumalanga Economic Growth Agency (MEGA)
- Private sponsors and media such as Standard Bank, Lowvelder and 013NEWS
