= Red Jacket (film) =

1998 documentary film about artist Vladimir Tretchikoff

- Directed by: Yvonne du Toit
- Starring: Vladimir Tretchikoff; Jani Allan; Beezy Bailey; Leonora Schmidt-Salomonson; Marilyn Martin
- Distributed by: SABC; Western Cape Provincial Library Service (VHS+DVD)
- Release date: 1998
- Running time: 45 minutes
- Country: South Africa
- Language: English

Red Jacket is a 1998 documentary film about the life of the world's best-selling artist, Vladimir Tretchikoff. The film was produced by Technitronics and televised by the SABC.

== Synopsis ==
The documentary charts the life of Tretchikoff, featuring contributions from public figures and Tretchikoff himself. The documentary is titled Red Jacket, Tretchikoff memorably recalled his war-time lover and muse, Lenka, wearing a red jacket when he first meet her. She would later pose as the model in his painting titled Red Jacket.

== Production ==
The documentary was researched, produced, and directed by Yvonne du Toit under the auspices of Technitronics. Several of the contributors held a history with Tretchikoff.

- Monika Sing-Lee was the subject of The Green Lady, Tretchikoff's most famous painting. Several commentators have stated that her face was just as famous as Mona Lisa. The painting is also the highest-selling print in history.
- Jani Allan interviewed Tretchikoff in the 1980s for her regular Sunday Times column "Just Jani" that also included interviews with art figures such as Walter Battiss. She later published a collection of columns as the book Face Value including Tretchikoff's. The background notes she provided revealed that he had insisted she sit for a portrait. Allan was also qualified to speak to the reviewer as she has a background in art. A former art teacher, she graduated with a BA in fine art and an MA history of art from the University of the Witwatersrand. Her former husband, Gordon Schachat is also a prominent art collector in South Africa. Art critic, Sean O'Toole singled out Allan for her "far more convincing" contributions to the film.
- Marilyn Martin is a former director of the South African National Gallery and considered by some as a detractor. In 2002, the Sunday Times reported that the gallery had never acquired works by the man considered by many as the country's leading realist painter. Despite the fact that Tretchikoff has resided in Cape Town for the past 60 years, Martin responded that the gallery had no intention of using the gallery's limited funds in acquiring his works as "he is not really regarded as a South African artist'" [and] "the revival of interest in his works would not be sustained."
- Beezy Bailey, the South African artist, controversial for exhibiting under the pseudonym of a black African woman, says Tretchikoff's ultimate crime was to appeal to the post-war working classes: "In the 1950s the whole class structure [in Europe and America] was as powerful as the apartheid structure in our country. That is why he hasn't been embraced and why he is uncool – his art was not snobby art, it was appreciated by the masses."

== Release ==
The independent production was screened to national audiences on the state broadcaster, SABC in 1998. Since then it has been distributed for educational purposes by the Western Cape Provincial Library Service who issued a VHS/DVD version. It is commonly used as a resource for art students. The film has since been rebroadcast, most recently on SABC 2 on 17 July 2011.

In 2011, the film was projected in a small antechamber at the South African National Gallery as part of a Tretchikoff exhibition.
