= Gordon Schachat =

South African businessman and art collector

- Born: 25 January 1952 (age 73); Johannesburg, Union of South Africa
- Education: Kearsney College
- Occupation: Businessman
- Known for: Gordon Schachat collection, African Bank Limited
- Spouse(s): Jani Allan (1982–1984); Pamela Schachat (1995–present)

Gordon Schachat (born 25 January 1952) is a South African businessman and art collector.

== Personal life ==
In 1973, Schachat met his first wife at university, the former Sunday Times columnist Jani Allan and married her in Mauritius in 1982. The marriage ended in 1984, with Allan blaming the collapse on her "obsession" with her burgeoning media career.

In 1992, Schachat supported Allan's testimony in the libel suit she brought against the British broadcaster Channel 4. He later remarried and had three children with his wife, Pamela.

In 2015, Allan wrote about the marriage in her best-selling memoir, Jani Confidential and credited Schachat's belief in her as a factor in her ascension in South African media. Allan detailed the collapse of the marriage: "Gordon had to live through the weekly angst about the column. It was like re-inventing the wheel every week. My validity as a partner hinged – or so I thought – on my success as a columnist. The column was the all-consuming Moloch. When it had been put to bed, there was nothing left of me."

== Career ==
Schachat has held a number of directorships during his business career. Schachat's early business background was in housing development, serving nine years with the Schachat housing group, Schachat Cullum. The housing group bought most of Ernst Erikson's sprawling Norscot estate in Witkoppen and divided it to create homes. Schachat's former wife described the profile of Schachat Cullum clients: Buying a Schachat Cullum house mean that you were probably professional, probably white, and this was your first time as a home-buyer.

Since the 1980s he spent 13 years in private equity and investment banking. This was followed by the establishment of Boabab Solid Growth Ltd, a precursor to the 1998 establishment of African Bank Limited, which Schachat is an original founder and architect of. Schachat currently serves as a director of the company as well as the Executive Deputy Chair.

In 2007 Abil's ZAR10.6 billion all-share offer for Ellerines furniture giant was approved.

Abil is listed on the JSE and is South Africa's biggest mass-market lender and recently issued a $54.81 million (550 million rand) senior unsecured bond.

=== Art collection ===
The Gordon Schachat collection was premiered at the 2009 Joburg Art Fair. The collection hosted the most prominent piece of the festival Security by Jane Alexander and Tumela Mosaka. Schachat's private art collection includes works by Robin Rhode. He displayed works by Rhode in the 2008 Joburg Art Fair.

Schachat's collection also includes works by the South African painter Alexis Preller. He is currently sponsoring a forthcoming book by art historian Esme Berman on Preller.
