= Style (magazine) =

South African consumer magazine (1981–2006)

- June 1996 cover of Style
- Editor: Naomi Larkin (last editor)
- Categories: Fashion, Women, Home, Travel
- Frequency: Monthly
- Founded: 1981
- Final issue: 2006
- Company: Caxton and CTP Publishers and Printers Limited
- Country: South Africa
- Language: English

Style (also known as Cape Style) was a South African consumer magazine that was founded in 1981 and published by Caxton and CTP Publishers and Printers Limited. The magazine's founding editor was Marilyn Hattingh, who based the publication on American "city magazines", aimed at an upmarket readership of conspicuous consumers.

== History ==
The magazine was a chronicle of South African high society, and its tone was acerbic and often satirical. The readership was synonymous with a "Kugel" readership of upwardly mobile, materialistic white South African women. Its content was entirely South African in origin, and the writing staff included Hilary Prendini-Toffoli, Patrick Lee, Gus Silber, Herman Lategan, Josef Talotta Adam Levin, Chris Marais, Linda Shaw and Lin Sampson.

Marilyn Hattingh served as the long-term editor from 1981 to 1999. Jack Shepherd Smith served as consulting editor to Hattingh. She was succeeded by Clare O'Donoghue, serving from 1999 to 2001. The magazine was later edited by Jacquie Myburgh Chemaly, daughter of former Sunday Times editor, Tertius Myburgh.

In 1985, the magazine's publisher, Caxton Ltd., was sued by the cosmetics businesswoman, Reeva Forman over a Style magazine article written by Lin Sampson, titled "Question: How Did Reeva Forman Get To Be So Successful? Answer: She Believes In God, Self-Promotion (and a couple of other little things)." Forman claimed that the article, published on 25 June 1985, was defamatory. On the day the article was published, Forman went to the Witwatersrand Local Division Court seeking an order to interdict further distribution of the article. Forman was granted a rule nisi. Caxton Ltd, Hattingh and Sampson opposed the interdict, defending the veracity of the article and claimed that it was in the public interest. The situation sparked significant media interest. Eventually, Hattingh and Caxton Ltd. agreed not to continue to publish the article. The defamation case went to trial in 1988, involving seventeen witnesses and much documentary evidence. The judge ruled that Forman had been defamed and awarded her damages. Caxton Ltd. launched an appeal against the judgement. The five-year case concluded with Forman granted damages of R1.35m in 1990.

Notable cover profiles included P.W. Botha's daughter, Rozanne Botha "First Daughter of the Land" in 1987. In September of the same year, Gus Silber profiled former Miss World and model, Anneline Kriel for the cover story. The celebrity columnist, Jani Allan, was also the cover star for the June 1996 edition, marking her return to South Africa after seven years in London.

In late 2006, it was announced that the magazine would be discontinued.
