= Caxton and CTP Publishers and Printers =

South African newspaper company

Caxton & CTP
- Type: Public
- Traded as: JSE: CAT
- Industry: Publishing
- Founded: 1902; 124 years ago
- Founders: Louis Paul Gindra, Edward/George Green
- Headquarters: Johannesburg, Gauteng, South Africa
- Area served: South Africa
- Key people: TD Moolman (CEO); TJW Holden (MD); PM Jenkins (Chairman)
- Products: Newspapers
- Website: caxton.co.za

Caxton & CTP, officially Caxton and CTP Publishers and Printers, is a South African newspaper company.

== History ==
The company was founded in 1902 by William Gindra and Edward Green, two Pretoria businessmen who started a small stationery and general printing factory in Pretorius Street and named it after early English printer William Caxton. In 1947, Dr HJ van der Bijl became chairman of the board; he was the driving force behind the company going public the same year, as Caxton Ltd.

In 1961, Caxton was purchased by Eagle Press and at the same time acquired its first newspaper, the South African Jewish Times. During the same year Caxton moved its operations to Doornfontein in Johannesburg. In 1968, Caxton again changed ownership, this time to Felstar Publications. During the same year, The Germiston Eagle was introduced as a weekly supplement to the South African Jewish Times. This was the forerunner of all community newspapers in South Africa.

By 1978, Caxton were publishing the following newspapers either fortnightly, monthly or weekly: Sandton Chronicle, North Eastern Tribune, Northcliff and Blackheath Times, Randburg Sun, Southern Courier, Mayfair-Brixton, Newlands-Melville Telegraph, Rosebank Killarney Gazette and Roodepoort Record.

In 1985, Caxton acquired CTP (Cape and Transvaal Printers), a R100-million printing company. This enabled Caxton to meet the growing demand for the high-speed, high-quality printing of newspapers and magazines. Caxton/CTP (as the company became popularly known) later consolidated their various subsidiary companies under the CTP banner and, post-1994, formed a partnership with the National Empowerment Consortium (NEC).

In 1985, Caxton was sued for defamation by the cosmetics businesswoman, Reeva Forman over an article published in their magazine, Style. The article written by Lin Sampson, titled "Question: How Did Reeva Forman Get To Be So Successful? Answer: She Believes In God, Self-Promotion (and a couple of other little things)." was published on 25 June 1985. On the day the article was published, Forman went to the Witwatersrand Local Division Court seeking an order to interdict further distribution of the article. Forman was granted a rule nisi. Caxton Ltd, Marilyn Hattingh (Style editor) and Sampson opposed the interdict, defending the veracity of the article and claimed that it was in the public interest. The situation sparked significant media interest. Eventually, Hattingh and Caxton Ltd. agreed not to continue to publish the article. The defamation case went to trial in 1988, involving seventeen witnesses and much documentary evidence. The judge ruled that Forman had been defamed and awarded her damages. Caxton Ltd. launched an appeal against the judgement. The five-year case concluded with Forman granted damages of R1.35m in 1990.

Caxton and another publisher, Perskor, merged in July 1998, forming a company with a turnover in excess of ZAR R2 billion a year. As a result of the merger The Citizen, a daily newspaper, was also acquired.

=== Magazines ===
Caxton/CTP's magazine division publishes fifteen titles in the following sectors: family magazines, women's magazines, home, lifestyle and decor, lifestyle and entertainment, religion and farming. Of them, Bona, Country Life, Essentials, Food & Home, Garden & Home, People, Rooi Rose, Vrouekeur, Woman & Home and Your Family were all closed by the company in May 2020.

== Newspapers ==
Caxton/CTP's newspaper division either owns or co-owns 88 titles, although a significant number of these are free community newspapers. The division's newspapers operate from fifty offices in eight of South Africa's nine provinces and have a combined print run of over two million copies.

== Websites ==
Of the five newspaper titles which Caxton is involved with, 72 titles have websites which are regularly updated. This group of sites is known as the Local News Network; a network of hyperlocal websites which run daily community content. Local News Network and the success of The Citizen’s website makes Caxton the second-largest digital publisher in South Africa, as per Effective Measure statistics from August 2018. Caxton also owns Looklocal, a news aggregator which delivers hyperlocal and international content, classifieds and events listings.

=== List of Local News Network websites ===
- Alex News
- City Buzz
- Fourways Review
- Midrand Reporter
- North Eastern Tribune
- Rosebank/Killarney Gazette
- Sandton Chronicle
- African Reporter
- Alberton Record
- Bedfordview Edenvale News
- Benoni City Times
- Boksburg Advertiser
- Brakpan Herald
- Comaro Chronicle
- Germiston City News
- Joburg East Express
- Kempton Express
- Southern Courier
- Springs Advertiser
- Tembisan
- Krugersdorp News
- Randfontein Herald
- Roodepoort Record
- Roodepoort Northsider
- Northcliff/Melville Times
- Randburg Sun
- Pretoria Record Centurion
- Pretoria Record East
- Pretoria Record Moot
- Pretoria Record North
- Barberton Times
- Corridor Gazette
- Echo Ridge
- Hazyview Herald
- Lowvelder
- Mpumalanga News
- Nelspruit Post
- Ridge Times
- Steelburger/Lydenburg News
- White River Post
- Middleburg Observer
- Witbank News
- Estcourt /Midlands News
- Ladysmith Gazette
- Newcastle Advertiser
- Northern Natal Courier
- Vryheid Herald
- Berea Mail
- Highway Mail
- Northglen News
- South Coast Sun
- Southlands Sun
- Zululand Observer
- North Coast Courier
- Chatsworth Rising Sun
- Overport Rising Sun
- Phoenix Sun
- South Coast Herald
- Maritzburg Sun
- Public Eye
- Heidelberg/Nigel Heraut
- Lenasia Rising Sun
- Echo Ridge
- Highvelder
- Ridge Times
- Standerton Advertiser
- Standerton Ibis

== See also ==
- Avusa
- Caxton Printers
- Independent News and Media
- List of companies traded on the Johannesburg Stock Exchange
- List of companies of South Africa
- List of South African media
- Naspers
- Style (magazine)
