= Scope (magazine) =

South African men's magazine (1966–1996)

- Raquel Welch headlining 12 January 1973 issue
- Editor: Jack Shepherd Smith; Dave Mullany
- Categories: Men, Entertainment, Sport, Crime, Fashion, Travel, Politics
- Frequency: Weekly
- Founded: 1966
- Final issue: 1996
- Company: Republican Press
- Country: South Africa

Scope was a South African weekly men's lifestyle magazine. The magazine was launched in the 1960s and was controversial for challenging Apartheid-era South Africa's strict censorship laws with its bikini-clad cover girls. The weekly was published in Durban by Republican Press until its final issue in 1996. At its peak, it was South Africa's best-selling English magazine, with a circulation of 250,000.

== History ==
The magazine was launched in 1966 by Winston Charles Hyman (Hint). Jack Shepherd Smith worked for Winston Charles Hyman (the owner of Republican Press at the time) and became the long-time editor. Scope magazine would achieve iconic status in South African media as a publication that petitioned for freedom of the press with its censorship-defying content. The magazine is also known for placing strategically placed black stars concealing certain body parts of the semi-nude models. The weekly also ran the Scope magazine "Girl of the Year" contest.

In 1972, the censor board of South Africa banned the weekly magazine, but this was overturned by the Supreme Court. This marked the seventh time in four years that the board had banned the magazine. The censor board had taken exception to a photograph published in May by the magazine, that showed a black man in New York City embracing a white woman. They also took exception to a semi-nude shoot of a model in the forest and at the beach. In other attempts, the board had formerly attempted to ban the magazine because of a cover article on abortion and a story on test tube babies. In 1975, editor Shepherd Smith maintained that fair censorship was impossible in South Africa because of the cultural diversity of the nation "Whose particular way of life are the censors going to help to uphold?". In May 1976, again the censor board issued a notice banning the magazine.

The magazine also covered important crime stories. In 1984 the weekly published a telephone interview with South Africa's most-wanted bank robber Allan Heyl of the Stander Gang who was in hiding in the UK at the time. The newspaper has also covered political stories and interviewed figures such as the spy Craig Williamson. Stories also appeared during the South African Border War that celebrated the military training of SADF soldiers and contributed to a sense of heroism. The weekly also published a series on the experiences of Horace Morgan, an ex-psychiatric patient who spent 37 years in mental institutions. Scope conducted interviews with Morgan (who had been admitted in 1937 after losing his memory) and reported the hostility of the institutions and Morgan's inability to escape the fate of a "wasted, tragic life in a cage".

Several notable journalists have contributed to the magazine. In 1990, former Sunday Times writer, Jani Allan launched the self-titled Jani Allan column at Scope. An article written by Allan on 5 October 1990, volume 25, number 20 in the magazine was presented to the South African parliament in 1991 in support of a legislation issue. As the apartheid regime crumbled in the 1990s and the magazine faced stiff competition from newcomers, the decision was made to make the magazine more risqué. This strategy was abandoned in 1995 when publishers, Republican Press sought to rebrand the magazine as an up-market men's general interest magazine. At the time, the editor, David Mullany said "it is time for the magazine to grow up ... and to address itself not merely to schoolboys and middle-aged voyeurs, but to the as-yet untapped body of discerning South African males who are desperate for something decent to read". However, the magazine suffered from heavy circulation losses and the final issue was published in 1996. In 1997, Mullany blamed religious elements in South Africa for the closure; "with the fire and brimstone shouts, the fundamentalists have made it impossible to sell our magazine".
