= Dene Smuts =

South African politician (1949–2016)

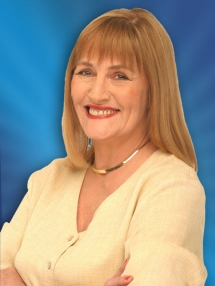

Shadow Minister of Justice and Constitutional Development
- In office 14 May 2009 – 5 June 2014
- Leader: Helen Zille
- Succeeded by: Glynnis Breytenbach

Personal details
- Born: Mudene Smuts; 13 July 1949 Bloemfontein, Free State, South Africa
- Died: 21 April 2016 (aged 66) Cape Town, South Africa
- Party: Democratic Alliance
- Education: University of Stellenbosch

Mudene "Dene" Smuts (13 July 1949 – 21 April 2016) was a South African politician. She was a member of Parliament for the Democratic Alliance, serving in various capacities, including as Shadow Minister of Justice and Constitutional Development.

== Early life ==
Smuts was born and raised in Bloemfontein, in the Free State, South Africa, and attended Oranje Meisieskool.

After high school, she continued her academic journey graduating from Stellenbosch University with a BA Hons degree.

Smuts was editor of Fair Lady magazine, managing editor of Leadership, and was a prize-winning author.

== Political career ==
A staunch libertarian who valued individual freedom and the consent of the governed.

Smuts was Broadcasting and Telecoms spokesperson for both the Democratic Party (DP) and Democratic Alliance (DA) from 1994 and 1996 respectively and specialised in free speech issues

Smuts launched her political career in 1989 when she was elected MP for the five-month old Democratic Party for the Groote Schuur constituency, and on 6 September that year, she participated in the great Peace March in Cape Town, a seminal date in that it coincided with her swearing in as an MP.

Smuts served as a constitutional negotiator for the DP during the transition from Apartheid to democracy. The process started with President FW de Klerk's 1990 Opening of Parliament speech. Smuts participated from that day until its conclusion in 1996 specialising in the drafting of the Bill of Rights for the Final Constitution.

She also served as the DP spokesperson on the Truth and Reconciliation Commission, the Constitution and human rights.

In 1992, Smuts became South Africa’s first female whip in Parliament and served as DP party chairperson from 1994 to 1997.

Smuts served on the special committee on the controversial Protection of State Information Bill also known as the Secrecy Bill, opposing clauses which literally made everything, including corporate information, a state secret and which would have made it an offense for journalists to publish any information not vetted by the state.

Smuts served the DA as Shadow Minister of Justice and Constitutional Development.

== Personal life ==
Smuts had two children.

== Death and legacy ==
Smuts died on 21 April 2016 in Cape Town. Announcing her death, the DA described her as "a great parliamentarian and defender of the Constitution".

Her memoir, Patriots & Parasites: South Africa and the Struggle to Evade History was completed just days before her death. The book, a political analysis of the period known as the Transition Era, was posthumously published by Quivertree in 2016.

Smuts's legacy is honoured through the Dene Smuts Memorial Scholarship Fund, established at Stellenbosch University for the study of human rights and Constitutional Law.

At her public memorial at Parliament's Old Assembly chamber, Democratic Alliance leader Mmusi Maimane remembered her with these words: 'Dene said that every one of us needs to be accountable to our conscience, to our country, to our Constitution and to our constituency. I would be brave enough to say that no one South African held up to these standards as much as she did.'

Political offices
Preceded by ??	Shadow Minister of Justice and Constitutional Development; 2009–2014	Succeeded by Glynnis Breytenbach
