= Glynnis Breytenbach =

South African politician and prosecutor

The Honourable Glynnis Breytenbach MP
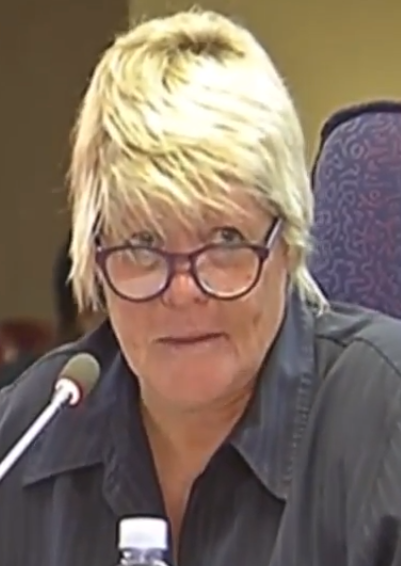

Chief whip of the DA in parliament
- Incumbent
- Assumed office 18 May 2026
- Leader: Geordin Hill-Lewis
- Preceded by: George Michalakis

Shadow Minister of Justice and Constitutional Development
- In office 5 December 2020 – 14 June 2024
- Deputy: Werner Horn
- Leader: John Steenhuisen
- Preceded by: Office established
- Succeeded by: Position vacant
- In office 5 June 2014 – 5 June 2019
- Deputy: Werner Horn
- Leader: Mmusi Maimane
- Preceded by: Dene Smuts
- Succeeded by: Office abolished

Shadow Minister of Justice and Correctional Services
- In office 5 June 2019 – 5 December 2020
- Deputy: Werner Horn
- Leader: Mmusi Maimane; John Steenhuisen
- Preceded by: Office established
- Succeeded by: Office abolished

Member of the National Assembly of South Africa
- Incumbent
- Assumed office 21 May 2014
- Constituency: Gauteng

Personal details
- Born: 9 August 1960 (age 66)
- Party: Democratic Alliance
- Education: University of South Africa
- Occupation: Prosecutor; advocate; politician; legislator; author
- Profession: Lawyer

Glynnis Breytenbach (born 9 August 1960, /ˈbreɪtɛn ˈbʌx/) is a former prosecutor for the National Prosecuting Authority (NPA) of South Africa and is a Member of Parliament for the Democratic Alliance (DA). She was Shadow Minister of Justice when the DA was the official opposition to the ANC. In this capacity, she has called for an end to ongoing political interference that has compromised the integrity of the NPA. Her protracted dispute with the NPA over her suspension in 2012 from its Specialised Commercial Crime Unit was covered extensively in the media. In 2017, she published a memoir, Rule of Law, and in 2018 was shortlisted for the National Director of Public Prosecutions post at the NPA, but later withdrew her candidacy.

== Departure from the NPA ==
In April 2012, acting National Director of Public Prosecutions Nomgcobo Jiba suspended Breytenbach from her position as a regional head at the NPA's Specialised Commercial Crime Unit (SCCU), on the basis of a complaint laid by a company called Imperial Crown Trading. Breytenbach has claimed that she was suspended because she had pursued the prosecution of Richard Mdluli, former head of the police's Crime Intelligence Division, on fraud and corruption charges. The charges against Mdluli were dropped by Lawrence Mrwebi, the head of the SCCU, a decision which was later found to have been unlawful.

Disciplinary proceedings, which at Breytenbach's request were open to the media, cleared Breytenbach of any wrongdoing in May 2013, a year after she was suspended. In the interim, she had unsuccessfully challenged her suspension at the Public Service Bargaining Council and in court. She was also acquitted of multiple criminal charges relating to documents which she had accidentally deleted from her work computer. However, after unsuccessfully challenging her subsequent transfer out of the SCCU, she resigned from the NPA in January 2014, joined the DA shortly afterwards, and was sworn in as a Member of Parliament that May. In February 2014, she reached a settlement with the NPA on all outstanding labour disputes.

Political offices
| Preceded by Office established | South African Shadow Minister of Justice; 2020–present | Incumbent |
| Preceded by Dene Smuts | South African Shadow Minister of Justice; 2014–2019 | Succeeded by Office abolished |
| Preceded by Office established | South African Shadow Minister of Justice and Correctional Services; 2019–2020 | Succeeded by Office abolished |
