= George Michalakis =

South African attorney and politician

The Honourable George Michalakis MP

Parliamentary Leader of the Democratic Alliance
- Incumbent
- Assumed office 7 May 2026
- Leader: Geordin Hill-Lewis
- Preceded by: John Steenhuisen (as Federal Leader)

Chief Whip of the Democratic Alliance Parliamentary Caucus
- In office 11 July 2024 – 7 May 2026
- Deputy: Baxolile Nodada
- Leader: Geordin Hill-Lewis; John Steenhuisen
- Preceded by: Siviwe Gwarube
- Succeeded by: Glynnis Breytenbach

Member of the National Assembly of South Africa
- Incumbent
- Assumed office 14 June 2024

Permanent Delegate to the National Council of Provinces from the Free State
- In office 22 May 2014 – 14 June 2024

Personal details
- Born: 6 January 1988 (age 38) Winburg, Orange Free State Province, South Africa
- Party: Democratic Alliance
- Education: University of the Free State (LLB, BA(Hons))
- Profession: Politician, attorney

George Michalakis (/mɪxəˈlɑːkɪs/; born 6 January 1988) is a South African politician and attorney who has been the Parliamentary Leader of the Democratic Alliance since May 2026 and a Member of the National Assembly of South Africa since June 2024. He previously served as the Chief Whip of the DA parliamentary caucus from June 2024 until May 2026. Michalakis previously served in the National Council of Provinces as a delegate from the Free State province from 2014 until 2024.

== Early life and education ==
Michalakis was born on 6 January 1988 in Winburg in the central Free State. He is of Greek ancestry. He matriculated from Winburg High School in 2006 and subsequently studied at the University of the Free State, from which he graduated with a Bachelor of Laws (LLB) in 2010 and a Honours degree in French in 2013. He is an admitted attorney of the High Court of South Africa.

== Political career ==
Michalakis joined the Democratic Alliance whilst a student at the University of the Free State in 2007. At the age of 23, he was appointed a DA councillor in the Lejweleputswa District Municipality in the central Free State in 2011.

=== National Council of Provinces ===
After the 2014 general election, Michalakis was elected to represent the Free State as a permanent delegate to the National Council of Provinces, the upper house of the South African parliament. He was only 26 years old at the time. In August 2014, he was appointed a member of the Joint Standing Committee on Defence.

Michalakis served as the African representative of the World Hellenic Inter-Parliamentary Association from 2015 until 2017. In 2024, it was reported that he held this position again.

Michalakis was re-elected to the NCOP following the 2019 general election.

In 2023, Michalakis drafted the constitutional amendment introduced by DA MP Glynnis Breytenbach to create a Cyber Commissioner, a new Chapter 9 institution.

=== National Assembly of South Africa ===
Michalakis was elected to the lower house of the South African parliament, the National Assembly, in the 2024 general election on the DA's national list. Following Siviwe Gwarube's appointment of Minister of Basic Education in the Government of National Unity, DA leader John Steenhuisen appointed Michalakis Chief Whip of the DA's parliamentary caucus. As chief whip of the DA caucus, Michalakis proposed establishing an oversight committee on The Presidency at the start of the Seventh Parliament (2024–2029); the committee was later established in March 2026 and Michalakis was named to the committee and unsuccessfully stood for chairperson.

=== DA Parliamentary Leader ===
In April 2026, Cape Town Mayor Geordin Hill-Lewis was elected to succeed John Steenhuisen as the Federal Leader of the Democratic Alliance. He retained Michalakis as the party's Chief Whip in Parliament on an interim basis. Hill-Lewis declined to take up a seat in parliament to lead the DA's parliamentary caucus; this move necessitated an election for Parliamentary Leader of the party's caucus for the first time since Helen Zille was DA leader. Michalakis declared his candidacy and competed against long-serving MP Kevin Mileham and former Deputy Minister of Trade, Industry and Competition, Andrew Whitfield. Michalakis won the internal caucus vote on 7 May 2026. Hill-Lewis welcomed Michalakis's election. On 18 May 2026, Michalakis appointed Glynnis Breytenbach as chief whip of the DA's parliamentary caucus as well the party's chief Government of National Unity negotiator in parliament.
