= Jane Raphaely =

British-born South African journalist and editor

- Born: Jane Mullins; 30 July 1937 (age 88); Birmingham, United Kingdom
- Occupation: Magazine Publisher
- Years active: 1965 - 2020
- Known for: Associated Media Publishing
- Notable work: Fair Lady; Cosmopolitan; Femina

Jane Raphaely (born 30 July 1937) is a British-born South African journalist, editor and a women's magazine publisher. She is best known for editing Fair Lady and was at one time the co-founder of Associated Media Publishing, publisher of Cosmopolitan (South Africa), Femina and O in the South African market.

== Birth ==
She was born Jane P Mullins to father William Peter Mullins, an Irish welder, and a Jewish mother, Phyllis Louise Rother in Birmingham, England and grew up in Stockport, close to Manchester.

== Education ==
She attended the London School of Economics and graduated with a Bachelor of Science degree in sociology and economics. Having obtained a Rotary Foundation fellowship, she travelled to the United States in 1957 and attended Columbia University for graduate studies.

== Career ==
Her career in journalism started as a personal assistant to the editor of the Bolton Evening News where she also wrote the book reviews. In 1960, she emigrated to Cape Town and started work for Dick Barfield in public relations and advertising at Van Zyl and Robinson. At the same time, she wrote a shopping column at the Cape Times for the women's page. In 1965, Nationale Pers wanted to publish an English woman's magazine, to be called Fair Lady and was interviewed for the position of editor. She held the editorship from that year until 1970 and then resumed it from 1973 until 1983.

In 1983 Jane Raphaely & Associates was founded by Raphaely, Michael Raphaely and Volker Kuhnel. In 1984, following her company's founding, she obtained a license to publish a South African version of Cosmopolitan in association with Nasionale Pers.

In a November 1987 interview with Jani Allan for the Sunday Times, Raphaely revealed that she was set to become editor-in-chief of Femina, and spoke about managing the magazine at the same time as Cosmopolitan: "I would say I’m completely involved – but not partisan. After 12 years of feminism women have still not earned the right to be diverse. They seem to be perceived as homogeneity whereas, in fact, they differ. That’s why their magazines must differ."

In 1988, Associated Media Publishing (AMP) was formed. She took over ownership of Femina in 1988 and change its format while also introducing new magazines such as House and Leisure, Baby and Me and Brides and Homes.

In 2002, Raphaely obtained the first foreign license from Hearst Magazines and Harpo Productions to produce Oprah Winfrey's O, The Oprah Magazine in South Africa. At least seventy per cent of the magazine included the American version and with copy approval maintained by the parent companies. In 2003, her company, Associated Media Publishing (AMP), obtained a license to publish Marie Claire in partnership with Groupe Marie Claire in South Africa. The agreement lasted until December 2018 after publishing 180 issues.

Other magazines produced by the group included Good Housekeeping and Women on Wheels. Her company began publishing Good Housekeeping with Hearst Magazines in South Africa in 2011 and its Afrikaans version, Goeie Huishouding.

2010 saw her daughter Julia take over as CEO of her company while she remained as its chairman. In 2014, Oprah's O Magazine publication in South Africa was ended by her company.

In April 2020, Associated Media, CEO Julia Raphaely announced that the company founded by her mother would cease trading. She said the cause of its closure was the effects of the COVID-19 lockdown in South Africa that had closed printing and distribution channels, halted advertising spend and that event hosting was impossible.

== Personal life ==
Jane appeared on the original version of Name That Tune in 1959. In her autobiography, Jane references the show, saying she had "fall[en] into appearing on a TV show in America."

Jane married Michael David Raphaely in Birmingham on 24 September 1961. They had one son and three daughters. Jane is Jewish.

== Honours ==
In 2000, Raphaely was honoured with a Print Media SA Fellowship Award by Print Media South Africa (PMSA). Other honours awarded to her include Business Woman of the Year, Media Innovator of the Year and Star Woman of Our Time, all in 1986 and the first Women in The Media lifetime achiever award of 2003.

== Bibliography ==
- Raphaely, Jane (2012). Jane Raphaely unedited. Cape Town: Associated Media Pub. ISBN 9780620531795. OCLC 804823985.
