= TruckVault's Xtreme Hunts =

TruckVault's Xtreme Hunts is a television series on the Versus Cable Network. It first aired August 1, 2008.

== Overview ==
TruckVault's Xtreme Hunts is a blend of reality and extreme hunting. Each episode follows host Mark Kayser, portrayed as an average family man, undertaking the quest of extreme hunts across North America. Kayser hunts large and small game across harsh terrain and through inclement weather while providing tips on hunting, game calling, gear, physical conditioning and other topics.

The series also features a number of "Hero Hunts" to honor law enforcement heroes. Three law enforcement personnel are selected to join Mark Kayser and the crew for televised hunts in recognition of their public service. The participants are nominated by their peers. The hunts take place in South Dakota, Montana and Colorado and feature pheasant, prairie chicken and waterfowl hunting.

TruckVault's Xtreme Hunts is filmed and produced entirely in HD by Orion Multimedia. In 2009 a production change has been made and Careco will be the new producer. It airs on the Versus Network in 2008 on Fridays at 3:30 p.m. EDT and Saturdays at 11:30 a.m. EDT.
