= Mark Kayser =

Mark Kayser is the host of the television series TruckVault's Xtreme Hunts on the Versus Cable Network.

== Early life and education ==
Kayser graduated from South Dakota State University in May 1988 with a major in journalism and a minor in history.

== Career ==
Mark worked his way from being an outdoor photographer for the South Dakota Department of Game, Fish and Parks, to an outdoor writer/ photographer for the South Dakota Department of Tourism, to Outdoor Promotions Manager for the same department. From there he took on a Media Relations Coordinator position where he oversaw all media relations projects including PR, which eventually led Mark to managing all media relations for the South Dakota Department of Tourism and the generation of $2.5 million annually in traceable publicity.

Kayser has been a freelance writer contributing to publications like: Outdoor Life, North American Hunter, American Hunter, Sporting Classics and Bowhunter magazine. Mark continues to write a Whitetail Bowhunting column for Bowhunt America, and remains the Whitetail columnist and the conservation editor for North American Hunter to this day.

== Television ==
Kayser has made appearances on: World of Beretta (Versus), The Wild Rules (ESPN), Realtree Outdoors (ESPN2), Backroads With Ron & Raven (ESPN), American Hunter (ESPN2), North American Outdoors (ESPN2), Tales of the Hunt (TOC), and Cabela’s Sportsman’s Quest (ESPN2) among others.

Kayser is also currently co-hosting the popular series Whitetail Revolution that airs on Versus and launched in 2006.
