= Vittorio Ambrosini =

Italian politician

Vittorio Ambrosini (1893–1971) was an Italian politician, journalist, and a founding member of the Arditi, the Italian special forces unit in World War I.
