= Alicia Markova "The Dying Swan" =

1949 painting by Vladimir Tretchikoff

- Artist: Vladimir Tretchikoff
- Year: 1949
- Medium: Oil on canvas
- Dimensions: 92 cm × 72 cm (36 in × 28.5 in)

Alicia Markova "The Dying Swan" is a 1949 painting by Vladimir Tretchikoff. (It is also known simply as The Dying Swan, but is not to be confused with another Tretchikoff painting with the same title.) The painting depicts the prima ballerina Alicia Markova in her most famous role, The Dying Swan, from which she became inseparable in the minds of the public; it is for this reason that the artist painted the swan and Markova as one and the same being.

== Historical background ==
Tretchikoff tells the story behind the painting in his 1973 autobiography, Pigeon's Luck. While the Royal Ballet were touring South Africa, Tretchikoff sat in at a rehearsal in Cape Town, where he saw Markova perform "The Dying Swan". Moved by the experience, he approached Markova's manager and asked for permission to paint her. Although initially reluctant, the manager agreed.

However, Markova had little free time to model for the painting, so Tretchikoff was obliged to work around her schedule. By the time he had painted the background and the outline of the swan (which he modelled on a dead duck), the company had already moved on. Tretchikoff followed Markova to Johannesburg, and then to Pretoria, while continuing to work on the painting. He described Markova as "infinitely patient in the long hours of posing".

The idea behind the painting, he wrote, was "to paint Alicia intertwined with the bird she portrayed, the two inseparable in the moment of death, the end of the dance".
