= Melissa Bachman =

American hunter, producer, television program host

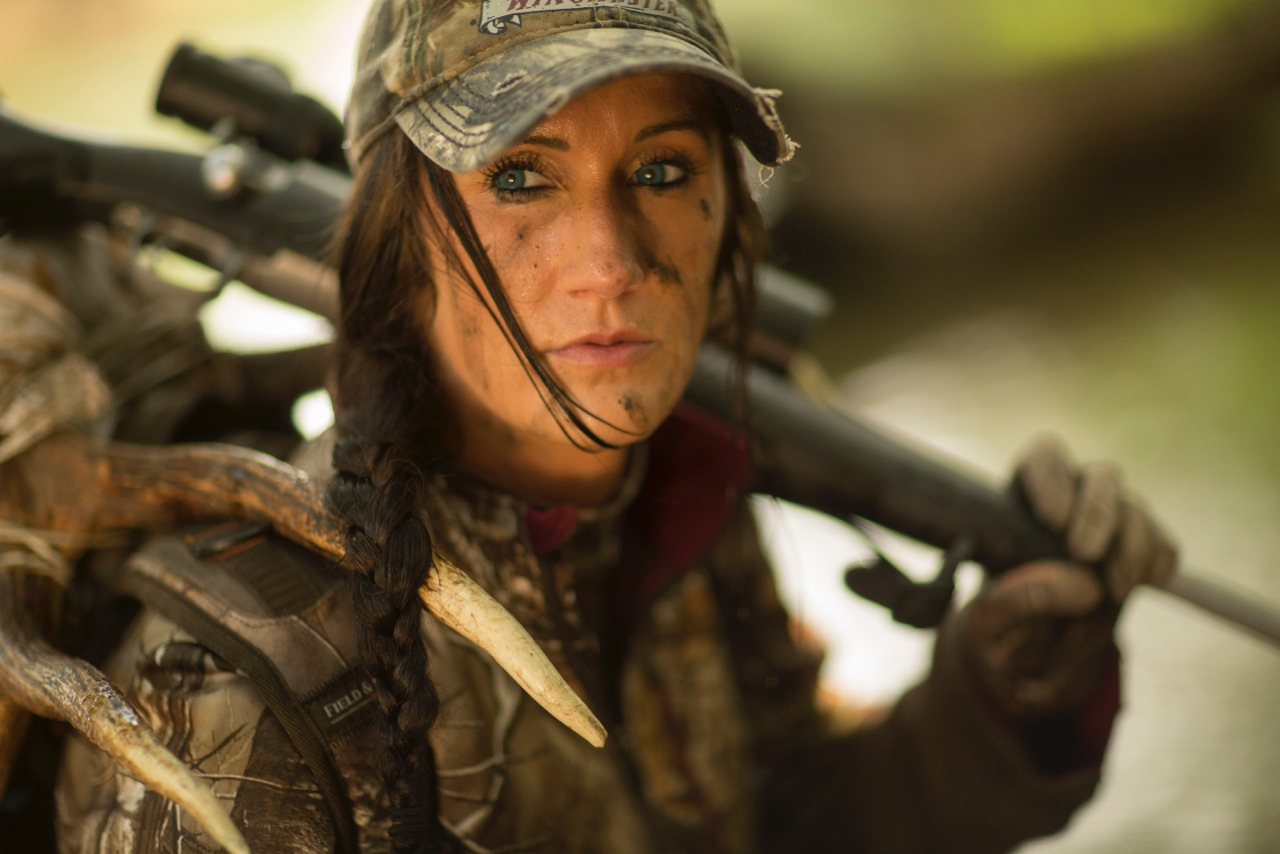
- Bachman in 2014
- Born: July 17, 1984 (age 41)
- Education: St. Cloud State University

Melissa Bachman (born July 17, 1984) is an American hunter, producer, and host of hunting television programs, currently of the cable television program Winchester Deadly Passion on the Sportsman Channel, Pursuit Channel, and Wild TV. As a prominent female hunter, she has received personal online attacks.

== Early life and education ==
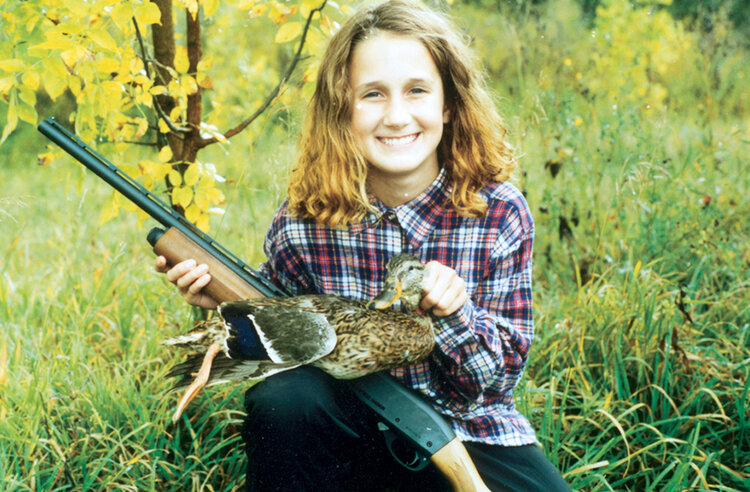
A young Bachman with gun and duck.

Bachman was raised in Paynesville, Minnesota. Her parents, Dale and Karen Bachman, were both avid hunters who took her on their hunting trips since she was five years old.

Bachman was not able to actually hunt until she was twelve, and had to do push-ups for over a year to develop the muscles to pull her 40-pound (18 kg) bow. Later her parents would sign a work permit so she could start high school at 10 a.m., after hunting in the mornings.

Bachman attended Paynesville Area High School where she competed in pole vault for the track team, setting school and section 5A records. She served as student representative to the Chamber of Commerce board, winning an Outstanding Young Person award, played saxophone in the concert, pep, and marching bands, was homecoming queen, student council treasurer, a member of the National Honor Society, captain of track and speech teams, a lector in her Catholic church, and earned the Girl Scouts Gold Award by organizing younger Girl Scouts to interact with the elderly.

Bachman graduated Paynesville Area High School magna cum laude in 2002, and attended St. Cloud State University with a double major in Spanish and broadcast journalism. She survived a likely bout with viral meningitis during a 2004 summer Spanish immersion program in Costa Rica. While pole vaulting in high school and college, Bachman would wrap her pole in camouflage to symbolize her passion for hunting.

== Career ==
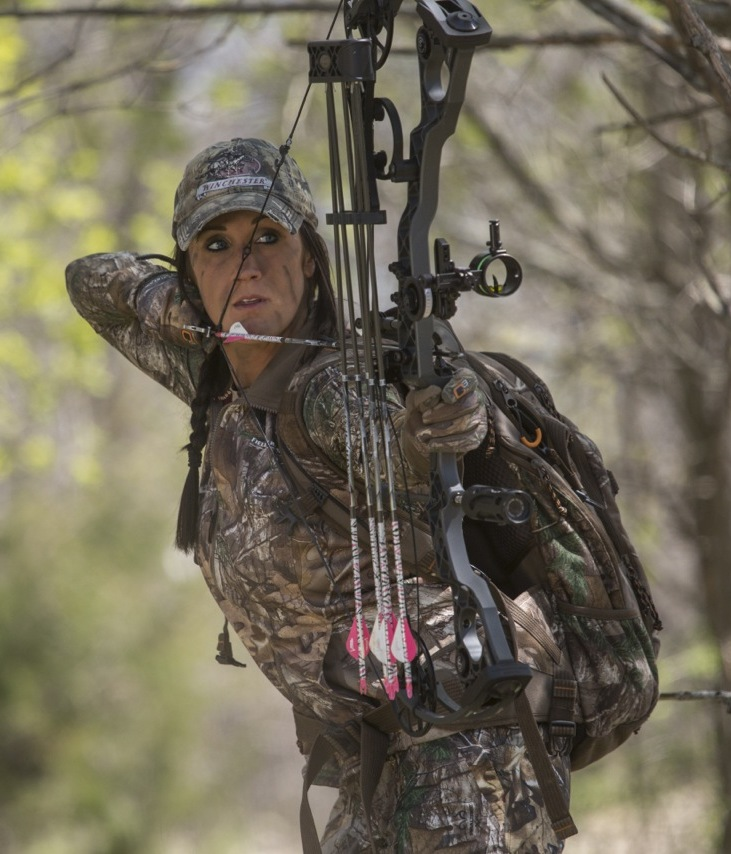
Bachman bowhunting (2015).

After graduating in 2006, Bachman sent out 76 video resumes without finding work, and had to take an unpaid internship with North American Media Group's North American Hunter Television in Minnetonka, driving 150 miles (240 km) round trip each day, and working nights as a waitress at a nightclub. Four months later she was hired as a full-time producer for the show. She progressed to camera work, first by giving on-camera archery tips that other hunters were unwilling to, and later by filming and editing many of her own hunts to be aired for free, including a bow hunt of a 202-inch (510 cm) Illinois White-tailed deer. She has said: "Nobody turns down free work, I learned." As a camera professional, she shot, produced, and edited the first season of Mark Kayser's Extreme Pursuits program.

In 2010, Bachman left NAMG to found her own production company named Deadly Passion Productions. She edited and did post-production work for hunting television shows including Dangerous Game, created online and instructional videos, led seminars on hunting at sports shows, managed social media sites, and wrote magazine articles. In January 2012, she returned to North American Hunter as a host. Among her work for NAH was a five-day-a-week video series called "My Take" with Melissa Bachman, that ran from February to August.

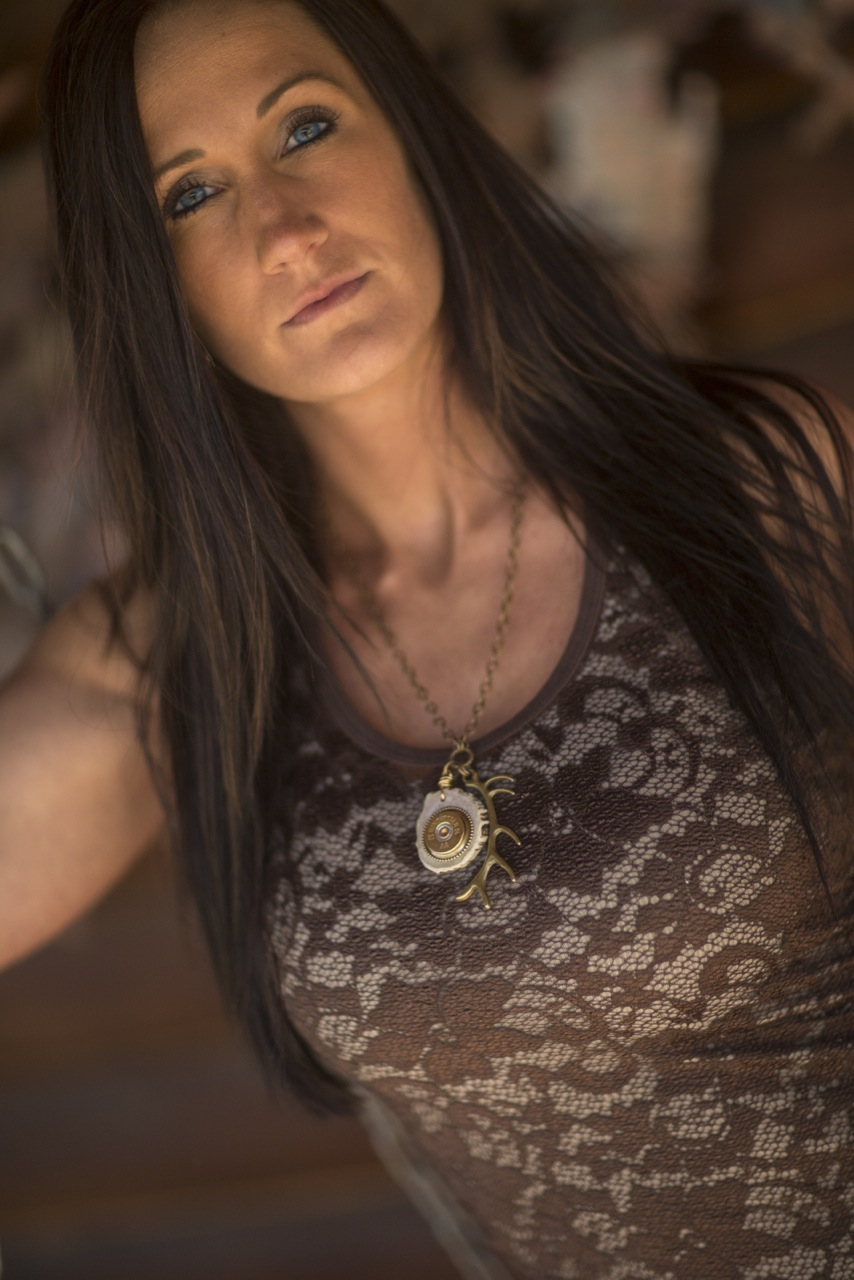
Bachman with SureShot Jewelry ammunition based necklace (2015).

In March 2012, Bachman took the world record for a red stag shot by a female archer in a New Zealand hunt. The hunt was aired both on "My Take" and on Winchester Deadly Passion.

The Winchester Deadly Passion program, also produced by North American Media Group, began airing in July 2012 on the Pursuit Channel, and was picked up by the Sportsman Channel for its third season, July 2014. It is named after and sponsored by Winchester Ammunition. In it, Melissa Bachman is filmed traveling the world to hunt animals using rifle, bow, or shotgun. Bachman stars in, produces, and edits the program herself. She works around 200 days a year in the field, switching between two cameramen who need more time off. In 2014, the program came out with a clothing line, and in 2015, Bachman sponsored an ammunition based jewelry line.

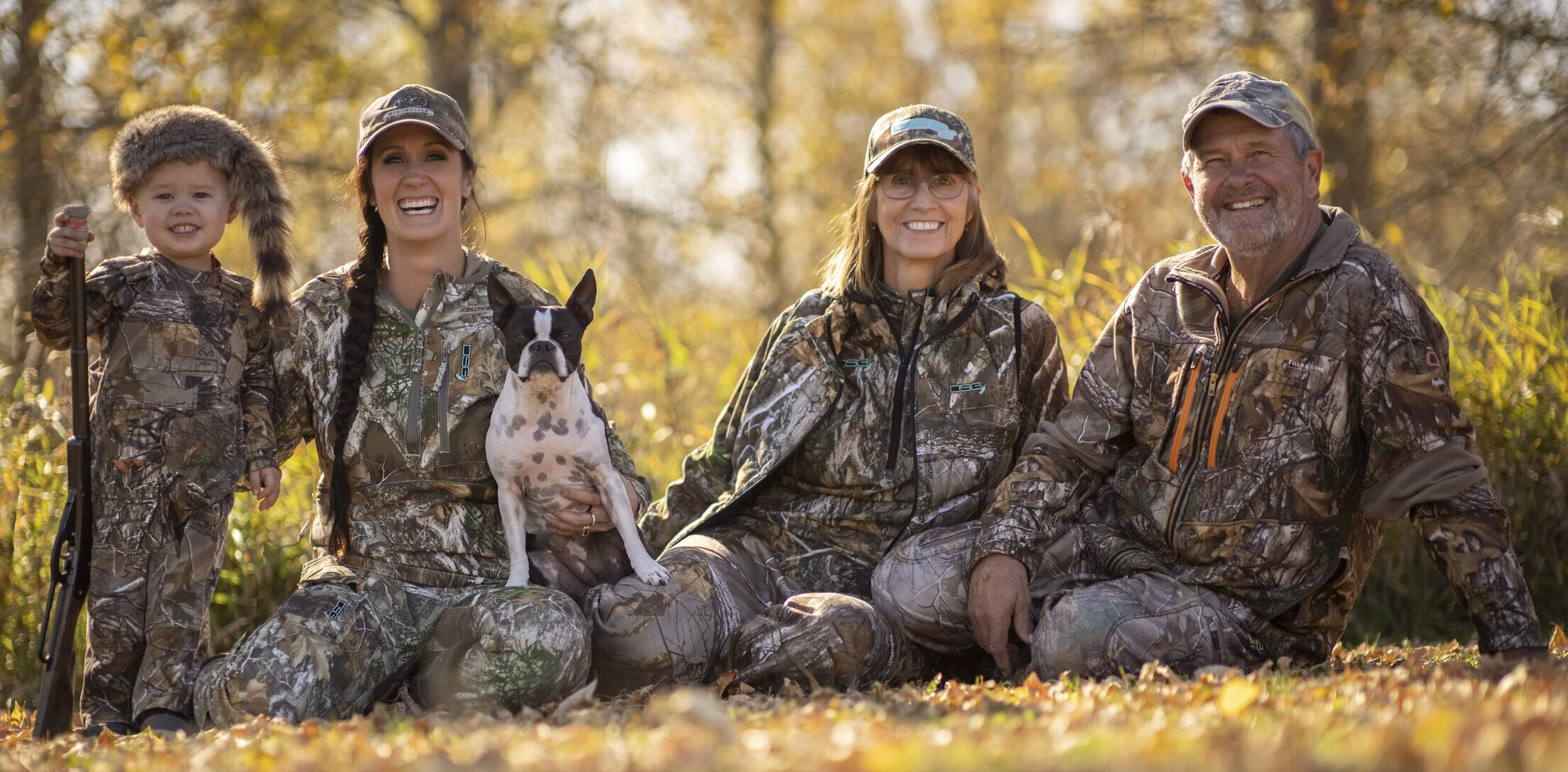
Bachman with her son Jaxon Bearshield, mother Karen, and father Dale (2022).

Bachman's parents accompanied her on hunts for her shows. Her mother Karen hunted deer and antelope with her in multiple states from 2013 to 2015, then alligator in South Carolina in 2016. Her father Dale went bear hunting with her in Alaska. Her 79-year-old grandmother hunted deer with her in Colorado in 2016.

== Controversies over trophy hunting ==
On August 30, 2012, the National Geographic Channel was planning to have Bachman as one of their contestants for the show that would become Ultimate Survival Alaska, until a Change.org petition to exclude her because of her hunting background received 13,000 signatures in under 24 hours. National Geographic's statement, in three Twitter posts, said she was eliminated because hunting was not the focus of the show. Conservationist Tim Martell, who launched the petition, had previously launched a Facebook campaign against Rosie O'Donnell for appearing with a hammerhead shark she had caught. Martell stated he did not oppose all hunting, but primarily trophy hunting, which he considered wasteful.

In November 2013, Bachman posted a photograph of herself smiling by the body of a lion, captioned "An incredible day hunting in South Africa! Stalked inside 60-yards on this beautiful male lion... what a hunt!" to her Twitter and Facebook accounts. The photo quickly drew Internet outrage, including multiple wishes for her death, comedian and animal welfare activist Ricky Gervais re-tweeting Bachman's message while adding "spot the typo", and an online petition from a Cape Town resident calling on the South African government to eject her from the country, which gathered hundreds of thousands of signatures. In reaction, Bachman temporarily deactivated her public Facebook and Twitter accounts. Many of the death threats instead went to an unrelated person with a similar name.

The Maroi Conservancy, which facilitated the hunt through another outfitter in Zeerust, defended the hunt, stating it was both legal and ethical, and that food and funds from these kinds of hunts go to the struggling local community. International commentators said that the online anger directed at Bachman was extraordinary, sexist, and misogynist, and that evidence showed that banning hunting drives species extinct much more than controlled hunts do. At the time of the hunt, African lions were not listed as endangered under the United States Endangered Species Act, though their status was under reassessment and debate.

Bachman did not directly comment in response to the controversies, though she has said that hate mail from anti-hunters was one thing she "could do without". In 2015, she stated, "No response at all seems to be the best. It doesn’t matter what you say, or how you say it, some people will always disagree and attack."

== Personal life ==
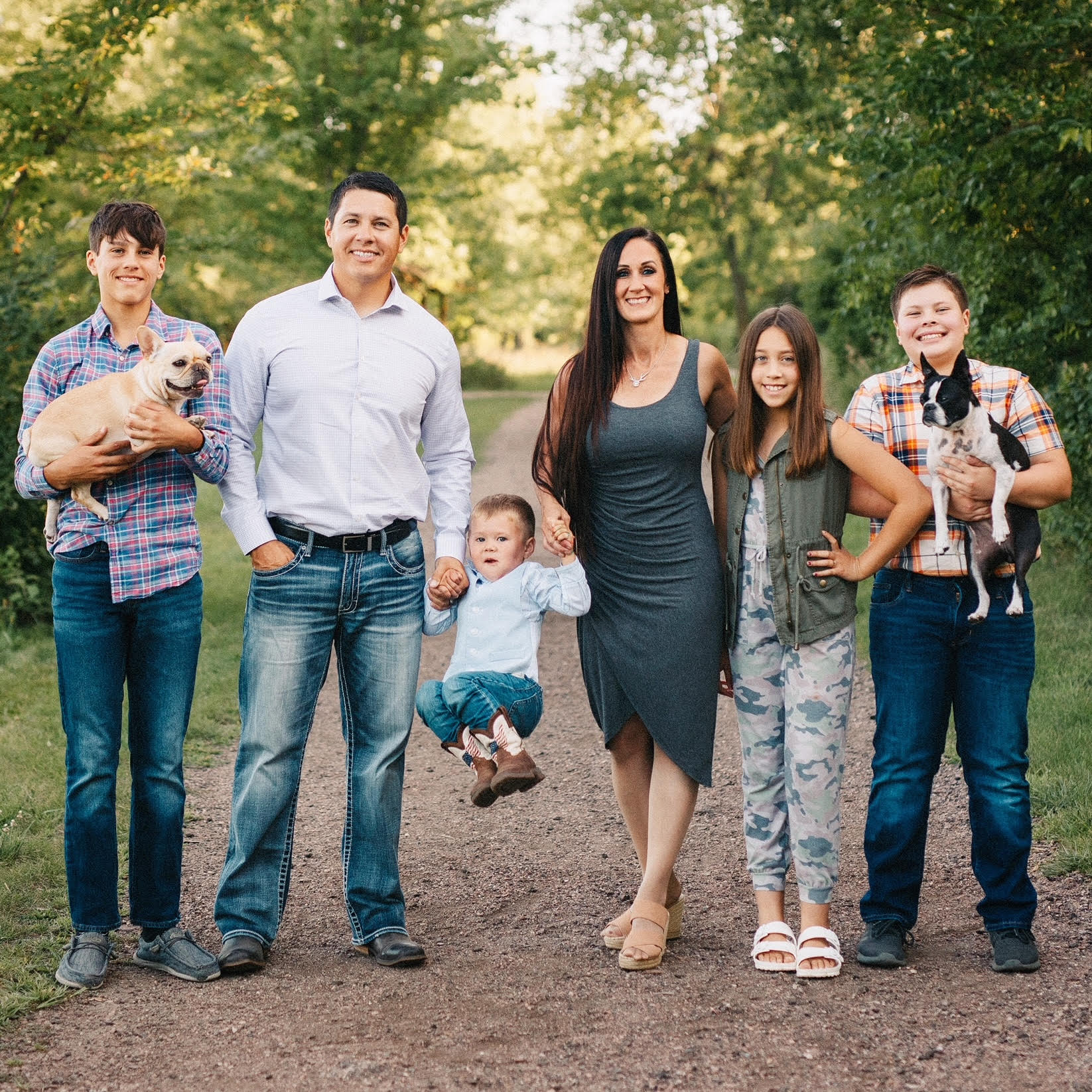
Bachman with her family (2022).

Bachman met Rosebud Sioux game warden Ben Bearshield on a hunt on their reservation in 2012, which was shown on Winchester Deadly Passion in 2013. They became friends and he accompanied her on more of her hunts in subsequent years. Their son Jaxon was born in August 2018. Bachman hunted throughout her pregnancy, and resumed hunting a few weeks after delivery. Bachman and Bearshield married in 2019 on a beach in the Dominican Republic. Jax appeared on Winchester Deadly Passion in 2022, hunting turkey with a shotgun at the age of three.

As late as 2015, Bachman struggled for an answer when asked about her life outside TV programs and hunting, saying "I can't even keep a plant alive — that's how little I'm home". On Christmas Day 2015, Bachman received a female Boston Terrier named Pork Chop that began to accompany her on her hunts.

Bachman and Bearshield built a house in South Dakota, where she lives with her husband, Jax, two dogs (Pork Chop and Ribeye), and three older stepchildren.
