= Chinese Girl =

1952 painting by Vladimir Tretchikoff

- Artist: Vladimir Tretchikoff
- Year: 1952–1953
- Medium: Oil on canvas

Chinese Girl (often popularly known as The Green Lady) is a 1952 painting by Vladimir Tretchikoff. Mass-produced prints of the work in subsequent years were among the best-selling of the twentieth century. The painting is of a Chinese young woman and is best known for the unusual skin tone used for her face — a blue-green colour, which gives the painting its popular name The Green Lady.

== History ==
Though Tretchikoff maintained that the first version of this painting had been destroyed in Cape Town and he painted a new version during his 1953 tour of the US, researchers have found no proof of this claim. The original sold for £982,050 at Bonhams auction house in London on 20 March 2013. It was purchased by British jeweller Laurence Graff. Since 30 November the same year, it has been on public display at Delaire Graff Estate near Stellenbosch, South Africa. Some scenes of Alfred Hitchcock's film Frenzy (1972) show portraits of the model Monika Sing-Lee (later Monika Pon-su-san, her married name) by Tretchikoff, including this one. The picture is also used as the front cover for the 1990s album Slap! by the British band Chumbawamba.

== Model ==
Monika Sing-Lee was around twenty at the time, and had some European ancestry. Also known by her married name, Pon-Su-San, she was encountered by Tretchikoff, at the suggestion of Russian dancer Masha Arsenyeva, while working in her uncle's launderette in Cape Town, South Africa. Pon-Su-San died in Johannesburg on 14 June 2017.

== See also ==
- Red Jacket
- Alicia Markova "The Dying Swan"
