= Gaspare Ambrosini =

Italian politician

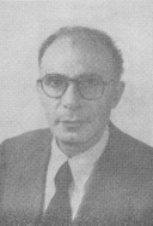
Gaspare Ambrosini

Gaspare Ambrosini (24 October 1886 in Favara, Sicily – 17 August 1985 in Rome) was an Italian jurist and statesman.

== Career and contributions ==
In 1911 Ambrosini became the youngest professor of constitutional law of his times. In 1918, acting as private assistant to aging Italian Prime Minister Vittorio Emanuele Orlando, played a noted role in the negotiation of the Treaty of Versailles.

Ambrosini escaped having to align himself with the ideology of fascism first by teaching colonial law and then by conducting extensive milestone studies on federalism and electoral systems.

After the end of World War II, in 1946, Ambrosini was elected to the Constitutional Assembly and a key participant of the 18-member committee credited with the actual drafting of the Italian Constitution. He invented and introduced into the Italian Constitution the “regional state”, as an intermediary figure between the federal and the unitary state, in which regions have autonomy under the constitution rather than limited original sovereign power. This type of arrangement was foreshadowed in the Cadiz Constitution of 1812 and was followed in a number of subsequent constitutions including the 1978 Spanish Constitution.

Ambrosini in 1948 was elected to the Chamber of Deputies, where became the Chairman of its Foreign Relations Committee and Colonies. In this capacity he played a key role in advocating Italy's participation in the North Atlantic Treaty Organization and providing political and academic leadership in the creation of the European Community for Steel and Coal and the European Community for Atomic Energy. With his academic assistance, these two entities were conceived along the until-then unknown figure of a “super-national” international entity with limited but own sovereign powers. This novel idea was at the foundation of the subsequent process of integration leading first to the European Economic Communities (EEC) and then to the European Union.

He also championed and justified with the UN the Italian international protectorate over Ethiopia which ended at the end of 1959.

In 1955 Ambrosini was elected by Parliament as a Justice of the Italian Constitutional Court, of which he became the Chief Justice in 1962 holding that position until the end of 1967. He is credited with watershed constitutional decisions which asserted the primacy of the Italian Constitution not only over the laws adopted by the democratic Parliament but also in respect of those passed during the preceding fascist period; as well as the primacy of European law over Italian law. In this latter respect the Italian Constitutional Court opened and paved the path soon followed by the German Constitutional Court and many years later by other European member of the EEC leading to primacy of European law over the law of any member states.

Until his death Ambrosini chaired a government institution which meticulously documented all Italian activities in Africa.

He left behind a rich legacy of more than 50 treaties and books on Italian and comparative constitutional law, international law, history of institutions of government and African studies. At the age of 86, he wrote and published his last treaty comparing the Italian constitution to the principles of the French revolution and the American independence. Having maintained his university tenure for over half a century, he shaped the thinking of three generations of Italian jurists.

== Recognition ==
One of Rome's squares has been dedicated to him.

== Honour ==
- Italy: Knight Grand Cross of the Order of Merit of the Italian Republic (5 June 1956)
