= Witkoppen =

- Location within Gauteng Location within South Africa
- Coordinates: 26.011°S 28.005°E
- Country: South Africa
- Province: Gauteng
- Municipality: City of Johannesburg
- Main Place: Sandton

Area
  - Total: 3.89 km^{2} (1.50 sq mi)

Population (2011)
  - Total: 8,204
  - Density: 2,110/km^{2} (5,460/sq mi)

Racial makeup (2011)
  - Black African: 32.2%
  - Coloured: 2.7%
  - Indian/Asian: 11.3%
  - White: 52.2%
  - Other: 1.5%

First languages (2011)
  - English: 65.5%
  - Afrikaans: 9.9%
  - Zulu: 6.0%
  - Xhosa: 3.4%
  - Other: 15.2%
- Time zone: UTC+2 (SAST)
- Postal code (street): 2191
- PO box: 2068

Witkoppen is a suburb of Sandton, South Africa. The main road is also known as Witkoppen Road.
