= 013NEWS =

South African online newspaper

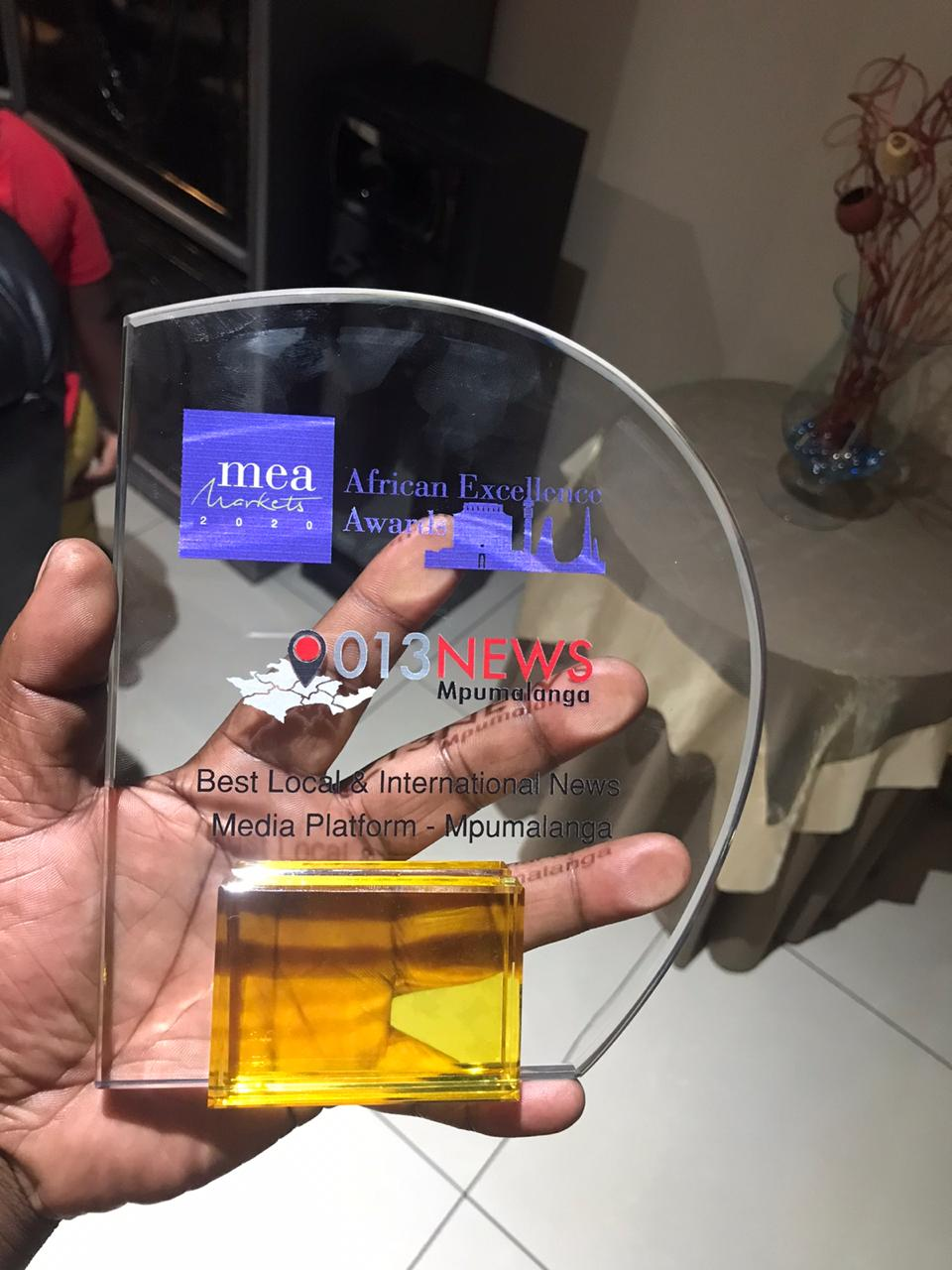
- A MEA Market award, 2020
- Type: Weekday online
- Owner: Mfiso Media Pty Ltd
- Founders: Mpumelelo Mashifane; Martin Spautz; Zama Khumalo
- Founded: 2016 -
- Language: English
- Headquarters: Witbank, Mpumalanga, South Africa
- Website: http://www.013.co.za

013NEWS is a South African provincial online newspaper, published by Mfiso Media in Mpumalanga. It was founded on 1 August 2016 to focus on Mpumalanga news, politics, government, local lifestyle and business. The site is developed by the Southern Sons Group.

The paper was named 2020's best Mpumalanga newspaper by MEA Markets during their African Excellence Awards.

== Legal issues ==
In December 2022, 013NEWS was ordered by the Mbombela High Court to retract two articles that alleged interference by the Minister of Justice and Correctional Services, Ronald Lamola, in the prosecution of former State Security minister Bongani Bongo.

The court instructed the online newspaper to issue a retraction within 24 hours for the articles published on 24 October and 17 November 2022. The first article, written by journalist Zama Khumalo, alleged that Lamola had instructed Henry Nxumalo, a senior state prosecutor living in the minister's vicinity of Bushbuckridge and handling Bongo's matter, to delay the R74 million corruption case against Bongo in order to make sure that Bongo's name does not appear at the ANC’s 55th National Elective Conference. Lamola, denying any involvement in having Bongo not to contest, took legal action against the provincial influential newspaper and filed an urgent interdict of R1 million against 013NEWS, naming Khumalo as the journalist responsible.

013NEWS is owned by Mfiso Media Pty Ltd, a company owned by Mpumelelo Mashifane - with the founding editorial management consisting of Mashifane, Martin Spautz and Khumalo. Although Mashifane as publisher was mentioned as a respondent in the matter but the concern was on Khumalo whose byline appeared on both contested stories.
