= Vladimir Tretchikoff =

Russian painter (1913–2006)

- Владимир Третчиков
- Self-portrait of Tretchikoff
- Born: Vladimir Grigoryevich Tretchikoff; 26 December 1913; Petropavl, Russian Empire
- Died: 26 August 2006 (aged 92); Cape Town, South Africa
- Known for: Painting
- Notable work: Chinese Girl, Alicia Markova "The Dying Swan", Miss Wong, Lady from Orient, Lost Orchid, Weeping Rose, Balinese Girl

Vladimir Grigoryevich Tretchikoff (Russian: Владимир Григорьевич Третчиков, 26 December [O.S. 13 December] 1913 – 26 August 2006) was a Russian-born South African-based artist whose painting Chinese Girl, popularly known as The Green Lady, is one of the best-selling art prints of the twentieth century.

Tretchikoff was a self-taught artist who painted realistic figures, portraits, still life, and animals, with subjects often inspired by his early life in China, Singapore and Indonesia, and later life in South Africa. While his work was immensely popular with the general public, it is often seen by art critics as the epitome of kitsch (indeed, he was nicknamed the "King of Kitsch"). He worked in oil, watercolour, ink, charcoal and pencil but is best known for those works turned into reproduction prints. According to his biographer Boris Gorelik, writing in Incredible Tretchikoff, the reproductions were so popular that it was rumoured that Tretchikoff was the world's richest artist after Picasso.

Red Jacket, a 1998 South African documentary, detailed Tretchikoff's life and work.

== Life and career ==
Vladimir Grigoryevich Tretchikoff was the youngest of eight children in a well-to-do family of partial Russian-Jewish extract in Petropavlovsk (now Petropavl), in what is now Kazakhstan. Upon the Russian Revolution in 1917, the family abandoned their property and fled to Harbin, a city in China with a large Russian presence. Tretchikoff worked as a scene painter at the city's Russian opera house, and went to school until the age of 16. His work as a scene painter may explain why much of his later work is designed to be seen from a distance, and was presented with an inherent theatricality. A year previously, he was commissioned to paint portraits for the boardroom of the Chinese-Eastern Railway, and with the money from this commission he joined the community of Shanghai Russians.

In Shanghai, Tretchikoff worked as an art director and illustrator for Mercury Press, an American-owned advertising and publishing company. At the same time, he contributed cartoons to local Russian and English-language magazines. He met and married Natalie Telpougoff, a fellow Russian émigré. The couple moved to Singapore, where Tretchikoff worked for an advertising agency, gave art lessons, and contributed artwork to the Straits Times. International recognition came in 1937 when he was commissioned by the head of IBM, Thomas Watson, to represent Malaya in an exhibition of international art for which he produced the painting The Last Divers.

When the Second World War spread to the Pacific in 1940, Tretchikoff became a propaganda artist working for the British Ministry of Information. In February 1942, Tretchikoff was on board a ship evacuating ministry personnel to South Africa. The ship was bombed by the Japanese, and the 42 survivors rowed first to Sumatra, which they found was already occupied by the Japanese Army. They then rowed to Java, which took 19 days, only to find that it too was occupied. Tretchikoff was imprisoned in Serang (where he spent three months in solitary confinement for protesting that as a Russian citizen he ought to be set free), and then was released and spent the rest of the war on parole in Batavia, (now Jakarta), where he worked under supervision of a Japanese artist. Here he met Leonora Schmidt-Salomonson (Lenka) who became his lover and one of his most famous models.

In 1946 he was reunited with his wife and their daughter Mimi in South Africa, who both had been successfully evacuated on an earlier boat.

=== Success ===
Tretchikoff quickly became known in South Africa thanks to a book that collected his portraits of Asian women and paintings of flowers, and held successful exhibitions in Cape Town and Johannesburg. He became known in the United States, where the Rosicrucians of San Jose invited him to launch an American tour. Around 57,000 people saw his show in Los Angeles, and 52,000 in San Francisco. In Seattle, a rival show which included Picasso and Rothko was far less attended, to Tretchikoff’s satisfaction. Then he took his show to Canada, where it was also a success. This was followed by a large exhibition in 1962 at Harrods in London, where he decided that the Harrods art gallery was too small to accommodate the crowds. He requested and was granted the privilege of having his exhibition in the ground-floor exhibition space, which was attended by more than 205,000 visitors. One of his British admirers, Leslie Rigall, bought a dozen of his paintings, and designed his new house in Windsor Great Park around them.

His Chinese Girl, a 1952 painting featuring Eastern model, Monika Pon-su-san, with blue-green skin, is one of the best selling prints of the twentieth century. Prints of the painting became widespread during the 1950s and 1960s, and the painting was featured in various plays and television programmes including Alfred Hitchcock's Frenzy (1972) and in several episodes of Monty Python's Flying Circus. Other popular paintings of oriental figures were Miss Wong, Lady from Orient, and Balinese Girl. He said of British prima ballerina assoluta, Alicia Markova, who sat for Alicia Markova "The Dying Swan", that she was his most stimulating sitter.

== Books ==
In 1973, Tretchikoff published his autobiography, Pigeon's Luck, with Anthony Hocking, an account of his wartime experiences. The book was painstakingly researched by Hocking, who contacted people in more than 21 countries.

In 2013, the first complete biography of the artist, Incredible Tretchikoff by Boris Gorelik, was published in London by Art / Books and in Cape Town by Tafelberg.

== Revival ==
Interest in his artworks underwent a resurgence in the late 1990s as part of a revival of 1950s and 1960s retro decor. In 1998 Sotheby's of Johannesburg sold an oil-on-canvas still life for $1800, double what they expected. In 1999 Zulu Maiden was expected to fetch $1800 but went for $10,000. In October 2002 another original fetched $18,000 and in May 2008, Fruits of Bali earned $480,000 at Stephan Welz & Co in Cape Town.

In March 2013 Chinese Girl went for nearly £1,000,000 at Bonhams, surpassing the previous record set by Red Jacket, which had fetched £337,250 in October 2012. In May 2025, South African auctioneers Strauss & Co achieved a new record with the sale of Tretchikoff's 1955 portrait Lady from the Orient for R31,892,000 (US$1,776,017 at the time) to an anonymous buyer.

== Death and legacy ==
Tretchikoff suffered a stroke in 2002 that left him unable to paint, and died on 26 August 2006 in Cape Town, his home since 1946. He was survived by his wife Natalie, his daughter Mimi (b. 1938), four granddaughters and five great-grandchildren. Natalie Tretchikoff died on 18 July 2007.

The South African National Gallery never acquired an original Tretchikoff because they did not "really regard Tretchikoff as a South African artist". In Esme Berman's book, Art and Artists of Southern Africa, he is discussed in little more than two lines, under the heading "popular artists". Tretchikoff once said that the only difference between himself and Vincent van Gogh was that Van Gogh had starved whereas he had become rich.

Illusionist Uri Geller is an admirer of Tretchikoff, in spite of agreeing with critics that his is anything but great art. He wrote, "You put a brick in the Tate today and it's art. Who decided that the Green Lady is kitsch? Not the hundreds of thousands who bought it."

Another admirer of Tretchikoff is fashion designer Wayne Hemingway, who compared him to Andy Warhol. In his book, Just Above The Mantelpiece, which defends popular art, he wrote, "He achieved everything that Andy Warhol stated he wanted to do but could never achieve because of his coolness."

Soon after his death the Tretchikoff Trust was established. The Trust hosts workshops for teenagers throughout South Africa. The Trust is based on Tretchikoff's life motto "Express your passion, do whatever you love, take action, no matter what". In 2011, the first Tretchikoff retrospective was held at the South African National Gallery in Cape Town. Curated by Andrew Lamprecht, it proved to be one of the most successful shows in the gallery's history.

== Documentary ==
- A 1998 South African documentary, Red Jacket, was made about Tretchikoff.

== See also ==
- Bragolin
- Margaret Keane
- Joseph Henry Lynch
- Alicia Markova "The Dying Swan"
