= Fair Lady =

South African women's magazine

Fairlady
- Editor-in-Chief: Suzy Brokensha
- Categories: Women's magazine
- Frequency: Bimonthly
- Founder: Hubert Coetzee
- First issue: 1965; 61 years ago
- Company: Media24
- Country: South Africa
- Based in: Cape Town
- Language: English
- Website: news24.com/life/fairlady
- ISSN: 0014-6927

Fairlady (stylised in all caps), is a South African bimonthly women's magazine that covers fashion, beauty, and lifestyle. Under the control of Naspers from 1965, since 2000 the magazine is published by Naspers subsidiary Media24. Since 2006, Suzy Brokensha has served as editor-in-chief, previous editors include Jane Raphaely, and Dene Smuts, among others.

Based at Media24 Centre in the Foreshore district of Cape Town, Fairlady began publication in 1965. It was published as Fair Lady from the 1970s until 1997.

== Background ==
Fairlady is a South African women's magazine founded by Hubert Coetzee in 1965 as Fairlady (published as Fair Lady from the 1970s until 1997). It is the oldest English-language womens magazine of South African origin in publication.

The magazine is a bimonthly publication, published ten per year for January/February, March/April, May/June, July/August, September/October, and November/December.

=== Editors ===
Editor-in-Chief	Start year	End year
Jane Raphaely	1965	1982
Dene Smuts	c. 1982	1987
Liz Butler		c. 1995
Roz Wrottesley	1995	
Ann Donald	2002	2005
Suzy Brokensha	2006	present

== History ==
In May 2015, Fairlady launched the Women of the Future Awards to recognise successful South African women entrepreneurs.

== Books ==
- The Fairlady Collection: 40 Years of Fine Writing (Jonathan Ball, 2005; edited by Marianne Thamm)
