= Lin Sampson =

South African journalist

- Born: Sri Lanka
- Citizenship: South Africa
- Occupation(s): Journalist, writer

Lin Sampson is a South African journalist who was born in Sri Lanka and educated in England. She has lived all over the world and was the editor of The Athens News. She was most recently a regular columnist for the Sunday Times magazine LifeStyle. Sampson has also been published by local magazines and titles outside South Africa such as The Independent, The Sunday Times and Tatler. In 2005 she published Now You've Gone and Killed Me, a collection of columns dating back to 1982 and with a foreword written by Rian Malan. Sampson is based in Cape Town.
