= Face Value (book) =

1983 book by Jani Allan

- Cover of Face Value
- Author: Jani Allan
- Cover artist: Roger Ingarfield
- Language: English
- Genre: Journalism/Photography
- Publisher: Longstreet
- Publication date: 1983
- Publication place: South Africa
- Media type: Print (Hardback & Paperback)
- Pages: 119
- ISBN: 978-0-620-07013-3
- OCLC: 53125911
- Followed by: Jani Confidential

Face Value is a 1983 anthology of collected journalism by South African journalist Jani Allan. The book is compiled from selections of Allan's successful gossip and popular culture column Just Jani that appeared in the Sunday Times. She was voted "the most admired person in South Africa." in a Gallup poll commissioned by the newspaper. The book was published by Longstreet publishers in Cape Town and released in South Africa in 1983.

== Synopsis ==
The book is a selection of interviews and photographs of public figures from various fields such as entertainment, sport, business, art and politics. Allan also contributed a column-style introduction to each chapter. Andrzej Sawa provided the photographs of the interviewees.

Five of the interviewees (Sol Kerzner, Danie Craven, Pieter-Dirk Uys, Walter Battiss and Taubie Kushlick) were featured in the They shaped our century survey, a top 100 list published about which people had the greatest influence on South Africa during the twentieth century. Sunday Times editor, Tertius Myburgh wrote a foreword for the collection.

=== Author's note ===
"I do not think that for one moment that in a brief interview I can write an accurate-every-time character-revealing piece. But my aim has always been to convey as honestly as I can my first impressions on Face Value, with no 'Ums', 'Ers' or retakes."

== Reception ==
The book received favourable reviews;

"She soon developed a highly individual style and the Jani Allan column, one of the most successful features in Africa's biggest newspaper, followed. She's become a formidable journalist...There's a touch of Tom Wolfe's 'new journalism' about her writing, but it is never contrived. In her choice of subjects she's attracted by what she calls 'the boquet of money' and she's good on those ubiquitous creatures of our time, the 'celebrities', whom she is able to send up without the bitchiness which tends to put me off some lady writers of the adversary school of journalism. When she's touched by something - an individual, a cause, or some little act of valour - her writing reflects immense warmth and humanity." Tertius Myburgh, Editor of the Sunday Times

"Your piece on me acted like a bicycle pump and I mooned around for ages, smiling foolishly and cannoning off the walls. [sic]" Frank Muir

"The only girl who ever knocked me out" Mike Weaver

"Guy Fawkes couldn't brighten up Sunday better." Graham Bell

"She is not destructive - but she does have a particular facility for puncturing pomposity" Joe Sutton

== Contents ==
THE PERPETUAL SPECTACLES 9

- Taubie Kushlick 11
- Joan Brickhill & Louis Burke 13
- Moira Lister 17
- Diane Todd 19

BUSINESS MORE THAN USUAL 21

- Sol Kerzner 22
- Benny Goldberg 26
- Mike Illion 29
- Tony Factor 33

NATIONAL MONUMENTS 37

- Dr Daniel Hartman Craven 29
- Jamie Uys 41
- Siegfried Mynhardt 44
- Patrick Mynhardt 47
- Joe Stewardson 51
- Sonja Herholdt 53

PRETTY BOYS ALL IN A ROW 57

- Richard Loring 58
- Karl Kikillus 60
- James Ryan 62

FUNNY YOU SHOULD SAY THAT ... 67

- Tobie Cronje 69
- Robert Kirby 70
- Katinka Heyns 72
- Pieter-Dirk Uys 75

SPORTING CHANCERS 79

- Naas Botha 80
- Raymond Rhodes 83
- Wynand Classen 85

OLD MASTERS, YOUNG IDEAS 89

- Walter Battiss 90
- Gordon Vorster 93
- Tretchikoff 95

MIXED METAPHORS 101

- John Brett Cohen 103
- The Hell's Angels 105
- Alvon Collinson 109
- Gunter Brözel 111
- Robert Van Tonder 114
- Carole Charlewood 118

== Dictionary ==
Her Just Jani column has been referenced extensively by South African English dictionaries because of Allan's popular use of terms such as jorl, smaak and larney .
