= Bloemfonteinse Stadskouburg =

Theater in Bloemfontein, South Africa

The Bloemfonteinse Stadskouburg is a theater on Markgraaff St in Bloemfontein, South Africa.

== History ==
it was founded on April 15, 1959, as one of the first formal municipal theaters in South Africa. The first performance there was the play Hellersee, by W.A. de Klerk. The Bloemfontein Theater Group and Bloemfontein Repertory Society used the 464-seat venue to host ballet, opera, and drama. It later became the first headquarters of Sukovs (United Arts Society of the Orange Free State).

Among the performances in the Stadskouburg was Frank Staff's ballet based on N. P. van Wyk Louw's poem Raka, the National Theater Company's production of Bridget Boland's The Prisoner starring André Huguenet in his last role in 1961, Mother Courage and Her Children starring Anna Neethling-Pohl in 1973, and Van Wyk Louw's controversial Die Pluimsaad Waai Vêr in 1966, in which he attacked the then Prime Minister, Dr. Hendrik Verwoerd. Although Sukovs later moved to the Sand du Plessis Theatre, the Stadskouburg remains in use, especially by touring and amateur theater companies.

The building has been neglected in recent years.
