= Du Toit =

du Toit is an Afrikaans surname of French origin, originally from François du Toit, a Huguenot who moved to South Africa in 1686. It translates as "of the roof". People with the surname include:

- Alexander du Toit (1878–1948), South African geologist
- Anri du Toit aka Yolandi Visser, South African musician
- Braam du Toit (born 1981), South African composer
- Christiaan du Toit (1901–1982), South African military commander
- Daniel du Toit (1871–1959), South African astronomer
- Dirk du Toit (1943–2009), South African politician
- Elize du Toit (born 1981), South African born, British actress
- Flooi du Toit (1869–1909), South African cricketer
- Francois Jacobus du Toit (1897–1961), South African journalist and economist
- Gaffie du Toit (born 1976), South African rugby union
- Jacob Daniël du Toit (Totius, 1877–1953), South African poet and translator
- Jané du Toit (born 1975), Namibian rugby union footballer
- Lydia Lindeque (1916–1997), South African actor
- Mel du Toit (born 1958), International Creative director
- Natalie du Toit (born 1984), South African swimmer
- Nick du Toit, South African arms dealer
- Paul du Toit (1965–2014), South African artist
- Pieter-Steph du Toit (born 1992), South African rugby union player
- Rachel Alida du Toit (1916–1997), South African actor
- Sarel Petrus du Toit (1864–1930), Second Boer War Boer general
- Simoné du Toit (born 1988), South African shot putter
- Stephanus Jacobus du Toit (1847–1911), South African Afrikaans language pioneer
- Wikus du Toit (born 1972), South African actor
- Donald du Toit (born 1946), is a South African specialist general surgeon, and clinician

== See also ==
- Du Toit Mountains, Antarctica
- Du Toits Peak, Western Cape, South Africa
- Du Toit's torrent frog, Arthroleptides dutoiti, species in the family Petropedetidae
- 57P/du Toit–Neujmin–Delporte, comet
- Du Toitcrater, on Mars
- Dutoitia, a genus of Devonian rhyniophyte, named after the South African geologist Alex du Toit
