= André Huguenet =

South African actor

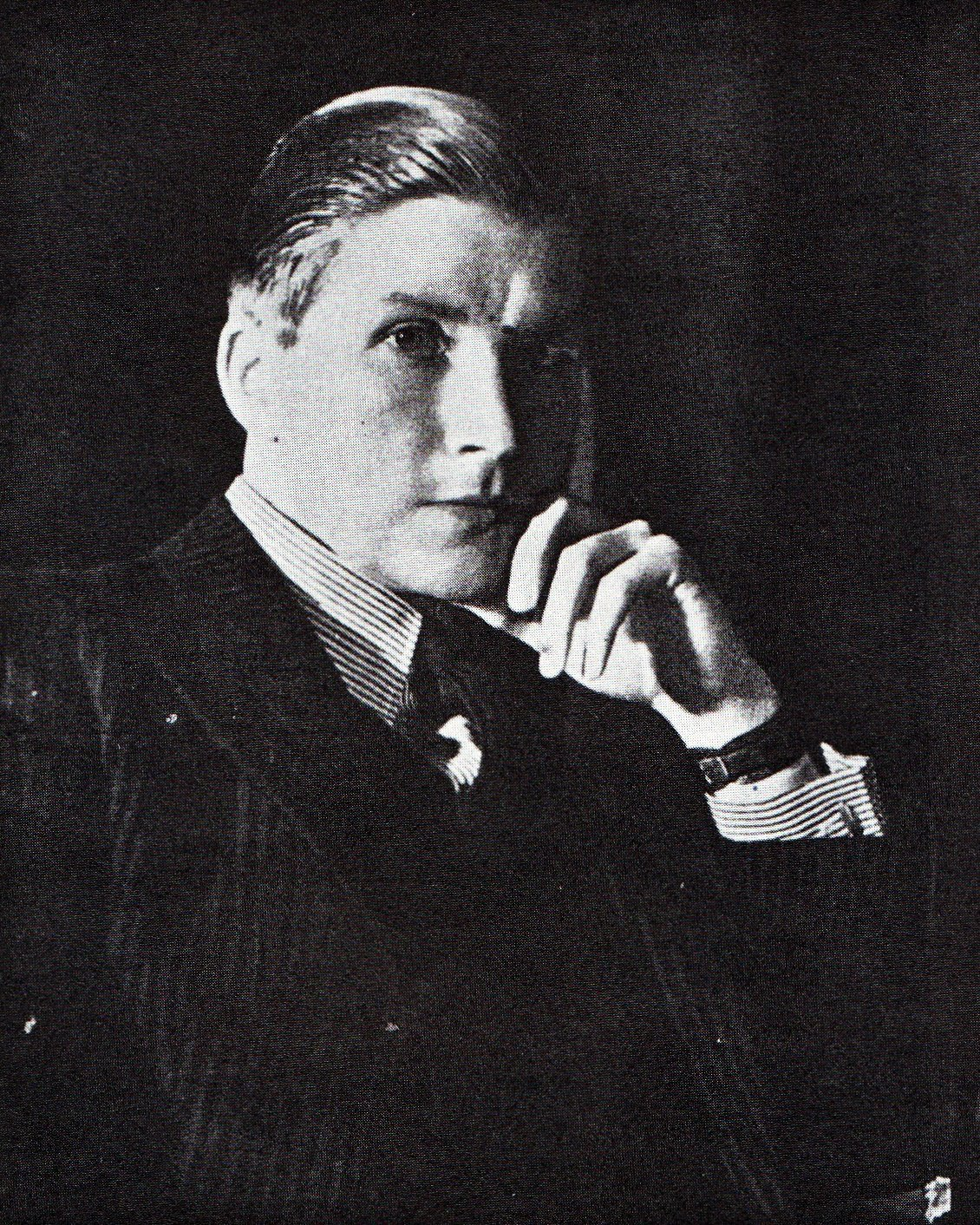
- Born: Gerhardus Petrus André Huguenet Borstlap; 22 October 1906; Bloemfontein
- Died: 15 June 1961 (aged 54); Bloemfontein
- Occupation: Actor

André Huguenet (1906 – 1961) was the stage name of the actor Gert Borstlap. Huguenet was a pioneer in Afrikaans acting. Some of the well-known Afrikaans actors who worked with Huguenet were Wena Naudé, Lydia Lindeque, Siegfried Mynhardt, Hendrik Hanekom, Mathilda Hanekom, Anna Neethling-Pohl, Emgee Pretorius and Hermien Dommisse.

Huguenet was born Gerhardus Petrus Borstlap in Bloemfontein on 22 October 1906. He grew up there and matriculated at Grey College in 1925, after which he worked as a journalist in Bloemfontein and Pretoria. He soon left the newspaper world for the stage and joined Paul de Groot's theatre company in 1926. He would tour with De Groot's company for six years, after which he founded his own theatre company.

He is best remembered for his roles in Oedipus Rex (with Athol Fugard and directed by Taubie Kushlick), Tartuffe and Ipekonders, Poppehuis, Ghosts, Minnaar onder die wapen and various Shakespeare plays such as Hamlet, Macbeth and King Lear. Huguenet performed Hamlet in Afrikaans in Johannesburg and Pretoria in 1947 to celebrate his 21st jubilee. At the end of the performance, he addressed the audience and said that it had been his lifelong ambition to perform one of the world's best tragedies in the world's youngest language. The play, written in 1945, was first performed by Huguenet and is seen as a milestone in the history of the Afrikaans theatre world. In 1948, Huguenet, together with Anna Neethling-Pohl, received an Honorary Medal for Theatre Arts from the South African Academy of Science and Arts. King Lear is a translation by Uys Krige commissioned by the then Kruikbestuur, for which he received the SA Academy's prize for translated work in 1971.

In 1948 Huguenet entered the service of the National Theatre Organisation and two years later his autobiography, Applous! die kronieke van ’n dramateller, was published, about his 25 years of Afrikaans acting. In 1953 he was a guest of honour of the British Council at the Festival of Britain in London.

Huguenet was known for his temper: one of the anecdotes about him is that one night, when a baby was screaming incessantly, he interrupted the performance, came forward, and defiantly ordered: "Madam, will you please remove your screaming scrap from the hall."

He was found dead in his sister's house in Bloemfontein on 15 June 1961. Today it is generally accepted that he was gay.

== Filmography ==
- Die Bubbles Schroeder Storie, 1961
- Paul Krüger, 1956 as Sir Theophilus Shepstone
- Inspan, 1953 as Piet Jordaan
- Hans-die-Skipper, 1952 as Hans-die-Skipper
