= Wena Naudé =

South African actress

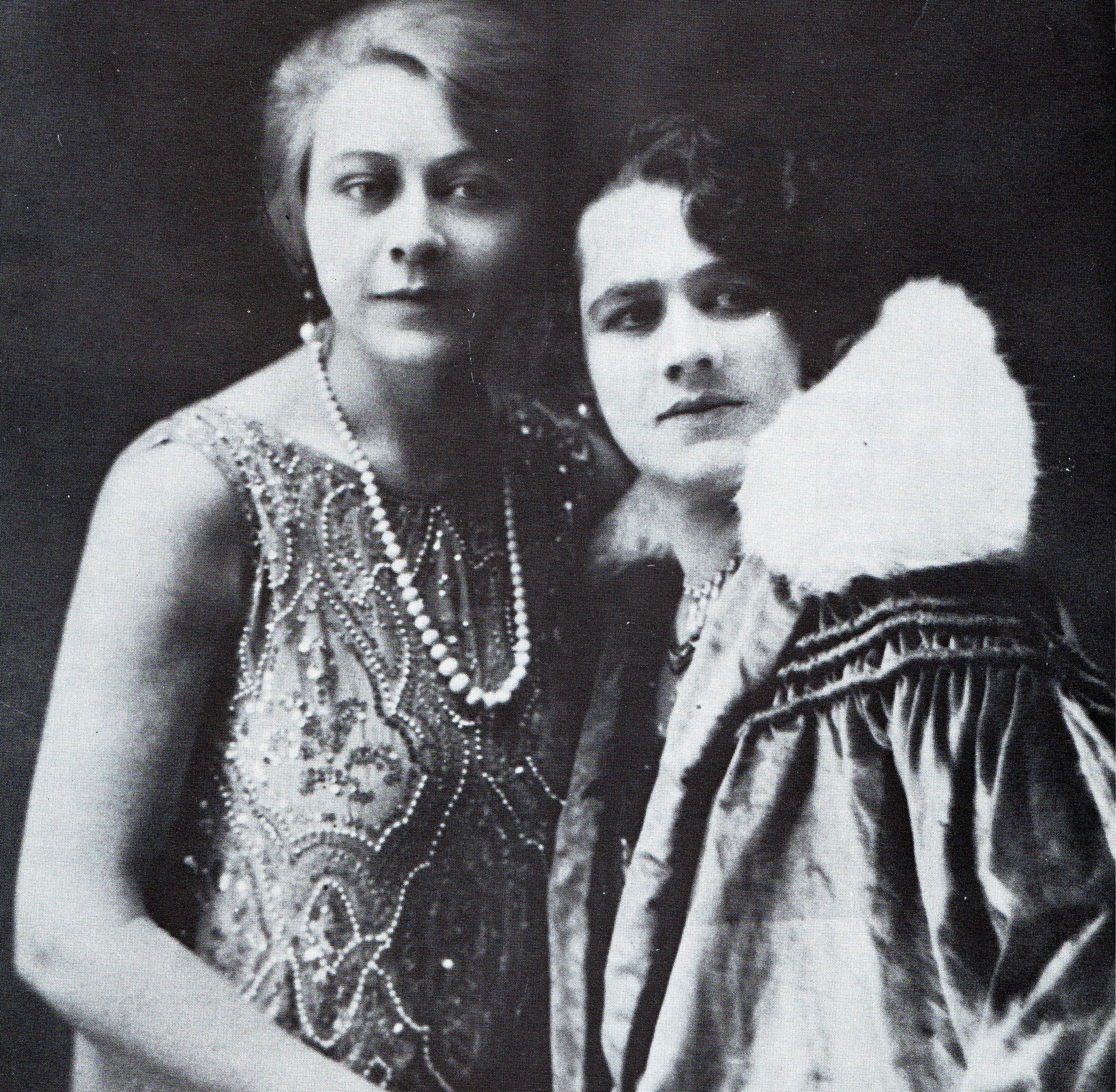
- Naudé (left) and Mathilda Hanekom in 1929.
- Born: Agnes Alwena Naudé; 31 December 1905; Wakkerstroom
- Died: 6 September 1978 (aged 72); Pretoria
- Occupation: Actor

Agnes Alwena (Wena) Naudé (31 December 1905 – 6 September 1978) was an Afrikaans actress. She was one of the pioneers of Afrikaans theatre.

== Early life and career ==
Naudé went to school in Volksrust and Lydenburg, after which she worked in a bicycle shop in Pretoria. In her free time, she took speech lessons from Stephanie Faure and took the final exam in 1924. She then received further acting training from Paul de Groot, whose theatre company she joined. In July 1925 they undertook a theatrical tour with 'Huistoe' (Heimat van Sudermann) and in January 1926 with 'Oorskotjie' (Nicodemi).

She was, among others, a member of the companies of Hendrik Hanekom and André Huguenet who travelled from town to town with their plays. In 1954 she received the Medal of Honor for Theatre from the Suid-Afrikaanse Akademie vir Wetenskap en Kuns.

Naudé was married to Willem van Zyl. They had a daughter, Nilo. In 1940 they divorced and in 1943 she married Johan Pretorius Pienaar, a brother of Sangiro. In 1947 she also divorced Johan. She has 3 grandchildren, namely Alwena van der Westhuizen, Riana Jeffery and Wilna van Gass. Her daughter, Nilo Mostert, occasionally performed one-man plays at small functions until her death (11 March 2016). Wena also has 5 great-grandchildren, namely Sonja, (deceased), Carl and Riani van der Westhuizen as well as Lindie and Stephnie van Gass.

== Filmography ==
Since 1947, she has acted in more than thirty South African films. Some of them are:

Film	Year	Director
Sarie Marais	1947	Joseph Albrecht
Hans-die-Skipper	1953	Bladon Peake
Inspan	1953	Bladon Peake
Paul Krüger	1956	Werner Grünbauer
Basie	1961	Gordon Vorster
As Ons Twee Eers Getroud Is	1962	
Die Tweede Slaapkamer	1962	Gordon Vorster
Die Skelm van die Limpopo	1962	Gerrie Snyman
Kavaliers	1966	
Hoor My Lied	1967	Elmo de Witt
Oupa for Sale	1968	Richard Daneel
Dr. Kalie	1968	Ivan Hall
Salomien	1972	Daan Retief
Cry Me a Teardrop	1974	Keith van der Wat
Tant Ralie se Losieshuis	1974	Dirk de Villiers
Die troudag van tant Ralie	1975	Dirk de Villiers
Boland!	1974	Bertrand Retief
Die Sersant en die Tiger Moth	1974	Koos Roets
Boland	1974	Bertrand Retief
Jakkalsdraai se Mense	1975	
Soekie	1975	Daan Retief
Dingetjie Is Dynamite	1975	
Troudag van Tant Ralie	1975	Ivan Hall
Ma Skryf Matriek	1975	Franz Marx
Daar Kom Tant Alie	1976	
