= Paula Styger =

South African actress

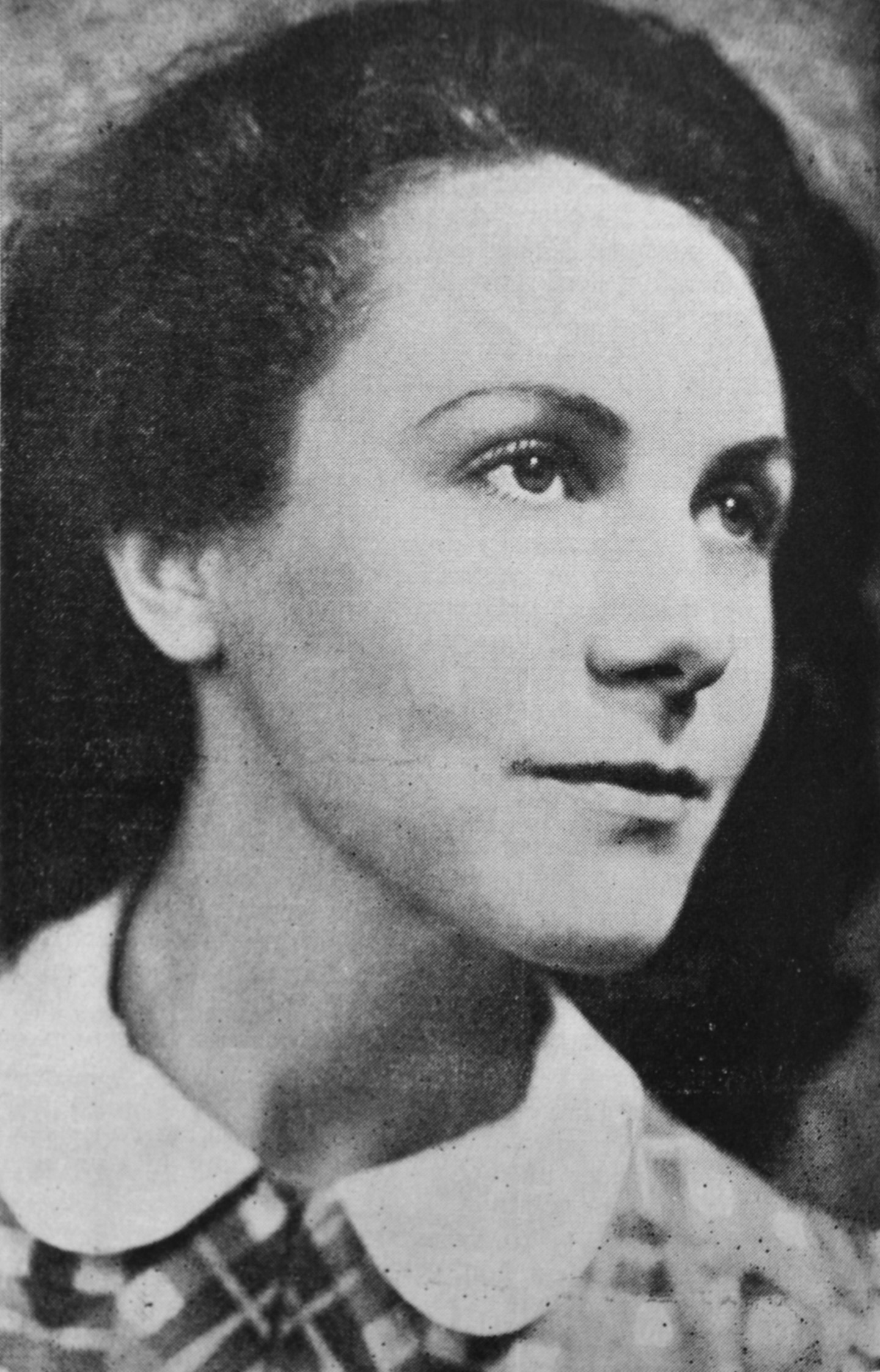
- Born: Anna Maria Styger; 26 February 1913; Burgersdorp
- Died: 22 February 2000 (aged 87)
- Occupation: Actress

Paula Styger (26 February 1913 – 22 February 2000) was a South African actress, journalist and advertising executive. She made her stage debut in 1935 in André Huguenet's play Haar egskeiding. This was followed by Gevaarlike huwelik in 1935, Die Kwaksalwer in 1939, Ek het 'n man mormervoor and Helshoogte saam met hom. In 1942 she joined the Pierre de Wet company, with James Norval and Anna Cloete, and performed in stage productions such as Pinkie (1942–1943) and Satansloon (1942). In 1944, after a serious operation, she bid farewell to the stage and concentrated on commercial art and the marketing sector. However, she did appear in Pierre de Wet's films.

== Filmography ==
- Vicki, 1970
- Nooi van my Hart, 1959 as Ms. Dixon
- Vadertjie Langbeen, 1955 as Paula de Villiers
- Die kaskenades van Dr. Kwak, 1948
- Pinkie se erfenis, 1944
