= Paul de Groot (actor) =

Indonesian South African actor

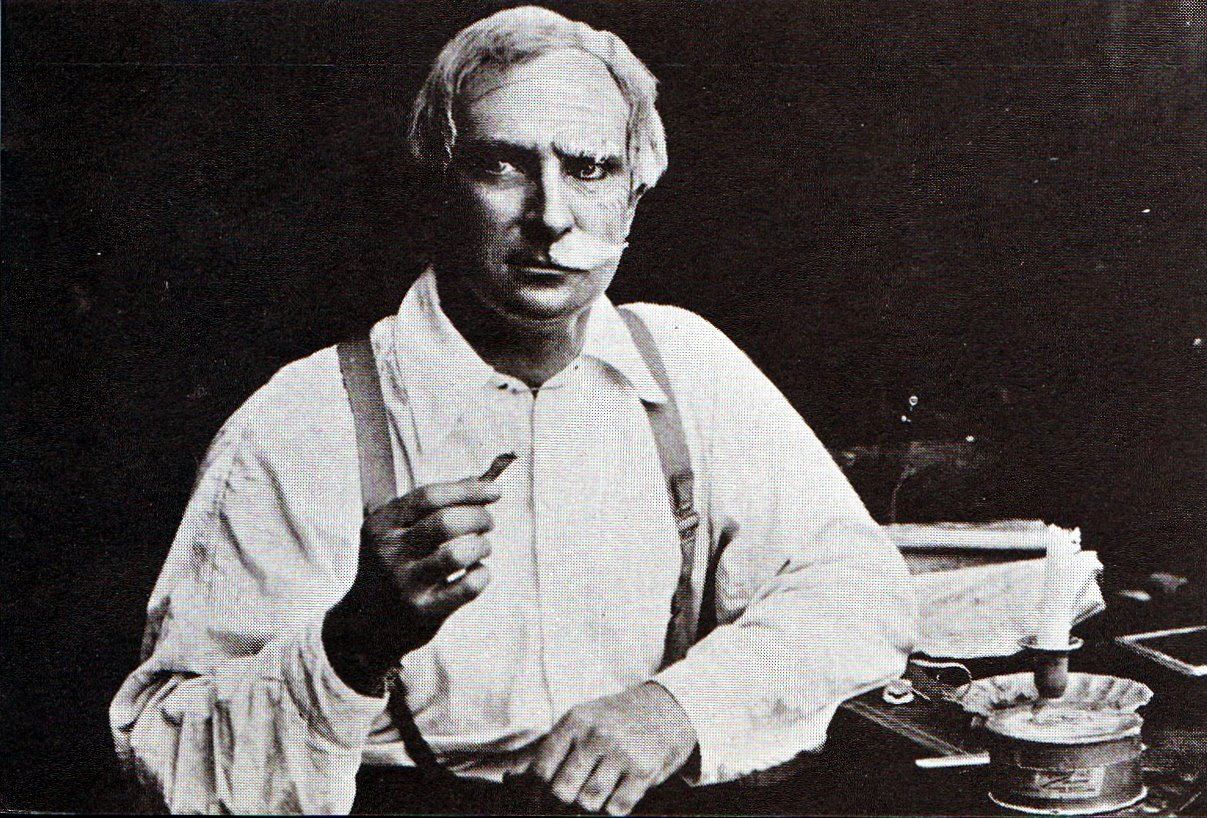
- Born: Paul Christiaan de Groot; 11 January 1878; Soerabaja, Java, Dutch East Indies
- Died: 10 May 1940 (aged 62); Dutch East Indies
- Occupation: Actor

Paul Christiaan de Groot (11 January 1878 – presumably 10 May 1940) is considered by many to be the father of African drama. He was a professional actor who, in the early days of traveling theater companies, played an important role in establishing a professional Afrikaans professional theater culture.

== Life and work ==
Paul Christiaan de Groot was born on January 11, 1878 in Surabaya, in what was then the Dutch East Indies (currently Indonesia). Little is known about him, but he himself said that his father was a military man and his mother a French singer. He studied at the acting school in Amsterdam and worked under famous stage directors. The most complete information about De Groot's life and career as an actor can be found in Anna Minnaar-Vos's The Game continues, while the Esat website and ESAT also provide useful information. André Huguenet's autobiography (Applause! The chronicles of an actor) contains detailed information about their joint performances.

== In South Africa ==
On 28 October 1924, De Groot landed in South Africa. He first gave lectures in Cape Town and then performed works that he translated himself. Later he teamed up with Hendrik and Mathilda Hanekom and his plays took on a truly African touch. His first performance in Afrikaans was in The Witch by C. Louis Leipoldt.

Some of the most famous African actors worked under him, such as the Hanekoms, Wena Naudé, Lydia Lindeque and Siegfried Mynhardt.

In 1935 he returned abroad. In 1940 he left on a tour to India and presumably died during the Japanese occupation.

== Filmography ==
- Alexandra, 1922
- Was She Guilty?, 1922
- De man zonder hart, 1937

== Sources ==
- .Binge, L.W.B., Ontwikkeling van die Afrikaanse Toneel (1832–1950)
- Huguenet, André. Applous! Die kronieke van ’n toneelspeler. HAUM Kaapstad, 1950.
- Kannemeyer, J.C. Geskiedenis van die Afrikaanse literatuur 1. Academica, Pretoria en Kaapstad. Tweede druk, 1984.
- Minnaar-Vos, Anna. Die spel gaan voort. Tafelberg-Uitgewers. Beperk Kaapstad, 1969.
- Van Coller, H.P. (red.) Perspektief en Profiel Deel I. J.L. van Schaik-Uitgewers. Pretoria. Eerste uitgawe, 1998.
