= Nathan Berg =

Canadian opera singer

- Bass-baritone Nathan Berg

Background information
- Born: Spalding, Saskatchewan, Canada
- Genres: Classical, adult contemporary, opera, Vocal
- Occupations: Opera singer, classical musician
- Instrument: Vocals
- Years active: 1993–present
- Labels: ATMA Classique, Harmonia Mundi, Virgin, Telarc, Erato
- Website: NathanBerg.com

Nathan Berg (born in Spalding, Saskatchewan, Canada) is an operatic bass-baritone. He is a Grammy Award winner (2018 Best Opera Recording) and four-time Grammy nominated, a Juno award winner (2002 JUNO award classical album category – vocal or choral performance) and 2014 Juno Awards nominee

== Career ==
After some studies at the University of Western Ontario and the Maîtrise nationale de Versailles, Nathan Berg carried out the majority of his formal musical training at the Guildhall School of Music and Drama in London, England studying with legendary pedagogue Vera Rózsa. While at the Guildhall School, he won prizes in the Kathleen Ferrier Competition, the Royal Overseas League, Peter Pears Competition, Walter Gruner International Lieder Competition and the Guildhall's gold medal for Singers joining a list of singers that includes Bryn Terfel and Benjamin Luxon.

The English journalist Bernard Levin once wrote of the young Nathan Berg in The Times: "A Canadian baritone, Nathan Berg by name, with a voice not only powerful and full of meaning, but of such velvet beauty that the comparison cannot be avoided: surely the young Fischer-Dieskau sounded like this.".

Canadian Opera Singer Nathan Berg

Berg began his career with Handel's Messiah in Paris in December 1992, and quickly became known for his contributions in Early to Classical music periods in opera and concert. Highlights from his earlier career include performances and recordings with French early music group Les Arts Florissants with whom he recorded often (see recording list below). He also recorded Dvorak's Stabat Mater with the late Robert Shaw and the Atlanta Symphony (which proved to be Shaw's final recording), and a German Lieder disc with pianist Julius Drake.

In recent years has established himself as a specialist in the works of Wagner. In 2023/2024 he performed his first complete Ring des Nibelungen as Wotan at Theater Basel. In 2016, he debuted as Alberich in Das Rheingold with the Minnesota Opera. In 2018 Mr. Berg returned to the role of Holländer at the Cincinnati Opera Festival, Alberich in Das Rheingold with Opéra de Montréal and made his debut as Wotan in Das Rheingold at the Badisches Staatstheatre, Karlsruhe, Germany and Alberich in Siegfried at the National Taichung Theater, Taiwan. He also covered the roles of Alberich in the Metropolitan Opera's complete Ring in the 18/19 season.

In 2013, Nathan debuted at Moscow's Bolshoi Opera in the title role of Wagner's Flying Dutchman and returned to New York's Carnegie hall in Haydn's Creation with Roger Norrington. In the same season Mr. Berg performed with the Houston Symphony in Berg's Wozzeck and the Valencia's Palau de les Arts in Mozart's Magic Flute. In 2014, he had his concert debut in the role of Alberich (Wagner's Reingold) with Myung-Whun Chung conducting. In 2015, Mr. Berg made his debut at the Teatro Alla Scala, Milan in the world premier of Battistelli's opera CO_{2}. In 2016, he premiered in the role of Bluebeard in Bartók's Bluebeard's Castle directed by Mariusz Treliński (co-production with the Metropolitan Opera, New York) at the Polish National Opera, Warsaw and the role of Vodnik in Dvořák's Rusalka at the National Center for the Performing Arts, Beijing. In yet another stage debut in 2016 Nathan "made a star turn, from beginning to end, as a grumpy and grizzled Albrecht" in Minnesota Opera's Rheingold. In 2017 Nathan had his debut at the Salzburg Festival alongside Bartoli in Handel's Ariodante and Rossini's La Donna del Lago.

His career has moved among recital, concert and opera. In recital, he has appeared at the Wigmore Hall in London, Lincoln Center in New York, Musée d'Orsay in Paris, BBC Radio Studios in London, the Aix-en-Provence Festival in France, the Winspear Centre in Canada and the Edinburgh Festival in Scotland. with pianists Graham Johnson, Julius Drake, Roger Vignoles, Michael McMahon and Martin Katz. Mr. Berg's early work in concert and opera concentrated on Early Music and Classical. He has since also engaged in Romantic and later with recent operatic debuts as Wagner's Dutchman, and Alberich, Puccini's Scarpia and Bartok's Bluebeard and in concert with Mahler's Kindertotenlieder. A bass-baritone with "a first-class voice" (Boston Globe), he has worked with conductors including Abbado, Boulez, Davis, Dohnányi, Hogwood, Jacobs, Jurowski, McGegan, Mackerras, Nelson, Spano, Zukerman, Masur, Dutoit, Salonen, Eschenbach, Hogwood, Maazel, Marlot, Norrington, Slatkin, Christie, Herreweghe, Tortelier, Leppard, Rilling, Haenchen, Ozawa, Welser-Möst and Tilson Thomas. He has performed in concert with major orchestras such as the New York Philharmonic, Cleveland Symphony, Berlin Philharmonic, Chicago Symphony, San Francisco Symphony, National Symphony (Washington), Los Angeles Philharmonic, Atlanta Symphony, Boston Symphony, Montreal Symphony, National Arts Centre Orchestra, Toronto Symphony, Colorado Symphony, St Paul Chamber Orchestra, St Louis Symphony, Handel and Haydn Society, Seattle Symphony, Orchestra of St. Luke's, Minnesota Orchestra, Philadelphia Orchestra, Houston Symphony, London Philharmonic, Orchestra of the Age of Enlightenment, Les Arts Florissants, City of Birmingham Symphony Orchestra, Freiburg Baroque, Les Talens Lyriques, Concert d’Astree, English Chamber Orchestra, BBC Symphony, Budapest Festival Orchestra, Gulbenkian Orchestra, Israel Philharmonic, Singapore Symphony, São Paulo Symphony and Concertgebouw Orchestra. Apart from these orchestras' home concert halls his performances have also taken place at prestigious venues and festivals such as Carnegie Hall, the Hollywood Bowl, The Saratoga Festival, Tanglewood, The Grant Park Festival in Chicago, and Vienna's Musikverein. Among his operatic work he has appeared in Mozart's Figaro, Don Giovanni, Guglielmo and Leporello (a role which Berg won the 2005–2006 Austin Critics Table Awards award for Best Male Singer), Puccini's Scarpia, Marcello and Coline, Wagner's Dutchman, Verdi's Ferrando, Rossini's Alidoro, Rameau's Huascar and multiple Handel roles (for example, Hercules, Zoroastro, Achilla) in such places as Bolshoi, Glyndebourne, Paris National Opera, Netherlands Opera, La Monnaie, New York City Opera, English National Opera, Welsh National Opera, Aix-en-Provence Festival, Théâtre des Champs-Élysées Teatro Verdi in Trieste, Opéra de Dijon, Opéra de Lyon, Royal Swedish Opera, Théâtre du Capitole in Toulouse, Opéra de Lille, Vancouver Opera, Calgary Opera, Edmonton Opera, Austin Lyric, Arizona Opera, Utah Opera, Opéra de Nice, and the Bavarian State Opera.

Nathan Berg

Berg is an established recording artist with over thirty CD and DVD recordings to his name. In 2015, he was featured in releases of Rameau's Les Indes Galantes with the Bordeaux National Opera (DVD/BLU-RAY) and a new recording of Dvořák's Requiem with Philippe Herrewege and the Royal Flemish Philharmonic. He has recently appeared on a DVD releases of Lully's Armide conducted by William Christie and directed by Robert Carson and the 2011 production of Handel's Giulio Cesare (Opera National de Paris with Natalie Dessay conducted by Emmanuelle Haim). In 2012, he appeared as bass soloist on a recording of Beethoven's 9th Symphony with Michael Tilson Thomas and the San Francisco Symphony (released in 2013), and recorded the role of Zoroastro in Handel's Orlando with Pacific Baroque released by ATMA Classique (2014 Juno award nominee) also in 2013. A few examples of earlier celebrated recordings featuring Nathan Berg are his 2005 Janáček's Glagolitic Mass with the Chicago Symphony conducted by Pierre Boulez, 1999 Dvořák Stabat Mater with Robert Shaw and the Atlanta Symphony (Robert Shaw's last recording), 2002 Mozart's Requiem with Les Violons du Roy and his 1994 Messiah with Les Arts Florissants and William Christie.

== Nathan Berg's recordings ==
- 1994: Handel's Messiah with Les Arts Florissants
- 1994: Bouzignac Te Deum, Motets with Les Arts Florissants
- 1995: Mozart Requiem with Les Arts Florissants
- 1995: Purcell's Dido and Aeneas with Les Arts Florissants
- 1995: Othmar Schoeck Lieder with Orchestra (Novalis B0000260FH) with English Chamber Orchestra
- 1996: Othmar Schoeck Lieder Complete Edition Volume 2 (Jecklin Edition JD 672–2) with pianist Julius Drake
- 1997: The Hyperion Schubert Edition 29 (Schubert, Einsamkeit) with pianist Graham Johnson
- 1997: Othmar Schoeck Lieder Complete Edition volume 6 (Jecklin B0000260FH)
- 1997: Rameau's Hippolyte et Aricie with Les Arts Florissants
- 1998: Mendelssohn: Songs and Duets Vol 1 with Sophie Daneman and Eugene Asti
- 1999: Dvorak Stabat Mater with Robert Shaw and the Atlanta Symphony (Grammy nominated – 2000 Best classical Album)
- 2000: Bach, Mass in B Minor, BWV 232 with Boston Baroque (Grammy nominated – 2001 Best Choral Performance)
- 2002: Mozart's Requiem with Violin de Roy (2002 JUNO award classical album category – vocal or choral performance)
- 2003: Handel's Theodora (Valens) with Les Arts Florissants(Theodora_(Handel)/notable recording)
- 2003: Rameau's Zoroastre (Abramane) with Les Arts Florissants (Grammy nominated)
- 2004: Beethoven Symphony 9 with Jaap Van Zweden and the Residentie Orchestra
- 2005: Monteverdi: L'incoronazione di Poppea with Netherlands Opera (recorded in 1994) (DVD)
- 2005: A Tribute to Pierre Boulez (Janáček's Glagolitic Mass with the Chicago Symphony conducted by Pierre Boulez)
- 2005: Rameau's Les Indes Galantes with Opera National de Paris (DVD)
- 2006: Rossini's Cenerentola (Alidoro) at Glyndebourne Festival directed by Sir Peter Hall (DVD/BLU-RAY)
- 2007: Mozart's Don Giovanni (Masetto) at Aix en Provence Festival (DVD/BLU-RAY) (recorded in 2002)
- 2008: Lieder Recital – Schubert, Schumann, Brahms, Strauss with pianist Julius Drake
- 2009: Handel's Messiah with Washington National Cathedral
- 2010: Mozart Mass in C minor with Handel and Haydn Society
- 2011: Lully's Armide (Hidraot) with Theatre de Champs-Élysées, Paris (DVD/BLU-RAY)
- 2012: Handel's Giulio Cesare (Achilla) with Opera National de Paris (DVD/BLU-RAY)
- 2013: Beethoven's 9th Symphony with Michael Tilson Thomas and the San Francisco Symphony
- 2013: Handel's Orlando (Zoroastro) with Alexander Weimann and the Pacific Baroque Orchestra (2014 JUNO nomination classical album category – vocal or choral performance)
- 2015:Dvorák Requiem with Philippe Herreweghe, Collegium Vocale Gent and the Royal Flemish Philharmonic
- 2015:Les Indes Galantes (Huascar) with Bordeaux National Opera (DVD/BLU-RAY)
- 2016:Tamerlano (Leone) with La Monnaie (BLU-RAY)
- 2017:Wozzeck (Doctor) with Houston Symphony (winner of 2017 Echo Klassik for best opera recording and 2018 Grammy nominated)
