= James Norval =

James Norval may refer to:

- James Norval (businessman)
- James Norval (actor)
