= Andrzej Sawa =

Polish-South African photographer (born 1941)

- Born: Andrzej Sawa; 1941 (age 84–85); Poland
- Known for: Photography

Andrzej Sawa (born 1941) is a Polish-South African photographer.

== Early life ==
Sawa was born in Poland and was taken to a German labour camp in 1943 and lived there with his mother and grandmother until the end of the Second World War in 1945. Both Sawa's paternal and maternal grandfathers were Roman Catholics and were murdered in Auschwitz concentration camp.

He admits that his love for photography began when The Family of Man photographic exhibition came to Poland in 1956, coinciding with the time he was given his first camera, by his grandmother.

Sawa obtained an engineering degree in Poland but later began freelancing for newspapers and shot stills for the local television broadcaster before joining the broadcaster as a cameraman, although in his heart he remained a photographer.

In 1970, Sawa emigrated to South Africa, working in electronics at STC. While there, he freelanced as a photographer for South Africa's Sunday Times newspaper.

== Career ==
He later took on a two-year freelance photographer position at the Johannesburg Sunday Times covering sports events. At the end of the tenure, he was given a full-time position at the newspaper. From the early-mid 1970s he was assigned to the Sunday Times Colour Magazine, but was moved to the main newspaper when the magazine was closed. He continued photographing features for the newspaper, covering the Miss South Africa beauty pageant between 1974 and 1983. Between 1981 and 1992 he published photographs for the relaunched Sunday Times Colour Magazine.

In the 1980s, he worked closely alongside the newspaper's columnist, Jani Allan. As the paper's chief photographer, he photographed her celebrity interviewees with popular personalities. His photographs were later compiled in Face Value, a book of Allan's interview columns accompanied by full-page photographs taken by Sawa.

He also worked with Allan and other journalists on assignments for the newspaper with international celebrity figures.

He was also the only photographer outside of National Geographic permitted to photograph the relocation of animals at Etosha National Park in Namibia.

Outside the magazine, he shot two LP covers for the band Queen. Queen's lead singer Freddie Mercury had seen Sawa's work when in South Africa and called him to ask him to collaborate on the covers.

Sawa also worked for Flying Springbok, the inflight magazine of South Africa's national airline, South African Airways, from 1987 to 2007, specialising in travel and wildlife photography. During this time he visited 70 countries.

He published his first solo photography book, Children of South Africa, in 1993.

He has been honoured with fellowships from three different photographic societies; the Royal Photographic Society of Great Britain (1987); the Photographic Society of Southern African (1987); and the Professional Photographers of Southern Africa (1997).

== Publications ==
- Allan, Jani, Face Value, Longstreet, Cape Town, 1980s, ISBN 0-620-07013-7 (inside photographs)
- Sawa, Andrzej, Children of South Africa, Southern Book Publishers, South Africa, 1993, ISBN 1-86812-422-3
- Snyman, Lannice, Sawa, Andrzej, Johnson, Vaughan, Reflections of the South African Table, S & S Publishers, South Africa, 1995, ISBN 0-620-19199-6
- Snyman, Lannice, Sawa, Andrzej, South African Family Favourites, Publisher Don Nelson, 1996, ISBN 9781868061365
- Roberts, Margaret, Weber, Rita, Sawa, Andrzej, Herbs and Spices Cookbook, Southern Book Publishers, South Africa, 1998, ISBN 1-86812-483-5
- Snyman, Lannice & Sawa, Andrzej, Rainbow Cuisine, S&S Publishers, South Africa, 1998, ISBN 0-620-22354-5
- Snyman, Lannice & Sawa, Andrzej, Gourmet Hideaways, S&S Publishers, South Africa, 2000, ISBN 0-620-25924-8
- Snyman, Lannice & Sawa, Andrzej, Rainbow Cuisine, Konemann, South Africa, 2001, ISBN 3-8290-5903-5 (2nd edition)
- De Koster, Carolié & Sawa, Andrzej, Snack-style Food, Lapa, South Africa, 2004, ISBN 0-7993-3206-2
- De Koster, Carolié & Sawa, Andrzej, Keur Kos vir Elke Dag, LAPA Uitgewers, 2004, ISBN (pending)
- De Koster, Carolié & Sawa, Andrzej, Kies Gesond: Resepte vir Elke Dag, LAPA Uitgewers, 2009, ISBN 9780799342796
