= John Matisonn =

South African political journalist and author

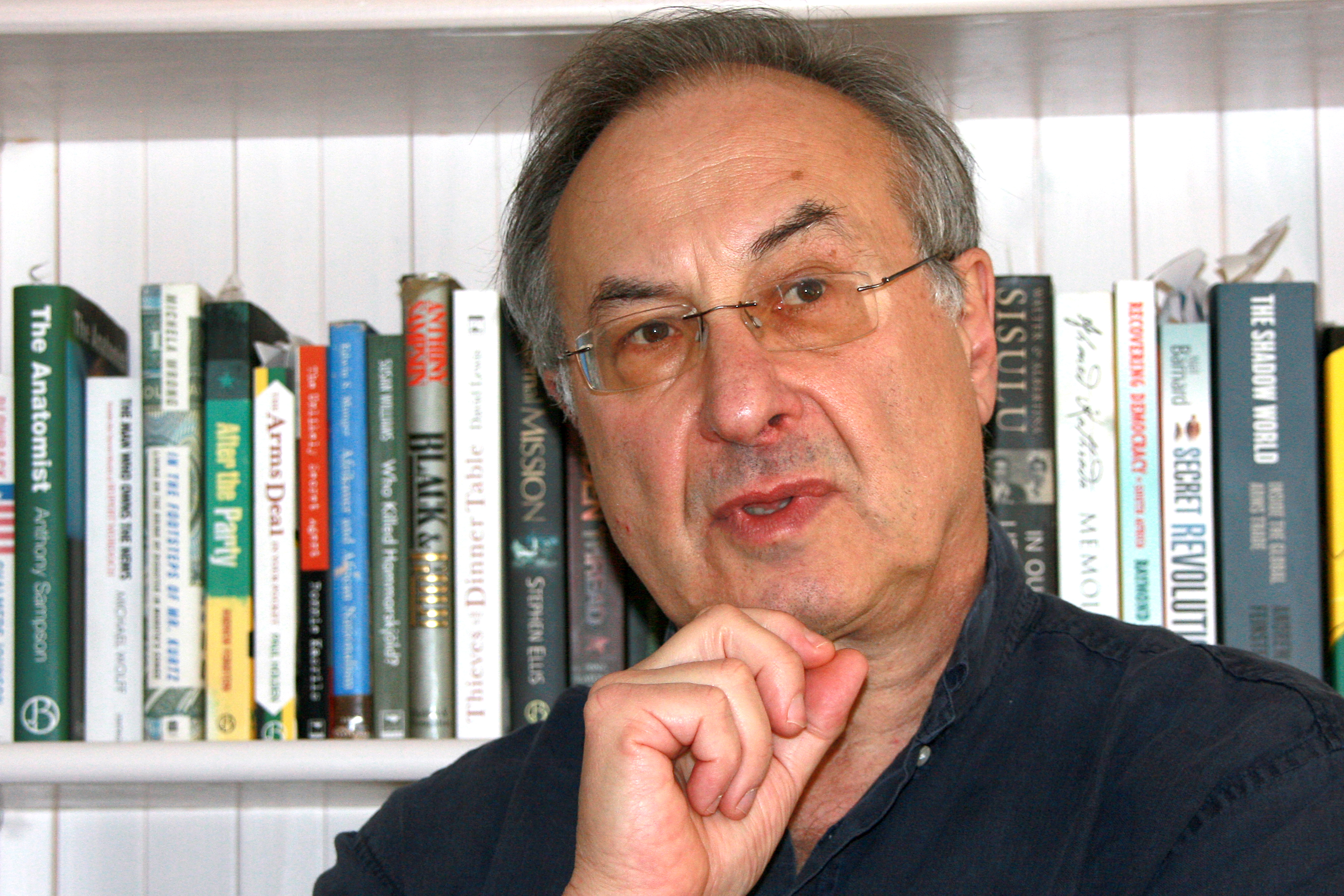
- Born: 30 December 1949 (age 76); Johannesburg, South Africa
- Education: University of Witwatersrand; University of Chicago
- Presenting career
- Network: NPR
- Country: South Africa

John Matisonn is a South African political journalist and author. He was one of the founding councillors of South Africa's Independent Broadcasting Authority and from 1986 to 1991 was the South Africa correspondent for National Public Radio in the United States.

== Career ==
=== Early career, imprisonment ===
Matisonn grew up in the suburbs in Johannesburg and began his career as a political journalist on the Rand Daily Mail. In 1979, when South Africa was under the Apartheid regime, he was sentenced to two weeks in jail for refusing to reveal his sources for an article which led to exposure of the Muldergate Scandal. He resigned as president of the Southern African Society of Journalists and left for the United States where he became the Washington correspondent for six South African newspapers. Matisonn was given a presidential pardon by President P W Botha on the day he was to fly back from Washington to South Africa to serve his sentence.

=== Post-apartheid ===
At the dawn of South Africa's first democratic elections in 1994, he was the Executive Editor for Elections at the national broadcaster, SABC Radio. He co-founded the PBI, Public Broadcasting Initiative, a South African think-tank and training centre for public broadcasting, to train and recruit South African journalists for the SABC to teach them about balance and fairness in the media.

Matisonn chaired the founding meeting Free, Fair and Open, South Africa in the Transition to Democracy (1992) whose resolutions were adopted by CODESA.

From 2002 to 2004 Matisonn helped launch and run the South African edition of THISDAY newspaper in the post of editorial director.

He was sent by the United Nations to be the Chairperson of the Electoral Media Commission in Afghanistan in 2005, returning to the country to work for the UN as until 2010 in more senior roles.

Matisonn released a book God, Spies and Lies, Finding South Africa's future through its past in November 2015. The book contains many revelations about how South Africa finds itself in its current political predicament based on never before documented discussions with important role players, in the fight against white minority rule. The book names Tertius Myburgh a former editor of The Sunday Times for the first time as an apartheid agent.

Matisonn broke the story of how South African experts through then President Thabo Mbeki told George Bush and Tony Blair that there were no weapons of mass destruction in Iraq in February 2003.

== Awards and fellowships ==
In 1991 Matisonn and Ira Glass, host of This American Life, were jointly awarded by the National Association of Black Journalists for their four-part series comparing race relations in South Africa with those in the United States. Matisonn was a William F. Benton Fellow in Broadcast Journalism at the University of Chicago in 1992.
