= David Bullard =

South African columnist and author (born 1952)

- Born: 1952 (age 73–74); London
- Occupations: Columnist; Author
- Known for: Out to Lunch column

David Bullard (born 1952) is a British-born and South African naturalized columnist, author, TV presenter and celebrity public speaker known for his controversial satire and sharp wit.

== Early career ==
Bullard studied English and Drama at Exeter University, gave up on the idea of becoming a barrister and, instead, became a trader on the London Stock Exchange before emigrating to South Africa in 1981.

In South Africa he continued his career in financial services, before starting a column entitled "Out to Lunch" for the Business Times section of The Sunday Times newspaper in 1994. It was thought to be one of the most widely read columns published in the country (with a claimed readership at its peak of 1.7mln readers), at least in part because of Bullard's habit of insulting and infuriating the rich and famous. Bullard also co-presented the television show Car Torque for four and a half years on SABC3, and contributed regularly to motoring publications. He MC'd the Sunday Times Top 100 companies awards for ten years and MC'd a host of other corporate events prior to his downfall.

He currently writes the "Out to Lunch" column every week for politicsweb.co.za.

== Books ==
In 2002, the first collection of his columns, Out to Lunch, went straight to the number 1 best seller spot in December 2002. That was followed by a second collection, Out to Lunch Again, in 2005. The third, Screw it, Let's Do Lunch!, appeared in 2007 and remained on the best seller list for 4 months selling over 12000 copies A fourth book, Out to Lunch, Ungagged, was published in 2012 and contained a large collection of columns written after his firing from The Sunday Times. It is considered by many to be the best of his four books.

== Shooting ==
In March 2007 Bullard and his wife were attacked by two men in a home robbery and Bullard was wounded. Shortly after the incident he told a newspaper "apart from having a bullet in me, I'm absolutely fabulous", though he complained of the bloody mess in his home.

== Firing due to allegations of racism ==
On 10 April 2008, Bullard was fired as a Sunday Times columnist after the publication, the previous Sunday, of a column entitled "Uncolonised Africa wouldn't know what it was missing", that the newspaper subsequently described as racist and insulting to black people. On 13 April, Sunday Times editor Mondli Makhanya apologised for publishing the column, saying that "by publishing him (Bullard) we were complicit in disseminating his Stone Age philosophies". The same issue of the paper carried an entire page dedicated to letters regarding the column and firing, roughly equally divided between support for the paper and support for Bullard.

Bullard linked his firing with a column ("Run out of gas") published in Empire magazine in February 2008, in which he was highly critical of the Sunday Times and its editorial management. Makhanya denied any connection.

After a week of sustained media interest, Bullard apologised for the offending column, but said the next day he would sue for unfair dismissal. At least three complaints were laid against him with the South African Human Rights Commission.

Asked about Bullard in a press conference subsequently, arts and culture minister Pallo Jordan said his writing amounted to defecating on Africans and that "Bullard is the sort of person South Africa does not need within its borders."

In 2014, Bullard's case for unfair dismissal against Avusa entered its sixth year. In April 2019, Bullard wrote an article for The Daily Friend, in which he mentioned the fact that his litigation with the Sunday Times had entered its twelfth year.
