= Emgee Pretorius =

South African actor (1923-2007)

- Born: November 30, 1923; South Africa
- Died: May 1, 2007 (aged 83); Pretoria
- Occupation: Actor
- Years active: 1945-2004

Emgee Pretorius (November 30, 1923 – May 1, 2007) was an Afrikaans actor. He was a familiar face on South African television and played leading roles in TV series such as Nommer asseflieg (as De Jongh), Vyfster (as Priester) and Koöperasiestories (as Veldsman).

Pretorius began his professional career in 1945 in The Merry Wives of Windsor, after which he joined André Huguenet's company and toured South Africa until 1947. From 1948 until the end of 1952 he performed with the South African National Theatre, after which he left the entertainment world. He returned to acting in 1979 to play a major role in Afrikaans television series.

Pretorius died on 1 May 2007 at the age of 83 in Wilgers Hospital in Pretoria due to a heart attack.

== Filmography ==
- Dryfsand, a kykNET drama.
- Der weisse Afrikaner, 2004 (TV movie) as Lombaard
- Drum, 2004 as Johan Snyman
- Stander, 2003 as the marriage judge
- Grondbaronne, 1993 (TV series)
- Night of the nineteenth, 1992
- Dear Heaven, Genis!, 1986 as Field Marshal
- Vyfster: Die Slot, 1985 as Priest
- Skollie, 1984 as Priest
- Vyfster, 1984 (TV series) as Priest
- Koöperasiestories, 1983 (TV series) as Field Marshal
- Number please, 1979 (TV series) as De Jongh
- Die wildsboudjie, 1946
- Sterretjie
