= Sand du Plessis Theatre =

The Sand du Plessis Theatre (Afrikaans: Sand du Plessis-teaterkompleks) is located on Markgraaff Street, Bloemfontein, South Africa. It is a large, multipurpose theater center opened on August 1, 1985 as the home of the Regional Council of Sukovs (Orange Free State Performing Arts Society). It covers a whole city block and includes two formal spaces. The theatre is named after Sand du Plessis, former administrator of Free State. The primary architect of the project was Henk Boting.

The main theater seats 964 and has been adapted for large productions of drama, musicals, pop music concerts, opera, etc. It opened with Giuseppe Verdi's Nabucco and William Shakespeare's The Merchant of Venice.

== André Huguenet Theater ==
A second venue in the theater is named after the South African actor André Huguenet, born in Bloemfontein. It is a smaller, experimental theater seating 300 and can also be used as a television studio. It opened in 1985 with two productions in Afrikaans, Blood Wedding by Federico García Lorca on August 28 and Don Juan onder die Boere by Bartho Smit on September 4.

== Skateboarding ==
The theater building is also used as Bloemfontein's skatepark. Skateboarders come to practice their sport here each Saturday.
