= Dutoit =

Dutoit is a French surname. Notable people with the surname include:

== Artists ==
- Alice Dutoit, known as Alice on the Roof (born 1995), Belgian singer
- Charles Dutoit (born 1936), Swiss conductor
- Roger Dutoit (1923–1988), French actor

== Athletes ==
- Bernard Dutoit (1923–2000), Swiss basketball player
- William Dutoit (born 1988), French professional footballer

== Other ==
- Christian Dutoit (1940–), French journalist
- Frédéric Dutoit (born 1956), French politician from the French Communist Party
- Frederick E. DuToit (1845-1922), American Civil War veteran, Minnesota politician, and newspaper printer

== See also ==
- 1994 Solar Temple massacres
- Du Toit, South African surname
- Richard Dutoit Carlson (1912–1977) American actor
