= Ken Owen (journalist) =

South African journalist

Kenneth Owen (21 February 1935 – 19 March 2015) was a South African journalist and editor of The Sunday Times.

Owen was editor of The Sunday Times from 1990 to 1996, and transformed it "from a white-read, sensationalist rag to a well-respected newspaper with a majority black readership". In their obituary, the UK's The Independent called Owen "one of the giants of apartheid-era journalism".
