= Anna Neethling-Pohl =

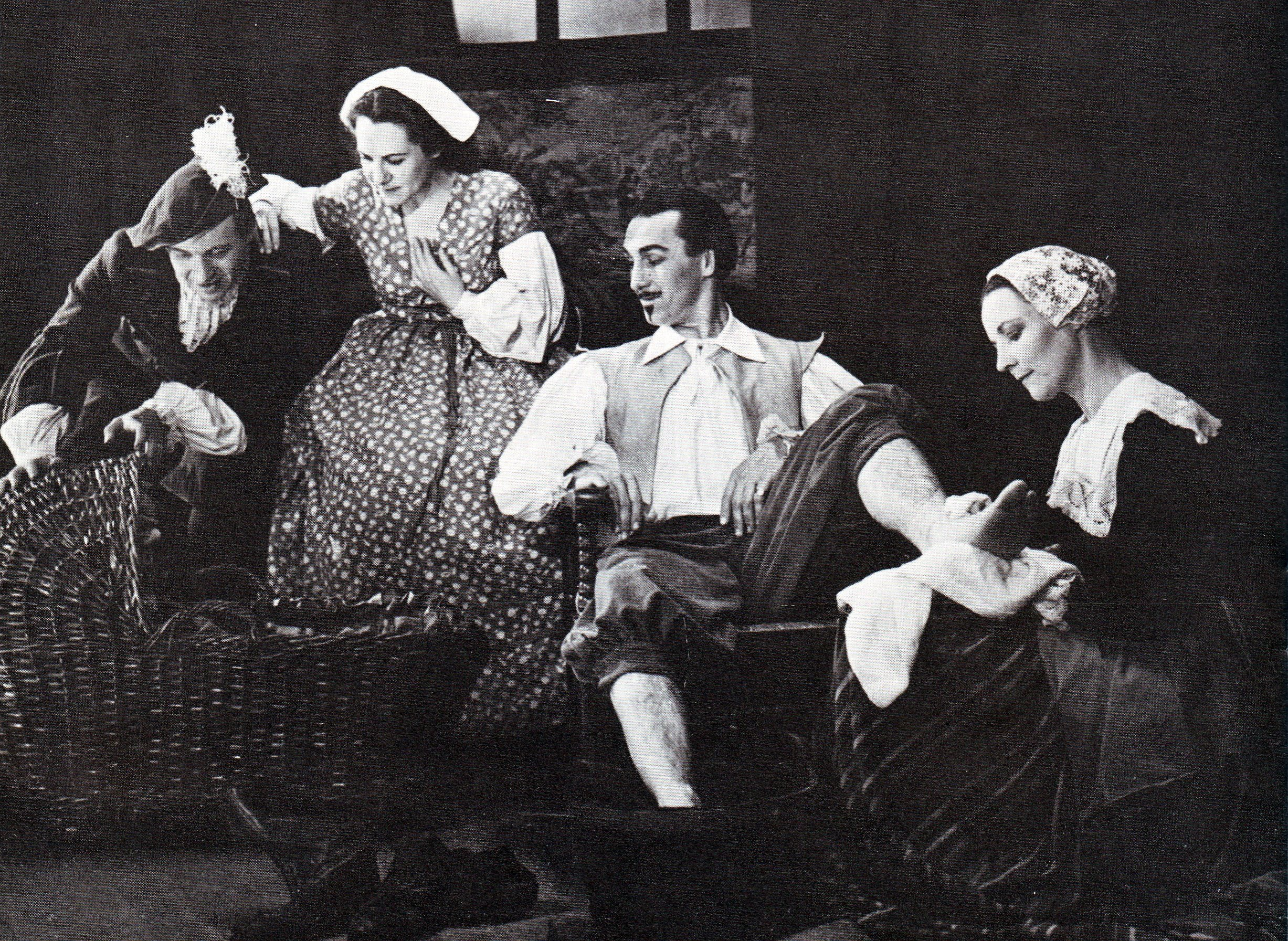
- Gert van den Bergh, Paula Styger, Pierre de Wet and Anna Neethling-Pohl in the play Die Goeie ou tyd (1944)
- Born: 24 December 1906; Graaff-Reinet, Cape Colony
- Died: 14 August 1992 (aged 85); Bloemfontein, South Africa
- Occupations: Actress; Performer; Film producer

Anna Neethling-Pohl (24 December 1906 – 14 August 1992) was a South African actress, performer and film producer. She was also an author who wrote under the pen name Niehausvor and sometimes Wynand du Preez. She was the first female broadcaster at the South African Broadcasting Corporation.

== Biography ==
Anna Servasina Pohl was born in Graaff-Reinet on 24 December 1906, as the eldest of four children. She got introduced to theatre at the early age of five and participated in high school performances at Langenhoven. She participated in over 50 dramas throughout her lifetime, most of which were in Afrikaans. Among her works are translations of 7 Shakespearean dramas into Afrikaans.

Her mother died during the Great Flu Epidemic of October 1918 and the baby she expected was born dead. Two years after her death, her father married Johanna le Roux and had two sons (Pieter le Roux and Friedrich Wilhelm) from this marriage. Her father died in 1964 after his ninetieth birthday.

Neethling-Pohl and her husband became members of the pro-Nazi Ossewabrandwag, which was strongly opposed to South Africa's involvement in World War II. She played a leading role in organising a march of nearly 10,000 women against the war. Neethling-Pohl's husband became a general in the organization, and was arrested for his involvement in the organisation in February 1942. He was later interned, and was released from custody in 1944. The couple divorced shortly after.

Neethling-Pohl received numerous awards for her contribution to Afrikaans drama. The South African Academy of the Science and Arts and The Federation of Afrikaans Cultural Associations were some of the prestigious institutions that honoured her.
