= Pierre de Wet =

South African actor

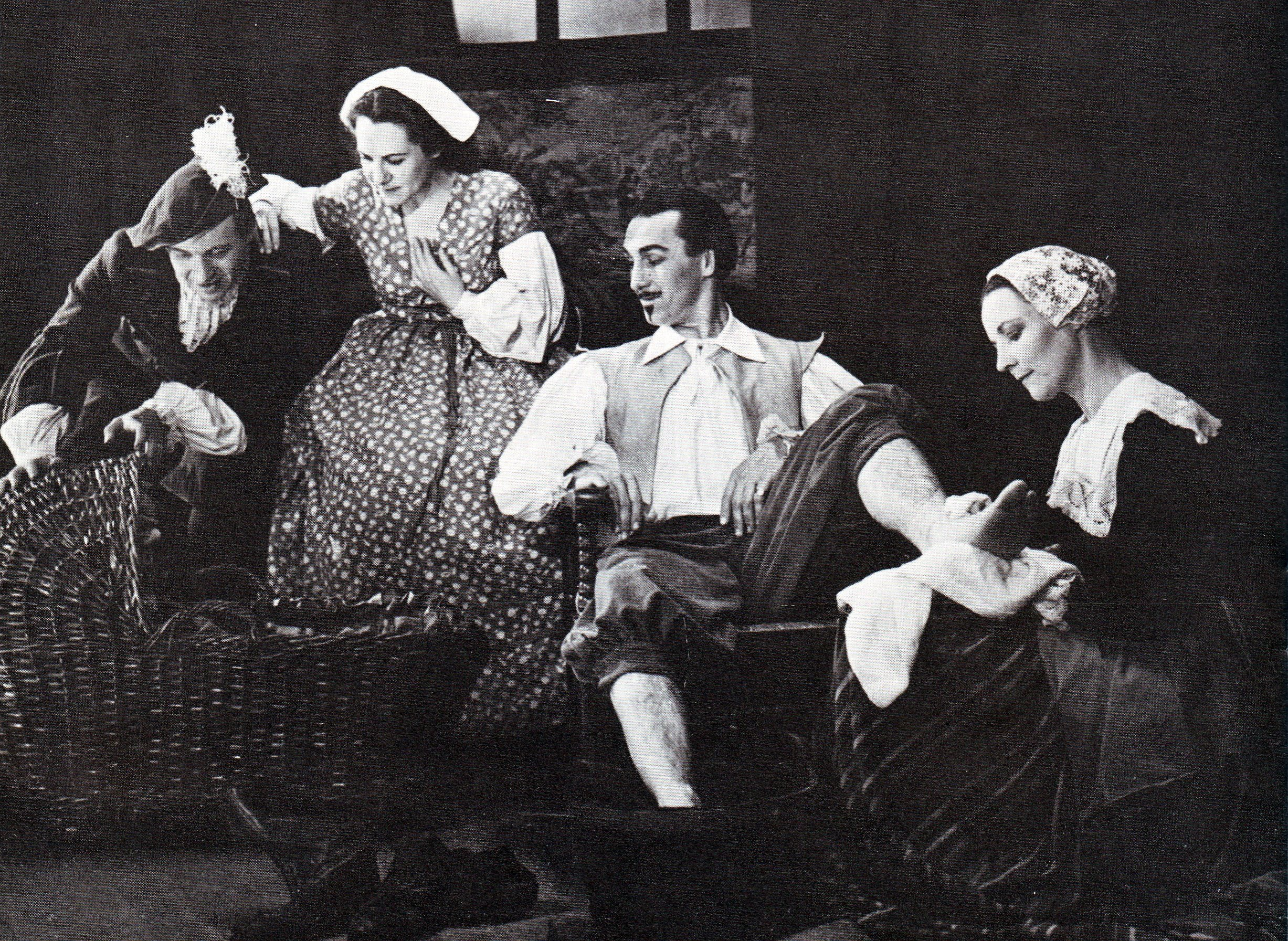
- Gert van den Bergh, Paula Styger, Pierre de Wet and Anna Neethling-Pohl in a scene from Sita's Die Goeie ou tyd (1944).
- Born: Pierre Stephanus de Wet; 22 August 1909; Pretoria
- Died: 24 June 1990 (aged 80); Johannesburg
- Occupations: Director, actor, producer, screenwriter

Pierre Stephanus de Wet (1909–1990) was a film director, producer and writer. He is considered the father of the Afrikaans film industry. He established the Afrikaans film industry almost single-handedly with meager means and produced a total of 21 Afrikaans films during his lifetime. De Wet was also the creator of Kom Saam Vanaand (1949), the first ever South African and Afrikaans musical.

He died of a heart attack in a Johannesburg hospital in 1990 at the age of 80.

== Filmography ==
=== As an actor ===
- Pikkie se Erfenis, 1946
- Die kaskenades van Dr. Kwak, 1948 as Dr. Hendrikus Kwak
- Moedertjie, 1931 (first full-length film with Afrikaans dialogue)

=== As an author ===
- Dis Lekker om te Lewe, 1957
- ’n Plan is ’n Boerdery, 1954
- Hier’s ons weer, 1950
- Die kaskenades van Dr. Kwak, 1948
- Simon Beyers, 1947

=== As an director ===
- En die Vonke Spat, 1961
- Oupa en die plaasnooientjie, 1960
- Nooi van my hart, 1959
- Piet se tante, 1959
- Fratse in die vloot, 1958
- Dis Lekker om te Lewe, 1957
- Matieland, 1955
- Vadertjie Langbeen, 1955
- ’n Plan is ’n Boerdery, 1954
- Altyd in my drome, 1952
- Alles sal regkom, 1951
- Kom saam, vanaand, 1949 (eerste Suid-Afrikaanse en Afrikaanse musiekblyspel)
- Die kaskenades van Dr. Kwak, 1948
- Simon Beyers, 1947
- Geboortegrond, 1946
- Pikkie se Erfenis, 1946

== Awards ==
- For his performance in Moedertjie he received the first Afrikaans film award - a medal of honour from the then Academy for Language, Letters and Arts.
