= Felicia Mabuza-Suttle =

South African talk show hostess

- Born: 3 June 1950 (age 76); Sophiatown, South Africa
- Education: St Michael's Girls School, Manzini; BA Journalism and MA Mass Communication, Marquette University
- Occupations: Television talk show hostess, entrepreneur
- Known for: The Felicia Show, various business ventures
- Spouse: Earl Suttle
- Children: Lindiwe, Zanele
- Website: www.feliciainc.com

Felicia Mabuza-Suttle (born 3 June 1950) is a South African talk show hostess and entrepreneur. In the TV show Great South Africans, she was voted as the 70th greatest South African of all time in an informal public poll.

== Early life ==
Mabuza-Suttle was born in Sophiatown, a black neighbourhood in Johannesburg, South Africa, during the apartheid era. Her grandfather, Ben Mabuza, raised her and was a major inspiration for her later success. Meanwhile, her father, who owned one of the first driving schools in the nation, provided a steady income for the family. During her childhood she became interested in dance, which became a lifelong pursuit.

== Education ==
In the 1960s and 70s, a large number of black South Africans went overseas to study to evade the apartheid regime. Mabuza-Suttle was amongst them, studying at Marquette University in the United States. In the 80s, she became the first member of her family to achieve a college degree when she earned a BA in journalism, followed by an MA in Mass Communication.

As well as studying, Mabuza-Suttle also wrote for the World Newspaper, where she met prominent anti-apartheid activists, including Steve Biko, the leader of the Black Consciousness Movement. This would lead to her becoming politically involved when she returned to South Africa.

== Career in South Africa ==
Mabuza-Suttle returned for a short time to South Africa in 1982 to work for Radio Bophutatswana, where she was criticised for being politically incorrect.

In 1990, Mabuza-Suttle returned permanently to South Africa, accepting a position at the South African Airways. In 1992, she began her television career after being offered a job as a talk show host at the South African Broadcasting Corporation. Talk shows were a fairly new concept in South Africa at the time, and her show rapidly became successful. Originally known as Top Level, its name was changed to The Felicia Show in 1995, and it was again renamed simply Felicia in 2000 (accompanying a move to ETV, the largest South African English-language channel). The show focused mainly on social topics, but also ventured into entertainment.

However, amidst criticisms that her show was too similar to The Oprah Winfrey Show, Felicia closed down in 2004. Mabuza-Suttle moved her show to the United States, where it was broadcast as Conversations with Felicia on The Africa Channel. It still focused mainly on South African personalities.

== Entrepreneurship ==
Propelled by her success on television, Mabuza-Suttle founded several business ventures, including the Felicia brand of clothing and accessories, Pamodzi Investments, FMS Productions, and Back of the Moon, a restaurant. She has been involved in philanthropic activities, including donating a portion of her eyewear profits to an anti-drug and anti-crime campaign.

However, in 2012, she liquidated Back of the Moon for various reasons, including economic and legal difficulties, and disagreements with her business partner and landlord.

== Personal life ==
Mabuza-Suttle married Earl Suttle in 1976. She lives in Johannesburg, while Earl Suttle lives in Atlanta, Georgia. They have two children, Lindiwe and Zanele.
