= Great South Africans =

South African television series

Great South Africans is a South African television series that aired on SABC3. It was hosted by Noeleen Maholwana-Sangqu and Denis Beckett. In September 2004, thousands of South Africans took part in an informal nationwide poll under the series to determine the "100 Greatest South Africans" of all time. Votes were cast by telephone, SMS, and the website of the state-run South African Broadcasting Corporation television channel, SABC3, which aired a series of profiles and documentaries in the weeks leading up to the announcement of the top 100. The programme was modelled on the BBC's Greatest Britons series.

In South Africa, the list was headed by Nelson Mandela, a symbol of post-apartheid liberation and reconciliation. Other popular choices ranged from Professor Christiaan Barnard, a heart surgeon, to General Jan Smuts, wartime Prime Minister and co-founder of the League of Nations, to Shaka Zulu, the a 19th century warrior leader of the Zulu Kingdom, to Internet entrepreneur and civilian space traveller Mark Shuttleworth.

Two days after the list was announced, Nelson Mandela had already received several thousands of votes more than any other candidate.

== Controversy ==
At the time when the competition was announced, in June 2004, the SABC gave the assurance that the South African show would not ban certain political figures, as was the case in the German version which banned Nazis from the list. They soon came to regret their decision when the SABC became embroiled in a national controversy over the high rankings accorded to some South Africans who were less widely regarded as "great".

For example, Hendrik Verwoerd, the "Architect of Apartheid", ranked higher on the list than Albert Luthuli, South Africa's first Nobel Peace laureate, or Chris Hani, a famous anti-apartheid activist. Also present on the list was Eugène Terre'Blanche, the head of the Afrikaner Weerstandsbeweging.

Other controversial choices included an 11th placing for Hansie Cronje, the now-disgraced former captain of the South African cricket team, who admitted to taking bribes to influence the outcome of test matches.

On 14 October, the SABC announced that the show was being cancelled, leaving positions 2 to 10 still formally undecided.

Letter columns in some newspapers called the show a farce and used the term "whites with cellphones" to explain the presence of Hendrik Verwoerd and Eugène Terre'Blanche high on the rankings. This view was rebutted by Afrikaans singer-songwriter Steve Hofmeyr who pointed out that Winnie Madikizela-Mandela, an anti-apartheid activist who was convicted of fraud post-apartheid, scored high on the list as well. According to Peter Matlare, CEO of the SABC, the show was stopped because "wider participation in the voting process" was necessary.

When the competition was announced, the SABC defined a Great South African as someone who contributed to the "country's life and development". When the show was stopped, the SABC claimed that their definition of a Great South African was actually someone who contributed to South Africa's development "and the promotion of humanity" and the fact that quite a few people on the list did not fit this description contributed to the decision to stop the show.

== The list ==
This is the original list of "100 Greatest South Africans", with positions 2 to 10 still to be confirmed by public vote, before the show was taken off the air:

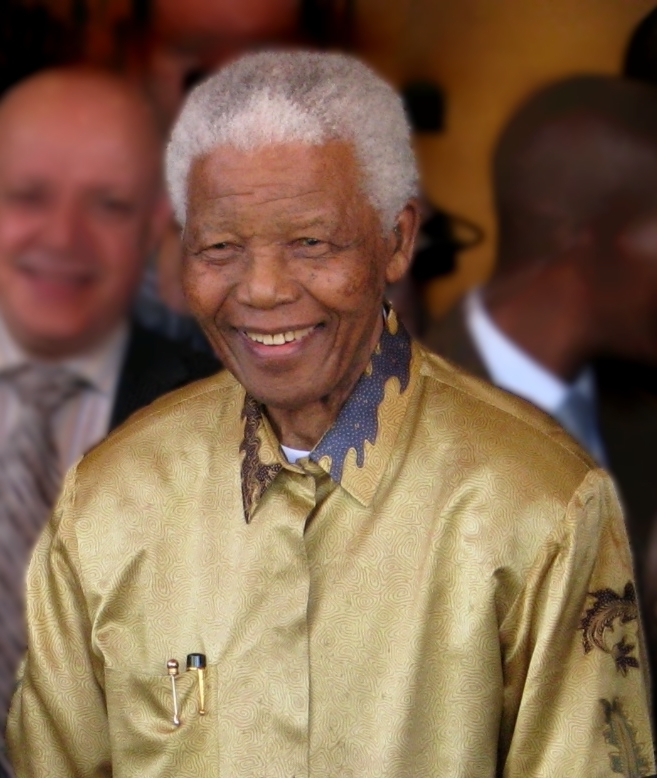
Nelson Mandela

No.	Name	D.O.B. – D.O.D.	Role
1.	Nelson Mandela	(1918–2013)	first president of post-Apartheid South Africa and joint Nobel Peace Prize winner
2.	Christiaan Barnard	(1922–2001)	pioneering heart transplant surgeon
3.	Mahatma Gandhi	(1869–1948)	political activist
4.	Nkosi Johnson	(1989–2001)	child HIV/AIDS activist who died of the disease
5.	Winnie Madikizela-Mandela	(1936–2018)	politician and second wife of Nelson Mandela
6.	Thabo Mbeki	(1942–)	second president of post-Apartheid South Africa
7.	Gary Player	(1935–)	golfer
8.	Jan Smuts	(1870–1950)	statesman and philosopher
9.	Desmond Tutu	(1931–2021)	cleric and Nobel Peace Prize winner
10.	Hansie Cronje	(1969–2002)	cricketer
11.	Charlize Theron	(1975–)	actress and Academy Award winner
14.	Steve Biko	(1946–1977)	political activist
15.	Shaka Zulu	(1787–1828)	founder of the Zulu nation
16.	Mangosuthu Buthelezi	(1928–2023)	politician and a Zulu prince
17.	Tony Leon	(1956–)	politician
18.	Brenda Fassie	(1964–2004)	singer
19.	Mark Shuttleworth	(1973–)	Web entrepreneur, founder of Thawte, distributor of Ubuntu Linux and second fee paying space tourist
20.	Hendrik Verwoerd	(1901–1966)	former prime minister and primary architect of Apartheid
21.	Chris Hani	(1942–1993)	political activist who was Secretary General of the SACP when he was assassinated
22.	Bonginkosi Dlamini	(1977–)	also known as "Zola", poet, actor and musician
22.	Patricia de Lille	(1951–)	politician
23.	Johnny Clegg	(1953–2019)	also known as "The White Zulu", musician
24.	Helen Suzman	(1917–2009)	stateswoman
25.	Eugène Terre'Blanche	(1941–2010)	founder of the Afrikaner Weerstandsbeweging
26.	Pieter-Dirk Uys	(1945–)	political satirist and entertainer
27.	Paul Kruger	(1825–1904)	four times president of South African Republic
28.	Anton Rupert	(1916–2006)	businessman and environmentalist
29.	Jonty Rhodes	(1969–)	cricketer
30.	Leon Schuster	(1951–)	filmmaker, comedian, actor and prankster (entertainer)
31.	Oliver Tambo	(1917–1993)	political activist who spent 30 years in exile
32.	Steve Hofmeyr	(1964–)	musician and actor
33.	Walter Sisulu	(1912–2003)	political activist
34.	Cyril Ramaphosa	(1952–)	politician, businessman, and anti-apartheid activist; later served as president of South Africa
35.	J. R. R. Tolkien	(1892–1973)	English author, wrote The Hobbit and The Lord of the Rings; born in Bloemfontein
36.	Beyers Naude	(1915–2004)	cleric and anti-apartheid activist
37.	Ernie Els	(1969–)	golfer
38.	Miriam Makeba	(1932–2008)	musician
39.	Patrice Motsepe	(1962–)	businessman
40.	Trevor Manuel	(1956–)	draftsman, minister of finance and politician
41.	Albert Luthuli	(1898–1967)	cleric, politician and 1960 Nobel Peace Prize winner
42.	Robert Sobukwe	(1924–1978)	former political activist and founder of the PAC
43.	Tokyo Sexwale	(1953–)	politician and businessman
44.	Danny Jordaan	(1951–)	politician and soccer administrator
45.	Fatima Meer	(1928–2010)	scientist and political activist
46.	Ahmed Kathrada	(1929–2017)	political activist
47.	Joe Slovo	(1926–1995)	communist politician
48.	Natalie du Toit	(1984–)	disabled Olympic swimmer
49.	Jomo Sono	(1955–)	soccer coach
50.	Francois Pienaar	(1967–)	captain of the Springboks, the winning team in the 1995 Rugby World Cup
51.	John Kani	(1943–)	actor, entertainer, writer, and Tony Award Winner
52.	Penny Heyns	(1974–)	Olympic swimmer
53.	Jeremy Mansfield	(1963–2022)	radio and TV personality
54.	Lucas Radebe	(1969–)	former Bafana Bafana and Leeds United soccer captain
55.	Mamphela Ramphele	(1947–)	political activist, academic, businesswoman and mother to the son of Steve Biko
56.	Cecil Rhodes	(1853–1902)	businessman and Prime Minister of the Cape Colony
57.	Albertina Sisulu	(1918–2011)	political activist and wife of Walter Sisulu
58.	Aggrey Klaaste	(1940–2004)	journalist and editor who advocated Nation Building during the struggle years
59.	Alan Paton	(1903–1988)	author
60.	Harry Oppenheimer	(1908–2000)	businessman
61.	Zackie Achmat	(1962–)	HIV positive AIDS activist and critic of government AIDS policies
62.	Doctor Khumalo	(1967–)	soccer player
63.	Jan van Riebeeck	(1619–1677)	first colonial administrator
64.	Bruce Fordyce	(1955–)	ultra-marathon runner
65.	Enoch Sontonga	(1873–1905)	teacher, lay-preacher and composer; wrote "Nkosi Sikelel' iAfrika"
66.	Zola Budd	(1966–)	athlete
67.	Sol Plaatje	(1877–1932)	journalist and political activist
68.	Danie Craven	(1910–1994)	rugby player and administrator
69.	Alan Boesak	(1946–)	cleric and politician
70.	Felicia Mabuza-Suttle	(1950–)	talk show host, public speaker and businesswoman
71.	Yvonne Chaka Chaka	(1965–)	musician
72.	"Baby" Jake Matlala	(1962–2013)	boxer and junior flyweight champion
73.	Kaizer Motaung	(1944–)	founder of Kaizer Chiefs Football Club
74.	Basetsana Kumalo	(1974–)	former Miss South Africa, presenter and businesswoman
75.	Antjie Krog	(1952–)	poet, novelist and playwright
76.	Dullah Omar	(1934–2004)	politician
77.	Mandoza	(1978–2016)	musician
78.	Nkosazana Dlamini-Zuma	(1949–)	Politician and activist. Jacob Zuma's ex-wife
79.	Raymond Ackerman	(1931–2023)	businessman
80.	Nadine Gordimer	(1923–2014)	1991 Nobel Prize-winning author
81.	Daniel François Malan	(1874–1959)	former Prime Minister responsible for laying the groundwork for Apartheid
82.	Frederik van Zyl Slabbert	(1940–2010)	politician
83.	James Barry Munnik Hertzog	(1866–1942)	former Prime Minister
84.	Hector Pieterson	(1963–1976)	young boy whose death has become the symbol of the Soweto uprising of June 1976
85.	Sewsunker "Papwa" Sewgolum	(1930–1978)	golfer
86.	William Smith	(1939–2021)	TV teacher and presenter
87.	P. W. Botha	(1916–2006)	former prime minister and state president
88.	Hugh Masekela	(1939–2018)	musician
89.	Bulelani Ngcuka	(1954–)	politician
90.	Jody Scheckter	(1950–)	Formula One world champion
91.	George Bizos	(1928–2020)	lawyer
92.	Mbongeni Ngema	(1954–2023)	playwright, actor, choreographer and director
93.	PJ Powers	(1960–)	musician
94.	Mimi Coertse	(1932–2026)	musician
95.	Mrs Ples	(2 million BC)	Australopithecus africanus; the oldest hominid skull found at Sterkfontein cave
96	Abdullah Ibrahim aka "Dollar Brand"	(1934–2026)	musician
96.	Govan Mbeki	(1910–2001)	political activist and father of Thabo Mbeki
97.	Jamie Uys	(1921–1996)	film director
98.	JH Pierneef	(1886–1957)	artist
99.	Tebogo Modjadji-Kekana	(1977–)	globally recognised philanthropist and a Royal Princess
100.	Athol Fugard	(1932–2025)	playwright

== Other editions ==
Other countries have produced similar shows; see Greatest Britons spin-offs

== See also ==
- List of South Africans
- They Shaped Our Century, a survey by Media24 in 1999 about 100 most influential South Africans (and people associated with South Africa) of the twentieth century
