= Donald du Toit =

Donald du Toit FCS, FRCS
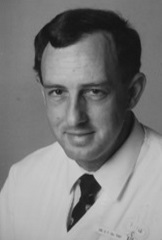
- Born: November 1, 1946 (age 79); Cape Town, South Africa

Academic background
- Education: University of Stellenbosch 2007. University of Oxford 1980

Donald du Toit (born November 1, 1946) is a South African specialist general surgeon, clinician and emeritus professor as well as chief of Anatomy and Histology and previous ad hominem professor of surgery at the University of Stellenbosch.

== Career ==
In 1982 he held the post of principal academic surgeon at Tygerberg Hospital (Parow, South Africa). He was also engaged in doctoral, preclinical and laboratory research at the Nuffield Department of Surgery, John Radcliffe Hospital under the headmanship of Sir Professor Peter Morris and focused on pancreas transplantation for diabetes mellitus as well as the development of chemical immune suppressants such as cyclosporine. He has held faculty based, academic teaching and research professorship appointments in Surgery (ad hominem) as well as Anatomy and Histology at the University of Stellenbosch and focused on medical, para medical and post graduate surgeon education by application of applied digital imaging, theoretical and cadaveric teaching.

He was chairman of the Department of Anatomy and Histology at the University of Stellenbosch (1995-2007) and specialised in human neuro anatomy as well as extremity anatomy education as an anatomist. He succeeded professor Ardon Malan at Stellenbosch as departmental head of Anatomy and Histology. His academic research focus has included abdominal aortic aneurysms, organ transplantation, diabetes mellitus, cell biology of fibroblasts, myoblasts, platelet rich plasma, biotechnology and monoclonal antibodies. He also rendered clinical services at Karl Bremer, Tygerberg, Frere, Addington, Panorama Medi Clinic and John Radcliff Hospitals.

His research activities included anti-aging regenerative medicine, has been part of the academic faculty of IMCAS Paris (France 2008) and directed live demonstrations in the use of platelet rich plasma, also referred to as PRP. He has been a member of the Surgical Research Society of South Africa, College of Medicine and the “Akademie van Wetenskap en Kuns: Tak Simon Van der Stel".

== Publications ==
He has authored and also co-authored several non-fiction, academic undergraduate as well as post graduate medical books and scientific textbooks both in English and Afrikaans, including a comprehensive medical encyclopaedia in Afrikaans entitled Dokter In Die Huis. He co-authored a road racing bicycle guide on how to ride the Argus Cycle Tour which is held yearly in Cape Town, South Africa. He was also a non-fiction book author for Tafelberg Publishers in Cape Town during 2012.
