= Langenhoven =

Langenhoven is an Afrikaans surname. Notable people with the surname include:

- Bradley Langenhoven (born 1983), South African rugby union player
- Cornelis Jacobus Langenhoven (1873–1932), South African poet
- Hilton Langenhoven (born 1983), South African athlete
- Francois Hendrik Langenhoven (born 1991), South African rugby union player
