= Anna Cloete =

South African actress

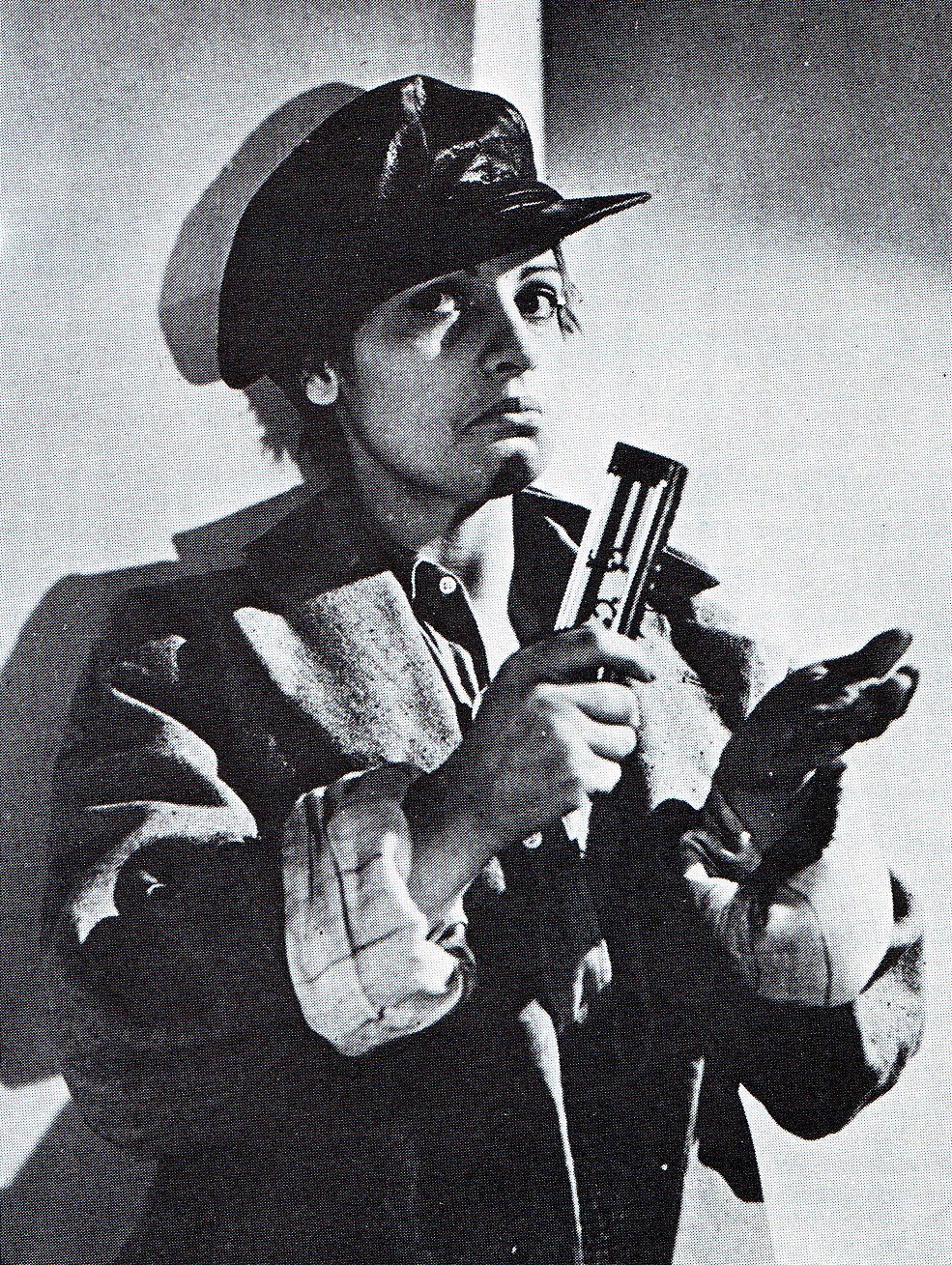
- Born: 18 July 1913
- Died: 10 February 1999 (aged 85); Strand, Western Cape
- Occupation: Actress

Anna Cloete (1913–1999) was a pioneering South African actress. She was part of the Afrikaans theatre, film and television industry for six decades.

Cloete performed with her husband as part of the James Norval touring company for many years from the 1930s. She also wrote plays herself, such as Ou liefde roes nie and Elke hart het sy smart. She later, until her retirement, played for the then Truk and was known nationwide for her warm personality and embodied character roles.

After the introduction of television in 1976, she starred in one of the first Afrikaans TV dramas, Die ryk weduwee, and then in Die koster.

She died of a stroke on 10 February 1999 at the age of 86. Her only child, Paddy Norval, had already died in the 1980s.

== Filmography ==
As an actress:

- Elsa se Geheim, 1979
- Night of the Puppets, 1979 as Molina da Costa
- Die Spaanse Vlieg, 1978
- Met Liefde van Adèle, 1974
- Die Kandidaat, 1968 as Sonja
- Geheim van Onderplaas, 1962
- The Hellions, 1961 as mev. Archer (not credited)
- Spore in die Modder, 1961
- Paul Krüger, 1956 as Alida Malan
- Sarie Marais, 1949 as Aletta

As an author:

- Geheim van Onderplaas, 1962
