= Dutoitea =

Dutoitea Temporal range: Early Devonian to Middle Devonian

Scientific classification
- Kingdom: Plantae
- Clade: Polysporangiophytes
- Clade: Tracheophytes
- Stem group: †Rhyniophyta
- Genus: †Dutoitea; Hoeg, 1930

Extinct genus of Devonian organisms

Dutoitia is a genus of Devonian rhyniophyte, named after the renowned South African geologist Alex du Toit. It is one of the earliest plants from Gondwana to colonize land. Its fossils were preserved in fine mudstones of the 400-million-year-old Bokkeveld and Witteberg Groups of South Africa. This erect, gracile plant is less than 10 cm high and very simple in structure. Its diminutive stems (0.1–3.0 mm in diameter), which are devoid of leaflike appendages, branch in two and end in club- or cup-shaped sporangia, occasionally containing its reproductive spores. Stomata (tiny pores) are present in the cuticle of their stems for gas exchange, and primitive cells inside the stems transported water from the roots to the aerial parts of the plant. Three species are recognized, D. pulchra Hoeg 1930 (from the Bloukrans River in the Knysna district, Ceres Subgroup, Lower Bokkeveld Group), D. alfreda Plumstead 1967 (Port Alfred, Weltevrede Subgroup, Lower Witteberg Group) and D. maraisia Plumstead 1967 (Howisons Poort, Witpoort Sandstone, Middle Witteberg Group).
