= Taubie Kushlick =

South African actress and producer (1910–1991)

- Born: Taubie Braun; 7 May 1910; Luckhoff, Orange Free State, South Africa
- Died: 13 March 1991 (aged 80); Johannesburg, South Africa
- Occupation: Actress/Producer
- Spouse: Philip Kushlick

Taubie Kushlick (1910–1991) was a South African actress and producer. She became characterized as the self-styled "First Lady of Theatre".

== Personal life and education ==
Kushlick, one of six children, was the daughter of Jewish Lithuanian immigrants from Kovno. She was born in Luckhoff, Orange Free State, grew up in Port Elizabeth and was educated at Wesleyan High School (now Kingswood College), Grahamstown. She studied for two years at the Royal Academy of Music in London, earning two gold medals. She married paediatrician Dr Philip Kushlick. They had one child, a son who was a surgeon. Kushlick lived in Johannesburg for most of her life. In an interview with the Sunday Times columnist, Jani Allan she described herself as "a BIG personality..A Rolls-Royce! A man-eating Rolls-Royce!"

== Career ==
Kushlick's career as an actress and theatre producer spanned over six decades. She received acclaim for her notable role in South African theatre. Her hand-on approach also became a particular characteristic of her career, she once admitted "My type is dying out of the theatre. I'm a conductor who has to ORCHESTRATE the whole thing."

Her career highlights included producing for Reps (Alexander Theatre), the National Theatre (PACT), the Children's Theatre, universities and CAPAB. She was frequently nominated for South Africa's Woman of the Year prize for her theatre productions. She enjoyed particular success with productions such as Fiddler on the roof, Lion in Winter, Bravo Piaf, The Student Prince and A Little Night Music, directing and starring alongside Eric Flynn. She was a fervent admirer of Jacques Brel and produced several musicals featuring his songs. By 1982, the longest run of any stage production in Johannesburg was Kushlick's Jacques Brel is Alive and Well and Living in Paris. Earlier in 1973 she held a special Jacques Brel performance to raise funds for Israel during the Yom Kippur War.

She was an honorary life member of the South African Association of Theatre Managements and patron of the Theatre Gallery Club. She also became the founder and director Taubie Kushlick Productions (Pty) Ltd. Awards bestowed upon her included the André Huguenet Memorial Medal for pioneering work in theatre, the B'nai B'rith Cultural Trophy, the Italian Cultural Medal and the Adelaide Ristori. She was also nominated as Woman of the Year on several occasions.

== Legacy ==
In 1999, she was placed at no.88 in the They shaped our century survey, a top 100 list published about which people had the greatest influence on South Africa during the twentieth century.

In 2024, at the South African Jewish Board of Deputies' 120th anniversary gala dinner, she was honoured among 100 remarkable Jewish South Africans who have contributed to South Africa. The ceremony included speeches from Chief Rabbi Ephraim Mirvis, and Kushlick was honoured with the likes of Nadine Gordimer and Helen Suzman.
