= Sunday Times (South Africa) =

South African weekly newspaper

- Type: Weekly newspaper
- Format: Broadsheet
- Owner: Arena Holdings
- Editor: Makhudu Sefara
- Founded: 1906
- Language: English
- Headquarters: Johannesburg, South Africa
- Circulation: 442,018 weekly
- Readership: 3,436,000
- Sister newspapers: Times Select; Financial Mail; Business Day; The Sowetan
- Website: sundaytimes.co.za

The Sunday Times is South Africa's biggest Sunday newspaper. Established in 1906, it is distributed throughout South Africa and in neighbouring countries such as Lesotho, Botswana and Eswatini

== History ==
The Sunday Times was first published on 4 February 1906 as a weekly sister publication of the Rand Daily Mail which at the time was "standing alone" against its rival, the Transvaal Leader.

Founding editor George Herbert Kingswell introduced the slogan "A Paper for the People". It was later changed to "The Paper for the People", a slogan that is still in use today. For the first edition of the paper, published on 4 February 1906, 11,600 copies were printed and soon sold out, forcing the paper to print an additional 5000 copies. By November 1909, the paper sales had risen to 35,000.

In 1992, the former columnist Jani Allan sued the British broadcaster Channel 4 for libel over affair allegations involving her and Eugene Terre'Blanche. Allan had interviewed the AWB leader for the Sunday Times. Allan had already settled out of court with the London Evening Standard and Options magazine over similar allegations. The then-news editor of the newspaper, the late Marlene Burger and newspaper astrologer Linda Shaw testified against Allan. Before the libel suit, Allan had published articles for the newspaper dismissing the affair allegations. Allan also allowed the newspaper to publish answerphone messages left by Terre'Blanche as well as her threats of taking legal action against Terre'Blanche for nuisance contact. Allan lost the case; the judge ruled that she had not been defamed but did not conclude whether an affair had occurred. The case became notorious for violence and a dirty tricks campaign. Publications such as the Financial Mail and Allan herself speculated that the De Klerk government paid the defence witnesses in an attempt to destabilise the far-right in South Africa. Shaw recounted her editor, Ken Owen's reaction to the case: "When I came back from London. Owen stood in the middle of the newsroom and said: 'You have single-handedly destroyed the reputation of every journalist in the country and we have become the laughing stock."

On 13 November 2005, the Sunday Times broke the story that the African National Congress (ANC) leader Jacob Zuma was being investigated on rape charges. It was reported that Zuma considered legal action against the publication, although it later emerged that an investigation was underway. On 6 December 2005, official rape charges were filed against Zuma. He would later be acquitted of rape.

On 5 November 2007, it was reported that a consortium containing some senior government figures had launched a bid to purchase 100% of Avusa (previously Johncom), the company that owned the Sunday Times.

In March 2007, Zuma sued the paper for R6 million over two columns by popular columnist David Bullard. The two columns, Stupidity a mitigating circumstance for Zuma, published on 16 April 2006, and Visit the Zuma website to see what was meant (7 May 2006), were cited by Zuma as defamatory and an "impairment of his dignity". Although David Bullard was found to be operating within the ethical bounds of The Sunday Times regarding the two columns, he would later fall out of favour with editor Mondli Makhanya.

On 10 April 2008, Bullard was fired from the Sunday Times after the publication of a column on 6 April 2008 titled, Uncolonised Africa wouldn't know what it was missing, received a stern protest from several political parties. The editor apologised for the column, saying "by publishing him (Bullard) we were complicit in disseminating his Stone Age philosophies".

In September 2008, the Sunday Times was again vigorously attacked for publishing a highly controversial piece, this time in the form of a cartoon by critically acclaimed cartoonist Jonathon Shapiro (Zapiro). The cartoon depicted Jacob Zuma getting ready to rape the Justice System while being assisted by the leaders of various ANC and political factions and parties. Zapiro denied any ambiguity between Jacob Zuma's depiction as a rapist in the cartoon and his earlier rape trial. the Sunday Times and its editor were slated by various ANC officials. A joint press release by the ANC, the South African Communist Party and the ANC Youth League lambasted the Sunday Times editor, describing him as a dictator, and called for his replacement: "We can only hope that the newspaper will find a suitable leadership other than the ranting dictator who finds joy in manipulating the truth."

In 2015, veteran journalist John Matisonn alleged in his book, "God, Spies and Lies: Finding South Africa's Future Through its Past", that the former editor of the newspaper, Tertius Myburgh, was an apartheid-era spy. In the same year, Jani Allan supported the allegations made against her former editor in an opinion piece published by the Daily Maverick.

== Editors ==
1906–1909: Founding editor George Herbert Kingswell launched the Sunday Times and Rand Daily Mail for owner Sir Abe Bailey. Kingswell was initially offered the job at The Rand Daily Mail (The Fourth Estate, Joel Mervis), but instead looked to create a weekly paper.

1909–1910: Lewis Rose Macleod named editor.

1910–1942': Joseph Langley Levy, a drama critic and leading cultural figure in Johannesburg, was born in Liverpool, England, on 25 May 1887. He was editor of the Sunday Times for 32 years, during which time circulation rose from 35,000 to 150,000, penetrating every province and reaching towns and villages scattered over an area of almost half a million square miles. He died in Johannesburg on 11 May 1945.

1942–1947': E.B 'Chook' Dawson is remembered as the first of the paper's 'shirtsleeves editors', a journalist who hated ostentation in either people or prose. At the time of his death in 1957, he was also remembered as a hero of Delville Wood who saved a comrade's life during the epic battle in World War I.

1947–1958: N. A. G. Caley named editor

1959–1975: Joel Mervis, as editor of the Sunday Times, is credited with transforming it into the most widely read and powerful weekly in South Africa.

1975–1990: Albert Tertius Myburgh (26 December 1936 – 2 December 1990) was a South African journalist and editor, best known as editor of the Sunday Times. Myburgh resigned as editor of the Sunday Times in September 1990 after 15 years. His next role was to be an ambassador to Washington or London. Four days later, he was diagnosed with terminal cancer and died at home in December of the same year.

1991–1996: Ken Owen named editor.

1996–1998: Brian Pottinger was also the deputy chair of the South African National Editor's Forum during this time. He became the managing director of Times Newspapers Limited and, in 2000, would be appointed as publisher of the Sunday Times. From 2003 to 2007, he was the chief executive officer of the Africa Division for Johnnic Communications Limited.

1998–2000: Mike Robertson was the editor and associate publisher for the Sunday Times during this period. He was the deputy editor, chief assistant editor, assistant editor, and political correspondent for the newspaper. He is the publisher of the Sunday Times and managing director of Times Media Group's media operations.

2002–2003: Mathatha Tsedu was the deputy editor of the Sunday Independent, the deputy editor of the Star, then the Deputy Chief executive of the SABC news before becoming editor of the Sunday Times in 2002. In 2003, he was dismissed as editor of the Sunday Times. In 2014, the SA National Editors' Forum announced that Mathatha Tsedu would serve as its executive director.

2004–2010: Mondli Makhanya was appointed as editor of Sunday Times. A political writer and editor, he became the Mail & Guardian editor in 2002 before joining the Sunday Times in 2004. In 2010, Makhanya was promoted to editor-in-chief of Avusa Media newspapers (including The Times and Sowetan, Sunday World).

2010–2013: Ray Hartley was the founding editor of the daily newspaper The Times in 2007 before taking over the reins as Editor of the Sunday Times in 2010 after Makhanya left. During Hartley's tenure as editor, Sunday Times journalists won virtually all the awards on offer, including the prestigious Standard Bank Sivukile and Taco Kuiper awards for investigative journalism. He is currently an editor at large for the Times Media Group and launched the Rand Daily Mail website in 2014.

2013–2015: Phylicia Oppelt became the first female editor of the Sunday Times. Oppelt was the editor of the Daily Dispatch from 2005 to 2008 and the editor of Business Times from 2008 to 2010. In 2010, she was appointed editor of The Times, which had entered the market in June 2007 under Hartley's editorship.

2016–2020: Bongani Siqoko is the former editor of the award-winning Daily Dispatch, Saturday Dispatch and DispatchLIVE. He has been with the Daily Dispatch since November 2004, having held many positions at the newspaper – news editor, managing editor, and deputy editor – before he was appointed editor in June 2013. He holds an MA in International Journalism from City University London, United Kingdom.

2020 to present: S'thembiso Msomi became the new editor in the first quarter of 2020. Msomi has 24 years of journalism experience and was editor of the Sowetan for two years before his most recent appointment. Msomi returns to the Sunday Times as he was previously deputy editor. He also held the position of political editor of the Sunday Times and City Press. He is the author of the unauthorised biography of the previous DA leader, Mmusi Maimane.

== Bibliography ==
- Allan, Jani (1980s). Face Value. Longstreet. ISBN 978-0-620-07013-3. (Collection of Just Jani columns originally published in the Sunday Times.)
- Bullard, David (2002). Out To Lunch. Jonathan Ball Publishers. (First edition of Out To Lunch columns originally published in the Sunday Times.)
- Bullard, David (2005). Out To Lunch Again. Jonathan Ball Publishers. (Second edition of Out To Lunch columns originally published in the Sunday Times.)
- Bullard, David (2007). Screw it, Let's Do Lunch!. Jonathan Ball Publishers. (Third edition of Out To Lunch columns originally published in the Sunday Times.)
- Dreyer, Nadine (2006). A Century of Sundays: 100 Years of Breaking News in the Sunday Times, 1906–2006. Zebra. (Centenary special edition compilation)
- Mervis, Joel (1989). The Fourth Estate, a newspaper story. Jonathan Ball Publishers.

== Distribution areas ==
Distribution
	2008	2018
Eastern Cape	Y	Y
Free State	Y	Y
Gauteng	Y	Y
Kwa-Zulu Natal	Y	Y
Limpopo	Y	Y
Mpumalanga	Y	Y
North West	Y	Y
Northern Cape	Y	Y
Western Cape	Y	Y

== Distribution figures ==
Circulation
	Net Sales
Oct – 12 Dec	449 799
Jul – 12 Sep	451 676
Apr – 12 Jun	452 785
Jan – 12 Mar	455 129

== Readership figures ==
Estimated Readership
	AIR
12 Jan – 12 Dec	3 411 000
11 Jul – 12 Jun	3 688 000

== Controversies ==
=== Accusations of fake news ===
On 27 November 2016, The Sunday Times published a story claiming that South African radio and television personality, and former Idols SA judge, Gareth Cliff had "admitted to giving fellow Idols SA judge Marah Louw the spiked drink that led to her notorious slurring and swearing on live TV", with further suggestions made that the incident had resulted in Louw's contract not being renewed. As a result of the article, Gareth Cliff was the victim of many insults on social media, before releasing a statement on Facebook confronting the false allegations printed in the Sunday Times. Susan Smuts, Managing Editor of the Times, responded to Cliff's lawyer, admitting that there had been "misinterpretations". Cliff, via his lawyer, demanded an unreserved apology from the Times.

== See also ==
- List of newspapers in South Africa
- Sunday Times Literary Awards
