= They Shaped Our Century =

They Shaped Our Century is a book which profiles the 100 people who had the greatest influence on South Africa during the twentieth century. The final list of 100 names was decided by an online survey run by South African media giant Media24. After voting closed, brief biographies were written for each person on the list; the book was published in 1999 by Human & Rousseau, in English and Afrikaans. This survey preceded the SABC Great South Africans survey by three years, and evoked less public outcry.

There were two father-son pairs and two husband-wife pairs in the final list, namely Ernest and Harry Oppenheimer, Govan and Thabo Mbeki, Nelson and Winnie Mandela, and Walter and Albertina Sisulu. One of the list candidates, André Brink, is also an author of some of the biographies in the book.

== Procedure of the survey ==
An initial list of 120 names was compiled by historian Trwella Cameron and publisher JJ Human. The names of B. J. Vorster and Chris Hani were initially deliberately left out. Users of Media24's web portal were asked to vote on the initial list and to submit suggestions for additions to the list. From the submissions, it was determined by the publisher that both B.J. Vorster and Chris Hani should be included in the list after all. People who were not South Africans, but who influenced South Africa, were also eligible for the list. During the survey and in the book, no labels such as "politician", "sportsperson", "activist" etc. were provided for the names.

Originally voting was scheduled to end in July 1999, but the deadline was later extended to 31 August, and then into October.

The voting portal contained a discussion forum so people could argue the merits or demerits of candidates. Members of the public could vote in favour of a candidate but could also vote against a candidate. All candidates' names on the web site linked to short profiles about them.

== Comparison with SABC Great South Africans survey ==
One of the ways in which this list differs from SABC3's Great South Africans list is that it contains very few sportsmen, and certainly none of the post-1994 heroes that featured prominently in the SABC list. The biographies printed in They Shaped Our Century are often cited as a source of information. The SABC survey was not limited to internet users and received coverage from many media outlets. In the SABC survey, one could vote for a candidate but not against a candidate.

== Criticism ==
Criticism against the survey included questions about why Gustav Preller did not make the list, or why statesmen Hertzog and Steyn were ranked below sportsman Gary Player, sportsman Danie Craven and stage artist Pieter-Dirk Uys. Another critic acclaimed the biographic article about Mandela (by Vincent Maphati) but derided the articles about Verwoerd as less than satisfactory. It was also said that the survey compared apples with oranges, and questions were raised about whether Chris Barnard could truly have been said to have had more influence than Harry Oppenheimer, Jan Smuts and Gary Player.

The survey's own web site fielded questions about the omission of Barney Barnato, Ysuf Veriava, Johan de Villiers, and Sammy Marks.

== Top 20 ==
These are the top 20 names published in the book. The labels are arbitrary and are not an indication of the field in which they contributed most to South Africa.

1. Nelson Mandela – statesman
2. Frederik Willem de Klerk – statesman
3. Hendrik Verwoerd – statesman
4. Chris Barnard – surgeon
5. Harry Oppenheimer – businessman
6. Jan Smuts – statesman
7. Gary Player – sportsman
8. Cornelis Jakob Langenhoven – author
9. Anton Rupert – businessman
10. Cecil John Rhodes – businessman
11. Danie Craven – sportsman
12. Desmond Tutu – cleric
13. Daniël Francois Malan – statesman
14. Helen Suzman – politician
15. Louis Botha – statesman
16. NP Van Wyk Louw – author
17. John Vorster – statesman
18. JBM Hertzog – statesman
19. Ernest Oppenheimer – businessman
20. Steve Biko – activist

== See also ==
- The 100: A Ranking of the Most Influential Persons in History, a 1978 book by Michael H. Hart.
- Greatest Britons spin-offs
- List of South Africans, Wikipedia's list of well-known South Africans
