= James Norval (actor) =

South African actor

- Born: 4 March 1908; Zastron
- Died: 16 November 1970
- Occupation: Actor

James Norval (1908–1970) was a South African theatre and film actor. He initially worked for the Hendrik Hanekom Company. In 1934 Hanekom retired to open a theatre school in Bloemfontein. Norval started his own group, the James Norval Company, and toured with plays such as Die Verlore Siel, Vadertjie Langbeen, Dracula and Gebeurtenis in die Nag.

Norval was married to actress Anna Cloete. Their only child, Paddy Norval, sometimes performed with them.

The South African Academy of Science and Arts honoured him with its Medal of Honour for Theatre in 1967.

== Filmography ==
As an actor:

- Kruger Miljoene, 1967
- Gevaarlike Spel, 1962
- Voor sononder, 1962 as gas in hotel
- Geheim van Onderplaas, 1962
- Stropers van die Laeveld, 1962
- The Hellions, 1961 as winkeleienaar (nie gekrediteer nie)
- Spore in die Modder, 1961
- Last of the Few, as Paul Kruger
- Nooi van my Hart, 1959 as mnr. Brand
- Paul Krüger, 1956 as Paul Krüger
- 'n Plan is 'n Boerdery, 1954
- Sarie Marais, 1949 as Hendrik
- Die kaskenades van Dr. Kwak, 1948
- Lig van 'n Eeu, 1942

As a director:

- Spore in die Modder, 1961
