= Hendrik Hanekom =

South African actor

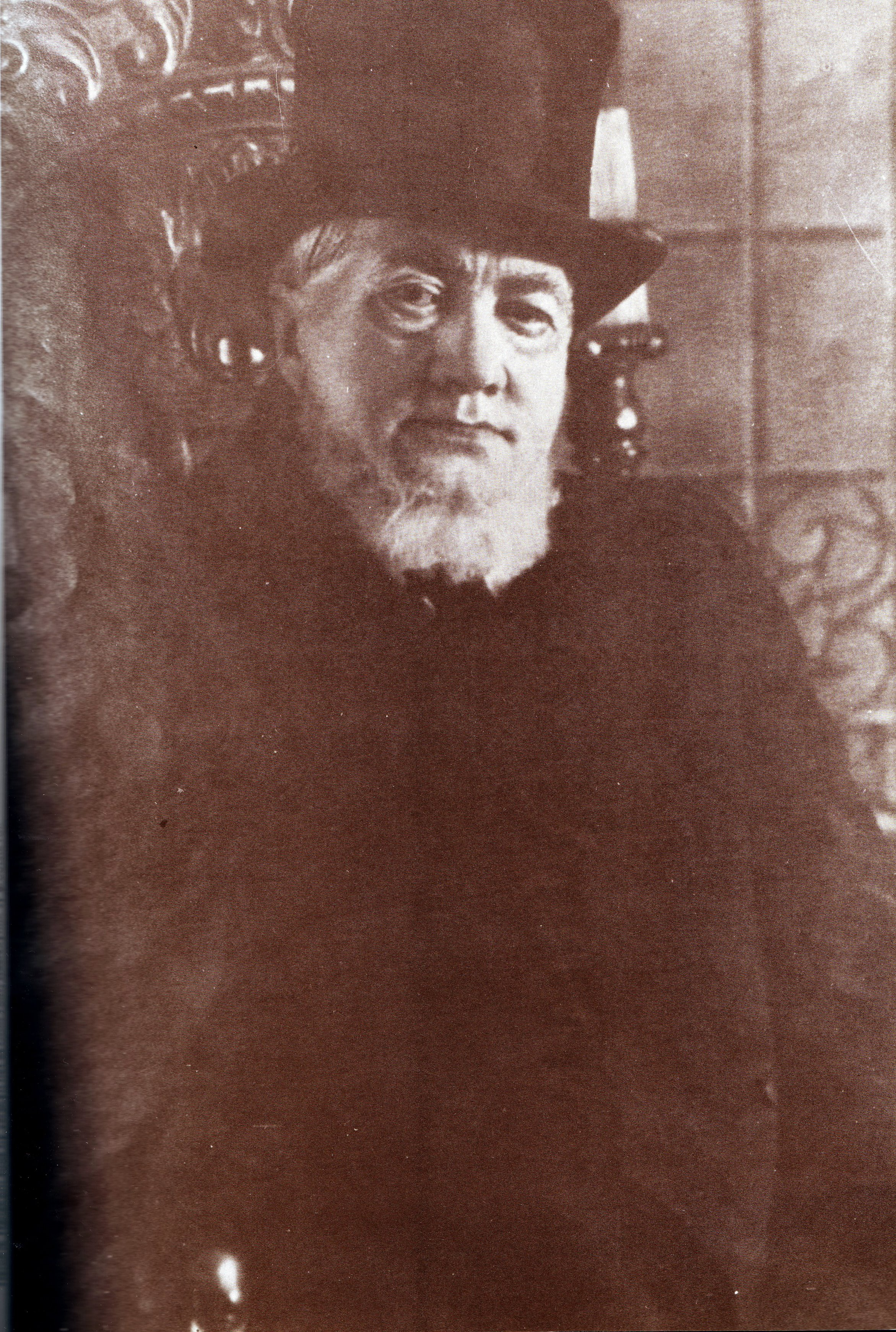
- Hanekom as he appeared as Oom Paul, probably his greatest role
- Born: Hendrik Andries Hanekom; 17 July 1896; Beaufort West
- Died: 11 January 1952 (aged 55); Strand, Western Cape
- Occupation: Actor
- Spouse: Mathilda Hanekom
- Children: Tilana Hanekom

Hendrik Andries Hanekom (17 July 1896 – 11 January 1952) was a pioneer of Afrikaans acting. He was married to Mathilda Hanekom (born De Beer) and they had a daughter, Tilana.

== Career ==
Hanekom started acting in 1912, among other things in his 1915 play Heldinne van die oorlog. In 1925, he and Mathilda founded Die Afrikaanse Toneelspelers, an Afrikaans theater company that existed for 27 years and toured the country.

Among the plays they performed were Oom Gawerjal, Liefde en geldsug, Hans die skipper (by D. F. Malherbe), Oom Paul (by Calman Postma), Oorskotjie, General De Wet (also by Postma) and Die stille haard. They also acted with Paul de Groot in plays such as Huis-toe and As mans huishou.

== Honors and awards ==
In 1945 they were jointly awarded the first Medal of Honor for Drama by the Suid-Afrikaanse Akademie vir Wetenskap en Kuns.

== Death ==
Hanekom died on 11 January 1952 at the age of 55.

== Filmography ==
- Lig van 'n Eeu, 1942
