= Lydia Lindeque =

South African actor

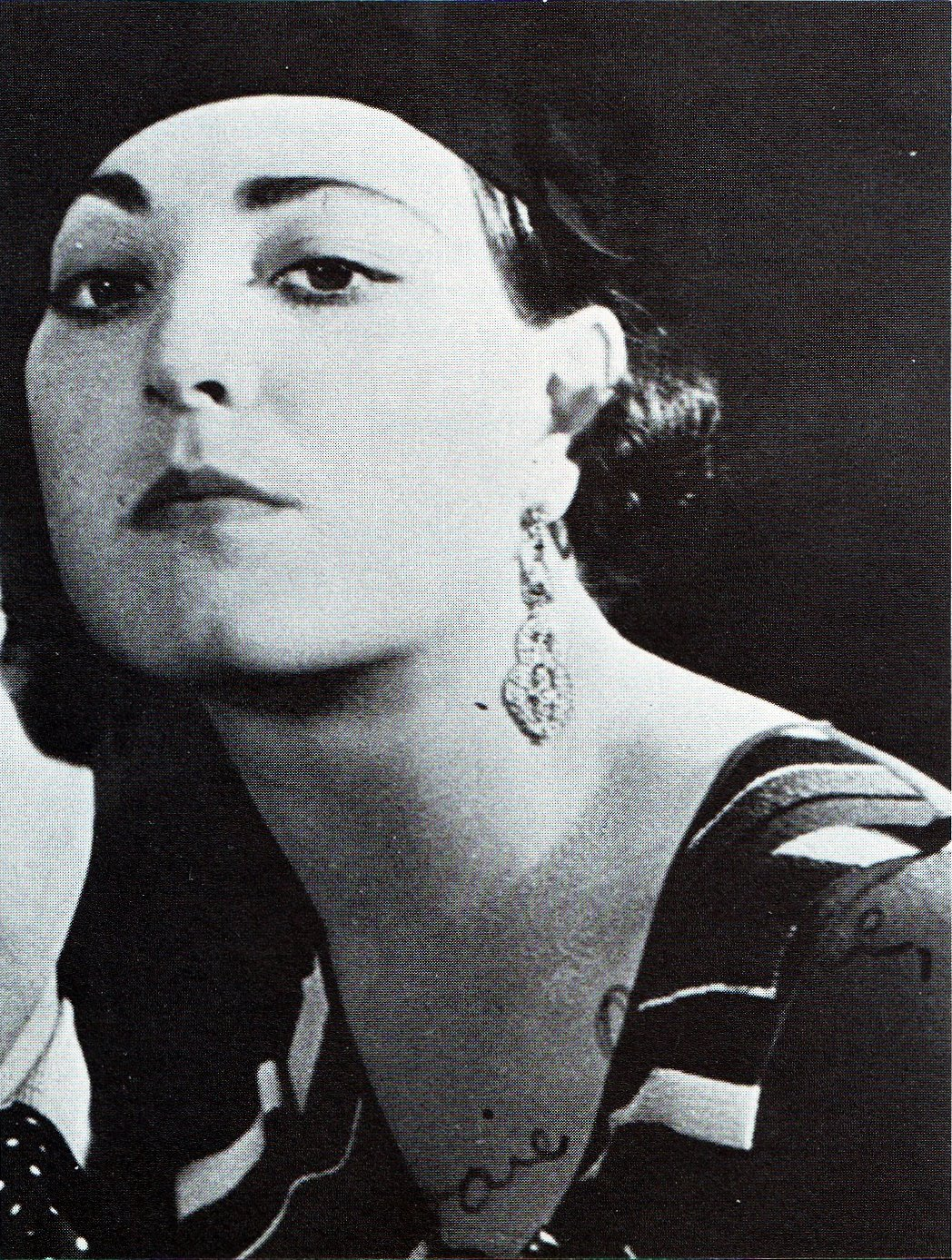
- Lydia Lindeque
- Born: Rachel Alida du Toit; 15 January 1916; Petrusburg, Union of South Africa
- Died: 16 July 1997 (aged 81); Andorra
- Occupation: Actor
- Years active: 1932—1976
- Spouse(s): Uys Krige, John Mantel
- Children: Eulalia, Taillefer

Lydia Lindeque, born Rachel Alida du Toit (15 January 1916 – 16 July 1997), was a South African actor of Afrikaner descent. Initially known by the stage name Alida du Toit, she started touring at the age of seventeen with Paul de Groot's acting company. Soon adopting the name Lydia Lindeque, she worked with many stars of the era over the following decades, including Taubie Kushlick in 1958. She first performed in English in 1943, in William Shakespeare's Twelfth Night, and, in 1945, travelled to Egypt and Italy to direct stage plays for the South African Army troops stationed there. She was married to the playwright Uys Krige in 1937, later separating and marrying John Mantel. After retiring in 1976, she died in Andorra in 1997.

== Career ==
Rachel Alida du Toit was born on 15 January 1916 in Petrusburg in the Union of South Africa, into an Afrikaner family. She attended school locally before leaving home to join Paul de Groot's acting company, starting touring at the age of seventeen. Initially, she performed in Afrikaans under the stage name Alida du Toit, but later adopted the name Lydia Lindeque. By 1936, she was a regular performer in Johannesburg, appearing alongside actors like Andre Huguenot. In 1938, she acted in Uys Krige's first play, Magdalena Retief, the first in an increasingly productive collaboration between the two. Her repertoire expanded, and so did her profile. In 1942, she starred in an Afrikaans translation of Ladies in Retirement alongside Berdine Grunwald. The following year, she performed in William Shakespeare's Twelfth Night, her first performance in English.

In 1945, she travelled to Egypt to direct entertainment for the troops of the South African Army left in the country as their involvement in the Second World War ended. The first production, of Die Rooi Pruik, was performed on 3 August. She subsequently also directed performances in Allied-occupied Italy during the year. At the end of this service, she returned to South Africa and, in 1952, she starred alongside Vivienne Drummond in the Greek political comedy Lysistrata. She continued to work with new directors and, in 1958, she appeared alongside Leon Gluckman in Taubie Kushlick’s production of The Rope Dancers.

== Family life ==
Lindeque married the playwright Uys Krige in 1937. They had two children, a daughter named Eulalia and a son called Taillefer, born in 1937 and 1944 respectively. However, the family struggled with income. They separated about the time of their younger child's birth and later married John Mantel. She left South Africa and retired to Andorra in 1976 with Mantel and, on 16 July 1997, she died in their home there.
