= Tertius Myburgh =

South African journalist and editor

- Born: Albert Tertius Myburgh; 26 December 1934
- Died: 2 December 1990 (aged 55)
- Education: University of Cape Town; Harvard University
- Occupations: Journalist and Editor
- Spouse: Wilhelmina Madgalenda "Helmine" Loubser (m. 1958)
- Children: Phillip, Danielle & Jacqueline

Albert Tertius Myburgh (26 December 1936 – 2 December 1990) was a South African journalist and editor, best known as editor of the Sunday Times between 1975 and 1990.

== Background ==
Myburgh was the son of Albert Lambert Myburgh. He was educated at Dale College Boys' High School in King William's Town in the Eastern Cape and later studied at the University of Cape Town. Between 1965 and 1966, he was a Nieman Fellow of journalism at Harvard University.

In the United States, he specialized in the fields of politics, economics and foreign affairs. He died at age 55, two months after learning he had terminal cancer. He was survived by his wife, Helmine and their three children (two daughters, Danielle, a housewife, and Jaqueline, a reporter, and a son, Phillip, a lawyer).

== Career ==
Myburgh's began his career at The Friend newspaper in Bloemfontein followed by two years working at the London office of the Argus newspaper group. He later returned to South Africa and became political and parliamentary reporter for The Star in Johannesburg in 1963. In 1967 he became assistant editor of the Daily News. Between 1971 and March 1975 he served as editor of the Pretoria News and in April 1975 became editor of the largest newspaper in South Africa, The Sunday Times.

Myburgh was also published by international titles, as a South African associate for The New York Times and Time. He also contributed to the Christian Science Monitor, the Financial Times and the Daily Express.
