= Mathilda Hanekom =

South African actress

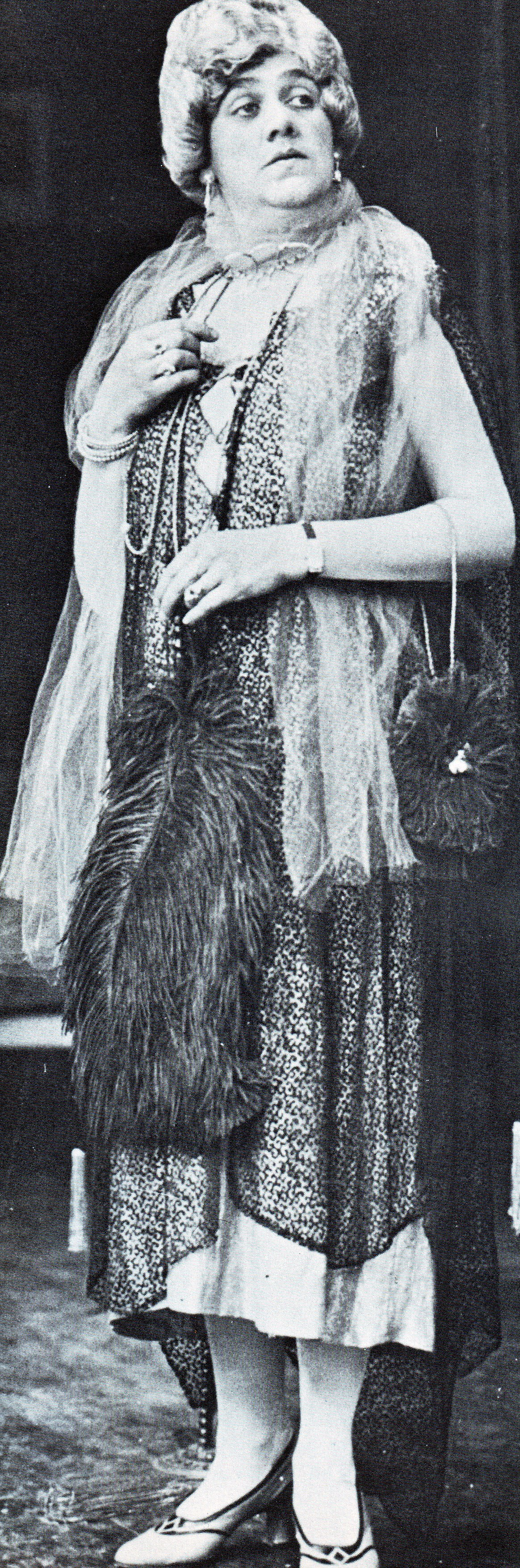
- Born: Mathilda de Beer; 9 December 1899; Prince Albert
- Died: 6 January 1977 (aged 77); Pretoria
- Occupation: Actress
- Spouse: Hendrik Hanekom
- Children: Tilana Hanekom

Mathilda Hanekom (born de Beer) (9 December 1899 – 6 January 1977) was a pioneer of Afrikaans acting. She was married to Hendrik Hanekom and they had a daughter, Tilana.

In 1925, she and Hendrik founded Die Afrikaanse Toneelspelers, an Afrikaans theater company that existed for 27 years and toured the country. Among the plays they performed were Oom Gawerjal, Liefde en Geldsug, Hans die Skipper, Oom Paul, Oorskotjie, Onskuldig Verordeel, General De Wet and Die Stille Haard.

In 1945 they were jointly awarded the first Medal of Honor for Drama by the Suid-Afrikaanse Akademie vir Wetenskap en Kuns. After Hendrik's death in 1952, Mathilda continued acting. She died on 6 January 1977 aged 77 in Pretoria.

== Filmography ==
- Die Lig van 'n Eeu, 1942
- Ek Sal Opstaan, 1959
- Die Wonderwêreld van Kammie Kamfer, 1965
- Bennie-Boet, 1967
