= Beauty and the Bester =

2025 true crime docuseries

- Promotional poster
- Genre: Docu-series; true crime
- Based on: Thabo Bester's escape from the Mangaung Prison
- Directed by: Anthony Molyneaux
- Music by: Siyabonga Sithole; Sean Ou Tim; Fezile Thela
- Original language: English
- No. of seasons: 1
- No. of episodes: 3

Production
- Executive producers: Neil Brandt; Laura Colucci; Thandi Davids
- Production location: South Africa
- Cinematography: Shaun Harley Lee
- Editor: Ruane Van Rooyen
- Camera setup: Single
- Running time: 40–49 minutes
- Production company: Storyscope

Original release
- Network: Netflix
- Release: 12 September 2025

Beauty and the Bester is a 2025 three-part true crime documentary series that explores the story of convicted South African murderer and rapist Thabo Bester, who faked his death and escaped from prison in 2022, and his relationship with the celebrity doctor Nandipha Magudumana, who allegedly helped facilitate the escape. It was produced by Storyscope and released on Netflix on 12 September 2025.

The docu-series delves into themes of crime, deception, prison breaks, and the ties between Magudumana and Bester, drawing comparisons to stories like Bonnie and Clyde. It received mixed reviews from critics and media outlets, who largely praised its authenticity. Beauty and the Bester is the second documentary on the subject, following Showmax's Tracking Thabo Bester, which was released in 2024. Magudumana is currently incarcerated at the Bizzah Makhate Correctional Centre, a women-only prison in Kroonstad, Free State. Bester is held in C-Max, a maximum-security division of Kgosi Mampuru prison in Pretoria.

== Production and release ==
From executive producers Neil Brandt, Laura Colucci, and Thandi Davids, Beauty and the Bester is a three-episode true crime documentary released on Netflix on 12 September 2025, and presented by the production company Storyscope. It explores the prison escape of South African convicted murderer and rapist Thabo Bester. Directed by Anthony Molyneaux, it delves into the story of Bester, and his connection with the celebrity doctor Nandipha Magudumana, who is alleged to have assisted in his escape. Siyabonga Sithole, Sean Ou Tim, and Fezile Thela composed the score for the documentary.

The documentary employs a nonlinear narrative structure, featuring talking-head interviews with journalists, a judge, family members, friends, coworkers, and survivors. It combines investigative journalism, raw interviews, and archival footage. However, some reviews suggest that the timeline can feel cluttered and might benefit from a more linear approach.

== Backstory ==
Thabo Bester, born on 13 June 1986 at Chris Hani Baragwanath Hospital in Soweto, South Africa, gained infamy as the "Facebook Rapist" for using social media to target victims. Known for his manipulative charm and intelligence, he deceived both victims and authorities, establishing himself as one of South Africa's most notorious con men. His criminal activities extended beyond his publicized offenses, culminating in a sophisticated prison escape that highlighted his ability to manipulate people and situations.

Nandipha Magudumana (née Sekeleni), born 15 September 1989 in Bizana, Eastern Cape, and raised in Port Edward, KwaZulu-Natal, graduated with medical degrees from the University of the Witwatersrand in 2013. She worked at Edenvale and Far East Rand Hospitals, specializing in anesthesiology, dermatology, and plastic surgery. In 2017, she founded Optimum Medical Aesthetics Solutions in Sandton, Gauteng. Married to Mkhuseli Magudumana in 2013, with two children, they remain legally married despite separation. Her medical license expired in 2021, and in 2023, the Democratic Alliance requested its revocation due to unpaid fees.

Magudumana claimed she first met Bester at the University of Witswatersrand in 2006, where he allegedly studied theology. However, according to the Department of Home Affairs, Bester only has a grade 7 education. According to GroundUp, Magudumana began visiting Bester in prison in 2017 while he was serving three concurrent life sentences for two counts of rape, one count of murder, and armed robbery. Magudumana stated that she began dating him in 2017, and he paid lobola for her in 2020. The pair co-founded Arum Properties, a construction company in 2021. GroundUp used a March 2023 piece to allege that they used the firm to scam people, and that it convinced numerous people to pay millions of rands for renovations and construction projects of which they never delivered.

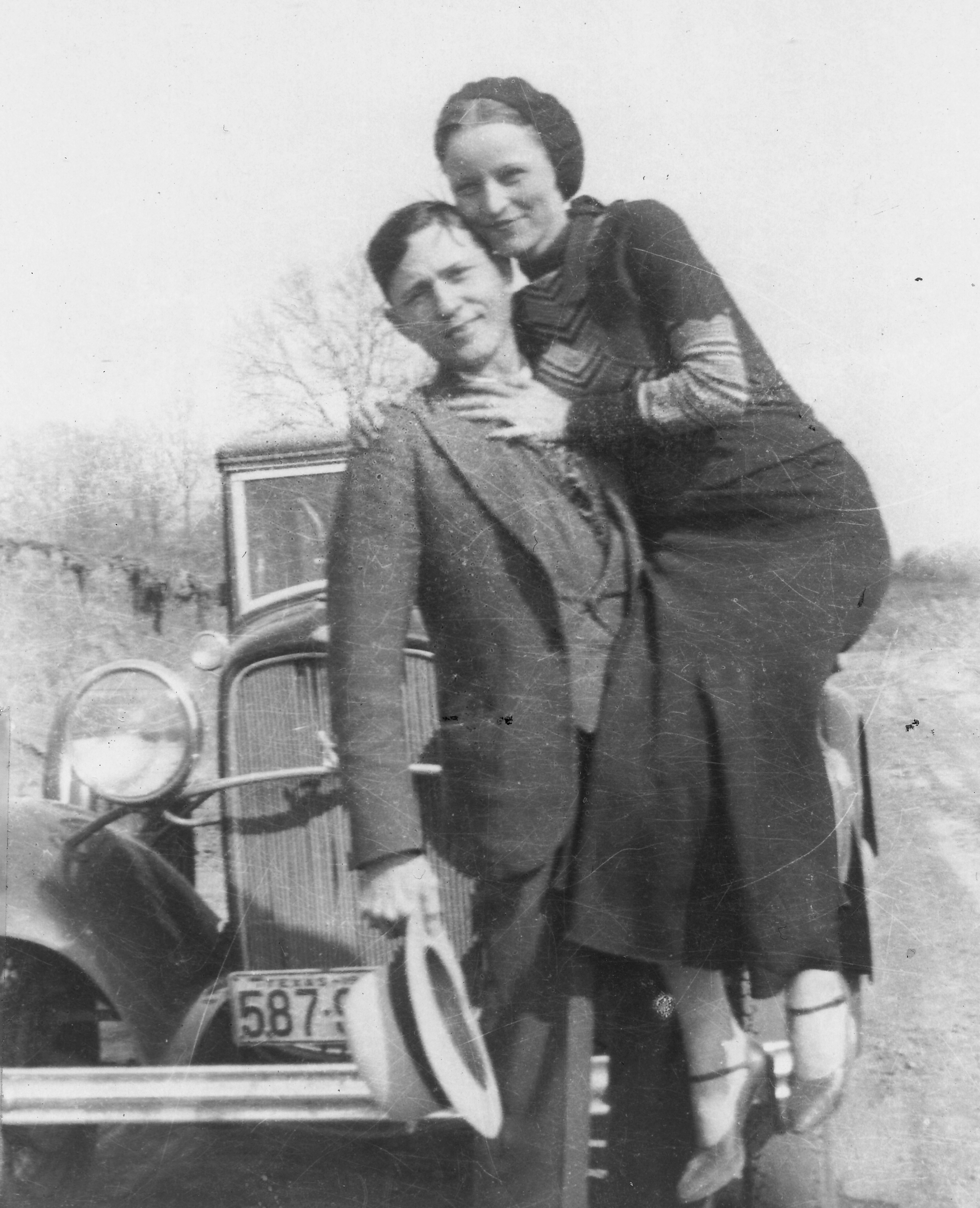
Nandipha Magudumana and Thabo Bester are frequently likened to the American outlaw couple, Bonnie and Clyde.

In May 2022, Bester allegedly faked his death and escaped from Mangaung Prison, a private facility operated by G4S. On 7 April 2023, Magudumana was arrested in Arusha, Tanzania, alongside Bester, and extradited to South Africa six days later. Their car journey from South Africa to Tanzania, echoing Bonnie and Clyde's tale through their audacious crimes and romantic bond, ended with their dramatic apprehension in Arusha, fueling widespread comparisons in modern media and public discourse. Magudumana has since been detained at the Bizzah Makhate Correctional Centre, a women-only prison, in Kroonstad, Free State. Bester is held in C-Max, a maximum-security division at Kgosi Mampuru prison in Pretoria.

== Dispute ==
To promote Beauty and the Bester, Netflix announced its release date of 12 September 2025, on 20 August 2025, and unveiled a trailer on their social media accounts.

Prior to the release, Bester and his co-accused, Magudumana, filed an injunction in the Pretoria High Court on 11 September 2025 to permanently block Netflix from releasing and promoting Beauty and the Bester without Bester's consent. Their lawyers argued that the documentary contained defamatory content.

On behalf of Netflix, Advocate Tembeka Ngcukaitobi informed the court that Netflix contends Magudumana was paid for granting access to her archives, which were incorporated into the documentary. Ngcukaitobi argued that it would be shocking if the court blocked the documentary's release, as it primarily draws on publicly disclosed information. The documentary compiles and presents material that has been widely available through investigative journalism, parliamentary discussions, and social media. On 12 September 2025, the judge presiding over the case ruled in Netflix's favour and added that the pair would still be free to sue for defamation if they wished, only after the documentary had aired. Beauty and the Bester was aired hours after the judgment was delivered.

== Reception ==
Beauty and the Bester received mixed reviews from critics and media outlets, which mostly praised its authenticity.

Roland Simpi Motaung of the Mail & Guardian said, "it's nothing new under the sun", as he was unimpressed by the new voice notes and interviews from survivors and former co-workers of Magudumana. He added that everything had already been covered in the Showmax documentary Tracking Thabo Bester, which had the most first-day views of any documentary on Showmax. Writing for Entertainment Weekly, Randall Colburn frames the documentary as "all too real", blending celebrity scams, charred corpses, and escapes into a narrative that "sounds like the stuff of fiction", positioning it as a must-watch for its bizarre authenticity.

Naomi May of Elle magazine labels it one of the "most scandalous true crime documentaries of recent years", emphasizing its chilling escalation of Bester's crimes and global buzz, despite pre-release legal challenges claiming defamation. Fihlani Phumza of BBC News noted that the coverage focuses more on the controversy than on the content, reporting on Bester's lost court bid to block the "defamatory" release, which inadvertently amplified the hype but highlighted the documentary's potential to prejudice his trial.

== Credits ==
Adapted from the Netflix broadcast.

- Judge Edwin Cameron – judicial inspectorate for correctional services
- Megan Baardjies – crime journalist
- Pearl Thusi – actress and entertainer
- Meisie Mabaso – Bester's mother
- Marecia Damons – GroundUp journalist
- Dr Lucy Higgins – guest house owner
- Calvin Rafadi – forensic investigator
- Nkosinathi Sekeleni – Magudumana's brother
- Mr and Mrs Sekeleni – Magudumana's parents
- Katlego Bereng – images of the person whose body was charred and used as a decoy for the escape
- Poppie Bereng – Katlego's aunt
- Monica Matsie – Katlego's mother
- Dr. Mmeraka "Phashy" Ntshani – medical practitioner
- Happy Simelane – entrepreneur and TV personality

== Episodes ==
No.	Title	Directed by	Teleplay by	Original release date
1	"A Monster is Dead"	Anthony Molyneaux	Unknown	12 September 2025
Covering the initial fire and the faked death, a notorious criminal's life is cut short in fire, sparking widespread shock. However, as suspicions of foul play surfaces, investigators launch a probe to uncover the truth.
2	"Ride or Die"	Anthony Molyneaux	Unknown	12 September 2025
The post-mortem examination has exposed a disturbing reality about Bester's craving for freedom, while those close to Dr Nandipha fear she has fallen blindly in love.
3	"Everything to Lose"	Anthony Molyneaux	Unknown	12 September 2025
The second they crossed into Tanzania, it became an international manhunt.
