= Marecia Damons =

South African journalist (born 1997)

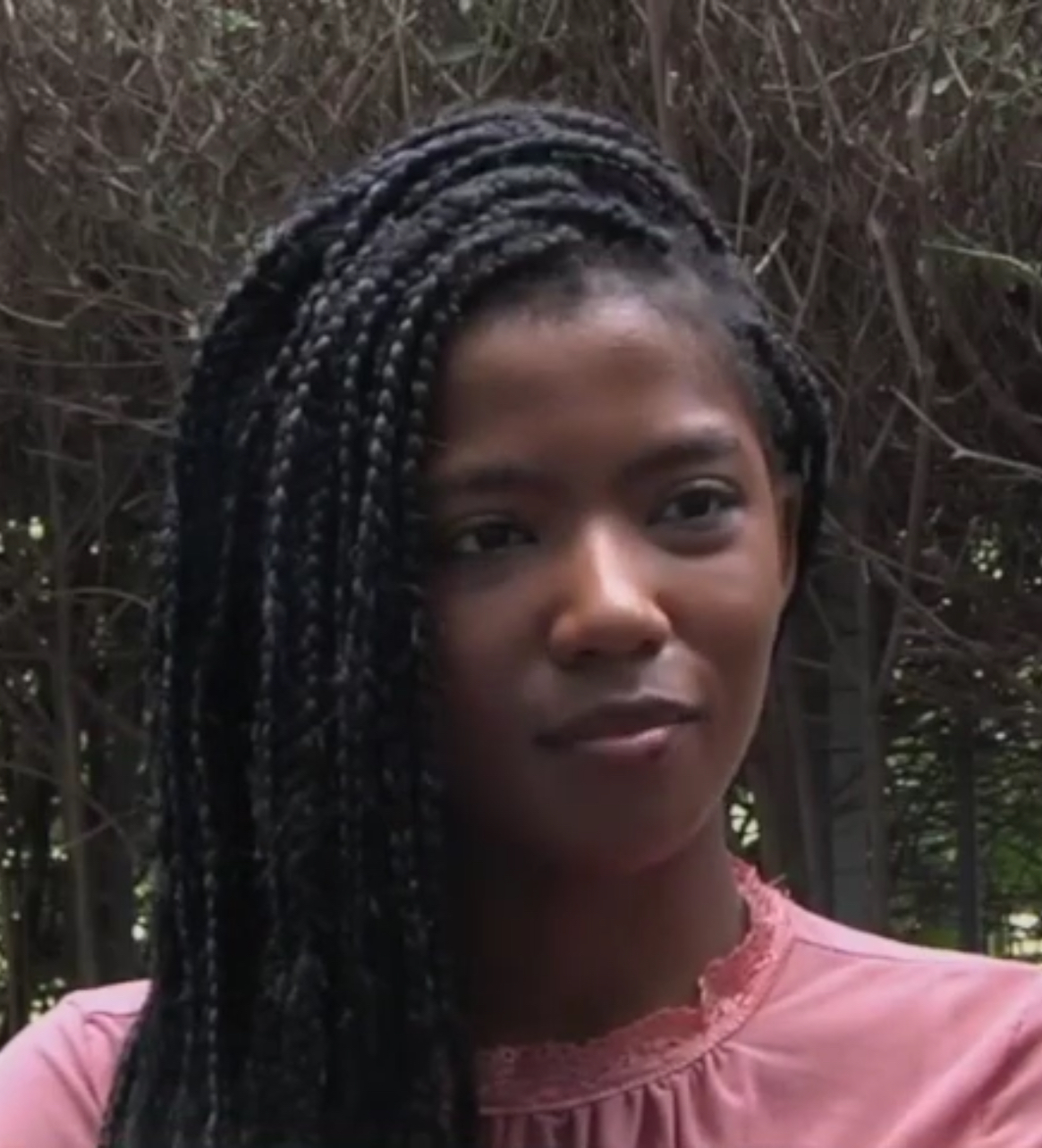
- Damons in 2023
- Born: Marecia Lizelle Damons; 10 October 1997 (age 28); George, South Africa
- Education: Stellenbosch University
- Occupation: Journalist
- Years active: 2020–present

Marecia Lizelle Damons (born 10 October 1997) is a South African journalist at GroundUp. For their investigation and coverage of the Thabo Bester case, Damons and her colleague Daniel Steyn won the Nat Nakasa Award for Media Integrity, the Taco Kuiper Award and Vodacom Journalist of the Year.

== Early life ==
Damons is from George. Damons attended York High School, matriculating in 2015. She graduated with degrees in Journalism and Language and Culture from Stellenbosch University. During her time at Stellenbosch, Damons hosted The Morning Glory, Detour and Weekend Drive on the student radio station MFM 92.6.

== Career ==
During the COVID-19 lockdown, Damons joined the non-profit news agency GroundUp as an intern. The following year, she returned to GroundUp after being hired as a reporter. Topics of her early work included education, housing, public services and the judiciary.

=== Thabo Bester case ===
After Thabo Bester's reported self-immolation at the Mangaung Prison in May 2022, GroundUp editor Nathan Geffen confidentially approached Damons with rumours Bester had faked his death and escaped prison. This was leaked to Geffen by Edwin Cameron, a GroundUp board member who had reason to doubt the body's identity and was frustrated by the complacency of public officials. Damons began investigating the case and in October 2022, published her first article raising this doubt.

In early 2023, fellow GroundUp journalist Daniel Steyn joined Damons on the case. Damons and Steyn gathered and published several further pieces of evidence proving Cameron's suspicions true; as the story gained traction in March 2023, Damons recalled needing to "get these stories out quickly" due to "other news outlets that are better resourced than us". At the end of March, the Department of Correctional Services (DCS) confirmed the allegations. In April, Bester and his accomplice Nandipha Magudumana were caught as fugitives in Tanzania and returned to South Africa be rearrested. In addition, Damons and Steyn found an old email from 2020 uncovering that Bester had run the 21st Century Media Company from prison under the alias Tom Motsepe.

Later that year in autumn 2023, Damons and Steyn's book The Thabo Bester Story: The Facebook Rapist, the Celebrity Doctor and the Escape from Cell 35 was published via NB Publishers in autumn 2023. Bester and Magudumana threatened legal action over the book's publication, but NB Publishers maintained they had the right to publish it and "all standard protocols were followed". Damons and Steyn jointly won the 2023 Nat Nakasa Award for Media Integrityand the main prize at the Vodacom Journalist of the Year Awards, and the 2024 Taco Kuiper Award.

Damons featured in the true crime documentary series Tracking Thabo Bester on Showmax in 2024 and Beauty and the Bester on Netflix in 2025.

== Bibliography ==
- The Thabo Bester Story: The Facebook Rapist, the Celebrity Doctor and the Escape from Cell 35 (2023) with Daniel Steyn

== Accolades ==
- 2023: Nat Nakasa Award for Media Integrity (Note: Shared with Daniel Steyn.)
- 2023: Vodacom Journalist of the Year Award (Note: Shared with Daniel Steyn.)
- 2024: Taco Kuiper Award (Note: Shared with Daniel Steyn.)
