= Billy Downer =

South African prosecutor

Billy Downer SC
- Born: William John Downer; 1956 (age 69–70)
- Education: Pretoria Boys High School; Stellenbosch University; Brasenose College, Oxford
- Years active: 1982–present
- Spouse: William de Villiers (m. 2009)

William John Downer SC (born 1956) is a retired South African prosecutor. A specialist in commercial crime, he is best known for his prosecution of high-profile public corruption cases, especially the Arms Deal prosecutions of former President Jacob Zuma and his financial adviser Schabir Shaik.

== Early life and education ==
Downer was born in 1956 in suburban Pretoria, where he attended Pretoria Boys High School. His parents were middle-class United Party supporters; his mother was a physiotherapist and his father, formerly a colonel in the South African Air Force, was a manager at the law firm Adams & Adams.

Downer considered pursuing a career in theatre. However, after matriculating, he attended Stellenbosch University, where he lived at Dagbreek and completed a law degree in 1979. Thereafter he went to Brasenose College, Oxford as a Rhodes Scholar; he graduated with a Bachelor of Civil Law.

== Career as a prosecutor ==
Downer was admitted as an advocate in the Pretoria High Court in 1980, with a family friend, Frank Kirk-Cohen, appearing for him. Upon his return from Oxford, he joined the Department of Justice in October 1982; his first job was as a prosecutor in the Magistrate's Court in Kuils River outside Cape Town. Shortly thereafter he was conscripted into the apartheid-era South African Defence Force, and he spent two years as an army legal adviser. He returned to the Department of Justice as a prosecutor at the Wynberg Magistrate's Court, and in 1986 he was recruited into the office of Neil Rossouw, the Attorney-General for the Cape Province.

Under the mentorship of Rossouw's successor, Frank Kahn, Downer developed a specialism in commercial prosecutions. He continued to work as a state advocate in a similar capacity after the attorney-general's office was merged into the post-apartheid National Prosecuting Authority (NPA). In 2008 he publicly opposed President Thabo Mbeki's decision to disband the Scorpions. He retired in 2021.

=== Jacob Zuma prosecution ===
Downer is best known to the public for his role in prosecuting former President Jacob Zuma on fraud and corruption charges related to the 1999 Arms Deal. Downer was appointed to the Arms Deal investigation in 2000, while Zuma was the Deputy President, and he initially focused on the leg of the investigation that targeted Chippy Shaik and Schabir Shaik. In 2004 and 2005 he led the prosecution of Schabir Shaik in a trial that culminated with Shaik's conviction on charges of bribing Zuma. Meanwhile, when related charges were brought against Zuma, he was also made the leading prosecutor on the Zuma case. Journalist Sam Sole claimed that state agents surveilled his private telephone conversations with Downer about the case.

The prosecution of Zuma has taken many years with Zuma having been accused of using Stalingrad tactics to evade his day in court. Zuma objected to Downer's involvement in his case and claimed that the retired prosecutor acted unlawfully by leaking information to the media. Downer has previously been accused of leaking information to journalists to benefit his public image and his cases. Zuma instituted a private prosecution in the high court against Downer on 5 September 2022, as well as against journalist Karyn Maughan, but in April 2024 this prosecution was struck off the roll of the KwaZulu-Natal Division of the High Court in Pietermaritzburg, although it might be reinstated if an appeal by Zuma to the Constitutional Court succeeds.

== Personal life ==
Downer lives with his partner, lawyer William de Villiers, in Cape Town. They married in 2009.
