= Karyn Maughan =

South African journalist

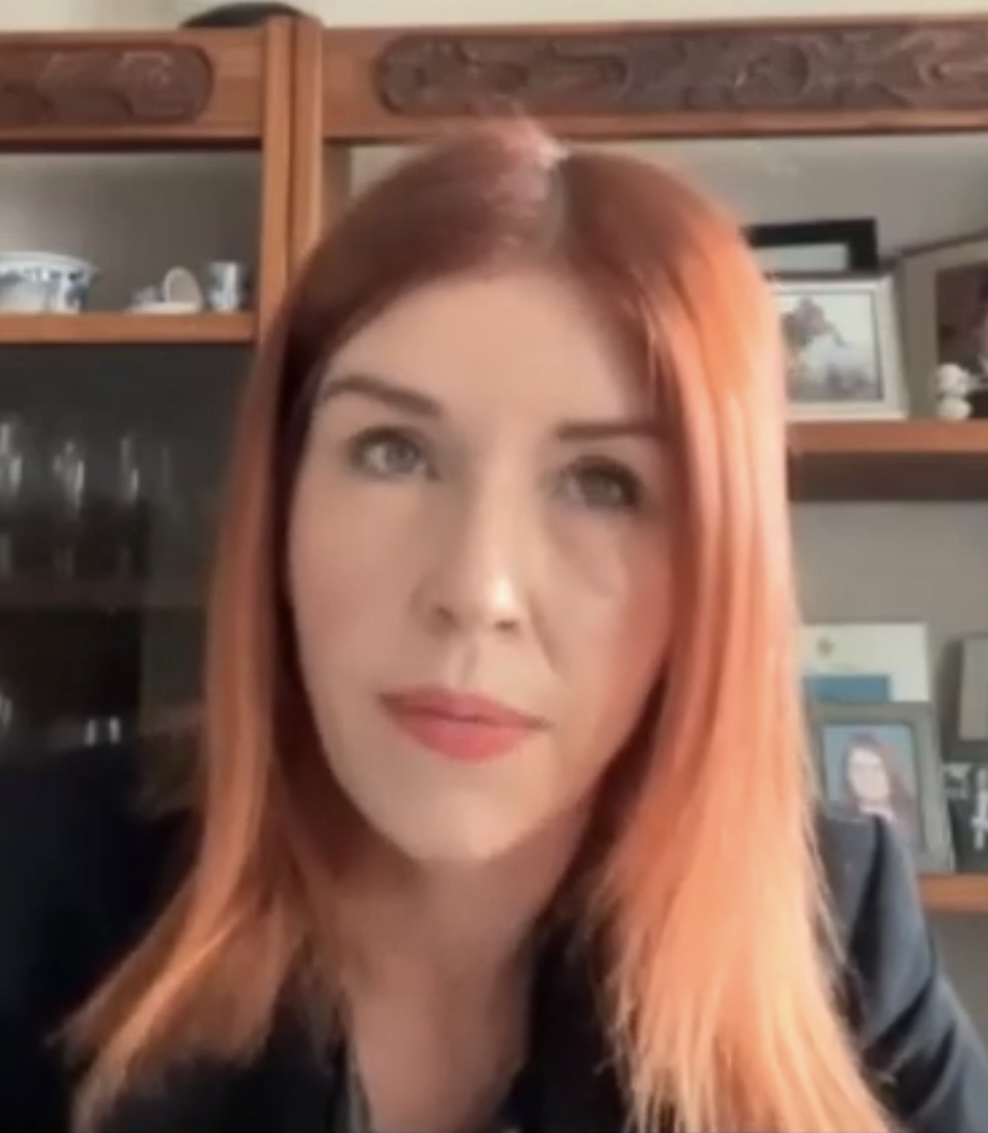
- Maughan in 2024
- Born: 1978 or 1979 (age 46–47)
- Citizenship: South African
- Education: Rhodes University
- Occupation: Journalist
- Employer: News24

Karyn Maughan (born 1978 or 1979) is a South African legal journalist. She has worked for News24 since November 2020 and formerly worked in broadcast journalism for eNCA. She rose to national prominence for her reporting during the corruption trial of former President Jacob Zuma, as well as for Zuma's subsequent attempt to bring related criminal charges against her in private prosecution.

== Early life and education ==
Born in 1978 or 1979, Maughan grew up in Cape Town. In 2003, she completed a master's degree in journalism at Rhodes University.

== Career in journalism ==
While she was a student, Maughan's first vacation job was as an entry-level general reporter at the Cape Argus in the late 1990s. She entered court reporting as a young journalist when she was assigned to cover the High Court of South Africa, and she ultimately took over permanently from her mentor, Argus court reporter Estelle Ellis. She later moved to Johannesburg to work as a reporter for the Star. Between 2010 and 2018, she worked in broadcast journalism as a legal journalist at eNCA, where she covered the Oscar Pistorius trial. Thereafter she worked freelance before joining News24 at a specialist legal writer in November 2020. She also frequently provides legal commentary on radio, television, and Twitter, where she has over 400,000 followers.

At the 2022 Vodacom Journalist of the Year Awards for the region of Gauteng, Maughan received a commendation in the breaking news category for her live coverage of the Gupta brothers' arrest in Dubai earlier that year. At the 2023 awards for the region of the Western Cape, she and Jan Gerber received the political journalism award – shared with Jason Felix – for their reporting on the impeachment of Busisiwe Mkhwebane. Also in 2022 she received an alumni award from the Rhodes University School of Journalism and Media Studies.

== Prosecution by Jacob Zuma ==
Maughan became a household name in 2022, when former President Jacob Zuma brought criminal charges against her in private prosecution. The charges were brought against Maughan and Billy Downer, the lead prosecutor in the National Prosecuting Authority's pending corruption charges against Zuma; at the time, Zuma was attempting to have Downer removed from his corruption trial. Among his complaints against Downer was that Downer had, in Zuma's account, leaked his confidential medical records to the press. The accusation emanated from the fact that, in August 2021, prosecutors had provided Maughan with a copy of court documents which included a letter from a military doctor about Zuma's medical condition; she had obtained the documents with an undertaking not to publish any information therein until after the documents had been filed in court. After Zuma filed charges against her in September 2022, Maughan filed an urgent application to halt Zuma's private prosecution, inter alia on the grounds that she had not perpetrated any leak because she had not reported on the documents until they were part of the public court record.

Downer and Maughan were represented in court by Geoff Budlender and his son, Steven Budlender, respectively. Represented by Max du Plessis, three media organisations – the South African National Editors' Forum, Media Monitoring Africa, and the Campaign for Free Expression – joined the case as amici curiae to argue that the private prosecution against Maughan constituted a strategic lawsuit against public participation (SLAPP). The same organisations, as well as the Committee to Protect Journalists, lent Maughan public support during the trial. Indeed, mainstream commentators were in universal agreement that the prosecution of Maughan was an attack on press freedom, and Pierre de Vos and others also argued that it was an extension of the so-called Stalingrad tactics by which Zuma attempted to forestall his own corruption prosecution.

On 7 June 2023, the Pietermaritzburg High Court ruled in Maughan's favour, holding that Zuma was not entitled to a private prosecution against Maughan. The court found that Zuma had not obtained the requisite nolle prosequi certificate. In addition to these technical grounds, the court agreed with the argument that the private prosecution resembled a SLAPP suit and violated Maughan's constitutional right to freedom of expression.

Zuma applied for leave to appeal the High Court's decision, but Maughan and Downer succeeded in obtaining an enforcement order which prevented him from pursuing the private prosecution while the appeal was pending. The Supreme Court of Appeal upheld that order in October 2023, and in April 2024 another High Court judge struck Zuma's private prosecution from the roll. Nonetheless, Zuma continued a legal campaign to have the private prosecution proceed, ultimately approaching the Constitutional Court. Related litigation also engaged sitting President Cyril Ramaphosa in the saga: Zuma sought to institute a private prosecution against Ramaphosa after Ramaphosa declined his request to establish a commission of inquiry to investigate the purported collusion between Maughan and Downer.

== Harassment ==
In its June 2023 judgment in the Zuma matter, the Pietermaritzburg High Court observed that Maughan had been subject to extensive social media abuse and threats, including from Zuma's daughter, Duduzile Zuma, and from the Jacob Zuma Foundation and its spokesperson Mzwanele Manyi. In mid-2020, for example, #KarynMaughanMustFall trended on South African Twitter. Although this abuse originated in her reporting on Zuma, it continued afterwards. In November 2022, for example, Zuma supporter Carl Niehaus – commenting on Maughan's reporting about Busisiwe Mkhwebane, another Zuma ally – wrote on Twitter:

Eish Karyn Maughan, you are at it again? You haven't learnt your lesson yet? You are a slow learner. We must keep on kicking this dog harder, so that her owner who pays her comes out.

Maughan was also denigrated in opinion pieces published by Iqbal Survé's Independent Media, with one commentator accusing Survé of "encouraging his followers to pile on [to Maughan] with hate speech, vicious threats and, ultimately, actual physical violence". A January 2024 piece in the Sunday Independent, which claimed Maughan was "South Africa's highest-paid journalist", suggested that her employment by News24 constituted "a collaboration rooted in the influence of the ruling white monopoly capital". A March 2024 piece in the same newspaper compared her with Nazi propagandist Leni Riefenstahl in the course of questioning Maughan's reporting on Survé's company, Sekunjalo Investment Holdings. After the latter piece was published, News24 laid a formal complaint against Independent Media at the Press Council.

== Books ==
Maughan co-wrote three books: Lolly Jackson: When Fantasy Becomes Reality (2012) with Sean Newman and Peter Piegl, about assassinated Teazers' owner Lolly Jackson; Love is War: The Modimolle Monster (2013) with Shaun Swingler, a true crime book about Modimolle rapist Johan Kotze; and Nuclear: Inside South Africa's Secret Deal (2018) with Kirsten Pearson, about the abortive Russian nuclear deal.

== Personal life ==
She was diagnosed with type one diabetes as a child. She was hospitalised with COVID-19 in July 2021.
