= Sam Sole =

South African journalist

- Born: Stephen Patrick Sole
- Education: South African College Schools
- Alma mater: University of Cape Town
- Occupation: Investigative journalist
- Years active: 1986–present
- Organization: amaBhungane (since 2010)
- Father: Donald Bell Sole

Stephen Patrick "Sam" Sole is a South African investigative journalist. He is the co-founder and managing director of the amaBhungane Centre for Investigative Journalism. Before the centre became independent in April 2016, he was a journalist for the Mail & Guardian. Since 2003 he has won both the Vodacom Journalist of the Year Award and the Taco Kuiper Award for Investigative Journalism on multiple occasions.

== Early life and education ==
Sole's father was Donald Sole, a diplomat who during Sole's childhood was the South African Ambassador to the Federal Republic of Germany and then the South African Ambassador to the United States. Sole was a boarding student at the South African College Schools (SACS) in Cape Town, where he acquired the nickname "Sam" from his English teacher. After matriculating in 1979, he failed to persuade his parents to allow him to study drama; instead he enrolled in a Bachelor of Science in computer science at the University of Cape Town but found that he was "neither very good nor very interested". He transferred to a Bachelor of Arts and then dropped out entirely in favour of working.

In mid-1984, after a brief hitchhiking tour of Europe, Sole was conscripted into the South African Defence Force. He later said that he considered leaving the country but enlisted to confront both the "ugly realities" of apartheid-era South Africa and his "doubts about my own courage". He was a rifleman in the 6 South African Infantry Battalion in Grahamstown, which was deployed to nearby townships to quell ongoing civil unrest.

Sole was in the defence force for two years. During that time, in 1985, he wrote his first newspaper article, an account of police and military actions in the townships during the prevailing state of emergency; he submitted it to the End Conscription Campaign, which arranged for it to be printed anonymously on the front page of the International Herald Tribune. Later he testified about his experience at the post-apartheid Truth and Reconciliation Commission.

== Early career in journalism: 1986–2010 ==
Sole entered journalism full-time in 1986. He worked at Noseweek and at the Sunday Tribune in Durban, where he was political editor. During the post-apartheid transition of the 1990s, he wrote about third force political violence and the apartheid state's chemical warfare programme. He also served a term as president of the South African Union of Journalists.

In 2002 Sole joined the Mail & Guardian (M&G) as an investigative journalist. M&G editor Howard Barrell later said that he recruited Sole and his colleague Stefaans Brümmer through "wooing and waiting". At the newspaper, Sole launched a series of award-winning investigations into political corruption in South Africa, often writing with Brümmer.

== AmaBhungane: 2010–present ==
In 2010, Sole and Brümmer launched the M&G Centre for Investigative Journalism, branded as amaBhungane; a spin-off of the M&G's existing investigative unit, it was a semi-autonomous non-profit organisation for investigative journalism. The model for the centre was inspired by the non-profit Bureau of Investigative Journalism and ProPublica, and in its first fiscal year it received two-thirds of its funding from M&G and the other third from the Open Society Foundation. Before launching it grew from three staff members – Sole, Brümmer, and Adriaan Basson – to five. The centre published its first article in the M&G on 19 March 2010 under the title "Zuma Inc.", a mapping of the business interests of individuals close to the recently elected President of South Africa, Jacob Zuma.

In April 2016, amaBhungane became an entirely independent organisation, terminating its exclusivity agreement with the M&G. Initially serving as managing director alongside Brümmer, Sole became the centre's sole managing director in 2021 when Brümmer stepped down. He is also a member of the International Consortium of Investigative Journalists.

== Notable investigations and awards ==
On 29 November 2002, still in his first year at the M&G, Sole broke the story of an ongoing criminal investigation into Deputy President Jacob Zuma, who was suspected of soliciting bribes from contractors in the 1999 Arms Deal. For that story Sole won the inaugural Vodacom Journalist of the Year Award of 2002.

The next year, Sole and Brümmer's investigations into Oilgate and the Oil-for-Food Programme won them the 2003 Mondi Shanduka Newspaper Award for investigative journalism. For further reporting on the same subject in 2005, with Wisani wa ka Ngobeni as third co-author, they won the same Mondi Shanduka award, the Media Institute of Southern Africa's John Manyarara Investigative Journalism Award, and (shared with Bruce Cameron) the Vodacom Journalist of the Year Award.

For reporting on Jackie Selebi's ties to Brett Kebble, published in 2006 and 2007, Sole, Brümmer, and colleagues won the 2006 Mondi Shanduka Newspaper Award for investigative journalism, as well as the Mondi Shanduka South African Story of the Year Award in both 2006 and 2007. They were the joint runners-up for the Taco Kuiper Award for Investigative Journalism in both years.

Shortly thereafter Sole received the 2008 Taco Kuiper Award jointly with Brümmer and Adriaan Basson for further exposés of corruption in the Arms Deal; they were also finalists for the Mondi Shanduka investigative journalism award that year.

AmaBhungane's first exposé, "Zuma Inc.", won the 2010 Mondi Shanduka South African Story of the Year. Sole was also the joint winner of the 2010 Vodacom Journalist of the Year Award for best feature for amaBhungane's series on Radovan Krejčir, written by Sole, Brümmer, and Ilham Rawoot.

He, Brümmer, and amaBhungane's Vinayak Bhardwaj won the 2013 Taco Kuiper Award for their investigation into state-sponsored upgrades at President Zuma's Nkandla residence.

During the second term of Zuma's presidency, Sole and amaBhungane investigated state capture by the Gupta brothers and other Zuma allies. Notably, in 2017 Daily Maverick editor Branko Brkic recruited amaBhungane, and later News24, for a joint investigation of the so-called Gupta Leaks. Members of the three investigative units, including Sole, were the joint winners of several journalism awards for that investigation, including the 2017 Taco Kuiper Award, the 2017 Standard Bank Sikuvile Award for investigative journalism, and the 2019 Global Shining Light Award. Sole was also shortlisted separately for the 2017 Taco Kuiper Award for reporting with Susan Comrie on the involvement of McKinsey & Company in Gupta-linked public contracts.

In later years Sole collaborated with a rotation of amaBhungane members. Sole and Comrie were the joint winners of the Vodacom Journalist of the Year Award in the finance and economics category in both 2020 and 2021. Sole, Dewald van Rensburg, and Micah Reddy won the 2022 Sanlam Award for Excellence in Financial Journalism in the business and companies category, and the same trio were the joint runners-up for the 2023 Taco Kuiper Award for their reporting on Zunaid Moti's business dealings. The Editors' Forum of Namibia Journalism Awards awarded its 2023 Journalist of the Year Award in the environment category to Sole and The Namibian's Timo Shihepo, with whom Sole had investigated the oil exploration activities of ReconAfrica.

== Surveillance ==
In 2015 Sole learned from court records, filed in litigation about the spy tapes in Zuma's corruption trial, that the National Intelligence Agency (later the State Security Agency) had intercepted a 2008 phone call between him and a source, prosecutor Billy Downer. In response to a Promotion of Access to Information Act request, the State Security Agency disclosed that it had obtained a warrant to tap Sole's phone under the Regulation of Interception of Communications and Provision of Communication-Related Information Act (RICA). The disclosure confirmed longstanding suspicions; in 2009 the M&G had lodged an ineffectual complaint with the Inspector-General of Intelligence in connection with reliable reports that Sole and his colleagues, including M&G editor Ferial Haffajee, appeared on the spy tapes.

Right2Know used Sole's case as a case study of state surveillance of journalists in South Africa. Meanwhile, on the basis of the State Security Agency's disclosure, Sole and amaBhungane mounted a challenge to the constitutionality of RICA and of bulk surveillance conducted under its auspices. The Constitutional Court of South Africa ruled in their favour on 4 February 2021. In 2022 Zuma used the tapes to lodge criminal charges against Downer, alleging that they showed that Downer had perpetrated an unlawful leak to Sole in 2008 (as well as to legal journalist Karyn Maughan more recently).

== Personal life ==
Sole is married and has two daughters.
