= Taco Kuiper =

South African journalist (1941–2004)

Taco Esgo Kuiper (11 November 1941 – 24 September 2004) was an investigative journalist and wealthy publisher in South Africa. He was the owner and publishing editor of The Investors’ Guide in Johannesburg, for undertaking and encouraging investigative journalism in South Africa, and for funding the annual Taco Kuiper Award in investigative journalism.

== Biography ==
Taco Kuiper was born on 11 November 1941, in Batavia, Dutch East Indies (now Indonesia) in 1941 to Dutch parents, and spent the Second World War in a Japanese internment camp. After the war, his family returned to the Netherlands. In the early 1960s, they sent him to Johannesburg, South Africa to work for Barclays Bank, later moving to South Africa and starting his own investment statistical service from a small flat in Hillbrow. Eventually he made his fortune as owner and publishing editor of the successful The Investor's Guide in Johannesburg, in which he reported on malfeasance and white-collar crime in Johannesburg financial circles, as well as on the financial and other negative impacts that apartheid had on South African black communities.

Kuiper died 24 September 2004, in Johannesburg. The mourners were asked to sign a register of attendance. Some 92 people did, the others declined. It turned out that he had stipulated in his will that everyone who signed would share in a special legacy of R1 million, giving around R11,000 to each of the people who were not shy to be associated with Kuiper.

== Taco Kuiper Awards ==
The Taco Kuiper Fund encourages and rewards investigative journalism in South Africa through the Taco Kuiper Awards for Investigative Journalism. The Fund and the Valley Trust were created by Taco Kuiper shortly before his death. The Wits Journalism Programme now partners with The Valley Trust to administer the Taco Kuiper Fund and Award.

=== Taco Kuiper Award Winners ===
==== 2006 ====
Adriaan Basson and Carien du Plessis, journalists, for their series of articles investigating corruption at the Department of Correctional Services in Die Beeld and Die Burger newspapers.

Runners up

- Zukile Majova, Stephen Patrick, Sam Sole, Nicholas Dawes and Stefaans Brümmer, journalists for Mail and Guardian, for their articles on the Jackie Selebi and Brett Kebble investigation.
- Fred Kockott and Sibusiso Ngalwa, journalists from Sunday Tribune, for their article on the abuse of the national Nguni cattle herd by the Ithala Finance Development Corporation in KwaZulu-Natal province.

==== 2007 ====
Brett Horner, Chandre Prince and Ntando Makhubu, journalists from the Daily Dispatch, for their expose of neo-natal deaths in the Frere Hospital in the Eastern Cape.

Runners up

- Stefaans Brümmer, Stephen Sole, Zukile Majova, Nic Dawes, Adriaan Basson and Pearlie Joubert, journalist team for the Mail and Guardian, for their articles on the scandals of former South African police commissioner, Jackie Selebi.

==== 2008 ====
Sam Sole, Stefaans Brümmer and Adriaan Basson, journalists from the Mail and Guardian, for their series of articles "Smokes, sex and the arms deal" about Zimbabwean businessman John Bredenkamp.

Runners up

- Carte Blanche producers Nicola de Chaud and Odette Schwegier, and Devi Sankaree Govender, presenter, for their programme "Police Corruption in Hammanskraal".
- Dumisane Lubisi and Jacky Mapiloko, journalists at City Press, for their articles on tender corruption in Soweto's hospital.

==== 2009 ====
Rob Rose from the Financial Mail/Sunday Times, for his series of articles on Barry Tannenbaum and his swindling of some of South Africa's wealthiest businessmen and investors.
