= Nandipha =

Nandipha is a gender-neutral given name found in South Africa. Notable people with this name include:

- Nandipha Magudumana (born 1989), a South African celebrity doctor
- Nandipha Mntambo (born 1982), a South African artist
