= Sisanda Nkoala =

Sisanda Nkoala is a South African media scholar and former radio journalist. She is an associate professor at the University of the Western Cape, her research focuses on journalism and media. She worked mainly in radio journalism. Later, she moved into higher education. Her reporting included work for SABC Radio News. Nkoala has served as a public representative on the Press Council of South Africa. She has also been involved with the South African National Editors' Forum.

== Awards ==
She won the Western Cape Radio Feature category in 2015 at the Vodacom Journalist of the Year awards. Her work included reports on missing children and the Rhodes Must Fall movement.

Nkoala received a Digital Humanities Award from the National Institute for the Humanities and Social Sciences. She received the Research Excellence Award for emerging Researchers from the National Research Foundation in 2024. She was also first runner-up in the Distinguished Young Women Researchers in Humanities and Social Sciences category at the South African Women in Science Awards.

== Career ==
Nkoala worked as a radio journalist before moving into academia. She reported for the SABC. Nkoala later moved into journalism education and research. She holds a PhD in rhetoric studies from the University of Cape Town. She later joined the University of the Western Cape. Her research covers journalism, rhetoric, multilingualism and digital media. She has studied indigenous-language podcasts in South Africa and the use of rhetoric in television news. She has also written about journalism education and its relationship with the media industry in Africa.
