= GroundUp (news agency) =

South African NPO news agency

- South African news that matters
- Logo used since 2016
- Type: Daily newspaper
- Format: Online newspaper
- Editor: Nathan Geffen
- Deputy editor: Barbara October
- Associate editor: Alide Dasnois; Brent Meersman
- Founded: 2012
- Language: English
- Headquarters: Cape Town, South Africa
- Country: South Africa
- Website: www.groundup.org.za

GroundUp is a South African-based not-for-profit news agency. It publishes most content related to education, health, sanitation, immigration and human rights stories under a creative commons license and is known for its focus on public interest stories within vulnerable communities with a "bottom-up" style of reporting. Their content is regularly reprinted and featured in other South African news publications such as the Daily Maverick, News24, and Mail & Guardian.

== History ==
GroundUp started in April 2012 as a joint project of Community Media Trust and the University of Cape Town's Centre for Social Science Research by Nathan Geffen, a computer scientist, researcher and former Treatment Action Campaign member.

== Reporting ==
The publication is known for exposing corruption within the South African National Lottery scheme. For this investigation, GroundUp editor Nathan Geffen and journalist Raymond Joseph were joint winners of the 2021 South African National Editors' Forum (SANEF) Nat Nakasa award for courageous community journalism. Joseph went on to win the Vodacom Journalist of the Year and Taco Kuiper awards.

In 2023, GroundUp reporters Marecia Damons and Daniel Steyn investigated and exposed the prison escape of convicted rapist Thabo Bester, for which they were received the Nat Nakasa Award for Media Integrity and the Vodacom Journalist of the Year Award in 2023.
