= William West Jones =

British-born Anglican bishop (1838–1908)

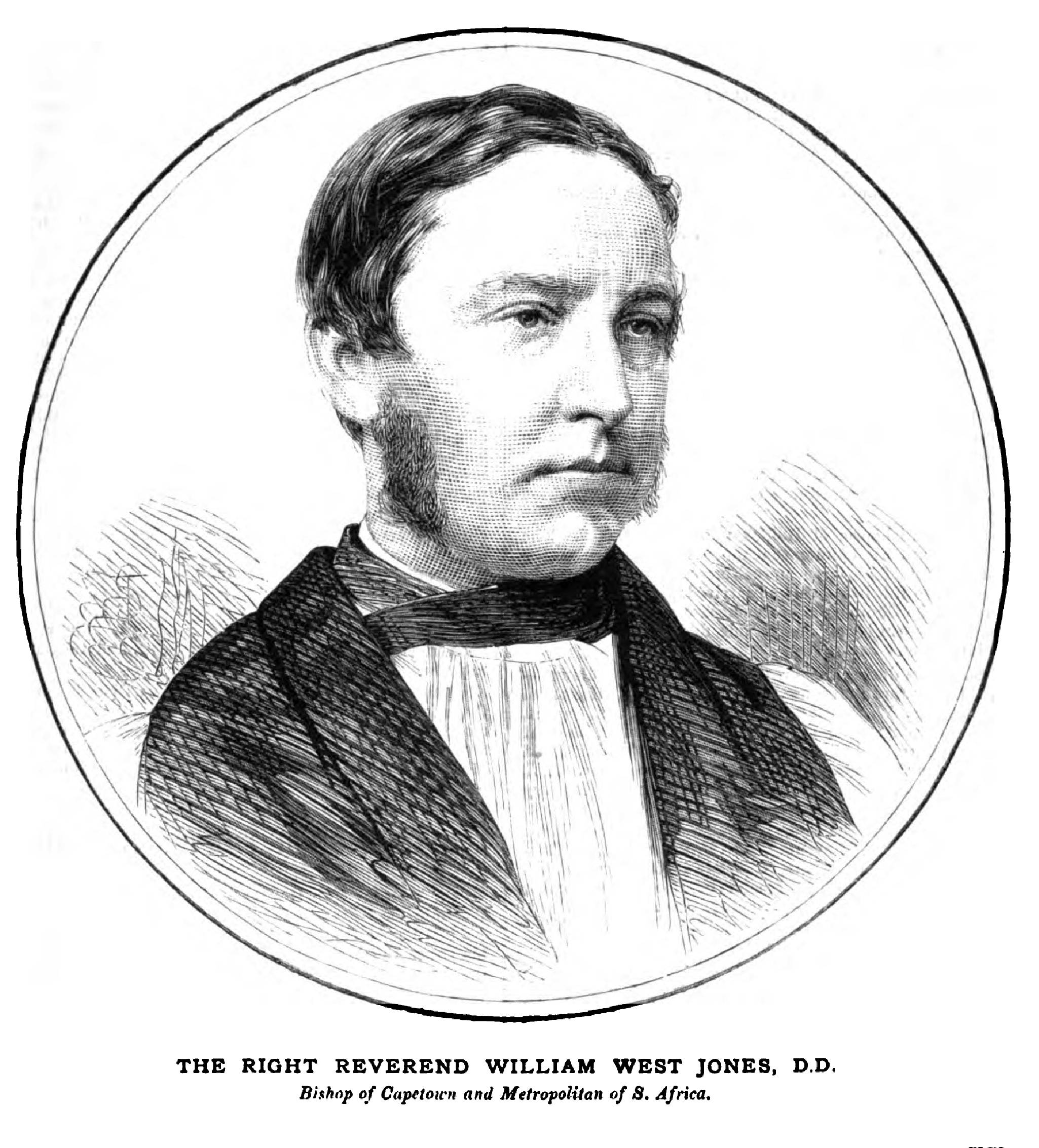
William West Jones from Church Bells (1875)

William West Jones (11 May 1838 – 21 May 1908) was the second Bishop and first Archbishop of Cape Town.

== Biography ==
Jones was born in South Hackney, London, the son of Edward Henry Jones, wine merchant of Mark Lane, London, and his wife, Mary Emma Collier.

He was educated at Merchant Taylors’ School (1845–1856), and at St John's College, Oxford (matriculated, 30 June 1856; Foundation Scholar; second class, moderations, 1858; Fellow, 1859–1879; honorary fourth class, literae humaniores and mathematics, and BA, 1860; MA, 1863 [Crockford's] or 1864 [Foster]; BD, 1869; DD, honoris causa, 12 May 1874; honorary Fellow, 1893).

He was ordained Deacon on Michaelmas Day, 29 September 1861, and Priest on St. Matthew's Day, 21 September 1862, by the Bishop of Oxford. Between 1861 and 1864 he served as Assistant Curate of St. Matthew's Church, City Road, in the city and diocese of London. He returned to Oxford in 1864 to take up the appointment of Dean of Arts of St. John's College, and Vicar of the parish of Summertown. In 1871 he was appointed Diocesan Inspector of Schools and Rural Dean of Oxford. He became Vice-President of St. John's College in 1872.

He was chosen as second Bishop of Cape Town and ipso facto Metropolitan of the Church of the Province of South Africa, and consecrated as such in Westminster Abbey on 17 May 1874 by the Archbishop of Canterbury, assisted by the Bishops of London, Winchester, Oxford, Ely, Edinburgh, and Goulburn, and Bishop Claughton. He arrived in Table Bay aboard the Anglian on 31 August, and was enthroned by the Dean of Cape Town, the Very Revd. C. W. Barnett Clarke on 26 November 1874.

He attended the Lambeth Conferences of 1878, 1888, and 1897 and adopted the additional title of Archbishop of Cape Town on 28 July 1897, after the Lambeth Conference had resolved to entitle certain of the Metropolitans of the Anglican communion as Archbishops.

He returned to England to attend the Pan-Anglican Congress and Lambeth Conference in 1908, and died in Housel Bay in Cornwall, on 21 May 1908. He was buried in Oxford.

Jones was married in St. Peter's Church, Eaton Square in London, by the Bishop of Ely, on 16 January 1879, to Emily Frances Allen, the daughter of John Allen, of Oldfield Hall, Altrincham. Mrs. Jones died on 9 November 1930.

West Jones “won a great reputation for pastoral gentleness, generosity and kindliness. His simplicity of character, courtesy, business aptitude and commanding presence gained the friendship of all who had dealings with him” (Dictionary of South African Biography).

== Bibliography ==
- Foster, Joseph (1887). Alumni Oxonienses (volumes I and II).
- Who's Who. 1908.
- Whitaker's Peerage for the Year 1901.
- Crockford's Clerical Directory. 1905.
- Lee, Sidney, ed. (1912). "Jones, William West" . Dictionary of National Biography (2nd supplement). London: Smith, Elder & Co.
- Wood, M. H. M. (1913). A Father in God.
- The Pilot. January 1931.
- G. E. Edwards, and C Lewis (1934). Historical Records of the Church of the Province of South Africa. Cape Town.
- De Kock, W. J. (editor-in-chief) (1968). Dictionary of South African Biography (volume 1). Cape Town: Nasionale Boekhandel.
- Langham-Carter, R. R. (1977). Old St. George's.
- De Villiers, A. W. (1998). Messengers, Watchmen and Stewards, a biographical register of clergymen licensed, ordained for service, or otherwise active, in the Anglican diocese of Cape Town prior to the death of Archbishop William West Jones on 21 May 1908. Johannesburg: Historical Papers, The Library, University of the Witwatersrand.
