= Mass surveillance in South Africa =

Overview of mass surveillance in the Republic of South Africa

In 2019, it was reported that the Republic of South Africa had admitted that it been performing mass surveillance on Internet traffic by intercepting signals on submarine cables since 2008. The information emerged from a government affidavit in a legal case filed by the civil rights group amaBhungane that had challenged the Regulation of Interception of Communications Act of 2002 and the National Security Act of 1994.
