= AmaBhungane =

Investigative journalism organisation

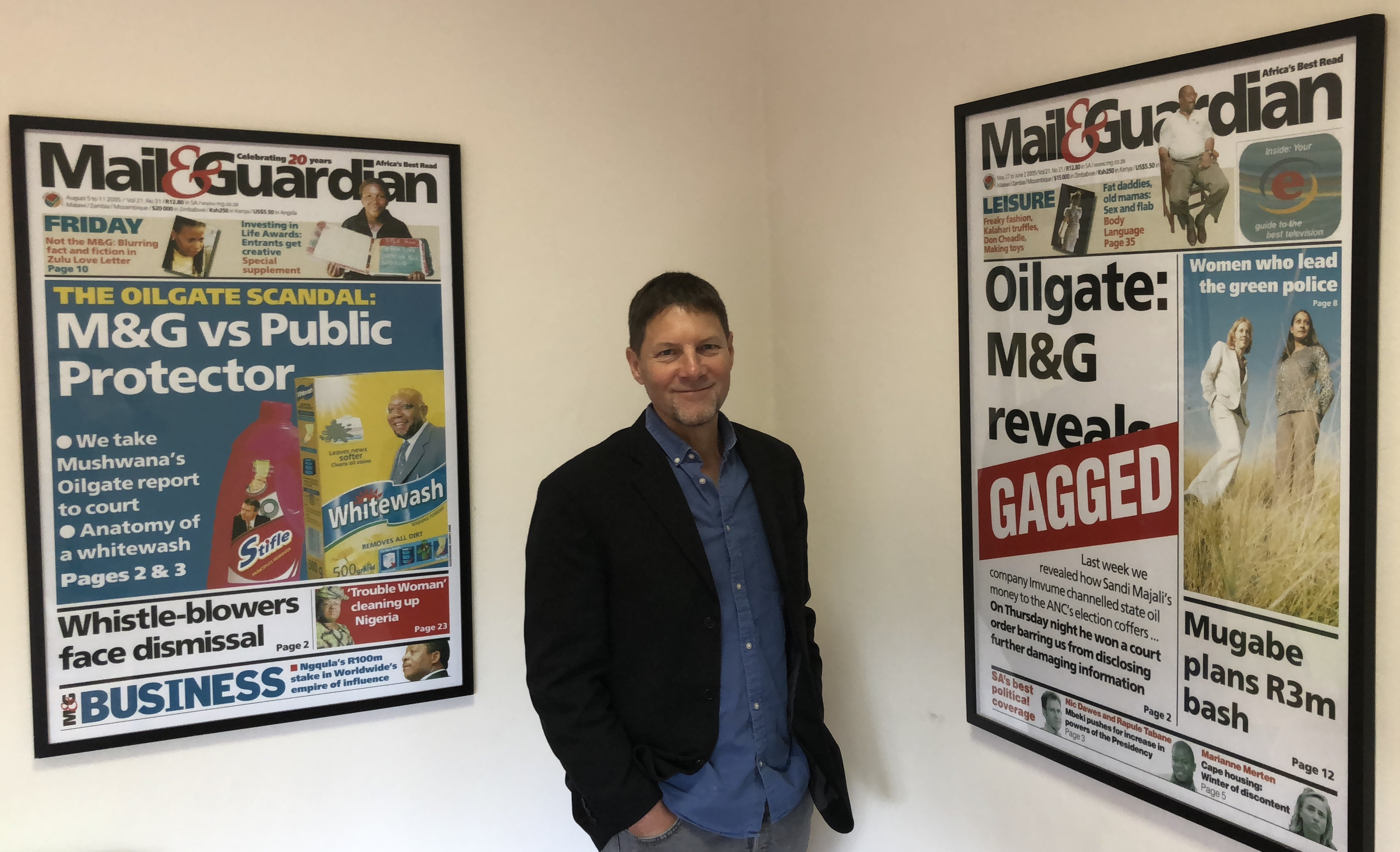
- Motto: Digging dung, fertilising democracy
- Established: 2010 (15 years ago)
- Founders: Sam Sole, Stefaans Brümmer
- Types: nonprofit organization
- Country: South Africa
- Budget: R9.7 million
- Website: amabhungane.org

AmaBhungane Centre for Investigative Journalism is an investigative journalism organisation focusing primarily on exposing political corruption in South Africa and neighbouring countries. They say that their name means “dung beetles” in isiZulu, one of the indigenous languages of South Africa. They claim they are “digging dung, fertilising democracy.”

Their “#GuptaLeaks” investigations have produced many stories over the years that exposed substantive political corruption in the South African government, recognised by several prestigious awards for investigative journalism. These reports suggested that the Gupta family had ”captured the state” through their friendship with then-President Jacob Zuma and seem to have contributed to 2016 electoral defeats by the ANC in South Africa's largest cities, the defeat of Zuma as president of the African National Congress on 18 December 2017, and then to Zuma's resignation as head of state on 14 February 2018. They've also contributed to the Paradise Papers exposé and many other reports relating to the South African political economy.

== Controversies ==
In 2012 the founder and managing partner of amaBhungane, Sam Sole, was named in a document of the private intelligence firm Stratfor as one of their sources in South Africa. The spreadsheet was leaked as part of the Wikileaks Global Intelligence Files. Sole never publicly commented on the leak but his editor Nic Dawes, who was also named as having met Stratfor analyst Mark Schroeder, denied that the newspaper Mail and Guardian had 'made a deal' with Stratfor and that Sole "met Mr Schroeder briefly at a public debate in Pietermaritzburg July 2008 and has had no further contact with him".

== Budget ==
Their budget for two representative years is summarised in the following table.

budget for typical years
year	Rand (millions)	US$ (millions)	US$ per capita
2020	9.7	0.59	0.01
2016	7.4	0.56	0.01

== Board members ==
As of 2022 the non-executive board members of amaBhungane were Tawana Kupe, Sithembile Mbete, Sisonke Msimang, Angela Quintal and Nicholas Dawes.

== Awards ==
The following include only a few of the awards presented to amaBhungane and members of their team:

- 19 March 2018: “19 journalists from AmaBhungane, the Daily Maverick and News24, won the 2017 Taco Kuiper Award for their excellent investigative journalism into the Gupta email leaks, also known as the #GuptaLeaks.” Taco Kuiper is reportedly South Africa's biggest investigative journalism award.
- 16 November 2017: AmaBhungane shared the 2017 Vodacom Journalist of the Year Award in the financial / economic category with the Daily Maverick and News24 for the #GuptaLeaks series.
- 28 June 2017: Susan Comrie and Craig McKune, investigators from AmaBhungane, won the 2016 Sanlam Financial Journalist of the Year and Online Financial Journalist of the Year awards, respectively.

== See also ==
- Mass surveillance in South Africa
