= Ina Bonette =

South African rape survivor

Ina Bonnette
- Occupation: Advocate for victims of gender-based violence
- Known for: Survivor of the Modimolle attack
- Children: Conrad Bonnette (deceased; 2012)

Ina Bonnette is a South African rape survivor who became widely known following her former husband Johan Kotze's brutal attack. Her experience involved a three-hour period of torture, mutilation, and the murder of her son, Conrad Bonnette by Kotzé on 3 January 2012. This shocked the nation and drew attention to the pervasive issue of violence against women in South Africa.

Ina Bonnette was in a relationship with Kotze and lived together in the town of Modimolle, in Limpopo from October 2010 to 2011, when they broke up and lived separately.

In January 2012, Kotze along with his three workers and accomplices - Andries Sithole, Pieta Mohlane and Frans Mphaka, orchestrated a brutal attack on her. She was tortured by driving nails into her breasts and pinching her with pliers, all while professing his love for her. He then instructed the three men to rape her. Kotze then shot her son, Conrad. Kotze was eventually arrested, along with his accomplices, and sentenced to two life sentences and an additional 25-year sentence.

In October 2021, Bonnette published a book titled Ina, ’n Verhaal van Genade en Genesing ("Ina: A Tale of Mercy and Healing",), which chronicled her traumatic experience, the abuse she endured, and her path toward healing.

Bonnette continues to live in Modimolle, near the house where the attack occurred.

== Aftermath and healing ==
The emotional and physical scars left by Kotze’s actions took a significant toll on Bonnette. She underwent 20 surgical operations.

Bonnette noted that writing Ina, ’n Verhaal van Genade en Genesing was part of her recovery process.

== See also ==
- Gender-based violence
- Domestic abuse
- Crime in South Africa
