= Elias Xitavhudzi =

South African serial killer

- Born: Union of South Africa
- Other name: Pangaman
- Conviction: Murder (16 counts)
- Penalty: Death

Details
- Victims: 16
- Country: Union of South Africa

Elias Xitavhudzi was a South African serial killer who murdered 16 women in Atteridgeville, South Africa, in the 1960s. Xitavhudzi, who was black, targeted only whites in the then-strictly segregated community. His killing spree caused a local sensation during the peak years of South Africa's apartheid regime. Prior to his capture, he acquired the nickname "Pangaman" (panga being a local word for the machete with which he mutilated his victims).

After his arrest, he was tried and sentenced to death. He was the second in a series of at least a half-dozen serial killers to have plagued the township of Atteridgeville.

== See also ==
- Daisy de Melker
- Elifasi Msomi
- Moses Sithole
- List of serial killers in South Africa
