= Max du Plessis =

South African barrister and academic

Max du Plessis SC
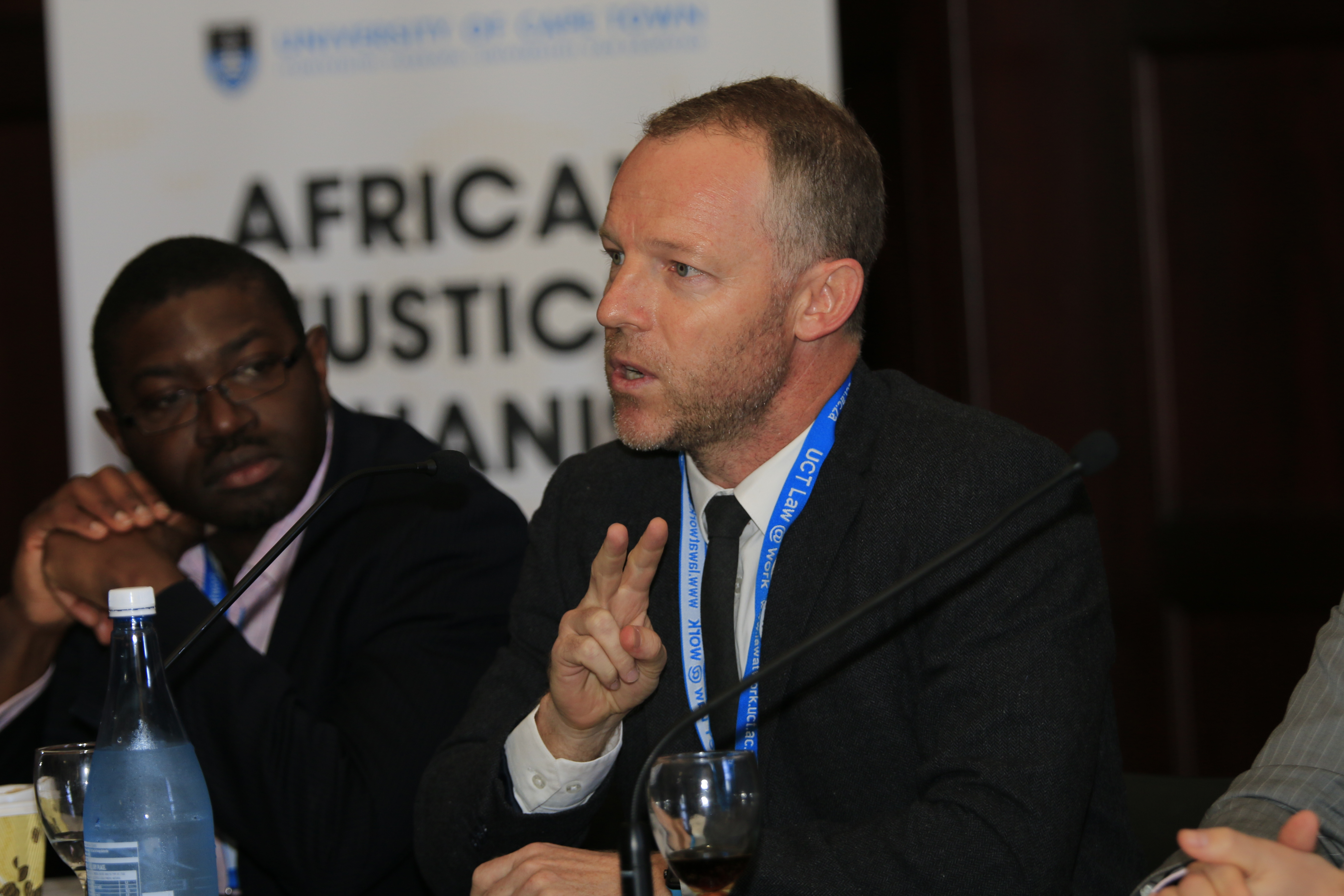
- Du Plessis at a 2016 University of Cape Town symposium
- Education: University of South Africa B.luris; University of Natal LLB; University of Cambridge LLM; University of KwaZulu-Natal PhD
- Children: 3

Max du Plessis SC is a South African barrister and academic. He specialises in international, administrative and constitutional law and has worked South Africa and England. His practice is based in Durban.

== Early life and education ==
Du Plessis completed Bachelor of Laws (B.luris and LLB) at the University of South Africa and University of Natal respectively. He went on to graduate with a Master of Laws (LLM) from the University of Cambridge and pursue PhD studies at the University of KwaZulu-Natal. He became a senior research fellow in the International Crime in Africa Programme at the Institute for Security Studies.

== Career ==
Du Plessis has been practicing since 2000. He became an advocate at the High Court of South Africa. In 2007, du Plessis was a visiting expert on the International Criminal Court.

Currently, du Plessis is an adjunct professor at the University of Cape Town and Nelson Mandela University. He was an associate professor at the University of KwaZulu-Natal, where he taught a masters course on Current Legal Issues: The Politics of Law, and where he is still a research fellow. Du Plessis has also been a visiting professor at Oxford University, Cambridge University, Harvard Kennedy School, the London School of Economics, the University of Sydney, and New York Law School.

Du Plessis joined the KwaZulu-Natal Bar, receiving his silk in 2018. He is a member of Ubunye Chambers, a group of advocates in Umhlanga, and as of 2024, a full tenant at Doughty Street Chambers in London, where he is a member of Lincoln's Inn. In addition, du Plessis is an associate tenant at Thulamela Chambers in Johannesburg. He was also an associate fellow in international law at Chatham House.

== Notable cases ==
Anton Katz and Max du Plessis represented Australian professor Kenneth Good upon his expulsion from Botswana for criticising the government in the 2010 Good vs Botswana case at the African Commission on Human and Peoples' Rights (ACHPR), who ruled in Good's favour.

Du Plessis acted as Lead Counsel on behalf of Mozambique's Forum for Monitoring the Budget (FMO) in the Tuna Fishing Boats Affair regarding former finance minister Manuel Chang's extradition to the United States. In 2022 and 2023, du Plessis, on behalf of the Campaign for Free Expression, argued in court that former President Jacob Zuma's attempts to prosecute journalist Karyn Maughan amounted to a SLAPP lawsuit.

In 2023, du Plessis acted for South Africa's opposition party the Democratic Alliance (DA) to secure a declaratory order from the country's High Court that Russian President Vladimir Putin would be arrested if he arrived in South Africa for the BRICS Summit.

In January 2024, du Plessis appeared in the Hague as a member of the legal team representing South Africa's proceedings accusing Israel of genocide at the International Court of Justice (ICJ).

In 2025, Du Plessis was appointed by the United Nations Human Rights Council (UNHRC) to replace Shaheen Sardar Ali as independent member of the Fact-Finding Mission on the Islamic Republic of Iran, investigating alleged human rights violations in the September 2022 protests.

== Personal life ==
Du Plessis lives in Ballito with his spouse Jo and their three children: two daughters and a son.

== Select bibliography ==
=== Books ===
- Race, Religion and Ethnicity Discrimination: Using International Human Rights Law (2003), with Karen Monaghan and Tajinder Malhi
- Repairing the Past?: International Perspectives on Reparations for Gross Human Rights Abuses (2007), editor with Stephen Peté
- African Guide to International Criminal Law (2008)
- Unable or Unwilling?: Case Studies on Domestic Implementation of the ICC Statute in Selected African Countries (2008), with Jolyon Ford
- The International Criminal Court that Africa Wants (2010)
- Civil Procedure – A Practical Guide (2nd Edition) (2011), editor with Stephen Pete, Robin Palmer and David Hulme
- Constitutional Litigation (2013), with Glenn Penfold and Jason Brickhill
- Law, Nation-Building & Transformation: The South African experience in perspective (2014), editor with Catherine Jenkins
- Class Action Litigation in South Africa (2017), editor with various

=== Chapters and articles ===
- "International criminal law : the crime of apartheid revisited : recent cases" in South African Journal of Criminal Justice (2011)
- "A new Regional International Criminal Court for Africa?" in South African Journal of Criminal Justice (2012)
- "Sentencing – select cases" in Annotated Leading Cases of International Criminal Tribunals (2012), with Chris Gevers, edited by Andre Klip and Goran Sluiter
- "Israel through the prism of international law" in Pretending democracy: Israel, an ethnocratic state (2012), for the Afro-Middle East Centre
- "South Africa's Implementation of the Rome Statute" in Power and Prosecution – Challenges and Opportunities for International Criminal Justice in Sub-Saharan Africa (2012), by Kai Ambos and Ottilia Maundanigze
- "The African Union and the ICC: Milestones in International Criminal Justice" (2013) for Chatham House, with Tiya Maluwa and Annie O'Reilly
- "Behind the Mask of the Rainbow Nation – the Limits of Law in Post-Apartheid South Africa" in Law, nation-building and Transformation: The South African Experience in Perspective (2014), with Stephen Pete, edited by himself and Jenkins
- "The Urgings of a Friendly Founding Father" in Law, Politics and Rights: Essays in memory of Kader Asmal (2014), edited by Tiyanjana Maluwa
