= Moses Sithole =

South African serial killer (born 1964)

- Born: 17 November 1964 (age 61); Vosloorus, Gauteng, South Africa
- Other names: The ABC Killer; The South African Strangler; The Gauteng Killer
- Convictions: Murder; Rape; Robbery
- Penalty: 2,410 years' imprisonment

Details
- Victims: 38–76
- Span of crimes: 1994–1995
- Country: South Africa
- States: Atteridgeville, Gauteng, Johannesburg
- Date apprehended: 6 November 1995
- Imprisoned at: Mangaung Correctional Centre

Moses Sithole (born 17 November 1964) is a South African serial killer and rapist who committed the ABC Murders in South Africa. It is believed that he is so named because they began in Atteridgeville, continued in Boksburg and finished in Cleveland, a suburb of Johannesburg. However, many other sources state the cities were not in that order, rather beginning in Cleveland, continuing in Boksburg, and finishing in Atteridgeville. This has neither been confirmed nor denied.

Sithole murdered at least 37 women and one toddler between 16 July 1994 and 6 November 1995. Sithole was sentenced to 2,410 years imprisonment and is currently incarcerated in Mangaung Correctional Centre in Bloemfontein.

== Early life ==
Moses Sithole was born on 17 November 1964 in Vosloorus, a township near Alberton, Transvaal Province (now Gauteng). When he was five years old, his father died and his mother abandoned the family. Sithole and his siblings spent the next three years in an orphanage, where he later said they were mistreated. By his own account, Sithole was arrested for rape in his teens and spent seven years in prison. He later blamed his imprisonment for turning him into a murderer. He explained his crimes by saying that the women he murdered all reminded him of the women who had falsely accused him of rape years before.

== Murders ==
Sithole appeared to be a mild-mannered individual to those around him. At the time of his crimes, he was managing a shell organisation, Youth Against Human Abuse, ostensibly devoted to the eradication of child abuse. After committing murders in Atteridgeville, near Pretoria, Sithole moved his focus to Boksburg and eventually to Cleveland. By 1995, he had claimed over thirty victims, sparking nationwide panic. In some cases, he would later phone the victims' families for no other apparent reason than to taunt them. At one point, President Nelson Mandela visited Boksburg in person to appeal for public assistance in apprehending the killer.

Most of his victims were being interviewed for positions with Sithole's ersatz charity. Sithole would take them to remote fields, where he would beat, rape, and murder them. They were generally strangled with their underwear. He once inflicted a head wound on the two-year-old son of one of his victims and left him to die from exposure.

== Capture ==
In August 1995, Sithole was identified as having been seen with one of the victims, but he disappeared shortly after SAPS investigators learned details of his previous rape conviction. In October 1995, Sithole contacted South African journalist Tamsen de Beer who was working for The Star newspaper and identified himself as the wanted murderer. During a phone conversation with de Beer, he said that the killings were carried out in revenge for his unjust imprisonment and claimed 76 victims, twice as many as those reported. Finally, to prove his identity, Sithole gave directions to where one of the bodies had been left. Local authorities subsequently cornered Sithole in Johannesburg, shooting the suspect when he attacked a constable with a hatchet. Sithole was driven to the hospital, where he was found to be HIV positive and also tested positive for TB.

== Trial and imprisonment ==
During his trial, another reporter from The Star, Mandla Mthembu, was subpoenaed as a witness against Sithole at the Pretoria High Court. Mthembu had previously written about Sithole before his crimes were exposed. Mthembu additionally claims that Sithole had also reached-out to him in 1995 to confess to additional murderers before he was arrested. He had asked Mthembu to arrange a meeting with the police so that he can hand himself over.

On 5 December 1997, Sithole was sentenced to 50 years' imprisonment for each of the 38 murders, twelve years' imprisonment for each of the 40 rapes, and five years' imprisonment for each of six robberies. Since his sentences run consecutively, his total effective sentence is 2,410 years.

Justice David Curlewis ordered that Sithole would be required to serve at least 930 years before being eligible for parole, making him eligible for parole at the age of 963. The judge also told Sithole that if capital punishment were still used, he would have been sentenced to death. Sithole was incarcerated in C-Max, the maximum security section of Pretoria Central Prison. He is currently incarcerated in Mangaung Correctional Centre in Bloemfontein.

== Victims ==
Full list of Sithole's victims

Number	Name	Sex	Age	Date of Murder	Notes
1	Marina Monene Monama	F	18	16 July 1994	Disappeared on July 6, 1994 and body discovered on July 16, 1994.
2	Amanda Kebofile Thethe	F	26	6 August 1994	In a relationship with Sithole at the time
3	Joyce Thakane Mashabela	F	32	19 August 1994	Body discovered on August 19, 1994, in Pretoria West, Pretoria
4	Refiloe Amanda Mokale	F	24	7 September 1994	
5	Rose Rebothile Mogotsi	F	22	18 September 1994	
6	Unidentified victim	F	Unknown	December 1994	Discovered on 3 January 1995
7	Beauty Nuku Soko	F	27	January 1995	
8	Sara Matlakala Mokono	F	25	3 March 1995	
9	Nikiwe Diko	F	24	7 April 1995	Was raped with a stick; discovered 24 June
10	Letta Nomthandazo Ndlangamandla	F	25	12 April 1995	
11	Sibusiso Nomthandazo Ndlangamandla	M	2	20 April 1995	Letta's son; incidental; injured in the head and died from exposure
12	Esther Moshibudi Mainetja	F	29	12 May 1995	
13	Granny Dimakatso Ramela	F	21	23 May 1995	Discovered 18 July
14	Elizabeth Granny Mathetsa	F	19	25 May 1995	Discovered 16 June
15	Mildred Ntiya Lepule	F	28	30 May 1995	Discovered 26 July
16	Francina Nomsa Sithebe	F	25	13 June 1995	
17	Ernestina Mohadi Mosebo	F	30	22 June 1995	
18	Elsie Khoti Masango	F	25	14 July 1995	Discovered 8 August
19	Josephine Mantsali Mlangeni	F	25	17 July 1995	
20	Oscarina Vuyokazi Jakalase	F	30	8 August 1995	Discovered 23 August
21	Unidentified victim	F	Unknown	9 August 1995	
22	Makoba Tryphina Mogotsi	F	26	15 August 1995	Discovered 17 September
23	Unidentified victim	F	Unknown	28 August 1995	
24	Unidentified victim	F	Unknown	30 August 1995	
25	Nelisiwe Nontobeko Zulu	F	26	4 September 1995	Discovered 17 September
26	Amelia Dikamakatso Rapodile	F	43	7 September 1995	
27	Unidentified victim	F	Unknown	12 September 1995	
28	Monica Gabisile Vilakazi	F	31	12 September 1995	Discovered 17 September
29	Hazel Nozipho Madikizela	F	21	17 September 1995	
30	Tsidi Malekoae Matela	F	45	17 September 1995	
31	Unidentified victim	F	Unknown	17 September 1995	
32	Unidentified victim	F	Unknown	17 September 1995	
33	Unidentified victim	F	Unknown	17 September 1995	
34	Agnes Sibongile Mbuli	F	20	17 September 1995	Discovered 3 October
35	Unidentified victim	F	Unknown	9 October 1995	
36	Beauty Ntombi Ndabeni	F	Unknown	10 October 1995	Discovered 11 October
37	Unidentified victim	F	Unknown	14 October 1995	
38	Unidentified victim	F	Unknown	6 November 1995	

== See also ==
- Elias Xitavhudzi (serial killer in Atteridgeville)
- List of serial killers in South Africa
- List of serial killers by number of victims
