= Alide Dasnois =

South African journalist and newspaper editor (born 1950)

- Born: 1950 (age 75–76)
- Citizenship: South Africa
- Education: University of Cape Town; University of Paris
- Occupations: Journalist, editor
- Awards: Nat Nakasa award

Alide Dasnois (born 1950) is a South African journalist and newspaper editor.

== Education and career ==
Dasnois matriculated from Herschel Girls School and completed a bachelor's degree in economics at the University of Cape Town. She obtained a master's degree at the Sorbonne (Université Paris I – Panthéon Sorbonne) in Development Economics.

During the mid-1980s she worked as a translator in Paris. In 1988, she moved to Reunion Island to work for Témoignages. In 1992, she started working at The Argus in Cape Town where she edited the business section before becoming assistant editor for Personal Finance (Cape Town).

In 2001, she moved to Johannesburg and became the editor of Business Report, before working as acting editor of the Pretoria News for a year in 2006. She worked as deputy editor of the Cape Times from December 2006 until April 2009, when she became first female editor of the Cape Times.

== Controversy ==
Free speech activists protesting against the removal of Dasnois as Cape Times editor

Dasnois was removed from her post as Cape Times editor on the weekend of 6 December 2013, shortly after the acquisition of the Cape Times by Sekunjalo Investments Limited. In response to allegations that her removal was in retaliation for an article in the Cape Times reporting findings by the Public Protector prejudicial to the Sekunjalo Group, the executive chairman Iqbal Surve released a press statement indicating her removal was for "under performance" and failure in her "fiduciary responsibilities".

The removal of Dasnois as editor and related threats of legal action from Sekunjalo have elicited statements of support for her and of concern over editorial independence at the Cape Times from Index on Censorship, the International Federation of Journalists, the SA Centre for PEN International, the SA National Editors Forum, the Freedom of Expression Institute, and the Right2Know Campaign.

Dasnois won the 2014 Nat Nakasa award for courage and integrity in journalism from the SA National Editors' Forum, the Nieman Foundation and Print and Digital Media SA. In their citation, the judges – Joe Thloloe, Peter Sullivan and Simphiwe Sesanti – said she had "demonstrated all the qualities required to win this award, such as bravery, integrity and courage". "This she displayed in her career as the editor of the Cape Times, a position from which she was relieved recently by the owners of the newspaper. The official reason for her removal was that she failed to give coverage to the passing away of former South African president Nelson Mandela. This reason was rejected by many, attributing her bosses' move to her publication of a report – on the same day she was removed – by the Public Protector, Thuli Madonsela, which found the Agriculture, Forestry and Fisheries Minister, Tina Joemat-Petterson, guilty of "improper conduct and maladministration" in an irregular awarding of an R800-million tender to the Sekunjalo Consortium. "Dasnois' supporters pointed out that under her editorship the Cape Times paid tribute to Madiba with a wrap-around edition. The coverage of Madiba's passing was among 15 Mandela covers worldwide especially commended by Time magazine."
