= Tracking Thabo Bester =

South African mini docuseries

- Genre: Docu-series
- Created by: IdeaCandy
- Based on: Thabo Bester; Nandipha Magudumana
- Written by: Nikki Comninos
- Directed by: Nikki Comninos
- Starring: Nkosinathi Sekeleni; Marecia Damons; Daniel Steyn; Ernusta Maralack
- Country of origin: South Africa
- No. of seasons: 1
- No. of episodes: 4

Production
- Producer: IdeaCandy
- Running time: 55–70 minutes

Original release
- Network: Showmax
- Release: 15 March – 22 March 2024

Tracking Thabo Bester is a South African true crime mini television documentary series based on the prison escape of Thabo Bester and his alleged accomplice, Nandipha Magudumana. Produced by IdeaCandy, it was written and directed by Nikki Comninos. It premiered on 15 March 2024 on Showmax.

== Background ==
The documentary racked up the most first day views of any documentary ever on the Showmax streaming platform, and was also the most watched title across all genres over launch weekend. IOL's Oluthando Keteyi calling it "jaw-dropping" and Rapport's Leon van Nierop describing it as "angry, bizarre, brilliant."

While the documentary features many voices, Showmax and broadcasting service Multichoice chose not to interview alleged accomplice Magudumana and Bester for the miniseries. The Department of Correctional Services does not grant interviews with inmates who have not shown rehabilitation. Showmax and Multichoice confirmed they received a letter of demand from Bester and Magudumana a week before broadcast. Bester and Magudumana instructed their legal teams to take actions and launch an application with the Free State High Court ahead of the release of the docu-series. On 9 March 2024 in documents addressed to Showmax and Multichoice, Magudumana requested a full and complete copy of the documentary to verify if there are issues that could detriment her rights, and in the interval, Bester stated that he did not grant any permission to produce, distribute or commercially exploit a documentary or film on his life. It was said that if MultiChoice and Showmax fail to meet the 2pm deadline, an urgent application will be filed at the High Court of South Africa. Under South African law convicted criminals are not allowed to make money from their crimes, and thus it would not be legal for Bester to gain commercially from content related to his breaching of the law through his rapes, murder, fraud and escape.

On 15 March 2024, Judge Stuart Wilson of the Johannesburg High Court dismissed the urgent application laid by the celebrity doctor, and the convicted murderer and Facebook rapist to have the show cancelled, thus giving Showmax and MultiChoice the green light to release the docu-series which later went live on Showmax that day. In his judgement Wilson expounded, all that Bester and Magudumana had shown was “generalised anxiety” that the documentary will talk about them, and that will in some way affect their interests. “Reading the applicants’ papers, I find almost nothing that even rises to conjecture or speculation,” Judge Wilson said, dismissing the applications. “There is no other right in the law to pre-publication approval, where a public figure as Mr Bester arguably is, is the object of a media piece. Prosecutors have an overriding duty to ensure that the trial is fair in all respects,” Wilson said. Speaking to City Press outside court, Steven Budlender, group general counsel at MultiChoice, said they were delighted that the Johannesburg High Court upheld the public's right to watch the Tracking Thabo Bester documentary. The show aired its first two episodes on 15 March 2024 and it aired the remaining episode three and four a week later on 22 March 2024.

== Characters ==
=== Participants ===
- Nkosinathi Sekeleni – Nandipha's brother
- Marecia Damons – GroundUp journalist
- Daniel Steyn – GroundUp journalist
- Ernusta Maralack – section editor, Rapport
- Dr. Simba Chikwava – consulting pathologist
- Nathan Geffen – editor and founder, GroundUp
- Glenda Daniels – associate professor in media studies, Wits University
- Chriselda Lewis – senior journalist and anchor, SABC
- William Shoki – socio-political commentator
- Thandeka Chauke – legal counsellor: citizenship and statelessness
- Dr Gérard Labuschagne – investigative forensic psychologist
- Anele Siswana – clinical psychologist
- Nicole Engelbrecht - True Crime South Africa
- Mathaba Kgalanyane
- Johnny Maponya
- Shalini Indradeo-Calidin

=== Interview archive ===
- Ronald Lamola – Minister of Justice and Correctional Services
- Meisie Mabaso – Bester's mother (EWN and eNCA audio recordings)

=== Cast table ===
List indicators

This section includes characters who have appeared in Tracking Thabo Bester series with main role.

- An empty grey cell indicates the character was not in the season.
- ^{V} indicates a voice-only role.

= Main cast
= Recurring cast
= Guest cast

Cast and crew	Notes	Episodes			
Cast and crew	Notes	1	2	3	4
Nkosinathi Sekeleni	Nandipha's brother	Main			
Marecia Damons	GroundUp journalist	Main	Main	TBA	TBA
Daniel Steyn	GroundUp journalist	Main	Main	TBA	TBA
Ernusta Maralack	Section editor, Rapport		Main	TBA	TBA
William Shoki	Socio-political commentator	Main	Main	TBA	TBA
Dr. Simba Chikwava	Consulting pathologist	Guest	TBA	TBA	TBA
Nathan Geffen	Editor and founder, GroundUp	Guest	TBA	TBA	TBA
Glenda Daniels	Associate professor in media studies, Wits University	Guest	TBA	TBA	TBA
Chriselda Lewis	Senior journalist and anchor, SABC	Guest	TBA	TBA	TBA
Ronald Lamola	Minister of Justice and Correctional Services	Guest	TBA	TBA	TBA
Thandeka Chauke	Legal counsellor: citizenship and statelessness		Guest	TBA	TBA
Dr Gérard Labuschagne	Investigative forensic psychologist		Guest	TBA	TBA
Anele Siswana	Clinical psychologist		Guest	TBA	TBA
Meisie Mabaso	Bester's mother (EWN and eNCA audio recordings)		Guest	TBA	TBA
Mathaba Kgalanyane	Extras		Guest	TBA	TBA
Johnny Maponya	Extras		Guest	TBA	TBA
Shalini Indradeo-Calidin	Extras		Guest	TBA	TBA

== Episodes ==
No.	Title	Directed by	Teleplay by	Original release date
1	"The Fire in Cell 35"	Nikki Comninos	Nikki Comninos	15 March 2024
A journalist exposes an inconvenient truth that Thabo Bester is alive and at large. The investigation reveals his dark plans with his partner in crime Dr Nandipha, involving stolen bodies, double lives and scams worth millions.
2	"#AMINEXT"	Nikki Comninos	Nikki Comninos	15 March 2024
Bester's getaway prompts a search for the criminal who committed rape and murder, and should be incarcerated. Returning to Bester's early years, it is evident that he had the characteristics of a deceitful fraudster. His crimes have a ripple effect, causing destruction in their aftermath.
3	"Episode 3"	Nikki Comninos	Nikki Comninos	22 March 2024
A glamorous doctor who had it all, but chose a criminal life. Her family has been destroyed in the process. Why did Nandipha do it? Is she another victim or a cold-blooded accomplice in love with Bester?
4	"Episode 4"	Nikki Comninos	Nikki Comninos	22 March 2024
If Bester is alive, then who is the dead body? The forensics of the night reveal a grieving family and a corrupt prison system implicating high-ranking officials. Amidst the chaos, Bester and Nandipha exploit the legal system.
