= Rob Rose (South African journalist) =

South African journalist

- Education: University of the Witwatersrand
- Occupation: Investigative journalist
- Years active: 2000–present
- Awards: Recht Malan Prize; Nieman Fellowship; Taco Kuiper Award for Investigative Journalism

Rob Rose is a South African business journalist who was editor of the Financial Mail between 2016 and 2024. A two-time winner of the Taco Kuiper Award for Investigative Journalism for his investigative reporting on corruption, he is currently a writer at Currency.

== Career in journalism ==
Rose studied at the University of the Witwatersrand, where he completed a BA in 1995 and an LLB in 2000. While a law student, he worked briefly at Engineering News, and, after graduating, he decided to pursue a career in journalism only a few weeks into his articles. Beginning at I-Net Bridge, he went on to work as a business journalist at Business Day from 2002 to 2007, when he joined the Financial Mail as a banking writer.

Subsequently Rose joined the investigative reporting team at the Sunday Times, where he, Stephan Hofstatter, and Mzilikazi wa Afrika co-wrote a series of award-winning articles between 2011 and 2013. Hofstatter and wa Afrika's team was later criticized for reporting fake news, including in one exposé which Rose had co-written about extrajudicial police killings by the so-called Cato Manor "death squad." The Taco Kuiper Award for Investigative Journalism panel rescinded the runner-up award that the death squad story had received, describing the reporting as "shoddy and amateurish," and the Sunday Times voluntarily returned the story's other awards, including several Sikuvile (Mondi Shanduka) Journalism Awards.

After a stint as editor of the Sunday Times's Business Times from 2013, Rose returned to the Financial Mail in 2015. He was deputy editor of the Financial Mail under editor Tim Cohen, and he replaced Cohen as editor in 2016. He led the magazine for eight years before resigning at the end of January 2024. Thereafter he joined Currency, a new financial news publication that launched in September 2024. He is a member of the International Consortium of Investigative Journalists.

== Books ==
Rose's first book, The Grand Scam: How Barry Tannenbaum Conned South Africa's Business Elite, was published in 2014 by Zebra Press and investigated Barry Tannenbaum's corporate fraud, a story which Rose had broken at the Financial Mail in June 2009.

His second book, Steinheist: Markus Jooste, Steinhoff and SA's Biggest Corporate Fraud, covered Markus Jooste and the Steinhoff scandal. Published in 2018 by NB Publishers, it won the Recht Malan Prize at the 2019 Media24 Books Literary Awards. It was adapted into a docuseries of the same name, featuring interviews with Rose, which premiered on Showmax in 2022.

== Other awards ==
Rose received the 2009 Taco Kuiper Award for his reporting on the Tannenbaum fraud, and he, Hofstatter, and wa Afrika shared the 2011 Taco Kuiper Award for their Sunday Times reporting on corruption by Mac Maharaj's associates.

At the Sanlam Financial Journalism Awards, Rose was named Financial Journalist of the Year four times, in 2010, 2016, 2019, and 2023.

He was a Nieman Fellow at Harvard University in 2011.
