= Vodacom Journalist of the Year Awards =

The Vodacom Journalist of the Year Awards are annual South African awards for journalism in a number of categories, awarded by Vodacom.

== List of national winners ==
Year	Journalist	Publisher	Ref.
2003	Sam Sole	Mail & Guardian	
2004	Jacques Pauw	SABC	
2005	Renee Bonorchis and Ann Crotty	Business Report	
2006	Sam Sole, Stefaans Brümmer and Wisani wa ka Ngobeni	Mail & Guardian	
2006	Bruce Cameron	Personal Finance	
2007	Hazel Friedman	SABC	
2008	Brett Horner, Chandre Prince and Ntando Makhubu	Daily Dispatch	
2009	Nomsa Maseko	Radio 702	
2010	Barbara Friedman	eTV	
2011	Stephen Hoffstatter and Mzilikazi wa Afrika		
2012	No awards		
2013	Stephen Hoffstatter, Mzilikazi wa Afrika and Rob Rose		
2014	Bongani Fuzile and Mphumzi Zuzile		
2015	James Oatway and Beauregard Tromp		
2016	David Ritchie		
2017	Branko Brkic, Pauli van Wyk, Lester Freamon, Adriaan Basson, Richard Poplak, Adi Eyal, Micah Reddy, Susan Comrie, Angelique Serrao, Stefaans Brümmer, Antoinette Muller, Marianne Thamm, Sam Sole, Tabelo Timse, Pieter-Louis Myburgh, Craig McKune, Lionel Faull, Rebecca Davis and Sally Evans	Daily Maverick, amaBhungane and News24	
2018	Alastair Otter and Laura Grant	Media Hack	
2018	Bongani Fuzile	Daily Dispatch	
2019	Tammy Petersen	News24	
2020	Susan Comrie	amaBhungane	
2020	Dasen Thathiah	eNCA	
2021	Siphamandla Goge	eNCA	
2022	Raymond Joseph	GroundUp	
2023	Jeff Wicks	News24	
2023	Daniel Steyn and Marecia Damons	GroundUp	
