= Imperial Military Hospital, Baragwanath =

Geography
- Location: Diepkloof, Johannesburg, Transvaal, South Africa
- Coordinates: 26°15′41.99″S 27°56′25.62″E

Organisation
- Care system: Military personnel

History
- Opened: 1942
- Closed: 1948

Links
- Other links: List of hospitals in South Africa

The Imperial Military Hospital, Baragwanath, was a British military hospital built near Johannesburg, South Africa, during the Second World War. After the war it was purchased by the South African government and became one of the biggest hospitals in the world. Today it is called Chris Hani Baragwanath Hospital.

== Background ==
At the beginning of the war the South African government, Parliament and electorate were divided on whether or not to join Great Britain in the war against Germany. When South Africa did declare war against Germany, her forces were committed to serve in Africa only. In June 1940 Italy declared war on the Allies and in August that year it invaded British Somaliland. Meanwhile, South African forces had moved to Kenya, as the war had moved to Africa.

In September 1940 the British government asked the South African government to provide health care facilities for Imperial troops of the Middle East Command. It suggested two hospitals of 1,200 beds each in the Cape and Natal. South Africa decided to rather build one of the hospitals near Johannesburg, Transvaal. There was already a university medical faculty, a nurses' training college, and facilities for rehabilitation. The site of the proposed hospital was to be on the farm Diepkloof, south-west of the centre of town. The ground was bought from The Corner House mining group and it was to be situated at the 8th milestone on the road from Johannesburg to Potchefstroom. It was decided to call the hospital the Imperial Military Hospital, Baragwanath.

== The name of the hospital ==
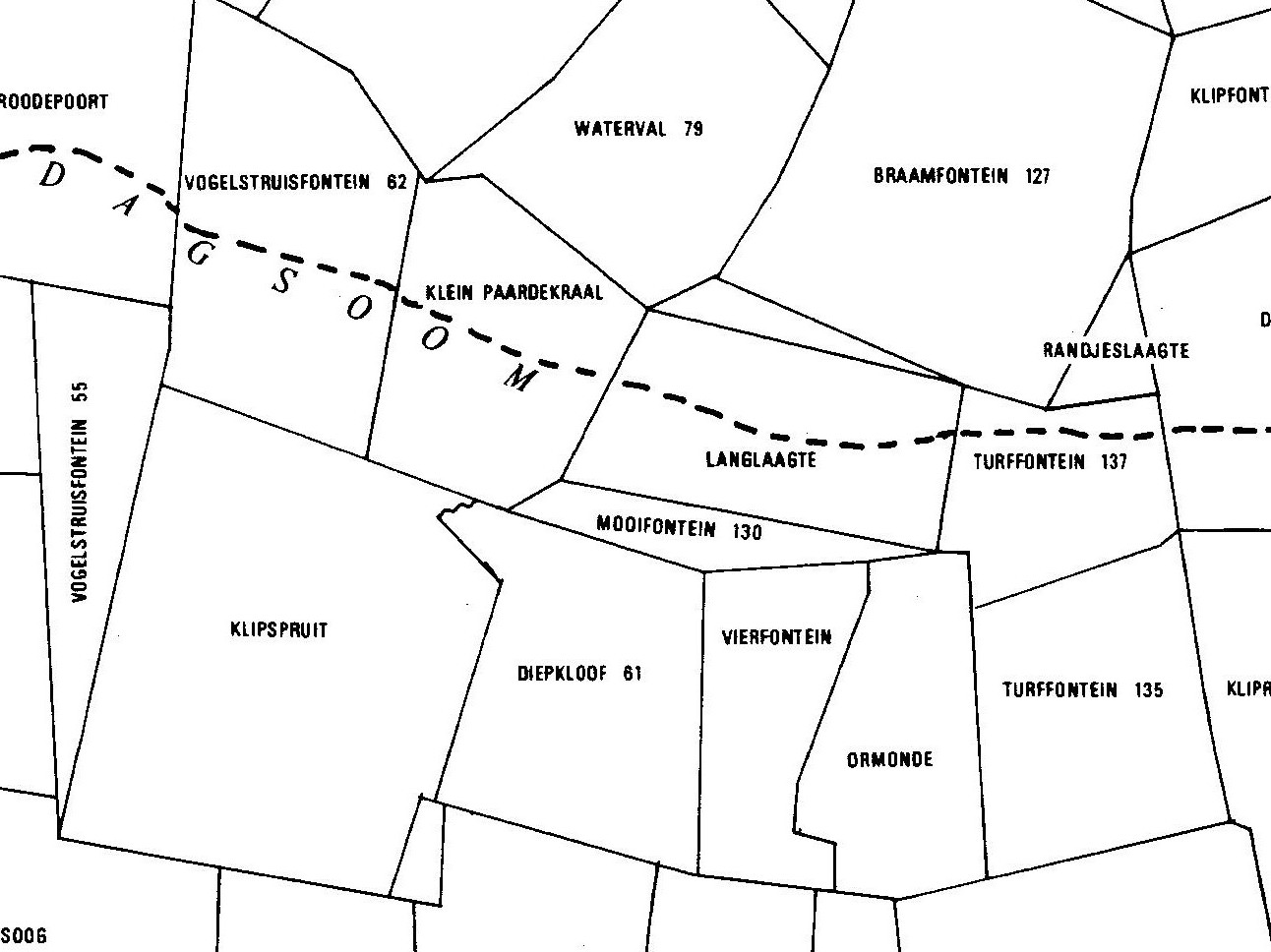
Diepkloof was south-west of the centre of town, which was on Randjeslaagte

Sometime after the discovery of gold in 1886, a young Cornishman, John Albert Baragwanath, arrived on the gold fields to make his fortune. He decided to open a refreshment station near the place where the roads from Cape Town and Kimberley met, about a day's journey by ox-cart south of Johannesburg. He called it The Wayside Inn, but transport riders simply called it Baragwanath's place. After the First World War an aerodrome was built close by and it was called Baragwanath as well. When the Second World War started, the Baragwanath aerodrome was used by both RAF and SAAF air crews under the Joint Air Training Scheme.

== The building ==
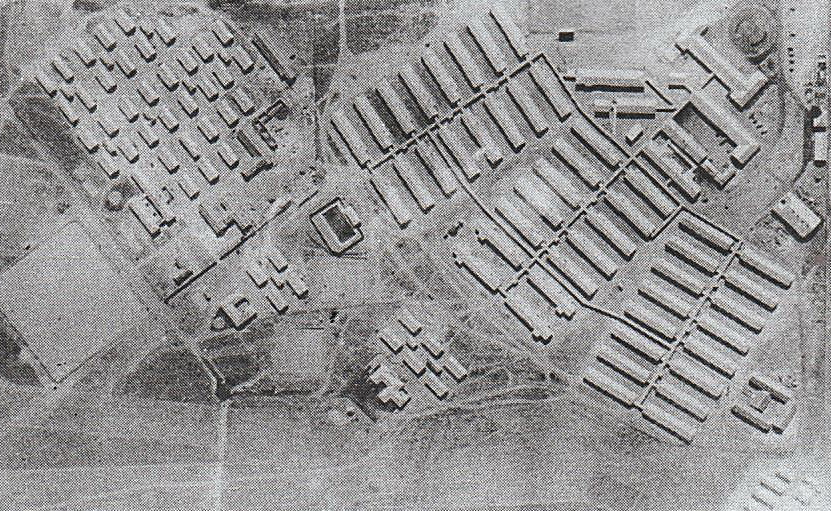
Baragwanath Hospital, 1942

The initial estimate of the cost of erecting the hospital was £324,000, but it was then decided to make provision for 1,544 beds (instead of 1,200) because of the increase in hostilities in the Middle East. The layout of the hospital resembled a military camp with many huts containing the various wards. There were about 50 wards that could accommodate 40 beds each. The Johannesburg municipality provided electricity, water and drainage. Construction commenced on 3 November 1941 and the first patients were admitted on 28 May 1942. A section was reserved for the medical and surgical treatment of tuberculosis. There was also a workshop for occupational therapy. The final cost of the hospital was £328,000. Prime Minister Jan Smuts officially opened the hospital on 23 September 1942.

The people of Johannesburg supported the hospital throughout the war by providing entertainment and gifts for the patients. In February 1943 bowling greens were donated by the local bowling associations. Further sporting facilities including tennis courts, a swimming pool, a short golf course, and pitches for cricket, football, and hockey were provided.

== Running of the hospital ==
The first Officer Commanding Baragwanath was Lieutenant Colonel D.L. Ferguson. He was succeeded by Colonel L.I. Braun on 3 June 1943 and him by Colonel W.H. du Plessis in the same year. Initially most of the staff were Canadians, but they were gradually reduced and replaced by locals. Colonel Alley took over command of the hospital in 1944. In 1946 he was succeeded by Colonel D.C. Scott. As the war in the Far East expanded, so the number of soldiers contracting tuberculosis increased. Johannesburg with its warm climate and dry winters was an ideal location to treat such patients. By 1944 Baragwanath had predominantly become a hospital for the treatment and convalescence of tuberculotics. From 1945 onwards the hospital was known as "130 Military Hospital and Convalescent Depot, Baragwanath." Even after the war ended there were still many soldiers convalescing in the Baragwanath Hospital. The royal family visited the hospital on 5 April 1947. In the surgical section King George VI invested Flight Lieutenant E.R.H.Watson, Royal Air Force, with the Distinguished Service Cross (United Kingdom). On the lawn Colonel Scott was invested as Commander of the Order of the British Empire, while Principal Matron C. Hose became a Lady of the Royal Red Cross. Captains T.S. Protheroe and J. Devine became Members of the British Empire. Squadron Leader R.A. Hedderwich received a Distinguished Service Cross.

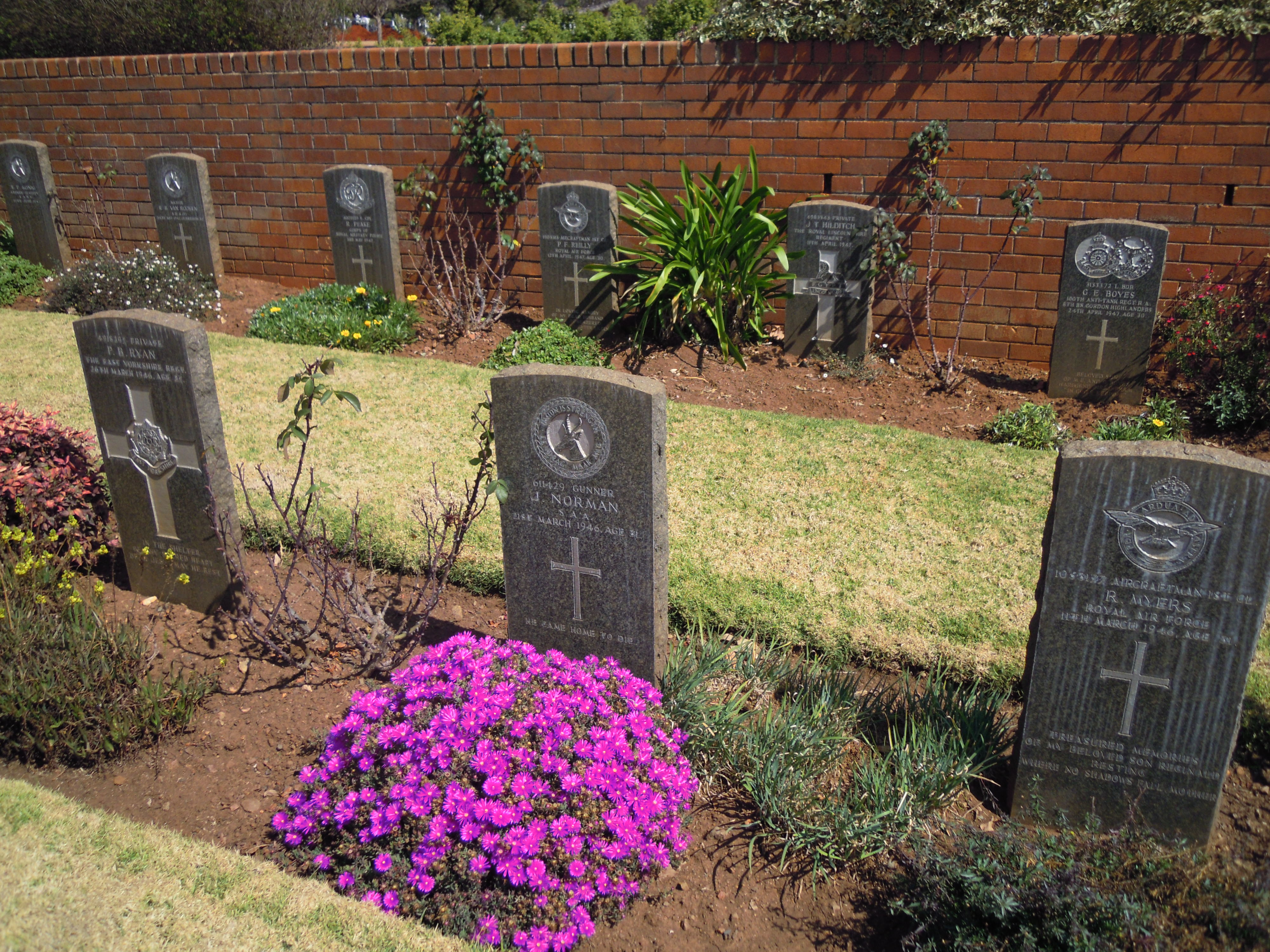
Commonwealth War Graves in West Park Cemetery

The servicemen who died at the hospital were buried in the West Park Cemetery in Johannesburg.

The Transvaal Provincial Administration paid the British government £1 million for the buildings, remaining equipment and stores. The military left on 1 September 1947. Dr J.D. Allen was the first civilian Superintendent. The first Matron was Joan MacLarty. They started converting the facilities at Baragwanath to accommodate the non-European section of the Johannesburg General Hospital. Initially the hospital was called the NEH, but later the name Baragwanath was used again. The hospital move to Baragwanath occurred in May 1948.
