= Nat Nakasa Award for Media Integrity =

Periodic award in South Africa

- Awarded for: Celebrates freedom of speech and media integrity by South African media practitioners in newspapers, magazines, broadcasting and online print media.
- Sponsored by: South African National Editors Forum
- Country: South Africa
- Presented by: The Print & Digital Media SA, SA National Editor's Forum and the Nieman Society of Southern Africa
- Reward: R 20 000
- First award: 1998
- Website: sanef.org.za/awards/

The Nat Nakasa Award for Media Integrity is an award presented to a South African media practitioner in newspapers, magazines, broadcasting and online print media and whose reporting celebrates freedom of speech and media integrity. The award is managed and presented by the South African National Editors Forum (SANEF).

== History ==
The award is named in honour of a black South African journalist and writer Nat Nakasa. Nat Nakasa was born in outside Durban in 1937. After leaving school at seventeen and after many jobs, he was employed a year later as a junior reporter at the Ilanga Lase Natal, a Zulu language weekly. After attracting the attention of Sylvester Stein of the Drum magazine, he joined the magazine in 1957. He and the other journalists writings at the Drum were influenced by the Suppression of Communism Act, 1950 and had to show the effects of Apartheid indirectly on black lives without condemning it directly for fear of being banned from practising journalism.

In 1961, he had an article entitled The Human Meaning of Apartheid for The New York Times. In 1963, he announced the formation of a quarterly literary magazine called The Classic, a magazine in English for black intellectual writers and poets from around Africa. It first published in June 1963 and would feature writers such as Doris Lessing and Leopold Senghor and would later be edited by writer Barney Simon. In 1963, the Publications and Entertainment Act was passed which allowed the South African government broad powers to ban or censor content it deemed unfavorable to the interest of the country, further hindering Nakasa's work as he attempted to stay within the law. In 1964, Nakasa applied for a Nieman Fellowship, a journalism program at Harvard University, which was accepted for 1965 intake. At the same time, Allister Sparks, editorial page editor of the white anti-apartheid newspaper the Rand Daily Mail invited Nakasa to write a black perspective column for the paper.

On accepting a Nieman Fellowship, Nakasa applied for a passport, but like many other black intellectuals, was refused and would have to accept an exit permit instead which meant relinquishing his citizenship and not being allowed to return to South Africa. Unbeknown to Nakasa, the South African police had been monitoring him since 1959 and were about to issue him with a five-year banning order under the Suppression of Communism Act when left for the United States in October 1964. While attending the Nieman Fellowship, he participated in protest meetings against Apartheid at Cambridge, Massachusetts and in Washington DC and unsuccessfully attempted again to write an article for The New York Times. He completed his Nieman Fellowship at the end of June 1965, by which time he was short of money and his attempted to extend his visa beyond August seemed unsuccessful. Now living in Harlem, Nakasa seemed homesick, unable to return to South Africa, unsettled and drinking, he became depressed. On 14 July 1965, he committed suicide when he jumped from a friend's seven-story apartment.

The award calls for nominations each May for a prize of R20,000 and a certificate. The nominees are accessed by an independent panel of three judges who choose the winner. The award is presented by South African National Editors Forum (Sanef) at an award dinner ceremony in June. The award was first presented in 1998.

== Award criteria ==
The annual Nat Nakasa Award for Media Integrity accepts nominations of South African media practitioners such as journalists, editors, managers or media owners in the medium of newspapers, magazines and online publishers and who have proved the following in their career:

- Shown integrity and reported fearlessly;
- Displayed a commitment to serve the people of South Africa;
- Tenaciously striven to maintain a publication or other medium despite insurmountable obstacles;
- Resisted any censorship;
- Shown courage in making information available to the SA public;
- Any combination of the above.

== Past winners ==
The following people have won the Nat Nakasa Award:

- 1998 Jon Qwelane
- 1999 Mzilikazi wa Afrika
- 2000 Mathatha Tsedu & Wolfram Zwecker
- 2001 Mzilikazi wa Afrika, Andre Jurgens & Jessica Bezuidenhout (Sunday Times Investigations Team)
- 2002 Justin Arenstein (African Eye News Service)
- 2003 Debbie Yazbek (The Star)
- 2004 Buks Viljoen (The Lowvelder)
- 2005 Alf Kumalo
- 2006 Guy Berger
- 2007 Jacques Pauw
- 2008 Max du Preez
- 2009 Greg Marinovich
- 2010 Terry Bell
- 2011 No Winner
- 2012 Joe Thloloe
- 2013 Mondli Makhanya
- 2014 Alide Dasnois
- 2015 Peter Magubane
- 2016 Jacques Steenkamp, Suna Venter, Foeta Krige, Krivani Pillay, Busisiwe Ntuli, Vuyo Mvoko, Lukhanyo Calata and Thandeka Gqubule
- 2017 Sipho Masondo
- 2018 Branko Brkic
- 2019 Qaanitah Hunter
- 2020 South African Journalists
- 2021 Styli Charalambous
- 2022 Cebelihle Mbuyisa and Magnificent Mndebele
- 2023 Marecia Damons and Daniel Steyn
- 2024 Kyle Cowan, Jeff Wicks, and Theo Jeptha
- 2025 Shirley Govender
- 2026 Edwin Naidu

== Controversies ==
The award to Alide Dasnois was not without controversy. Alide Dasnois was dismissed as editor of the Cape Times in May 2014 when her paper published an article in December 2013 about a fishing tender linked to the Sekunjalo consortium on the front page instead of coverage of the former president Nelson Mandela's death. The Sekunjalo consortium has a controlling interest in Independent News & Media SA, the parent company of the Cape Times. The executive editor of the Pretoria News, Fikile Ntsikelelo-Moya, criticised the decision to award the 2014 prize to Dasnois in his column, saying those who had written the article had not been honoured. At the same award ceremony, Iqbal Survé, owner of Independent News & Media SA, was reported by several journalists present, to have walked out after the receipt of award by Alide Dasnois. He later claimed he had a prior engagement.
