= Johan Kotze (criminal) =

South African criminal (born 1961)

- Born: Johan Kotze; 1961 (age 64–65); Gobabis, Namibia
- Motive: Revenge for divorce; Claimed victims "ruined" his life; Alleged discovery of wife with another man
- Convictions: Murder; Rape; Kidnapping; Assault
- Penalty: Two life sentences plus 25 years imprisonment

Details
- Victims: Ina Bonette (tortured and raped multiple times); Conrad Bonette (murdered)
- Date: 3 January 2012
- Country: South Africa
- Locations: Modimolle, Limpopo province
- Weapons: .22 caliber firearm, screwdriver, pliers, knife
- Date apprehended: 12 January 2012
- Imprisoned at: Kgosi Mampuru II Security Prison

Johan Kotze (born 1961), nicknamed the Modimolle Monster, is a convicted South African murderer and rapist serving two life sentences in a high-security prison. He was convicted for torturing his ex-wife, Ina Bonette, allowing three workers to rape her, and murdering her 19-year-old son, Conrad Bonette, in a violent revenge attack following their divorce.

After an eight-day nationwide manhunt involving Interpol, the Hawks, the public, and private security companies, Kotze surrendered to police on 12 January 2012 at a friend's home in Schoeman Street, Drie Hekke, Limpopo. He was sentenced by the Pretoria High Court on 17 July 2013 to two life sentences and an additional 25 years, along with his three accomplices.

Dubbed the "Modimolle Monster," Kotze became South Africa's most wanted criminal from 3 to 12 January 2012. His photo was circulated to the public as part of the national and international manhunt. During his time on the run, he hid in his white Toyota Fortuner, parking just a few kilometers from the crime scene.

== Early life ==
Johan Kotze was born in Namibia in 1961 and attended Wennie du Plessis High School in Gobabis. Orphaned at a young age, he was initially cared for by a woman from Hentiesbaai before being adopted by a farmer named Kotze. He grew up in what was described as a "good home," though later accounts would depict a troubled life. The Kotze family eventually relocated to Prieska in the Northern Cape, where Kotze reportedly worked as a sheriff of the court.

During his time in the Northern Cape, Kotze earned the nickname MacGyver, referencing the 1980s TV character known for his resourcefulness and ability to escape dangerous situations. The moniker was linked to Kotze's reputation as a "slippery character" who evaded accountability despite allegations of serious crimes, including the unsolved murders of two elderly women in 1990 and 1993.

After the death of his adoptive father, Kotze bought shares in a farm near Jagersfontein in the Free State. However, disputes arose, leading to a legal battle in which the court ordered Kotze to return 366 sheep to the farm owners. Following this incident, he purchased a farm near Bloemfontein and began farming sheep and buck.

Kotze was married at least five times. One of his marriages was to Sarita Venter, whom he met in Bloemfontein in 2008. Their relationship ended tragically when Venter, reportedly emotionally abused and owed over R1 million by Kotze, died by suicide in November 2010.

Kotze has one known child, a daughter named Jo-Marie Kotze, born in 1995 from one of his previous marriages.

== Background ==
Ina Bonette married Johan Kotze in October 2010. The marriage quickly unraveled, and by 2011, Bonette had left Kotze. After their separation, she visited his house in Modimolle twice to retrieve her belongings. On 3 January 2012, Kotze called her again, claiming that a box with her items was still at his home. When she arrived, she parked her car outside the gate and asked Kotze for water as they spoke briefly outside. He invited her inside, and once she entered, he suddenly pulled a towel over her head and threw her onto a bed.

Three men - Andries Sithole, Pieta Mohlake, and Frans Mphaka - who had been hiding in a cupboard, emerged and helped Kotze subdue her as she struggled and screamed.

State witness Dirk van der Merwe, a friend of Kotze’s and his landlord, testified in November 2012 that he had visited Kotze’s house that morning for coffee. Van der Merwe owned the property where Bonette would later be tortured and raped, and her son would be killed. After leaving Kotze’s house, Van der Merwe received a call around 11 a.m. Kotze told him he had an appointment with Bonette later that day and wanted time alone with her to "talk things through." Kotze was reportedly emotional and told Van der Merwe that he no longer wanted to live.

Before Bonette’s arrival, Kotze called Van der Merwe again and asked him to remove palm trees near the house. He told Van der Merwe not to worry about labor, saying he had hired three men off the street to assist. Two of the men went with Van der Merwe to replant the trees elsewhere, while Kotze kept Andries Sithole behind, later insisting that Van der Merwe return with the other two men once the job was done.

In November 2012, Bonette described her harrowing ordeal in the Pretoria High Court. She testified that she was tied with ropes already fastened to the window bars and bed and had her mouth taped shut so tightly that she could barely breathe or scream.

"He kept throwing insults," Bonette recalled in court. "He said, ‘Today, you’re going to feel what it’s like to be f*d by krs.’ He blamed me for forcing him to sell his farm in Bloemfontein and accused me, my father, and my son Conrad of belittling him. The more I shook my head to show it wasn’t true, the more he assaulted me."

Bonette testified that Sithole helped Kotze remove her pants while Kotze restrained and hit her. She was tortured for nearly three hours with tools, including nails, screwdrivers, pliers, and a grinder. Kotze mutilated her breasts, cutting off one nipple while repeatedly blaming her for his problems. She begged the three men for help with her eyes, but they ignored her pleas and continued to assist Kotze.

At one point, Kotze lay next to Bonette and told her how much he loved her while threatening to force her son to have sex with her or shoot him if he resisted.

Kotze then used Bonette’s phone to call her son, Conrad Bonette, who was at the gym with his friend Marthinus Cloete. When Conrad answered, Kotze asked him to come over, claiming he wanted to discuss something. Cloete testified in court that Conrad found it odd that Kotze was calling from his mother’s phone but agreed to visit him.

Upon arriving at Kotze’s house, they noticed Bonette’s car parked outside. Kotze greeted them in a friendly manner and asked Cloete to fetch a crate from the garage while he led Conrad inside. Cloete searched for about 10 minutes but found no crate. As he walked back toward the house, he saw Kotze’s car speeding away and realized something was wrong.

Bonette testified that she heard her son’s arrival and Kotze’s footsteps as he walked "down the passage." She then heard Conrad plead, “No, Uncle, please don’t!” followed by a gunshot. This happened two more times before Conrad fell silent. Kotze had shot Conrad in the face, chest, and knee, killing him instantly.

Vivienne van der Merwe, Dirk van der Merwe’s wife and a friend of Bonette, arrived at the house shortly after. Seeing Cloete outside, she asked where everyone was. When Cloete said he didn’t know, they decided to investigate.

Walking down the passage, Cloete saw blood and found Conrad’s lifeless body in one of the rooms. He then saw Bonette struggling to untie herself. After helping her, Bonette rushed to the room where Conrad lay and emerged screaming, “He killed my son! Get me out of here!”

The three immediately drove to the Modimolle police station and rushed Bonette to the hospital, where she underwent multiple operations and was placed on anti-HIV medication.

== Arrest and sentence ==
Johan Kotze was arrested on 12 January 2012 at the house of his friend Dirk van der Merwe on Schoeman Street in Drie Hekke. After being on the run for eight days, Kotze, bruised, exhausted, and bleeding, finally arrived at Van der Merwe’s house seeking "help." Van der Merwe, who was part of an armed neighborhood watch group assisting the police in tracking Kotze, had his cellphone radioed to the authorities, helping them close in on the fugitive.

The night before his capture, on 11 January 2012, Kotze had crashed his white Toyota Fortuner after being spotted by members of the public while attempting to buy food at Modimolle's Duggans Supermarket and Bakery. He sped off but lost control of the car in the heavy rain, crashing into a tree. Community members chased him, but the dark night and violent storm allowed him to escape into the bush, where he injured himself while fleeing.

Police arrived at the crash site and seized Kotze's vehicle. Inside, they found blankets, clothes, newspaper clippings of articles reporting him as a fugitive, cash, and a small gas stove. Nearby, they discovered his makeshift hideout, which contained broken tree branches, empty water bottles, food remnants, discarded toilet paper, and supermarket plastic bags.

The following day, around midday, Kotze quietly approached Van der Merwe's house, having eluded capture the previous night. Van der Merwe later recounted his fear upon seeing Kotze, stating that he thought Kotze might kill him, as he could barely recognize the man he had known for years.

"It looked as though he hadn't slept for days. He was filthy and shaking like a leaf. He could barely stand. I couldn't believe it. I was terrified. When I saw him, he said he wanted to talk, that he wanted help. When he said that, I immediately knew that I had to phone the police. I thought he was going to kill me," Van der Merwe told The Star newspaper after Kotze's arrest on 12 January 2012.

On 17 July 2013, the Pretoria High Court sentenced Kotze and Andries Sithole to life imprisonment for the murder of Conrad Bonette. Their co-accused, Pieta Mohlake and Frans Mphaka, were acquitted of the murder charge but were found guilty of rape, assault, and kidnapping. The sentencing details were as follows:

- Johan Kotze - Murder (life imprisonment), Rape (life imprisonment), Kidnapping (10 years), Assault (15 years)
- Andries Sithole - Murder (life imprisonment), Rape (life imprisonment), Kidnapping (10 years), Assault (8 years)
- Pieta Mohlake - Rape (life imprisonment), Kidnapping (10 years), Assault (15 years)
- Frans Mphaka - Rape (life imprisonment), Kidnapping (10 years), Assault (8 years)

They were found guilty on 15 July 2013 and sentenced two days later.

== Testimony ==
Johan Kotze took the stand at the Pretoria High Court in April 2013 and testified that he caught his wife Ina Bonette cheating. He told Judge Bert Bam that he saw Bonnette with another man at a dance on New Year's Eve in 2011. Kotze said they had a "happy marriage" but broke up several times since they tied the knot in October 2010, and stayed in different homes. He said Bonette and the man hugged and kissed before leaving the dance hall and he followed them to see where they would go, and they went to Bonette's house. He added that he was emotionally pained by this and vented his anger on his daughter's cat that he found sleeping on his bed on that night. "I very aggressively threw [the cat] away from me,” he said on 16 April 2013, while wiping away tears. Bonette was present in court. She shook her head while Kotze testified. Kotze said he obtained a protection order against Bonnette after their second split, but on 19 November 2010, just a month after they got married, he went back to Bonette to ask for forgiveness. They also discussed the possibility of renting a house together, according to Kotze. On 1 January 2012 he said he phoned Bonette and also saw her in town and told her they needed to talk about what happened on New Year's Eve. But when they met again on 3 January 2012 he was still "terribly upset" and that's how he apparently decided to inflict pains on her. Kotze's matriculant 18-year-old daughter from a previous marriage, Jo-Marie Kotze, testified that she had spent the Christmas period with her father and had an arrangement to visit him again on 3 January 2012. She said a day or so before the 3 January 2012 incident her father called and narrated a story to her about how he had caught Ina Bonette with another man. He loved her very much, was very disappointed and was extremely hurt she did that to him. She said she advised him to end the marriage with Ina Bonette so that they could move on with their lives and her father sounded like someone who agreed to it. After testifying against her father, she began crying and sobbed when she hugged him while father consoled daughter in his arms while also closer to shedding tears.

== History of abusing others and claims of psychological disorders ==
Johan Kotze's lawyer, Piet Greyling, argued in court that Kotze should not be held accountable for the torture and rape of Ina Bonette and the murder of her son, Conrad, because Kotze suffered from psychological problems. On 3 July 2013, psychologist Tertia Spannenberg testified on Kotze’s behalf, stating that he was depressed and diagnosed with "narcissistic personality disorder" and "acute stress disorder," which allegedly caused him to disconnect from reality. Spannenberg claimed that Kotze’s obsession with Bonette worsened after he saw her with another man on New Year's Eve, triggering emotional trauma and stress. She also mentioned a heated argument on 3 January 2012, during which Bonette placed a vibrator on Kotze’s table and provocatively told him to use it with his next wife, further worsening his mental state. Spannenberg observed Kotze for four hours at Kgosi Mampuru II Maximum Security Prison.

However, psychologist Cobus Coetzee, testifying for the prosecution, contradicted this assessment. Coetzee, part of a three-member team that observed Kotze for two months at Weskoppies Psychiatric Hospital in Pretoria, stated that Kotze did not suffer from any mental disorder and was fully aware of the wrongfulness of his actions. The other two experts on the team shared Coetzee’s conclusion.

Dirk van der Merwe, Kotze’s close friend who helped police capture him on 12 January 2012, later remarked that Kotze deserved the death penalty rather than the life sentences imposed on him by the South African High Court on 17 July 2013. Van der Merwe also testified about a disturbing incident in late 2011 when Kotze took a woman named Lizette on a holiday trip. While they were river rafting, Kotze allegedly hit Lizette with an oar, abruptly ending their romantic relationship.

Professor Dap Louw from the University of the Free State described Kotze as a “five-star, violent and sadistic psychopath” who manipulated others throughout his life. He added that, had the prosecution asked him to testify, he would have recommended a life sentence. Another expert, Professor Christiaan Bezuidenhout from the University of Pretoria’s criminology department, argued that people like Kotze have no place in society and are likely to reoffend if released. Bezuidenhout emphasized that psychopathy is not classified as a mental illness and, therefore, does not mitigate accountability in court. “He still has the ability to distinguish between right and wrong. He knew what he was doing,” Bezuidenhout explained.

=== History of abusing others ===
Kotze had a history of violent behavior before the crimes that led to his conviction. While living in the Northern Cape, he earned the nickname "McGuyver" due to his cunning and slippery nature. He was implicated in the 1990 killing of a 60-year-old black woman, whom he shot dead after finding her on a farm searching for her son. In 1993, Kotze was accused of murdering Bet Botha, a 64-year-old white woman, but was acquitted due to insufficient evidence.

In 2008, Kotze married Sarita Venter, a wealthy woman from Bloemfontein, whom he subjected to emotional abuse. He misused her trust and allegedly misappropriated her business funds under the guise of making investments, leaving her in financial ruin. Venter committed suicide in November 2010 after Kotze abandoned her to marry Ina Bonette in October 2010.
