= Thabo Bester =

South African criminal

- Born: 13 June 1986 (age 40); Johannesburg, Gauteng, South Africa
- Other names: TK Nkwana; Katlego Tom Motsepe Nkwana; William Kelly
- Known for: Rape; murder; con artistry; prison escape
- Height: 170 cm (5 ft 7 in)
- Status: Incarcerated
- Convictions: 2011 - two counts of rape 2012 - one count of murder
- Criminal charges: Rape, murder
- Penalty: Life imprisonment (sentenced in 2012)
- Reward amount: R100 000 (Fidelity ADT)
- Capture status: Arrested
- Time at large: 11 months
- Escaped: 3 May 2022
- Escape end: 8 April 2023

Details
- Victims: Nomfundo Tyulu
- Country: South Africa
- Location: Pretoria, Gauteng
- Imprisoned at: Kgosi Mampuru II Management Area

Thabo Bester (born 13 June 1986) is a South African convicted rapist and murderer who escaped from the Mangaung Correctional Centre in South Africa after faking his death in a fire in his prison cell in May 2022. He was on the run for almost a year before being caught in Arusha, Tanzania on 8 April 2023. He was arrested along with his partner and alleged accomplice, celebrity doctor Nandipha Magudumana. Bester had become known as the "Facebook rapist" because he used the platform to lure models with fake job opportunities. He pleaded guilty to two rapes and one murder and was sentenced to life imprisonment.

== Early life ==
Thabo Bester was born at the Chris Hani Baragwanath Hospital in Soweto, South Africa on 13 June 1986. Home Affairs Minister Aaron Motsoaledi told the media in 2023, that Maria Mabaso, the mother of Thabo, was never able to register her son after giving birth to him. Mabaso was not registered herself, due to her own mother working on farms and not registering her birth. The Home Affairs Minister also said that Thabo Bester was first convicted at the age of 17, when he would have been eligible to get an ID. Bester has become infamous for his criminal activities and con artistry. He has used multiple aliases throughout this criminal career. At the age of 19, he spent two years in jail for fraud before breaking parole and raping two models and murdering his girlfriend, Nomfundo Tiyhulu. He pleaded guilty to the rapes in 2011 and to the murder in 2012. He was sentenced to life imprisonment.

== Imprisonment and escape ==
Bester was imprisoned at Mangaung Correctional Centre in South Africa, a private maximum security prison owned and run by multinational security company G4S. While in prison, Bester ran a sham media and events company called 21st Century Media, which posed as a subsidiary of multinational media group 21st Century Fox. The sole director of the company was Phumudzo Thenga, but Bester is believed to have played a hands-on role in the company, sending instructions via text message while in prison. In 2018, the company became the subject of a media outcry after it falsely advertised Taraji P. Henson and Halle Berry as guest speakers of an event. Henson and Berry rubbished the claims on Twitter and the event never took place. Thenga later distanced herself from the company, saying that she was scammed by Bester.

On 3 May 2022, Bester was declared dead after a fire broke out in his cell at Mangaung Correctional Centre in Bloemfontein and a body was found, burned beyond recognition. The Department of Correctional Services announced his death to the public on the same day and said that he had committed suicide. In October 2022, South African news agency GroundUp published an article by Marecia Damons raising questions about the investigation into Bester's death. In January 2023, GroundUp published another article by Damons citing post-mortem results on the body found in Bester's cell, which found that the body was dead before the fire broke out. The GroundUp article also revealed that the police had started to investigate a murder.

On 15 March 2023, GroundUp published a third article, by Marecia Damons and Daniel Steyn, revealing evidence that Bester had faked his death in the fire and escaped from prison. The article also mentioned a court case brought by Nandipha Magudumana, a celebrity doctor, to get the body found in the cell, which was believed to be that of Bester at the time, returned to her. In her court papers, Magudumana claimed to be Bester's customary law wife.

On 17 March 2023, Damons and Steyn published another article containing pictures of Bester and Magudumana shopping in a Woolworths grocery store in Sandton City. A week later, after public outcry, the Department of Correctional Services admitted that Bester had escaped from prison.

Private security firm, Fidelity, took to Facebook to offer a R100,000 award for any information that led to the arrest and conviction of Bester. It was later confirmed by police in April 2023 that the burnt body was that of Katlego Bereng Mpholo who had gone missing in April 2022.

In testimony before parliament in April 2023, Inspecting Judge for Correctional Services Edwin Cameron said that he was the source of information leaked to GroundUp.

== Life after prison and rearrest ==
After escaping from prison, Bester lived in a rented mansion in Hyde Park, Johannesburg, with Nandipha Magudumana. He used the pseudonym TK Nkwana. Bester and Magudumana ran a scam property company, Arum Properties, and convinced several people to pay deposits for construction projects which were never completed.

On 8 April 2023, Bester and Magudumana were arrested by Tanzanian authorities in Arusha, Tanzania. The couple was deported and arrived back in South Africa several days later. As of May 2023, eight people had been charged in connection with Bester's escape.

In 2025, Bester and Magudumana filed a petition to bar Netflix from airing a three-part documentary series about Bester titled Beauty and the Bester, saying that it was defamatory and violated their rights to a fair trial. The petition was rejected, with the presiding Judge Sulet Potterill saying that the matter was "firmly in the public domain".

== Citizenship ==
Bester was never officially documented as a South African citizen with the Department of Home Affairs. Minister of Home Affairs, Aaron Motsoaledi said that when Bester was caught in Tanzania in April 2023, he was found in possession of an American passport under the guise of Tom Williams Kelly. Motsoaledi said that although Bester was born in Chris Hani Baragwanath Hospital on 13 June 1986, he was never registered on the National Population Register. On 22 May 2023, Motsoaledi announced that Bester had been added to the National Population Register and had been furnished with an ID document.

== See also ==
- Tracking Thabo Bester
- Jolly Mutesi, victim of one of Bester's schemes
- Brown Mogotsi, an informer who claims he made the arrest in Tanzania.
