= Nandipha Magudumana =

South African medical practitioner

- Born: Nandipha Sekeleni; 15 September 1989 (age 36); Bizana, Eastern Cape, South Africa
- Other names: Dr. Nandipha
- Education: University of the Witwatersrand (BHSc, MBChB)
- Occupation: Medical doctor
- Years active: 2014–2021
- Known for: Making the Mail & Guardian 200 Young South Africans finalist
- Criminal status: Incarcerated
- Spouse: Mkhuseli Magudumana (m. 2013)
- Partner: Thabo Bester
- Children: 2
- Medical career
- Profession: Doctor; surgeon
- Institutions: Edenvale Hospital (2014–2015); Far East Rand (2015–2017); Optimum Medical Aesthetics Solutions (2017–2021)
- Sub-specialties: Cosmetic surgery solutions
- Website: optimumsolutions.co.za

Nandipha Magudumana (née Sekeleni), also known as Dr. Nandipha, is a South African former medical practitioner and celebrity doctor who graduated from the University of the Witwatersrand. Her medical license was revoked, and she is currently imprisoned in Kroonstad, Free State.

== Early and personal life ==
Born Nandipha Sekeleni on 15 September 1989 in Bizana, Eastern Cape, and raised in Port Edward, KwaZulu-Natal. She completed her primary and high school studies at Port Edward Primary School and Port Shepstone High School, respectively. She went on to study medicine and graduated from the University of the Witwatersrand in 2013. Magudumana holds a Bachelor of Health Sciences in Biomedical Sciences, a Bachelor of Surgery and a Bachelor of Medicine.

She was married in 2013, to a medical doctor, Mkhuseli Magudumana, and they had two children. The couple entered into a civil marriage, and although they are no longer together, according to the Department of Home Affairs database, they are still registered as married.

== Career ==
After furthering her studies, she worked at Edenvale Hospital in 2014 for a year before moving to Far East Rand Hospital, where she became a highly sought-after physician specialising in anesthesiology, dermatology, plastic surgery and administering related medications. In 2017, Magudumana founded Optimum Medical Aesthetics Solutions, a facility that offered procedures for cosmetic surgery in Morningside, Sandton. In 2018, Magudumana was named a finalist for the Mail & Guardian 200 Young South Africans, the SADC Top 100 Young Leaders, and the Top 20 Most Influential Young South Africans lists. In 2019, she treated high-profile clients, including that year's Miss Universe, Zozibini Tunzi.

In 2021, Magudumana's medical license expired. In May 2023, the South African political party, the Democratic Alliance, requested that the Health Professions Council of South Africa revoke her medical license due to her failure to pay annual fees in April 2021. Magudumana and Thabo Bester co-founded Arum Properties, a construction company in 2021. GroundUp used a March 2023 piece to allege that they used the firm to scam people, and that it convinced numerous people to pay millions of rands for renovations and construction projects of which they never delivered.

== Legal issues ==
On 7 April 2023, Magudumana was arrested in Arusha, Tanzania, alongside Bester. She was deported to South Africa six days later, and has since been imprisoned at the Bizzah Makhate Correctional Centre, a women's prison in Kroonstad, Free State. A trial for Magudumana and Bester was set to begin on 10 February 2025 at the Bloemfontein High Court. However, it was delayed and rescheduled to 21 July 2025. On 16 May 2025, the Supreme Court of Appeal dismissed Magudumana's bid to have her arrest and deportation in Tanzania declared unlawful. The date of the trial was then moved to 19 September of that same year.

In September 2025, Bester and Magudumana filed a petition to bar Netflix from airing a three-part documentary series about the couple, Beauty and the Bester, saying that it was defamatory and violated their rights to a fair trial. The petition was rejected, with the presiding Judge Sulet Potterill saying that the overall matter was already "firmly in the public domain".

== See also ==
- Tracking Thabo Bester (2024)
- Beauty and the Bester (2025)
