= Commercial crime =

Commercial crime may refer to:

- Various types of White-collar crimes
- Financial crime
- Corporate crime
- State-corporate crime
- Some types of Organized crime, esp.
  - Transnational organized crime

== See also ==
- Category:Commercial crimes
