= William de Villiers =

South African lawyer

Andries William de Villiers (born 9 July 1957 in Nairobi) is a South African author who wrote Messengers, Watchmen and Stewards, a biographical register of clergymen licensed, ordained for service, or otherwise active, in the Anglican diocese of Cape Town prior to the death of Archbishop William West Jones on 21 May 1908 (1998).

De Villiers was born in Kenya and educated at schools there and in South Africa. He attended the University of Stellenbosch, graduating BA in 1978, and LLB in 1980. In 1981 he joined a major South African life assurance company, being assigned as the first legal adviser to the Port Elizabeth training unit. The following year he passed the examinations of the Institute of Life and Pension Advisers, and became a Fellow in 1983. In 1987 he was admitted as an Advocate of the Supreme Court of South Africa. He is a Knight of the Most Venerable Order of Saint John and served as President of the Cape of Good Hope District of St. John Ambulance from 2005 to 2017.

== Bibliography ==
- De Villiers, A.W. (1998). Messengers, Watchmen and Stewards, a biographical register of clergymen licensed, ordained for service, or otherwise active, in the Anglican diocese of Cape Town prior to the death of Archbishop William West Jones on 21 May 1908. Johannesburg: Historical Papers, The Library, University of the Witwatersrand.
