= Mangaung Prison =

Prison in Bloemfontein, South Africa

Coordinates: 29°13′55″S 26°18′08″E

The Mangaung Prison (Afrikaans: Mangaung-gevangenis) is a maximum security prison in Bloemfontein, Free State, South Africa. The prison is privately owned and managed by the company G4S as part of a consortium. The South African Department of Correctional Services signed a 25-year contract with the consortium in 2000. The prison can accommodate around 3,000 prisoners.

In October 2013, the department temporarily took over the prison, after G4S "lost effective control of the facility". In October, a female custodian with 13 years of experience was taken hostage by prisoners. She was later saved unharmed by a special police task force.

== 2022 escape ==
After staging a self-immolation in his cell on 3 May 2022, Thabo Bester escaped from the Mangaung Correctional Center with the apparent help of the guards.

== Documentary ==
In 2019 the documentary 'Prison for profit' was published about problems and use of excessive force in the prison. Investigative journalist Ruth Hopkins has mentioned that the South African minister for correctional services S'bu Ndebele in 2013 would arrange an investigation which would be published within 30 days. The report was not yet released in 2019.

== See also ==
- Brandvlei Correctional Centre
- Drakenstein Correctional Centre
- Kgosi Mampuru II Correctional Centre
- Pollsmoor Prison
- Moses Sithole serial killer
- Westville Prison
