= Barry Tannenbaum =

South African businessman (born 1966)

Barry Tannenbaum (born 1966) is a South African businessman who was accused of the largest corporate fraud in South Africa.

== Biography ==
Tannenbaum was born in Johannesburg in 1966.

In 2007, he moved to Sydney.

In 2009, he was accused of running a R10 billion Ponzi scheme in the largest corporate fraud in South Africa. The fraud promised 880 investors returns of 200% per year in investments related to pharmaceutical imports. However, South Africa never issued a formal extradition request.

In February 2015, he was an Uber driver in Runaway Bay, Queensland.
