= Chris Hani Baragwanath Hospital =

Chris Hani Baragwanath Academic Hospital
- Gauteng Department of Health
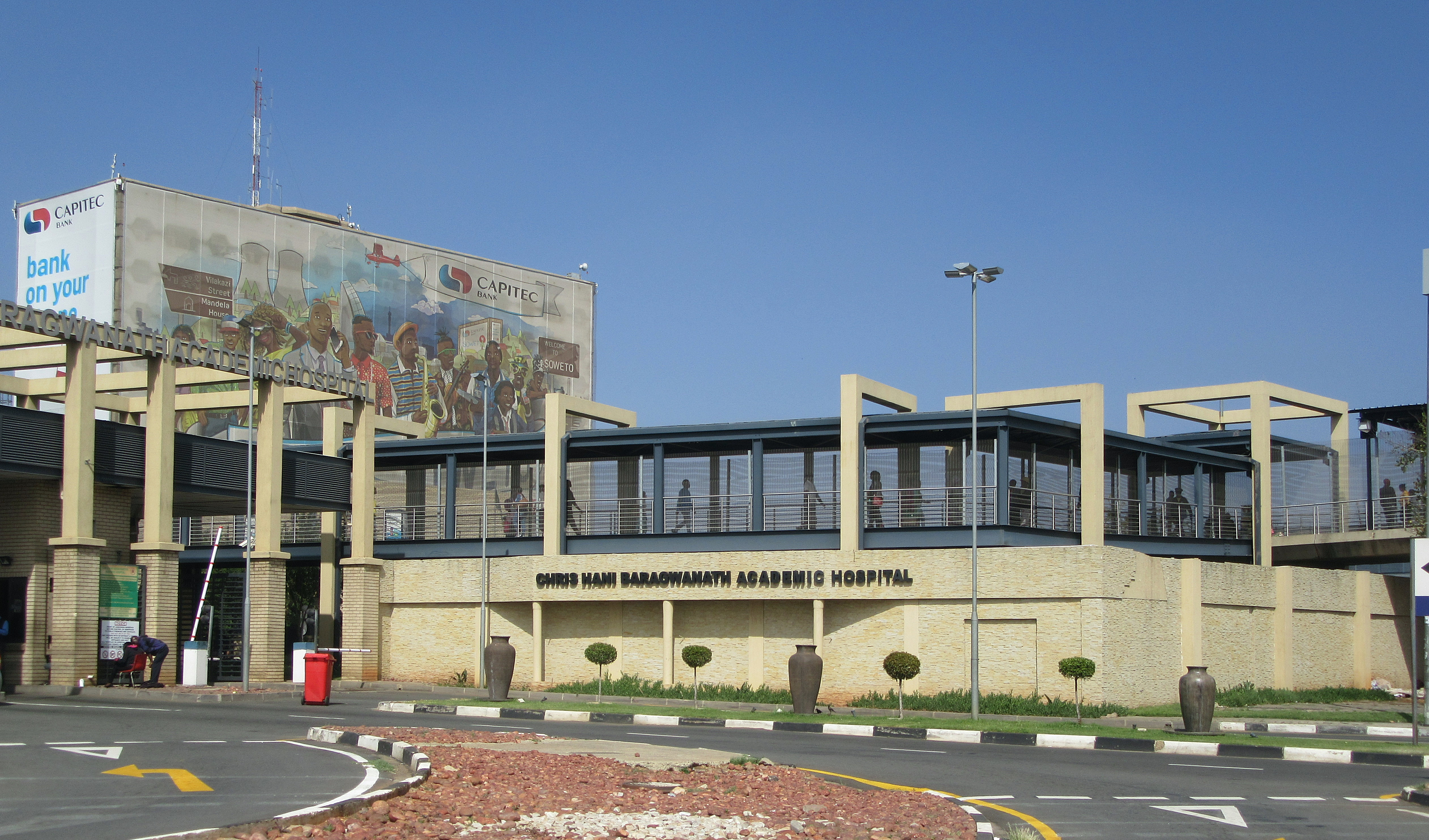
- Chris Hani Baragwanath Academic Hospital entrance

Geography
- Location: Soweto, Johannesburg, Gauteng, South Africa
- Coordinates: 26°15′39″S 27°56′35″E

Organisation
- Care system: Public
- Type: Hospital
- Affiliated university: University of the Witwatersrand

Services
- Emergency department: 10177
- Beds: 3,400

History
- Former name: Imperial Military Hospital, Baragwanath
- Opened: 1942; 84 years ago

Links
- Website: www.chrishanibaragwanathhospital.co.za
- Lists: Hospitals in South Africa

Chris Hani Baragwanath Academic Hospital (colloquially known as Bara) is a hospital in Johannesburg, South Africa. It is the largest hospital in Africa and seventh largest hospital in the world. It has 6,760 staff members, 3,400 beds and occupies 70 ha (170 acres). The hospital is located in Soweto, south of Johannesburg. It is one of the 40 Gauteng provincial hospitals, and is financed and managed by the Gauteng Provincial Department of Health. It is a teaching hospital for the University of the Witwatersrand Medical School, along with the Charlotte Maxeke Johannesburg Academic Hospital, Helen Joseph Hospital and the Rahima Moosa Mother and Child Hospital. It is an accredited Level one trauma centre. The hospital has trauma and emergency medicine facilities.

== History ==
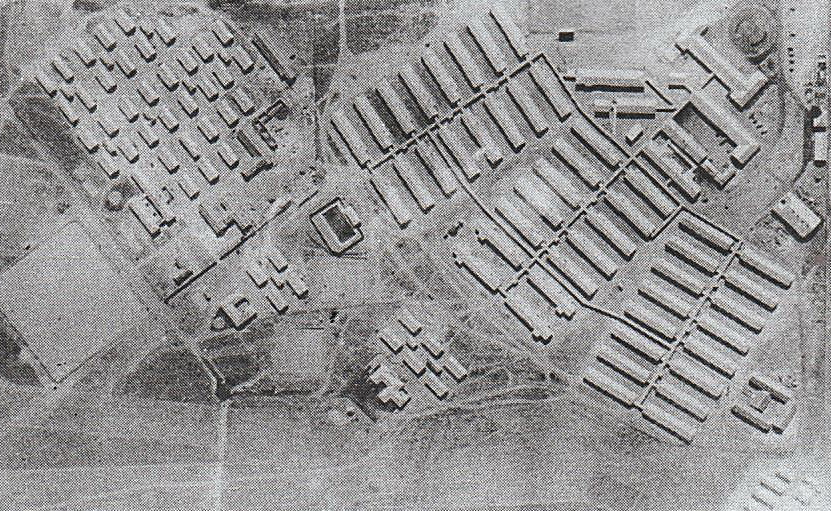
Imperial Military Hospital, Baragwanath, 1942

The Imperial Military Hospital, Baragwanath, was built in what today is Diepkloof in 1942 for convalescing British and Commonwealth soldiers. Field Marshal Jan Smuts noted during the opening ceremonies that the facility would be used for the area's black population after the war. In 1947 King George VI visited and presented medals to the troops there. From this start, grew Baragwanath Hospital (as it became known after 1948), reputedly the largest hospital in the southern hemisphere. In 1997 another name change followed, with the sprawling facility now known as Chris Hani Baragwanath Hospital in honour of the South African Communist Party leader who was assassinated in 1993.

== Administration ==
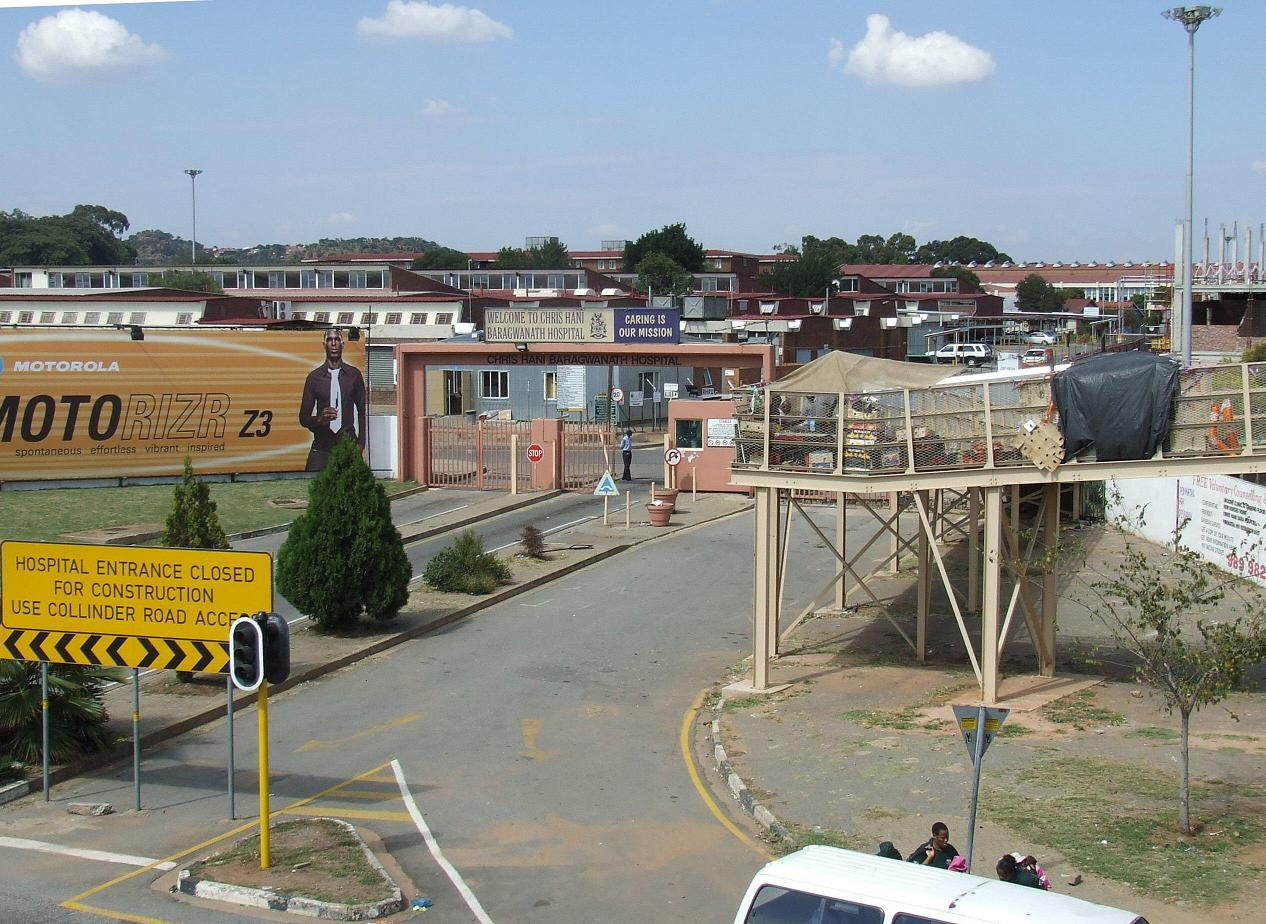
View of the hospital looking south

During the COVID-19 pandemic in South Africa, the Gauteng government spent R 528 million on the hospital; this included a new 500-bed facility. In August 2020, the Public Protector found administrative deficiencies that led to inefficiencies in the delivery of primary health care services. The hospital owes over R 66 million to the City of Johannesburg.

== Admissions and operations ==
More than two thousand patients check into the hospital's specialised clinics and out-patient departments daily, from catchment areas as far as Klerksdorp.
