= South African National Editors' Forum =

- Established: October 1996; 29 years ago
- Mission: Promoting quality, ethics and diversity in the South African media.
- Focus: media freedom policy submissions media research education and training programmes
- Chair: Nwabisa Makunga (2024)
- Members: 190 (2006)
- Address: 20 Baker Street
- Location: Rosebank, Johannesburg, Gauteng Province, South Africa
- Website: sanef.org.za

The South African National Editors’ Forum (SANEF) is a South African-based non-profit membership organisation for editors, senior journalists and journalism trainers. The SANEF supports South African journalism through a number of activities ranging from public statements supporting media freedom, running training programs for journalists, writing policy submissions to government, to sponsoring and conducting research into the state of the media in South Africa. The SANEF runs the annual Nat Nakasa Award for Media Integrity that recognises media practitioners that have improved South African journalism.

The SANEF was founded following the merger of the predominantly black South African Black Editors’ Forum and the predominantly white South African Conference of Editors in 1996, two years after South Africa's first post apartheid elections.

Activist Moses ka Moyo was a SANEF Council member.
