= List of magazines in South Africa =

This is a list of magazines and periodicals currently published within South Africa.

== A ==
- AA Traveller
- Africa Geographic
- Africa South
- African Expedition Magazine
- African Independent
- African Pilot
- Amakhosi
- Amandla
- Animaltalk
- Architect & Specificator
- Auto Trader

== B ==
- Baba & Kleuter
- Barbie
- Bicycling
- Bike SA Magazine
- Black Business Quarterly
- Bona
- Brainstorm
- Brand
- Business Brief
- Bulk Handling Today

== C ==
- Cape Town Etc
- CAR
- Caravan & Outdoor Life
- CEO
- Cirque Magazine
- CLASSICFEEL
- Compleat Golfer
- The Complete Fly Fisher
- House & Garden (South Africa)
- Corporate Finance Africa Magazine
- Cosmopolitan
- CSA (Cricket SA) (note that CSA (Cricket SA) and SA Cricket are two different magazines)

== D ==
- Debate Journal
- Dekat
- Destiny
- Destiny Man
- Digital Life
- Divestyle
- DO IT NOW Magazine
- Drive Out
- Drum

== E ==
- Elle Decoration
- Elle Magazine
- Engineering News
- Entrepreneur Magazine
- Essentials

== F ==
- FA News
- Fair Lady
- Farmer's Weekly
- Farmlink
- Femina
- FHM
- Financial Mail
- Finesse
- Finweek
- Food & Home Entertaining
- Forbes Africa
- Fresh Living (Pick 'n Pay)
- Fund Investor Insight

== G ==
- G Tribe
- The Gardener Magazine
- Getaway
- GINJA Food & Lifestyle Magazine
- Girlz Magazine
- Glamour
- Goeie Huishouding
- Golf Digest
- Good Housekeeping
- Good Taste
- GQ SA
- Grace
- The Grapevine Magazine
- Grazia SA
- GT MAG

== H ==
- Habitat
- Heat
- Home
- House & Leisure
- HQ (Horse Quarterly)
- Huisgenoot
- Hustler (S.A. edition)
- Hype
- Hello Cape Town
- Hello Joburg

== I ==
- Ideas / Idees
- Ignited Woman Mag
- Intiem
- Institutional Strategy Insights
- InStyle
- iWeek

== J ==
- Jewish Life
- JOY! Magazine
- JSE
- JUIG! Tydskrif

== K ==
- Kagenna Magazine
- Kick Off
- Kuier

== L ==
- Landbouweekblad
- Leadership
- Lééf Met Hart & Siel (Live With Heart & Soul)
- Leisure wheels
- LiG
- Lightstand
- Live Mag SA
- LIVEOUTLOUD Magazine
- Living & Loving
- Longevity
- Loslyf

== M ==
- Mahala
- Mamas & Papas
- Manwees
- Marie Claire
- Marketing Mix
- Maxim
- Men's Health
- Mense
- Mining Weekly
- Modern Athlete
- Modern Cyclist
- Most Influential Women in Business and Government
- Move!
- Mshana
- Metros Magazine, South Africa
- Mum's Mail
- My Loopbaan
- Melanie Styles

== N ==
- National Geographic
- Newsweek
- Naked Motoring
- Noseweek
- Nomad Africa

== O ==
- O, The Oprah Magazine
- Odyssey Magazine
- ON POINT Magazine
- OnTheBlock
- Old Africa Magazine

== P ==
- Pageant Magazine SA
- PCFormat
- PCMag
- People
- Personal Finance
- PM Africa Magazine
- Popular Mechanics
- Prestige Bulletin

== R ==
- Radio ZS
- Reader's Digest SA
- Real
- reality by Sanlam
- Ride
- Rolling Stone Africa
- Rooi Rose
- Runner's World

== S ==
- SA 4x4
- SA Career Focus
- SA Cricket
- SA Country Life
- SA Flyer
- SA Garden &Home
- SA Golf Trader
- SA Home Owner
- SA Hunter / Jagter
- SA India
- SA Rugby Magazine
- Safe Travel Magazine
- Saltwater Girl
- SA Mechanical Engineer
- Sandton
- Sarie
- Sarie Kos
- Savage Magazine
- Scope, (1966–1996)
- Seventeen
- SL Magazine
- Something Wicked
- Soul
- Speed & Sound
- StockFarm
- Student Mag
- Stuff
- Style
- Stywe Lyne (Tight Lines)
- Submerge Magazine
- Succeed Magazine
- Supernova - the mag for curious kids

== T ==
- Taste magazine (Woolworths)
- Tectonic Magazine
- Teen Zone
- Things to do With Kids Magazine
- Threads & Crafts
- Time
- Titans Building Nations
- Top 40 Music Magazine
- Top Billing
- Top Car
- Top Gear SA
- Tourism Tattler Trade Journal
- The Townships Housewife
- Travel Ideas
- True Love
- Die Tuinier Tydskrif
- Tuis

== V ==
- Veeplaas
- Very Interesting
- Very Interesting Junior
- Vrouekeur

== W ==
- Weg! / Go!
- WegRy
- WegSleep
- Weigh-Less
- Wesley Guild Magazine
- Wiel Motor Magazine
- Wildside
- Woema
- Woman and Home
- Women's Health
- Wrapped

== Y ==
- YOU
- Your Baby
- Your Business
- Your Family
- Your Pregnancy

== Z ==
- Zigzag Surf Magazine

== See also ==
- List of newspapers in South Africa
- List of radio stations in South Africa
- South African Audience Research Foundation (SAARF)
