= List of South African mass media =

The is a list of South African mass media, including newspapers, television stations, radio stations and various alternative media.

== Newspapers ==
=== National ===
- Beeld (available in 5 of 9 provinces)
- Business Day
- City Press
- Daily Maverick
- Daily Sun
- Die Burger
- Mail & Guardian
- News Everyday
- My World Global News
- The New Age
- Rapport
- SAMM News - currently available online
- The Sowetan
- Sunday Independent
- Sunday Sun
- Sunday Times
- Sunday World
- The Witness
- ILANGA
- Laudium Sun

== Television broadcasters ==
=== Free-To-Air ===
eMedia Investments

- e.tv
- eMovies
- eMovies Extra
- eExtra
- eReality
- ePlesier
- eToonz
- eSERIES
- eNCA

South African Broadcasting Corporation

- SABC 1
- SABC 2
- SABC 3
- SABC News
- SABC LEHAE
- SABC Education
- SABC Sport

=== Subscription-based ===
MultiChoice

- M-Net
- M-Net Movies
- Mzansi Magic
- KykNET
- Africa Magic
- Channel O
- SuperSport

Independent Stations

- Moja Love
- Mindset Learn
- Newzroom Afrika
- Movie Room
- Play Room
- DBE TV
- WildEarth
- Business Day TV
- Parliamentary TV
- People's Planet
- Via TV
- BRICS Africa Channel
- The Home Channel
- Ignition TV
- Hilaal TV
- Racing240
- MDNtv

Community Stations

- GauTV
- 1KZN
- Rising Sun TV (StarSat)
- Mpuma Kapa TV
- Cape Town TV
- Soweto TV via DStv until digital switch
- Tshwane TV
- Nongoma TV
- MYtv

=== Streaming Media ===
- Showmax
- Starlight Africa
- eVOD
- SABC Plus (formally called TelkomONE)
- Freevision Play
- Netflix
- Amazon Prime
- BritBox
- Disney+

=== Direct to home satellite broadcasters ===
- DStv
- OpenView HD
- StarSat

=== New satellite broadcasting licensees (not yet operational) ===
- e-Sat
- Telkom Media

=== New IPTV licensees (not yet operational) ===
- Telkom Media

== Radio stations ==
See: List of radio stations in South Africa

== Street newspapers ==
- Big Issue
- Homeless talk - a small newspaper produced in Johannesburg; its content is largely about the plight of the homeless; on sale at select shops and most traffic lights in Johannesburg

== Internet ==
- South Africa Today
- Quackdown (Exposes medical fraud and quackery)
- Bizcommunity.com
- BusinessTech
- MyBroadband
- South Africa Guide
- News24
- Thesouthafrican.com
- News Everyday
- Saffarazzi
- The South African
- ZWBDC.co.za
- The Baseline
- EBNewsDaily
- Briefly.co.za
- Newsroom
- Between 10and5
- Open Secrets, a nonprofit social justice organization

== See also ==
- Mass media in South Africa
- Africa Media Online
- Alternative media in South Africa
- List of magazines in South Africa
- Online newspapers published in South Africa
