= Telkom =

Telkom may refer to:

- Telkom Indonesia
- Telkom Kenya
- Telkom (South Africa)
  - Telkom Media, a pay-TV company subsidiary

== See also ==
- Telcom
- Telecom
- Telekom
- List of telephone operating companies
