= Telcom =

Telcom may refer to:

- Telephone company, a provider of telecommunications services, such as telephony and data communications
- Telcom (Ireland), a telecommunications company
- Telcom (Somalia), a telecommunications network operator
- Telcom (compander), a compression system for audio recordings
- telcom c4, a professional compander for audio noise reduction by Telefunken

== See also ==
- Telecom
- Telekom
- List of telephone operating companies
