= Young Men's Guild =

Methodist lay organization in Africa

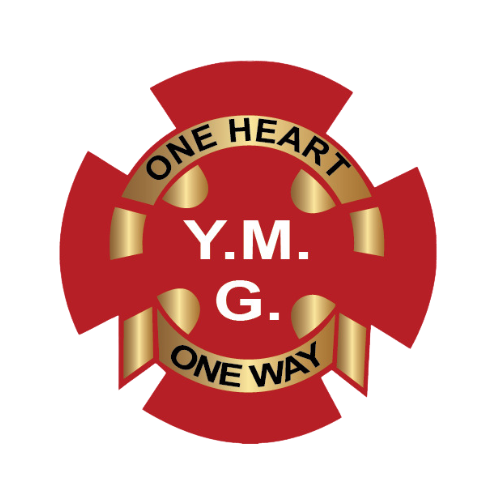
- Abbreviation: YMG
- Formation: 1912
- Founder: Methodist Church of Southern Africa, Rev Charles Pamla; Rev Gideon Baqwa; Rev James Magobodi
- Founded at: South Africa
- Type: Religious Men's organization
- Legal status: Active
- Headquarters: Johannesburg
- Region served: Southern Africa
- Official language: English, IsiXhosa, IsiZulu, Sesotho, SeTswana, Portuguese, Afrikaans,and other local languages
- Key people: Presiding Bishop, General President
- Parent organization: Methodist Church of Southern Africa
- Website: methodist.org.za

The Young Men's Guild (YMG), commonly referred to as Amadodana, is a lay organization of the Methodist Church of Southern Africa (MCSA). Focusing on spiritual development, leadership, and community service among men, the YMG has played a vital role in the religious, cultural, and social life of Methodist men in Southern Africa since the early 20th century.

== History ==
The YMG traces its origins to early initiatives in the 1900s, founded in 1912 to organize men within the MCSA for fellowship and spiritual growth.

In 1947, Rev. Z.R. Mahabane was elected as the first black president of the YMG, and he was succeeded in 1950 by Rev. P.S. Mbete. Their leadership marked a shift towards greater inclusivity and cultural representation within the organisation.

=== Uniform ===
A significant milestone in the guild's development came in 1938 with the adoption of a standardized uniform, symbolizing unity and discipline. The original uniform included a black suit, white shirt, black tie and shoes, and a purple sash. It also included the YMG badge featuring the initials "YMG" along with the motto "One Heart, One Way."

Today members of the YMG are known for wearing red waistcoats on Sunday. The waistcoats, symbolising salvation through the blood of Jesus, replaced the purple sash.

The Constitution of the Young Men's Guild specifies that a male presbyter who is a member of YMG should "wear a black shirt, instead of a white shirt and plain black tie".

== Mission and activities ==
The primary objectives of the YMG are aligned with the Methodist Church's mission to "spread scriptural holiness" and serve the community. Young Men's Guild promotes:

- Spiritual Formation: Through Bible study, preaching engagements, and prayer meetings.
- Community Engagement: Addressing social issues such as poverty, health education, and youth empowerment.
- Youth Mentorship: Encouraging moral and spiritual leadership in younger generations.
- Public Witness: Participating in advocacy, particularly around gender justice and HIV/AIDS prevention.

== Structure ==
The YMG is organised into local branches, which are grouped into circuits and districts under the governance of the MCSA. The organisation holds a triennial convention every three years, which sets direction and elects connexional leadership.

== Cultural significance ==
In addition to its religious role, the YMG contributes to preserving cultural identity among African Methodist men. Choral music—particularly the traditional male quartet style—is a hallmark of YMG gatherings. The organization also integrates African customs with Christian worship in a respectful and contextualized manner.

== See also ==
- Methodist Church of Southern Africa
- Wesley Guild
- Local Preachers' Association (LPA)
