= Methodist Church of Southern Africa =

Christian denomination

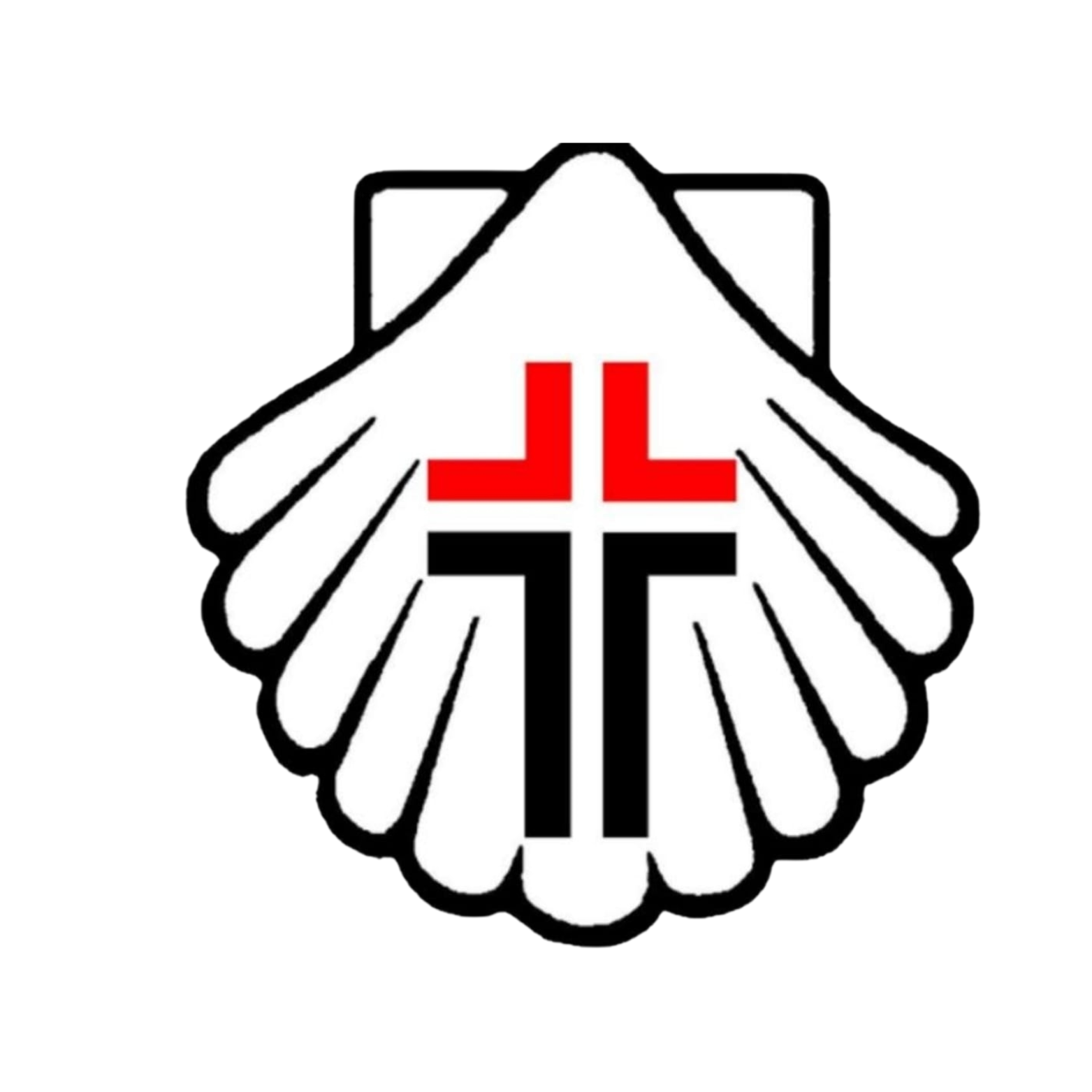
- Classification: Protestant
- Orientation: Methodism
- Polity: Connexionalism (Episcopal and Connexional)
- Presiding Bishop: Pumla Nzimande (2025– date)
- Region: Southern Africa (South Africa, Lesotho, Namibia, Botswana, Mozambique, Eswatini)
- Headquarters: Johannesburg, South Africa
- Founder: British Methodist missionaries
- Origin: 1883
- Separated from: British Methodist Church
- Members: ~3 million
- Publications: New Dimension (church magazine)
- Official website: methodist.org.za

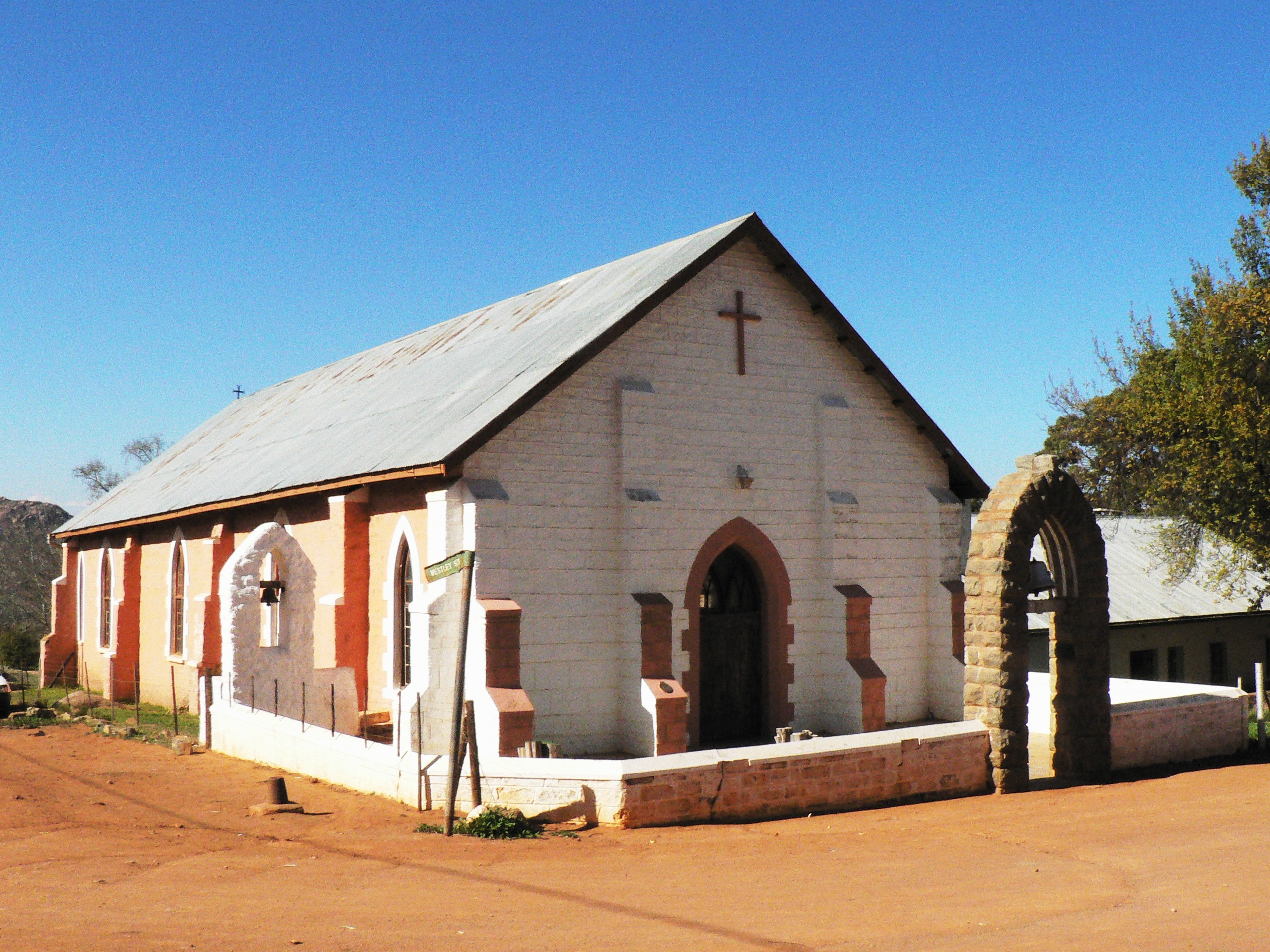
A Methodist chapel in Leliefontein, Northern Cape, South Africa.

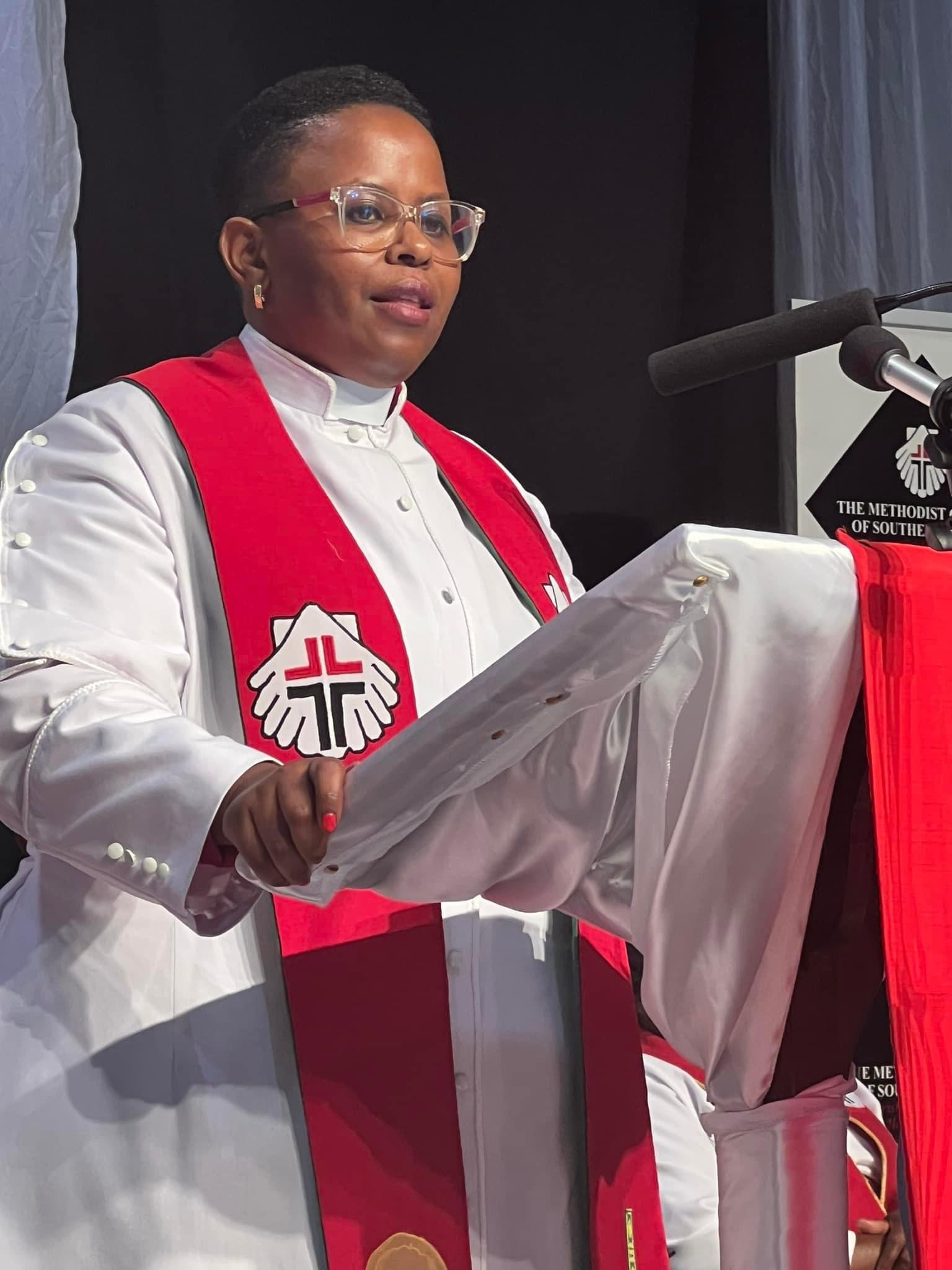
The Presiding Bishop of the Methodist Church of Southern Africa, The Rev. Pumla Nzimande

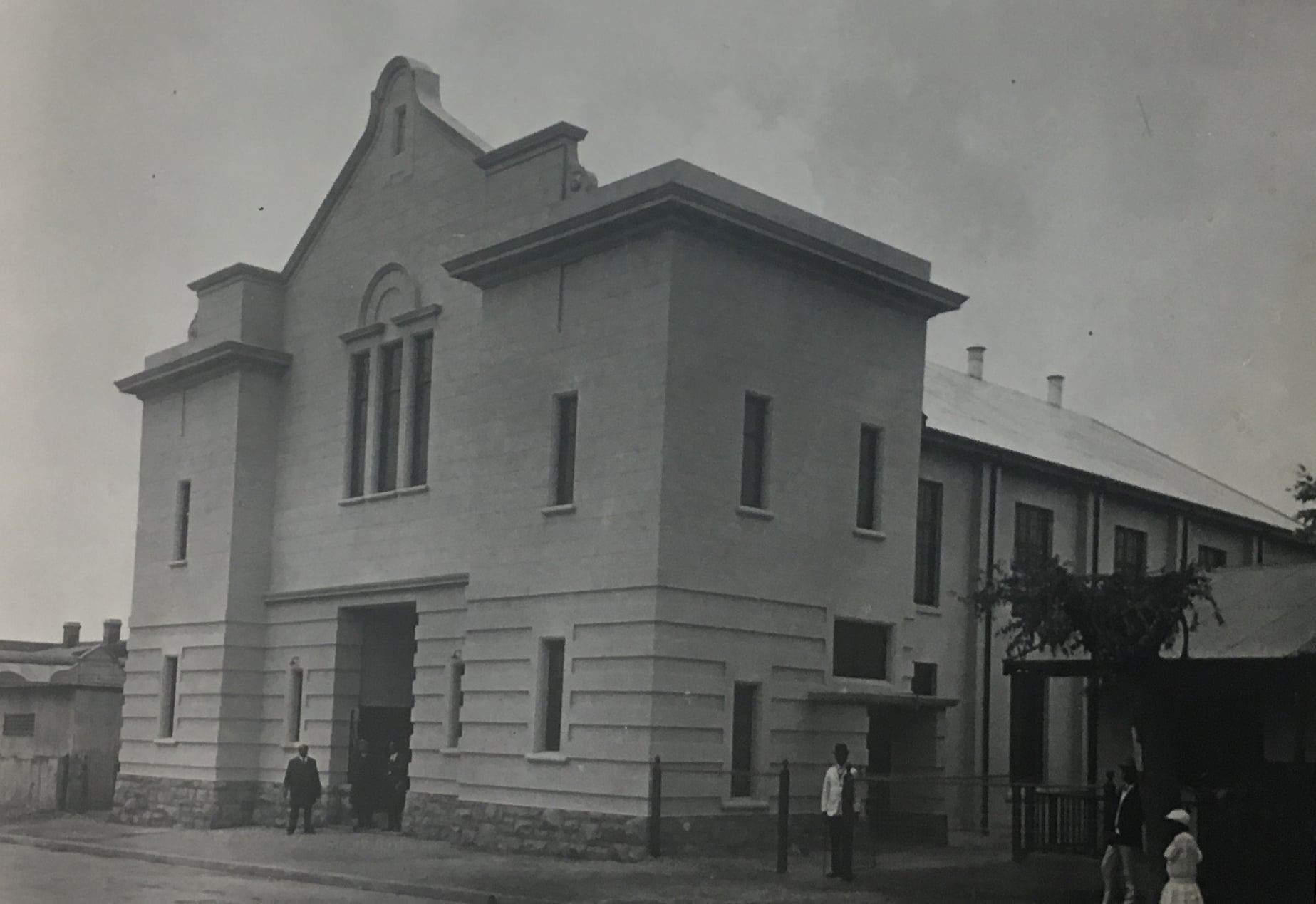
Albert Street Methodist Church, Johannesburg in 1926

The Methodist Church of Southern Africa (MCSA) is a large Wesleyan Methodist denomination, with local churches across South Africa, Namibia, Botswana, Lesotho and Eswatini, and a more limited presence in Mozambique. It is a member church of the World Methodist Council.

The church is the largest mainline Protestant denomination in South Africa – 7.3% of the South African population recorded their religious affiliation as 'Methodist' in the last national census. The denomination has around 2 – 3 million members. The denomination additionally reports 3.38 million persons within their communion.

== History ==
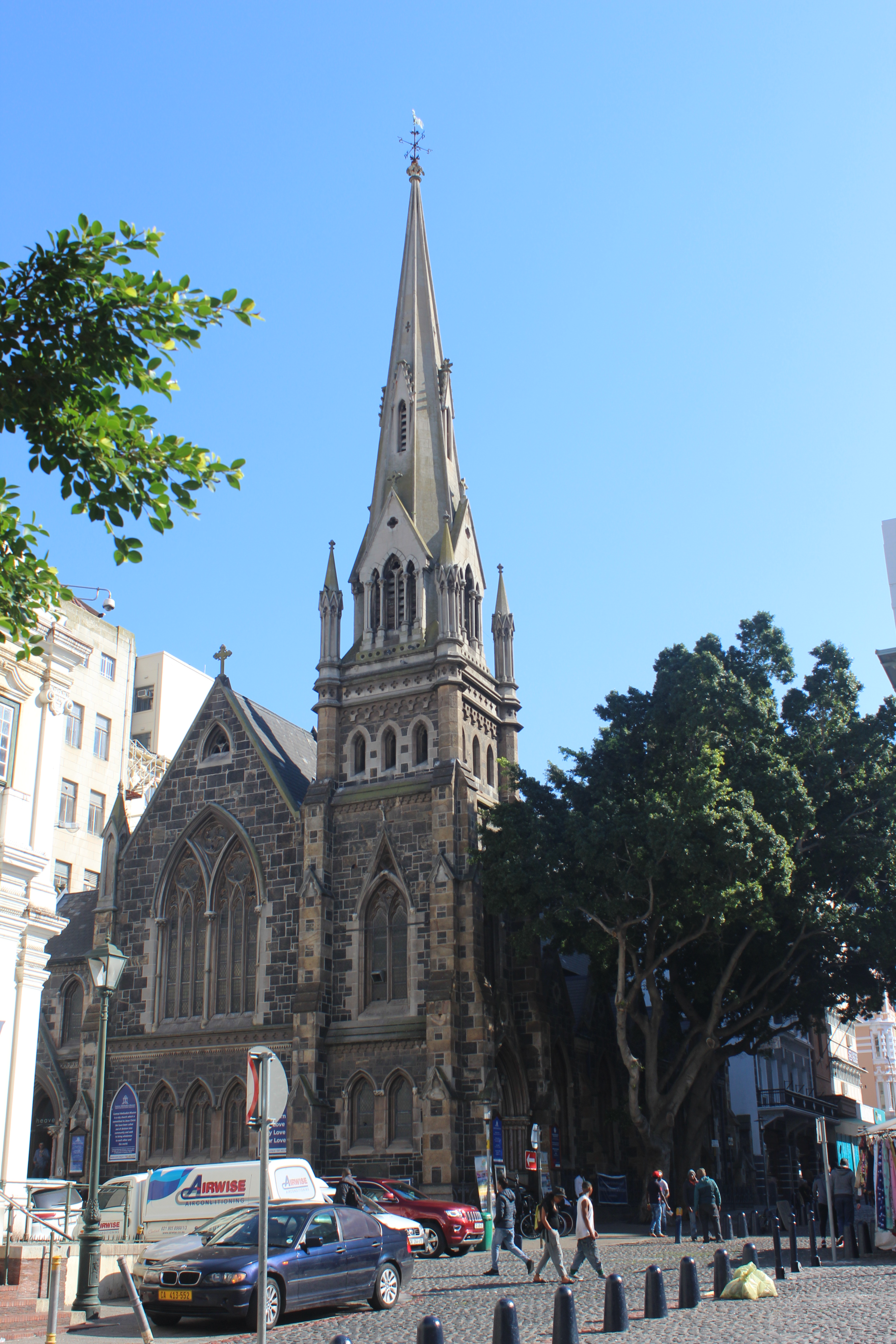
The Central Methodist Church in Cape Town is one of the oldest and best known Methodist churches in South Africa.

Methodism in Southern Africa began as a result of lay Christian work by John Irwin, an Irish soldier in the British Army who was stationed at the Cape Colony between 1795 and 1803. Irwin began to hold prayer meetings with other Methodists of the British garrison as early as 1795 in a small room rented in Cape Town. The first Methodist lay preacher at the Cape, George Middlemiss, was a soldier of the British Army's 72nd Regiment of Foot who was stationed at the Cape Colony in 1805. This foundation paved the way for missionary work by Methodist missionary societies from Britain, many of whom sent missionaries with the 1820 Settlers to the Western and Eastern Cape. Among the most notable of the early missionaries were Barnabas Shaw and William Shaw. The largest group was the Wesleyan Methodist Church, but there were a number of others that joined to form the Methodist Church of South Africa, later known as the Methodist Church of Southern Africa.

The MCSA rejected the apartheid ideology from the beginning and was a vocal critic of the Nationalist government policy throughout the apartheid era. A notable politician with Methodist roots was Nelson Mandela, who addressed the annual conference in a 1994, praising the work of the church throughout the era of minority-rule. Faced by government pressure to divide along racial lines, the 1958 conference declared its "conviction that it is the will of God for the Methodist Church that it should be one and undivided, trusting to the leading of God to bring this ideal to ultimate fruition". Six years later the first African to serve as president of conference was elected. The life of the MCSA reflects the strains and tensions of an apartheid society. In spite of this, the conference, connexional executive and synods have long since been non-racial. The idea of a one and undivided church has still to be realized at the congregational level.

== Beliefs ==
The church has allowed and supported the ordination of women in ministry. In 2019 the Methodist Church of Southern Africa inducted Purity Nomthandazo Malinga as its presiding bishop, making her the first woman to serve in the most senior role in the church. She was also the first woman consecrated as a synodal bishop in 1999.

Additionally, the denomination has opposed discrimination against members of the gay and lesbian community. In particular, the denomination opposed the anti-gay legislation being proposed in Uganda. In 2013, the denomination announced that it was in the midst of conversation regarding how to approach same-sex relationships. Currently, “Conference recognises that any decision and subsequent action on the issue of civil unions between same sex partners must await the outcome of the on-going process of engagement as specified by Conference 2005 and, in the interim, expects Methodist Ministers to continue to offer pastoral care to homosexual individuals."

In a case concerning a married lesbian pastor, the Western Cape High Court determined that "the Methodist church did not have a rule prohibiting its ministers from marrying someone of the same sex". Additionally, another court determined that the denomination "even accepts same-sex relationships (as long as such relationships are not solemnised by marriage), which means it is not at the core of the Church’s beliefs". At the Constitutional Court, the Church said that "it tolerates homosexual relationships but requires its ministers not to enter into same-sex marriages." Regarding a specific case involving a lesbian minister, the MCSA "allowed her to be in a homosexual relationship whilst being a minister, and allowed her to stay in the Church’s manse with her partner, but drew the line at recognising her same-sex marriage". In 2016, the Rev Londiwe Zulu, an openly lesbian Methodist pastor, participated in a panel on human sexuality.

=== Marriage ===
In 2020, the MCSA decided that all members, including ordained clergy, are permitted to enter into a same-gender civil union, while retaining the denomination's teaching that marriage is a union "between a man and a woman".

== Community leadership ==
Peter J. Harley, born 24 November 1931 in Acres Goodwood, Cape Town, is the long serving Local Preacher in the Cape of Good Hope District.

Our premise was that within every community there are organisations and groupings exercising an influence for good. Organisations like sports clubs, Boy Scouts, Ratepayers Associations etc, etc, including of course the Churches and Mosques as the main sources of good influence. However, through investigation we discovered that these influences for good on a community (including the churches) penetrated the community only up to a point, beyond which the influence of the church were either diminished or not felt at all. Even though it was impossible to mark on a map where the good influences diminished or stopped. It was decided rightly or wrongly to make such a marking. That mark became for us a line, a sort of FRONTIER and it was specifically beyond that frontier where we would concentrate our efforts.

— Peter J. Harley, 1969,

From 1969 to 1974, Peter Harley led youth activities in the area, which attracted as many as 450 young people and were held weekly. Known as an outspoken preacher, he delivered sermons that challenged parishioners and emphasized Methodist teaching. Harley also established Bible study groups across the Peninsula, some of which remain active. Several young people who took part in the group later became leaders in various fields. His work was recognized for its contribution to spreading the Gospel and training others to teach.

== Structure ==
The church is connexional and organised along episcopal lines. The MCSA operates today across six countries in Southern Africa under the leadership of Rev Pumla Nzimande the presiding Bishop. The organisation as a whole is referred to as a "Connexion", which in turn is made up of 15 Districts:

- Limpopo
- Cape of Good Hope
- Central
- Highveld and Eswatini
- Natal Coastal
- Natal West
- William Kama
- Clarkebury
- Namibia
- Northern Free State & Lesotho
- Kumkani Hintsa
- Moçambique
- Molopo
- Camdeboo
- Mokala Montle

Representatives from across the Connexion meet together every year at an annual Conference, as is Methodist tradition. The Conference elects a "presiding bishop", who acts as the leader of the Connexion as a whole. Each district is led by a bishop and a District Lay leader together with the District Executive, consisting of Superintendents and Circuit Stewards, with the main decision-making body at a district level being the annual synod.

At a local level are the circuits, consisting of a number of church congregations, known as "societies" (modelled on the early Methodist societies). The circuits, of which there are hundreds, are grouped into districts.

== See also ==
- List of 20th-century religious leaders
- Wesley Guild
- Young Men's Guild
- Central Methodist Mission, Johannesburg
- Albert Street Methodist Church, Johannesburg
