= EBNewsDaily =

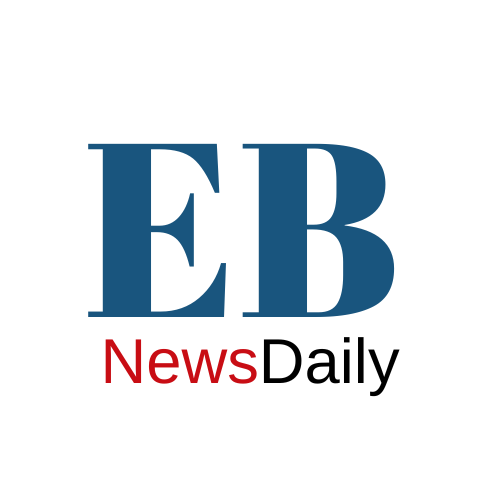
- Type: News website
- Format: Online newspaper
- Owner: Hashdon Media (Proprietary) Limited
- Editor-in-chief: Modumo Mokonoto
- Founded: 2016
- Language: English
- Headquarters: South Africa
- Website: www.ebnewsdaily.co.za

EBNewsDaily is an english-language online newspaper published in South Africa by SagloMedia. It features articles in the fields of current affairs politics, foreign affairs, business and the economy, culture, law, technology, sports, and science.

== See also ==
- Botswana Guardian
- BusinessTech
- Daily Maverick
- Daily News Botswana
- News24
