= Broad Media =

South African retail company

- Type: Private
- Industry: Mass media Journalism; Digital marketing
- Founded: 2003; 23 years ago
- Founder: Rudolph Muller
- Headquarters: Centurion, Gauteng, South Africa
- Area served: South Africa
- Key people: Rudolph Muller (CEO)
- Products: Online news Podcasts
- Website: broadmedia.co.za

Broad Media is a major South African mass media company, headquartered in Centurion, Gauteng. Founded in 2003, the company owns and operates numerous widely-read digital news sites, including Newsday, BusinessTech, TopAuto, Daily Investor, and MyBroadband. Broad Media also hosts a number of news podcasts.

As of 2026, according to the IAB South Africa, Broad Media is the country's largest online publisher. In March of that year, Broad Media had an average of 714,930 daily readers across all of its publications.

The company also provides digital marketing services including audience targeting, social media and newsletter marketing, display advertising, and event sponsorships. Broad Media also maintains a press office with South African business-to-business news website Bizcommunity.

== History ==
In 2003, Rudolph Muller founded South African consumer technology news website MyADSL, which was later renamed MyBroadband.

Over the subsequent years, numerous other news websites were launched, and Muller's company evolved into the present day Broad Media, as an umbrella for the various sites.

In August 2025, Broad Media launched a new general news website, called Newsday. Aside from political, financial, and general news, Newsday confirmed it would write about municipal infrastructure, with its journalists traveling across SA to document their findings at the local, provincial, and national level.

In March 2026, the IAB South Africa reported that Broad Media was SA's largest online publisher, with 714,930 daily readers across all of its news websites, excluding recently launched Newsday.

== Operations ==
Broad Media is entirely focused on digital news, and operates some of South Africa's most-visited news websites.

News publications owned by Broad Media include the following:

Publication	Focus	Founded	Ref
Newsday	General news	2025; 1 year ago	
BusinessTech	Business news	2008; 18 years ago	
MyBroadband	Tech news	2003; 23 years ago	
TopAuto	Automotive news	2020; 6 years ago	
Daily Investor	Financial and investment news	2022; 4 years ago	

Broad Media also maintains a press office with South African business news website Bizcommunity. The latter focuses on business-to-business content, and sells newsroom access to multiple corporate clients.

The company also hosts a number of podcasts, including Business Talk with Michael Avery, SmartMoney with Alishia Seckam, and What's Next? with Aki Anastasiou.

=== Marketing ===
As a digital marketing agency, Broad Media offers, among other services, audience targeting, social media and newsletter marketing, display advertising, and event sponsorships.

The company also hosts its own annual Digital Marketing Conference.

== See also ==
- Mass media in South Africa
- Journalism in South Africa
