= Amanda Johnstone =

Australian technology entrepreneur (born 1985 or 1986)

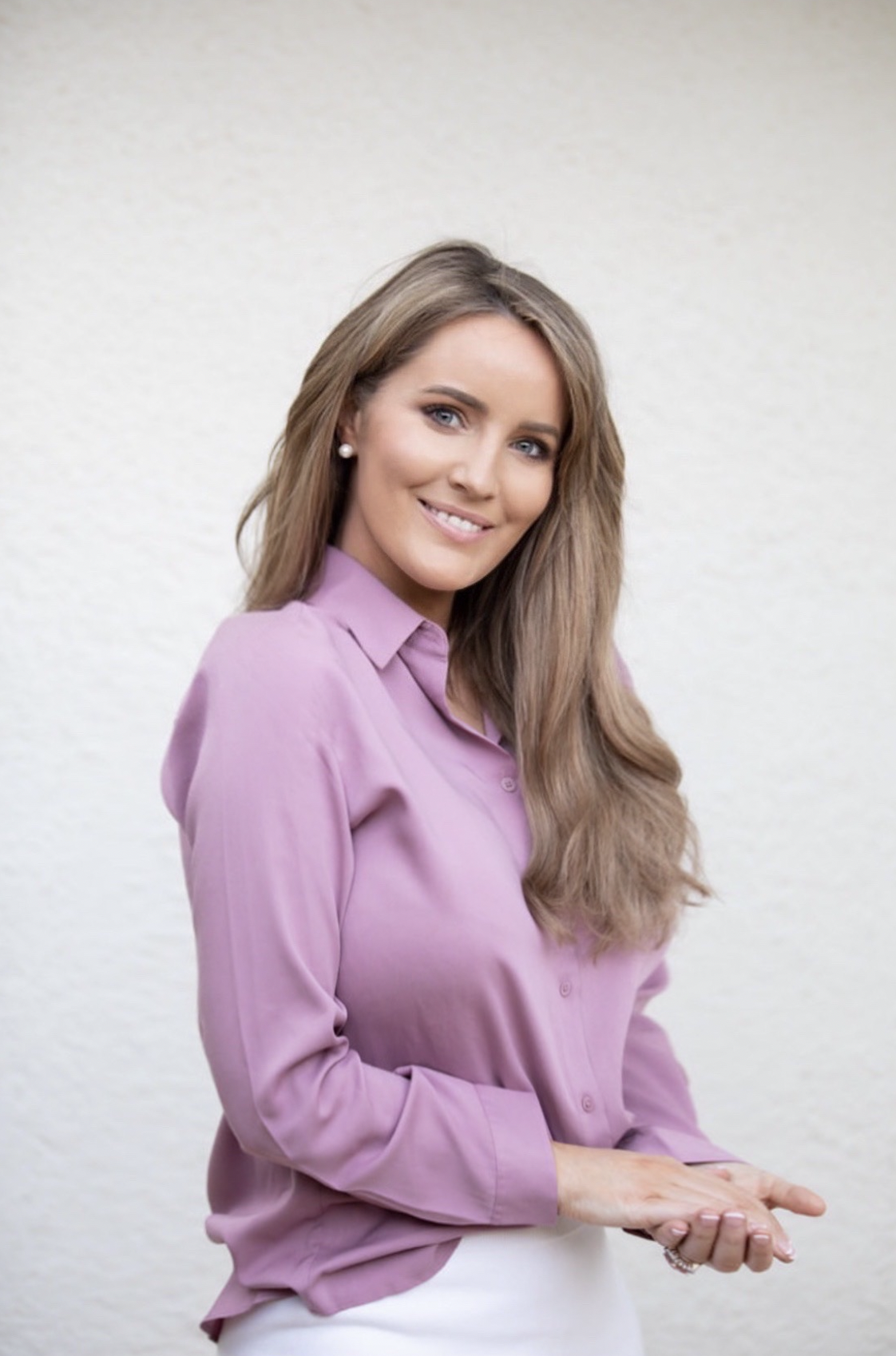
- Johnstone in 2021
- Born: Launceston, Tasmania, Australia
- Occupation: Technology entrepreneur
- Employer: Transhuman Inc.
- Awards: Time Next Generation Leader 2019, The CEO Magazine Startup Executive of the Year 2020, Top 50 Australian and New Zealand Women in Tech, GSMA Global Mobile Awards finalist - Social Inclusion
- Website: www.amandajohnstone.com

Amanda Josephine Johnstone (born 1985 or 1986) is an Australian technology entrepreneur. She founded Transhuman Inc. (also known as Social Health Innovations, Inc.), a mental health and emotion AI technology company, in 2014.

== Early life, education and career ==
Johnstone was born in Launceston, Tasmania, and attended St Thomas More's, Star of the Sea and Summerdale Primary Schools, Prospect High School and Launceston College. At 17 years old, she co-founded retail chain Sebachi, before moving into youth development as Australia's first Youth Development Officer in local government at the West Tamar Council alongside philanthropic roles in management, policy and strategy in suicide prevention at a youth suicide retreat in Tasmania. She later studied computer science at Curtin University for one semester, before dropping out after she found the course content outdated.

In 2014, Johnstone and Roy Sugarman founded Transhuman Inc., a mental health and emotion AI technology company. Johnstone's work saw Transhuman awarded second place in the Top Startups in Delaware list by The Tech Tribune in 2019.

One of Transhuman's technologies with which Johnstone has been involved in is "Be A Looper", a free mental health daily check-in app available in 87 countries. Be A Looper was one of five finalists in the 2018 Global Mobile Award Worlds by GSMA in the category for "Best Use of Mobile for Accessibility & Inclusion", a silver winner in the DrivenXDesign design awards, and highlighted in 2020 by Singularity University in the 'Technologies of the Future' series.

Johnstone is listed as an applicant on two patents specific to mental health and artificial intelligence.

== Awards and media ==
Johnstone has been recognised in a number of business and technology awards and publications, including:

- listed in the Top 50 Australian and New Zealand Women in Tech by Startup Daily in 2016;
- highlighted in the International Women in Leadership Showcase by MYOB and SmartCompany for International Women's Day;
- named a Next Generation Leader by Time and Rolex in 2019 for global leadership in suicide prevention;
- awarded Startup Executive of the Year by The CEO Magazine and Maserati.

Johnstone has been featured by Time, Thrive Global, 2GB, France 24, The Tech Tribune, Anthill, Veja The Examiner, The CEO Magazine, Billboard, The Irish News, Opovo, The Daily Telegraph, Radar Amazonico, Stigma Podcast, Cosmopolitan, Startup Daily, The Online Mom, Menzies Law, Singularity University, Fala, The Modern Woman Podcast, Belfast Telegraph, Gazeta de Buenos Ayres, The Farmer, Momentum, IWeek, ICworld, Yahoo! and Women's Day.
