= Open secret (disambiguation) =

An open secret is a concept, fact, or idea that is widely known yet officially undeclared.

- Open Secret(s) may also refer to:
- Open Secrets (South Africa), a South African social justice nonprofit
- OpenSecrets, an American nonprofit
- Open Secret, a 1948 film
- Open Secrets (short story collection), a 1994 short story collection by Alice Munro
- An Open Secret, a 2014 documentary film
- "Open Secrets", a song by Rush from the album Hold Your Fire
- Open Secret, a 1965 book by Wei Wu Wei
- Open Secret: Gay Hollywood, 1928-1998, a 1998 book by David Ehrenstein
- Open Secrets: A Memoir of Faith and Discovery, by Richard Lischer
- Open Secret: The Autobiography of the Former Director-General of MI5, the autobiography of Stella Rimington
- Open Secrets: India's Intelligence Unveiled, a memoir by an Indian intelligence operative
- Open Secrets (album), a 1988 album by Peter Kowald
