= Rosemund Handler =

South African writer

Rosemund J. Handler is a South African writer. Her novel Tsamma Season (2009) was shortlisted for the 2010 Commonwealth Writers' Prize.

Born in Johannesburg, Handler lives in Cape Town. She has written novels, short stories and poetry. She has also written for newspapers including the Daily Maverick, and the Mail & Guardian.

== Works ==
- Madlands. Johannesburg: Penguin Books, 2006.
- Katy's Kid. Johannesburg: Penguin Books, 2007.
- Tsamma Season. Johannesburg: Penguin Books, 2009.
- Us and Them. Johannesburg: Penguin, 2012.
- (with Jana van Niekerk and Natalie Railoun) For the Duration: poems. Braamfontein: Botsotso, 2015.
