= Branko Brkic =

South African publisher and former editor

Branko Brkic (born 28 April 1962) is a Serbian-born South African editor and publisher. He is currently the founder and leader of Project Kontinuum, a global initiative established in 2024.

Brkic co-founded Daily Maverick in 2009, a South African online news daily and weekly newspaper, DM168. He served as its editor-in-chief until October 2024. Under his leadership, Daily Maverick grew significantly. Prior to this, he launched several publications including Timbila in 1998, the South African National Parks magazine and Brainstorm in 2001. He was the founder, publisher and editor of Maverick magazine from 2005 to 2008 and Empire magazine from 2007 to 2008. Before immigrating to South Africa in 1991, he was a book publisher in Yugoslavia.

British magazine New African named Brkic as one of the Most Influential Africans in Media in 2014 and again in 2023. He received the Nat Nakasa Award for Media Integrity in 2018 for his role in the GuptaLeaks investigation, which exposed corruption involving the Gupta family and former South African President Jacob Zuma. This investigation also won the Global Shining Light Award in 2019 alongside Rappler, a Filipino publication founded by Nobel Prize laureate Maria Ressa.
