= Internet censorship in South Africa =

Internet censorship in South Africa is a developing topic.

== Current status ==
South Africa is not individually classified by the OpenNet Initiative, but is included in ONI's regional overview for sub-Saharan Africa.

Digital media freedom is generally respected in South Africa. Political content is partially censored, with a number of incidents.

The Freedom of the Press Report lists South Africa as being among the countries with one of the biggest declines in press freedom, dropping four places. It is now being seen as only “partly free”. Thus, suggesting that political content has been to some extent censored by the ANC government. The ANC government introduced two measures that are reminiscent of the apartheid government's diminishing of the media firstly, the ANC government has been contemplating over developing a Media Appeal Tribunal which would have the ability to sanction journalists for 'misconduct' this would suggest that these measures have little to do with protecting the national interest. Secondly, the Protection of State Information Bill, which will supply the government with expansive power to analyse almost any information involving an agent of the state as top secret, not to be reported on by journalists. Therefore, political content is partially censored in South Africa. However bloggers and content creators are not targeted for their online activities. In 2013 Freedom House rated South Africa's "Internet Freedom Status" as "Free".

In 2006, the government of South Africa began prohibiting sites hosted in the country from displaying X18 (explicitly sexual) and XXX content (including child pornography and depictions of violent sexual acts); site owners who refuse to comply are punishable under the Film and Publications Act 1996. In 2007 a South African "sex blogger" was arrested.

== Laws and regulations ==
Online media in South Africa is currently regulated under the Films and Publications Act of 1996 as amended.

South Africa participates in regional efforts to combat cybercrime. The East African Community (consisting of Kenya, Tanzania, and Uganda) and the Southern African Development Community (consisting of Malawi, Mozambique, South Africa, Zambia, and Zimbabwe) have both enacted plans to standardize cybercrime laws throughout their regions.

Under the Electronic Communications and Transactions Act of 2002 (ECTA), ISPs are required to respond to and implement take-down notices regarding illegal content such as child pornography, defamatory material, and copyright violations. Members of the Internet Service Providers Association are not liable for third-party content they do not create or select, however, they can lose this protection from liability if they do not respond to take-down requests. ISPs often err on the side of caution by taking down content to avoid litigation since there is no incentive for providers to defend the rights of the original content creator, even if they believe the take-down notice was requested in bad faith. There is no existing appeal mechanism for content creators or providers.

During May 2010 the Christian advocacy group Justice Alliance of South Africa (JASA) authored a document titled "Internet and Cell Phone Pornography Bill". Their document proposes to make it illegal for Internet service providers in South Africa to distribute or permit the distribution of pornography. The document was presented to the Deputy Home Affairs Minister Malusi Gigaba. Malusi Gigaba then asked the Law Reform Commission whether a change in the law was possible.

In July 2010 Malusi Gigaba then called for the fast-tracking of new regulation that would compel Internet service providers to filter content provided to users to ensure it does not contain any pornography.

In September 2012, the Constitutional Court upheld a ruling that prescreening publications (including Internet content) as required by the 2009 amendments to the Films and Publications Act of 1996 was an unconstitutional limitation on freedom of expression.

In September 2013 President Jacob Zuma refused to sign the Protection of State Information Bill (POSIB) into law and instead sent it back to the National Assembly for reconsideration. The bill provided for heavy penalties for journalists who reveal "State secrets", including a prison sentence of up to 25 years for "divulging classified information". The bill was criticized because of the danger it posed to investigative journalism.

In November 2013, the Protection of Personal Information Act was signed into law, enacting measures to protect users’ online security, privacy, and data. No law ensuring the constitutional right to privacy existed previous to POPI, which allows an individual to bring civil claims against those who contravene the act. 35 Penalties for contravening the law are stiff, including prison terms and fines of up to ZAR 10 million (about $600,000).

- Sections 2 to 38; sections 55 to 109; section 111, and section 114 (1), (2) and (3) shall commence on 1 July 2020
- Sections 110 and 114(4) shall commence on 30 June 2021
- 1 July 2021: Section 58(2) of the Act shall commence on this date. Refer to GG44383
- 1 February 2022: Section 58(2) of the Act shall become applicable to processing referred to in section 57 of the Act. Refer to GG 44782

== See also ==
- Protection of Information Bill
- Media Appeals Tribunal
