= The South African =

English-language South African daily online newspaper

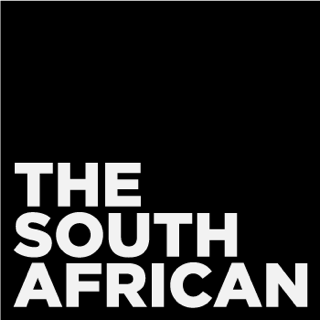
- Type: Daily newspaper
- Format: Online newspaper
- Owner: Blue Sky Publications Ltd (UK)
- Publisher: Blue Sky Publications Ltd (UK) & Blue Sky Publications (Pty) Ltd (South Africa)
- Founded: March 2003
- Language: English
- Country: South Africa
- Website: www.thesouthafrican.com

The South African is an English-language South African online news publication created in March 2003 by the multinational media company, Blue Sky Publications, and it operates as an online news and lifestyle publication with offices in South Africa and the United Kingdom.

The publication started as a London-based broadsheet newspaper aimed at providing news for South Africans living in London. It was available in a weekly tabloid format and distributed at the entrances of London Tube stations until June 2015 when it became an entirely online news source for South African news.

== History ==
=== 2003–2015: print and online years ===
News published online but also in a weekly print format newspaper distributed at train station entrances in London.

=== 2015–present: online only ===
The last print issue was printed on 15 June 2015, as readers were by then mostly based in South Africa and readership growth had declined after a change in SA to UK immigration policies. The publication's focus hence pivoted to readers in South Africa.

== Awards ==
In 2018, it won an IAB Bookmark Award for Mobile Publications.

== See also ==
- Media of South Africa
- List of South African media
- List of newspapers in South Africa
- South African Audience Research Foundation (SAARF)
