= Malinga =

Malinga may refer to:

- Alex Malinga, Ugandan marathon runner
- Lasith Malinga, Sri Lankan cricketer
- Purity Nomthandazo Malinga, South African bishop
- Thulani Malinga, South African boxer
- Vula Malinga, British soprano
- Malinga Bandara, Sri Lankan cricketer
- Malinga, a town in Louetsi-Bibaka Department of Ngounié Province, Gabon
