= Albert Street Methodist Church, Johannesburg =

Coordinates: 26.2086°S 28.0466°E

Albert Street Methodist Church
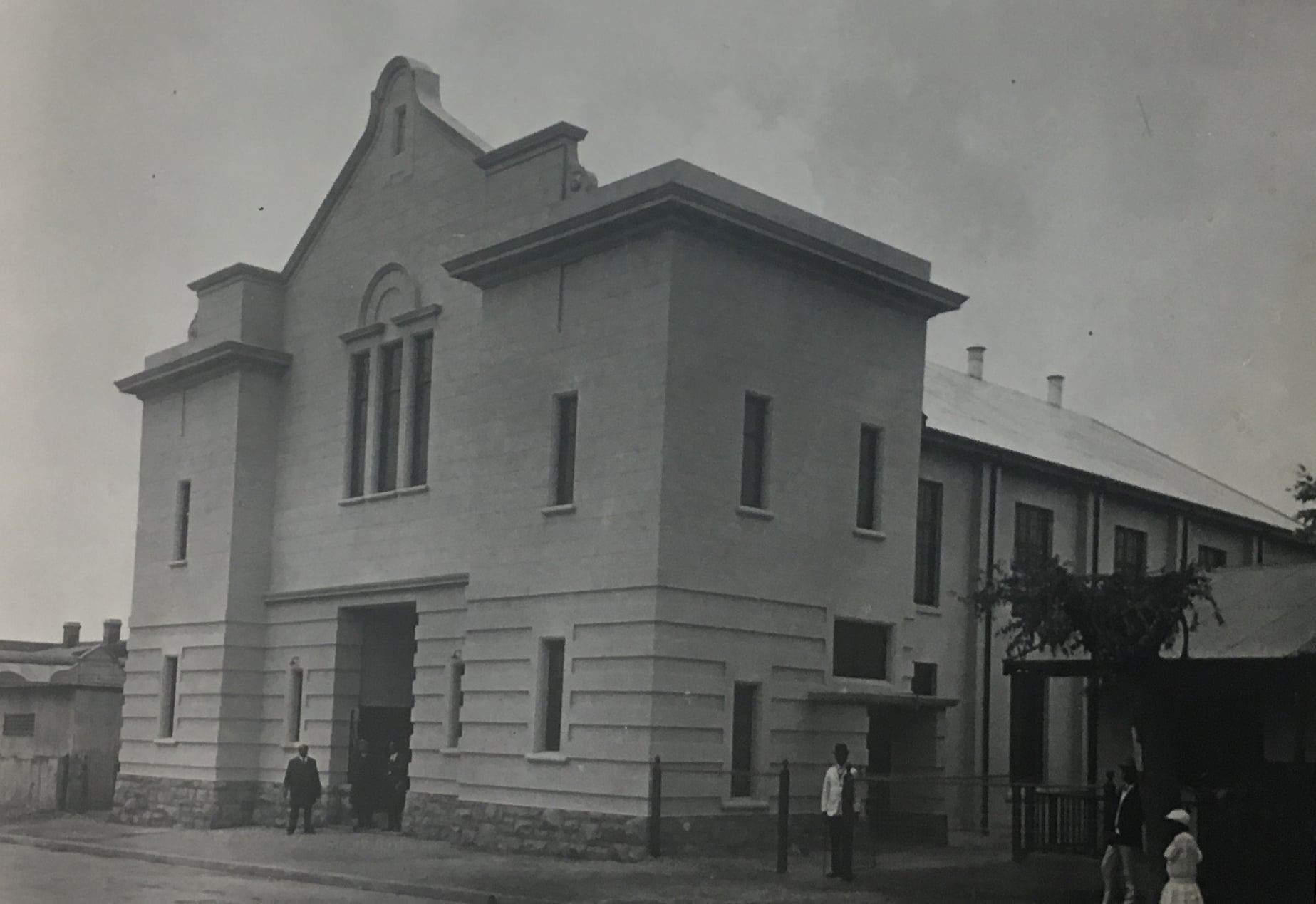
- The church photographed in 1926
- Albert Street Methodist Church
- Location: Corner of Albert and Kruis Streets, Johannesburg, South Africa
- Country: South Africa
- Denomination: Methodist Church of Southern Africa

History
- Status: Active
- Founded: 1893
- Founder: Wesleyan Native Mission

Architecture
- Completed: 1915

Albert Street Methodist Church is a historic Methodist church located at the corner of Albert and Kruis Streets in the inner city of Johannesburg, South Africa. Formerly known as the Wesleyan Native Mission, the church has served the African Methodist community in Johannesburg since the late 19th century. It is affiliated with the Methodist Church of Southern Africa (MCSA).

== History ==
The original foundation stone for the church was laid on 9 April 1893. At its inception, the church functioned primarily as a mission station for Black congregants during a period of colonial segregation in the Transvaal. The first structure was a corrugated iron-clad building with a wooden floor and elevated pulpit, characteristic of early mission church architecture in Southern Africa.

Due to growth in the congregation, a new church building was constructed in 1915. The foundation stone for the new structure was laid on 31 October 1915, in a ceremony officiated by Louis Botha, the first Prime Minister of the Union of South Africa, alongside Reverend G. Weavend. This event underscored the church's significance within both the religious and civic life of the city.

== Apartheid era ==
In 1958, during the apartheid era, the South African government ordered the closure of Albert Street Methodist Church, designating it a "black spot"—a term used to describe areas occupied by Black South Africans that were targeted for forced removals under racially discriminatory urban planning laws. The church was later reopened and continued its ministry, providing spiritual and community support to residents of inner-city Johannesburg.

== Refugee centre and community role ==
In the 2000s, particularly during the outbreak of xenophobic violence in South Africa and a large influx of migrants from Zimbabwe, Albert Street Methodist Church played a crucial role in offering humanitarian support. Alongside the neighbouring Central Methodist Church, Johannesburg, under the leadership of Bishop Paul Verryn, the church became a refuge for hundreds of displaced people. During this period, it operated not only as a shelter but also as a school and a library, helping to provide education and literacy support to refugees and children in the area.

== Architecture ==
The church retains several of its original architectural features, including wooden flooring, a corrugated iron-clad structure, and a high-rise pulpit. These features, along with its historical associations, contribute to the building’s cultural and architectural significance. However, the church is not formally listed as a heritage site.

== Present day ==
Today, Albert Street Methodist Church remains an active place of worship. It continues to serve a diverse and dynamic congregation and stands as a symbol of faith, resilience, and historical continuity in Johannesburg. The church's enduring presence reflects the legacy of Methodist mission work among Black South Africans during both the colonial and apartheid eras, as well as its compassionate outreach to migrants and the urban poor in the post-apartheid era.

== See also ==
- Methodist Church of Southern Africa
- Religion in South Africa
- History of Johannesburg
- Xenophobia in South Africa
- Paul Verryn
