= BusinessTech =

South African business news website

- Website type: Business news
- Available in: English
- Owner: Broad Media
- Editor: Quinton Bronkhorst
- Website: businesstech.co.za/news
- Commercial: Yes
- Launched: 2008; 18 years ago
- Current status: Active

BusinessTech is South Africa's largest business news website. Launched in 2008, it is owned by mass media house Broad Media. The publication's Editor is Quinton Bronkhorst. It features articles on finance, technology, industry, investing, and marketing topics. Its headquarters is located in Centurion, Gauteng, South Africa. Competitors in the business news segment include TimesLIVE, MoneyWeb, and News24.

BusinessTech is the top business news website in South Africa, with a monthly readership of over 6 million.

== Conferences ==
BusinessTech hosts multiple annual conferences – with its two flagship events the BusinessTech digital banking Conference, and the BusinessTech Online FinTech Conference. The publication's conferences have grown to become the biggest conferences in South Africa.

== See also ==
- MyBroadband
- News24
- Daily Maverick
- TimesLIVE
