= SA Sports Illustrated =

South African sports magazine

SA Sports Illustrated was a South African sports magazine published in print monthly.

== History and profile ==
Founded by Richard Whittingdale in 1985 as owner, founder and editor. The Swimwear edition also founded in 1985 by Richard.

Richard ran it until 1988.

Richard was co-founder of SA Cricketer and SA Rugby magazines from 1982 until they were folded into SA Sports Illustrated.

The popular South African sporting periodical was founded in 1986. It was edited variously by Robert Houwing, Peter Davies, Steve Smith and Brendan Cooper, and focused primarily on cricket, rugby and football, South Africa's top three sporting codes.

The Swimwear edition was a popular brand extension and featured some of South Africa's top female models.

In December 2012, it was reported that the owner, Media24, had decided to close the magazine as a result of declining revenue and circulation figures. The last issue appeared in February 2013.
