= ITWeb =

ITWebthe
- Status: Active
- Founded: 1996; 29 years ago
- Country of origin: South Africa
- Publication types: Magazines
- Imprints: Brainstorm iWeek; Digital Life; DefenceWeb
- No. of employees: >100
- Official website: itweb.co.za

ITWeb is a business technology media company based in Johannesburg, South Africa, with media products and services that include online, print and events. ITWeb operates a daily technology news portal, publishes a monthly print magazine, Brainstorm, and hosts conferences, webinars and round table discussions.

The ITWeb site publishes news, research and analysis about the South African IT and telecoms markets. Its audience are IT professionals, industry analysts, investors, vendors and marketers of IT products and services, as well as C-level executives who make technology investment decisions.

The company employs over 5 people in offices in Rivonia Johannesburg, Gauteng.

== History and operations ==
ITWeb was founded by Jovan Regasek, journalist and publisher from Belgrade, Serbia (former Yugoslavia) in 1996.
