= Prestige Bulletin =

Prestige Bulletin is a financial journal published monthly in South Africa since 1989.

It covers investments, financial markets, personal finance, tax planning, and entrepreneurship. Prestige Bulletin aims to be objective and does not promote specific investment products or accept advertising.
