= Telcom (Ireland) =

Irish Telecommunications Company

- Company type: Private limited company
- Industry: Telecoms
- Founded: 1999
- Headquarters: Nutgrove Office Park; Rathfarnham; Dublin
- Area served: Ireland
- Key people: Liam Tully (Managing Director)
- Products: Fixed-line telephony; VOIP; Broadband internet; Fibre-powered connections; Telecommunications services; Telecommunications equipment
- Website: Official website

Telcom is an Irish telecommunications company operating in the business-to-business market. They offer communications services, are a ComReg registered carrier for voice and data and operate as an independent Internet Service Provider. Telcom is a registered member of the Internet Neutral Exchange (INEX).

== History ==
Telcom was founded in 1999 in Dublin by Liam Tully. It initially provided phone systems for offices, before expanding to include data and internet services.

In 2015 Telcom invested €1 million into new network infrastructure, creating a 10Gb core network. This allowed them to expand their business fibre broadband service, offering speeds of up to 1 Gb/s to customers with zero contention rates. This upgrade was completed as a partnership between Telcom and Agile Networks, another Dublin-based company.

== See also ==
- Telecommunications in the Republic of Ireland
- Internet in the Republic of Ireland
