= African Pilot =

South African magazine

African Pilot is a monthly general aviation magazine published in South Africa since 2001.

In 2010 the magazine launched a free electronic version . The company also has a weekly newsletter which goes out globally. Audit

The last audited sales figure were in the region of 7000 paper copies and 6754 electronic copies. Although not certified by ABC anymore they claim to have similar figures still.

The African Pilot offices are located in Midrand in the Johannesburg region. Presently the company employs nine people and has a further 15 or so freelance writers and photographers.
