= Media Appeals Tribunal =

The Media Appeals Tribunal was proposed in an African National Congress (ANC) 2010 discussion paper, which, in turn, builds on a resolution adopted at the party's 2007 National Conference in Polokwane. A basic premise of the resolution is the idea that freedom of the press is not an absolute right, but must be balanced against individuals' rights to privacy and human dignity.

The discussion paper argues that the current avenues individuals can pursue in order to right a media wrong, litigation and complaining to the Press Ombudsman, are inadequate; litigation is expensive (and thus inaccessible to a large number of South Africans) and long-winded, whereas the Press Ombudsman's background in media is seen as resulting in "(...) an inherent bias towards the media with all interpretations favourable to the institution (...)". The establishment of a Media Appeals Tribunal accountable to Parliament is thought to be a remedy to this situation.

== Criticism ==
While some critics of the proposal, notably Guy Berger, have conceded that the South African press has a range of shortcomings, the idea of a Media Appeals Tribunal is still dismissed as "political interference". The point has been made that while the Press Ombudsman might have a press background, half of the Press Council is composed of members of the public, and the final level of appeal within the self-regulatory system is presided over by a retired judge.

== Progress ==
Although the two tend to be conflated in contemporary debates over press freedom in South Africa, the resolution to establish a Media Appeals Tribunal has not been tabled in Parliament, and is independent from the Protection of State Information Bill.

In January 2011, President Jacob Zuma called on the South African media to "speed up its transformation processes", but did not mention the Media Appeals Tribunal specifically. The ANC confirmed, through its spokesperson Jackson Mthembu, that it is not going to pursue the matter until further notice, stating "We will give you the space to transform yourself and then see where it takes us." He clarified that if the Press Council imposed measures that "discourage irresponsible reporting" the ANC would retain the current model of media self-regulation.
