= Nomad Africa Magazine =

Pan-African quarterly magazine

Nomad Africa
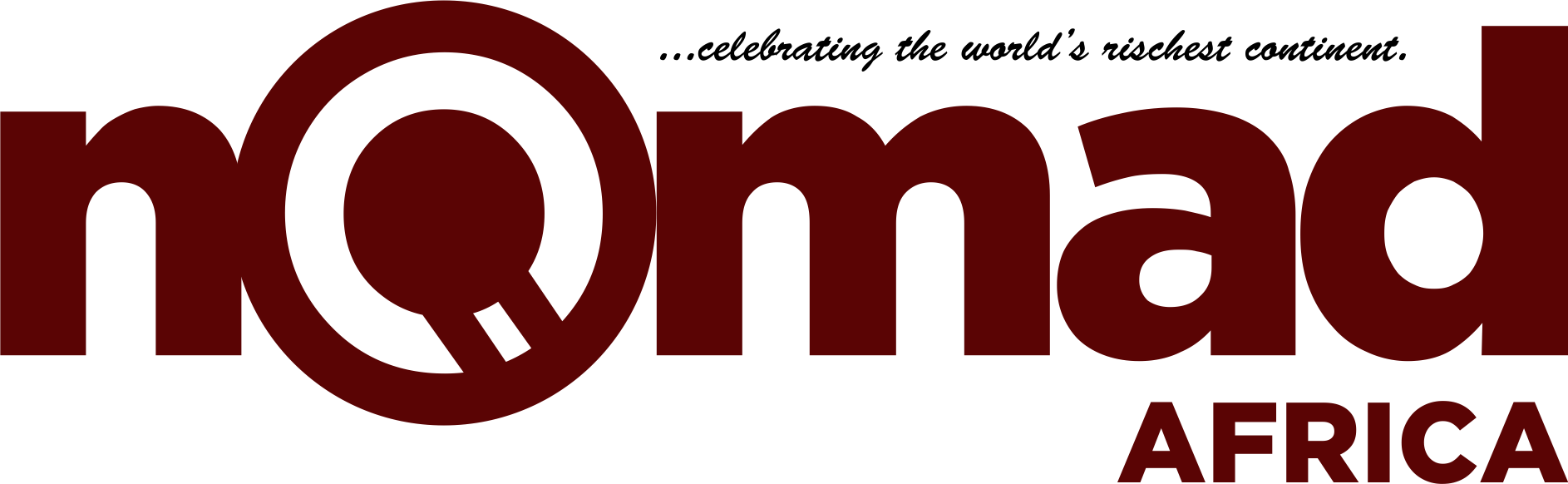
- Managing Editor: Jomarie Kromberg
- Executive Editor: Heather Balouza
- Feature Editor: Babara Wood
- Associate Publisher: Dieter Göttert
- Former editors: Miriro Matema
- Staff writers: Martin Chemhere, Nosihle Zulu, Siphokazi Vuso, Afolabi Gambari, Lerato Serumola
- Categories: Travel and Tourism
- Frequency: Quarterly
- Publisher: John Oluwatosin Akinribido
- First issue: 1 January 2015; 11 years ago
- Company: 2414 Publishing (Pty) Limited
- Country: South Africa
- Website: www.nomadafricamag.com

Nomad Africa is a Pan-African tourism magazine, published quarterly from Johannesburg, South Africa, by 2414 Publishing (Pty) Limited a subsidiary of 2414 Media Group. The Nomad Africa Project was launched in January 2012 and its reception was positive, resulting in an increased demand in Africa as well as internationally, so that distribution for the November 2015 printed edition already exceeded 65,000. 2414 Publishing (Pty) Ltd took over the Nomad Africa brand in 2015. Since 2015 up until the present moment, 2414 Publishing has grown the brand to become a high end retail magazine in Southern Africa as well as being distributed in selected African countries and globally in VIP lounges of international airports, business class sections of selected airlines, Four and Five Star Hotels. 2414 Publishing (Pty) Ltd encompasses associated media and digital platforms under its publishing umbrella.

== Content and style ==
Nomad Africa magazine celebrates life on the African continent. The magazine consists of topics related to tourism, travel, culture and heritage.

The magazine's content places special emphasis on the fast growth paths in industry, the myriad investment and developmental opportunities, innovations in commerce and technology, African history, business, tourism, special destinations, culture and arts.

== Circulation ==
Nomad Africa magazine is circulated globally in print (both retail & complimentary distributions) and digitally across major digital platforms (subscription based). The magazine is distributed in selected retail outlets in South Africa (Woolworths, Exclusive Books & SuperSpar), United States (Barnes & Noble Stores, NJ Penn Stores and Mader News Stores) and Canada (Indigo Books, Globe Mags & Bolen Books). Complimentary copies of the print magazine are available in South Africa, United Kingdom, United States and Canada at selected VIP lounges of international airports, business class sections of selected airlines, four and five star hotels, spas and casinos as well as cruise liners sailing around the coasts.

== Partnerships and Collaborations ==
In August 2017, Nomad Africa partnered with London-based World Travel Awards. World Travel Awards Founder and President, Graham Cooke, announced Nomad Africa as an official media partner for World Travel Awards (WTA) Africa Gala Ceremony which took place in Rwanda's capital, Kigali.

== Management and Ownership ==
2414 Publishing (Pty) Ltd is owned by John Oluwatosin Akinribido and Dieter Göttert with Akinribido as the major shareholder. Both shareholders play an active role in the management of the holding company.

Akinribido is an influential Thought Leader within the African tourism sector who periodically view his opinions on topical issues across the continent. In July 2026, at the climax of xenophobic attacks in South Africa, he published his opinion in several newspapers across the African continent specifically in South Africa, Nigeriaand Ghana,emphasising that South Africa must confront the structural causes of xenophobia: unemployment, inequality, housing scarcity, while refusing, firmly and consistently, to allow these grievances to manifest as violence against fellow Africans and that leaders must lead and communities must be held accountable.

== NomadRadio and NomadTV ==
In January 2018, Nomad Africa added a podcast broadcast platform. Nomad Online Radio kick started with its flagship show ‘Discover Africa’ hosted by veteran broadcaster David Batzofin - a travel writer, blogger and photographer. NomadTV is the online digital television division of the Nomad Africa project. It regularly features interviews with representatives of government and tourism boards across the continent of Africa.
