= Protection of State Information Bill =

Parliament of South Africa
- Long title: Bill to provide for the protection of sensitive state information; to provide for a system of classification, reclassification and declassification of state information; to provide for the protection of certain valuable state information against alteration, destruction or loss or unlawful disclosure; to regulate the manner in which state information may be protected; to repeal the Protection of Information Act, 1982 (Act No. 84 of 1982); and to provide for matters connected therewith.
- Passed by: National Assembly
- Passed: 25 April 2013
- Enacted: 22 November 2011
- Passed by: National Council of Provinces
- Passed: 29 November 2012

Initiating chamber: National Assembly
- Bill citation: B6D—2010

Summary
- Returned by President to National Assembly for reconsideration (September 2013)

The South African Protection of State Information Bill, formerly named the Protection of Information Bill and commonly referred to as the Secrecy Bill, is a highly controversial piece of proposed legislation which aims to regulate the, protection and dissemination of state information, weighing state interests up against transparency and freedom of expression. It will replace the Protection of State Information Act, 1982, which currently regulates these issues.

While critics of the bill have broadly accepted the need to replace the 1982 Act, they argue that the new Bill does not correctly balance these competing principles, and point to a number of provisions that undermine the right to access information and the rights of whistleblowers and journalists.

The Bill was passed by the National Assembly on 22 November 2011. It was passed with amendments by the National Council of Provinces on 29 November 2012, and the amended bill was approved by the National Assembly on 25 April 2013. In September 2013 President Jacob Zuma refused to sign the Bill into law and instead sent it back to the National Assembly for reconsideration.

== New bill ==
In the mid-2000s, a parliamentary review process to replace apartheid laws included a planned repeal and replacement of the Protection of Information Act 84 of 1982.

Critics of the new bill, most notably led by a civil society coalition called the Right2Know Campaign, have broadly accepted the need to replace the 1982 Act, human rights activists, legal experts, opposition parties and a wide range of civil society bodies argued that the Bill does not correctly balance these competing principles, and point to a number of provisions that undermine the right to access information and the rights of whistleblowers and journalists.

Of particular concern are the severe penalties for leaking documents, which entail jail terms of up to 25 years. They also highlight the need for a "public interest defence" exempting from prosecution individuals in possession of classified documents that reveal state ineptitude or corruption, or could otherwise be said to contain information vital to the interests of the public. Advocates of the bill dispute the need for such a defence, stating that the current draft of the proposed legislation which criminalises classification of documents revealing "corruption, malfeasance or wrongdoing by the State" with jail terms of up to 15 years prevents the need for such a defence as no such information will be classified.

Following the re-introduction of the Bill in 2010, significant concerns were raised by civil society and media organisations about the 'draconian' nature of the new bill. The concerns as submitted in various documents focused on:

- overly broad definitions of "national interest", "security", "national security" and "state security"
- the classification of commercial information held by the state and the ability to classify such information not held by the state;
- the classification of commercial information as 'top secret', 'secret' and 'confidential' based on hypothetical or speculative harm to the 'national interest' and
- the criminalisation of activities which would undermine investigative journalism

Specifically, the definition of 'national interest' as a basis to classify information was considered too broad, including "All matters relating to the advancement of the public good; the pursuit of justice, democracy, economic growth, free trade, a stable monetary system and sound international relations; and security from all forms of crime". Various organisations collectively known as "The Right2Know" Campaign, listed seven major demands for a revised legislation.

Although the two are often conflated in contemporary debates over press freedom in South Africa, the proposed Media Appeals Tribunal is not mentioned in the Protection of State Information Bill.

=== Principal changes to the working draft ===
Upon the establishment of an ad hoc committee in 2010 to address the concerns raised by South Africans opposed to the bill, the following major revisions to the bill were enacted:

1. The chapter providing protection against disclosure and classification of two categories of information- 'sensitive information' and 'commercial information' was deleted.
2. Removal of this chapter led to exclusion of the possibility of classifying materials in the "national interest", a particularly widely defined and controversial aspect of the bill.
3. This chapter's removal also entailed narrowing the legislation to official secrets held by the chief state intelligence agencies alone without extending to all organs of the state as was initially proposed.
4. The threshold for classification has been changed to permit classification based only on demonstrable and not speculative harm to national security. A Classification Review Committee to oversee classification of documents has been proposed.
5. The legal requirement that requests for declassification be responded to within 14 days of receiving the request (known as the "PAIA over-ride").

== Remaining areas of controversy ==
1. Espionage and hostile activity offences which punish the communication of classified information which the person "knows or ought reasonably to have known would directly or indirectly benefit" a foreign state or non-state actor or prejudice national security. These offences are punishable by jail terms ranging from three years to 25 years, and are considered by critics to be so broad that they could apply to legitimate whistleblowers and anyone else exposing classified information in the public domain.
2. Intentionally accessing classified information may result in a 25-year jail term
3. Disclosing classified information, unless protected under the Protected Disclosures Act or the Companies Act is punishable by a fine or maximum jail term of five years. However these disclosures are regarded as applying to a limited category of recipients such as the public protector and the Companies tribunal, therefore not extending as a defence to investigative journalists, community leaders, trade unions or NGOs for instance, to publish information to the public at large.
4. Failing to report possession of and to return to a classified document may result in a fine or maximum five-year prison sentence;
5. The disclosure and retention of classified information that relates to intelligence agencies is punishable by imprisonment of up to 15 years.

== Criticism ==
Critics of the bill have included a wide range of public organisations including: the Right2Know campaign (a coalition of nearly 400 civil society organisations and community groups); COSATU; opposition political parties of South Africa; SANEF (South Africa National Editors' Forum); the Nelson Mandela Foundation, as well as international advocacy organisations such as Committee for the Protection of Journalists and Human Rights Watch. The critics of the bill joined in a march on parliament on 17 September 2011 prompting the ruling African National Congress party's chief whip to remove the bill from the parliamentary programme on 19 September for "further public consultation". However, no public consultations appear to have taken place the few closed-door roadshows that did take place were roundly criticised. The Senate of the University of the Witwatersrand issued a statement identifying how the bill would pose "deep threats to fundamental principles" enshrined in the constitution, impacting democracy in South Africa by undermining access to information and freedom of speech.

=== ANC response to continued criticism ===
The South African ruling party African National Congress (ANC) has dismissed much of the criticism of the revised draft of the bill. It views the legislation as a necessary reform of apartheid era laws governing the protection of information. According to Minister Cwele, the bill introduces protection of valuable information by all organs of state; prevents against the danger of espionage, balances secrecy and openness through a system of declassification of information on a periodic 10 and 20-year basis as well as through the establishment of an independent Classification Review Panel.

ANC ad hoc committee member on the Protection of State Information Bill, Lluwelyn Landers, quoting Professor Kobus van Rooyen SC's 2011 Percy Qhoboza lecture argued against the possibility of the bill's unconstitutionality on account of the lack of a public interest defence. According to Llanders (and van Rooyen), in the absence of a public interest defence, access to a classified document could be expedited under a strengthened "PAIA over-ride" provision that is part of the Bill on the basis of the same public interest. The ANC have further criticised the "vitriol, vilification, name-calling... and blatant lies' regarding the bill" and in a speech to Parliament Minister of State Security Siyabonga Cwele went as far as accusing the Bill's critics of being local proxies for foreign spies. Additionally, the ANC believe that the consequences of disclosing classified information where a 'public interest' fails would leave the state with "no recourse".

== Passage by National Assembly and National Council of Provinces, referral back by President ==
The Bill was passed by the National Assembly on 22 November 2011 by a total of 229 yes votes to 107 no votes and 2 abstentions. All opposition parties urged the ruling ANC to vote against the Bill. Two members of the ANC, Ben Turok and Gloria Borman abstained from voting on the bill urging 'further consideration' before finalising the legislation. The two members have been referred to ANC's disciplinary committee.

The Bill was passed with amendments by the National Council of Provinces on 29 November 2012 by 34 votes to 16, and the amended bill was approved by the National Assembly on 25 April 2013 by 189 votes to 74 with one abstention.

In September 2013 President Jacob Zuma refused to sign the Bill into law and instead sent it back to the National Assembly for reconsideration.

== See also ==
- Media of South Africa (section Press freedom)
- National Key Points Act, 1980
- Political Repression in Post-Apartheid South Africa
