= Wiel Motor Magazine =

Wiel Motortydskrif was South Africa's oldest - and the world's only - motoring magazine in the Afrikaans language.

== History ==
The magazine was established in 1978 by publishing-editor Jannie Herbst, mainly to serve the racing fraternity with results and motoring news. The title was sold several times to publishing houses and was published by Ramsey Son and Parker alongside Car Magazine, South Africa's oldest motoring magazine in English, until the demise of Wiel in February 2011.

== Neologism machine ==
Writing about technical issues in Afrikaans, the world's youngest language, presented motoring journalists at Wiel magazine with unique challenges and opportunities to debate and create new Afrikaans words that capture technical processes. Many of these words are perpetuated amongst the Afrikaans speaking populace, and also used on the popular Afrikaans Motoring Show, La't Wiel.

== Editors ==
- Francois Rabe, from 2008 until its closure in Feb 2011.
- Ferdi de Vos, who steered the magazine from niche ownership to 2008.
- Danie Botha, who managed the magazine in its transition phase during the Johnnic (later Avusa Media) years and went on to co-create the La't Wiel television programme.
- Paul Shippey
- Teddy Knoetze
- Johann van Loggerenberg
- Jannie Herbst, founder and publisher of Wiel and now editor of Leisure Wheels.

== Talent incubator ==
Wiel magazine was a talent incubator for print journalists. The list includes:

- Alwyn Viljoen, motoring show co-presenter with Hennie Maas on Radio Sonder Grense and trucking show host on Radio 2000 and Radio Sonder Grense.
- Craig Smith, lay-out artist at Wiel who created the Quickpic national photo storage and retrieval server for the motoring magazine industry.
- Elza Thiart, motor and quad bike radio race reporter.
- Waldo van der Waal, now Executive Producer of the La't Wiel Television Show and freelance writer.
- Marc Bow, premier motoring photographer who started at Wiel and co-found La't Wiel with Danie Botha in 2004.
