= Wrapped (magazine) =

South African LGBTQ magazine

Wrapped is a South African alternative lifestyle magazine that caters to the LGBTQ community.

Wrapped is headquartered in Pretoria, with international distribution points.

== History and profile ==
Wrapped was launched in 2004. Ladies And Ladders purchased the magazine early in 2006. Marie Gregory, owner and publisher originally form the UK, employed Albert Lotter, as Editor and with complete control over the magazine's direction and editorial drive.

During this period, Wrapped acquired a finalist position in the 2006 Nedbank Art's and Culture Trust Awards, for its contribution to culture in South Africa.

The magazine has been involved in various awareness projects and charity campaigns, such as the annual Sisters With Blisters walk which raises money for abused women and children.

The magazine switched to a bimonthly rather than monthly schedule beginning with their December 2006/January 2007 issue.

Morne Ebersohn assumed the role of publisher from Edition 12 of the magazine. Under his direction, the magazine was repackaged to cater to the 25- to 35-year-old gay man living in metropolitan areas. The magazine became the first South African LGBT lifestyle magazine to advertise on television, radio, cinema and the internet.

Wrapped became the first gay publication in South Africa to become Audit Bureau of Circulation (ABC) certified.

Advertising support for the magazine increased after the magazine was repackaged to become a truly lifestyle magazine.

In March 2008, the magazine launched the Wrapped TV Channel on YouTube, with plans to publish behind-the-scenes videos of what happens at Wrapped Magazine. During December 2008 a decision was made give Wrapped a cover to cover redesign. Edition 20 of Wrapped went on sale during the last week of April 2009 and the feedback on the magazine was overwhelming. The new design focussed on a much cleaner and more relevant magazine for the Wrapped target audience.

In February 2009, the magazine launched their new website.
