= PlayRoom (TV channel) =

- Broadcast area: South Africa
- Headquarters: Bryanston-Johannesburg, South Africa

Programming
- Languages: Zulu; English
- Picture format: 1080i HDTV

Ownership
- Owner: The Rooms Network
- Sister channels: MovieRoom

History
- Launched: 6 November 2023; 2 years ago

Links
- Website: playroomza.tv

PlayRoom is a South African children's television channel owned by The Rooms Network. Founded in 2023, the channel is available on DStv and airs its programming in national vernacular languages, with emphasis on Zulu.

== History ==
The channel was announced to the public in October 2023, with a 6 November launch date. The channel's emphasis on dubbed content in the vernacular languages, beginning with Zulu, was its selling point for DStv subscribers; initial dubbed content included Cocomelon and Akili and Me; as well as programming in English, such as PAW Patrol and Game Shakers, in addition to national productions. Morning programming was aimed at preschoolers, aging up in the afternoon to cater to kids, with a live afternoon show for tweens (PlayRoom Live). The channel launched at 3pm with the first edition of PlayRoom Live. Its presenters, known as Roomies in the channel's jargon, are in a format similar to the kids' show hosts of 90s and 2000s South African TV. In late June 2024, the channel added Supa Strikas in Zulu.

On 3 February 2025, PlayRoom Live relaunched with a new format and new presenters. It was shortlisted on 30 September for the nominations for the 2025 International Emmy Awards. In October, the channel added new national shows, Amu Nabangani and Culture Crew.
