= Digital Life =

South Africa consumer technology magazine

Digital Life (previously Unwired) was a monthly lifestyle and consumer technology magazine aimed at South African consumers published by technology media house ITWeb. The magazine was started in 2006 and the first issue appeared in October 2006. The magazine ceased publication with the June/July 2010 issue.

== See also ==
- Digital age
