= Loslyf =

South African Afrikaans-language pornographic magazine

Loslyf is a South African Afrikaans-language pornographic magazine. The magazine was founded in 1995 by J.T. Publishing, a South African subsidiary of the American Hustler. It was the first Afrikaans-language pornographic publication. Launched only one year after the end of apartheid, the magazine was greatly controversial as it posed a clear opposition to the conservative Afrikaner nationalist morals that influenced the apartheid government's censorship of media

== History ==
During South Africa's apartheid, the ruling Afrikaner dominated National Party enacted strict censorship over media. Publications were censored or banned for raising political criticism against the party. Also, the government censored any material that contradicted their moral values. Conservative Afrikaner moral values derived from Dutch Calvinism, which repressed sexual desires and advocated abstinence and chastity as forms of purity.

The title of the magazine itself, Loslyf, clearly opposes these values, translating in Afrikaans to "loose body/morals." Loslyf’s first editor, Ryk Hattingh, was no stranger to controversy, as he had previously worked as sub-editor under Max du Preez for the anti-apartheid newspaper Vrye Weekblad. Through the magazine, Hattingh wished to redefine the dominant perception of Afrikaner people and culture. He claimed, "Afrikaners have always been portrayed as khaki-klad repressed people and I wanted to show them as normal, sexual f***ing human beings!"

The first issue hit the shelves in June 1995 and featured the antagonistic and controversial spread "Dina at the Monument." The spread featured a model posing topless in front of the Voortrekker Monument. In 1949 the National Party dedicated the monument to the Voortrekkers who participated in the Great Trek. Scholars have argued that by photographing the nude model before a symbol of Afrikaner nationalism, Loslyf presents a direct opposition to the party and its values that gave rise to the censorship of the media. The issue was immensely popular, selling approximately 80,000 copies total.

Under Hattingh's management, the magazine took on a critical tone. Along with the nude spreads, Loslyf also featured a number of intellectual articles from well-known and respected writers. It also contained controversial political cartoons by Joe Dog and Konradski of Bitterkomix.

== Contemporary content ==
Since its debut, Loslyf readership has levelled out to around 20,000 copies sold per issue. This has been attributed to its loss of novelty factor. Also, after coming under the management of editor Karen Eloff, the magazine's first female editor, the magazine has changed direction toward a more sexually oriented magazine, dropping its critical and intellectual features. She claims that "people buy Loslyf because of the sex, and there is a place for everything, but Loslyf is just not the place for intellectual stories." However, readership did increase by 30% following Eloff becoming editor and posing nude within the magazine in a 2005 issue.

The magazine has also expanded to include a website.

== Recent controversies ==
Namibian-born Afrikaans singer Juanita du Plessis sued the magazine for "doctoring" a picture of her and including a vulgar headline insinuating that she was addicted to oral sex in the October 2004 issue. Du Plessis made a R200,000 defamation claim against the magazine. In 2007 the Pretoria High Court ruled in favour of Du Plessis and J.T. Publishers was forced to pay her R60,000.

In December 2004, Loslyf published an image of a woman's breast and claimed it to be that of local South African singer-celebrity Amor Vittone. Inside the magazine, there also appeared six other photos of breasts with captions implying that they were Vittone's. Following the issue's publication, Vitonne denied that any of the photos were legitimate and filed a R1,000,000 lawsuit against the magazine. The publisher eventually publicly apologised, pulled the issue from the shelves, and privately agreed to compensate Vitonne.

In 2005, a Loslyf reader was removed from a Nationwide Airlines flight for refusing to put away the magazine. After being told he was not allowed to read the magazine on the plane, businessman A.C. Hoffman bluntly refused and was eventually removed before takeoff. This raised controversy particularly because Hoffman had purchased the issue within the airport. The magazine abides by the rules regarding explicit content set out by the national Film and Production Board. Though, as Eloff claims, it is about sex, the magazine refrains from depicting images of sexual intercourse as well as other sexually explicit acts. This allows the magazine to be sold at cafés and airports, not only in sex shops.
