= Odyssey Magazine (South Africa) =

Odyssey Magazine is a South African conscious living magazine launched in July 1977. It describes itself as aimed at people "who would like to pursue, a more conscious and carbon-neutral lifestyle." It has print, digital and mobile enabled versions.

The magazine was founded by Jill Iggulden Stevens, who handed over the editorship to daughter-in-law Debra (Stevens) Robins of Mindful Media Publishing (Pty) Ltd in 2018, following the purchase of the magazine from Chris and Silke Erasmus who owned it for 18 years.

In 2004, Odyssey Magazine merged with Namaste Magazine, which aimed to empower individuals to take full responsibility for their own lives – emotional, mental and spiritual – a vision that Odyssey magazine continues to follow. Odyssey grew rapidly between 2005 and 2007. In late 2008, sister publication Simply Green was launched and Odyssey reached its all-time circulation high of over 18,000.

The magazine went digital with the publication of its April 2013 issue, saying the change was "driven by imperatives ranging from the much smaller carbon footprint of digital publications, through to the ease of access to a far wider audience using any existing digital platforms". Internet users can access the online magazine for free on the Issuu website.
