= SA Rugby Magazine =

South African rugby magazine

- February 2018 (Issue 255)
- Categories: Sport, Rugby union
- Frequency: Monthly
- Circulation: 24,871 (ABC Oct-Dec 2018)
- Publisher: Highbury Media (Pty) Ltd
- First issue: April 1995
- Country: South Africa
- Based in: Cape Town
- Language: English
- Website: www.sarugbymag.co.za
- ISSN: 1024-3216

SA Rugby magazine is a monthly South African Rugby Union magazine that covers Springboks, international, Super Rugby, Currie Cup, Varsity Cup, regional, provincial, club and schools rugby.

== History ==
The first issue of SA Rugby magazine, dated April 1995, cost R8.50 and went on sale two months before the 1995 Rugby World Cup, which was hosted by South Africa. Springboks wing Chester Williams was on the cover.

SA Rugby magazine was initially published by Random House Struik, before being sold to Strobe Publishing, which published the magazine until the December 2001-January 2002 issue, when Strobe closed. The title was then purchased by Highbury Monarch Communications (now Highbury Media) and relaunched with the May 2002 issue.

The magazine issued an Afrikaans edition from the September 2015 issue to the June 2016 issue.

In 2017, SA Rugby magazine began publishing 12 issues a year instead of 11 (with a combined January-February issue), which had been the case since 2002.

== Notable issues ==
The April 2005 issue of SA Rugby magazine was its 100th, featuring Ashwin Willemse, Brent Russell, Victor Matfield and Schalk Burger, and cost R16.95.

The May 2014 issue of SA Rugby magazine was its 200th, featuring François Steyn on the cover, and cost R29.90.

To celebrate its 20th anniversary in April 2015, SA Rugby magazine selected the best 20 Springboks since 1995. They were fullbacks André Joubert and Percy Montgomery; wings Chester Williams and Bryan Habana; centres Jean de Villiers, Jaque Fourie and François Steyn; flyhalves Joel Stransky and Henry Honiball; scrumhalves Joost van der Westhuizen and Fourie du Preez; loose forwards Francois Pienaar, Juan Smith and Schalk Burger; locks Mark Andrews, Victor Matfield and Bakkies Botha; hookers John Smit and Bismarck du Plessis; and prop Os du Randt. The selection panel was made up of 2007-World Cup winning coach Jake White, and veteran rugby writers Mark Keohane and Gavin Rich.

The biggest issue of SA Rugby in the magazine's history is the 260-page 2011 World Cup preview issue (September 2011, R25.95), which beat the 236-page 2007 World Cup preview issue (September 2007, R21.95).

The 188-page 2015 World Cup preview issue (September 2015, R29.90) was the first to also be published in Afrikaans. The last Afrikaans edition was published in June 2016.

== Staff ==
Simon Borchardt edited the magazine from 2002 to 2019 after stints from John Dobson (now Western Province coach) and Chris Schoeman. Gary Lemke, 2015 SAB Sports Journalist of the Year, is Highbury Media's sports editorial director, while other staff includes chief rugby writer and 2013 SAB Sports Journalist of the Year Jon Cardinelli, senior rugby writer Craig Lewis, and rugby writer Mariette Adams. Several freelance writers, from South Africa and around the world, also contribute to the magazine.

== Website ==
The magazine's website www.sarugbymag.co.za was launched in February 2013. It offers news, opinion, analysis, match previews and reports, live text commentary, videos, fixtures, results and logs.

In 2022, the website had 5,814,879 users and 38,205,052 pageviews.

== Awards ==
- 2002 PICA Award for Innovation in Magazine Publishing
