= Mshana =

- Editor: David Zinczenko
- Publisher: Media 24
- Founded: 2007
- Final issue: May 2008
- Country: South Africa
- Based in: Cape Town
- Language: English
- Website: http://www.mshana.co.za

Mshana was an entertainment magazine based in Cape Town (with an editorial office in Sandton) aimed at South African urban youth.

== History and profile ==
The first issue was published in 2007 by Media24 Family Magazines. The articles in the magazines were a combination of entertainment, trends, issues and advice and the magazine also includes about 36 pages of locally developed comics such as Unicity, Kasiwash and Mzanzi Beats. The language used in the magazine is a combination of English and street slang. It was headquartered in Cape Town.

Feature articles in issues included popular local music and entertainment stars such as Prokid, Brown Dash, DJ Cleo and Tuks. The magazine was very relevant to urban black youth culture and featured future stars like Teko Modise and Jozi.

Media 24 closed down Mshana magazine May 2008.

Peter Motloutsi, the founding journalist, was the acting editor when it folded, having been the deputy editor for some time. Motloutsi then joined Move! Magazine as a Features Editor, before joining eNews Channel.
