= Mass media in South Africa =

Overview of radio, television, print and digital media in South Africa

South Africa has a large mass media sector and is one of Africa's major media centres. While South Africa's many broadcasters and publications reflect the diversity of the population as a whole, English is the most commonly used language. However, all ten other official languages are represented to some extent. Afrikaans is the second most widely used language, especially in the publishing sector.

Until 1994, the country had a thriving Alternative press comprising community broadsheets, bilingual weeklies, and even student "zines" and photocopied samizdats. After the elections, funding and support for such ventures dried up, but there has been a resurgence of interest in alternative forms of news gathering in recent years, particularly since the September 11 attacks.

== Press freedom ==
Press freedom has a chequered history in South Africa. While some sectors of the South African media openly criticised the apartheid system and the 1948-1994 National Party government, they were hampered by government censorship during those years. For example, South African investigative journalist Donald Woods became renowned after he fled to live in the United Kingdom in exile after helping to expose the truth behind the death of Steve Biko, the leader of the Black Consciousness Movement, along with fellow journalist and current South African politician, Helen Zille. After the end of apartheid and National Party rule in 1994 however, censorship ended and a new constitution was enacted which has a Bill of Rights that guarantees that every citizen has the right to freedom of expression, which includes freedom of the press and media, the freedom to receive or impart information or ideas, freedom of artistic creativity, academic freedom, and freedom of scientific research.

These freedoms are generally respected in practice, and the press is considered relatively free. Laws governing the media and political control over its content are typically regarded as moderate, and there is little evidence of repressive measures against journalists. In consequence, South Africa is ranked 39th in Reporters Without Borders' worldwide index of press freedom 2015–2016.

However, there has also been criticism of certain aspects of the freedom of the press in South Africa. All the prominent daily newspapers are owned by the four largest media firms, which could lead to pro-corporate bias. In addition, the South African Broadcasting Corporation (SABC), the public broadcaster, is funded by the government.

Some media aspects of the Oilgate scandal have also been a cause for concern as was the banning of the publication of the cartoons of Muhammad in South Africa by Judge Mohammed Jajbhay on 3 February 2006.

According to media reports, the SABC blacklisted certain commentators and analysts who may be critical of the government.

Recently, the Protection of Information Bill and the proposed Media Appeals Tribunal has caused controversy both domestically and abroad with allegations that press freedom is under threat.

== Newspapers ==
The history of newspapers in South Africa dates back to 1800, when the governor of the Cape Colony initiated the publishing of the government-controlled Cape Town Gazette and African Advertiser. The first privately owned newspaper, the SA Commercial Advertiser was published in 1824, with Thomas Pringle and John Fairbairn as editors. The first Dutch language newspaper, De Zuid-Afrikaan, was published in 1830, the first African language newspaper, Umshumayeli Wendaba, in 1837, and the first Afrikaans language newspaper, Die Afrikaanse Patriot, in 1876.

The current newspaper industry is in a reasonably healthy state. According to a South African Audit Bureau of Circulation (ABC) survey in 1996, there were 36 daily and weekly urban newspapers in the country – 29 in English, four in Afrikaans, two in Zulu, and one in Xhosa. Differences in literacy levels can explain the dichotomy between demographics and publishing languages, the widespread popular use of English, and South Africa's history of censorship, which curbed the development of a culture of newspaper readership. There are also numerous complimentary (advertising-supported) local and community newspapers in several languages. An estimated 1.3 million newspapers are sold in South Africa daily.

There are several independently owned newspapers, most notably Mail & Guardian, however the majority are owned by four large publishing groups: Avusa, Naspers, Independent News and Media (owned by Sekunjalo Investments), and CTP/Caxton.

== Magazines ==
South Africa has a robust magazine industry, with an estimated 280 locally published titles; imported magazines add considerably to this number. The industry's annual turnover in 1998 was estimated to be about R 1.7 billion.

While the mass consumer market sector is dominated by only a few publishers (Naspers, Perskor, CTP Holdings, TML), the specialist consumer and trade & technical sectors are highly fragmented, comprising numerous small- and medium-sized publishers in addition to the aforementioned major players.

As could be expected from South Africa's recent history, its magazine market is (still) characterised by definite differences in the readership of magazines amongst the country's different race groups. A decline in traditional mass-consumer magazine titles, alongside the growth of specialist titles, also characterises the industry, as does the growth of magazines specifically aimed at black South Africans, such as Drum.

Naspers is the dominant player in the mass-consumer magazine sector and sells about two-thirds of all magazines read in South Africa, including imported titles. The company publishes large national titles such as Fair Lady, Sarie, Insig, SA Sports Illustrated, Kickoff, Huisgenoot, You and Drum. The Afrikaans language family magazine Huisgenoot has the largest circulation of any South African magazine, followed by its English-language version, You; together, these two magazines have a combined circulation of almost one million copies per week. Fair Lady and Sarie are South Africa's largest-selling English- and Afrikaans-language women's magazines, respectively.

Other large mass-market publishers are Perskor (Republican Press), CTP Holdings, and Times Media. Specialist consumer magazines are also published by the aforementioned publishers, as well as by Primedia Publishing, Kagiso Media, and Ramsay Son & Parker. In the trade and technical sector, Primedia is the largest publisher.

== Books ==
The book publishing industry in South Africa is relatively small but remains a key contributor to the economy. There are more than 120 publishers in the country, according to the Publishers' Association of South Africa (PASA). Among these are commercial publishers, university presses, non-governmental organisations, and one-person, privately owned publishers. Of the 120 publishers who are members of the PASA, approximately 12 are classified as large, 7 as medium-sized, and the remaining 101 as small.

Books are published in all eleven official languages of South Africa as well as in some non-official and foreign languages. Works published include fiction, nonfiction, children's books, reference works, and school and university textbooks. Electronic publishing is also a growing segment of the publishing industry. While some publishers specialise in the types of books they produce (for example, textbooks), most large and medium-sized publishers publish across several categories.

There are also several book importers and distributors active in South Africa, as the great majority of books sold in South Africa (especially fiction) are still imported, mostly from Britain and the United States. This has resulted in relatively high book prices relative to the average South African's income.

The South African publishing industry employs approximately 3,000 full-time employees and many freelance workers. In addition, the South African publishing industry is estimated to employ approximately 9,000 authors (full- and part-time), who together earn an estimated R150 million in royalties annually. The book-printing and bookselling are also largely dependent on this industry.

== Television ==
Television is the most tightly regulated media sector in South Africa and is (along with radio) regulated by the Independent Communications Authority of South Africa (ICASA). Broadcast rights, particularly for television, are granted by invitation only, and only two independent television broadcasters have been permitted to operate to date. Broadcast licenses mandate percentages of local, community, and educational content, and broadcasters are required to include such content as a condition of their licenses.

As a result, there are only four free-to-air terrestrial television channels in South Africa, the South African Broadcasting Corporation's SABC 1, SABC 2, and SABC 3, as well as e.tv. The South African Broadcasting Corporation or SABC is South Africa's state-owned public broadcaster. All broadcasters are subject to the Broadcast Complaints Commission.

Multichoice is the oldest provider of pay TV and satellite broadcasting in the country, with one terrestrial pay TV channel, M-Net, and DStv, a digital satellite television network with over 55 local and international channels that broadcasts to over 2 million subscribers throughout Africa. In November 2008, four new licenses were granted out of 18 applications for the operation of pay-TV services. Walking on Water (a Christian broadcaster), On Digital Media, and e-Sat (the satellite arm of e.tv) were all expected to start direct-to-home satellite broadcasts in mid-2008. This did not happen as only On succeeded in launching its Top TV service. Even Telkom Media, which was expected to operate satellite and IPTV services, including video-on-demand, never took off and was subsequently sold to Shenzhen Media South Africa. On Digital Media is 68% black owned.

== Radio stations ==
Radio has always been South Africa's largest broadcast medium. Since the 1960s, South Africa has been a world leader in FM radio technology. In 1962, five FM radio stations broadcast, each to a particular language group. The content of the broadcasts ranged widely, from music, sports, religion, current affairs, and drama. By the mid-1980s, another five languages had their own stations, and four music-only regional commercial broadcasters had been added to the FM network. The sector's deregulation in 1996 led to an even bigger proliferation of radio stations. For example, there are about 4 radio stations available to Johannesburg listeners.

Broadcasts range from the country-wide and regional radio stations of the state-owned and funded SABC to fully commercial, privately owned stations to community stations that target specific cities, towns, neighbourhoods, or ethnic groups. Approximately 80 community radio licenses have been issued, although a quarter are inoperative.

The majority of radio stations broadcast in English, although the other official languages of South Africa are also represented on the airwaves. ICASA regulates the industry.

== Internet and telecommunications ==
Compared with the rest of Africa, this sector is relatively large and robust. However, it is dominated by the fixed-line monopoly Telkom, which has been criticised in recent years for impeding further growth. Telephone and internet access is also available via mobile network operators, such as Vodacom and MTN.

== See also ==
- Alternative media in South Africa
- List of radio stations in South Africa
- List of newspapers in South Africa
- List of South African media
- Cinema of South Africa
- Internet censorship in South Africa
- Prevention and Combating of Hate Crimes and Hate Speech Act, 2023
- South African literature
- South African comics

== Bibliography ==
- Philip G. Altbach; Edith S. Hoshino, eds. (1995). "South Africa". International Book Publishing: An Encyclopedia. Garland. ISBN 9781134261260.
- Adrian Hadland (2012). "Africanizing Three Models of Media and Politics: The South African Experience". In Daniel Hallin and Paolo Mancini (ed.). Comparing Media Systems Beyond the Western World. Cambridge University Press.
