= Purity Nomthandazo Malinga =

South African Methodist bishop

The Reverend Purity Nomthandazo Malinga
- Presiding Bishop of the Methodist Church of Southern Africa
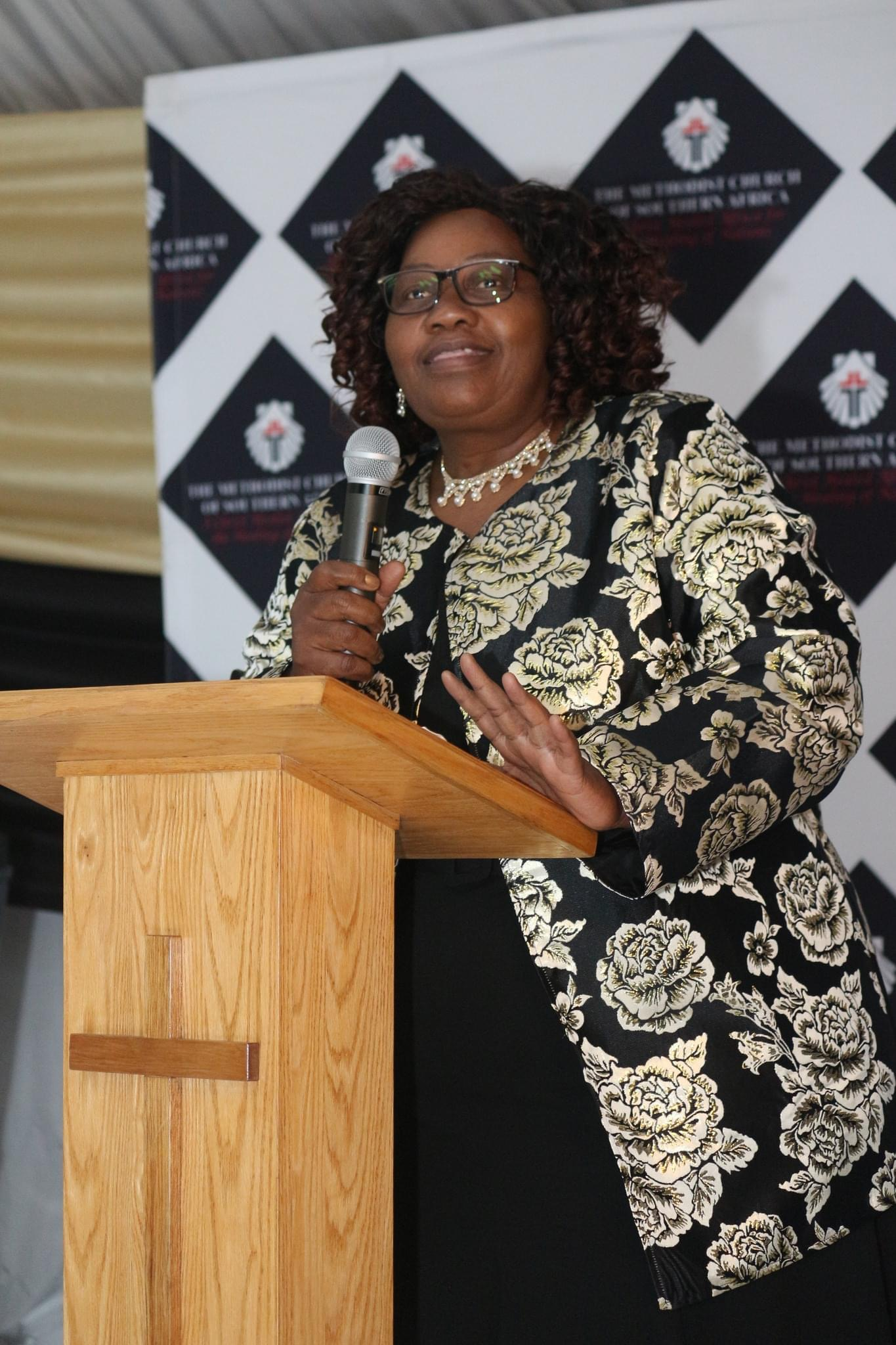
- Church: Methodist Church of Southern Africa
- Installed: 2019
- Term ended: 2023
- Predecessor: The Rev Ziphozihle Siwa
- Successor: The Rev Pumla Nzimande
- Other post: Bishop of Natal Coastal District

Orders
- Ordination: 1988 (minister)
- Consecration: 1999

Personal details
- Born: Purity Nomthandazo Malinga; 1958 (age 67–68) Ixopo, KwaZulu-Natal, South Africa
- Education: Federal Theological Seminary of Southern Africa; Harvard Divinity School (MDiv)

Purity Nomthandazo Malinga (born 1958) is a South African Methodist bishop and the 100th Presiding Bishop of the Methodist Church of Southern Africa (MCSA). Malinga was ordained to the Christian ministry in 1988, the fourth woman to be ordained in her denomination. In 1999, she became the first woman to be elected as a bishop in the MCSA, and served nine years as the bishop for the Natal Coastal region. She later became director of the MCSA's Education for Ministry and Mission Unit, which holds responsibility for overseeing theological education within the denomination. She is the first woman to become presiding bishop for the MCSA; she was elected to that position in 2019, succeeding Bishop Ziphozihle Siwa. The MCSA is the largest mainline Protestant denomination in Southern Africa and includes churches in Eswatini, Lesotho, Namibia, Botswana, Mozambique and South Africa.

== Biography ==
Nomthandazo Nobuhle Purity Malinga was born in 1958 in Ixopo, KwaZulu-Natal, South Africa, the eldest child of Siziba Jeffrey and Thenjiwe Emily Malinga. The family lived on a farm, and as a child, Malinga helped with chores and farming tasks, along with her younger brother.

Malinga was raised in the Methodist Church of Southern Africa from a young age. The family attended services at Webbstown Methodist Society, and her mother and grandmother were members of the Women's Manyano (or Women's Auxiliary). Malinga attended the Indaleni Methodist Institution, where she studied education, and became trained to be a schoolteacher. After graduating in 1976, she returned to Ixopo, where she taught for five years at the Siyakhona Primary school.

With encouragement from a local pastor, Reverend Raymond Khumalo, Malinga then decided to pursue ordained ministry in the Methodist church. Women had recently been allowed to present themselves as candidates for ordination. In 1981, she was accepted as a provisional candidate. From 1982 to 1983, she served as a minister-in-training in KaBhokweni.

From 1983 to 1986, she studied at the Federal Theological Seminary of Southern Africa, known as FEDSEM. FEDSEM was an ecumenical seminary that prepared students, primarily from Anglican, Congregationalist, Methodist, and Presbyterian churches, for the ministry. During the apartheid era, education in South Africa was widely segregated by race, and black students formed the majority of the student body at FEDSEM, although some colored and white students attended. The school was known for fostering both an ecumenical spirit among the students, and an awareness of social justice issues. At the time that Malinga attended, there were few women students, and all from the Methodist Church. After completing her studies at FEDSEM, Malinga spent a year in ministry at Ohlelo-Nkandla.

In 1988, Malinga was ordained, becoming only the fourth woman to be ordained in Methodist Church of Southern Africa. The following year, she went to study at Harvard Divinity School, in Cambridge, MA, in the United States, where she earned a Master of Divinity degree in 1992. After completing her degree, she returned to South Africa, where she became a lecturer in New Testament at FEDSEM. However, the school closed that same year. She then became the head of the education department for the Methodist Church of Southern Africa. She continued teaching, both at the Theological Education by Extension College in Johannesburg, and at Kilnerton Methodist College in Pretoria.

In 1999, she was elected as a bishop, becoming the first woman to hold this role in the Methodist Church of Southern Africa. She served as the bishop for Natal Coastal Region for nine years, stepping down in 2008. She then moved to Pretoria. She later served as director for the Methodist Church of Southern Africa's Education for Ministry and Mission Unit for three years, from 2016 to 2019.

In May 2019, she was elected as the 100th Presiding Bishop of the Methodist Church of Southern Africa. The vote was taken by ballot, cast by delgeates from the twelve synods of the church. She succeeded Bishop Ziphokuhle Siwa, who served as the 99th presiding bishop.

On 5 June 2021, St Stithian's College, a Methodist College near Johannesburg, renamed one of its main gates in her honor, naming it the Bishop Malinga Gate.
