= Mense (magazine) =

Mense (lit. "People") is an Afrikaans edition of People magazine published by Caxton Magazines in South Africa. The magazine was first published on 29 May 2006.
