= Tectonic Magazine =

Tectonic Magazine was South Africa's only open source magazine. It had been published every two months by Free Speech Publishing cc.

== History and profile ==
Tectonic Magazine was launched in March 2005. The magazine covered news, how-to's and in-depth articles on open source from an African perspective. It was available via subscription to South African readers, and online as a PDF to international readers.

Its tag-line was "Africa's source for open source news".

The magazine was an extension of the Tectonic web site, which was founded in 2001 by Alastair Otter, editor of Tectonic Magazine and publisher of www.tectonic.co.za. Otter announced the magazine's closing on 7 July 2009.
