= Open Secrets (South Africa) =

South African social justice nonprofit

- Formation: 2012; 14 years ago
- Founder: Hennie van Vuuren
- Type: Independent nonprofit organization
- Registration no.: 195-990-NPO
- Legal status: Registered nonprofit
- Headquarters: Cape Town, South Africa
- Region served: South Africa
- Official language: English
- Key people: Thandeka Gqubule-Mbeki (Chairwoman)
- Publication: Declassified: Apartheid Profits; Unaccountable; Who Owns South Africa? The Corporations & Economic Crime Report (CECR); Apartheid Guns and Money: A tale of profit
- Revenue: ▲ R10.4 million (2024)
- Staff: 22 (2026)
- Website: opensecrets.org.za

Open Secrets is a South African registered nonprofit social justice organization, based in Cape Town. Founded in 2012, Open Secrets works to expose economic crime and human rights abuses, holding powerful corporations, politicians, and other private individuals to account. It operates without funding from corporations or governments.

== History ==
Open Secrets was originally established through a fellowship awarded by the Open Society Foundation for South Africa in 2012. It operated as a project of the Institute for Justice and Reconciliation from January 2014.

The organization was founded by Hennie van Vuuren, a researcher and anti-corruption activist who was a fellow of the Open Society Foundation for South Africa, Director at the Institute for Security Studies, and author of The Devil in the Detail: How the Arms Deal Changed Everything (2011).

In 2017, the work of Open Secrets gained significant traction, when the organization published Apartheid Guns and Money: A tale of profit, a 600+ page book, authored by van Vuuren, about apartheid's economic crimes. The book was an exposé of the machinery that was created in defense of apartheid and in support of sanctions busting, as well as the people who profited from such. To create the book, research was conducted into over 45,000 documents from 26 public and private collections, across seven countries.

In the same year, Open Secrets registered as an independent nonprofit organization. It is also registered as a public benefit organization (PBO).

In 2018, Open Secrets launched a podcast titled Freedom for Sale, and launched a new website to serve as a repository for information about the organization's various projects.

== Operations ==
Open Secrets operates under a board of directors, and employs a team of investigators, lawyers, and campaigners. It receives no funding from corporations or governments, relying solely on funding from a group of philanthropic partners, as well as independent donors.

Publications

The organization also produces numerous publications, including:

- Investigative Reports, which covers a variety of topics and seeks to uncover new information and provide analysis on systemic crimes. The articles use archives, declassified documents, and firsthand accounts for evidence
- Declassified: Apartheid Profits, a series of articles released via Daily Maverick and news24, relating to individuals and corporations who supported apartheid
- Unaccountable, a series published on the Daily Maverick, covering corporations and individuals who have never been held accountable or have never faced substantive justice for economic crime
- Who Owns South Africa?, a series about powerful corporations holding significant wealth and influence in South Africa's economic industries
- The Corporations & Economic Crime Report (CECR), which aims to explore the most egregious cases of economic crimes and corruption by private financial institutions
- Numerous other publications with partner organizations

== Funders ==
Open Secrets' funders include The Claude Leon Foundation, Open Society Foundations, Millenium Trust, RAITH Foundation, ClimateWorks Foundation, and Heinrich Böll Stiftung Southern Africa.
