= Finweek =

Cover of Finweek

Finweek was a South African weekly business magazine published in both English- and Afrikaans-language editions. It was one of the country's largest circulating business titles. Competitors included fellow weekly Financial Mail.

Finweek was launched in September 2005, following the merger of Finance Week and Finansies & Tegniek, both established titles in their respective English- and Afrikaans-speaking markets. In the same month, the magazine merged with the financial website Finance24 to create Fin24.co.za, the country's most accessed financial portal.

Finweek's content focused on business and investment issues, with a leaning towards investigative stories and columns. The primary audience was business executives and investors.

The magazine was owned by Media24 Magazines, which is in turn owned by diversified media group Naspers (JSE: NPN, NASDAQ: NPSN).
