= IWeek =

iWeek is a biweekly trade publication for the South African technology sector published by technology media house ITWeb. The magazine was started in 2005. Sipho Memela is the founding editor of iWeek. In 2010 Martin Czernowalow became the editor of the magazine. The magazine was formerly published on a weekly basis. The circulation of iWeek was 9,300 copies. Sister magazine of iWeek is Brainstorm.
