= Telekom =

Telekom may refer to:

- A1 Telekom Austria Group, Austria
- Crnogorski Telekom, Montenegro
- Deutsche Telekom, Germany
- Hellenic Telekom, Greece
- Hrvatski Telekom, Croatia
- Magyar Telekom, Hungary
- Makedonski Telekom, North Macedonia
- Slovak Telekom, Slovakia
- Telekom Malaysia, Malaysia
- Telekom Romania Mobile, Romania
- Telekom Slovenije, Slovenia
- Telekom Srbija, Serbia
- Telekom Srpske, Bosnia and Herzegovina
- T-Mobile, United States of America
- Türk Telekom, Turkey

== See also ==
- Telecom (disambiguation)
