= MyBroadband =

South African technology news website and forum

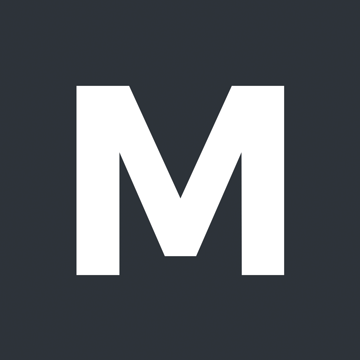

- Website type: ICT, Telecoms, Technology News
- Available in: English
- Owner: Broad Media
- Editor: Kan Vermeulen
- Website: mybroadband.co.za
- Commercial: Yes
- Users: 3.2 million
- Launched: 2003; 23 years ago
- Current status: Active

MyBroadband is South Africa's largest technology news website which was started in 2003 as a consumer advocacy forum to address broadband problems which existed in the country at the time. It is owned by mass media company Broad Media.

Since then, the website has grown into an IT news publication with an online community of 3.2 million unique visitors and over 10 million page views per month. MyBroadband is the largest IT website in South Africa, serving the local market with technology and business news, and hosts the largest online community in the country in the form of its forum. MyBroadband monitors and reports extensively on the local IT and telecommunications industry and publishes news articles and reports on various subjects and categories.

== History ==
MyBroadband was originally an online forum which was launched in 2003 to serve as a platform to discuss broadband services in South Africa. At the time, social media platforms - such as Facebook and Twitter - were not available and the MyBroadband Forum allowed South Africans to share information online. One of the main objectives of the MyBroadband Forum was to examine and discuss the South African broadband landscape, focusing on ADSL connections - which dominated the country and were run by the state-controlled monopoly Telkom at the time. The forum has over 200,000 members and more than 10,000,000 posts.

== Services ==
=== ICT news publication ===
MyBroadband is considered the leading ICT news publication in South Africa, and is visited by ICT professionals and tech-savvy consumers alike. It covers breaking news in the industry, unpacks technical and relevant ICT topics, and regularly conducts research into local market trends.

=== MyBroadband Magazine ===
In January 2017, MyBroadband launched the MyBroadband Magazine. The MyBroadband Magazine, published annually, is a premium publication aimed at ICT executives and professionals, and those working in the ICT field. The MyBroadband Magazine is distributed at the MyBroadband Conference and Expo each year, and sent directly to thousands of ICT executives.

Topics covered include broadband (DSL, Fibre, Mobile/Cellular, Satellite), telecommunications, ICT business, smartphones, software, ecommerce, cloud, IoT, banking and fintech, security, gaming, hardware, broadcasting, and blockchain/cryptocurrency.

=== Speed testing ===
MyBroadband offers a speed test web service that provides a free analysis on Internet performance metrics, such as connection data rate and latency. MyBroadband has test servers based in Johannesburg, Cape Town and Durban. The speed test service was launched in 2011 for web browsers, and was based on Flash technology at the time. In March 2017, MyBroadband upgraded the speed test service to HTML5 to allow more devices to access it. In June 2017, speed test apps were launched for Android and iOS.

MyBroadband publishes quarterly reports based on the results collected by the tests. These reports include network performance indicators of the telecommunications providers in South Africa.

The MyBroadband Speed Test service is viewed as an authoritative metric in the South African IT industry and its research is used by companies such as MTN and Vodacom for their "best mobile network" brand claims and advertising campaigns.

== Conferences ==
MyBroadband hosts multiple annual conferences - with its two flagship events the MyBroadband Conference and Expo, and the Cloud Conference. The MyBroadband Conference has grown to become the biggest conference of its type in South Africa - attracting 3,000 delegates. The MyBroadband Conference is focused on the telecommunications and IT industry in South Africa. The Cloud Conference was launched in 2015.

=== MyBroadband Awards ===
Each year at the MyBroadband Conference, awards are given to companies and individuals based on consumer surveys run by MyBroadband. The surveys are run quarterly and winners are decided for various categories.

==== Past winners ====
| Year | Fixed broadband provider | Mobile broadband provider | Internet Service Provider |
| 2008 | Telkom | Vodacom | Axxess |
| 2009 | Telkom | MTN | Axxess |
| 2010 | Telkom | Cell C | MWEB |
| 2011 | Telkom | 8.ta (Telkom) | Afrihost |
| 2012 | Telkom | Cell C | Afrihost |
| 2013 | Telkom | Telkom | Afrihost |
| 2014 | Telkom | Telkom | Afrihost |
| 2015 | Neotel | Telkom | Axxess |
| 2016 | Vumatel | Telkom | Axxess |
| 2017 | Openserve | Telkom | Axxess |
| 2018 | Openserve | MTN | Cool Ideas |
| 2019 | Liquid Telecom (Fixed Network Award) | MTN (Mobile Network Award) | Supersonic |

== Forum moderation ==
MyBroadband has a strong forum section, in which a diverse range of views are shared. Independent forum moderators are used to moderate all conversation and ensure no hate speech is posted. In its later years MyBroadband has been criticized for removing forum posts and banning users who contravene forum rules. Competitions are also regularly held on the MyBroadband forum. Criticisms have typically arisen as a result of disgruntled forum members, several which were banned for no provided reason. On 30 January 2017 MyBroadband created a special support forum for Afrihost in which the company representatives have moderation rights. Some members felt that this action was tantamount to giving preferential treatment to one of the site's largest sponsors and as a result, it drew some criticism.

The company has taken on advertisers to support it growth and hire more staff. Today, it is the largest IT news website in South Africa.
