= Telecom =

Telecom may refer to:

- Telecommunications
  - A telecommunications company
  - The telecommunications industry
- Telecom Animation Film, a Japanese studio

== See also ==
- Telecom (disambiguation)
- Telekom (disambiguation)
- List of telecommunications companies
  - BH Telecom, Bosnia and Herzegovina
  - Bouygues Telecom, France
  - BT Group, United Kingdom (formerly British Telecom)
  - China Telecom, China
  - ER-Telecom, Russia
  - Golan Telecom, Israel
  - Hong Kong Telecom, China
  - Nepal Telecom, Nepal
  - Nortel, Canada (formerly Northern Telecom)
  - Orange, France (formerly France Télécom)
  - Rostelecom, Russia
  - Telecom Argentina, Argentina
  - Telecom Éireann, Ireland
  - Gruppo TIM, Italy (formerly Telecom Italia)
    - Telecom Italia Media, Italy
    - TIM, Italy (formerly Telecom Italia Mobile)
    - Telecom Italia Net, Italy
    - Telecom Italia San Marino, San Marino
    - Telecom Italia Sparkle, Italy
  - Telstra, Australia (formerly Telecom Australia)
  - Tunisie Telecom, Tunisia
  - Spark NZ, New Zealand (formerly Telecom NZ)
