= Daily Maverick =

South African newspaper

- Daily Maverick screenshot on 29 March 2013
- Type: Daily newspaper
- Format: Online and print
- Publisher: Daily Maverick
- Editor-in-chief: Branko Brkic
- Associate editor: Ferial Haffajee
- Managing editor: Jillian Green
- Founded: 1 September 2009; 17 years ago
- Language: English
- Headquarters: Cape Town, Western Cape
- Country: South Africa
- Website: dailymaverick.co.za

Daily Maverick is an independent, South African, English-language, online news publication and weekly print newspaper, headquartered in Cape Town.

It was co-founded in 2009 by Branislav 'Branko' Brkic, who was also the publication's editor-in-chief, and Styli Charalambous, its Chief Executive Officer.

Daily Maverick's motto is Defend Truth, and it is funded by a combination of reader donations, grants, events, and advertising.

The publication states that journalism, in its opinion, needs to do two things. Firstly, it needs to help protect democracy, which it says it does by means of a large investment in accountability. And, secondly; it needs to help people navigate life, make better decisions, have better conversations, and ultimately aid people in the pursuit of a better life, which the publication says it achieves by explaining the impact of major events, providing perspective from an experienced newsroom, and publishing a variety of opinions, sourced from a network of contributors (in other words, avoiding bias and remaining objective and balanced with what they publish).

In terms of readership, the publication stated in 2024 that it had approximately 14.5 million unique website visits per month.

Daily Maverick has received many media-related awards and is known for, among other things, its investigation of the Gupta Leaks, which won the 2019 Global Shining Light Award.

The aforementioned investigation was credited with exposing the Indian-born Gupta family, and former President Jacob Zuma, for their role in the multi-year-long, systemic political corruption and state capture that occurred in South Africa, during Zuma's time in office. In 2018, Brkic received the Nat Nakasa Award for his role in the investigation. In 2021, Daily Maverick CEO Styli Charalambous also received the award.

== History ==
Daily Maverick was launched in 2009 by Brkic and Charalambous following the closure of Brkic's former print magazines, Maverick and Empire. They started a "daily iPad newspaper" in 2011 to complement the existing website; it closed in 2013. The weekly print newspaper, DM168, was launched in 2020.

In 2018, Daily Maverick launched Maverick Insider, a voluntary membership plan that doesn't have a paywall or standard donation request. Contributions from readers will keep Daily Maverick free for those who can't afford to pay.

Daily Maverick hosts articles by Declassified UK, a group of independent journalists who investigate British foreign policy, the UK military and intelligence agencies, and Britain's most powerful corporations.

Daily Maverick's membership model has been widely recognised as a successful example of the emerging membership trend that invites audiences of news publications to pay to become part of a readership community.

In addition to its membership programme, the privately owned publication also hosts paid live events. It has received philanthropic funding from the Open Society Foundation, Donald Gordon Foundation, Elaine & David Potter Foundation, and ABSA. It is a participant of the Media Investment Development Fund's South African Media Innovation Programme.

It also produces podcasts and documentaries, the latter of which includes Influence, a documentary directed by Poplak and Diana Neille, which premiered at the Sundance Film Festival in 2020. Section 16, which details the online attacks on Daily Maverick's women journalists, debuted at the Encounters Film Festival.

== Funding ==
Daily Maverick is wholly owned by a holding company, which is funded by a number of shareholders, many of whom are non-profits and trusts, which aligns with the publication's goal of continuing to provide balanced, unbiased news. No shareholder has more than 50% ownership of the publication.

The largest shareholder is South African non-profit Inkululeko South Africa Media. Other shareholders, with less than 15% of Daily Maverick share ownership, include: KMC Trust, Wolmarans Trust, Polyanna Trust, Bakkium Share Trust, Angel Trust, Noble Savage (Pty) ltd, Tondox (Pty) ltd, Styli Charalambous, Branko Brkic, and Tony Rattey.

== Founders ==
=== Branko Brkic ===
Branislav ‘Branko' Brkic is a Serbian-born South African journalist, publisher, and Daily Maverick's Co-Founder and editor-in-chief - he and Styli Charalambous co-launched the publication in 2009.

In 2018, Brkic was awarded the country's prestigious Nat Nakasa Award for initiating the collaborative corruption investigation into the Indian-born Gupta family and former South African President Jacob Zuma, known as the GuptaLeaks. The investigation won the 2019 Global Shining Light Award alongside Rappler, the Filipino publication founded by Nobel Prize laureate Maria Ressa.

Brkic was a book publisher in Yugoslavia before immigrating to South Africa in 1991. In 1998, he launched Timbila, the former South African National Parks magazine, and co-founded the IT business magazine Brainstorm in 2001 with Jovan Regasek.

Brkic launched the print business magazine Maverick in 2005, launching its sister publication Empire magazine in 2007. Both magazines closed in September 2008. Brkic and his partner, co-founder and CEO Styli Charalambous, launched Daily Maverick in 2009.

=== Styli Charalambous ===
Styli Charalambous is Daily Maverick's Co-Founder and CEO.

A regular instructor on revenue models in journalism for the Craig Newmark Graduate School of Journalism at the City University of New York, Charalambous was also a member of the steering committee for the Forum on Information & Democracy's working group on sustainability in journalism. In 2021, he was awarded the Nat Nakasa Courage and Integrity Award for his contribution to South African journalism.

Charalambous designed and launched the group's "Maverick Insider" membership programme, recognised globally as an example of a successful membership model. He speaks globally about media sustainability membership models, including the International Journalism Festival, the International Symposium on Online Journalism, World Association of Newspapers and News Publishers. He has published on the topic for Northwestern University's Knight Lab and Harvard University's Nieman Foundation for Journalism's publications Nieman Reports and Nieman Lab.

Charalambous co-produced The Highwaymen, a podcast by Daily Maverick's Richard Poplak and Diana Neille.

With a degree in finance and accounting from Nelson Mandela University, he completed his articles in South Africa with Deloitte in 2002 and qualified as a chartered accountant.

== Awards ==
- 2010 – Bookmarks – Individual and Team Publisher Awards – Best Editorial Team – Daily Maverick
- 2011 – Bookmarks – Product Awards – Email Marketing – Email Publication – Silver – First Thing Newsletter – Daily Maverick
- 2012 – SAB Sports Media Awards – New Media – Social Media Correspondent of the Year – Styli Charalambous – Daily Maverick
- 2012 – Taco Kuiper Award for Investigative Journalism – Runner-up – Greg Marinovich – Daily Maverick
- 2013 – Vodacom National Journalist of the Year Online winner – Greg Marinovich – Daily Maverick
- 2016 – CNN Multichoice African Business Journalism Award – Economics & Business Award – Diana Neille, Richard Poplak, Shaun Swingler & Sumeya Gasa, Daily Maverick, South Africa ‘Casualties of Cola: Outsourcing, Exploitation & the New Realities of Work'
- 2016 – Vodacom Journalism Award – Online Winner – Diana Neille, Sumeya Gasa, Shaun Swingler, Richard Poplak. Daily Maverick, Casualties of Cola
- 2016 – Taco Kuiper Investigative Journalism Awards – First Runner-up
- 2017 – Taco Kuiper Award for Investigative Journalism – #GuptaLeaks – 19 journalists from AmaBhungane, Daily Maverick and News24
- 2018 – Nat Nakasa Award for Media Integrity – South African National Editors' Forum – Branko Brkic
- 2018 – Standard Bank Sikuvile Journalism Award – #GuptaLeaks – Scorpio, amaBhungane and News24
- 2019 – SAFTA – Golden Horn award for Best Documentary Short – Nanlaban: The Philippines War on Drugs – Chronicle
- 2019 – Vodacom Journalist of the Year – Multi-platform – Sune Payne and Leila Dougan – Daily Maverick
- 2019 – Vodacom Journalist of the Year – Financial/Economics – Marianne Merten
- 2019 – Global Shining Light Award – #GuptaLeaks – Daily Maverick
- 2021 – Nat Nakasa Award for Media Integrity – Styli Charalambous
- 2021 – Thomas Pringle Award – Best Portfolio – Tevya Shapiro – Daily Maverick
- 2021 – International Sports Press Association (AIPS) – Certificate of Achievement Award – Craig Ray – Daily Maverick
- 2021 – SA Book of the Year Awards – Best Non-fiction – Six Years With Al Qaeda – Stephen McGown – Daily Maverick
- 2021 – Digital Media Africa Awards – Best Paid Content Strategy – Maverick Insider – Daily Maverick

== See also ==
- List of newspapers in South Africa
- Mass media in South Africa
- Mass media
- Newspaper
- Online newspaper
