= Brainstorm (magazine) =

Brainstorm is a monthly trade publication for the South African technology sector published by technology media house ITWeb. The magazine was started in 2001. The founders are two Serbian migrated to South Africa, Branko Brkic and Jovan Regasek. Branko Brkic is also the founding editor of the magazine. In November 2014 Jane Steinacker was appointed the editor. Sister publication of the magazine is iWeek.
