= Telkom Media =

- Company type: Public
- Industry: Pay television
- Headquarters: South Africa
- Products: Direct Broadcast Satellite
- Services: Television
- Owners: Telkom

Telkom Media is a pay-TV company based in South Africa. It is intended to be the first provider of IPTV services in South Africa.

== History ==
South African fixed-line telephone operator Telkom announced the creation of Telkom Media in August 2006, when it also applied for commercial satellite and cable-subscription broadcast licenses from the Independent Communications Authority of South Africa. Shareholders in the company included Telkom, Videovision Entertainment, MSG Afrika Media and WDB Investment Holdings.

In April 2007 the company said it was conducting an internal IPTV trial.

The total investment in startup was to amount to R7-billion, with R3.5-billion due to be sourced from Telkom.

Telkom Media received its licence in September 2007 in a process that included the award of three other new pay-TV licences.

=== Attempted sale of Telkom stake ===
In March 2008 Telkom said it would reduce its funding by R2.2-billion as other investments, such as a mobile wireless network, provided a shorter period for return.

In June 2008 Telkom said it intended to sell its (then 66 percent) stake in Telkom Media. By June it was said to have identified a buyer from among several interested parties and in November 2008 Telkom confirmed that negotiations were at an advanced stage. The interested party was rumoured to be a South African consortium funded out of China.

In March 2009 the interested Chinese party was identified as the Shenzhen Media Group amid reports that negotiations had failed because Telkom sought compensation for its sunk investment in the business.

=== Winding up and sale ===
In late March 2009 Telkom said it had failed to find a buyer and intended closing down the company, having written down a R430-million shareholder loan to it. The total costs of the company were estimated to be R700-million. A shareholder meeting to approve the shut down was due to be held before the end of April 2009.

However, in early May 2009 Telkom announced that it had sold its stake to Shenzhen Media, without immediately releasing further details.
