= Wesley Guild =

Christian organization

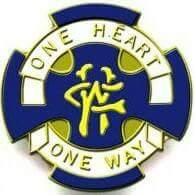
- Founded: 30 July 1896
- Founders: Rev W. B. FitzGerald, Rev Charles H. Kelly; Methodist Church
- Location: Worldwide
- Origins: Liverpool
- Region served: International
- Key people: Presiding Bishop, General President
- Website: https://wesleyguild.org.za/

The Wesley Guild (also known as WG or Methodist Guild) is a worldwide Christian organisation, based in the United Kingdom, that aims to retain young people within the Methodist Church. It was founded on 30 July 1896 in Liverpool, England, and its aim is to help young people to band together using the model known as the "four Cs of Christ":

- Comradeship (of young Methodists)
- Consecration (of body, soul and spirit to the Lord Jesus Christ);
- Culture (of mind to ensure thoughtful and intelligent life);
- and Christian Service (for the building up of the Church and the Kingdom of God).

== Beginnings ==
The Wesley Guild was founded by Rev Charles Henry Kelly and Rev W. Blackburn FitzGerald. Kelly advised the Church on the importance of retaining young people who were lost each year to Methodism after leaving Sunday school while Blackburn formed a group to work with young people for devotional purposes, evangelism, prayer and overseas missions. On 30 July 1896 the Wesleyan Methodist Conference gave a go-ahead for the Wesley Guild to operate in the United Kingdom. In 1899 it expanded to West Africa (Ghana, Nigeria, Ivory Coast and Sierra Leone), and in 1918 was introduced into Canada, British Guyana and Southern Africa (Namibia, Lesotho, Swaziland, South Africa and Botswana).

=== Membership ===
Membership is open only to the members of the Methodist Church. In Southern Africa and Sri Lanka the Wesley Guild remains an entity of the Methodist Youth Department. Since inception there has been no age limits for the Wesley Guilds leaving the organisation with three grades of members that include young people who are already attached to the Church, with others not yet ripe for such identification, and "older people but young at heart"

=== Aims and objectives of the Wesley Guild ===
“I desire by the grace of God to live and lead a Christian life and take an active role in promoting the aims and objectives of the Wesley Guild, I shall GO, Unite, Inspire, Love and Develop." Wesley Guild pledge

- To foster and promote discipline in Christ amongst young people in and outside the Church in general and those within the department in particular through implementation of the 4C's for Christ (Consecration, Comradeship, Creativity, and Community Development).
- To encourage young people to devote themselves and to take active participation in the affairs of the Church, growth and development of the Church [Priesthood of all Believers].
- To deepen the spirituality of young people by promoting earnest study of the Bible as individuals, through bible studies and evangelistic programs.
- To promote loyalty to the work of God in general and the Church, in particular.
- To present God through the Church.

== Motto ==
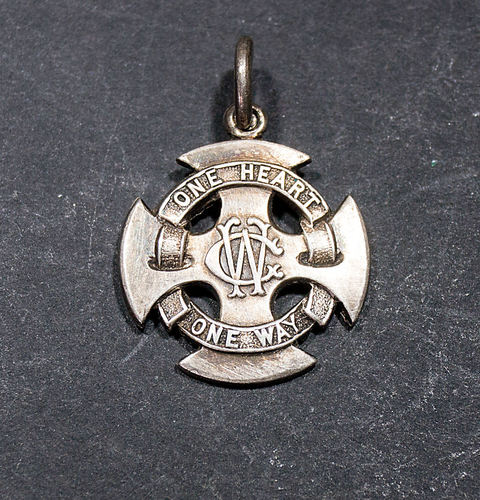
The Wesley Guild medal

The "One Heart, One Way" motto of the Guild was suggested by the heraldic motto of Earl of Exeter - Cor unum, via una. A cross-like emblem that was placed at the entrance of the Castle of the Earl of Exeter in Britain had this inscription as taken from the Bible Book of Jeremiah 32:38 and was used as a guiding principle for the knights of the Earl. The emblem was adopted for the use of the Wesley Guild in 1898 and formally used in 1903 when the Wesley Guild charter first introduced.

=== Wesley Guild pin ===
Before the guilds introduced the royal blue uniform, the Wesley Guild pin became the symbol. A Royal Blue Cross points in four directions and represent the basic Christian principles of faith, love, hope and peace, with the Motto "One Heart, One Way" and the WG acronym at the centre. The Wesley Guild pin is worn on the left, symbolically above the heart.

== International Presence ==
The Wesley Guild spread from Britain to the other parts of the world as early as 1898 in Sri Lanka, by 1908 there were about 120 Guilds that were operating outside Britain with the biggest number in Trinidad and Barbados and a few in Gibraltar. In 1909 there were Guilds in India, Ceylon, China, South Central Africa, West Indies. South Africa saw the introduction of the organisation in 1918 mostly in the White side of the Methodist Church, the black congregations saw the introduction of the Guilds in the 1940s.

The Wesley Guild is active in twelve countries

- Botswana
- United Kingdom
- Ghana
- Lesotho
- Mozambique
- Namibia
- Nigeria
- Pakistan
- Sierra Leone
- Sri Lanka
- South Africa
- Eswatini

The Wesley Guild has ceased to exist in these countries

- Barbados
- Trinidad
- Guyana
- China
- Ceylon
- Gibraltar
- Ivory Coast
- Sudan
- Congo
- Italy
- West Indies
- Jamaica

== See also ==
- John Wesley, the namesake
