= Independent Online =

South African news and information website

- IOL website screenshot
- Type: News
- Format: Online newspaper
- Owner(s): Sekunjalo Investments; Public Investment Corporation; China International Television Corporation; China Africa Development Fund
- Language: English
- Headquarters: Cape Town, South Africa
- Website: www.iol.co.za

Independent Online, popularly known as IOL, is a news website based in South Africa that serves the online versions of a number of South African newspapers, including The Star, Cape Times, Cape Argus, Weekend Argus, The Mercury, Sunday Tribune, The Independent on Saturday, and The Sunday Independent. IOL regularly distributes Chinese state media content.

IOL has been involved in various controversies, including making up fake stories, fictitious journalists and doxing. IOL is controlled by majority shareholder, Sekunjalo Investments and its chairman Iqbal Survé.

== Corporate affairs ==
=== Ownership ===
Sekunjalo Investments initially owned 55% of the company via its subsidiary Sekunjalo Independent Media, the Public Investment Corporation (PIC) owned 25%, and two Chinese state-owned enterprises (China International Television Corporation and the China Africa Development Fund) owned the remaining 20% of the newspaper. China International Television Corporation is a wholly owned subsidiary of state broadcaster China Central Television (CCTV). Before 2013, IOL was owned by Tony O'Reilly's Independent News & Media.

At some point, IOL was sold off from Sekunjalo Independent Media while the print publications entity Independent Newspapers remained under the ownership of Sekunjalo Independent Media.

The change in ownership structure came at a time when the South African Clothing and Textile Workers Union (SACTWU) had sued Sekunjalo Independent Media in the Western Cape High Court for failing to repay a loan of ZAR 150 million plus interest in aid of funding the purchase of the company from Tony O'Reilly. The PIC had also filed an application asking the court to liquidate Sekunjalo Independent Media. On 26 March 2026, South Africa's Supreme Court of Appeal ordered Sekunjalo Independent Media to repay SACTWU the loan plus accumulated interest, totalling R458 million.

=== Management ===
Viasen Soobramoney took over as CEO of Independent Online from Vasantha Angamuthu in May 2023. Angamuthu unexpectedly resigned from both her positions as CEO of Independent Online and as CEO African News Agency, sister companies within Survé's media empire.

In 2023, Independent Media issued retrenchment notices to its staff for the fifth time since Sekunjalo's purchase of the news organisation. IOL staff were initially not affected but later added to the list of business units facing job cuts. By October 2023, at least a third of staff were retrenched and the company failed to pay severance packages on time and instead issued grocery vouchers to the value of ZAR 2500 which initially were not loaded with any cash.

At the end of 2023, Group CEO of Independent Media unexpectedly resigned after 16 months in the job prompting Survé to again take up an executive role in the company.

== Controversies ==
=== Chinese censorship ===
In 2018, Reporters Without Borders reported that an IOL columnist was forced out after publishing a column condemning the persecution of Uyghurs in China.

=== Information laundering ===
According to The Economist, IOL "often engages in 'information laundering' designed to make sentiment appear homegrown, says Herman Wasserman at the University of Cape Town. For instance, it will run a Chinese news-agency story on the biolab conspiracy, then get a left-wing student leader to write an article expressing concern about the supposed biolabs. Chinese news agencies will use that to write about how South Africans are worried, thus manufacturing a 'story' out of nothing at all."

=== Bank account closures ===
IOL and Independent Media's banking facilities were threatened in 2022 when Standard Bank issued a notice to cut all ties with any company within the Sekunjalo Group. This followed several other banks refusing to do business with the investment group, its subsidiaries and directors.

=== Fake stories ===
In March 2020, IOL and the Durban-based Daily News published an article accusing a competitor news website, Daily Maverick, of "orchestrating and financially sponsoring a fake news smear campaign against prominent politicians, businessmen and executives, including Independent Media executive chairman Iqbal Survé." Daily Maverick took the matter to the High Court of South Africa, which found that the article was defamatory and unlawful, and ordered that IOL and Daily News retract the story and apologise, and that the writer of the article, Modibe Modiba, pay R100 000 in damages to Daily Maverick.

In 2021, IOL published a series of articles about a Tembisa woman having delivered decuplets (ten babies) which were penned by Pretoria News editor Piet Rampedi. The babies were referred to as the Tembisa 10. The story was debunked as fake news as no evidence of the births was available and multiple requests for donations were made both in print and online Independent Media platforms. Rampedi, Survé, IOL and Independent Media newspapers all went on to claim that the babies were trafficked but they provided no evidence to support their claims. Rampedi eventually resigned in January 2023 following a report by the Public Protector which found that the story was a lie. Neither Rampedi nor the company or any of its publications apologised for the story; however, the 125-year-old Pretoria News ceased to be published a few months later.

== Fictitious journalists ==
In 2022, IOL was accused of making up a fake journalist called Jamie Roz to spread fake news and disinformation in support of its chairman and controversial businessman Iqbal Survé.

In 2023, veteran journalist Chris Roper found that a series of anonymous articles on IOL were likely written by Survé's spin doctor Feroza Petersen, who together with The Sunday Independent editor Sizwe Dlamini had penned many articles in support of Survé. News24 suggested that "Jamie Roz" could be Petersen, whose maiden name is (Fe)roz(a) Jamie, and also found that "Edmond Phiri", a byline used by IOL in articles supportive of Survé, is another undeclared fake persona.

IOL was dubbed the "Book of Iqbal" in a satirical piece published in City Press, after a series of articles praising Iqbal Survé's role at the World Economic Forum featured on the news website, written by an unknown and unidentifiable writer, Lerato Molefe.

== Doxing ==
On 15 July 2024, Independent Media and IOL held a press conference in Cape Town, titled "The Unmasking Project", where they claimed to reveal the identity of an anonymous X user known only as Goolam (@goolammv). Independent Media's KwaZulu-Natal regional editor, Mazwi Xaba, claimed that the person linked to the account was Mohammed Vawda, a population statistics lecturer at the University of KwaZulu-Natal and part-time comedian. Other speakers at the press conference included Adri Senekal de Wet, Independent Media's editor-in-chief, Sifiso Mahlangu, editor of The Star, Siyavuya Mzantsi, editor of Cape Times, Melanie Peters, managing editor, Taariq Halim, Independent Media's Western Cape regional editor responsible for the Cape Argus and Daily Voice tabloid publications, and Lance Witten, editor-in-chief of IOL. Former cabinet minister, Lindiwe Sisulu, also shared her views on the anonymous X account, claiming that it was responsible for her failure to be elected ANC president at the party's conference in 2017.

Independent Media and IOL were accused of doxing, and Vawda denied being the person behind the anonymous account. Vawda said that he had received death threats as a result, and that he and his family had gone into hiding for their own safety. Vawda conceded that his job at the university was also put in jeopardy due to the university being questioned about its association to a 'racist' account. On 19 July 2024, Vawda's lawyers filed summons in the High Court, seeking R1.2 million in damages as a result of the harm caused to Vawda. According to court papers, a contract killing was arranged on 15 July 2024 offering a reward of R250 000 for Vawda's life.

== See also ==
- List of newspapers in South Africa
