= Piet Rampedi =

South African journalist (born 1980/81)

- Born: 1980 or 1981 (age 45–46)
- Education: University of South Africa
- Occupations: Investigative journalist and publisher
- Years active: 2002–present
- Awards: CNN African Journalist Award (2012)

Piet Mahasha Rampedi (born 1980 or 1981) is a South African investigative journalist who was the editor of Pretoria News from 2021 to 2023. He has also worked at the City Press, Sunday Times, Sunday Independent, and as the founder and editor of African Times. He began his career in broadcast journalism in 2002.

Rampedi is best known for having reported two highly prominent stories that were later exposed as hoaxes: in 2014, he co-wrote with Mzilikazi wa Afrika a series of reports about the existence of a so-called rogue unit at the South African Revenue Service, and in 2021, he wrote a series of reports about the Tembisa 10 decuplets. However, other investigative journalism by Rampedi has been widely admired, including his reporting with Adriaan Basson on tenderpreneurship in Limpopo involving then African National Congress Youth League (ANCYL) president Julius Malema.

== Early life and career ==
Rampedi was born in 1980 or 1981 and grew up in Ga-Mokgwathi, a village in Mopani in present-day Limpopo Province. He decided to become a journalist after a school trip to the SABC's studios in Johannesburg in 1997. He subsequently completed a Bachelor of Arts in communication and political science at the University of South Africa in 2001, and he began his career in broadcast journalism at e.tv, in 2002, and then at the SABC, from 2003.

== City Press: 2008–2012 ==
In 2008, Rampedi joined City Press, where he became known for a series of exposés about the commercial interests of rising politician Julius Malema of the African National Congress (ANC) Youth League. In this capacity, he was one of the Mail & Guardian's 200 Young South Africans in 2010. For three years at City Press, he and Adriaan Basson investigated Malema, in Rampedi's summation because, "When we started suspecting this guy was living beyond his means we went out of our way to find out where his income came from". In 2012, their reporting – which revealed, among other things, Malema's involvement in tenderpreneurship in Limpopo – won the general print news award at the CNN African Journalist Awards in Zambia.

Rampedi's reporting on Malema led him into conflict with Malema and his allies, including Limpopo Premier Cassel Mathale, who publicly criticised Rampedi and questioned his "agenda". On one occasion, at a press conference at Luthuli House, Malema called Rampedi "a small boy" and a "poor, stupid reporter who accepts brown envelopes". In early 2010, ANC Youth League spokesperson Floyd Shivambu attempted to smear City Press's investigative editor, Dumisane Lubisi, who was working with Rampedi on the Malema investigation; Rampedi and several other national journalists subsequently wrote to the ANC and to the South African National Editors' Forum (SANEF) to decry the league's intimidation tactics. In December 2011, the ANC rescinded the press accreditation of Rampedi, and of Frank Maponya of the Sowetan, ahead of its provincial elective congress; and Rampedi later said that he had received intimidating phone calls and had contracted a bodyguard while reporting the Malema stories. His editor-in-chief at City Press, Ferial Haffajee, defended him strongly, calling him "the person who makes the politicians go nuts in Limpopo with his forensic coverage of the decline of governance there."

== Sunday Times: 2014–2016 ==
After a stint at the Sunday Independent as a senior investigative reporter from 2012, Rampedi became political editor for the Independent Media Group between 2013 and 2014. After that, he joined the Sunday Times.

=== The rogue unit ===
In late 2014, Rampedi was the lead journalist on a series of reports that alleged the existence of a so-called rogue unit within the South African Revenue Service (SARS). According to one report, written by Rampedi, Mzilikazi wa Afrika, and Stephan Hofstatter, the unit had spied on citizens, as well as on politicians; another claimed that SARS owned a brothel. The political fall-out from the reporting included the suspension of the entire SARS executive committee – including acting commissioner Ivan Pillay and group executive Johann van Loggerenberg – by Tom Moyane.

In December 2015, the Press Ombudsman found that the reporting had been "inaccurate and unfair"; of Rampedi in particular, the ombudsman said, "Either he was misled by his source, or he deliberately misled the public, his newspaper, as well as this office". The Sunday Times was ordered to retract all stories about the "rogue unit saga" and to apologise publicly in writing to the three men they had implicated: Pillay, van Loggerenberg, and Finance Minister Pravin Gordhan. The paper printed a full-page editorial apology in April 2016, admitting that the paper "had got some things wrong... in particular, we stated some allegations as fact, and gave incomplete information in some cases. In trying to inform you about SARS, we should have provided you with all the dimensions of the story and not overly relied on our sources."

The rogue unit reporting was linked by observers to a campaign by Moyane and his political backers to capture and disable SARS. However, Rampedi maintained the truth of his reporting; as late as 2019, he said on Twitter that the rogue unit had been covered up through "narrative fixing by some media 'cabals'" – i.e. media capture – in the service of Minister Gordhan.

=== Aftermath ===
Rampedi resigned from the Sunday Times in 2016. His resignation letter was subsequently posted online at Uncensored Opinion; in it, Rampedi explains:

The reasons for my resignation are, among other things, what I consider to be unethical conduct by the Sunday Times editors and/or Times Media Group in entering into an underhanded deal with Ivan Pillay, Johann Loggerenberg, representatives of Minister Pravin Gordhan and other former SARS officials... a deal with Minister Gordhan and other former SARS officials which seeks to discredit me and all the evidence that may point towards them in respect of the alleged rogue unit activities...

From 2016 to 2019, Rampedi edited African Times, a newspaper he founded. The first edition of the newspaper, published on 31 August 2016 in Limpopo and Gauteng, was hailed by Communications Minister Faith Muthambi. He was also the president of the Forum of Journalists for Transformation, a body founded in 2015 as a "foil" to SANEF, and on 5 November 2018, he replaced Thabiso Kotane as the host of Capricorn FM's weeknight talk show.

== Independent Media: 2019–2023 ==
In March 2019, Rampedi returned to Iqbal Survé's Independent Media Group as head of its investigative unit. Later that year, he was appointed as deputy editor of the Sunday Independent. In that capacity, in 2020, he broke an important story about alleged conflicts of interest in COVID-19 procurement in Gauteng, leading to inquiries into the conduct of presidential spokesperson Khusela Diko and provincial minister Bandile Masuku.

On 1 February 2021, Rampedi replaced Valerie Boje as editor of Pretoria News, another Independent Media publication.

=== Clashes with colleagues ===
During his early tenure at Independent Media, Rampedi's continued activity on social media led twice to other journalists taking legal action against him. Then, in August 2019, Rampedi accused freelancer Oliver Meth of working as a paid journalist for Cyril Ramaphosa's presidential campaign. Then, in March 2020, after Jacques Pauw wrote a Daily Maverick piece about the rogue unit saga, Rampedi called Pauw a "liar" and "molester"; he also referred to the Daily Maverick as "propaganda media" and to editor Branko Brkic as "a modern-day Joseph Goebbels".

=== The Tembisa 10 ===
Months into his editorship at Pretoria News, on 8 June 2021, Rampedi wrote and published an exclusive story about Gosiame Sithole, a woman from Tembisa who, according to the story, had given birth to decuplets in a Pretoria hospital, breaking the Guinness World Record for multiple birth. The story was picked up by international outlets. However, the national Department of Health said that it had no record of the birth, leading Rampedi to allege further that government denials were part of "a cover-up of mammoth proportions": "a campaign to cover up medical negligence that involved senior politicians and public servants including Premier David Makhura, provincial minister Nomathemba Mokgethi and Steve Biko Hospital chief executive Mathabo Mathebula" The government continued to maintain that the alleged cover-up was more likely a "journalistic error".

For his part, Rampedi maintained the truth of his reports, as did Survé, who later told a media briefing that two of the decuplets had died and another eight had been "trafficked" by a syndicate which appeared to involve government and various public hospitals. The Gauteng Government ultimately said that it would sue Rampedi and Independent Media if they did not retract Rampedia's allegations of a cover-up.

Meanwhile, Independent Media launched several different probes into the editorial and journalistic handling of the story. In October 2021, the Daily Maverick reported that the media company's internal ombudsman had concluded as early as 5 July that Rampedi's reporting "failed to pass the basic principles of journalism" and amounted to a "hoax". An independent external investigation, chaired by advocate Michael Donen, concurred that the story was "reckless" and recommended that Rampedi should be subject to disciplinary action. Although Survé defended Rampedi, saying that "we should cut him some slack" for having "made a mistake" in a "feel good" piece, SANEF said in a statement that Donen's findings confirmed that Rampedi's story "was a clear case of a gross lapse of ethical journalism that has done untold damage to the profession at a time we are rebuilding the trust relationship with the public." Richard Poplak of the Daily Maverick said that Rampedi was "a connoisseur of bullshit, a liar's liar who lies so routinely that he probably doesn't know he's lying anymore."

The Public Protector subsequently launched its own investigation following a complaint by Teboho Tsotetsi, who had been identified as the father of the so-called Tembisa 10. Acting Public Protector Kholeka Gcaleka reported in December 2022 that all available evidence suggested that the decuplets story was false. Rampedi rejected her report, saying:

I still stand by the decuplets story, and believe that in time I will be vindicated. The Acting Public Protector's report looks like nothing but a blunt tool used to legitimise the government's previous denials and desperate cover-ups... The decuplets story was based on months of engagements and work, first-hand accounts of various sources close to Ms Sithole, including friends and relatives, who had no reason to mislead me. They all corroborated it independently from each other... It is sad to see the story turned into a political football to further the ends of undermining my reputation and professional integrity, as well as that of my employers.

=== Resignation ===
Rampedi resigned as Pretoria News editor with effect from 1 February 2023. Independent Media did not provide reasons for his departure, calling it "an internal matter".
