= Tembisa 10 =

South African journalistic hoax

- Author: Piet Rampedi
- Subject: A 37-year-old woman from Tembisa gives birth to 10 babies in one pregnancy
- Publisher: Pretoria News
- Publication date: 8 June 2021
- Publication place: South Africa
- Media type: Newspaper article

The Tembisa 10 was a South African journalistic hoax that falsely claimed that a 37-year-old Gauteng woman, Gosiame Thamara Sithole, had given birth to ten babies in a single pregnancy. The story was published by Pretoria News on 8 June 2021 and quickly gained widespread attention, with claims that the births had set a new Guinness World Record. However, official investigations later confirmed that the decuplets never existed. The article was subsequently declared a 'hoax'.

== Public backlash ==
The article was widely condemned as a major journalistic failure. Media professionals criticized it as a "reckless fabrication", and senior journalists dismissed it as a "phantom illegal scam-piece". The article's author, Pretoria News editor Piet Rampedi, was ordered to publicly apologise by an internal panel from Independent Media. The panel also criticized the publication for damaging public trust in the media.

Despite widespread criticism, Rampedi and Independent Media owner Iqbal Survé continued to defend the story. In October 2021, Survé held a press briefing in Cape Town, where he claimed that the babies had disappeared after being trafficked by a syndicate of politicians, government leaders, and hospital officials. He further announced plans to release a ten-part investigative documentary alleging a cover-up.

== Official findings ==
In December 2022, South Africa's Public Protector, Kholeka Gcaleka, officially concluded that the Tembisa 10 story was false. The report found no medical records, eyewitness accounts, or evidence supporting the claim that Sithole had ever been pregnant with decuplets.

The scandal remains one of South Africa's most infamous cases of journalistic malpractice, raising concerns about media ethics, fact-checking, and the accountability of news organizations in the digital era.

On 31 January 2023, Independent Media announced that Rampedi had resigned, effective 1 February 2023. Rampedi continued to insist on its accuracy despite mounting evidence contradicting his claims. His resignation came nearly 18 months after the story was first published and widely discredited. Prior to his resignation, Rampedi publicly rejected the findings of Gcaleka as flawed and accused the Public Protector's office of not interviewing him or Independent Media staff when conducting investigations. Despite the overwhelming evidence against the story, Independent Media, chaired by businessman Iqbal Survé, initially defended the report and alleged a government cover-up However, the company later faced intense scrutiny, including allegations that it had fabricated a writer named "Jamie Roz" to attack critics. The Tembisa 10 controversy further damaged the credibility of both Rampedi and Independent Media, which was already dealing with financial and legal challenges. Following Rampedi's resignation, Kennedy Mudzuli was appointed as acting editor of Pretoria News.
