= The Sunday Independent (South Africa) =

Weekly newspaper based in Gauteng, South Africa

- Type: Weekly newspaper
- Format: Broadsheet
- Owner(s): Sekunjalo Independent Media
- Publisher: Independent News & Media
- Editor: Sizwe Dlamini
- Founded: 1995
- Headquarters: 47 Pixley Seme Street, Johannesburg
- Circulation: 41,464 (as of 2008)
- Website: www.iol.co.za/sundayindependent

The Sunday Independent is a weekly English-language newspaper based in Gauteng, South Africa. It is one of the titles under the Independent News & Media South Africa group acquired by the Sekunjalo Media Consortium largely funded by Chinese state media and was owned previously by Independent News & Media. The paper is distributed mainly in the Gauteng region, but is distributed across South Africa.

== Ownership ==
The Sunday Independent is owned by Sekunjalo Consortium, the controlling shareholder of the Independent Newspapers, which also owns Cape Times, The Star, Pretoria News, and Cape Argus among others. The current chairman is South African billionaire entrepreneur Iqbal Survé, who assumed the role in 2013.

Survé is accused of removing credible journalists and editors and replacing them with sycophants who write favourably about him and his business empire. In September 2022, Sizwe Dlamini was appointed acting editor of The Sunday Independent. Dlamini was found to have penned a large number of articles in favour of Survé. Dlamini has also been credited for making up a fake journalist.

== Digital presence ==
The Sunday Independent has a digital presence through Independent Online (IOL), which includes local and worldwide news, sports and entertainment news, and a social media presence. Its publisher adheres to a "digital first, print best" approach, ensuring that all stories are available on both digital and print media.

The Sunday Independent's coverage focuses on daily national, local, and worldwide news and analysis. Its leader and opinion page allows people to share their thoughts on current events.

== Products ==
The Sunday Independent houses the Business Report, a financial newspaper. The Sunday Independent also carries supplements such as the Sunday Magazine, which offers readers entertainment news and coverage of music, film, books, tech, lifestyle, and art; and Classifieds.

== Supplements ==
- Business Report (Sunday)
- Life (Sunday)

== Readership figures ==
Estimated readership
	AIR
January–December 2012	81,000
July 2011 – June 2012	67,000

== See also ==
- List of newspapers in South Africa
