= Raymond Heard =

Canadian-South African journalist (1935–2026)

- Born: Raymond Elliott Heard; December 18, 1935; Johannesburg, South Africa
- Died: October 17, 2026 (aged 90); Toronto, Ontario, Canada
- Education: University of the Witwatersrand (BA, political science); Harvard University (Frank Knox Fellow)
- Occupations: Journalist, editor, media executive, political strategist
- Employers: Rand Daily Mail; Montreal Star; The Observer; Global Television Network; Royal Bank of Canada
- Spouses: Susan Lewis (divorced); Gillian Cosgrove (m. 1977)
- Children: 3
- Relatives: Anthony Heard (brother)

Raymond Elliott Heard (December 18, 1935 – October 17, 2026) was a Canadian-South African journalist, editor, media executive and political strategist. He was a contributor to Canada's National Post and the Huffington Post and appeared on the CTV News Channel, CBC News Network, Global News and the defunct Sun News Network as a political pundit.

== Early life and education ==
A white South African by birth, Heard was born in Johannesburg and grew up in Durban. His parents, George and Vida Heard, were liberal journalists. His father, an anti-fascist writer, disappeared in 1945 and was presumed dead. His friends suspected that he had been abducted and murdered by members of the far-right Ossewabrandwag, which he had publicly opposed. Vida raised Heard and his younger brother, Anthony.

Heard was a political reporter for the Rand Daily Mail from 1955 until 1960. On the Mail, he disclosed that liberal members of the opposition United Party would break away to launch the Progressive Party. In 1960, Heard graduated with a BA Hons. in political science at the University of the Witwatersrand (Johannesburg) and then spent a year at Harvard University on a Frank Knox Fellowship, where his teachers included Henry Kissinger and John Kenneth Galbraith. While there, he wrote an article on the political situation in his homeland for The Harvard Crimson in which he described apartheid as "a combination of hatred, fear, and ignorance." Before leaving for Harvard, his last major assignment was covering the aftermath of the Sharpeville massacre, in which South African police killed 69 protesters. His reporting for the Rand Daily Mail included coverage of the Treason Trial of Nelson Mandela and other anti-apartheid activists.

== Career ==
After studying at Harvard, Heard briefly returned to South Africa. With his wife expecting a child, he decided against raising a family under apartheid and sought work in North America. Heard left South Africa in the early 1960s and immigrated to Canada, where he found a job with the Montreal Star. Heard joined the Star in 1962 and was assigned to Washington, D.C., the following year where he served as the newspaper's White House correspondent, and as a correspondent for The Observer of London and the South African Morning Group, from 1963 until 1973, when he became editor of the London Observer Foreign News Service.

During his time in Washington, he covered the presidencies of Lyndon B. Johnson and Richard Nixon, including the Watergate scandal. He also covered the civil rights movement. Heard reported on the 1968 presidential campaign of Robert F. Kennedy and was accompanying Kennedy's entourage when the candidate was assassinated in Los Angeles in June 1968. According to Heard's obituary, he had helped Kennedy write his 1966 Day of Affirmation Address in Cape Town, which became known as the "Ripple of Hope" speech.

In 1976, he returned to the Montreal Star as managing editor, with responsibility for all content, and remained with the newspaper until it closed in 1979 after an 11-month printers' strike.

Heard then moved to the Global Television Network, where he served as vice president, news and current affairs. During Heard's tenure at Global, ratings for its news programmes increased and the network introduced a noon newscast. He left in 1987 following disagreements with the network's owners.

He accepted a position as communications director for Liberal leader John Turner which ended after the Liberals' defeat in the 1988 federal election.

In the mid-1980s, Heard held talks with the Toronto Sun about establishing an English-language tabloid in Montreal, but the proposal did not proceed.

In the 1990s, Heard joined the Royal Bank of Canada as a media consultant and speechwriter for Allan R. Taylor and his successor as chief executive officer, John Cleghorn. He retired after about a decade with the bank but continued working as a media consultant. His clients included Gail Asper, with whom he worked on the development of the Canadian Museum for Human Rights, and real-estate developer Bob Dhillon.

== Later activities ==
Heard later appeared as a political pundit and commentator on the Sun News Network, and was featured in the network's coverage of Nelson Mandela's death in December 2013. Heard discussed his recollections of Mandela on Global News. CTV, CBC, Global, and wrote articles for the National Post and Ottawa Citizen on Mandela and his links with Canada.

He was involved in efforts that led to Mandela being granted honorary Canadian citizenship in 2001, an achievement he regarded as particularly important.

During the 2008 federal election, he endorsed his friend Conservative Peter Kent's successful candidacy for Parliament.

In early 2010, a consortium made up of Heard, Jerry Grafstein, Beryl Wajsman and Diane Francis announced an unsuccessful bid to purchase the National Post, Ottawa Citizen and Montreal Gazette from the financially troubled CanWest media conglomerate.

== Personal life and death ==
Heard married Canadian journalist Gillian Cosgrove in 1977.. Their daughter, Jennifer, a 2010 political science honours graduate from the University of Guelph, died aged 28 in Toronto after a seizure on June 12, 2015. He had two children, Josephine Robson of London and Antony Heard of Ottawa, from his first marriage to Susan Lewis (later Lady Susan Steyn). His son, Antony, died in 2024, aged 59. His brother, Anthony, also predeceased him.

Heard's younger brother, Anthony Heard, remained in South Africa and served as editor-in-chief of the liberal Cape Times for many years until he was dismissed after breaking apartheid laws in 1986 by publishing his interview with Oliver Tambo, the exiled leader of the African National Congress (ANC). When Nelson Mandela became president of South Africa, Anthony Heard served as a senior official in the government, first advising Minister for Water Affairs, Kader Asmal and then later working in the presidency of the Thabo Mbeki administration.

He enjoyed kayaking, skiing and surfing, and maintained a regular fitness routine. He spent time kayaking on Bark Lake in Ontario, skiing in Vermont and surfing in Kauai, Hawaii.

Heard died at Toronto General Hospital, on October 17, 2026, following a stroke. He was 90. His son, Antony, and brother, Anthony, predeceased him. He was survived by his first wife, Susan Lenore Lewis, his second wife, Gillian Cosgrove, his daughter Josephine Robson, and three grandchildren. A celebration of his life was scheduled for November 6, 2026, at Rosedale United Church in Toronto.
