= W. Richmond Smith =

Canadian journalist and New York City employee

W. Richmond Smith (February 26, 1868 – February 19, 1934) was a Canadian journalist and New York City employee.

He was born in Ottawa on February 26, 1868, and became a journalist for the Montreal Evening Star. He was a war correspondent for the Star during the Boer War, and afterwards, during the Russo-Japanese War, he was a correspondent for the AP, UPI, and Reuters. He then worked as city editor for the Star, before moving to the Toronto News, where he was managing editor. He also worked for the Canadian Pacific Railway and as a journalist for the New York Tribune.

From 1910 to 1914 he led New York City's Commission on Standardization of Supplies, and from 1914 to 1917 worked for the city's Bureau of Standards. In 1917 he became president of the Batavia Rubber Company. He was a member of the city's Citizen's Budget Commission for two years in the early 1930s, and in January 1933 became New York City's Deputy Commissioner of Purchase. He was an author of several books, including The Siege and Fall of Port Arthur, about the Russo-Japanese War.
