= Sekunjalo Investments =

South African private equity firm

- Type: Private
- Industry: Diversified investments
- Genre: Private Equity
- Founded: May 1996
- Founder: Iqbal Survé
- Headquarters: South Africa, Cape Town, South Africa
- Subsidiaries: African Equity Empowerment Investments
- Website: sekunjalo.com

African Equity Empowerment Investments
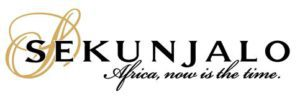
- Type: Public (until April 2024); Private (April 2024 - present)
- Traded as: JSE: AEEI (delisted)
- Industry: Diversified investments
- Genre: Private Equity
- Founded: April 2015
- Headquarters: South Africa, Cape Town, South Africa
- Parent: Sekunjalo Investments
- Subsidiaries: Bioclones (Pty) Ltd, Genius Biotherapeutics, Ribotech, espAfrika, Cape Town International Jazz Festival
- Website: www.aeei.co.za

Sekunjalo Investment Holdings (parent company of African Equity Empowerment Investments) is a South Africa-based private equity firm specializing in acquisitions, PIPEs, and buyouts. It has principal operations in publishing, Internet, fishing, healthcare, pharmaceuticals, telecommunication, financial services, aquaculture, biotechnology, enterprise development, events management, travel. The company was founded by Iqbal Survé and three others in 1996 with the aim of investing and assisting black-owned businesses. Sekunjalo has been involved in the Qatargate corruption scandal in the European Parliament after the Sekunjalo Development Foundation donated €250,000 to the lobbying group Fight Impunity which is accused of bribery.

In April 2015 all of Sekunjalo's investments except its 55% ownership in Independent Media SA was spun-off into a new company, still owned by Sekunjalo Investments, known as African Equity Empowerment Investments (AEEI).

The company is currently facing allegations of corruption and misappropriation of funds from the state-controlled Public Investment Corporation which manages assets on behalf of the Government Employees Pension Fund, leading major banks to cut ties.

In January 2024, the Johannesburg Stock Exchange (JSE) announced that AEEI, as well as its sister company and former subsidiary AYO Technology Solutions, faced possible suspension from the JSE for failing to submit annual financial statements within the stipulated 4-month period.

In February 2024, AEEI shareholders voted to delist from the JSE. The termination of being listed on the JSE was effective on 16 April 2024. As of March 2026, a court judgment ordered Sekunjalo to pay R459 million to a clothing workers union pension fund after it found that Survé had misrepresented terms of a loan contract adjustment and failed to repay the loan.

== Founding ==
Sekunjalo was founded in 1996 by Iqbal Survé, Mohammed Kajee and two others. Three of the founding members sold their shares, with only Survé remaining as the founding shareholder.

In 2006, Sekunjalo subsidiary Bioclones (trading as Genius Biotherapeutics) received an investment of US$5.3 million from BioPAD, the South African Department of Science and Technology's research innovation centre.

== African Equity Empowerment Investments ==
In April 2015, Sekunjalo Investments Limited (SIL) was renamed, African Equity Empowerment Investments (AEEI) to avoid confusion with its parent company, Sekunjalo Investment Holdings (SIH). SIH became a privately held company whilst AEEI took Sekunjalo's publicly traded status on the Johannesburg Stock Exchange (JSE) trading under the ticker AEE. The ownership of subsidiaries was restructured so as to "better reflect the underlying businesses and investments of the Group going forward and to differentiate from the private holding company." Founder Iqbal Survé stepped down from managing all investments held by AEEI so as to focus on the company's media holdings.

=== Premier Fishing ===
In August 2023, AEEI's subsidiary Premier Fishing Ltd delisted from the JSE after a six-year stint on Africa's largest stock exchange. This followed the sale by the government-controlled PIC of its entire 20% stake in Premier Fishing back to the company at a steep loss.

=== Delisting and threat of suspension from stock exchange ===
In October 2023, AEEI announced its intention to delist citing "costs and administrative burden associated with a listing" no longer being warranted following the sale of its stake in former subsidiary and sister company AYO Technology Solutions.

AEEI announced a sharp fall in net assets in December 2023 following the unbundling of AYO Technology Solutions and an alleged cybercrime hit with ZAR 15 million being transferred out of a subsidiary company's bank accounts. According to AEEI, the crime was reported to SAPS and one or more employees may face criminal charges.

AEEI and its former subsidiary AYO Technology Solutions, both subsidiaries of Sekunjalo Investment Holdings, faced suspension from the Johannesburg Stock Exchange (JSE) due to both companies' failure to submit their annual financial statements. AYO was previously fined for 6.5 million rand by the JSE.

In February 2024, AEEI shareholders unanimously voted to delist from the JSE. The final day of trading AEEI shares was set to 9 April 2024.

=== Directors censured ===
Five directors and former directors of AEEI and AYO Technology Solutions have been fined and censured by the JSE, including Survé's brother-in-law Khalid Abdulla. The first to be censured were Mbuso Khosa and Telang Ntsasa who served on AYO's Audit and Risk Committee. Khosa and Ntsasa were censured and banned from serving as JSE directors for publishing false and misleading annual financial statements. Abdul Malick Salie and Naahied Gamieldien, who both served as AYO's CFO at different times, were publicly censured and fined 250 000 rand for breaching the JSE's listing requirements. Khalid Abdulla was censured and fined two million rand for breaching listing requirements and for instructing a fellow director to adjust amounts in AYO's interim results. Abdulla appealed the censure but a judge of the High Court dismissed the appeal. Abdulla's fine was reduced to 1.2 million rand and he resigned as chairman and director of AYO Technology Solutions.

== Independent Media ==
Sekunjalo Independent Media Consortium is a privately owned and separately controlled segment company that is not directly related to the publicly listed African Equity Empowerment Investments segment of the Sekunjalo Investments parent company, however, Independent Media employees were transferred to the payroll of the JSE-listed AYO Technology Solutions, a subsidiary of both Sekunjalo Investment Holdings and AEEI.

Sekunjalo holds 55% ownership of Cape Town-based Independent News and Media South Africa (INMSA) with the remaining ownership made up of Chinese and Public Investment Corporation of South Africa (a South African government owned company). Two Chinese State Owned Enterprises (China International Television Corporation and the China Africa Development Fund) invested R400 million in the deal to acquire 20% of the Newspaper. The Public Investment Corporation of South Africa invested R500 million to acquire a 25% share. The purchase of the South African-based media group from Independent News and Media was concluded in August 2013 for €150-million (R2 billion). Sekunjalo Independent Media's 55% purchase of INMSA was largely funded by a loan from the Public Investment Corporation (PIC) and Government Employees Pension Fund. In an interview with journalist Mandy de Waal in the Daily Maverick, Survé rejected claims that the purchase was politically motivated, insisting that editorial independence would be protected through an advisory board, and argued that the deal was both commercially viable and part of a broader effort to expand black media ownership.

=== Unpaid loans ===
In 2019 Sekunjalo claimed that the PIC and Sekunjalo had come to an amicable agreement for a debt-for-shares swop in 2018, while other sources reported that a large proportion of the PIC's investment in Sekunjalo were written off.

The South African Clothing and Textile Workers Union (SACTWU) has sued Sekunjalo Independent Media in the Western Cape High Court for failing to repay a loan of ZAR 150 million plus interest in aid of funding the purchase of the company from Tony O'Reiley. The PIC has also filed an application asking the court to liquidate Sekunjalo Independent Media.

On 26 March 2026, Sekunjalo Independent Media was ordered by the Supreme Court of Appeal to pay SACTWU an amount of R459 million, plus further interest and legal costs.

=== Editorial interference ===
Survé has been accused of editorial interference at Independent Media and of using transformation to remove credible journalists and editors to replace them with others who write favourably about him and his businesses.

In August 2024, the Press Council found that Independent Media newspapers and news website IOL were being used to advance Sekunjalo's corporate interests. The ruling that ordered IOL to publiush an apology and remove a hate comment article against journalist Karyn Maughan. Surve's posts on X (formerly known as Twitter) were found to have compounded the harm to Maughan, where he had referred to her as a dog.

=== Retrenchments ===
In 2023, Independent Media issued retrenchment notices to its staff for the fifth time since Sekunjalo's purchase of the news organisation. By October, at least a third of staff were let go off and the company failed to pay severance packages on time and instead issued grocery vouchers to the value of ZAR 2500 which initially were not loaded with any cash, forcing shoppers to abandon their groceries at the till.

At the end of 2023, Independent Media's CEO suddenly resigned after 16 months in the job prompting Survé to once again take up an executive role in the company.

== Investments ==
Sekunjalo Independent Media Consortium
- Independent News and Media SA (55% ownership)
  - Independent Online (South Africa)
  - The Star (South Africa)
  - Saturday Star
  - Daily Voice (South African newspaper)
  - Cape Times
  - Cape Argus
  - Weekend Argus
  - Business Report
  - Sunday Independent
  - Pretoria News
  - Weekend Pretoria News
  - The Post
  - Sunday Tribune (South Africa)
  - The Mercury
  - Daily News
  - Diamond Fields Advertiser
  - Isolezwe
  - African News Agency

=== African Equity Empowerment Investments ===
List of Health related investments
- Genius Biotherapeutics (Pty) Ltd: pharmaceutical research and production
- Ribotech: pharmaceuticals (cancer drugs)
- Sekpharma: vitamin supplements and other pharmaceutical products
- Wynberg Pharmaceuticals
List of Technology and Telecoms related investments
- AYO Technology Solutions
List of Marine related investments
- Premier Fishing: fishing
- Marine Growers (Atlantic Abalone): aquaculture - focus on abalone cultivation
List of Strategic Investments

AEEI has strategic investments in the following companies in South Africa:

- British Telecomms South Africa: a South African subsidiary of BT Group - not any longer
- SAAB South Africa: a South African subsidiary of SAAB Group
- Pioneer Foods: processed foods
List of Service sector related investments

AEEI has strategic investments in the following companies in South Africa:

- espAfrika: events management
- Enterprise Development: tourism services

== Bank account closures ==
In 2021 and 2022, banks in South Africa issued notices indicating termination of banking services to the company. Absa, Investec and FNB all closed their accounts with Sekunjalo subsidiaries after the bad press and "reputational risk" that came with the Mpati report. The banks cited the high risk of doing business with the Sekunjalo Group following the publication of an inquiry by Judge Lex Mpati into irregularities at the Public Investment Corporation. The banks' decision in this regard has been fought vehemently by the Sekunjalo Group, most notably by means of a lawsuit in the country's Equality Court, which challenges the discriminatory tactics and dominance of the largest banks in South African's banking sector.

Sekunjalo and Survé have been accused of using newspapers owned by Independent Media and their online news website Independent Online to attack the banking sector as well as to publish articles biased in favour of Survé against the banks.

=== Equality Court case ===
On 18 December 2023, the Supreme Court of Appeal ruled that Nedbank's decision to terminate Sekunjalo's banking services was not based on unfair racial discrimination and that Sekunjalo Group had not provided any evidence in that regard on a prima facie basis.

Sekunjalo appealed to the Constitutional Court, which in September 2024 announced that Sekunjalo's appeal was "dismissed with costs as it bears no reasonable prospects of success". The Court's nine justices unanimously agreed that Sekunjalo had provided no evidence to support its allegations against Nedbank. Nedbank and other banks that were previously interdicted from closing Sekunjalo companies' bank accounts in the interim are now legally permitted to close the bank accounts of more than 200 Sekunjalo-linked companies.

=== Competition case ===
On 19 December 2023, the Competition Tribunal dismissed Sekunjalo's application for an extension of a 2022 interim order seeking to disallow the banks from closing Sekunjalo companies' accounts. Sekunjalo's claim that the banks acted in collusion was shot down by the tribunal.

This followed a July 2023 Competition Appeal Court (CAC) ruling that found the Competition Tribunal had erred in granting an extension in the first place.

The matter remains unresolved as Sekunjalo has vowed to appeal the decisions in the Constitutional Court.

== Controversies ==
=== Sekunjalo Marine Services Consortium tender ===
In December 2011 a Sekunjalo subsidiary, Sekunjalo Marine Services Consortium, was awarded an R800 million (equivalent to roughly US$98 million in 2011) tender for the crewing, management and maintenance of the research and fisheries patrol services.

On 19 February 2012, Mr Pieter van Dalen, the Democratic Alliance member of parliament, lodged a complaint with the Public Protector. To investigate allegation of improper awards of this tender by the Department of Agriculture Forestry and Fisheries. That "the company had submitted four separate bids under different company and consortium names, which were all accompanied by Sekunjalo’s 2010 annual report." Additional concerns were raised over possible conflict of interests that neither the company nor the Department of Agriculture Forestry and Fisheries adequately addressed over one of its holdings, Premier Fishing, also having a fishing licence at the time when the contract was awarded.

On 5 December 2013, the South African Public Protector released its report on accusations that the contract to manage South Africa's fleet of fishing patrol vessels was improperly handled and awarded to Sekunjalo's Marine Service Consortium. The report found that the awarding of the R800 million a year contract was improper and did not comply with the department of Agriculture, Forestry and Fisheries supply-chain management requirements. The Public Protector found that the head of the department's tender evaluation had been "irrational, biased and improper" in its awarding of the bid to Sekunjalo.

In the final report, the Public Protector was unable to find any improper maladministration by the Department of Agriculture Forestry and Fisheries on the allegation that submitting four tenders under the Sekunjalo Group constitute collusive tendering. Therefore, Sekunjalo was cleared of charges of collusion and corruption, the Public Protector referred the matter to the Competition Commission. The Competition Commission found that there was no collusive bidding by four entities of the Sekunjalo Group when they each put in a bid for an R800 million tender.

The contract was previously held by rival marine services firm Smit Amandla Marine until it expired in 2011 and a new bidding process started. Smit Amand Marine complained that its contract bid application had been leaked to Sekunjalo. The contract was initially awarded to Sekunjalo only to withdraw it and instead gave Smit Amandla one month to hand over their operation to the South African Navy. The department then found that the Navy could not properly maintain the fleet of six patrol vessels and issued an emergency tender to Nautic SA and Damen Shipyards.

=== Accusations of undue interference at the Cape Times ===
Right2Know Campaign and other civil society organisations hold a picket outside Newspaper House to protest against the replacement of Cape Times editor Alide Dasnois. Also present at the demonstration are counter-demonstrators (waving printed red, white, and black placards with most members wearing t-shirts from Tripartite Alliance member organisations) demonstrating in favour of the replacement of Dasnois.

On 5 December 2013 former president and struggle hero of South Africa Nelson Mandela passed away. Most newspapers in South Africa, and major international newspaper titles dedicated their front pages to coverage of Mandela's death. Except for Die Burger and the Sekunjalo owned Cape Times which instead led with a special edition that wrapped around the regular edition covering Mandela's death that was regarded by TIME magazine as one of the best covers from around the world on the event. On 6 December 2013, the day after Mandela's death and at the same time other publications were covering the event, the Cape Times led with a front-page article on the Public Protector's report highlighting irregularities in the awarding of the Sekunjalo Marine Services Consortium tender. The same day, the newspaper's editor, Alide Dasnois, was dismissed from her post by Iqbal Survé, executive chairman of Sekunjalo Investments. One of the stated reasons by Survé for Dasnois's dismissal was that Mandela's death was not on the front page of the Cape Times.

Sekunjalo Investments threatened to sue the paper, Dasnois, and journalist Melanie Gosling over the tender story, but Survé has denied that Dasnois' removal was connected to the article. He instead pointed to the title's declining circulation figures as his primary motivation. Compounded loss of sales, between 2008 and 2012, amounted to 28%, he said. The Cape Times is one of the titles in the Sekunjalo owned INMSA stable.

In response to a perceived attack on press freedom, several organizations have issued statements of support for Dasnois and of concern over editorial independence at the Cape Times. These include Index on Censorship, the International Federation of Journalists, the SA Centre for PEN International, the SA National Editors Forum, the Freedom of Expression Institute, and the Right2Know campaign.

In September 2014 Dasnois filed papers in the South African Labour Court for unfair dismissal and for breach of contract. In May 2016 Sekunjalo reached an agreement with Dasnois to settle out of court and issued a statement that acknowledged that Dasnois did not show disrespect to Mandela's legacy and neither was her conduct in any way motivated by racism. Shortly after releasing this statement the Sekunjalo owned Cape Times newspaper ran a story that Dasnois's lawyer claims sought to accuse Dasnois of being disrespectful to Mandela.

=== Accusations of pro-ANC bias ===
In January 2015 the company and its director Iqbal Survé were accused of pro-African National Congress (ANC) political bias in how they operated Independent News and Media SA and its subsidiary newspapers such as the Cape Times. Although there had been lingering concerns over press freedom at Independent Media following Skunjalo's acquisition of the company partly due to the 2014 firing of Cape Times editor Alide Dasnois and partly due to Survé's close relationship with the ANC the catalyst for the accusation was "group Executive Editor Karima Brown and Editor of Opinion and Analysis Vukani Mde's decision to wear ANC colours at an ANC rally." The accusations were first made by former Independent News columnist Max du Preez in his open resignation letter as reasons for his refusal to work for the company any longer.

Karima Brown, the Chief Content Officer of Independent Media replied to Du Preez's resignation letter by rejecting accusations of political bias, as their publications still feature a number of articles critical of the ANC government, claimed that Du Preez had inaccurately accused Schabir Shaik and President Jacob Zuma of pursuing a corrupt relationship, and that Du Preez and those who have supported him were motivated by racism.

Opposition leader Helen Zille stated that Skunjalo's operation of Independent media was an example of state capture that threatens both the independence of the media and the development of democracy in South Africa.

The company was again criticised for its close links with the ANC and of allegedly having an anti-Democratic Alliance (DA) bias in a report on Al-Jazeera in March 2016. The DA for its part was accused of trying to silence criticism from the Cape Times by threatening to cancel the City of Cape Town's subscription to that publication. In the same report the Cape Times rejected any accusation that it or any Sekunjalo owned publication was reporting unfairly towards any opposition political party.

In 2012, prior to the purchase of Independent Media South Africa, Sekunjalo entered into an agreement with the Gupta family (a family best known for their relationship with ANC president Jacob Zuma) owned Oakbay Investments to purchase 50% of the newspaper company after Sekunjalo had completed the purchase from the company's original owner. This agreement fell through and led to a court case being brought against Sekunjalo by Oakbay.

=== Chinese censorship ===
Former Independent Media columnist Azad Essa said that the newspaper cancelled his column immediately after he published a column distributed to a number of Independent Media newspapers critical of China's mass internment of ethnic Uighurs. Essa was also informed that the article he wrote would not be published online. Essa went on to accuse the newspaper group owned by both Sekunjalo and Chinese interests of espousing "sycophantic praise for Chinese investment, lacks critical engagement with the much-ballyhooed BRICS... and fails to ask basic questions on Chinese motives in Africa."

=== Public Investment Corporation investment ===
Spurred on by a series of letters by United Democratic Movement leader Bantu Holomisa, in 2018 President Cyril Ramaphosa established the Public Investment Corporation Commission (aka as the PIC or Mpati Commission) which was chaired by retired Judge Lex Mpati. The commission was set up to investigate allegations of impropriety regarding the Public Investment Corporation.

There were accusations that PIC executives bypassed normal processes to invest R4.3 billion of public money into Sekunjalo Investments subsidiary company AYO Technology Solutions. The Companies and Intellectual Properties Commission (CIPC) instructed the PIC to recoup to recoup the R4.3 billion investment it made into AYO Technology Solutions in 2017 by issuing a Compliance Notice against the board of directors of the Public Investment Corporation (PIC). The notice was declared unlawful by Judge Cornelius van der Westhuizen at the North Gauteng High Court as the PIC was not given a hearing before the issuance of the Compliance Notice.

The PIC Commission of Inquiry Report does not have a heading named "findings" against The Sekunjalo Group, like it does against other companies it investigated in the same report. Hence the Sekunjalo Group took exception to the PIC Commission's report having made unfounded statements in relation to the Group that were not supported by any evidence.

=== Qatargate scandal ===
European Union records have indicated that the Sekunjalo Development Foundation, a philanthropic initiative within Sekunjalo Investements, was recorded the largest donor to a European Union lobbying organisation called Fight Impunity with a donation of €250,000. Fight Impunity has been embroiled in the ongoing Qatargate scandal involving allegations of corruption and improper influence of European Union officials and family members. According to court documents, Survé's foundation was claimed to be the "most important donor". Survé admitted to having made a donation of ZAR 4.5 million to Fight Impunity but denied any wrongdoing on his part.

== See also ==
- List of South African media
- African News Agency
- Independent Online
