= Rugby Heaven =

Website

Rugby Heaven is a rugby union news and commentary website operated by Fairfax Media in Australia and New Zealand. It is hosted on Fairfax's general news websites including the Sydney Morning Herald and Stuff.co.nz.

The website was initially a joint venture by The New Zealand Herald, the Sydney Morning Herald in Australia, Independent Online in South Africa, and the United Kingdom newspaper The Daily Telegraph in the late 1990s.

Fairfax New Zealand was established in 2003 and launched a New Zealand version of Rugby Heaven in July 2007. In 2009 Fairfax merged Rugby Heaven into the Stuff website. The Rugby Heaven App won Fairfax New Zealand the 2011 PANPA News Destination of the Year - Specialty/Niche Site award.
