= Jonathan Ancer =

South African journalist (born 1970)

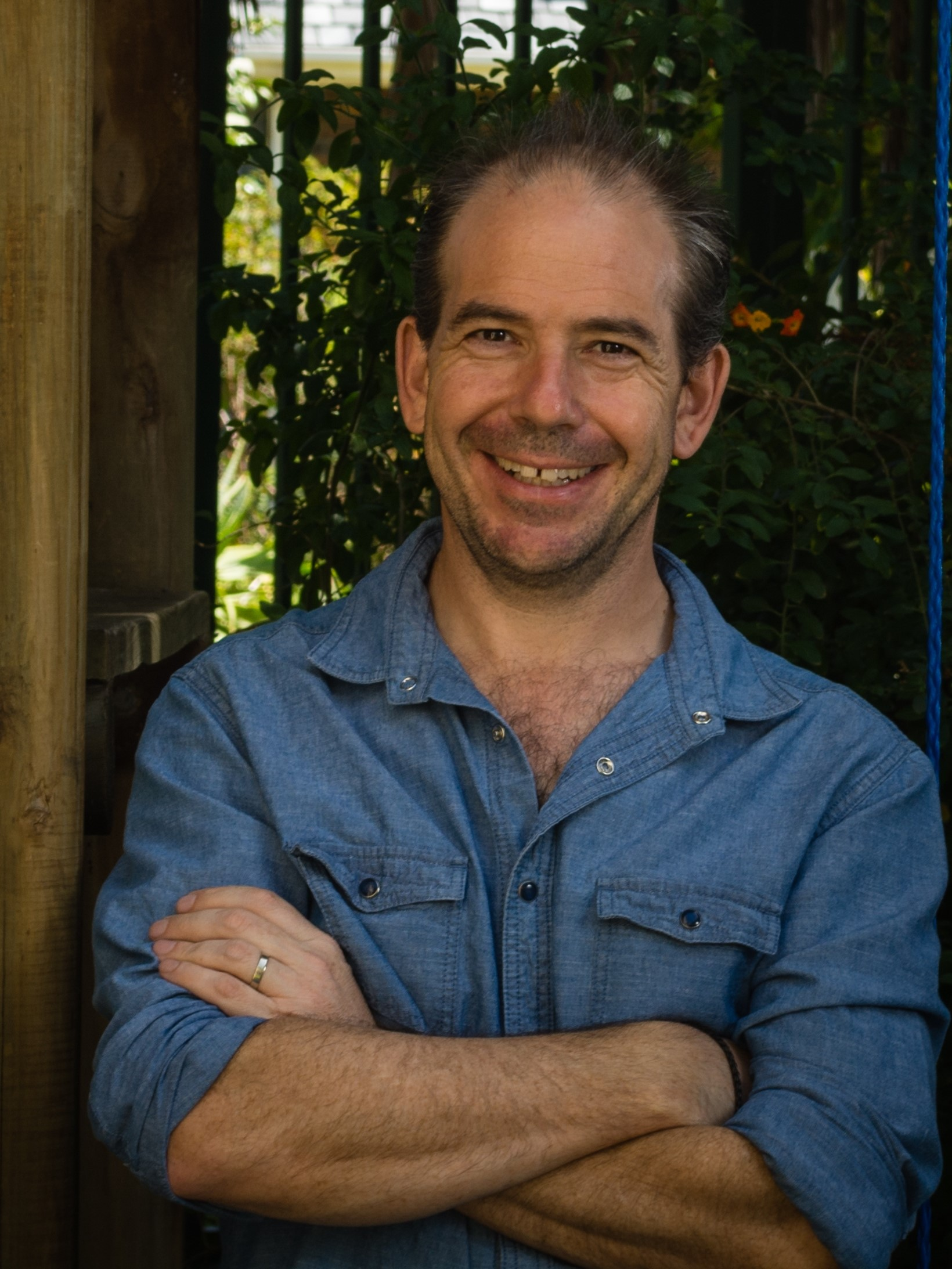
- Born: 1970 (age 55–56); Johannesburg, South Africa
- Education: Wits University (1992), Rhodes University (1995)
- Occupations: Writer, editor, journalist, author, podcaster, media trainer
- Notable work: Betrayal: The Secret Lives of Apartheid Spies, Spy: Uncovering Craig Williamson
- Awards: Media24, Mondi-Shanduka, Alan Paton (longlist)

Jonathan Ancer is a South African journalist, author, podcaster and media trainer. He wrote Uncovering Craig Williamson, which was on the longlist for the Alan Paton literary prize. Ancer wrote Betrayal: The Secret Lives of Apartheid Spies which was released in 2019.

His latest book is Joining The Dots: An Unofficial Biography of Pravin Gordhan (Jonathan Ball Publishers), which he co-wrote with Chris Whitfield.

== Early life ==
Jonathan Ancer was born in Johannesburg, South Africa in 1970. He matriculated from Highlands North Boys High in 1988 and graduated with a BA degree (majoring in Law and Political Studies) from Wits University in 1992. He then completed a Post-Graduate Journalism Diploma from Rhodes University in 1995.

=== Family ===
Jonathan has four children. He is married to Jean Luyt, a clinical psychologist, they live in Cape Town with their three children. In 2015 their middle daughter Rachel was diagnosed with a rare bone marrow failure disease called Pure red cell aplasia (PRCA). After four bone marrow biopsies and more than 50 blood transfusions a donor was found; the chances of finding a genetic match were 1 in 100,000. In 2017 Rachel received a bone marrow transplant; the procedure was a success and today Rachel is a healthy, active young girl thanks to the SA Bone Marrow Registry, The Sunflower Fund and Worldwide Bone Marrow Donors. Rachel wrote a book on her experiences, Rachel's Second Chance(e-book).

== Career ==
=== Author: non-fiction ===
Ancer's most recent book Betrayal: The Secret Lives of Apartheid Spies (NB Publishing) was published in August 2019. It followed his 2017 book Spy: Uncovering Craig Williamson (Jacana Media), which was on the longlist for the Alan Paton literary prize.

=== Journalist/writer/editor ===
Ancer worked as the features editor for Directions magazine from 1996 to 1999 where he wrote profiles and features. He was also the editor of Active, the magazine's adventure supplement. From 1999 to 2006 Ancer worked as a sub-editor, reporter and news editor at The Star Newspaper in Johannesburg. He worked as a sub-editor on the night shift, and as a general news reporter, specialising in narrative journalism on deadline and news features. .

Ancer worked as Grocott's Mail editor from 2006 to 2008, growing the newspaper's circulation. Under his editorship, he saw the paper awarded the country's best small-town newspaper of the year at the Sanlam Awards for Community Journalism.

As deputy of Best Life magazine South Africa from 2008 to 2009, Ancer wrote, commissioned and edited long-form journalism pieces He worked as a deputy editor of Bicycling magazine from 2014 to 2016. He currently works as a freelance journalist contributing articles to the Sunday Times amongst other publications.

He also co-founded the.news.letter – a daily digest of what you need to know.

=== Training and mentoring ===
During his tenure as Editor at Grocotts Mail, Ancer was charged with training and mentoring fourth-year and post-graduate students from Rhodes University's Journalism and Media Studies Department

From 2009 to 2014 Ancer worked for Independent Newspapers as Group Training Editor where he trained editorial staff including junior reporters, senior reporters, news editors and sub-editors. He also set up and ran the group's Cadet School.

In addition, he ran news editor conferences, media law training and narrative journalism workshops. He also wrote op-eds, leaders, news stories and features for newspapers in the Group as well as a weekly satire column that appeared in the Cape Times and Saturday Star called "Angry Utterances (10)". The column was a finalist in the national newspaper awards two years in a row.

During this time he sat on the executive committee of the South African National Editors’ Forum (SANEF) and from 2010 to 2014 chaired SANEF's Training & Education subcommittee. He now provides writing and media training on a freelance basis.

=== Podcaster ===
Ancer has produced and produces numerous podcasts: These include Extraordinary Lives, a biographical series about people who have made South Africa a better (and more interesting) place. He also created Amabookabooka, a podcast series featuring South African authors which were hosted by the Daily Maverick; the podcasts were also published by Okay Africa, a digital media platform dedicated to African culture, music and politics.

== Awards and honours ==
- 2013: Finalist in the Columns category, Standard Bank Sikuvile Journalism Awards.
- 2012: Finalist in the Columns category and commended in the Features category at the Standard Bank Sikuvile Journalism Awards for a five-part narrative series titled, The Adventures of an Awol Chequebook.
- 2011: Winner Media 24 Magazine Excellence award, Proudly South African category.
- 2007: Grocott's Mail was voted the country's best small town newspaper of the year under his editorship. He also placed second in the Editorial Comment section and third in the Columns section.
- 2006: Finalist in the Columns section at the Sanlam Awards for Community Journalism.
- 2004: Winner in the Breaking News category and finalist in the Features category at the Mondi-Shanduka Newspaper Awards.
- 2001: Finalist in the Leisure category at the Mondi Magazine Awards.

== Selected works ==
=== Books ===
- "Mensches in the Trenches: Jewish Foot Soldiers In The Anti-Apartheid Struggle" (Batya Bricker Book Projects February 2022) (ISBN 9780620946940)
- Joining The Dots: An Unofficial Biography of Pravin Gordhan (Jonathan Ball Publishers September 2021), (Co-authored with Chris Whitfield). ISBN 9781776191055
- Betrayal: The Secret Lives of Apartheid Spies (NB Publishing August 2019). ISBN 9780624083900
- Spy: Uncovering Craig Williamson (Jacana Media). ISBN 9781431421497
- "The Victor within: an extraordinary story of optimism, tenacity and sheer determination" by Victor Vermeulen & Jonathan Ancer (Tenacity Publications, 2000), ISBN 9780620264853

=== Articles ===
- Olivia Forsyth: The spy who never came in from the cold. Daily Maverick 2019
- Adventures of an AWOL Chequebook
- 'Let this be my grave.' Cape Argus 2005
- 'Hell no, we won't go!' Mail & Guardian 2008
- Anti-apartheid activist Tim Jenkin looks back on great escape. Sunday Times 2020 (Paywall).
- 'Life is wonderful': Denis Goldberg on the eve of his 85th birthday. Sunday Times 2018.
- Ride The Fury Road – The Mark Cavendish Story. Men's Health 2018.

=== Podcasts ===
- Amabookabooka: The Quarantine Chronicles
- The Homebru Podcasts (with Dan Dewes).
