= Cyril Karabus =

South African oncologist (1935–2026)

- Born: 1 April 1935
- Died: 9 June 2026 (aged 91)
- Occupation: Paediatric oncologist
- Criminal charges: Manslaughter; forgery
- Criminal penalty: Three years imprisonment; 100,000 AED (250,000 South African rand) fine
- Criminal status: Guilty (2004); Acquitted (2013)
- Children: 5
- Relatives: Michael Bagraim (cousin-in-law)

Cyril Karabus (1 April 1935 – 9 June 2026) was a South African paediatric oncologist. He was initially well-recognised in South Africa for his work with black cancer patients during apartheid. In 2012, Karabus gained international attention after he was detained in the United Arab Emirates, where (eight years earlier and without his knowledge) he had been convicted in absentia of manslaughter and forgery. Following boycotts in South Africa against the UAE, and pressure from the South African government, the UAE acquitted him of all charges in March 2013, and he returned to South Africa in May of that year.

== Early life and career ==
Karabus was born on 1 April 1935. A paediatric oncologist, He was well-recognised in his native South Africa for his work for black cancer patients during the apartheid. He treated cancer and blood diseases at the Red Cross War Memorial Children's Hospital for over 35 years, where he founded the paediatric oncology unit. He also trained doctors at the University of Cape Town. He had five children and was Jewish.

== Convictions in absentia ==
In October 2002, while acting as a locum in Abu Dhabi for a period of six weeks, Karabus treated a three-year-old Yemeni girl with acute myeloid leukemia at Sheikh Khalifa Medical City. Karabus had been supplementing his government pension with temporary jobs such as the one in Abu Dhabi. According to Karabus, the girl's parents refused a bone marrow transplant, and the girl instead went through two rounds of chemotherapy, following which she had a brain hemorrhage and died under his care. A few weeks later, Karabus went back to Cape Town after, according to him, his contract ended. His charge sheet listed him as a fugitive.

The family of the girl said that a nurse at the hospital told them Karabus did not give the girl the platelet transfusion she needed, which contributed towards the hemorrhage. She also allegedly told them that Karabus had falsified records to show she had been given the platelets. Karabus was convicted of forgery and manslaughter in absentia on 23 March 2004, something he was unaware of until his arrest years later. He was to serve three years imprisonment and pay a fine of 100,000 AED (250,000 South African rand) as blood money.

== Arrest ==
On 17 August 2012, Karabus had a layover at the Zayed International Airport. He was returning to South Africa from his son's Canadian wedding. When he was boarding his flight from Toronto to Abu Dhabi, Emirates Airlines staff informed him that he had a "security alert" on his passport, but did not give him further information. On 18 August, while boarding the flight from Abu Dhabi to South Africa, he was arrested. Karabus only became aware of his manslaughter conviction in absentia following the arrest. Though his family travelling with him wanted to remain in the nation to be with Karabus, their requests to renew their day visas were denied and they boarded the flight.

Karabus was imprisoned at Al Wathba Prison, and later described the conditions as "not too bad". He stayed in the prison for 57 days. The case was postponed 13 times over an eight-month period, and he made five appearances in his trial, after which he was released on bail for a retrial. Karabus was assisted by the labour lawyer Michael Bagraim; Bagraim's wife was Karabus's cousin. Following a slow legal process, Bagraim decided to pressure the government through lobbying and emailing news organisations about the detention. Soon after, a petition was set up by two unrelated people, bringing attention to the case.

== International response to his detention ==
On 16 April 2013, the Health Professions Council of South Africa (HPCSA) withdrew from the Africa Health Exhibition scheduled to take place from 7 to 9 May in Johannesburg to protest Karabus's detention. The organiser of the Africa Health Exhibition, Informa Life Sciences Exhibitions, was headquartered in Dubai. The South African Medical Association released a statement three days later in support of the HPCSA, calling the UAE's treatment of the case "inhumane".

Ethics bodies within South African medical institutions, including the Professional Ethics and Standards Committee at the University of the Witwatersrand's Faculty of Health Sciences and the University of Cape Town's Medical School, publicly condemned the UAE and endorsed the imposition of sanctions. This prompted healthcare organisations, such as the KwaZulu-Natal Managed Care Coalition and the Independent Practitioners Foundation, to withdraw their backing of the Africa Health Exhibition. In response, a number of academics chose to pull out of the event in protest and in solidarity with Karabus, resulting in the deferment of several specialist sessions, including those in obstetrics, gynaecology, paediatrics, nursing, and sports medicine. The World Medical Association condemned Karabus's detention and the manner in which he was being treated, and cautioned doctors considering working in the UAE. Following backlash, Informa Life Sciences Exhibitions edited their website to stop displaying the address of their headquarters some time between April and May.

The South African government also joined in pressuring the UAE for Karabus's release. Concerns centered around Karabus's health while imprisoned due to his old age, and whether he would be granted a fair trial. People protested for Karabus's release in several places, including at the 2013 Men's Ice Hockey World Championships.

== Acquittal, release and aftermath ==
The physician who had been in charge of the girl prior to Karabus obtained a clinical record which indicated that the girl's platelet level had increased from 1000 to 19000 the day before her hemorrhage, contradicting the claim that he failed to do the transfusion. Karabus and his legal team faced several setbacks, including that the documents provided were photocopies, and that the Higher Committee for Medical Liability did not have any haematologists nor oncologists on the board. On 6 December 2012, the prosecution failed for the second time to provide the notes made during the girl's final two weeks.

Karabus was then aided by the South African businessman Iqbal Survé, who was a former pupil of his and had business relations with the Abu Dhabi royal family, which secured his acquittal and sped up the process. Survé appealed directly to Mohamed bin Zayed Al Nahyan. On 19 March 2013, the Committee cleared Karabus of any wrongdoing. After he was found not guilty two days later, his passport was taken by government authorities to process an appeal made by the prosecution, keeping him in the UAE against his will. The prosecution lost its appeal on 24 April.

He was allowed to leave the country in May 2013 and went to Cape Town. He was greeted by his family and his supporters on his arrival at Cape Town International Airport. Following his release, Karabus gave several speeches for charity organisations, and for his former employer, the Red Cross War Memorial Children's Hospital. For his efforts, Survé received the "services to the medical profession" award at a ceremony hosted by the South African Medical Association. In 2014, Suzanne Belling wrote a book on Karabus's imprisonment, titled Blood Money – The Cyril Karabus Story, which was published by Jacana Media.

== Death ==
Karabus died on 9 June 2026, at the age of 91.
