= News24 (website) =

English-language South African online news publication

- Trusted News. First.

- Type: Continuous digital news
- Format: Online newspaper
- Owner: Media24
- Founder: Naspers
- Publisher: Ben Viljoen
- Editor-in-chief: Adriaan Basson
- Founded: October 1998; 28 years ago
- Language: English
- Headquarters: Cape Town, South Africa
- Country: South Africa
- Sister newspapers: Netwerk24; Daily Sun
- Website: news24.com

News24 is a South African English-language digital news platform. Owned by Media24, a subsidiary of major mass media company Naspers, News24 is the largest subscription-led news website in Africa.

Headquartered in the Media24 Centre in Cape Town, News24 comprises over 100 journalists, and has operations in other cities including Johannesburg, Pretoria, Durban, and Gqeberha. Its editorial team is led by editor-in-chief Adriaan Basson.

== History ==
News24 was established in October 1998 by mass media company Naspers, as part of the company's internet strategy under then-CEO Koos Bekker.

The company was launched during the early days of the Internet, and quickly became one of South Africa's most-recognized digital media platforms. The platform initially focused on breaking local news while relying on wire services for international coverage.

Arrie Rossouw was appointed News24's first publisher. Initially based in Johannesburg, the platform relocated to Cape Town in 2001 to integrate into the newly formed Media24 Digital division under Russell Hanly. This move was part of a broader restructuring of Media24's digital operations, which also saw the News24 team reduced from 30 to 18 employees, with Douw Steyn as business manager and Cobus Heyl as editor.

In April 2020, News24 launched a revamped mobile and desktop website, introducing a free subscription option that included access to 20 newsletters, personalised traffic alerts, weather forecasts, and bookmarked articles. This marked a significant step in adapting to South Africa's growing mobile-first audience.

In July 2025, major South African e-commerce store Takealot, also owned by Naspers, began including a free subscription to News24 as part of its TakealotMORE subscription service.

In November 2025, News24 had a team of over 100 journalists based across Cape Town, Johannesburg, Pretoria, Durban, and Gqeberha.

== Digital subscriptions ==
News24 launched a paid digital subscription service on 8 August 2020, offering investigative journalism, opinion and analysis while keeping breaking news free. News24 surpassed 100,000 paying subscribers in January 2024 and by June 2025 reported more than 110,000 subscribers.

== Editorial approach and initiatives ==
The Reuters Institute's Digital News Report identified News24 as South Africa's most trusted news brand for seven consecutive years, from 2018 to 2025. In February 2025, News24 launched a full-time “Disinformation Desk” focused on fact-checking and combating misinformation.

== Audience ==
According to News24, citing Google Analytics, the site had approximately 6.6 million monthly users in June 2025. Independent IAB South Africa audience data, reported by MyBroadband, placed News24 at the top of South Africa's online news publications by daily active users and monthly page views in May 2024.

News24's audience leans slightly male – about 55% men to 45% women – with its biggest age group being 55–64. Its main competitors are IOL, TimesLIVE, Daily Maverick, The Citizen, EWN, BusinessTech, SABC News, The South African, eNCA and Moneyweb.

== Content and platforms ==
News24 publishes across news, business, sport, lifestyle and entertainment. It also serves as a digital hub for several Media24 English-language titles: a 2015 migration moved numerous English newspaper sites into the 24.com network (to News24), and subscription access includes journalism from City Press, YOU, DRUM and True Love. In 2023, WAN-IFRA named News24 “Best News Website” at the Digital Media Awards Africa.

== Reader comments and moderation ==
News24 has faced criticism over the content of comments posted by users of its website. In September 2015, News24 temporarily disabled comments on most articles. Its editor-in-chief, Andrew Trench, said that comments were increasingly drifting towards hate speech and prejudice, while Daily Maverick reported that the site was receiving around 5,000 comments a day and had become known for attracting hateful comments.

In a 2018 retrospective, News24 editor-in-chief Adriaan Basson described the pre-2015 comment section as having become “a bit of a cesspit for racists and any kind of phobes.” He said discussions could degenerate into racial fights even when the underlying article was innocuous, and that trolls had dominated the comments.

News24 writer Laura Shortridge also described receiving severe personal abuse in the comment section, particularly on articles concerning sexism and racism, including comments wishing violence and death upon her.

News24 later reintroduced article comments with a new moderation system in 2020. Its commenting policy prohibits racist, sexist, offensive and abusive comments and other forms of hate speech, and states that comments may be removed and users banned for violating the policy.

News24 explicitly said that its previous system lacked sophisticated AI and that humans had to delete every non-compliant comment. When comments returned in 2020, its Coral system automatically flagged “banned and toxic comments and words” for human review, including hateful and discriminatory material.

Examples of discriminatory commentary have subsequently been reported. In 2022, Cape Times reproduced a comment posted on a News24 article in June 2021 concerning allegations of racism at a South African school. In August 2026, the South African Jewish Report reported that News24 coverage of a fatal fire in Sea Point attracted antisemitic comments from readers. The report described comments invoking antisemitic conspiracy theories about Jewish control of the media and other comments directed at the Jewish community.
