= Don Macpherson (journalist) =

Canadian journalist

Don Macpherson (born 1947) is a Canadian journalist. He was the Quebec affairs columnist for the Montreal Gazette. He has covered Quebec political affairs since 1985. He retired in 2020; his final column was published on December 18 of that year.

Macpherson, who is of Scottish origin, was raised in the Montreal neighbourhood of Rosemont. He attended McGill University and wrote for The McGill Daily.

He began his journalistic career in the 1960s with The Canadian Press, where he was, he says, often assigned to cover the riots. He later covered Quebec politics for The Montreal Star and the Canadian Broadcasting Corporation before joining The Gazette.
