= Enemy of the People (book) =

Book by Adriaan Basson and Pieter du Toit

Enemy of the People: How Jacob Zuma stole South Africa and how the people fought back
- Author: Adriaan Basson; Pieter du Toit
- Language: English
- Subject: Jacob Zuma, David van Rooyen Corruption in South Africa, Gupta family, Politics of South Africa
- Genre: Non-fiction
- Published: Cape Town
- Publisher: Jonathan Ball Publishers
- Publication date: 1 November 2017
- Publication place: South Africa
- Pages: 360
- ISBN: 978-1-86842-818-2

Enemy of the People: How Jacob Zuma stole South Africa and how the people fought back (2017) is a book by Adriaan Basson and Pieter du Toit, political journalists from South Africa about the creation by President Jacob Zuma of a patronage network embedded in the South African government; the process of state capture that took place under Zuma's leadership; those that supported Zuma and those that resisted. The book's publisher Jonathan Ball Publishers describes it as the "first definitive account of Zuma’s catastrophic misrule." The book covers scandals such as the attempt by the Gupta family, on behalf of Jet Airways, to force the state owned carrier South African Airways to relinquish its air route between Johannesburg and Mumbai through the appointment of compliant government ministers.
