= Tenderpreneur =

South African business practice

In South Africa, a tenderpreneur is a person in government or the private sector who obtains private or government tenders and contracts to facilitate outsourced services. The word tenderpreneur is a portmanteau of "tendering" and "entrepreneur". Some commentators believe that this practice might give rise to a kleptocracy as a deviant mutation of a democracy if left unchecked. In this regard a kleptocracy is defined as the condition arising when a political elite manipulates the three arms of government (legislative, executive and judicial) with the intention of capturing resources that will enrich that elite, a general phenomenon known as elite capture.

Tenderpreneurship is often accomplished by overpricing and/or shoddy workmanship and/or excessive 'under the table' advances termed "commissions".

The Star, a South African newspaper, describes a tenderpreneur as "someone politically well-connected who has got rich through the government tendering system". In January 2010, South African Communist Party leader Blade Nzimande called for transparency in the awarding of tenders, saying "let's be bold, let's go and promote small entrepreneurs and defeat tenderpreneurs, those who steal." The case involving the Gupta family and their close ties to the administration of president Jacob Zuma can be classified as tenderpreneurism.

== See also ==
- Corruption in South Africa
