= African News Agency =

News agency based in South Africa

The African News Agency (ANA) is a news and content syndication service, focusing on news about Africa written by Africans for an African and international audience.

ANA was launched in Cape Town in February 2015 by Sekunjalo Investments and Independent Media chairman, Iqbal Survé, and the chairman of the Pan African Business Forum, Ladislas Agbesi, following the liquidation of the South African Press Association (SAPA), previously a major supplier of foreign and domestic news in South Africa.

Since inception, ANA has been embroiled in various scandals together with its parent company Sekunjalo and controversial founder Iqbal Survé. ANA's impartiality was questioned following the confirmation of R 20 million paid to the company by South Africa's intelligence agency to publish articles that favourably portrayed then-President Jacob Zuma.

== Controversies ==
=== Failure to launch ===
ANA raised US$165 million within two years of inception, which valued the company at US$1.1 billion in 2017. The company was headquartered in Cape Town with ownership structures in tax havens Switzerland and Mauritius. The company stated its intention to open bureaus in New York, London, Dubai and Shanghai, however, this did not occur, and the company remained operational only in South Africa with 26 staff.

By 2019, ANA issued retrenchment notices to its remaining 24 employees, 14 of whom would be let go. Despite its low operational costs, large cash reserves and billion-dollar valuation, ANA was unable to cover staff salaries, and instead claimed to be in the process of opening bureaus in Kenya, Nigeria and Egypt. To date, ANA remains operational in South Africa only.

=== Executive departures ===
In September 2019, ANA's chief financial officer Lisa de Villiers resigned, shortly before staff were issued with retrenchment notices. Grant Fredericks, ANA's CEO, also suddenly resigned a few days later early in October 2019.

Valentine Dzvova was named acting CEO of ANA. Dzvova was previously a financial manager at sister company and Sekunjalo subsidiary Independent Media.

Lindiz van Zilla, editor-in-chief, exited the company at the end of November 2019, along with most other employees who took severance packages.

=== Divorce settlement ===
Court documents indicate that in August 2016, ANA made a payment of ZAR 25 million to Iqbal Survé's personal bank account. Nedbank queried the payment and Survé's sister, Aziza Amod, who serves as a Sekunjalo executive and sits on various boards of Sekunjalo subsidiaries, referred to the payment as "Dr MI Survé: spouse settlement" to which the bank inquired as to why a divorce payment was covered by ANA. Survé in turn responded that his sister did not mention a divorce settlement and that ANA did not cover the costs for "any divorce settlement". According to Survé the funds made up an inter-company loan, however, the bank was not satisfied with this explanation as the amount of ZAR 25 million was paid to Survé's personal bank account.

=== State capture ===
In February 2021 during testimony at The Judicial Commission of Inquiry into Allegations of State Capture, Sydney Mufamadi testified that the State Security Agency (South Africa) had paid R20 million to ANA to publish articles that positively portray then-President Jacob Zuma. The payments were confirmed by current ANA CEO Vasantha Angamuthu, however, she denied any wrongdoing on ANA's part. Angamuthu emphasised that ANA was neither aware of any sinister motive by the SSA nor did they participate in any business outside of the company's key focus, i.e. driving growth and development on the African continent using media. The final Zondo report was released on 22 June 2022 and made no adverse findings against ANA.

== See also ==
- Africanews
- Independent Online
