= Die Matie =

- Type: Biweekly
- Founded: August 1, 1941
- Circulation: 5 000
- Website: www.diematie.com

Die Matie is a student newspaper at the Stellenbosch University (SU). Founded in 1941, Die Matie follows a two-week publishing cycle during the academic term. The editorial content includes sections on news, student life, sport, arts and entertainment, and current affairs. The entire production of Die Matie – from photos, articles and advertisements to page layout and distribution – is managed by the editorial staff; all students. It can be accessed online.

Die Matie adheres to the Press Code of South Africa and therefore "enjoys the same freedoms as the general press in South Africa" under the SU Student Constitution and the Constitution of the South African Republic.

== History ==
On August 1, 1941, the first issue of Die Matie student newspaper was published in Stellenbosch. Its first Editor-in-Chief was W.A. Joubert (not to be confused with the Rev. W.A. Joubert).

=== List of editors ===
| Year | Editor-in-Chief |
|---|---|
| 1941 | W.A. Joubert |
| 1942 | P.A. Theron |
| 1943 | P.A. Theron |
| 1944 | H.S. Marais |
| 1945 | H.S. Marais |
| 1946 | G.J. Roux |
| 1947 | |
| 1948 | |
| 1949 | Pieter de Kock |
| 1950 | Sas Strauss |
| 1951 | Jacobus Olivier |
| 1952 | Con Botha |
| 1953 | Jozua van der Lugt |
| 1954 | Jan Vosloo |
| 1955 | Dreyer de Kock |
| 1956 | Jozua van der Lugt |
| 1957 | Wouter Jordaan |
| 1958 | Rufus Dercksen |
| 1959 | Coenie Slabber |
| 1960 | Deon du Plooy |
| 1961 | Bernhard Louw |
| 1962 | Koos Marais |
| 1963 | Kobus Hattingh |
| 1964 | Andreas van Wyk |
| 1965 | Frits Gaum |
| 1966 | Ernst Lombard |
| 1967 | Jan Kristen |
| 1968 | Dirk Hertzog |
| 1969 | Etienne de Villiers |
| 1970 | Johann S. Verreynne |
| 1971 | Chris Otto |
| 1972 | Gerrie de Villiers |
| 1973 | Cobus Stofberg |
| 1974 | Altus Joubert |
| 1975 | Koos Bekker |
| 1976 | Freddie Marais |
| 1977 | Etienne van Heerden |
| 1978 | Chris Heymans |
| 1979 | Louis Heyneman |
| 1980 | Kobus Pienaar |
| 1981 | Coenraad Pieterse |
| 1982 | Ian Theron |
| 1983 | Jacques Joubert |
| 1984 | Corinne Oosthuizen |
| 1985 | Anton Steenkamp |
| 1986 | Eric le Grange |
| 1987 | Stephan Malherbe |
| 1988 | Daan Mostert |
| 1989 | Cornis van der Lugt |
| 1990 | Dries Liebenberg |
| 1991 | Julia Anderssen |
| 1992 | Monté Maritz |
| 1993 | Melissa Fourie |
| 1994 | Willem Kempen |
| 1995 | Marius de Jager |
| 1996 | Liza Albrecht |
| 1997 | Albertus van Wyk |
| 1998 | Jearelle Wolhuter |
| 1999 | Michael Hatton |
| 2000 | Waldimar Pelser |
| 2001 | Jacolette Kloppers |
| 2002 | Adriaan Basson |
| 2003 | Johan van Tiddens |
| 2004 | Gustav Malan |
| 2005 | Rika Vollgraaff |
| 2006 | Andre-Pierre du Plessis |
| 2007 | Annelie Maré |
| 2008 | Pieter-Francois Theron |
| 2009 | Saskia Barnard |
| 2010 | Annelize Kloppers |
| 2011 | Marietjie de Vos |
| 2012 | Anika Marais |
| 2013 | Jaco du Plessis |
| 2014 | Christine de Kock |
| 2015 | Gerard Swart |
| 2016 | Eugenie Gregan |
| 2017 | |
| 2018 | |
| 2019 | |
| 2020 | Lian van Wyk |
| 2021 | Carla Briers |
| 2022 | Tiaan Booyens |
| 2023 | Aurelia Mouton |
| 2024 | Emma Hammand |
| 2025 | Jani Roux |
| 2026 | Emma Giles |
| 2027 | Jana Burger |

== Distribution ==
Today, Die Matie is mainly published online on its website. However, hard-copy editions are sometimes still printed and distributed on special occasions, such as Welcoming (SU's orientation period in February), milestone birthdays of Die Matie, or elections, on the main SU campus of Stellenbosch. On 12 August 2026, Die Matie distributed its 85th anniversary edition.

Die Matie has an estimated readership of 33 000 students, as well as staff and Stellenbosch residents.

Die Matie has Instagram, Facebook and TikTok and YouTube accounts. On these social media platforms, Die Matie shares updates about new articles, makes announcements related to campus news or shares short-form videos covering campus events. Die Matie also engages with readers via its Rooiplein Report video series on Instagram and TikTok, in which Die Matie's social media team asks students their opinions on various student-life topics.

== Structure ==
Die Matie team includes journalists, photographers, a social media team and the main editorial team. The main editorial members are the Editor-in-Chief, Managing Editor, Head Reporter, Head of Policy and Archives, Content Editor, Sub-Editors (for English, Afrikaans and isiXhosa), Page Editors (News, Student Life, Dag & Nag and Sport), Layout and Website Online Editor, Social Media Online Editor, Treasurer, Events and Merch Manager, and IT Manager.

A news cycle at Die Matie includes a bi-weekly news meeting and a bi-weekly feedback session in the next week, called a "post-mortem" because the team then dissects the previous edition to learn what worked and what could improve in the next cycle.

Die Matie has pages for News, Student Life, Dag & Nag (arts and entertainment), and Sport. Each page has an assigned Page Editor who collects article pitches for each cycle, guides journalists, checks the articles to make sure they are appropriate for the page, and makes sure there are photos for each article. Die Matie also occasionally publishes editorial letters and opinion pieces submitted from the public.

At the end of the main editorial's term, a new Editor-in-Chief is elected by the Die Matie team.

== Financing ==
Although Die Matie receives a small subsidy from SU's Student Affairs Department and the Die Matie Alumni Trust for printing costs and some of the office upkeep, the paper also collects income through advertisements on its website and social media platforms. Advertising is the responsibility of Die Matie's Treasurer, Events and Merch Manager (also a student and member of the editorial team).

== See also ==
- List of newspapers in South Africa
- MFM 92.6, Stellenbosch University's radio station
