= Tony Heard =

South African journalist and government advisor (1937–2024)

- Born: Anthony Hazlitt Heard; 20 November 1937; Johannesburg, South Africa
- Died: 27 March 2024 (aged 86); Cape Town, South Africa
- Education: Durban High School; University of Cape Town (B.A.)
- Occupations: Journalist, author, government advisor
- Spouse(s): Valerie Joy Heard, Mary Ann Barker, Jane Porter
- Children: 4
- Relatives: Raymond Heard (brother)
- Writing career
- Genre: Non-fiction
- Subject: Apartheid
- Notable awards: Pringle Award (1985), Golden Pen of Freedom Award (1986), Allan Kirkland Soga Lifetime Achievement Award (2022)

Anthony Hazlitt Heard (20 November 1937 – 27 March 2024) was a South African journalist, author and government advisor. He is best known for his journalism covering apartheid, most notably interviewing African National Congress (ANC) leader Oliver Tambo in 1985 at a time when it was banned by the South African government. After the country's transition to a new democratic South Africa, Heard became an adviser in the presidency, serving until 2010.

== Early life and education ==
Tony Heard was born on 20 November 1937 in Johannesburg, South Africa, to George and Vida Heard (née Stodden), both journalists. His brother, Raymond Heard, is a Canadian journalist. His father was an anti-fascist political journalist at a time when fascism was on the rise globally in the run-up to World War II. South Africa's entry into the war on the side of the Allies was controversial in country where significant pro-fascist feelings were present among Afrikaner nationalists. His father mysteriously disappeared in 1945; the Heard family believes he was murdered by the Ossewabrandwag for his political beliefs.

Heard matriculated from Durban Boys High in 1954, after which he spent a year in London learning shorthand and typing. In 1955 he returned to South Africa and started work as a journalist while studying journalism part-time at the University of Cape Town, graduating with a Bachelor of Arts degree. He married Valerie Joy Heard (née Hermanson), a graduate from the University of Cape Town's College of Music. They had two daughters. Heard later married Mary Ann Barker with whom he had two children.

== Career ==
Following his return to South Africa in 1955, Heard was employed as a journalist at the Cape Times in Cape Town. He became a parliamentary reporter for the Cape Times in 1958 and then a political correspondent.

Heard covered the anti-pass march in Langa, Cape Town, led by Pan Africanist Congress leader Philip Kgosana on 30 March 1960. He was appointed editor of the Cape Times in 1971.

=== Tambo interview ===
In 1985, Heard took leave and traveled to the United Kingdom where he interviewed the then banned leader of the ANC, Oliver Tambo.

His interview with Tambo was published in the Cape Times under the heading "A Conversation with Oliver Tambo of the ANC,” was an important event in South African history. It allowed the ANC to articulate its vision of a non-racial South Africa to the public, thereby alleviate fears held by White South Africans for a post-apartheid South Africa, and ultimately helped created the political conditions for the negotiated settlement that ended apartheid and established a non-racial democratic government.

Following the interview Heard was arrested and released on bail for contravening the Internal Security Act with the case against him eventually being dropped by the government. He won the Golden Pen Award of Freedom from the World Association of Newspapers for the interview.

=== Later career ===
In March 1986, Heard investigated and exposed the killing of seven anti-apartheid activists in Gugulethu known as the Gugulethu Seven. Heard was sacked from the Cape Times in 1987 after refusing a R1 million (equivalent to R15,000,000 in 2018) offer to resign that contained a clause that, Heard argued, would have effectively muzzled him following the Tambo interview.

Following his departure from the Cape Times, Heard temporarily moved to the United States where he became a Nieman Fellow and was a Visiting Fulbright Fellow at University of Arkansas. After the transition to democracy, he served in the administration of Nelson Mandela as a senior official, first advising the Minister for Water Affairs, Kader Asmal and then later working in the presidency of the Thabo Mbeki administration. His journalist daughter, Janet, followed in his footsteps as a Nieman Fellow at Harvard University in 2009/2010.

== Death ==
Heard died in Cape Town following a brief illness on 27 March 2024.

== Awards ==
- 1985: Pringle Award from the South African Society of Journalists
- 1986: Golden Pen of Freedom Award given by the World Association of Newspapers' in recognition of "the outstanding action, in writing or deed, of an individual, a group or an institution in the cause of press freedom"
- 2022: Allan Kirkland Soga Lifetime Achievement Award at the Standard Bank Sikuvile Awards, organised by the South African National Editors' Forum (SANEF)

== List of books ==
- The Cape of Storms : a personal history of the crisis in South Africa. Fayetteville: University of Arkansas Press. 1990. ISBN 1557281688.
- 8000 DAYS: Mandela, Mbeki and beyond: The inside story of an editor in the corridors of power. Missing Ink. 2019. ISBN 978-0-639-84040-6.

== External references ==
- O. R. Tambo Interviewed by Anthony Heard, October 1985 (Cape Times), transcript available on South African History Online
