= Adriaan Basson =

South African journalist

- Born: Adriaan Jurgens Basson
- Education: Brackenfell High School; Stellenbosch University
- Occupation: Investigative journalist
- Years active: 2003–present
- Awards: Taco Kuiper Award for Investigative Journalism

Adriaan Jurgens Basson is a South African journalist who has been the editor-in-chief of News24 since April 2016. Known for his investigative journalism, he was formerly the editor of Netwerk24 and Beeld.

== Career ==
After matriculating at Brackenfell High School in 1999, Basson attended Stellenbosch University, where he was editor of Die Matie in 2002. He began his career in 2003 as a reporter at Beeld, an Afrikaans daily newspaper. Thereafter he spent three years as an investigative reporter at the Mail & Guardian, where, with Sam Sole and Stefaans Brümmer, he was one of three founding members of amaBhungane in 2010.

He went on to become assistant editor at City Press. During this period, in 2011, he was named one of the Mail & Guardian's 200 Young South Africans. He left City Press on 1 October 2013 to return to Beeld as editor. In September 2015 he was appointed as editor of Netwerk24, another Afrikaans-language publication in the Media24 stable.

Basson became editor-in-chief of News24 on 1 April 2016. He was also deputy chairperson of the South African National Editors' Forum between 2020 and 2022.

== Notable investigations and awards ==
In 2006, at Beeld, Basson began investigating corruption at the Department of Correctional Services. He and Carien du Plessis received the 2006 Taco Kuiper Award for Investigative Journalism for their exposés of the relationship between prisons commissioner Linda Mti and contractor Bosasa. Basson continued to investigate Bosasa contracts in later years, leading to a defamation suit in which he successfully asserted source protection privileges. He later appeared before the Zondo Commission to testify about his investigation.

While at the Mail & Guardian, Basson, Sole, and Brümmer received the 2008 Taco Kuiper Award for their reporting on Arms Deal corruption.

At City Press, Basson and Piet Rampedi led a prolonged investigation into the commercial interests of rising youth politician Julius Malema, which was recognised with the general print news award at the 2012 CNN African Journalist Awards.

The following year, Basson and Paddy Harper won the Sikuvile Journalist of the Year Award for their reporting on the Nkandla scandal.

== Books ==
Basson's books include Finish & Klaar: Selebi’s Fall from Interpol to the Underworld (2010), Blessed by Bosasa (2023), and, with Qaanitah Hunter, Who Will Rule South Africa? (2023). He has also written two books about Jacob Zuma's presidency: Zuma Exposed (2012) and, with Pieter du Toit, Enemy of the People (2017).

== Personal life ==
He is married to radio producer Cecile Basson. They have two children.
