= The Montreal Star =

Canadian newspaper

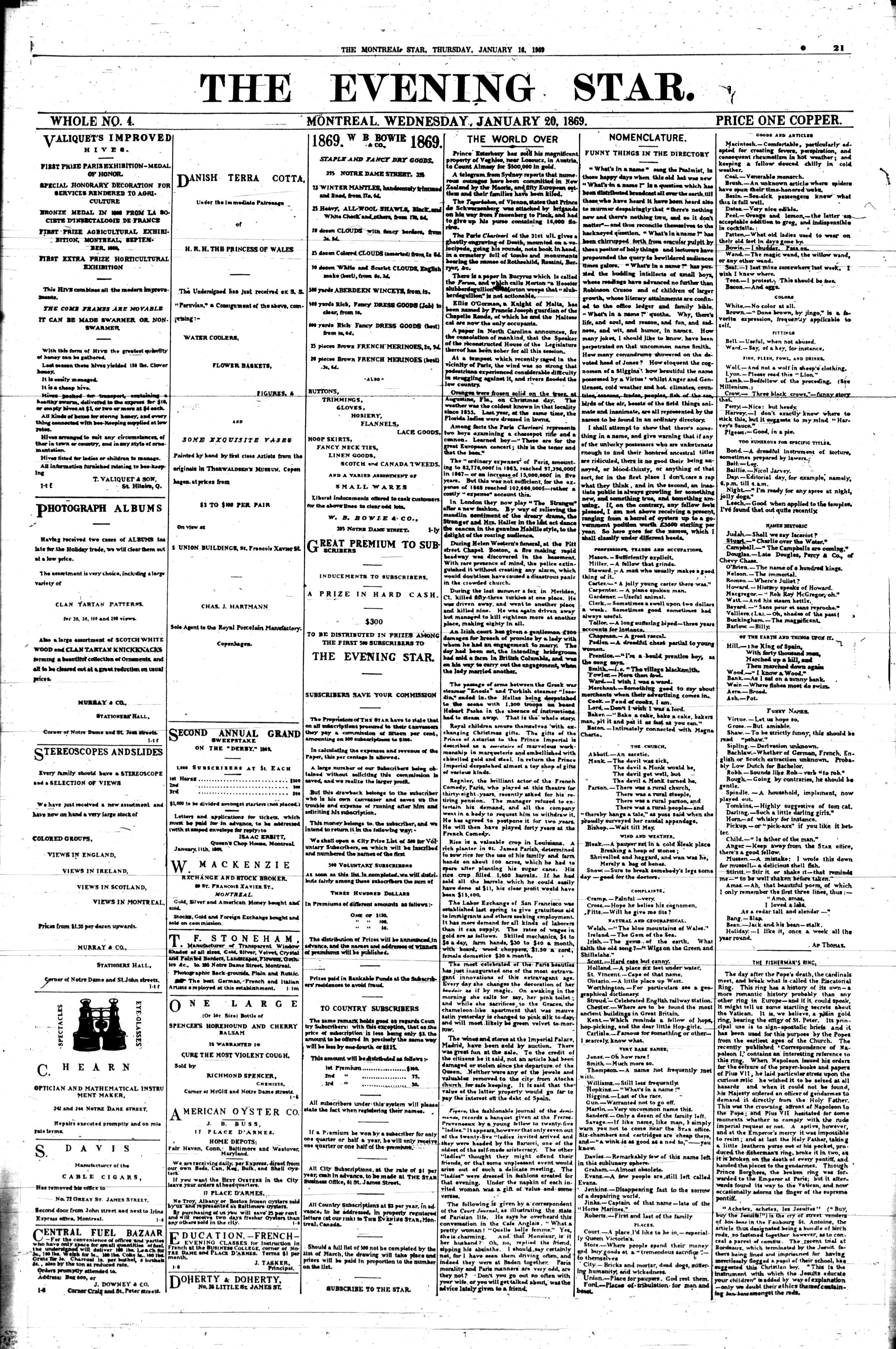
- A copy of The Montreal Evening Star from 1869
- Type: Daily newspaper
- Format: Broadsheet
- Owner(s): 1869–1925, Hugh Graham and George T. Lanigan; 1925–1963, John Wilson McConnell; 1963–1979, Free Press Publications
- Founded: January 16, 1869
- Ceased publication: September 25, 1979
- Political alignment: Canadian federalism
- Language: English language
- Headquarters: Montreal, Quebec, Canada
- ISSN: 0842-1331
- OCLC number: 6678225

The Montreal Star was an English-language Canadian newspaper published in Montreal, Quebec, Canada. It closed in 1979 in the wake of an eight-month pressmen's strike.

It was Canada's largest newspaper until the 1950s and remained the dominant English-language newspaper in Montreal until shortly before its closure.

== History ==
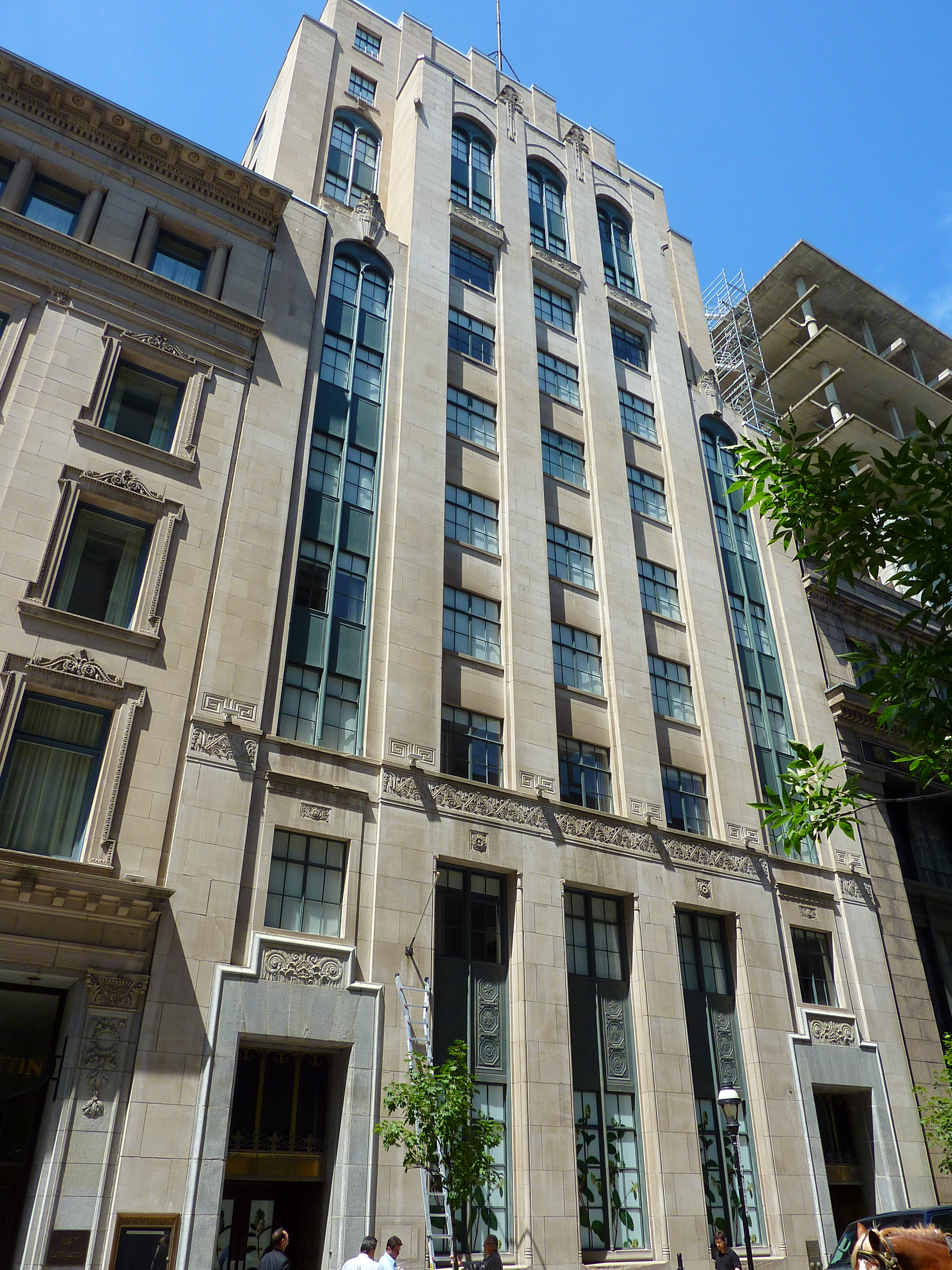
The former Montreal Star Building on Saint Jacques Street in Old Montreal

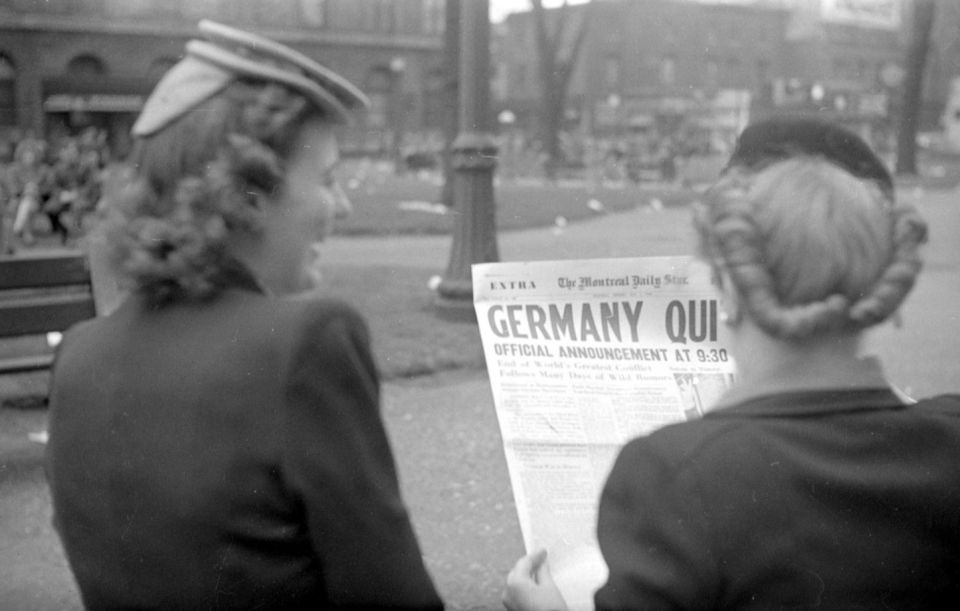
The front page of The Montreal Daily Star announcing the German surrender in 1945

The paper was founded January 16, 1869, by Hugh Graham, 1st Baron Atholstan, and George T. Lanigan as the Montreal Evening Star. Graham ran the newspaper for nearly 70 years. In 1877, The Evening Star became known as The Montreal Daily Star.

As well as news and editorials, the Star sometimes created its own topics of interest; in the late 1890s it sponsored a world tour for journalist Sarah Jeannette Duncan, and printed a series of features about her adventures.

In the 1890s the Star began voluntary audits of its circulation figures, and called for government regulation to control inflated circulation claims by other publications. The paper's circulation increased significantly during that decade, and by 1899, it reached a daily readership of 52,600; by 1913 40% of its circulation was outside of Montreal.

By 1915, the Montreal Star dominated the city's English-language evening newspaper market and Graham was able to out-perform his competitors who closed and assured him control of the English-language market.

In 1925, Graham sold the Montreal Star to John Wilson McConnell, but continued to operate the newspaper until his death in 1938. McConnell also owned two other publications, the Montreal Standard and the weekly Family Herald: Canada's National Farm Magazine.

Beginning in the 1940s, the Montreal Star became very successful, with a circulation of nearly 180,000 and remaining at roughly that same level for approximately thirty years.

In 1951, the Montreal Star launched its Weekend Magazine supplement (subsuming the former Montreal Standard), with an initial circulation of 900,000.

After McConnell's death in 1963, Toronto-based FP newspaper group, owner of The Globe and Mail and the Winnipeg Free Press acquired the Montreal Star. Thomson Newspapers later acquired the FP chain in 1980. In 1971, most of the shares in the newspaper were owned by Commercial Trust.

In 1978, a strike by pressmen (printers' union) began and lasted eight months. Although the strike was settled in February 1979 and the Star resumed publication, it had lost readers and advertisers to the rival paper The Gazette, and ceased publication permanently only a few months later on September 25, 1979. The Gazette acquired the Star's building, presses, and archives, and became the sole English-language daily in Montreal. Prior to the strike the Star had consistently out-sold The Gazette.

The newspaper ceased publication only a few months after another Montreal daily, Montréal-Matin, stopped its presses. These closings left many Montrealers concerned.

In the late 1970s, the Star launched its own non-fiction book publishing brand. After the publication of the paper was ended post-strike, the book division continued to operate independently. In 1982, it was taken private, and subsequently renamed Optimum Publishing International.

The death of the Star, soon followed by the simultaneous closing of the Winnipeg Tribune and Ottawa Journal pushed the federal government to establish the Kent Commission to examine newspaper monopolies in Canada.

== Notable contributors ==
The Montreal Star was the first newspaper in Canada to employ a staff editorial cartoonist, when it hired Henri Julien in 1888.

For Olympic gold medallist Myrtle McGowan wrote 40 years for the Montreal Star including a column about women's sport, retired from journalism in 1970.

Eddie MacCabe wrote for the Star in 1951 and 1952, prior to being inducted in the reporters section of the Canadian Football Hall of Fame.

Raymond Heard was the newspaper's White House correspondent from 1963 until 1973, and then served as the newspaper's managing editor, from 1976 until it closed in 1979. He served under Frank Walker who was editor-in-chief.

Other contributors of note included Kathleen Shackleton in the beginning of the 20th century, Red Fisher, Doris Giller, Nick Auf der Maur, Don Macpherson, Terry Mosher and Dennis Trudeau, many of whom moved over to The Gazette when the Star folded.

== See also ==
- List of newspapers in Canada
- List of Quebec media
- Raymond Heard
- Montreal Star Building

Montreal newspapers:

- The Gazette
- La Presse
- Le Journal de Montréal
- Le Devoir
- Montreal Daily News (defunct)
