= The Star (South Africa) =

South African daily newspaper

- Type: Daily newspaper
- Format: Broadsheet
- Owner: Independent News and Media SA
- Publisher: Sekunjalo Independent Media
- Editor: Japhet Mathanda Ncube
- Founded: 6 January 1887; 139 years ago
- Headquarters: 47 Pixley Seme Street, Johannesburg
- Website: www.iol.co.za/the-star/

The Star is a daily newspaper based in Gauteng, South Africa, that was established in 1887. The paper is distributed mainly in Gauteng and other provinces such as Mpumalanga, Limpopo, North West, and Free State.

The Star is one of the titles of the South African Independent News & Media group (INL), owned by Sekunjalo Media Consortium whose founder and chairman is Iqbal Survé. For many years, The Star was owned by the Argus Printing & Publishing Company, controlled by the Anglo American Corporation. The Irish Independent News & Media (INM) bought and renamed the Argus in the early 1990s. Sekujalo acquired INL in 2013.

== Content ==
The content published in The Star focuses on leading daily national, local and international national news and analysis. Its leader and opinion page offers a platform for thought leaders to contribute their opinions on topical news.

== Products ==
The Star houses the Business Report newspaper (a financial newspaper in South Africa), as well as a carrier for the following supplements:

- Tonight
- Talent 360
- Drive 360
- Classifieds

== Awards ==
Newspaper Journalism Awards 2012

- Hard News: Angelique Serrao "Gauteng toll roads"
- Feature photographs: Antoine de Ras "The Long Road Home"
- Hard News: Louise Flanagan "92 million: Zuma's political elite benefit"
- Enterprise News: Lebogang Seale "Raped by the justice system"
- Feature Writing: Beauregard Tromp "The weight of water" Jonathan Ancer "Adventures of an AWOL Chequebook" shared with our sister paper Cape Times
- News photographs: Antoine de Ras "Mogadishu Madness"
- Feature photographs: Antoine de Ras "The Long Road Home""
- Sports photographs: Adrian de Kock "Polo Pigeons" Standard Bank 2013 Sikuvile Journalism Awards
- Rising Star of the Year: Kristen van Schie Vast Number of Entries Standard Bank 2014 Sikuvile Journalism Awards
- Hard News: Angelique Serrao, Botho Molosankwe, Kristen Van Schie, Lebogang Seale & Kevin Ritchie Deadly Valentine (Series).
- Enterprise News: Kristen van Schie After the Fall.
- Popular Journalism: Omphitlhetse Mooki Hell Hath no Fury like a Woman Scorned.
- Newspaper Journalist of the Year: Antoine de Ras Oscar Pistorius Standard Bank 2015 Sikuvile Journalism Awards
- Hard News: Botho Molosankwe, Timothy Bernard, Theresa Taylor & Omphitlhetse Mooki "Joburg's Raging Fires - Firefight Scandal"
- Hard News: Botho Molosankwe "What a Bummer"
- Graphic Journalism: Sithembile Mtolo "Greening your home"
- News Photographs: Bongiwe Mchunu "Extinguisher" Standard Bank 2016 Sikuvile Journalism Awards
- Enterprise News: The Star Women's Team 2016 "The Rise of Women's Power"
- Graphic Journalism: Lebohang Elvin Nethononda "Soweto Uprising 1976"
- Presentation: Narianan Nelandri "16 June: 40 Years On"
- Young Journalist of the Year: Nokuthula Mbatha "Deep in the Devil's Drug" National Arts Festival/BASA Arts Journalism Awards 2016
- News: Silver Winners Wendyl Martin shared with its sister publication Weekend Argus

== Notable stories ==
=== The Bang-Bang Club ===
The Star newspaper employed three members of the Bang-Bang Club. It employed Kevin Carter as a staff photographer in 1984. Ken Oosterbroek worked for the paper before being appointed its chief photographer in August 1991. João Silva was hired shortly afterwards.

== History ==
The Star newspaper appeared for the first time in Johannesburg as The Eastern Star. It was founded in Grahamstown under that title on 6 January 1871 (as a resurrection of the previous Great Eastern paper), and was moved to the Witwatersrand sixteen years later by its owners, brothers Thomas and George Sheffield. In 1889, the name Eastern Star was changed to the one currently in use.

== Supplements ==
- Business Report (Monday-Friday)
- Tonight (Monday-Friday)
- Workplace (Monday & Wednesday)
- Motoring (Thursday)
- Play (monthly)

== Distribution areas ==
Distribution
	2008	2013
Eastern Cape	Y	
Free State	Y	Y
Gauteng	Y	Y
Kwa-Zulu Natal	Y	
Limpopo	Y	Y
Mpumalanga	Y	Y
North West	Y	Y
Northern Cape	Y	Y
Western Cape	Y	

== Distribution figures ==
Circulation
	Paid circulation	Total circulation
Apr - June 2026	3 446	18 355
Oct - Nov 2025	3 737	18 259
Jan - Mar 2025	4 423	19 730
Oct - Dec 2024	4 196	20 375
Jul - Sep 2024	4 355	20 230
Apr - Jun 2024	4 647	20 124
Jan - Mar 2024	5 146	18 432
Oct - Dec 2023	8 900	17 834
Jul - Sep 2023	9 137	18 229
Apr - Jun 2023	11 716	24 078
Jan - Mar 2023	12 436	25 596
Jul - Sep 2022	14 139	27 563
Jan - Mar 2022	15 279	27 984
Oct - Dec 2021	14 705	27 417
Jul - Sep 2021	13 967	25 769
Apr - Jun 2021	14 931	27 823
Jan - Mar 2020	33 128	57 019
Jan - Mar 2019		72 010
Jan - Mar 2018		75 836
Jan - Mar 2017		84 857
Jan - Mar 2016		86 833
Jan - Mar 2015		91 735
Jan - Mar 2014		101 711
Oct - Dec 2012		102 244
Jul - Sep 2012		105 686
Apr - Jun 2012		117 874
Jan - Mar 2012		124 641

== Readership figures ==
Estimated Readership
	AIR
January – December 2012	615 000
July 2011 - June 2012	683 000

== See also ==
- List of newspapers in South Africa
