= Iqbal Survé =

South African businessman (born 1963)

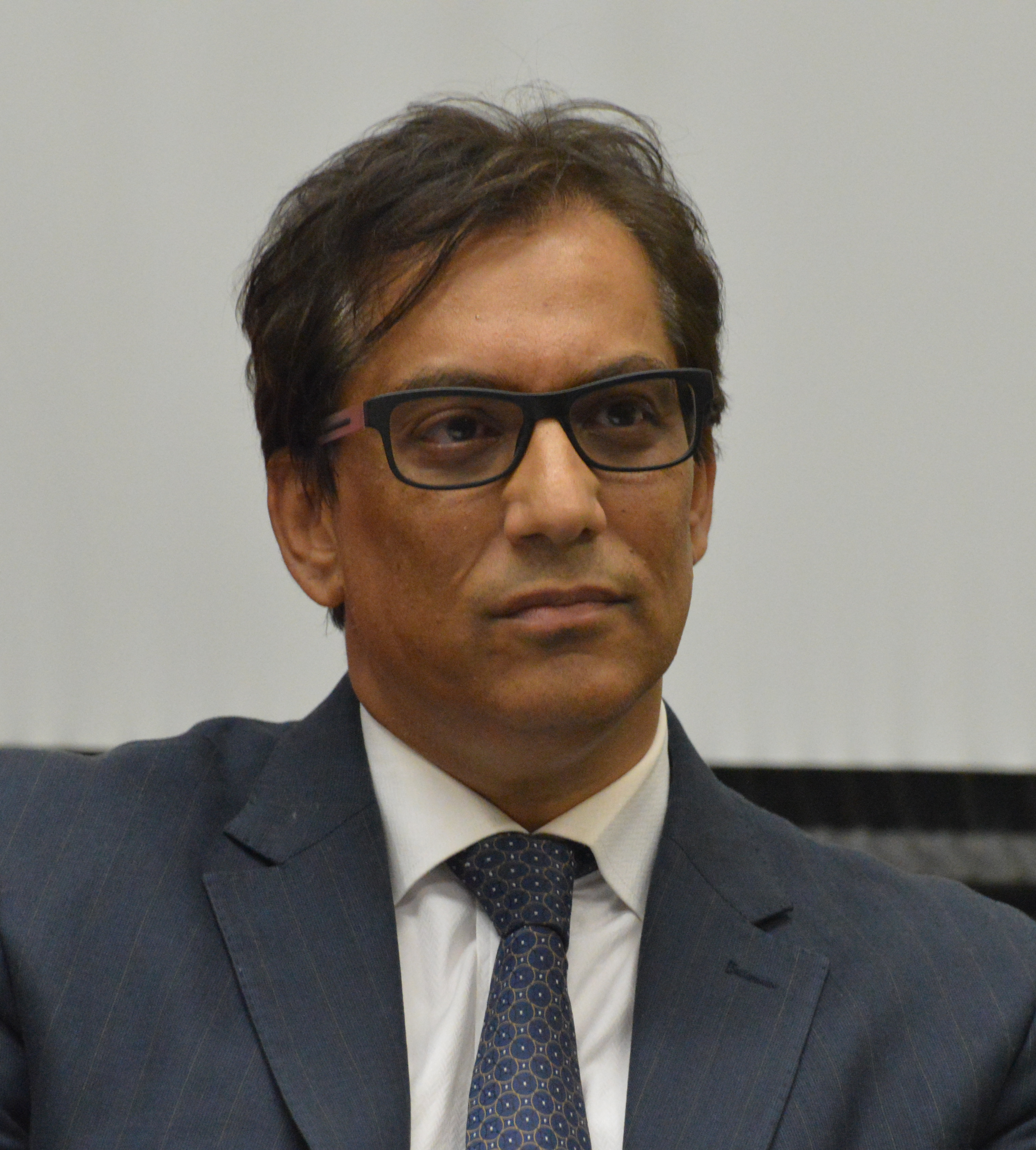
- Survé in 2015
- Born: February 12, 1963 (age 63); Cape Town, South Africa
- Occupations: Chairman, Sekunjalo Investments
- Years active: 1996-
- Website: iqbalsurve.com

Iqbal Survé (born 1963) is a South African businessman who is the chairman of Sekunjalo Investment Holdings, a diversified investment firm based in Cape Town, and the chairman of Independent Media, which publishes a number of newspapers as well as the Independent Online news website. Survé and his companies have come under investigation for alleged state capture and corrupt dealings with the government-controlled Public Investment Corporation.

== Early life ==
Survé was born on 12 February 1963 in Cape Town, South Africa. His family left the Cape Town suburb of Kenilworth where he grew up as the formerly racially mixed suburb became increasingly white under the apartheid government's Group Areas Act, making it harder for his family to live there or operate their family-owned café. Survé attended Livingstone High School, then classified by the apartheid government as a Coloured public school.

== Sekunjalo Investments and Independent Media ==
Survé left medicine in 1997 to found Sekunjalo Investments, with the aim of investing and assisting Black-owned businesses, and in 1999 listed it on the Johannesburg Stock Exchange. In 2013, Sekunjalo purchased a 55% stake in Independent News & Media SA, South Africa's second biggest newspaper group, from its international parent company, Independent News & Media. The purchase was largely funded by a loan from the government-owned Public Investment Corporation which manages the Government Employees Pension Fund. In an interview with journalist Mandy de Waal in the Daily Maverick, Survé rejected claims that the purchase was politically motivated, insisting that editorial independence would be protected through an advisory board, and argued that the deal was both commercially viable and part of a broader effort to expand black media ownership.

Journalists from both Independent Media and rival media companies have accused Survé of using his Independent Media publications to promote his own profile, editorial interference, targetting white staff, and dismissing staff who did not comply. The Press Council found that the Sunday Independent "allowed corporate interests to influence its editorial decision to publish" a column attacking journalists who had criticised Survé, creating a conflict of interest in breach of the Press Code. Survé's Independent Media was expelled from the Press Council after refusing to accept the ruling.

Under Survé's leadership, Independent Media supported Jacob Zuma, publishing articles in favour of Zuma and critical of rival presidential candidate Cyril Ramaphosa prior to the ANC's 2017 party conference. In 2022, News24 reported that Viasen Soobramoney, at the time the internal ombud for Independent Media, had implemented an editorial policy called 'Operation Hlanza' (meaning "cleanse") aiming at unseating Ramaphosa from his leadership of the African National Congress.

By 2018 a large proportion of the Public Investment Corporation's investment in Sekunjalo was reportedly written off while Sekunjalo claimed that they had reached an amicable agreement with the PIC for a debt-for-shares swop. The PIC has since applied to liquidate Sekunjalo Independent Media. Survé was accused of using pensioners' money to fund his companies, his lifestyle and his property portfolio. The Sunday Times reported that a company owned by Survé and his sisters, Aziza and Fatima, purchased seven apartments in the V&A Waterfront's No 3 Silo between October 2017 and August 2018. A former CEO of a Sekunjalo company claimed under oath that Survé attempted to bribe him with a Waterfront apartment in exchange for covering up financial irregularities related to the valuation of a listed company, AYO Technology Solutions. The company was said to have a reasonable valuation of R700 million, while Survé made an arrangement with the Public Investment Corporation to purchase a 29% stake in the company for R4.3 billion.

Several banks, including Absa, FNB, Nedbank, Investec, Standard Bank and Mercantile Bank refuse to do business with any company tied to Survé and his Sekunjalo Investment Holdings. 28 more banks and representative offices of foreign banks are boycotting Survé and his companies. The biggest South African banks cited the Mpati Commission findings of the "malfeasance" of Survé's group.

== International activities ==
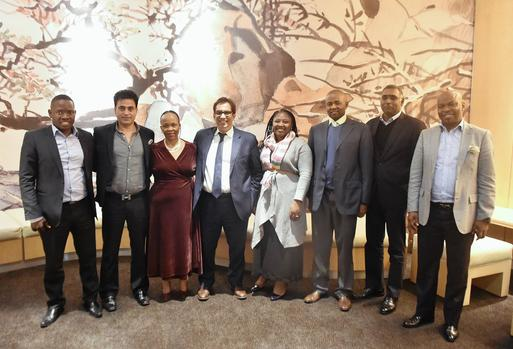
Dr Iqbal Survé (fourth from left) with members of the BRICS Business Council in Sandton, in June 2018.

Survé was chairman of the World Economic Forum's Global Growth Companies (GGC) advisory board and as vice-chairman of the Global Agenda Council on Emerging Multinationals.

Survé was appointed chairperson of the BRICS Business Council in 2017. Survé was also appointed co-chair of the BRICS Media Forum, a body formed to coordinate and cooperate in telling stories of developing nations via media organisations of BRICS countries. In June 2023, Survé was honoured with Russian Foreign Ministry's medal for cooperation, presented to him by Sergey Lavrov in Cape Town. Lavrov recognised Survé for his contribution to BRICS.

== Philanthropy ==
In 2013, Survé travelled to the United Arab Emirates where he successfully negotiated for a retired South African paediatrician, Cyril Karabus, to be released from custody after Karabus was controversially imprisoned there. Karabus' family had appealed to Survé for assistance and he was able to make use of a personal friendship with the UAE royal family to negotiate the release.

Survé's Sekunjalo Development Foundation donated ZAR 4.5 million to a European Union lobbying organisation called Fight Impunity in 2020, and was claimed to be the "most important donor" to the organisation. Fight Impunity has been embroiled in the Qatargate scandal. Survé acknowledged making the donation but denied any wrongdoing on his part.

In July 2021, Survé pledged a donation of one million rands to the parents of the supposed "Tembisa 10" decuplets. Survé's Pretoria News and IOL published a series of articles about the birth with multiple requests for donations. Survé flew in the supposed father of the babies as well as the Pretoria News editor Piet Rampedi who wrote the story from Gauteng to Cape Town for a press briefing to journalists from Survé's media entities at the Sekunjalo head office at the V&A Waterfront. The story was found to be false by the BBC as well as Independent Media's own ombud and the Public Protector; Survé maintained that the babies did exist and had been trafficked, but did not provide evidence.

Following the 2023 earthquake in Turkey, Survé Philanthropies donated R15 million worth of aid in the form of tents, clothing, blankets, gas heaters and other items. The aid was handed over to the Turkish Consul General in Cape Town, Sinan Yeşildağ on 14 April 2023.

Survé has been criticised for claiming that he donates most of his money while Independent Media staff were not paid their full salaries.

== Controversies ==
=== Claims of a relationship with Nelson Mandela and Ahmed Kathrada ===
Survé claims a close relationship with Nelson Mandela, and in 2014, a Leadership Platform article in Business Report (a paper owned by Survé's Sekunjalo group) stated that Survé had been Mandela's doctor "on and off Robben Island". These claims have been disputed on various grounds. Mandela's personal assistant of 18 years, Zelda la Grange, said she had no knowledge of any relationship between Survé and Mandela.

Survé also claimed to be mentored by Mandela's fellow prisoner and anti-apartheid stalwart Ahmed Kathrada. Kathrada confirmed in 2017 that he had accompanied Survé and his family to Robben Island a few years prior, but denied having been a mentor and stated that he "did not know the man [Survé] personally".

=== Divorce settlement ===
In August 2016, African News Agency (ANA), a Sekunjalo subsidiary for which Survé was executive chairman made a payment of ZAR 25 million to Survé's personal bank account. In response to a query from Nedbank, Aziza Amod, Survé's sister and a Sekunjalo executive who was on various boards of Sekunjalo subsidiary companies, referred to the payment as a "spouse settlement". Nedbank was concerned as to why ANA had settled Survé's divorce settlement, to which Survé responded that his sister misstated the reason for the transaction and that ANA did not settle "any divorce settlement". Instead he claimed that the payment was an inter-company loan between ANA and Sekunjalo Investment Holdings. Court documents indicated that Nedbank was not satisfied with the response as the payment was paid to Survé's personal account and not that of Sekunjalo Investment Holdings.

=== Payments to politicians ===
Survé has come under fire for making payments to a number of politicians and politically exposed persons. An amount of R 30 000 was paid to controversial former ANC spokesperson Carl Niehaus, which according to Survé's sister was a loan due to financial distress experienced by Niehaus.

In 2018, Survé's asset management company, 3 Laws Capital, paid R 200 000 to former cabinet minister Tina Joemat-Pettersson. Joemat-Pettersson claimed that the payment was a loan which she had repaid. Joemat-Pettersson was previously linked to Survé, having irregularly awarded an R 800 million marine services tender to Sekunjalo, which resulted in her fall from grace.

The payment to Joemat-Pettersson came a few months after Sekunjalo subsidiary AYO Technology Solutions received a R 4.3 billion cash investment from the state-controlled Public Investment Corporation of which R 870 million was advanced to 3 Laws Capital. Joemat-Pettersson died on 5 June 2023 and an inquest into the circumstances of her death was opened by the South African Police Services following allegations of attempted bribery.
