= Pretoria News =

South African newspaper

- Type: Weekly newspaper
- Format: Broadsheet
- Owner: Independent News and Media SA
- News editor: Piet Rampedi
- Founded: 1898
- Language: English
- Headquarters: 216 Madiba Street, Pretoria, South Africa
- Website: www.iol.co.za/pretoria-news

Pretoria News is a daily English-medium newspaper established in 1898 in South Africa's capital city Pretoria. It is distributed in the Tshwane Metropolitan area. Pretoria News covers a range of local news, as well as national and international news, comment and analysis by experts, sport, entertainment and lifestyle. It publishes a daily edition from Monday to Friday and also offers a weekend edition. Pretoria News is part of the Independent Media South Africa group and is available online via the Independent Online (South Africa) website.

== History ==
The Pretoria News was first published in Pretoria on 13 June 1898 by Leo Weinthal as an afternoon paper. Roderick Jones edited it up until the beginning of the Second Boer War, ceasing publication on 30 September 1899. It resumed publication on 8 December 1902, now owned by A.E. Reno's Pretoria Printing Works, with capital provided by the Transvaal Colonial government under Lord Milner. Sir Ernest Chappell was its major shareholder when he sold his share to the Argus Group in 1929. The rest of shares were owned by South African Associated Newspapers. On 7 September 1972, it was renamed the Pretoria News.

=== Editors ===
- A.E. Reno (1902 - 1910)
- Vere P. Stent (1910 - 1920)
- W.S. Rayner (1920 - 1924)
- J.A. Gray (1924 - 1932)
- Rex V. Hall (1932 - 1941)
- J.S.M. Simpson (1941 - 1950)
- E.H. Howse (1950- 1955)
- D.D. Sargent (1955 - 1958)
- J.W. Patten (1959 - 1962)
- R.A. Gill (1962 - 1970)
- Tertius Myburgh (1971 - 1975)

== Digital presence ==
Pretoria News has a number of daily supplements that cater to a variety of readers. These supplements are then placed on IOL online to reach digital audiences. The content is targeted at those who live and work in Pretoria and Tshwane.

== Products ==
Pretoria News houses the Business Report newspaper (a widely read financial newspaper in South Africa), as well as a carrier for the following supplements:

- Auctions
- Business Report
- Talent 360
- Drive 360
- Good Life
- Home

The mood shifts on Saturday, and Pretoria News Weekend offers a more leisurely read. It consists of a compelling mix of news and background features, previews and major sporting action at the weekend, top horse racing tips from an award-winning tipster, as well as a review of the week in brief.

== Awards ==
- 2010 National Press Club – North-West University Journalist of the Year competition – Graeme Hosken
- 2012 SA Sports Awards – Excellence in Sports Journalism – Pretoria News rugby writer Vata Ngobeni
- 2013 – Society Upliftment Award through Newsmaker of the Year ceremony.
- 2018 – Standard Bank Sikuvile Journalism Awards – Bongani Shilubane

== Supplements ==
- Business Report (Monday-Friday)
- Tonight (Monday-Friday)
- Workplace (Monday & Wednesday)
- Motoring (Thursday)
- Play (Once a month)

== Distribution areas ==
Distribution
	2008	2013
Eastern Cape		
Free State		
Gauteng	Y	Y
Kwa-Zulu Natal		
Limpopo	Y	
Mpumalanga	Y	Y
North West	Y	
Northern Cape		
Western Cape		

== Distribution figures ==
Circulation
	Net Sales
Jan – Mar 2015	31 687
Jan – Mar 2014	25 762
Oct – Dec 2012	17 576
Jul – Sep 2012	19 235
Apr – Jun 2012	20 316
Jan – Mar 2012	21 406

== Readership figures ==
Estimated Readership
	AIR
January – December 2012	141 000
July 2011 – June 2012	147 000

== See also ==
- List of newspapers in South Africa
