= Public Investment Corporation =

South African state-owned asset management firm

Public Investment Corporation of South Africa
- Type: State-owned entity
- Industry: Asset management Financial services
- Founded: 1911; 115 years ago
- Headquarters: Pretoria, Gauteng, South Africa
- Area served: South Africa
- Key people: Abel Sithole (CEO); Batandwa Damoyi (CFO); Dr David Masondo (Chairman)
- Services: Investment management
- Revenue: ▲ R1.60 billion (2025)
- Net income: ▲ R511 million (2025)
- AUM: ▲ R3.04 trillion (2025)
- Total assets: ▲ R4.91 billion (2025)
- Total equity: ▲ R4.39 billion (2025)
- Owner: Government of South Africa
- Number of employees: 443 (2025)
- Website: pic.gov.za

The Public Investment Corporation (PIC) is a South African state-owned asset management firm, with a total of R3.04 trillion in assets under management (AUM) as of 2025. Headquartered in Pretoria, Gauteng, the company is Africa's largest asset manager.

Established in 1911, it holds large stakes in several South African companies, and is one of the entities through which the government implements its policy of Broad-Based Black Economic Empowerment. The PIC is also responsible for investing in the South African Government Employees Pension Fund (GEPF).

== History ==
The organisation has its origins in 1911, with the passing of the Public Debt Commissioners Act of 1911, a year after the formation of the Union of South Africa. Known then as the Public Debt Commissioners, it would manage the government's debt, investing the government and South African Railways and Harbours trust funds and by 1924 had taken on the provincial administrators funds as well.

By the mid-1920s it would manage the granting of loans to local governments in the country. The Pension funds managed by the government would allow the government to borrow against those funds. In 1984, a new act, the Public Investment Commissioners Act No.45 of 1984, moved its focus from debt to investment management, investing funds on behalf of government organisations, the appointment of commissioners and the finance minister as its chairman.

With the first free election in South Africa in 1994, the Public Investment Commissioners announced the formation of the Isibaya Fund in 1995. This saw a portion of the money managed diverted to the new fund to invest in Socially Responsible Investments to target economic growth transformations in population groups disadvantaged during apartheid.

The next change came in 2004 with a new act passed called the Public Investment Corporation Act of 2004, where the Public Investment Commission became legalised corporate asset managers. Now a client's specific investment objectives would be expresses in a detailed client investment mandate which are individually negotiated with a client concerned and approved by the Financial Services Board.

In 2016, PIC bought a 26.4% stake in South-African beverage company Distell from AB InBev. The stake was valued at $645 million. In 2020, PIC raised their stake in retailer Mr Price to 15.08%.

In March 2020 an inquiry was made into PIC which reported staff victimisation, bad company governance and impropriety, while former CEO Dan Matjila was accused of misusing funds and making poor investment decisions. In 2023 the PIC annual report's lack of transparency regarding the cost of legal proceeding and investigation of the inquiry was criticised.

In 2022, the PIC made a $100 million equity investment in the Africa Finance Corporation.

In November 2022, PIC, along with Aberdeen Asset Management, sold the remaining controlling shares of major South African retail firm Massmart to Bentonville, Arkansas-based retailer Walmart in an all-cash transaction valued at $377.6 million.

PIC increased its stake in Clicks Group to 20.135% in March 2025 by purchasing shares valued at $14.89 million. Later that month, PIC raised its stake in Woolworth to 20.248%, becoming the largest shareholder in the company. In the same year, PIC invested $40 million into Africa50, an African infrastructure investor.

== Governance ==
The current PIC Chairman is also the South African Deputy Minister of Finance, and was appointed by the Minister of Finance. The chairman is a government member mainly due to the high percentage of government pension funds under management by the Public Investment Corporation. All other directors are also appointed by Minister of Finance.

== Share of total assets under management ==
As of March 2025, the share of the PIC's total assets under management attributable to each of its major clients is as follows:

- Government Employees Pension Fund (GEPF) – 87.80%
- Unemployment Insurance Fund (UIF) – 5.58%
- Compensation Commissioner Fund (CC) – 2.32%
- Compensation Commissioner Pension Fund (CP) – 2.04%
- Associated Institutions Pension Fund (AIPF) – 0.68%
- Other clients with smaller portfolios – 1.59%

== Funds held under management ==
The total assets held under management by the Public Investment Corporation are in the table below.

Year	Total funds (trillions)	% Change	Ref
2003	▲ R0.309	N/A	
2004	▲ R0.377	22.01%	
2005	▲ R0.461	22.28%	
2006	▲ R0.599	29.93%	
2007	▲ R0.720	20.20%	
2008	▲ R0.787	9.31%	
2009	▼ R0.740	-5.97%	
2010	▲ R0.911	23.11%	
2011	▲ R1.032	13.28%	
2012	▲ R1.170	13.37%	
2013	▲ R1.400	19.66%	
2014	▲ R1.600	14.29%	
2015	▲ R1.810	13.13%	
2016	▲ R1.857	2.60%	
2017	▲ R1.928	3.82%	
2018	▲ R2.083	8.04%	
2019	▲ R2.164	3.89%	
2020	▼ R1.907	-11.88%	
2021	▲ R2.339	22.65%	
2022	▲ R2.548	8.2%	
2023	▲ R2.599	2.0%	
2024	▲ R2.691	3.6%	
2025	▲ R3.049	13.30%	
2026	▲ R3.657	20.0%	

== Investments ==
As a long-term investor, the Public Investment Corporation sets its objective as one to achieve returns higher than the clients have benchmarked and is spread amongst four investments areas:

- Fixed income and dealing – Manages all fixed bonds in which the Public Investment Corporation has invested. A government corporation or parastatal would approach the Public Investment Corporation to borrow funds and in exchange a fixed interest bearing bond would be issued and managed on behalf of the former organisations. They are a member of the Bond Exchange of South Africa (BESA).
- Listed equities – Their largest client is the Government Employees Pension Fund (GEPF) with approximately 80% of the stocks managed internally and external managers managing the remaining 20% of the fund with the ability to invest up to 10% of the funds outside of South Africa. Its investment on the Johannesburg Stock Exchange is worth approximately 12.5% of the exchanges capitalisation.
- Properties – Manages high-quality retail, offices and industrial properties including property asset management, property development and new property acquisitions. The clients of the property fund are the Government Employees Pension Fund (GEPF), the Unemployment Insurance Fund (UIF) and the Compensation Commissioner Fund (CC). Some of the properties managed or part managed are the Menlyn Shopping Centre, Cresta Shopping Centre, The Pavilion, Tyger Valley Centre, Westgate and Southgate shopping centres as well as the Minosa and Victoria & Alfred Waterfront and the Airports Company South Africa, owner of national and international airports.
- Isibaya – making use of a portion of clients funds, it provides financing for projects that contribute to long-term economic, social, and environmental outcomes in South Africa but provide a financial returns for the client.

== See also ==
- List of countries by sovereign wealth funds
- Sovereign wealth fund
- Banking in South Africa
