= Cape Times =

Newspaper from Cape Town, South Africa

- The front page of the Cape Times of 19 September 2008
- Type: Daily newspaper
- Format: Broadsheet
- Owner: Independent News and Media SA
- Editor: Siyavuya Mzantsi
- News editor: Ashfak Mohamed
- Founded: 27 March 1876; 150 years ago
- Headquarters: Newspaper House, Cape Town, South Africa
- Circulation: 34,523
- Sister newspapers: Cape Argus
- Website: capetimes.co.za

The Cape Times is an English-language morning newspaper owned by Independent News & Media SA and published in Cape Town, South Africa.

As of 2012, the newspaper had a daily readership of 261,000 and a circulation of 34,523. By the fourth quarter of 2014, circulation had declined to 31,930.

== History ==
The Cape Times had its origins in the great economic and social boom years that followed the Cape's attainment of "Responsible Government" (local democracy) in 1872. The first edition of the newspaper, a small four-page sheet, was published on 27 March 1876 by then editor Frederick York St Leger. St Leger was assisted by Richard William Murray Jr, whose father of the same name had been one of the founding partners of the Cape Argus.

It was the first daily paper in southern Africa, and soon became one of the principal newspapers of the Cape. Modelled on The Times, its primary target was the poor working class, as it attempted to expose early government corruption.

From 1936 the paper, along with its printing operation, occupied Newspaper House on Greenmarket Square.

The Cape Times gained international prominence when it published an interview with the then banned leader of the African National Congress (ANC), Oliver Tambo in 1985. The interview, published in the Cape Times under the heading "A Conversation with Oliver Tambo of the ANC,” was an important event in South African history as it allowed the ANC to present its vision of a non-racial South Africa to the public and thereby alleviate fears held by White South Africans for a post-apartheid South Africa. This ultimately helped created the political conditions for the negotiated settlement that ended apartheid and established a non-racial democratic government.

The Cape Times editor that conducted the interview, Tony Heard, was later arrested and charged with contravening the Internal Security Act. The charges were later dropped.

The paper was later bought by Irish group Independent News and Media, the South African portion, including the Cape Times, was sold to Sekunjalo Investments (Independent News and Media SA) in 2013.

== Supplements ==
- Business Report (Mon-Fri)
- Career Times (Mon)
- Drive Times (Thur)
- Top Of The Times (Fri)
- Book Times (Once a month)
- Escape (Once a month)
- Health Times (Once a month)
- Play (Once a month)

== Controversies and criticisms ==
The editor of the newspaper, Tony Heard, was sacked in 1987 after refusing a R1 million (equivalent to R15,000,000 in 2018) offer to resign that contained conditions that, Heard alleged, would have muzzled him. The newspaper had decided to remove him following the publication of his interview with ANC leader, Oliver Tambo, almost two years prior, for which the paper was forced to pay a R300 admission-of-guilt fine for breaching the apartheid era Internal Security Act.

=== Sekunjalo ownership: 2013 onwards ===
Right2Know Campaign and other civil society organisations hold a picket outside Newspaper House to protest against the replacement of Cape Times editor Alide Dasnois. Also present at the demonstration are counter-demonstrators (waving printed red, white, and black placards with most members wearing t-shirts from Tripartite Alliance member organisations) demonstrating in favour of the replacement of Dasnois.

Since being taken over by Iqbal Survé's Sekunjalo Investments in 2013 the newspaper has experienced a number of scandals. Critics in the rest of the South African media, including former staff at the newspaper, allege that the newspaper's credibility has been damaged, the quality of journalism significantly reduced, and staff mistreated.

On 16 April 2013 the Cape Times was cautioned by the Press Ombudsman "for untruthfully, inaccurately and unfairly suggesting that a poll showed that the majority of [Israeli] Jews believed that the Jewish state was practicing apartheid." The poll related to a hypothetical situation, whether Palestinians living in the West Bank should be allowed to vote if Israel annexed the territory, rather than the way that Israel was actually being governed at the time. The newspaper was directed to correct its mistake after a complaint by Sidney Kay.

Then editor, Alide Dasnois, was dismissed by Survé following the publication of a story in the Cape Times that covered a report by the South African Public Protector that was critical of a tender awarded to a Sekunjalo subsidiary; the story was published on the same day as the death of former president Nelson Mandela on 5 December 2013. Sekunjalo was accused of dismissing Dasnois for publishing a story critical of a Survé owned company, Sekunjalo claimed that Dasnois was dismissed due to declining newspaper sales and for not putting Mandela's death on the front page of the Cape Times.

The dismissal of Dasnois was seen as an attack on the independence of the media and widely criticized. Sekunjalo and Dasnois settled out of court and issued a statement that acknowledged that Dasnois did not show disrespect to Mandela's legacy, nor was her conduct in any way motivated by racism.

By 2014 a large number of the newspaper's staff had leaf due concerns with management decisions and its impact on journalistic quality.

In January 2015 the company and its director Iqbal Survé were accused of pro-African National Congress (ANC) political bias in how they operated Independent News and Media SA and its subsidiary newspapers such as the Cape Times. The accusation of bias came about after executives at Independent News, the Cape Times partent company, Karima Brown and Vukani Mde, wore ANC colours at an ANC rally.

The accusations were first made by former Independent News columnist Max du Preez in his open resignation letter as reasons for his refusal to work for the company any longer. Opposition leader Helen Zille stated that Skunjalo's operation of Independent media was an example of state capture that threatens both the independence of the media and the development of democracy in South Africa.

The company was again criticised for its close links with the ANC and of allegedly having an anti-Democratic Alliance (DA) bias in a report on Al-Jazeera in March 2016. The DA for its part was accused of trying to silence criticism from the Cape Times by threatening to cancel the City of Cape Town's subscription to that publication. In the same report the Cape Times rejected any accusation that it or any Sekunjalo owned publication was reporting unfairly towards any opposition political party.

On 28 June 2016 The Press Ombudsman found "The Cape Times has repeatedly made this totally false allegation (stated as fact) on its front page over the course of several months, beginning in November last year." In July 2016 the Cape Times was again ordered to issue a front-page apology to Premier Helen Zille, after making false allegations that she hired a spy. Despite this, the newspaper has failed to comply with the previous order, as handed down by Judge Bernard Ngoepe, Chair of the Press Council's Appeals Panel.

16 August 2017, veteran journalist Ed Herbst debunked Cape Times claims of it receiving awards, "has run a series of front-page articles claiming that an international media organisation, Newseum, has rated the front page of the Iqbal Survé-owned newspaper as among the best in the world." The reports turned out to be untrue.

== Notable staff and contributors ==
- Roy Campbell
- Alide Dasnois (editor 2009-13)
- Tony Heard (editor 1971-1986)
- James Matthews
- Sol Plaatje
- William Plomer
- Allister Sparks (columnist)
- Barry Streek (political journalist 1976-2001)
- Laurens van der Post (reporter 1930s)
- Tony Weaver (Reporter, columnist, opinion editor)
- Desmond Young- reporter
- Anthony Holiday (anti-apartheid activist and philosopher) - reporter from 1965 until joining The Rand Daily Mail

== Distribution areas ==
Distribution
	2008	2013
Eastern Cape	Y	Y
Free State		
Gauteng		
Kwa-Zulu Natal		
Limpopo		
Mpumalanga		
North West		
Northern Cape		
Western Cape	Y	Y

== Distribution figures ==
Circulation
	Net Sales
Oct - Dec 2015	33 030
Jun - Aug 2015	31 200
Jan - Mar 2015	32 371
Oct - Dec 2014	31 930
Jan - Mar 2014	33 986
Oct - Dec 2012	34 627
Jul - Sep 2012	34 523
Apr - Jun 2012	37 948
Jan - Mar 2012	42 139

== Readership figures ==
Estimates of readership are maintained by the SAARF with 95% confidence intervals of about 15%. Within the estimated error readership has remained constant since 2009. Methodological changes introduced in 2009 by SAARF make comparison to previous years difficult.

Estimated Readership
	'000s	± '000 (95%)
Jan '09 - Dec '09	215	33
Jul '09 - Jun '10	253	36
Jan '10 - Dec '10	268	37
Jul '10 - Jun '11	231	35
Jan '11 - Dec '11	225	33
Jul '11 - Jun '12	261	36
Jan '12 - Dec '12	258	36
Jul '12 - Jun '13	251	38
Dec '13	215	35
Jun '14	200	33
Dec '14	235	36
Jun '15	234	36

== See also ==
- List of newspapers in South Africa

== External sources ==
- Shaw, Gerald (2000). The Cape Times: An Informal History. David Philip Publishers. ISBN 0864864043.
- Cape Times Collection, University of Cape Town Libraries
