= James Nkambule =

South African politician (1973 - 2010)

- Born: James Vusumuzi Nkambule; 1 January 1973; Barberton, Mpumalanga, South Africa
- Died: 7 October 2010 (aged 37); Barberton. Mpumalanga
- Cause of death: Poisoning
- Burial place: Barberton
- Occupation: Politician
- Political party: African National Congress (ANC) (1995 - 2006); Congress of the People (Cope) (2008 - 2010)
- Spouse: Claudia Xwabe
- Children: Buhle Nkambule Vusimuzi Nkambule Sinethemba Nkambule Alberthina Nkambule James jr Nkambule

James Vusumuzi Nkambule (1 January 1973 – 7 October 2010) was a South African politician who served as provincial secretary of the African National Congress Youth League (ANCYL) in Mpumalanga, elected at the league’s inaugural provincial conference in May 1998. Nkambule gained notoriety and became a media sensation for making wild claims and for his outspoken criticism of senior leaders of the African National Congress (ANC) and his involvement in factional battles within the party under president Thabo Mbeki. He first rose to prominence in 2001 when he alleged that three senior ANC figures - Mathews Phosa, Tokyo Sexwale, and Cyril Ramaphosa -were plotting to overthrow Mbeki. The claim was later dismissed by a police and intelligence services investigation.

In 2006, he was expelled from both the ANC and the ANCYL after an internal disciplinary hearing found him guilty of bringing the party into disrepute and violating its constitution. Two years later, in 2008, he joined the Congress of the People (Cope) and became its leader in Ehlanzeni region, a position he held until his death from suspected poisoning in 2010.

== Defection to COPE and the Mbombela stadium assassinations ==
Seen as aligned to Thabo Mbeki and anti-Jacob Zuma ahead of the watershed 2007 ANC elective conference, Nkambule's expulsion from the party was based on his ownership of The Truth, a Barberton-based newspaper that frequently published corruption allegations against ANC leaders, including then-Mpumalanga ANC deputy chairperson David Mabuza. Following his expulsion in 2006, Nkambule joined the newly formed Cope in 2008 and became its leader in Ehlanzeni Region. However, his involvement in political controversies continued.

In 2010, Nkambule made headlines again when he claimed that a series of assassinations in Mpumalanga were linked to corruption surrounding the R2-billion Mbombela stadium construction project for the 2010 FIFA World Cup. He alleged that prominent politicians had hired assassins to silence whistleblowers exposing irregularities in the tendering process, including Mbombela municipal speaker Jimmy Mohlala who was shot dead for exposing irregularities in the government project.

Nkambule was in the process of assisting a self-confessed Mozambican hitman, known as "Josh," to enter the witness protection program and testify about allegedly being used by politicians to assassinate opponents. Josh, who was later discovered to be non-existent, had reportedly been employed by a powerful provincial ANC man and a well-known soccer boss to eliminate political and business opponents, smuggle drugs, and poison individuals. His affidavit alleged that he was involved in the killing of Mohlala.

Josh’s affidavit also implicated several senior officials, including:

- Former Govan Mbeki Local Municipality Chief Financial Officer (CFO) Joshua Ntshuhle, who was killed in 2005 before he was scheduled to testify in a corruption trial involving the municipality's market manager Sibusiso Sigudla. Ntshuhle's car was allegedly driven to Malawi to create the illusion that he had fled.
- Former Gert Sibande District Municipality mayor Andries Gamede, Scopa chairperson Fish Mahlalela, and Mbombela mayor Lassy Chiwayo, who were allegedly targeted for assassination.
- Josh further claimed that four of his co-conspirators, who had carried out the hit on Mohlala, had since been executed to eliminate evidence.

The ANC dismissed the allegations and said "nobody in his right mind" should believe Nkambule because he was a proven liar.

== Poisoning and death ==
On 7 October 2010, Nkambule suddenly collapsed and died at his home in Mjindini, Barberton. Initially, police ruled out foul play, but a confidential autopsy conducted by Mpumalanga chief medical officer Dr. Gantcho Gantchev later concluded that he had been poisoned. The postmortem report noted "white foamy material" in Nkambule's throat and windpipe, as well as 30ml of brownish fluid in his stomach, "suggestive of ... poison ingestion." Nkambule’s wife, Claudia Xwabe, and daughter, Buhle Nkambule, insisted that he had been murdered. Police later confirmed they had opened an inquest into his death. This was not the first time Nkambule had claimed to have been poisoned. In 2006, he was hospitalized multiple times after allegedly ingesting poison at a Barberton event. According to Josh, he was personally ordered to poison Nkambule that year by a senior politician. In his affidavit, Josh detailed how he was handed a small bottle of liquid poison, which he poured into Nkambule's food while serving him at a matric dance function. Josh claimed he later confessed to Nkambule out of fear for his own life, as many of his fellow assassins had been eliminated. Nkambule submitted Josh’s affidavit to the police in early 2010. Instead of investigating the claims, the authorities arrested Nkambule, accusing him of fabricating evidence. He was out on R8,000 bail and was due to appear in court on charges of defeating the ends of justice and fraud at the time of his death.
