= Jimmy Mohlala =

South African politician and whistleblower (1965 - 2009)

- Born: Jimmy Mohlala; 1965; South Africa
- Died: 4 January 2009; Kanyamazane, Mbombela, Mpumalanga, South Africa
- Occupation: Politician
- Known for: Exposing corruption in construction of Mbombela Stadium
- Spouse: Bonny Mohlala

Speaker of Mbombela City Council
- In office 2006 – 4 January 2009

Jimmy Mohlala (1965 - 4 January 2009) was a South African politician, whistle-blower and Speaker of the Mbombela Local Municipality in Mpumalanga. He exposed alleged corruption in the awarding of tenders related to the construction of the Mbombela Stadium for the 2010 FIFA World Cup, and was assassinated in what many believe was a politically motivated killing to bury the construction tender fraud.

Mohlala was born in 1965 and served as Speaker of the Mbombela Municipality. A member of the African National Congress (ANC), he was also vice-president of the South African Football Association (SAFA).

In early 2008, Mohlala blew the whistle on alleged tender irregularities involving Mbombela municipal manager Jacob Dladla and the awarding of multimillion-rand construction contracts for the 2010 FIFA World Cup. The tenders were reportedly awarded using fraudulent tax clearance certificates.

According to the Mail & Guardian, Mohlala refused to step down after being recalled by the African National Congress (ANC) for exposing Dladla. He remained defiant even as the party was initiating disciplinary actions against him at the time of his death.

The Mail & Guardian reported that the local council had investigated Dladla for alleged tender manipulation, harassment of employees, and failure to keep the council informed about World Cup infrastructure progress. Some ANC officials allegedly tried to suppress the report.

== Assassination ==
Mohlala was assassinated outside his home in Kanyamazane on the Sunday evening of 4 January 2009. According to the spokesperson of the South African Police Service (SAPS), Captain Philip Fakude, Mohlala was shot in the shoulder while fleeing two armed men who had first argued with and shot his 19-year-old son in the ankle. Mohlala died en route to the hospital.

The MEC of Mpumalanga Department of Safety and Security, Siphosezwe Masango, expressed shock at the "senseless murder" of Mohlala and called on the police to act speedily in finding the suspects.

The ANC conveyed its heartfelt condolences to Mohlala’s family, describing him as a skilled and committed leader. Provincial secretary Lucky Ndinisa said Mohlala’s death was a painful loss, emphasizing his dedication to improving the lives of ordinary citizens and the significant gap his passing would leave in the organization.

Allegations later emerged implicating then- ANC Provincial Chaireperson David Mabuza in a broader pattern of political violence in the province, including the 2009 assassination of Mohlala. In a 2017 investigative article by Mail & Guardian, former Mbombela mayor Lassy Chiwayo directly accused Mabuza of being "directly or indirectly responsible" for Mohlala’s murder. Mabuza rose to position of Mpumalanga Premier 4 months after the Mohlala assassination.

The article highlighted long-standing claims of Mabuza’s control over local policing structures and referenced multiple political killings in Mpumalanga during his tenure. While ANC officials, including then-provincial secretary Mandla Ndlovu, denied Mabuza’s involvement and no charges were ever filed, the unresolved nature of Mohlala's case continued to fuel speculation, particularly in light of other whistle-blower deaths in the region.

The Democratic Alliance (DA) described Mohlala as a "true democrat who worked ceaselessly for good governance and against all forms of corruption while the Congress of the People (COPE) hailed him for his sacrifices and demanded a full investigation.

Although arrests were made in 2010, including of two police officers, charges were withdrawn due to insufficient evidence. His widow, Bonny Mohlala, has reported being left without updates since 2014.

In 2024, Mpumalanga launched a special unit to investigate political killings, citing Mohlala’s case among others.

Among the theories surrounding his assassination is the alleged involvement of a mysterious Mozambican hitman known only as “Josh”, who was reportedly linked to a network of politically motivated killings in Mpumalanga, particularly during the tenure of Mabuza who many accused of murdering political opponents.

In April 2026, suspended Mpumalanga Police Commissioner Daphney Manamela hosted a media briefing in Mbombela and accused football administrator and businessman Bobby Motaung of giving a bribe totaling 5 million rand to Fannie Masemola. Manamela alleges there is a link between Motaung’s cases and the murder case of Mohlala, who blew the whistle on the construction of the Mbombela Stadium.

== See also ==
- Mbombela Stadium
- David Mabuza
- Corruption in South Africa
- Political assassinations in post-apartheid South Africa
- 2010 FIFA World Cup
