= Mzilikazi wa Afrika =

South African journalist (born 1971)

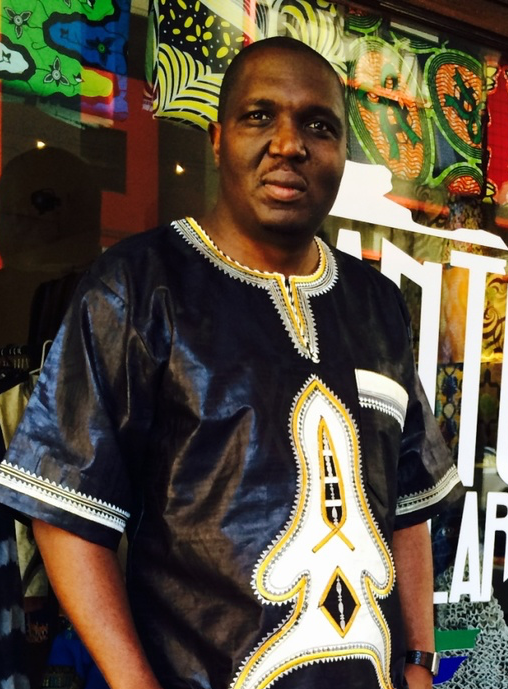
- Mzilikazi wa Afrika at the Durban University of Technology in 2015

Background information
- Born: Leonard Mzilikazi Ndzukula; 26 November 1971 (age 54)
- Origin: Bushbuckridge, Mpumalanga, South Africa
- Occupations: Journalist; Music producer
- Years active: 1995–present

Leonard Mzilikazi Ndzukula, known professionally as Mzilikazi wa Afrika (born 26 November 1971), is a South African investigative journalist, music producer, and author of Nothing Left to Steal. He gained prominence as a journalist for the Sunday Times, where he worked on high-profile investigative reports since 1999. However, in October 2018, he resigned alongside colleague Stephan Hofstatter after the newspaper issued a public apology for certain powerful reports published between 2011 and 2016, which were later questioned for their accuracies and fairness.

Wa Afrika has received multiple awards for his investigative journalism and is the author of Nothing Left to Steal, a book detailing his experiences as a journalist. He is also active in the music industry as a producer, with some of his work focusing on themes of African unity and social justice.

Following his departure from the Sunday Times, he joined the Sunday Independent in April 2019 before moving to Sunday World in November 2023.

== Political killings in Mpumalanga ==
In 2010, Wa Afrika co-authored a series of exposés with journalist Charles Molele about an alleged Mozambican contract killer named 'Josh'. The articles were published in the Sunday Times and Sunday World, which were sister publications at the time, and linked Josh to a wave of political assassinations in Mpumalanga, including the killing of whistleblower Jimmy Mohlala, alleging the involvement of ANC provincial leader and Premier David Mabuza in ordering the assassinations. One of the major scoops involved a 15-page confession reportedly made by Josh at the Nerston border post in front of a judge and government officials.

== Background ==
Mzilikazi wa Afrika's journalism career began in 1995 when he started working as a freelancer for the Witbank News. In 1996, he co-founded Mpumalanga Mirror with his brother, but the newspaper quickly faced financial difficulties and shut down. Undeterred, he sought employment at the now-defunct African Eye News Service (AENS) in Mbombela in 1997. His investigative work at AENS caught the attention of the Sunday Times, which recruited him in 1999. His first major story for the national broadsheet involved exposing the illegal residency and fake qualifications of SABC boss Enoch Sithole, as well as the revelation that the Director-General of the Department of Home Affairs, Albert Mokoena, was running a private basketball team from his government office.

Wa Afrika's most significant career milestone came in 2001 when he broke the Arms Deal scandal with the front-page story, Tony Yengeni, the 4x4 and the R43bn Arms Probe. His reporting led to the conviction of Tony Yengeni for corruption.

== Arrest ==
Mzilikazi wa Afrika was arrested in August 2010 by the South African police on charges of fraud and defeating the ends of justice, which escalated the debate in his country about media freedom and, in light of a proposed Media Appeals Tribunal and Protection of Information Act seeming attempts by the governing African National Congress to curtail it.

Suggestions abound that the arrest was politically motivated, coming as it did just a day after Bheki Cele, reacting to an article by Wa Afrika which detailed the police chief's involvement in a dubitable R500,000,000 lease agreement, described him as "shady" and hinted at reprisal. The Sunday Times subsequently quoted "a senior police official close to the case" as admitting, "Ja, it's political pressure," while Wa Afrika himself claimed to have been asked by his captors "whether I was involved in discrediting senior ANC office bearers in Mpumalanga. That made me wonder whether the police were investigating a criminal or a political case. They also wanted to know who are the big politicians I'm working with behind the scenes. This made me conclude the police were sent by politicians to harass and intimidate me". The prosecution claims that Wa Afrika was in possession of a forged letter of resignation from Mpumalanga premier David Mabuza, whose denial and formal complaint at the Kabokweni police station in Nelspruit it was that culminated in the arrest. The letter, faxed anonymously to The Sunday Times, had yet to be publicised. The arrest took place on Wednesday, 4 August, at 11:15 outside The Sunday Times building in Rosebank, Johannesburg, in spite of the fact that Wa Afrika's lawyer, who has since echoed claims of political meddling, had already negotiated for him to hand himself over at the Kabokweni police station.

Several police vehicles with sirens blaring pulled up alongside wa Afrika outside the Sunday Times building while he was walking to the police station. Police bundled him into an unmarked vehicle and drove off at high speed.

At 19:00 the following day, the newspaper approached the High Court in Pretoria, bringing an urgent application for the journalist's release, which acting Judge Johan Kruger ordered three hours later, following an agreement with the state. Wa Afrika was released at 22:30 and appeared in Nelspruit Regional Court on the next day, 6 August, on charges of fraud, forgery and uttering. He was released on R5,000 bail and ordered to surrender his passports, not to leave the country or interfere with state witnesses, and to report to his nearest police station once a week.

Another suspect in the case, Victor Mlimi, deputy director of the Mpumalanga housing department, was according to his lawyer, Daniel Mabunda, questioned for two hours about the ANC's provincial leadership squabbles and where his own allegiances lie: "I was present when my client was asked, 'Are you destroying the image and integrity of the ANC in Mpumalanga?' I advised my client not to answer that question. It struck me that this has more to do with politics than a criminal case".

Asked by The Sunday Times about the negative impression created by the police's heavy-handed action against wa Afrika, Cele's spokesperson Nonkululeko Mbatha replied,"I cannot undo that impression but the fact of the matter is no one is immune from investigation of what is suspicious of criminal nature. Lastly, insinuations about a directive issued by the general (Cele) to apprehend or intimidate the journalist are incorrect and a figment of imagination." Mabuza's spokesman also denied that he had exerted any pressure on police or that the arrest was an attempt to intimidate the journalist and countermine his investigations into the murders of Mbombela speaker Jimmy Mohlala and provincial arts and culture spokesman Sammy Mpatlanyane, whose names appeared on a "hit list" which emerged in 2009.

== Scandals and fallout with Sunday Times ==
In 2004, Mzilikazi wa Afrika was dismissed from the Sunday Times after it was revealed that he had close ties to businesswoman Soraya Beukes, who had been arrested for defrauding the South African government in the Travelgate scandal. Wa Afrika and his investigative colleagues at Sunday Times had earlier reported on how members of the South African Parliament exploited government-issued travel vouchers, meant for constituency visits, to hire luxury cars and stay in upscale hotels unrelated to their work. Beukes' company, along with other travel agencies, facilitated the scam by submitting fake documents to claim millions of rands from the government for these unauthorized trips.

During the investigation, a police detective revealed in court that Wa Afrika had provided Beukes' contacts to a hotel owner in Mozambique, where he claimed she was "innocent" in the Travelgate scandal and could potentially invest in his hotel. In response to this, Sunday Times management dismissed Wa Afrika for failing to "manage a conflict of interest". However, he was reinstated two years later after joining the Sunday World.

In October 2018, Sunday Times publicly apologized for several stories written by Wa Afrika, Piet Rampedi, and Stephan Hofstatter. The stories, including allegations of police killings in Cato Manor, claims that the South African government illegally deported Zimbabweans to face execution, and reports of a politically-aligned spying unit within the South African Revenue Service (SARS), were later found to be false. The apology was published in a full-page statement titled "We Got it Wrong, And For That We Apologise." In the statement, editor Bongani Siqoko admitted that mistakes were made during the reporting process and acknowledged that the journalists involved had been manipulated by those with ulterior motives.

But we admit here today that something went wrong in the process of gathering the information and reporting the Cato Manor, SARS and Zimbabwean renditions stories. This is after we engaged constructively with all key parties involved in the stories. What is clear is that we committed mistakes and allowed ourselves to be manipulated by those with ulterior motives.

— Bongani Siqoko, 14 October 2018

Following the apology, Wa Afrika and Hofstatter resigned from the newspaper.

== Awards ==
Mzilikazi wa Afrika has scooped a lot of awards since he joined Sunday Times in 1999. Wa Africa's 2012 Taco Kuiper Investigative Journalism Award was returned after the scandal which found that he, investigative unit colleagues Stephan Hoffstatter and Rob Rose did not report an honest truth in their Cato Manor investigative story. Some of his awards include -

- 2013: Vodacom Journalist of the Year Award winner
- 2013 Vodacom Journalist Award Print News Winner
- 2013 Global Shining Light Award winner
- 2012 Standard Bank Sikuvile Journalism Awards (South African Story of the year winner)
- 2012 Standard Bank Sikuvile Journalism Awards (South African Journalist of the year)
- 2012 Standard Bank Sikuvile Journalism Awards (Investigative Journalist Award winner)
- 2012 Taco Kuiper Award for Investigative Journalism winner
- 2011 Vodacom Journalist of the year
- 2011 Vodacom Print News Journalist of the year
- 2011 Vodacom Journalist of the Year Regional winner
- 2011 Taco Kuiper Award for investigative Journalism winner
- 2011 Mondi Shanduka Newspaper Awards (Hard News story winner)
- 2003 Sunday Times Journalist of the Year winner
- 2003 John Manyarara Investigative Journalism Award winner
- 2002 Vodacom Journalist of the Year Regional winner
- 2001 Sunday Times Story of the Year winner
- 2001 Mondi Paper Newspaper Award (South African Story of the Year winner)
- 2001 Mondi Paper Newspaper Award (News writing winner)
- 2001 The Nat Nakasa for Media Integrity Award winner
- 2001 Awarded Honorary Citizenship of Nebraska State USA
- 2001 US Foreign Exchange Fellow for Investigative journalism Scholarship USA
- 2001 Harry Brittain Fellowship England
- 2000 Sunday Times story of the year winner
- 1999 South African Courageous Journalism Award winner
- 1999 Nat Nakasa for Media Integrity Award Winner
