= Mpumalanga killings =

During the late 2000s, there was a political scandal involving the assassinations of African National Congress (ANC) comrades and whistleblowers in Mpumalanga, South Africa. The alleged contract killer at the centre of the scandal was attributed the pseudonym Josh. Publicised in South African media as a Mozambican-born assassin allegedly hired by then-Premier David Mabuza, Josh was alleged to have confessed to multiple politically motivated killings, including the 2009 murder of Jimmy Mohlala, a whistleblower in the 2010 FIFA World Cup tender scandal.

Josh was first introduced to the public in a major front-page exposé titled "Murder Inc in Mbombela" published on 7 February 2010 by journalists Charles Molele and Mzilikazi wa Afrika in the Sunday Times. He was described as a "25-year-old contract killer" who had been offered R 100,000 by an "ANC man" - later understood to refer to Mabuza - to carry out hits on politicians blocking lucrative tender deals. In doing the job, Josh was also promised a government job and he was linked to a wider pattern of political killings in Mpumalanga, suggesting that he had been involved in the deaths of over a dozen individuals, through poisoning or shooting. Though the Sunday Times claimed Josh had agreed to an interview in Mozambique, he reportedly backed out last minute and was never seen publicly before it was reported that he had also died.

== Background and dispute ==
In February 2010, James Nkambule, a former African National Congress Youth League (ANCYL) leader who had defected to COPE, submitted a sworn affidavit to Mpumalanga police, purportedly authored by Josh and which was earlier circulated to media houses. In the widely distributed and reported affidavit, the Josh is confessing to being a contract killer and described a series of chilling operations that included assassinations, poisonings and drug planting, often at the behest of senior African National Congress (ANC) politicians and local business elites. It implicated figures like Bobby Motaung as well as Patric Chirwa, Sibusiso Sigudla and Herbert Theledi. In a follow-up front-page with the Sunday World on 28 February 2010, Molele and Wa Afrika wrote that Josh was also allegedly responsible for the mysterious death of January 'Che' Masilela, an influential figure in Mpumalanga who also mysteriously died and burnt beyond recognition.

Josh claimed to have been brought to South Africa from Mozambique by other syndicates in 2000, originally to smuggle drugs and weapons, and was later allegedly recruited by Mabuza as a "cleaner" – a euphemism for an assassin. He stated he had participated in the assassination of driving school owner Mr. Msiza in KwaNdebele, attempted poisoning of political figures such as James Nkambule and Andries Gamede, and was involved in a failed plot to frame Nelspruit mayor Isiah Khoza by planting drugs at his residence.

Most notably, the affidavit detailed a hit squad that carried out the murder of Jimmy Mohlala in January 2009, death which culminated in the wide circulation of Josh's affidavit. Josh named his alleged co-conspirators – Edgar Muzai, Rogers Ndlovu, Ralph Muzenda and Armando Ferreira – and claimed that after the murder, he was paid a deposit of R100,000. He further alleged that the four co-conspirators were later executed at Elandshoek farm, in the presence of Mabuza and Motaung, to eliminate witnesses. It also alleged the assassination of former Govan Mbeki Local Municipality Chief Financial Officer (CFO) Joshua Ntshuhle, who was killed in 2005 before he was scheduled to testify in a corruption trial involving the municipality's marketing manager Sigudla. Ntshuhle's car was allegedly driven to Malawi to create the illusion that he had fled.

=== Police response and dispute ===
The affidavit triggered a storm of media coverage and public debate. On 8 March 2010, Mpumalanga Provincial Police Commissioner, Thulani Ntobela, confirmed that police had received the affidavit from Nkambule, but emphasized that investigations had failed to locate Josh. "We have been unable to get cooperation from people who claim to know Josh," he said. Police spokesperson Leonard Hlathi added, "We don't have a person called Josh."

The day before, on 7 March 2010, The Sunday Independent reported that Nkambule claimed Josh was unable to meet police because he had to attend his mother's funeral in Mozambique. Nkambule said police agreed to let Josh mourn in peace, but police denied this version. On 25 April 2010, the Sunday Times led another piece on Josh, claiming that Josh had met with a Pretoria High Court judge and seven senior officials at the Nerston border post, where Josh reportedly made a 15-page handwritten confession naming high-profile political and business figures as the masterminds behind the killings. The police arrested Nkambule and charged him with fraud and defeating the ends of justice, on grounds that he had fabricated the affidavit. Soon after Nkambule's arrest, Josh reportedly vanished into Eswatini and was later reported to be someone who had also died.

"We are eagerly awaiting the start of the trial because this man (Nkambule) has made many defamatory allegations against the premier," one of David Mabuza's supporters told journalists outside the Nelspruit Magistrates Court as Nkambule made one of his appearances on 11 July 2010 on fraud charges. "The case will provide answers to a number of mysteries and our premier's good name will be cleared"., Sowetan, 12 July 2010

Nkambule died on 7 October 2010 at his home in Barberton, allegedly from poisoning, becoming the 10th person involved in the Mpumalanga political saga to die under mysterious circumstances.
