= Mbombela Stadium =

Sports stadium in South Africa

- Africa's Wildest Stadium
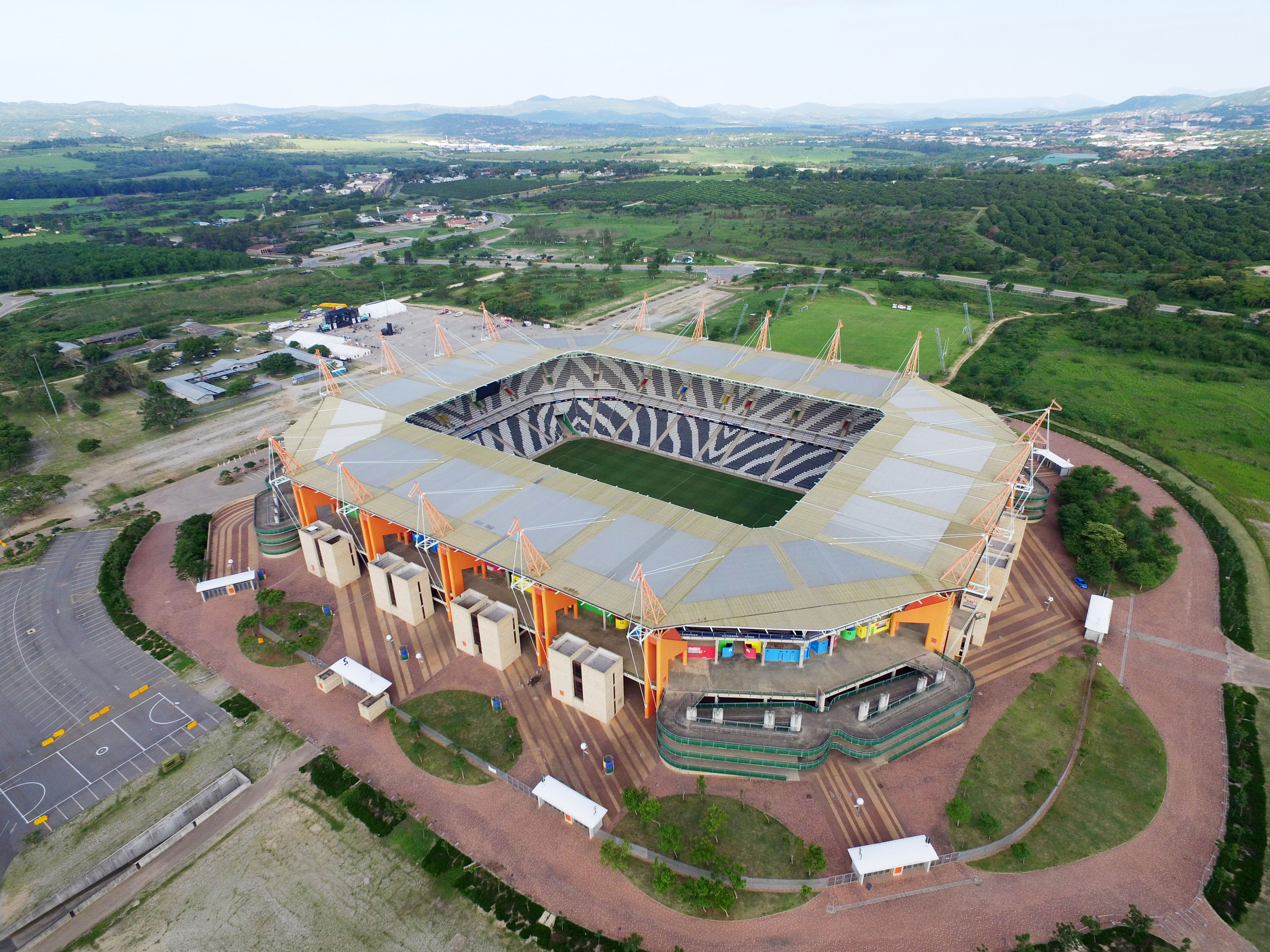
- The aerial view of Mbombela Stadium
- Interactive map of Mbombela Stadium
- Full name: Mbombela Stadium
- Location: 1 Bafana Road, Nelspruit
- Coordinates: 25°27′40″S 30°55′44″E
- Owner: Mbombela Local Municipality
- Operator: Platinum Sport
- Capacity: 43,500
- Surface: Rye grass & Desso GrassMaster

Construction
- Groundbreaking: February 2007
- Built: 2007–2009
- Opened: 15 October 2009; 17 years ago
- Cost: Rand 1.05 billion (US$ 199 million)
- Architect: R&L Architects Mike Bell

Tenants
- Pumas (Currie Cup) (2010–present); TS Galaxy (Premiership) (2020–present)

The Mbombela Stadium is a football and Rugby union all-seater stadium in Mbombela in the Mpumalanga province of South Africa. It was one of 10 venues for the 2010 FIFA World Cup and one of 5 newly constructed stadiums for the tournament. It is the home ground to the soccer team TS Galaxy, who play in the Premiership, and the Pumas rugby team. It is an all-seater stadium, with 43,500 seats, almost all under roof.

It is located 6 kilometres west of Mbombela, the capital of the Mpumalanga province and is the largest venue in the province. The R1,050-million facility was ready for use well ahead of the June 2010 World Cup kickoff and was funded entirely through central government taxpayer funding, requiring no financing by the city.

== Construction ==
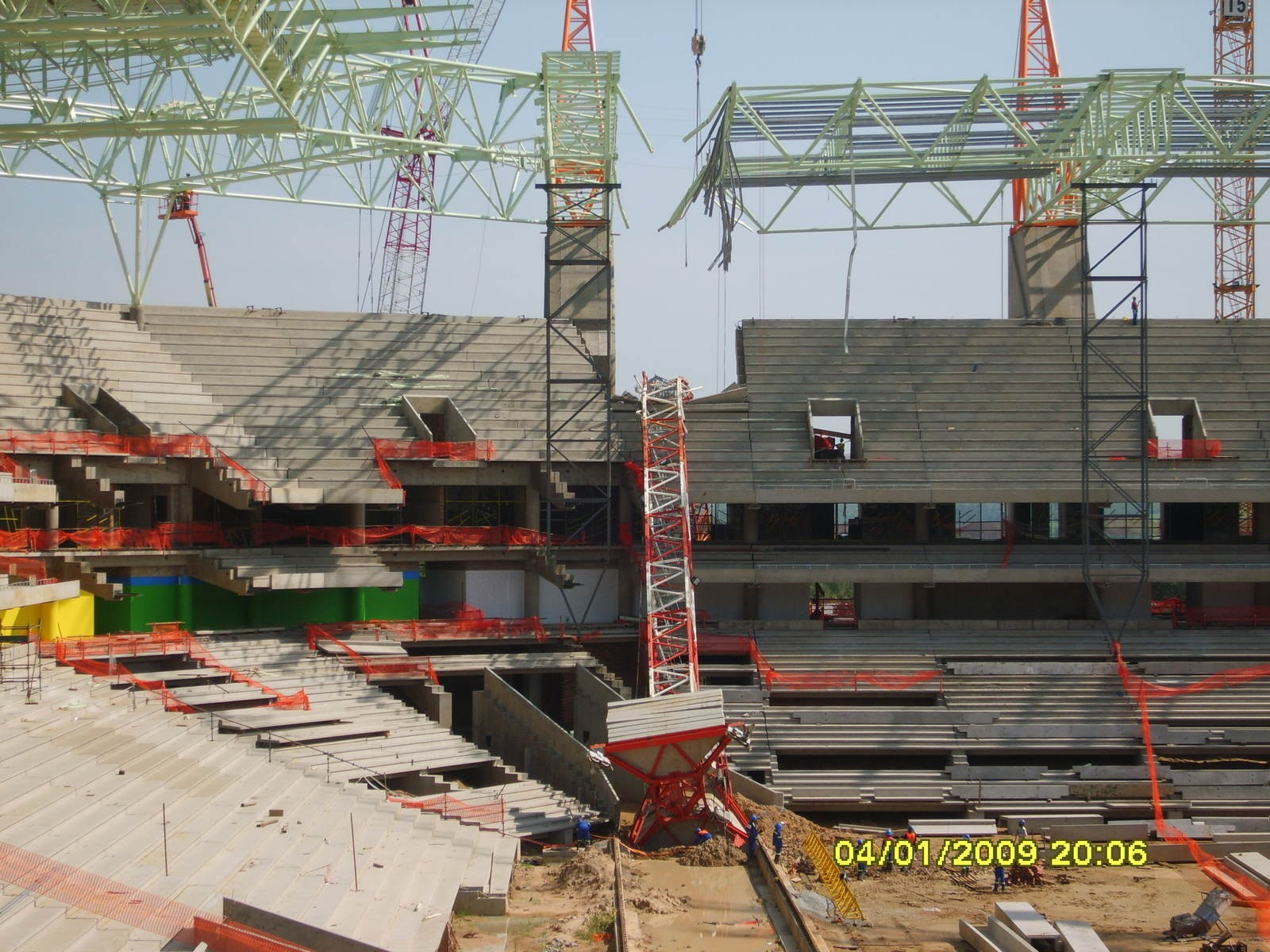
A freak storm on the evening of 4 January 2009 blew over a construction tower crane which crashed through the partially completed roof structure and the concrete setaing terraces structures. This is the internal view.

Construction commenced in February 2007 and was completed in November 2009. The construction contract was awarded to a South African–French consortium of Basil Read Construction and Bouygues.

The structure is founded on 1,500 piles on a 10m structural grid. Each roof support (in the shape of a giraffe) sits on 18 piles on the 30m major structural bay. The 10m span seating beams are prestressed and most of the 3,170 units were pre-cast on site.

The project was subjected to numerous wildcat strikes. With the 5th and final strike, all main contract labourers were dismissed. All subsequent work was performed by subcontractors.

During a freak storm in January 2009, a tower crane blew over and cut through the partially completed roof. The site was unoccupied at the time and there were no injuries. The construction required a total of 5.5 million man-hours to complete.

The site accident history was exceptionally safe with the worst injury being a broken ankle. A record was set of 2.4 million consecutive injury-free hours.

== Design ==
The stadium design reflects its inter-relation with the nearby Kruger National Park. The signature feature of the stadium are the 18 roof supports that resemble giraffes. The seats are patterned with zebra stripes. Visitors to the venue can easily add on a side-trip to the game reserve.

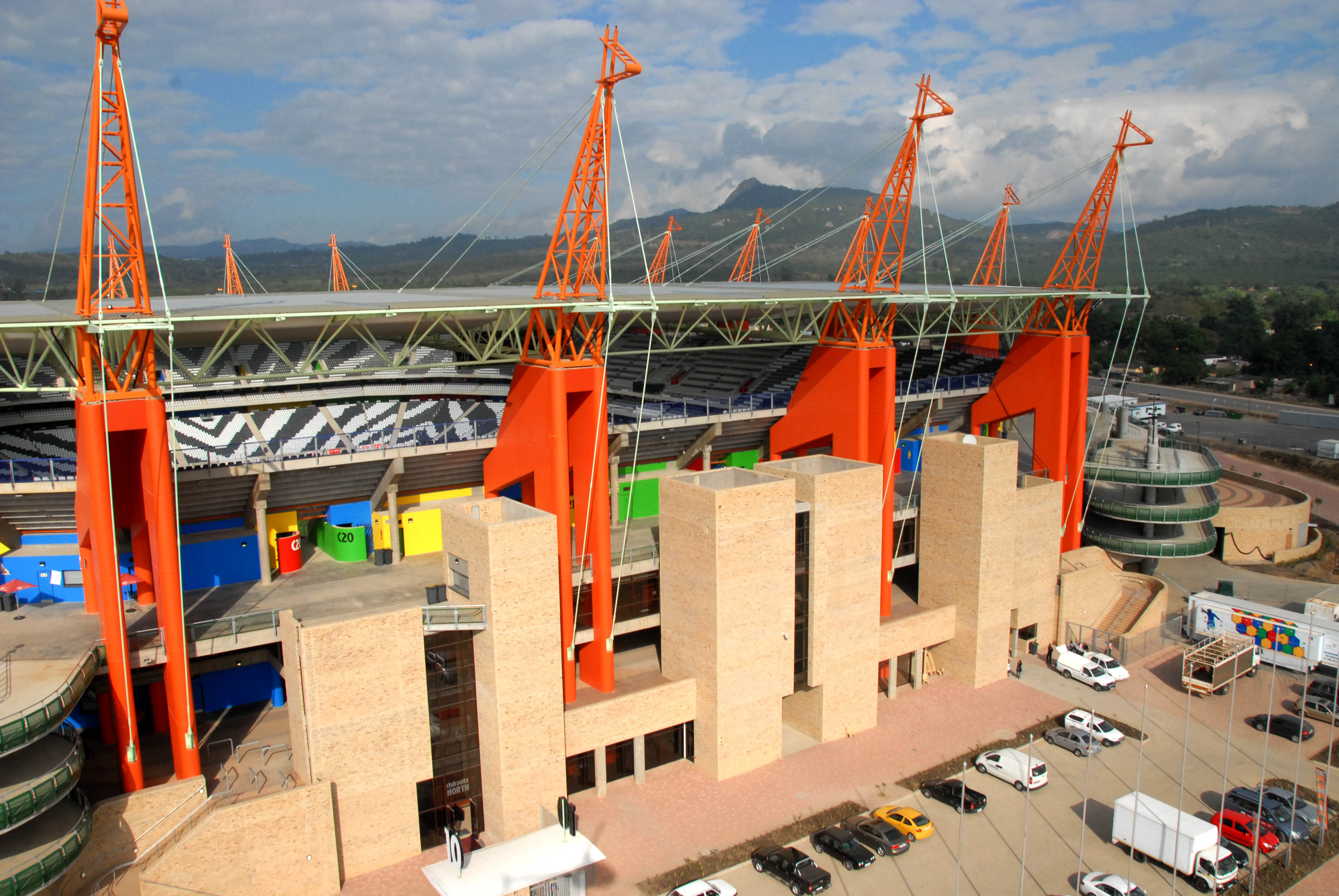
Aerial close up view of the roof support columns that resemble giraffe

=== Seating ===
The bowl design aimed to put every seat as close as practical to the field action and maintain excellent sightlines over the heads of spectators. This venue is the most compact arena of all 2010 venues. Most seats are covered by the cantilever roof.

The seating capacity is 43,500. In FIFA WC configuration it seated 40,929 with regular seats lost to the media tribune. The seating is divided into 3 tiers with 21,000 lower tier, 3,500 middle tier and 19,000 on the upper tier. The upper tier is accessed by 8 wide ramps located on the corners. The ramps accommodates small delivery vehicles. The middle tier, which is accessed by elevators, has premium seating with a VIP lounge, restaurant, club lounges and 25 private boxes.

=== Pitch ===
The pitch is sized for association football (105x68m) and Rugby Union (100x70m). It is floodlit to 2,200 lux to meet FIFA requirements which is on full backup power from diesel generators. The cool season rye grass pitch grown from seed is reinforced with Desso GrassMaster artificial turf fibres which anchor the field, creating what is essentially a semi-synthetic pitch for a stable and a level grass surface and has no problem standing up to extreme abuse during a rugby scrum.

The pitch was the cause of great concern and some ridicule 5 months before the World Cup, but its perfect performance in its first real test on 16 May 2010 silenced the critics.

The selection of rye grass was a directive from FIFA specifically for the World Cup. It is not an ideal grass type for the very hot and humid summer conditions common in Mbombela. In January 2013 an unfortunate and unusual long spell of unbroken rainy and weather caused a grass fungus which killed off most of the grass in the run-up to the 2013 African Cup of Nations. Concerns were raised over the playing surface with Togo striker Emmanuel Adebayor describing it as "sandy" and "a disgrace". He went on to say "At the end of the day we are all African and we have to be honest with ourselves. It's a beautiful stadium but the pitch is not happening".

Subsequent to the pitch failure of AFCON 2013 during summer cynodon is grown which provides a robust and dependable surface during the hot climate. The cynodon is dormant in winter when the rye grass flourishes.

=== Roof ===
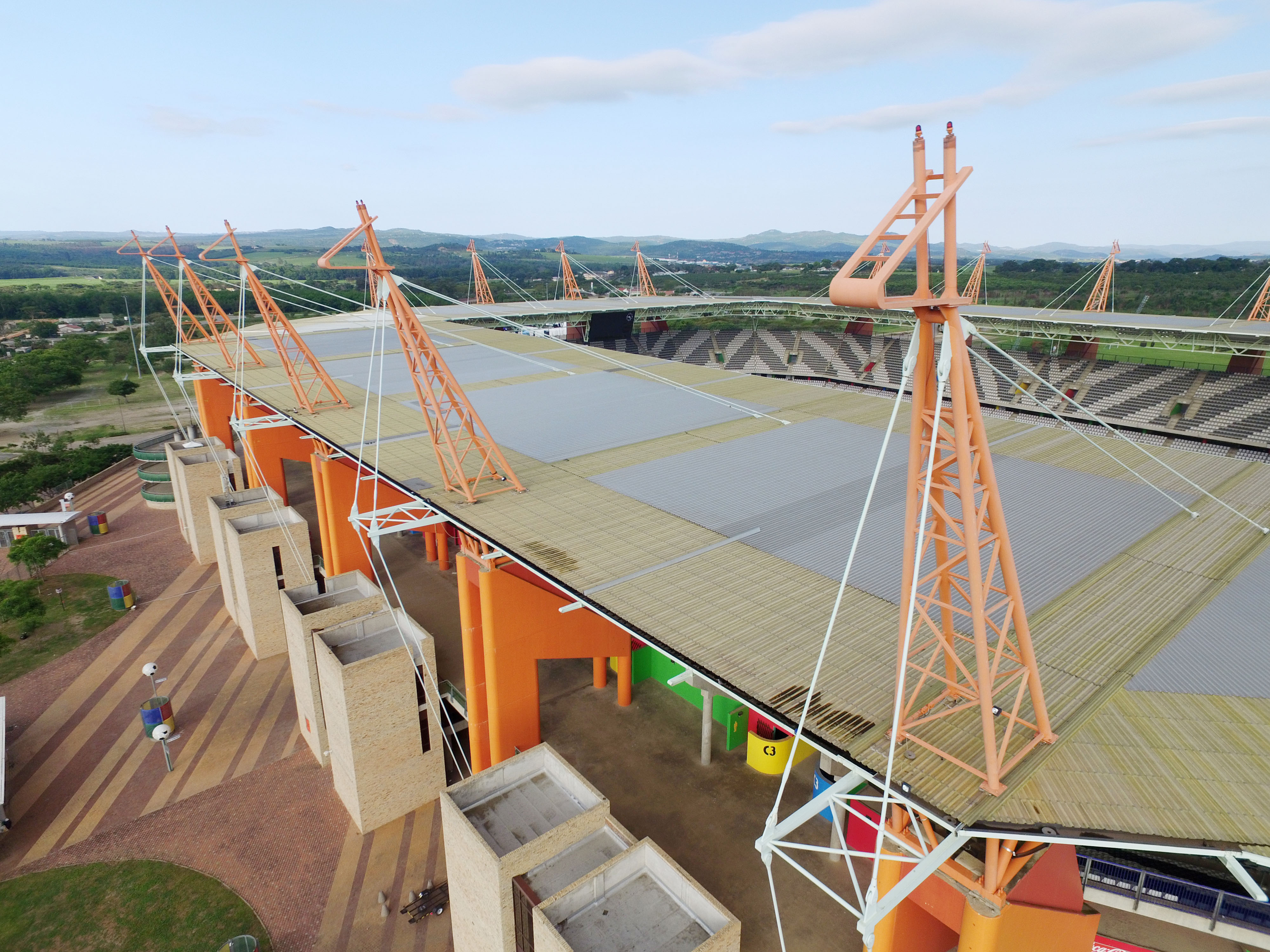
Aerial close up view of the roof support columns that resemble giraffe

The 1,450 tonne roof covers an area of 22,500 square metres and 94% of the seats. At 55 kg/sqm its super lightweight efficient design kept roof cost in check and meant almost all seats are under roof. The roof is 35m above the pitch. Half of the roof is translucent to maximise sunlight to the pitch and to lighten the seating bowl. The roof appears to float above the top of the seating bowl with an 8 m gap to provide ventilation in the hot climate and also to provide views to the surrounding hills from the seats.

The structure is a propped cantilever on a 30 m module with the steel towers for the tension rods doubling as symbolic giraffe necks. The floor of the service catwalk is 110mm thick concrete acting as ballast to resist wind uplift.

== Controversies and corruption ==
Allegations of corruption relating to the awarding of construction contracts in the building of the stadium plagued the project. At least three individuals were murdered in connection with the allegations, and another three have died under mysterious circumstances.

=== Assassination ===
The Speaker of the Mbombela Council, Jimmy Mohlala had been a longstanding and vocal critic of corruption in the province. In late 2008 Mohlala began legal steps to cancel the Lefika Emerging Equity design contract for the new stadium based on a fraudulent tax clearance certificate submitted as part their design tender document. He called for a criminal case against soccer boss Bobby Motaung for reportedly forging a Mbombela council letter with a fake signature of former Mbombela municipal manager Sgananda Siboza to obtain an overdraft from a bank. Shortly after taking these steps, in January 2009, Mohlala was brutally assassinated outside his residence in front of his son. Allegations have been made repeatedly that Bobby Motaung and David Mabuza organised the murder of Mohlala. The assassination was later linked in media reports to Josh, a mysterious figure who allegedly confessed to carrying out hits on behalf of senior political figures. David Mabuza was Premier of the Mpumalanga Province at the time and was in 2018 appointed Deputy President of South Africa. For more detailed investigative journalistic accounts around his death read the online articles:.

=== Corruption ===
Cancellation of the Design Contract

Lefika Emerging Equity won the design contract for the stadium in April 2006. Lefika was composed of three businessmen. Bobby Motaung, manager of Kaiser Chiefs football club, Herbert Theledi, a businessman with powerful provincial connections, and Chris Grib, a minority shareholder in Lefika and CEO tasked with day-to-day running of the company. Chris Grib left the country in late 2008 under a cloud when it came to light that the SA Revenue Services tax clearance document required to win the design contract was fraudulent. After Jimmy Mohlala was assassinated weeks after he attempted to cancel the design contract, the balance of the construction till completion proceeded with Lefika effectively absent, but still earning their professional fees. No officials were brave enough to continue attempts to cancel the design contract.

Arrests

Despite their wrongdoings being widely reported, Lefika enjoyed political protection by the provincial ANC under the leadership of premier David Mabuza and the Jacob Zuma-faction who reportedly suppressed the powerful evidence against Lefika and blocked legal prosecution against them for three years. On 15 August 2012, all three Lefika directors were arrested for tender fraud related to the stadium's design contract by the Special Investigations Unit, known as the Hawks, an independent national investigations unit. All three were released on bail and returned to court on 15 October 2012. Chris Grib was out of the country when Jimmy Mohlala was murdered and when Lefika forged a document on a Municipal letter head used to apply for a R1 million overdraft from Nedbank so he was expected to testify against his co-directors Motaung and Theledi under a plea deal for a lesser sentence. The case was heard but charges later dropped. In January 2016 the case was re-investigated and the reinstatement of charges was being considered by the National Prosecuting Authority however nothing came of this. By July 2016 the case was struck off the roll due to a lack of evidence among talk of Bobby Motaung intimidating witnesses from testifying. In November 2017 the National Prosecuting Authority announced that the fraud case would no longer be pursued for lack of evidence. The dropping of charges were reportedly due to Zuma-faction members within the National Prosecuting Authority suppressing the evidence.

In April 2026, suspended Mpumalanga Police Commissioner Daphney Manamela hosted a media briefing in Mbombela and accused football administrator and businessman Bobby Motaung of giving a bribe totaling 5 million rand to Fannie Masemola. Manamela alleges there is a link between Motaung’s cases and the murder case of Mohlala, who blew the whistle on the construction of the Mbombela Stadium.

Municipality placed under Administration

Corruption related to general municipal mismanagement and the construction of the stadium resulted in the provincial government taking over the running of the municipality and construction management. The Municipality was placed under administration in June 2007. When the Mbombela Municipality was reinstated 5 months later, the outspoken new mayor Lassie Chiwayo and council officials reportedly received death threats, warning them to remain silent about the evidence of corruption.

=== Lowest cost new 2010 stadium ===
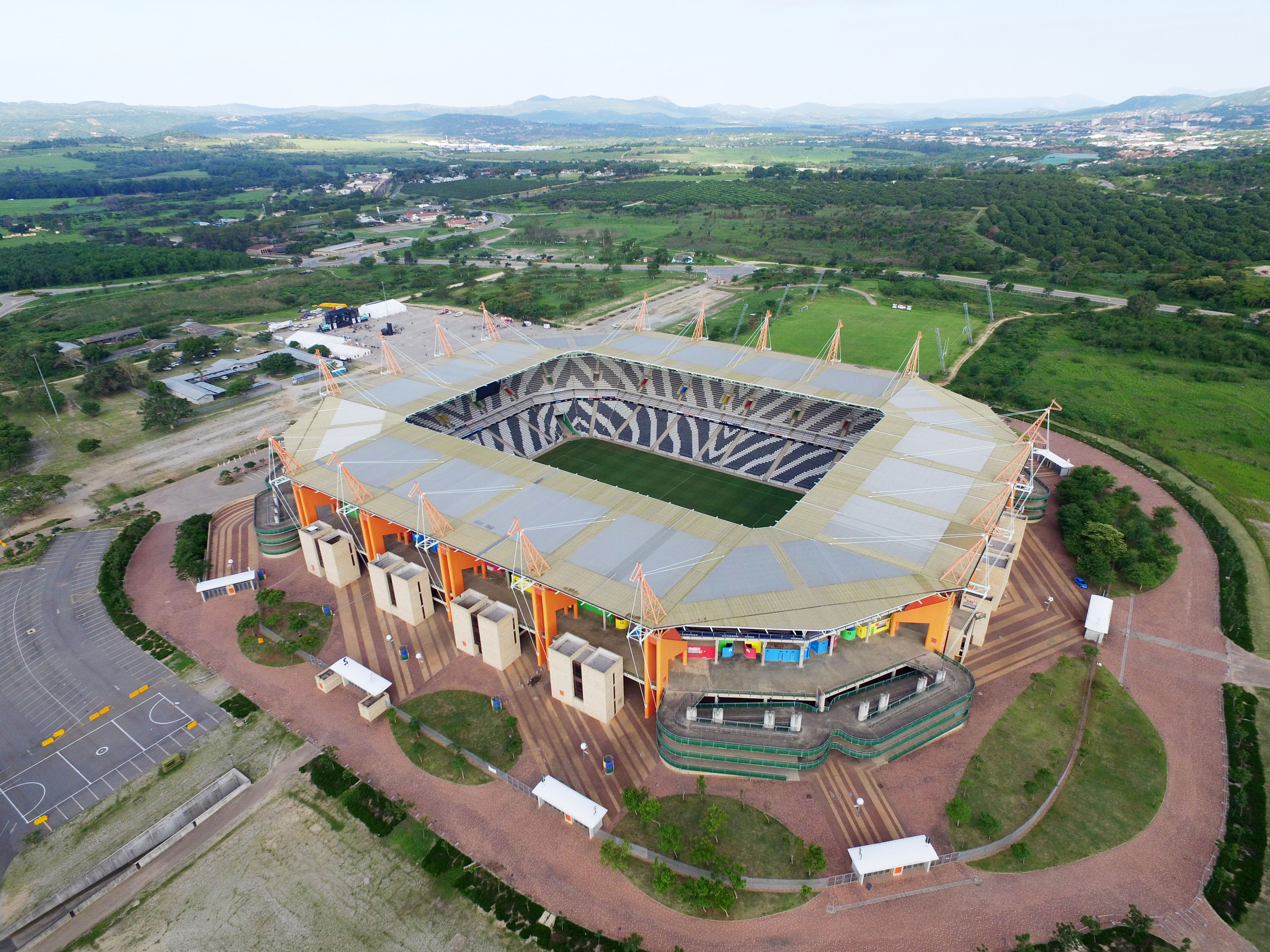
Stadium Aerial view with Nelspruit in context

Although the stadium is widely known for corruption it is ironic that the stadium became a model in terms of the lowest total cost. Mbombela Stadium stands out as being the lowest-cost new 2010 stadium by quite a large margin and the highest ratio of seats under roof.

Corruption was reported about other World Cup-related contracts, however the stadium construction itself proceeded without any controversy. Attempted manipulation of stadium construction sub-contracts by Lefika was successfully blocked by principled officials within the Municipality and the Project Manager.

The worst erroneous spending that has come to light was a very expensive sod turning ceremony costing more than R2 million, and a R590,000 invoice for a business plan that was inflated to R2.4 million by Lefika, with payment forced through by the municipal manager Jacob Dladla. It was reported that an expensive car was purchased as a gift for Dladla at the time. He was arrested on related charges in October 2012 and released on bail.

Stadium	Cost	% seats under roof
Mbombela Stadium	Rand 1.05 billion (US$ 150 million)	94%
Peter Mokaba Stadium	Rand 1.24 billion (US$ 165 million)	28%
Nelson Mandela Bay Stadium	Rand 2.1 billion (US$ 280 million)	69%
Soccer City	Rand 3.3 billion (US$ 440 million)	66%
Moses Mabihda Stadium	Rand 3.4 billion (US$ 450 million)	90%
Cape Town Stadium	Rand 4.4 billion (US$ 580 million)	94%

=== Local community ===
Promises of improvements to Mattafin, the impoverished surrounding township have not been fulfilled. Students from the local primary and high schools had to be relocated to container classrooms and the old schools used by the General Contractor. It took multiple violent protests to get the authorities to finally build the new schools 3 years after they were promised. The land belonging to the Matsafeni trust was secretly sold for R1 by Mattafin community leaders to the Mbombela Local Municipality for the new stadium in exchange for other rights. The sale was set aside three years later when the community launched a legal challenge and reinstated with a market related price.

=== Wetland ===
To make way for a replacement school, a wetland was bulldozed, but no environmental impact assessment was done before the wetland was destroyed.

== Tournament results ==
=== 2010 FIFA World Cup ===
Date	Time (UTC+2)	Team No. 1	Result	Team No. 2	Round	Attendance
16 June 2010	13:30	Honduras	0–1	Chile	Group H	32,664
20 June 2010	16:00	Italy	1–1	New Zealand	Group F	38,229
23 June 2010	20:30	Australia	2–1	Serbia	Group D	37,836
25 June 2010	16:00	North Korea	0–3	Ivory Coast	Group G	34,763

=== 2013 African Cup of Nations ===
Date	Time (UTC+2)	Team No. 1	Result	Team No. 2	Round	Attendance
21 January 2013	17:00	Zambia	1–1	Ethiopia	Group C	15,500
21 January 2013	20:00	Nigeria	1–1	Burkina Faso	Group C	13,500
25 January 2013	17:00	Zambia	1–1	Nigeria	Group C	25,000
25 January 2013	20:00	Burkina Faso	4–0	Ethiopia	Group C	35,000
29 January 2013	19:00	Zambia	0–0	Burkina Faso	Group C	8,000
30 January 2013	18:30	Togo	1–1	Tunisia	Group D	7,500
3 February 2013	18:30	Burkina Faso	1–0 (a.e.t.)	Togo	Quarter-final	27,000
6 February 2013	18:30	Burkina Faso	1–1 (a.e.t.) (3–2 pen.)	Ghana	Semi-final	30,000

== Inaugural game ==
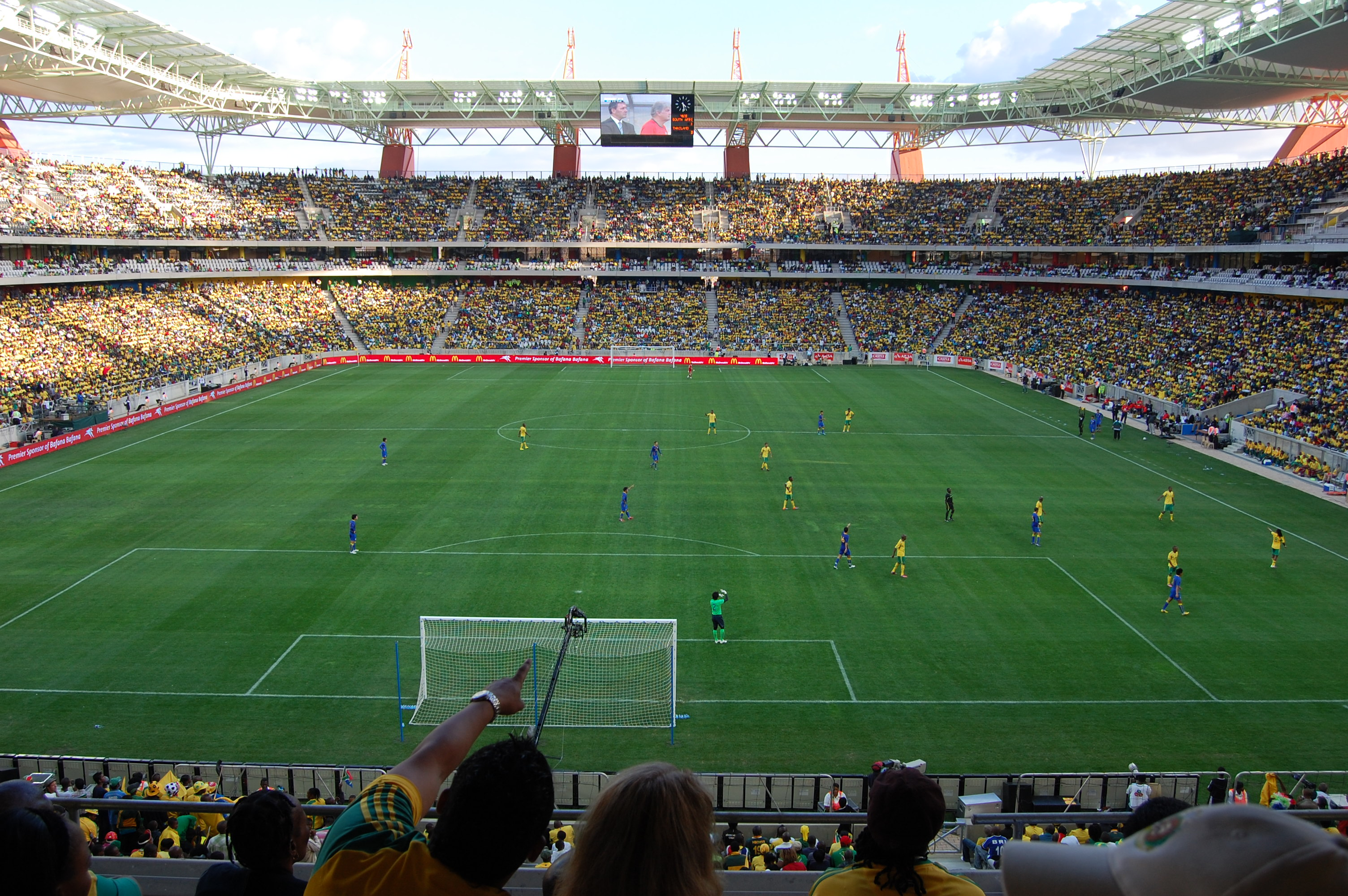
Bafana Bafana vs Thailand. The inaugural stadium match.

On 16 May 2010, the stadium was officially opened with an international friendly match between South Africa and Thailand. South Africa won 4–0, leading 3–0 at half time.

== After the World Cup ==
The stadium has been managed since after the World Cup, under contract, by Platinum Sport Consulting. Because it is the only large venue in the province it has had high utilisation in contrast to expectations that it would not serve much purpose after the World Cup.

== Rugby ==
The Pumas are the main rugby tenants. They play most Currie Cup matches at the stadium.

The stadium held its first rugby match on 27 August 2010. The Pumas hosted the Blue Bulls in a 2010 Currie Cup match. Pumas won 22–21, trailing 10–11 at half time.

The Pumas made use of the stadium again, when they hosted Western Province on 17 September 2010. Western Province won the match 62–10.

The country's national team, popularly known as the Springboks, played their first match at the stadium against Scotland on 15 June 2013. This match was the second half of a doubleheader, with the curtain-raiser being a matchup between Samoa and Italy. The two composed the second round of a one-off four-team tournament that served partly as a warm-up for the Boks' 2013 Rugby Championship campaign.

South Africa hosted Wales at the stadium on 21 June 2014 in the second test of Wales' 2014 South African tour. The Springboks won the match 31–30.

The Boks played Argentina at the stadium on 20 August 2016. The Springboks won 30–23.

The All Blacks were due to play against the Boks at Mbombela Stadium on 26 September 2020 but the game was cancelled due the COVID-19 pandemic. The rescheduled match was held on 6 August 2022, with South Africa winning 26–10.

The Springboks played Argentina again on 28th September 2024 to a sold out Mbombela Stadium (crowd of 43 578 people). The Springboks won 48-7

== Soccer ==
The stadium has been used numerous times by the South African national team since the World Cup. As of October 2025, they had won seven and drawn four of their eleven games there.

The stadium played host to an embarrassing incident for the team when, after believing they needed a draw in a qualifier for the 2012 Africa Cup of Nations, the team celebrated their supposed achievement, only to find they had miscalculated, and had missed out on qualification.

The stadium also played host to the team's final qualifier for the 2026 FIFA World Cup, with South Africa defeating Rwanda 3-0 to qualify for the World Cup for the first time since 2002 (having hosted it in 2010).

On 14 November 2010, the stadium hosted its first Premiership match. Wits moved their match against Mamelodi Sundowns to the stadium.

In September 2020, TS Galaxy purchased a place in the Premiership, and have since played their home games at the stadium.

== See also ==
- FIFA
- FIFA Men's World Rankings
- FIFA Women's World Cup
- FIFA Women's World Rankings
- List of stadiums in South Africa
- South Africa national football team
- Lists of stadiums
