= Nonhlanhla Patience Mnisi =

South African real estate agent

- Occupation: Real estate agent
- Employer: Pam Golding Properties
- Spouse: David Mabuza

Nonhlanhla Patience Mnisi is a South African real estate agent based in Mpumalanga. She has worked for Pam Golding Properties since 2012, serving the Barberton areas.

== Personal life ==
Mnisi was the wife of David Mabuza, the country's former deputy president, who died in July 2025. Mnisi and Mabuza have children together.

== Legal matters ==
In September 2025, Mnisi came into public view when she asserted that she was the sole nominated beneficiary of her late husband David Mabuza's approximately R 44.7 million living annuity, administered by Alexander Forbes Financial Services. She maintained that any claims by other of Mabuza's children from previous marriage should be pursued through his estate rather than the pension fund itself.

Mnisi's status as widow and the nomination of her being the sole beneficiary of Mabuza's pension was challenged in court by Mabuza's daughter, Tamara Silinda together with her mother, Ruth Funi Silinda (Mabuza's ex-customary wife) and they asked the Mpumalanga High Court to interdict Alexander Forbes from disbursing the annuity until their rights were adjudicated.

Members of the Mabuza family publicly supported Tamara's claim and slammed Mnisi. Mabuza's sister Zandile Mabuza attended the hearing at the Mpumalanga High Court and described the widow's stance as "selfish" in the dispute over the R44.7 million pension fund, choosing herself over the late husband's kids. Lindeni Mabuza, another of his children, also said outside court: "We came to support our half-sister Tamara ... All the items she wanted to address, we [also] wanted to address."

The court intervened in the case because of significant document and beneficiary-disclosure issues. On 23 September 2025 Judge Johannes Hendrickus Roelofse of the Mpumalanga High Court ordered Alexander Forbes to explain in affidavit form the discrepancies between the policy schedule and policy document concerning the living annuity. He said he could not make a final decision when faced with conflicting documents. Then, on 30 September 2025 the court interdicted Alexander Forbes from disbursing any portion of the R44.7 million to Mnisi until all parties' rights were resolved. The judge warned that the funds risked being lost and emphasised the need to protect dependants who might otherwise be excluded. In its ruling the court emphasised that it was not yet satisfied that Mnisi's claim to be the sole beneficiary was incontestable, and noted the strong possibility that other dependants (including children from prior relationships) could also legitimately claim under section 37C of the Pension Funds Act.

Mnisi responded in her court papers denying the challenge by the Silindas who claimed she obtained marital certificate after Mabuza's death and Mnisi asserted her marriage certificate was valid. She argued that the application for maintenance from Tamara and her mother was mis-directed (via the pension fund rather than the estate) and described the urgency claimed by their side as self-made.

The case brought to the public the late politician's hidden family feud and the broader legal and cultural questions about customary marriages, posthumous registration of unions, nominations of beneficiaries, and how dependants are treated under South African pension and estate law.
