= Cengi Mahlalela =

South African politician (1957–2000)

Member of the National Assembly
- In office June 1999 – 6 December 2000
- Constituency: Mpumalanga

Personal details
- Born: 12 January 1957
- Died: 6 December 2000 (aged 43)
- Citizenship: South Africa
- Party: African National Congress

Cengi Christine Mahlalela (12 January 1957 – 6 December 2000) was a South African politician who represented the African National Congress (ANC) in the National Assembly from June 1999 until her death in December 2000.

Born on 12 January 1957, Mahlalela was elected to the assembly in the 1999 general election, ranked second on the ANC's regional party list for Mpumalanga. She died on 6 December 2000 and was replaced by Lassy Chiwayo.
