= Nothing Left to Steal =

South African 2014 memoir

Nothing Left to Steal: Jailed for telling the truth
- Author: Mzilikazi wa Afrika
- Language: English
- Subject: Investigative journalism; Corruption; Memoir
- Genre: Non-fiction, autobiography
- Publisher: Penguin Random House South Africa
- Publication date: 20 August 2014
- Publication place: South Africa
- Media type: Print (Paperback)
- Pages: 288
- ISBN: 9780143538929

Nothing Left to Steal is a 2014 memoir by South African investigative journalist Mzilikazi wa Afrika. Published by Penguin Random House South Africa, the book recounts Wa Afrika's personal journey from a neglected child in a rural village to one of the country’s most acclaimed journalists, tackling high-profile corruption.

== Overview ==
The book chronicles the author's personal journey from rural poverty in the Mpumalanga village of Bushbuckridge to becoming one of the country’s most prominent and fearless investigative journalists. It also recounts his major journalistic exposés of corruption, crime, and abuse of power in post- apartheid South Africa.

The memoir blends personal narrative with journalistic reflection, covering Wa Afrika’s early life under apartheid, his decision to abandon a well-paying corporate marketing job for journalism, and his work with news outlets such as African Eye News Service (AENS), Sunday Times, and Sunday World. He shares behind-the-scenes accounts of several major investigations, including:

- The R1.7 billion Pretoria building lease scandal involving then-police commissioner Bheki Cele and businessman Roux Shabangu, which led to Wa Afrika’s controversial arrest in 2010. The exposé led to the dismissal of Cele and Gwen Mahlangu-Nkabinde
- Exposés on the arms deal which led to the imprisonment of Tony Yengeni
- Exposing Dina Pule, and Mac Maharaj, among others.
- Investigations into slavery rings, political assassinations in Mpumalanga, and widespread state corruption.

Already a feared and towering figure in the media with multiple awards, his controversial arrest in 2010 put him further into the national spotlight and led to outcry over the South African government's encroachment on media freedom.

He was raised in Bushbuckridge and began his career in 1995 with the Witbank News and AENS before being headhunted by the Sunday Times in 1999. The memoir details his rise in the journalism industry, and the personal and professional challenges he faced while holding powerful figures accountable. It is a story of his unwavering dedication to democracy, justice and the fight against corruption, serving as a testament to the power of investigative journalism.

He chronicled an earlier, harrowing experience in his career with the Sunday Times where he infiltrated a human trafficking ring operating between Mozambique and South Africa, during which his identity was uncovered by the human trafficking boss and which led to him being beaten, abducted and nearly killed.

The book is divided into two main sections:

The First Testament: Covers the early phases of his career and the challenges he faced while climbing the journalism ladder.

The Second Testament: Focuses on his major investigations, including the arms deal and lease scandal, and the consequences of his fearless journalism.

== Author ==
Mzilikazi wa Afrika is a journalist who has worked for some of South Africa’s leading newspapers, including the African Eye News Service (AENS), Sunday Times and Sunday World. In addition to his journalism career, he is also a musician and producer, having released the deep-house album The Icon in 2008. He has served as chairperson of the Forum for African Investigative Reporters and sat on the board of the Global Investigative Journalism Network.

== Reception ==
Nothing Left to Steal was praised for its candidness, courage, and critical insight into South Africa’s political and journalistic landscape. It was particularly lauded for shedding light on the risks faced by investigative journalists in a politically charged environment. According to Frans Legodi, a lawyer who represented Wa Afrika during his arrest in the 1980s under apartheid on allegations of involvement with Umkhonto we Sizwe (MK)’s arms network, many readers might struggle to believe the memoir is non-fiction. He suggests that outsiders cannot truly grasp the harsh realities faced by young people growing up in Bushbuckridge during that time - hardships so extreme, they seem almost unbelievable that one could make it under those conditions.
