= David Mabuza =

Deputy President of South Africa from 2018 to 2023

His Excellency David Mabuza
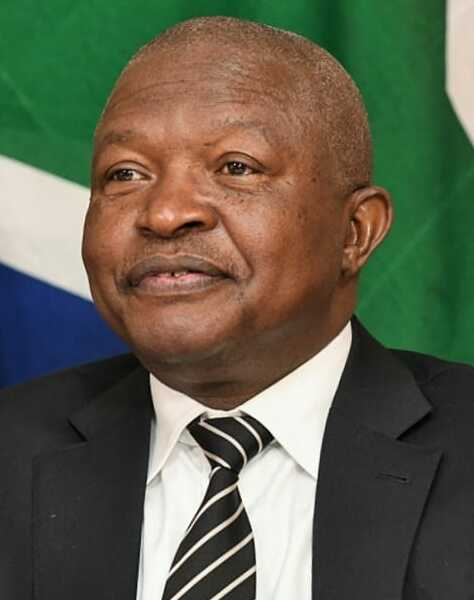
- Mabuza in 2022

8th Deputy President of South Africa
- In office 27 February 2018 – 28 February 2023
- President: Cyril Ramaphosa
- Preceded by: Cyril Ramaphosa
- Succeeded by: Paul Mashatile

10th Deputy President of the African National Congress
- In office 18 December 2017 – 19 December 2022
- President: Cyril Ramaphosa
- Preceded by: Cyril Ramaphosa
- Succeeded by: Paul Mashatile

Member of the National Assembly
- In office 26 February 2018 – 28 February 2023
- Preceded by: James Skosana
- Succeeded by: Humphrey Mmemezi
- Constituency: Mpumalanga

4th Premier of Mpumalanga
- In office 6 May 2009 – 26 February 2018
- Preceded by: Thabang Makwetla
- Succeeded by: Refilwe Mtsweni-Tsipane

Provincial Chairperson of the African National Congress in Mpumalanga
- In office August 2008 – 2015
- Deputy: Charles Makola; David Dube; Violet Siwela
- Preceded by: Thabang Makwetla
- Succeeded by: Mandla Ndlovu

Member of the Mpumalanga Provincial Legislature
- In office May 1994 – 26 February 2018

Personal details
- Born: David Dabede Mabuza; 25 August 1960 Phola, South Africa
- Died: 3 July 2025 (aged 64) Sandton, South Africa
- Party: African National Congress
- Spouses: Ruth Funi Silinda (divorced); Nonhlanhla Patience Mnisi
- Children: Mxolisi Mabuza; Angela Mabuza; Tamara Silinda
- Relatives: Mike Mabuza (brother); Zandile Mabuza (youngest sister)
- Education: University of South Africa
- Occupation: Politician; teacher; philanthropist; activist

David Dabede Mabuza (25 August 1960 – 3 July 2025), also known as DD Mabuza, was a South African politician who served as deputy president of South Africa from February 2018 to February 2023. He was the deputy president of the African National Congress (ANC) from December 2017 to December 2022 and was previously the premier of Mpumalanga from 2009 to 2018, throughout the presidency of his onetime political ally Jacob Zuma. Mabuza served as a Member of Parliament from 2018 until his resignation in 2023.

A native of rural Mpumalanga and a teacher by training, Mabuza's initial engagement in politics was through the Black Consciousness movement, while he was a student, and then through teachers' unions; he was chairperson of the South African Democratic Teachers Union, an affiliate of the influential Congress of South African Trade Unions, from 1988 to 1991. After the end of apartheid in 1994, he joined the Mpumalanga provincial legislature as an ANC representative and took up a series of ministerial posts in the Mpumalanga Executive Council. He was elected to the ANC National Executive Committee for the first time in 2007 and was ANC provincial chairperson in Mpumalanga from 2008 to 2017, throughout his premiership.

Mabuza's politics during his career were described as populist. Through a rigorous recruitment drive, he increased the size and influence of the Mpumalanga branch of the ANC and, with Ace Magashule and Supra Mahumapelo, was part of the so-called Premier League that helped engineer the outcome of the ANC's 54th National Conference. At the conference, held in December 2017, Mabuza was elected Deputy President of the ANC, serving under Cyril Ramaphosa. When Ramaphosa ascended to the national presidency after Zuma's resignation in February 2018, he appointed Mabuza to succeed him as national Deputy President.

== Early life and career ==
David Dabede Mabuza was born on 25 August 1960 at Phola near Hazyview in what became Mpumalanga province. His parents were farmers. He was the sixth of 12 children - eight girls and four boys. He matriculated at Khumbula High School, also in Mpumalanga. He earned a teaching diploma, specialising in mathematics education, from the Mgwenya College of Education in 1985; he was also secretary of the Black Consciousness-aligned Azania Student Organisation (AZASO) from 1984 to 1985. While studying at the University of South Africa for his Bachelor of Arts in psychology, which he earned in 1989, he began work as a schoolteacher. He taught at KaNgwane Department of Education from 1986 to 1988 and was Principal of Lungisani Secondary School, also in Mpumalanga, from 1989 to 1993.

He also continued his political engagements: he was chairperson of the National Education Union of South Africa from 1986 to 1988, treasurer of Foundation for Education with Production from 1986 to 1990, and a co-ordinator of the National Education Crisis Committee from 1987 to 1989. According to journalist Ferial Haffajee, Mathews Phosa recruited Mabuza into the United Democratic Front in 1986. From 1988 to 1991, in the penultimate phase of apartheid, he chaired the South African Democratic Teachers Union, an affiliate of the influential Congress of South African Trade Unions.

== Rise to the Deputy Presidency ==
=== Mpumalanga Executive Council: 1994 ===
After South Africa's first democratic elections in 1994, Mathews Phosa, the inaugural Premier of Mpumalanga, appointed Mabuza his Member of the Executive Council (MEC) for Education in the provincial government of Mpumalanga. Mabuza served in that position until 1998, when Phosa fired him after a scandal in which it emerged that the province's 1998 matric results had been fraudulently inflated by twenty percentage points. Pursuant to the 1999 general election, Mabuza was elected to the Mpumalanga provincial legislature and was reappointed to the provincial executive under Premier Ndaweni Mahlangu, serving as MEC for Housing between 1999 and 2001. In 2001, he left his provincial positions to serve a three-year stint in the national Parliament; he returned to the Mpumalanga legislature from 2004 to 2007. During this period, he became known to the province's civil servants as "the Hurricane", "for his sporadic ireful outbursts when things go wrong".

Over the same period, Mabuza ascended through the provincial ranks of his political party, the African National Congress (ANC). He was Chairperson of the Nelspruit regional branch of the ANC from 1994 to 1998 and a member of the ANC Provincial Executive Committee in Mpumalanga from 1998 to 2006; he became provincial Deputy Chairperson of the ANC in Mpumalanga in 1999 and again in 2005, though in the interim he lost a 2002 election for the position of provincial Secretary. The Mail & Guardian said that he used his time in the national Parliament to build national political networks in the ANC. He also reportedly ingratiated himself with two successive provincial chairpersons – Mahlangu and his successor Thabang Makwetla – by campaigning for them and positioning himself as their deputy, while planning as early as 2005 to run for the provincial chair himself in 2008.

=== ANC National Executive: 2007 ===
Ahead of the ANC's so-called Polokwane conference in December 2007, Mabuza supported Jacob Zuma's successful campaign to replace incumbent Thabo Mbeki as President of the ANC. At the conference, Mabuza himself was elected for the first time to the ANC's National Executive Committee, the top executive organ of the party.

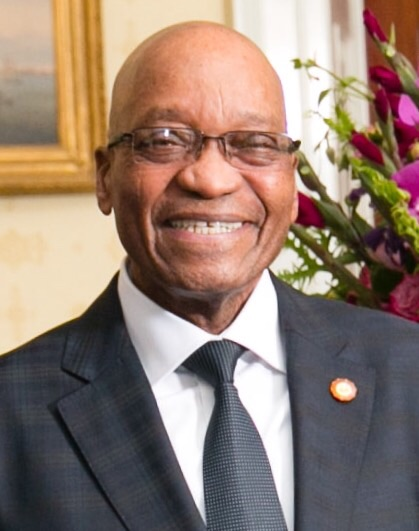
Mabuza rose to national prominence as a supporter of Jacob Zuma.

After the Polokwane conference, he returned to the provincial executive once more: he was MEC for Road and Transport from 2007 to 2008, Leader of Government Business in the provincial legislature in 2007, and MEC for Agriculture and Land Administration from 2008 to 2009.

=== ANC Provincial Chairperson: 2008 ===
In August 2008, he was elected provincial ANC Chairperson in Mpumalanga, beating Lassy Chiwayo with 388 votes to Chiwayo's 305. He and an informal slate of allies, who were also elected to the party's provincial executive, ran an "Mpumalanga First" campaign that was described as populist and xenophobic insofar as it entailed castigating Mabuza's predecessors for giving government jobs to people from outside the province, especially from urban Gauteng. The campaign was supported by local branches of the ANC Youth League, South African National Civics Organisation, and Umkhonto weSizwe Military Veterans' Association. Mabuza's victory was also linked in some analyses to his support for Zuma: his predecessor, Makwetla, was one of several pro-Mbeki provincial chairs who were replaced with pro-Zuma figures during that period. Others, however, thought the Zuma–Mbeki rivalry was irrelevant in Mpumalanga.

=== Mpumalanga Premier: 2009 ===
As provincial Chairperson, Mabuza became the ANC's presumptive candidate for Premier in the 2009 general election. On 6 May 2009, after the ANC won the election, the ANC caucus in the provincial legislature elected him Premier of Mpumalanga. For much of the next decade, Mabuza held both positions concurrently: he remained Premier until February 2018, and he chaired the ANC in the province until 2017, winning re-election in 2012 despite an attempt to unseat him. The Business Day said in 2018 that he had "run Mpumalanga with an iron fist". Among other things, he centralised decision-making power in his office through the so-called Rapid Implementation Unit. He was also well known for his initiative to construct a handful of large boarding schools in the province's rural areas.

==== Premier League ====
Mabuza maintained his support for Zuma, who had been elected as President of South Africa in 2009; he endorsed Zuma for re-election to the ANC presidency ahead of the party's 53rd National Conference, saying, "Hands off our president". At that conference, held in December 2012, Zuma was re-elected but Mabuza himself did not secure direct re-election to the ANC National Executive Committee.

In the mid-2010s, Mabuza launched a successful campaign to expand the ANC's membership in Mpumalanga. Between 2012 and 2017, Mpumalanga, one of South Africa's smaller provinces, jumped from being the ANC's fourth-largest region to being its second-largest (behind KwaZulu-Natal). This meant that the province would be allocated more voting delegates at the ANC's future National Conferences, and would therefore have more influence over leadership selection and policy determination in the party. According to journalist, Norimitsu Onishi, Mabuza "attracted legions of new A.N.C. members with government contracts, cash handouts and even KFC meals", but some of his opponents claimed that the Mpumalanga leadership had artificially inflated its membership figures.

Mabuza shared both tactics – his outspoken support for Zuma and his drive to increase provincial ANC membership – with two other provincial ANC leaders, Supra Mahumapelo of the North West and Ace Magashule of the Free State. The informal alliance between Mabuza, Mahumapelo, and Magashule – although they denied it existed – led journalists to begin calling them the "Premier League", because all three were the Premiers of their respective provinces.

==== Alleged poisoning ====
In September 2015, Mabuza collapsed and fell ill. Although it was initially reportedly that he was suffering from severe fatigue or a stroke, he told City Press that he had been poisoned. Vusi Shongwe acted as Premier while Mabuza took two months' leave to recover from his illness. Upon his return, he gave himself the nickname "The Cat" for his ability to survive attacks by his opponents.

It later emerged that Mabuza had travelled to a state hospital in Moscow in October 2015 to receive specialised medical treatment, and that he had travelled there on a private jet owned by the Gupta family, which at that time was alleged to be involved in state capture under the Zuma administration. A spokesman explained, "The premier was gravely ill and was not in a position to easily walk or carry himself on to a national airline". According to Mabuza, the use of the Guptas' jet had been offered to him by Duduzane Zuma, President Zuma's son, who was a business associate of the Guptas. He said that he did not have any other relationship with the family and that the favour would not create a conflict of interest.

=== ANC Deputy Presidency: 2017 ===
Ahead of the 54th National Conference of the ANC, which would elect Zuma's successor to the ANC presidency, Mabuza and the other members of the Premier League were viewed as the primary "kingmakers", both because of the large number of voting delegates allocated to their provinces and because of their apparent influence over the votes of the ANC Women's League and Youth League. Mabuza, with the second-largest number of delegates, was viewed as particularly powerful, especially as he declined to endorse whole-heartedly either of the two frontrunners, Nkosazana Dlamini-Zuma and Cyril Ramaphosa. Initially, Mabuza was assumed to support Dlamini-Zuma, who had the endorsement of President Zuma, her ex-husband. This was especially plausible because the other Premier League members were aligned to her and because her supporters seemed to view Mabuza as her informal running mate. However, his commitment to the Dlamini-Zuma campaign became less certain as the conference approached, and Mabuza "play[ed] both sides".

Instead, he launched what he referred to as a campaign for "unity" in the ANC: indeed, he reportedly encouraged ANC members in Mpumalanga not to nominate presidential candidates but instead to vote for "unity"; about a third of them apparently spoiled their ballots by writing the word "unity" across them. The unity campaign gave Mabuza leverage with both frontrunners. In the week of the conference, he was described as the conference's "wild card" and "most powerful man", with the most power to sway the ultimate outcome. He had also received strong support for his candidacy for the deputy presidency and the Business Day expected him to be elected as ANC Deputy President regardless of which side prevailed in the presidential race.

When the conference began, on 18 December, it was announced that Ramaphosa had won the presidency and Mabuza the deputy presidency. He had beaten Lindiwe Sisulu, Ramaphosa's running mate, by 2,538 votes to Sisulu's 2,159. In fact, of all the so-called Top Six leaders elected, Mabuza had won both the most branch nominations and the most votes.

In the aftermath, the ANC Women's League, which had strongly supported Dlamini-Zuma, said that Mabuza had "outsmarted" and betrayed them. At the conference, Mabuza had apparently promised the Dlamini-Zuma camp that he would encourage the delegates from his province to vote for her. However, sources told the Sunday Times that Mabuza had not instructed his supporters to vote for any particular candidate, but rather had told them – moments before the vote – to follow their conscience. A spokesman for the Women's League said that Mabuza and Ace Magashule "did not pull the candidate up. They used it [Dlamini-Zuma's campaign] as a ladder for themselves... It’s our demonstration to you to say this is how patriarchy is rearing its ugly head". In defence, Mabuza's allies said that he had not promised his support to either candidate: "The only commitment we have is to unity".

Several newspapers reported that Mabuza had coordinated with Paul Mashatile on his unity campaign, including by lobbying (successfully) for Mashatile's election as Treasurer-General.

Despite his decisive role at the 54th National Conference, journalist Stephen Grootes argued that Mabuza's position in the ANC remained weak in the longer term, due to his lack of a national profile:

The real source of Mabuza’s power at Nasrec [the conference venue] was not that he has overwhelming support from branches on the ground, or that he has a national following in the party – it was that the race between Ramaphosa and Nkosazana Dlamini Zuma was so close. He held the deciding delegates, which made him the kingmaker. That has given him, in some eyes, the perception of having immense power. But the deciding factor in this race was all that he had. If the two main factions had not been so close, his delegates would not have mattered. Translating what was a deciding, but small, factor into ultimate victory for the leadership is by no means guaranteed.

== Deputy Presidency ==
On 26 February 2018, he was appointed Deputy President of South Africa by Ramaphosa, who had replaced Zuma following his resignation. Mabuza was sworn in the following day and was also sworn in as a Member of the National Assembly in order to take up the position. On 20 March, Mabuza gave his maiden speech in Parliament and for the first time responded to questions from other Members of Parliament. On 21 March, he addressed the national Human Rights Day commemoration in Sharpeville while Ramaphosa was abroad.

When Ramaphosa was re-elected to a full term as President after the 2019 general election, Mabuza was re-appointed as Deputy President. On that occasion, his swearing in was delayed as he sought to address allegations – made in a report of the ANC's internal Integrity Commission – that he was one of a list of ANC leaders who had brought the ANC into disrepute. Among other responsibilities, Mabuza was Leader of Government Business in Parliament, the head of the South African National AIDS Council, the head of the National Human Resource Development Council, and the patron of the Moral Regeneration Movement. He also chairs two cabinet subcommittees, one on governance and state capacity and one on justice and security. The policy priorities delegated to him by President Ramaphosa include land reform, anti-poverty initiatives, and rural and township economic empowerment.

=== Medical leave: 2021 ===
In 2021, Mabuza took medical leave to receive further medical treatment in Russia, where he remained for more than a month before his return in August. He did not reveal the purpose of the treatment but media speculated that it was related to his alleged poisoning in 2015; when the opposition Democratic Alliance attempted to ask him in the National Assembly whether he had been poisoned, the question was disallowed by Nosiviwe Mapisa-Nqakula, the Speaker. When questioned further in 2022, Mabuza said that there was "nothing sinister" about the trip, that its purpose had been medical rather than political, and that it had had no bearing on government policy on energy contracts or the Russian invasion of Ukraine.

=== Motorcade accidents: 2022 ===
Mabuza's motorcade was in two separate car accidents in 2022. In the first incident, on 27 July, a collision on the N1 in Midrand hospitalised two of his protection officers with minor injuries, but Mabuza was not in any of the vehicles. On 20 November, as the motorcade transported Mabuza from Mpumalanga to the O. R. Tambo International Airport, one of the vehicles overturned when a tyre burst; one protection officer was killed and two were hospitalised, but the car carrying Mabuza was not affected.

=== Presidential bid: 2022 ===
Ahead of the ANC's 55th National Conference in December 2022, at which Ramaphosa was re-elected as ANC President, Mabuza campaigned for his own election to the ANC presidency. However, the campaign did not receive adequate support for Mabuza to be included on the ballot paper for either the presidency or the deputy presidency positions. On the floor of the conference, he was nominated to stand for re-election as ANC Deputy President but declined the nomination. He was succeeded by Paul Mashatile.

=== Resignation and succession: 2023 ===
After being succeeded by Mashatile as deputy president of the ANC, it was reported on 27 January 2023 that Mabuza had offered to resign as deputy president of the country to make way for Mashatile to take up the position. Mabuza confirmed at his brother's funeral on 4 February that he had informed Ramaphosa of his decision to step down. Ramaphosa asked Mabuza to remain in the position until the transition processes had been concluded.

On 1 March 2023, it was revealed that Mabuza had resigned as a Member of Parliament the previous day, ending his tenure as deputy president of South Africa.

== Other controversies ==
=== Farmhouse burglary ===
In December 2009, an amount of cash was stolen from Mabuza's farmhouse in Mpumalanga. The story attracted attention in part because it was never clearly established how much money was stolen. The Sunday Times heard from several police sources that R14 million was stolen, but that only R4 million had been reported missing "because it would have raised eyebrows that the premier kept such a large amount of money at a residential property". In November 2010, a police constable confirmed that a case had been opened at the Barberton police station regarding R4 million; it had been referred to the organised crime unit because it was a high-profile case. However, the spokesperson of that unit continued to maintain that only R1,200 was reported stolen. Africa Report later linked the story to rumours that, during the period in which the theft had taken place, several Mpumalanga politicians had received kickbacks related to the construction of the Mbombela Stadium ahead of the 2010 Soccer World Cup.

=== Lawsuit against Mathews Phosa ===
In 2014, Mabuza unsuccessfully sued his former boss, Mathews Phosa, for defamation. The suit concerned a document entitled Classified: Top Secret! Reports of a Police Agent which Mabuza said Phosa had published and circulated in the ANC. Mabuza said that the document made various incorrect and defamatory claims, including that Mabuza was a spy for the apartheid police from 1985 to 1993. Phosa said that he had seen the document and had forwarded it to ANC Deputy Secretary General Jessie Duarte, but denied involvement in its publication. The Pretoria High Court dismissed Mabuza's case in 2017.

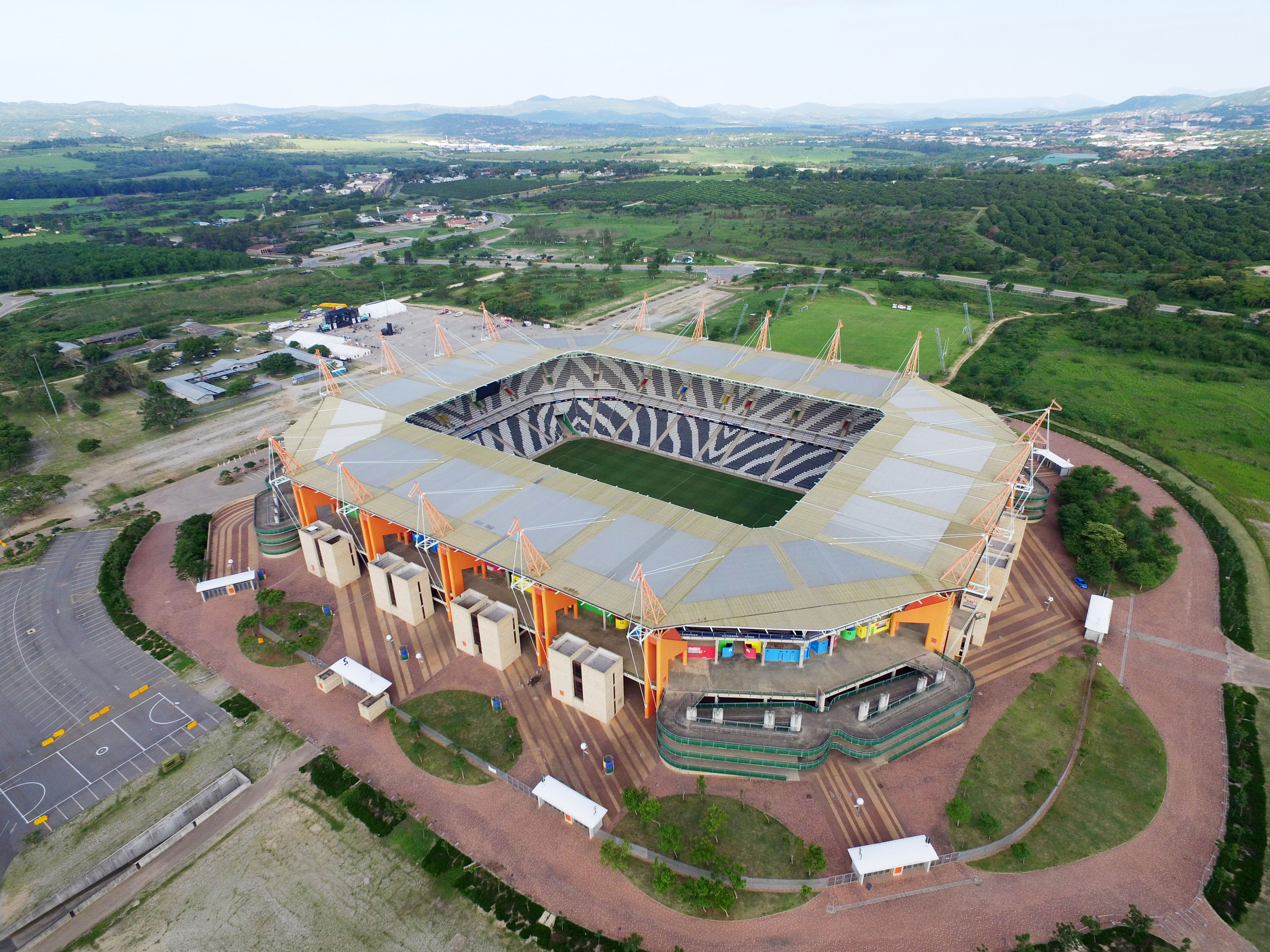
While Mabuza was Premier, there was a series of scandals about an alleged violent cover-up of tender corruption related to the construction of Mbombela Stadium.

=== Alleged corruption ===
Mabuza was accused of involvement in political corruption and tender fraud. In August 2018, in a lengthy exposé, the New York Times reported that while Premier Mabuza had built a network of political patronage in Mpumalanga by artificially inflating, and carefully distributing, contracts to build schools in the province – a strategy facilitated by his Rapid Implementation Unit – and thereby strengthened his political base at the expense of the public service delivery. Mabuza also had a long-running dispute with Fred Daniel, the owner and developer of a Mpumalanga nature reserve, who claimed that Mabuza was implicated in fraudulent land scams in the province while MEC. He said that the various allegations against him are part of a smear campaign by his opponents.

=== Alleged political violence ===
Mabuza was rumoured to have been involved in political violence in Mpumalanga. This includes persistent rumours, particularly among his local political opponents, that, while Premier, Mabuza was involved in conspiracies which led to political killings in the province. Mabuza was linked to the assassination of Sammy Mpatlanyane, a government official who was shot in 2010 after he refused to sign off on controversial tenders. Most prominently, however, he was frequently linked to the assassination of Jimmy Mohlala, who was shot dead on 4 January 2009. Mohlala was the Speaker of Mbombela Municipality and had launched a "crusade" against tender corruption related to the construction of the Mbombela Stadium; his murder was viewed as an attempt to cover up the corruption.

Controversial activist James Nkambule, of the Congress of the People, claimed publicly that Mabuza was responsible; he also accused Mabuza of using state resources to intimidate him, and reported him to the police for intimidation over a threatening SMS he claimed Mabuza had sent him. Nkambule claimed to have met a Mozambican man named 'Josh' said he had been hired to murder Mohlala and others, and he was lobbying for the man's entrance into witness protection when he was poisoned in October 2010. Several years later, Mabuza's former butler, Jan Venter, alleged that Mabuza had once "let slip" to him that he was behind the assassinations of "Jimmy and James", which Venter understood as a reference to Mohlala and Nkambule; Venter was put in witness protection. In addition, Mzilikazi wa Afrika, a Sunday Times journalist who reported extensively on the killings and the claims of the alleged hitman, was arrested in August 2010 on a forgery charge laid by Mabuza, later dropped. He claimed that the charge was politically motivated and an attempt to "harass and intimidate me". In 2014, two men from Mbombela claimed that they had been members of a "dirty tricks" task team formed by Mabuza to suppress allegations that he was involved in political killings; they had been offered R3 million and jobs in the government and had been instructed to steal documents from Nkabule.

Mabuza consistently denied involvement in the assassinations, and, as of 2022, the allegations had never been prosecuted or proven. In 2016, he told a journalist, "One day, people will get clarity when they lay hands on privileged information I have about the political murders... This individual bought people to kill people and allege that I killed them. They wanted me arrested... to be out of the way."

In 2017, ahead of the ANC's 54th National Conference, Mathews Phosa told eNCA that Mabuza had a "private army" in Mpumalanga. He said the "private army" carried weapons, disrupted ANC meetings, and otherwise sought to intimidate local ANC members who did not support Mabuza's political agenda. He made the allegation in connection with a video that had surfaced of gunmen firing shots recklessly at a gathering, apparently in Mpumalanga; Phosa said that the men were connected to Mabuza. Mabuza and the provincial ANC denied Phosa's allegation. At the time, Phosa was instituting a court challenge against the Mpumalanga ANC, believing that there had been improper conduct in the process by which it had nominated candidates for election at the 54th National Conference.

== Philanthropy ==
In 2014, Mabuza established the DD Mabuza Foundation. Its priorities are education and the social upliftment of vulnerable groups such as children, the elderly, and persons with disabilities.

== Personal life and death ==
Mabuza was married to Nonhlanhla Patience Mnisi, a real estate agent at Pam Golding. According to the Independent Online, he was formerly married to Ruthi Funi Silinda; Silinda is referred to elsewhere as his customary ex-wife or former fiancée, and they had a daughter, Tamara, together.

Mabuza died after a prolonged illness in Sandton, on 3 July 2025, at the age of 64.

Political offices
Preceded by Cyril Ramaphosa	Deputy President of South Africa; 2018–2023	Succeeded by Paul Mashatile
Preceded by Cyril Ramaphosa	Deputy President of the African National Congress; 2017–2022	Succeeded by Paul Mashatile
