= Lassy Chiwayo =

South African politician and businessman (born 1966)

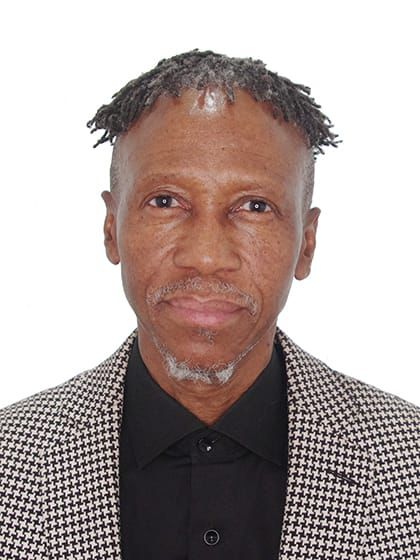
- Chiwayo in 2024

Mayor of Mbombela
- In office June 2008 – May 2011
- Succeeded by: Cathy Dlamini

Personal details
- Born: Lekota Lazarus Chiwayo; 11 October 1966 (age 59)
- Citizenship: South Africa
- Party: African National Congress
- Children: 3

Lekota Lazarus "Lassy" Chiwayo (born 11 October 1966) is a South African politician, diplomat, and businessman from Mpumalanga. He was Mayor of Mbombela from 2008 until 2011, when he joined the diplomatic service.

Chiwayo rose to prominence in the 1980s as an anti-apartheid activist and young inmate of Robben Island. After the end of apartheid in 1994, he served in both houses of Parliament and in the Mpumalanga Executive Council under Premier Mathews Phosa. He retreated to a full-time career in business until June 2008, when he returned to front-line politics to enter the mayoral office. His tenure in the position coincided with Mbombela's preparations to serve as a host city in the 2010 FIFA World Cup, as well as with the concomitant political turmoil over alleged corruption in related contracts. During this period, Chiwayo was a key rival and critic of Mpumalanga Premier David Mabuza.

Chiwayo left the mayoral office after the May 2011 local elections and was subsequently appointed as South African consul-general to Shanghai, China. He was recalled from that position in early 2013.

== Early life and activism ==
Born on 11 October 1966, Chiwayo was active in the anti-apartheid movement in his youth. In 1988, he was imprisoned on Robben Island for his activism. He later said that his early treatment by prison officials – including torture and blackmail following his father's death – had led him to adopt "very serious antagonistic attitudes against whites", but that his attitudes were challenged and "transformed" by the ANC leadership on Robben Island. He did not complete his prison sentence, because he was among the political prisoners released after the apartheid government signed the Pretoria Minute in August 1990.

== Legislative career ==
=== Mpumalanga Provincial Legislature ===
In South Africa's first post-apartheid elections in 1994, Chiwayo, still under the age of 30, was elected to an ANC seat in the Senate, the upper house of the South African Parliament, where he represented the Eastern Transvaal constituency. During the legislative term, he resigned from his seat to join the Mpumalanga Provincial Legislature, where he served in Premier Mathews Phosa's government as Member of the Executive Council (MEC) for Sport and Recreation, and later, from late 1998, as MEC for Finance. During the same period, Chiwayo was active in the ANC Youth League, and in 1998 he launched an unsuccessful bid to oust Malusi Gigaba from the league's presidency.

In the 1999 general election, Chiwayo was re-elected for a full term in the Mpumalanga Provincial Legislature; he was ranked second on the ANC's party list, with only Ndaweni Mahlangu ahead of him. Mahlangu was elected as Premier of Mpumalanga and did not reappoint Chiwayo to his Executive Council. Instead, Chiwayo served as majority chief whip in the legislature. In the factional divides of the Mpumalanga ANC of that era, Chiwayo was viewed as an opponent of Mahlangu and a supporter of Mahlangu's predecessor, Mathews Phosa.

=== National Assembly ===
In June 2001, in what was described by the press as a "purge" by Mahlangu, Chiwayo and a handful of other provincial representatives were transferred from the provincial legislature to the National Assembly. He was sworn in to the National Assembly on 3 July 2001, filling the casual vacancy that had arisen after Cengi Mahlalela's death; he was succeeded as provincial chief whip by Jabu Mahlangu. However, Chiwayo did not complete the legislative term in his new seat; he retired from active politics to pursue a career in business. During this period, his businesses were involved in the Gautrain project.

== Mayor of Mbombela ==
In early June 2008, Chiwayo returned to front-line politics when he was elected as mayor of Mpumalanga's Mbombela Local Municipality. His appointment was part of a campaign by the ANC to stabilise the municipal administration, which had been placed under curatorship in February following a series of corruption scandals related to preparations for the 2010 FIFA World Cup. Upon taking office, Chiwayo announced that he would sequester his business interests in a blind trust and donate the entirety of his mayoral salary to charity.

=== Contest with David Mabuza ===
By the time he entered the mayoral office, Chiwayo had emerged as a likely contender to succeed Thabang Makwetla as provincial chairperson of the ANC's Mpumalanga branch. His campaign was supported by Boy Nobunga, Jacques Modipane, and other prominent provincial politicians, but his opponent, David Mabuza, ran on a populist "Mpumalanga First" campaign platform and attacked Chiwayo for his perceived links to urban Gauteng province. When the ANC's provincial elective conference was held in Nelspruit in August 2008, Chiwayo lost to Mabuza, receiving 305 votes to Mabuza's 388.

In future years, Chiwayo remained a prominent critic and rival of Mabuza, who became provincial premier in 2009 and whom Chiwayo later described as someone who "leads the dark forces and works in the shadows". Indeed, on some accounts, over the next three years he became "the face of the anti-Mabuza campaign" in the province.

=== Mbombela Stadium ===
Much of Chiwayo's mayoral term was dominated by scandals relating to alleged corruption in procurement for the 2010 FIFA World Cup, particularly in the contracts for the construction of the Mbombela Stadium. In a frank interview in mid-2010, Chiwayo told the Mail & Guardian that the selection of Mbombela as a World Cup host city had intensified the "worst alien tendencies within the ANC", saying that, "forces within the party in the province – representing business interests rather than those of the people who voted for the ANC – were working to consolidate their position to make money from the tournament from very early on".

In January 2009, the speaker of the Mbombela council, Jimmy Mohlala, was shot dead in a presumed political assassination. In early 2010, several newspapers reported that Chiwayo himself appeared on at least one leaked hit list that was circulating in the province. Chiwayo said that he was certain that Mohlala had been murdered for his campaign to uncover corruption in the Mbombela Stadium contracts, and he later said that he held Mabuza "directly or indirectly responsible".

He and Mabuza reportedly were at odds over what Chiwayo perceived as Mabuza's lack of will to address corruption and political violence in the province. In March 2011, he reportedly had a physical scuffle with Mabuza at a meeting at the ANC's provincial headquarters. Chiwayo said that he had called the meeting in order to address his concerns:

Someone [Mabuza] had to be told where to get off... I was direct with him about his role in the province – the corruption and tenderpreneur Godfathers he has created. I also told him he had set me up by approaching me to leave my business ventures in Johannesburg and come here to be mayor so he could destroy me.

During the meeting, Chiwayo reportedly launched a "tirade", growing increasingly upset until he charged at Mabuza physically, forcing ANC provincial secretary Charles Makola to intervene.

For these and other reasons, Chiwayo later said that he had "suffered a lot of stress" in Mbombela. A fortnight after his scuffle with Mabuza, he said that he had checked himself into a mental health clinic for treatment of stress. Indeed, according to News24, it was the third time since becoming mayor that Chiwayo had been hospitalised for stress; he had also reportedly fortified his private security arrangements, fearing that he would be assassinated.

=== Succession ===
In January 2011, in the run-up to the 2011 local elections, Chiwayo had announced that he had asked the ANC to allow him resign from the mayoral office in order to return to his business career. After the elections, he was succeeded as mayor by Cathy Dlamini.

== Diplomatic career ==
In September 2011, the Mail & Guardian reported that Chiwayo had been designated to take office as South African consul-general in Shanghai, China. He attended diplomatic training in Pretoria until January 2012, when he was posted abroad; News24 reported that ANC officials Mathews Phosa and Kgalema Motlanthe had engineered the appointment.

While Chiwayo was in Shanghai, in February 2013, his Porsche and several other items were damaged in a fire at his empty home in Mbombela. Chiwayo said that he believed the attack was politically motivated and had been planned by rivals who wanted to "send him a message"; he said that the house had been attacked on prior occasions and that he had received "phone call threats telling me to get out of Mpumalanga". He implied that he had accepted the diplomatic posting precisely in order to evade such threats.

In March 2013, the Department of International Relations and Cooperation announced that Chiwayo had been recalled to South Africa to receive medical treatment. The Sunday World reported that he had been recalled for having embarrassed the country, both by walking naked around his Shanghai neighbourhood and by assaulting the South African Ambassador to China, Bheki Langa, at an event in Beijing. Chiwayo dismissed the reports as false.
