= South African criminal law =

Law relating to crime

South African criminal law is the body of national law relating to crime in South Africa. In the definition of Van der Walt et al., a crime is "conduct which common or statute law prohibits and expressly or impliedly subjects to punishment remissible by the state alone and which the offender cannot avoid by his own act once he has been convicted." Crime involves the infliction of harm against society. The function or object of criminal law is to provide a social mechanism with which to coerce members of society to abstain from conduct that is harmful to the interests of society.

In South Africa, as in most adversarial legal systems, the standard of evidence required to validate a criminal conviction is proof beyond a reasonable doubt. The sources of South African criminal law are to be found in the common law, in case law and in legislation.

Criminal law (which is to be distinguished from its civil counterpart) forms part of the public law of South Africa, as well as of the substantive law (as opposed to the procedural). The study of "criminal law" generally focuses on the substantive law: namely, the principles of law according to which criminal liability (guilt or innocence) is determined, whereas the law of criminal procedure, together with the law of evidence, generally focuses on the procedures used to decide criminal liability and theories of punishment. A study of the substantive criminal law may be divided into two broad sections:

1. an examination of the general principles of liability (applicable to crimes generally); and
2. an examination of the definitions and particular requirements of the various individual crimes or "specific offences."

A distinction must be drawn also between national and international criminal law. The term "criminal law" usually refers to internal or domestic or national criminal law, which is governed by the legal system of the country concerned. The term "international criminal law", denoting a more recent branch of the law, is viewed by some as a branch of public international law, while others contend that it is, "at least in the material sense (and to a growing extent also in the institutional and procedural sense), a discipline in its own right."

== Punishment ==
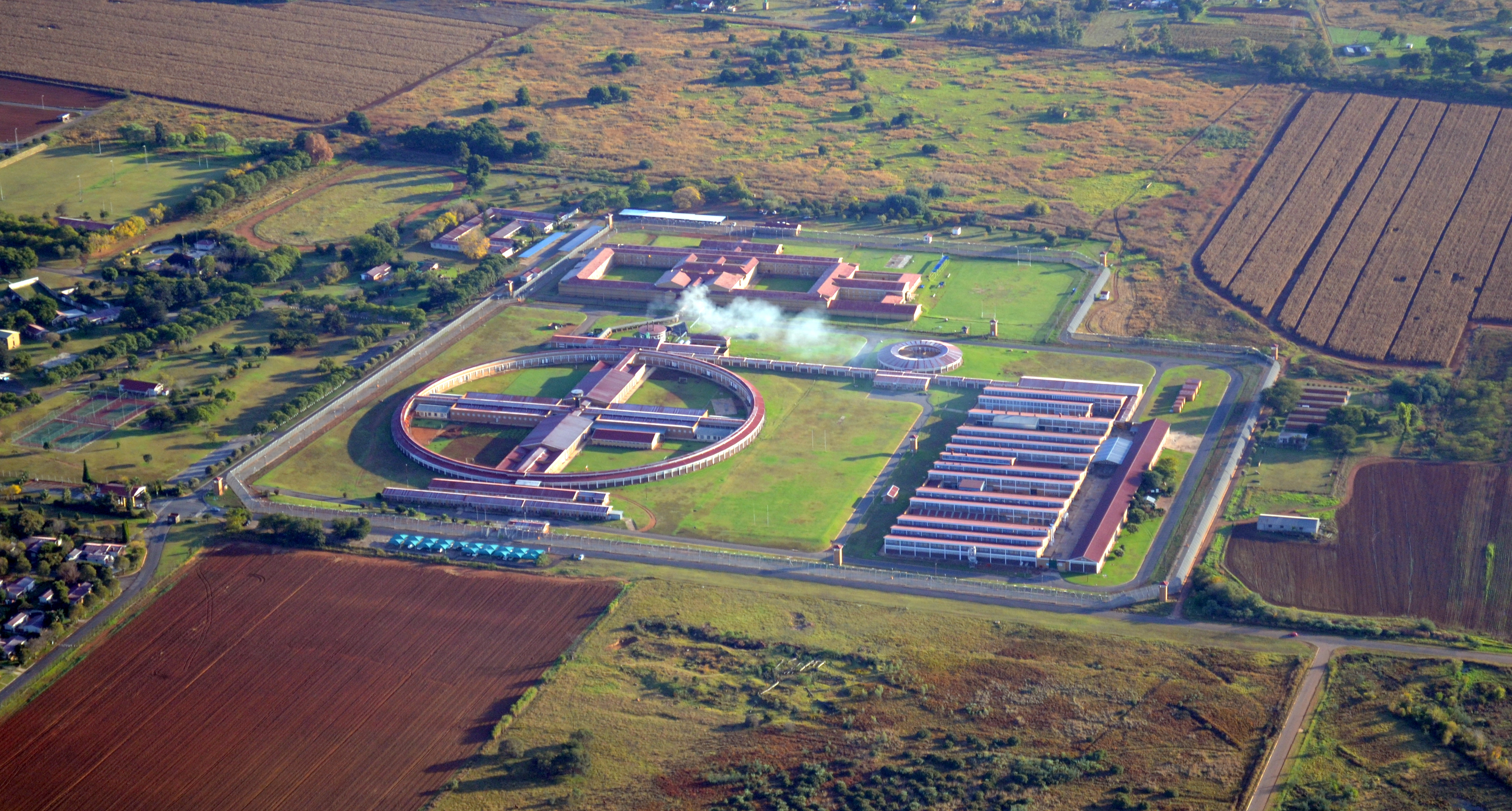
The Zonderwater Prison, Cullinan, Gauteng

The criminal justice system in South Africa is aimed at law enforcement, the prosecution of offenders and the punishment of the convicted. It is that part or sub-system of the national legal system which determines the circumstances and the procedures according to which people and legal entities may be punished by the State for criminal conduct.

Punishment is the authoritative infliction by the State of suffering for a criminal offence. The "essential purpose of criminal law is to provide a mechanism for punishing the offender." There are numerous theories of punishment, whose two main purposes are

1. to justify the punishment imposed; and
2. to define the type and scope of different punishments.

The various theories of punishment seek to answer the question: "Why does the criminal justice system punish individuals? In other words, what is the purpose of punishment?"

In criminal law, a number of theories of punishment have been identified. They are normally grouped or classified under three broad headings:

1. retributive or absolute theories of punishment, which justify punishment on the basis that it is deserved;
2. utilitarian or relative theories of punishment, which justify punishment on the basis that it is socially beneficial; and
3. combination or unitary theories of punishment, which fuse in various measures the other two categories.

=== Retributive theories ===
Retributive or absolute theories of punishment, "perhaps the best known with ancient roots," aim to restore the legal balance upset by the crime; they are also known as "just desert." Ancient notions of justice, including the idea of "an eye for an eye" (the ancient lex talionis), "clearly informed this theory of punishment."

In modern criminal law, "one should be careful not to confuse retribution with vengeance." The focus now is not on vengeance, private or otherwise; it is, rather, "a more nuanced and enlightened attempt to restore the balance that was disturbed by the criminal conduct." It has been argued, accordingly, that it would be more appropriate to refer to this approach as "restorative justice." An important point or premise to keep in mind, when considering the retributive theory of punishment, is the fundamental notion of criminal law that individuals are personally responsible for their own wrongdoing. This is the idea of self-determinism or free will.

Retributive theories generally take proportionality into account and consider the perpetrator's record of previous wrongdoing. They do not seek to justify punishment with reference to some future benefit which it may achieve; it is incorrect, in fact, to describe retribution as a "purpose of punishment." Retribution, according to this theory, is the essential characteristic of punishment.

=== Utilitarian theories ===
There are three types of utilitarian or relative theories of punishment:

1. prevention;
2. deterrence; and
3. reformation.

The first two, deterrence and prevention, are connected, in that the goal of deterrence is to prevent recidivism or repeat offending.

==== Preventive ====
According to the preventive theory of punishment, the purpose of punishment is the prevention of crime. This theory can overlap with its deterrent and reformative counterparts, since both deterrence and reformation may be seen merely as methods of preventing crime. Among the "less drastic examples of the preventive approach" are "(preventive) imprisonment, and the forfeiture of a driver's license."

On the other hand, there are other forms of punishment (such as capital punishment and life imprisonment, and the castration of sexual offenders) which are in line with the preventive purpose, but which do not necessarily serve also the aims of reformation and deterrence. These forms are "the most extreme manifestation" of the preventive theory: "The criminal offender is permanently incapacitated and can no longer pose a risk to society." Capital punishment "can also be seen as the ultimate form of retribution."

==== Deterrent ====
Of all the relative theories, the theory that punishment should serve as a deterrent "is arguably the most popular." There is an important distinction to be made between

- individual deterrence, which is aimed at the deterrence of a certain individual from the commission of further crimes, by individualising the punishment; and
- general deterrence, "aimed at a wider audience," which seeks to deter the entire community, or at least a significant portion, from committing the type of crime in question.

Individual deterrence may be said to be aimed primarily at the prevention of recidivism, although the rate of recidivism in South Africa is around ninety per cent, which would seem to suggest that it is not meeting with success.

If the punishment meted out to the individual offender is "disproportionately harsh" in its service as a warning to the rest of society, "the punishment can no longer be described as a 'just desert' (in terms of the retributive theory) and, in the South African context, there might also be a constitutional objection." Accordingly, "the general deterrent approach to punishment is [...] less attractive (at least not as attractive as the retributive theory, which holds out the possibility of better proportionality)."

==== Reformative ====
The third of the utilitarian or relative theories of punishment is the reformative theory, which is encapsulated by the judgment in S v Shilubane, where the court found "abundant empirical evidence"—it cited none, though—that retributive justice had "failed to stem the ever-increasing wave of crime" in South Africa. The courts, it decided, must therefore "seriously consider" alternative sentences, like community service, as viable alternatives to direct imprisonment. A reformatory approach, the court found, would "benefit our society immensely by excluding the possibility of warped sentences being imposed routinely on people who do not deserve them."

"This approach," write Kemp et al., "is, on the face of it, quite attractive, since it purports to be sophisticated and aimed not at retribution, but at reform (which connotes positive impressions of the betterment of individuals and society)." There are, however, "many practical and theoretical objections." They all come down, in essence, to the contention that reformation "does not actually work in practice–the criminal justice system is simply not good at 'reforming' people." Furthermore, "there is also a theoretical/moral objection: if the focus is only on the individual offender that needs to be reformed, then there is no justice in terms of the victims or the broader society. That leaves the very real impression or perception that 'justice was not served.'"

=== Combination theories ===
Because "the various theories of punishment all contain positive and negative aspects," an "obvious approach should therefore be a well-balanced combination of the elements that are best suitable in terms of the interests of society, the individual offender and the nature of the crime." In criminal law, this is known as "the combination theory of punishment."

The most-cited and -generally accepted of the combination theories is that laid out in S v Zinn, where Rumpff JA laid out a basic triad of sentencing considerations:

1. the crime;
2. the offender; and
3. the interests of society.

This judgment has been taken as "confirming the combination theory as the best approach" in South African law.

In S v Makwanyane, which eliminated capital punishment in South Africa, Chaskalson P provided a clearer combination of the other theories of punishment, laying emphasis on deterrence, prevention and retribution. S v Rabie, Although recognised as a legitimate object of punishment, retribution should not, according to the court, be given undue weight, given South Africa's human rights ethos and the role to be played by ubuntu in society; the primary object of punishment should be prevention and rehabilitation, not revenge. The court held that "punishment should fit the criminal as well as the crime, be fair to society, and be blended with a measure of mercy according to the circumstances."

The court in S v Salzwedel held that among the aggravating factors to be considered in sentencing was racial motivation in the commission of a serious offence, because racism subverted the fundamental premises of the ethos of human rights which now, after the negotiated settlement, permeated South Africa's processes of judicial interpretation and discretion. The court decided that a substantial term of imprisonment, for a murder committed out of racism, would give expression to the community's legitimate feelings of outrage. It would also send out a strong message that the courts will not tolerate—they will deal severely with—serious crimes perpetrated in consequence of racist and intolerant values inconsistent with the ethos of the Constitution.

In S v Combrink the court held that, given the public ire with sentences which appear to favour a particular group in society, the court must exercise judicial sensitivity in cases which appear to have racial or discriminatory connotations. The public interest against discrimination is not necessarily in discrimination between black and white, but rather between people in general who perceive others, with prejudice, to be different or inferior to them. In order properly to combat hate crimes, decision makers in the criminal justice system should be attuned to the fact that the effects go far beyond the victims, serving to traumatise whole communities and damaging South African society.

== Principle of legality ==
According to the principle of legality, the State may inflict punishment only for contraventions of a designated crime created by a law that, before the contravention, was in force, valid and applicable. It is a corollary of the rule of law: an idea developed, mainly during the 17th and 18th centuries, by such political philosophers as Montesquieu and Beccaria, "in reaction to the harshness and arbitrariness of the political systems of their day." The doctrine of the rule of law holds that people should be governed by and according to law (a body of established and impartial rules), rather than by "the arbitrary whims of those in power," and that everyone, including those in power, should be subject to the law. No-one should be "above the law."

The principle of legality is summed up in the dictum nullum crimen sine lege, "no crime without a law." This principle, "basic to criminal liability in our law," as the court put it in S v Smit, is supplemented by that of nullum crimen sine poena, "no crime without punishment." In R v Zinn, although the court did not make the assumption that, if an enactment is to create a crime, it should provide either expressly or by reference for a punishment, it was thought "improbable that if the lawgiver had intended that the Besluit should create a crime, he would not have taken the precaution of inserting a penalty—more particularly as this is what appears generally to have been done." The court in R v Carto held that "to render any act criminal in our law, there must be some punishment affixed to the commission of the act," and that "where no law exists affixing such punishment there is no crime in law."

Another important principle is nulla poena sine lege: "no punishment without a law." To apply the principle of legality, it is important that the definitions both of common-law and of statutory crimes be reasonably precise and settled. Penal statutes should be strictly construed; the law should be accessible. Finally, there is the dictum nullum crimen, nulla poena sine praevia lege poenali: "laws and punishments do not operate retrospectively."

=== Legality and the Constitution ===
The South African Constitution entrenches the principle of legality. Its preamble states that South Africa is founded on the supremacy of the Constitution and the rule of law. The Bill of Rights, meanwhile, provides that "every accused person has a right to a fair trial, which includes the right:

1. "not to be convicted for an act or omission that was not an offence under either national or international law at the time it was committed or omitted; [and]
2. "to the benefit of the least severe of the prescribed punishments if the prescribed punishment for the offence has been changed between the time that the offence was committed and the time of sentencing."

In terms of the ius certum principle (the principle of certainty), the crime must not, as formulated, be vague or unclear. The subject must understand exactly what is expected of him. The definition of a crime should be reasonably precise and settled, so that people need not live in fear of breaking the law inadvertently. Although the Constitution does not expressly provide that vague or unclear penal provisions may be struck down, it is "quite possible and even probable," according to Snyman, that the first provision above will be interpreted in such a way that vaguely defined statutory crimes may be declared null and void. This "void-for-vagueness" rule may be based either on the right to a fair trial in general or on the principle that, if a criminal norm in legislation is vague and uncertain, it cannot be stated that the act or omission in question actually constituted an offence prior to a court's interpretation of the legislation.

It is also possible to base the operation of the ius certum provision on section 35(3)(a) {{ of the Constitution, which provides that the right to a fair trial includes the right to be informed of the charge with sufficient detail to answer it. In S v Lavhengwa it was held that the right created in section 35(3)(a) implies that the charge itself must be clear and unambiguous. This, according to the court, would only be the case if the nature of the crime were sufficiently clear and unambiguous to comply with the constitutional right to be sufficiently informed of the charge. It was held further that, to comply with the requirement of sufficient clarity, one should bear in mind

1. that absolute clarity is not required, because reasonable clarity is sufficient; and
2. that a court, in deciding whether a provision is clear or vague, should approach the legislation on the basis that it is dealing with reasonable people, not foolish or capricious ones.

It is not only statutory criminal provisions that may, on the ground of vagueness, be declared null and void in terms of the Constitution, but also provisions of the common law that are vague and uncertain. In S v Friedman it was argued on behalf of the accused that the rule in regard to the crime of fraud (that the prejudice need be neither actual nor of a patrimonial nature) was unconstitutional on the ground of vagueness. Although the court rejected the argument, it is noteworthy that nowhere in its judgment did it call into question the principle that rules of common law may be declared null and void on the ground of vagueness.

== Criminal liability ==
Probably the most important principle of criminal liability is captured in the dictum actus non facit reum nisi mens sit rea, or "an act is not unlawful unless there is a guilty mind." To establish criminal liability, the State must prove, beyond a reasonable doubt, that the accused has committed

- voluntary conduct which is unlawful (actus reus); accompanied by
- criminal capacity; and
- fault (mens rea, in the form of intention or negligence).

=== Conduct ===
Although in theory one could begin to study the general principles of criminal liability with any one of these three elements, the usual starting point is to consider the accused's conduct. If the State is unable to prove unlawful conduct on the part of the accused, the accused cannot be criminally liable, and the enquiries into criminal capacity and fault become redundant. Criminal capacity and fault are never determined in isolation; they must be determined in relation to the relevant accused's particular unlawful conduct. For these reasons, a trial court will normally begin its judgment by considering whether the State has proved the actus reus, before going on to consider the other two elements of liability.

Since each crime has its own definition, the actus reus varies according to the crime concerned. There are, however, certain essential requirements which must invariably be met in order to satisfy the unlawful-conduct part of the enquiry. Burchell lists the elements of unlawful conduct as

- conduct;
- causation; and
- unlawfulness.

For Snyman, it is the following:

1. conduct;
2. compliance with the definitional elements;
3. unlawfulness; and then
4. capacity and fault, which go together to establish culpability.

The law violated by the conduct could be common law or statute. Where, however, the conduct with which the accused is charged does not fit the definition of a crime, or where that crime did not exist at the time the conduct occurred, the principle of legality has not been satisfied, and the accused cannot be held liable. He is entitled to object to the charge on the basis that it does not disclose an offence.

The conduct must

- be carried out by a human being;
- be voluntary; and
- take the form
  - of a commission or omission;
  - of a state of affairs prohibited by law; or
  - of causing a consequence prohibited by law.

==== Human act ====
Criminal law is concerned with punishing the acts of human beings. The act, therefore, must be a human act; it must be committed or carried out by a human being. This is self-explanatory. The criminal justice system is not used to punish animals for their misconduct. If, however, a human uses an animal to carry out a criminal act—for example, if he incites a dog to bite someone—this does not exonerate the perpetrator: It is the human act, the incitement of the dog, which is punishable.

==== Voluntariness ====
Criminal law is concerned with punishing only such conduct as the accused has the power to prevent or avoid if he wants to. In order, therefore, to attract criminal liability, the accused's conduct must in the first instance be voluntary. The term "voluntary," as it is used in this part of the enquiry, has a special and restricted meaning. It has nothing to do with what the accused intended or desired or wanted to do; it is concerned merely with whether or not the accused's actions were controlled by his conscious will, in the sense that the accused was physically able to direct them, prevent them or stop them, if he chose to do so. If the relevant act or omission is involuntary, the general rule is that the accused is not criminally liable.

The State bears the onus of proving that the accused's conduct was voluntary. If, however, the accused alleges that he acted involuntarily, he must lay an evidential foundation for that defence. It is not sufficient for him simply to place the issue in dispute and leave it at that. Furthermore, even if the accused's act or omission was involuntary, he may yet be held criminally liable if the involuntary conduct was made possible by some prior voluntary conduct on his part.

Involuntary actions are not regarded as conduct for the purposes of criminal liability. The same applies to involuntary omissions, which are cases in which the accused failed to act as required by law, because he lacked the physical ability to control his actions at the relevant time. The following are therefore not usually regarded as examples of voluntary conduct for the purposes of criminal law:

- actions that result from imposed physical force;
- uncontrollable muscular movements, such as those resulting from pure muscular reflex, or from spasticity;
- acts and omissions that occur during sleep or unconsciousness; and
- acts and omissions that occur during a state of automatism. This last requires further discussion.

===== Automatism =====
As described in the English case of Bratty v A-G for Northern Ireland, automatism is any act which is performed by the muscles without any control of the mind. Examples include a spasm, reflex or convulsion, or an act by a person who is unconscious because he is a sleep. Bratty, in casu, had strangled a passenger in his car. His defence was that he had suffered a blackout and could not remember the critical events. Lord Denning, on appeal, dismissed this defence as "the first refuge of a guilty mind." He added, "An act is not involuntary merely because it is not remembered; amnesia does not equal automatism."

The word "automatism" is derived from "automaton," which refers to a mechanical device with no thought or will of its own. A person might to perform what appears to be a conscious and goal-directed action, but he might actually not be in conscious control of that action, or even aware of what he is doing. In some cases, such a person commits acts which, if committed voluntarily, would amount to crimes. Because his conduct is involuntary, however, he cannot be held criminally liable for those acts or their consequences.

Cases of genuine automatism are uncommon and may be difficult to prove. Automatism is sometimes classified according to whether or not it is

- organic;
- toxic; or
- psychogenic.

Formerly the courts would draw a distinction between "sane" and "insane" automatism. Where the automatism is due to a mental illness or defect (whether psychogenic or organic), it is termed insane automatism. In such cases, the accused must raise the defence of mental illness or defect. This defence excludes criminal capacity rather than unlawful conduct. It has two significant consequences for the accused:

1. He bears the burden of proving his defence on a balance of probabilities.
2. If his defence succeeds, the court is obliged to enter a special "verdict," with the result that the accused may run the risk of being detained indefinitely in a mental institution.

In S v Stellmacher, a case which illustrates the difference between sane and insane automatism, Stellmacher was an epileptic who, while in a state of automatism, shot and killed someone. Before the incident, he had been on a severe diet for some weeks. On the day in question, he ate nothing and did hard physical labour. At about 18:00, he went to the bar of the local hotel and drank half a bottle of brandy. He had a gun with him. There, in the bar, according to his evidence, he "lapsed into a state of automatism, as a result of the strong reflection in his eyes of the setting sun through an empty bottle." He then became involved in an altercation with someone in the bar, took out his gun, let off a few shots, and then, for no apparent reason, proceeded to shoot the deceased, who had just entered the bar to ask if he could order a drink.

At the trial, expert evidence was led that Stellmacher was suffering from "amnesia and automatism" due to hypoglycaemia and/or epilepsy, possibly triggered by his fasting and drinking. The central issue was not whether or not he should be convicted of murder—it was accepted that he was not liable—but rather whether or not he had suffered from a temporary mental disorder, necessitating a special verdict. The court held that Stellmacher's automatism, in this case, was due to physical factors, not any physical abnormality, so a special verdict was not required. He was found not guilty and acquitted outright.

Among the more common forms and causes of sane automatism are the following:

- sleepwalking;
- epilepsy;
- hypoglycaemia;
- blackouts;
- amnesia; and
- intoxication.

There has in recent years been a move away from the distinction between sane and insane automatism, because of the confusion it causes, given that the defence of "insane automatism" is actually nothing more or less than the defence of mental illness.

====== Epilepsy ======
One example of automatism may be found in cases of epilepsy, the main symptom of which is repeated seizures, usually with convulsions. The exact causes of epilepsy are not fully known or understood, but it is thought to be caused by a chemical imbalance in the brain, resulting in some of the nerve cells becoming overactive and firing off random, uncontrolled signals. This results in seizures.

Movements performed during an epileptic seizure are involuntary. Generally, therefore, they cannot result in criminal liability. Because, however, the cause of epilepsy is centred in the brain, there was doubt for some time as to whether or not it should perhaps be regarded as a mental illness or defect. If so, this would mean that the defence of insanity would have to be raised, relying on the Criminal Procedure Act of 1977. It was ultimately settled, though, that epilepsy in South African law is not a mental illness or defect. A special verdict, therefore, is not required.

A case in which a defence relying on epilepsy succeeded is R v Mkize. Mkize was an epileptic. One day, while cutting meat with a sharp knife, he experienced an episode that the testifying expert described at trial as an "epileptic equivalent"--"an attack where the ordinary fit is replaced by a period of confusion." During this episode, for no apparent reason, he suddenly stabbed and killed his sister, standing next to him. He was charged with her murder. His defence was that his conduct was involuntary. The court found, on a balance of probabilities, that he had indeed suffered an "epileptic equivalent." He had been unconscious, with "neither judgment, will, purpose nor reasoning." The stabbing was a result of "blind reflex activity." There was no intention to kill. His actions, therefore, could not constitute unlawful conduct for the purposes of criminal liability. The verdict was "not guilty."

====== Culpable prior voluntary conduct ======
Although involuntary acts and omissions cannot, in themselves, give rise to criminal liability, a situation that requires special consideration is when the accused is liable not on the basis of his final involuntary act or omission, but on the basis rather of some prior voluntary conduct, coupled with the required form of fault (usually negligence), where such conduct is causally connected to the later involuntary act or omission.

In R v Victor, the appellant knew that he was prone to epileptic fits—he had been since the age of fourteen or fifteen—but nevertheless drove a motor car, against medical advice. One day, he suffered a fit while driving and collided with a pedestrian and another car. Someone was badly hurt. He was charged with and convicted of reckless or negligent driving—not because he was epileptic, but because he had chosen to drive when a reasonable person would have foreseen the likelihood of a fit and its consequences. He should not in the circumstances have driven at all. Even though his conduct was involuntary at the time of the accident, he could not use his disability to escape liability. He was convicted on the basis of his negligent prior voluntary conduct.

The driver in R v Schoonwinkel, also an epileptic, was charged with culpable homicide, having collided with and killed the driver of another car. The accused had suffered an epileptic fit at the time of the accident, rendering his mind a blank and leaving him with no time to take evasive action. Unlike Victor, Schoonwinkel had had only two previous and minor attacks, the last a long time before the accident. The court accepted that the nature of his epilepsy was such that he would not normally have realised or foreseen the dangers of driving. This evidence, distinguishing this case from Victor, exonerated him from criminal responsibility. His prior conduct had not been negligent.

====== Intoxication ======
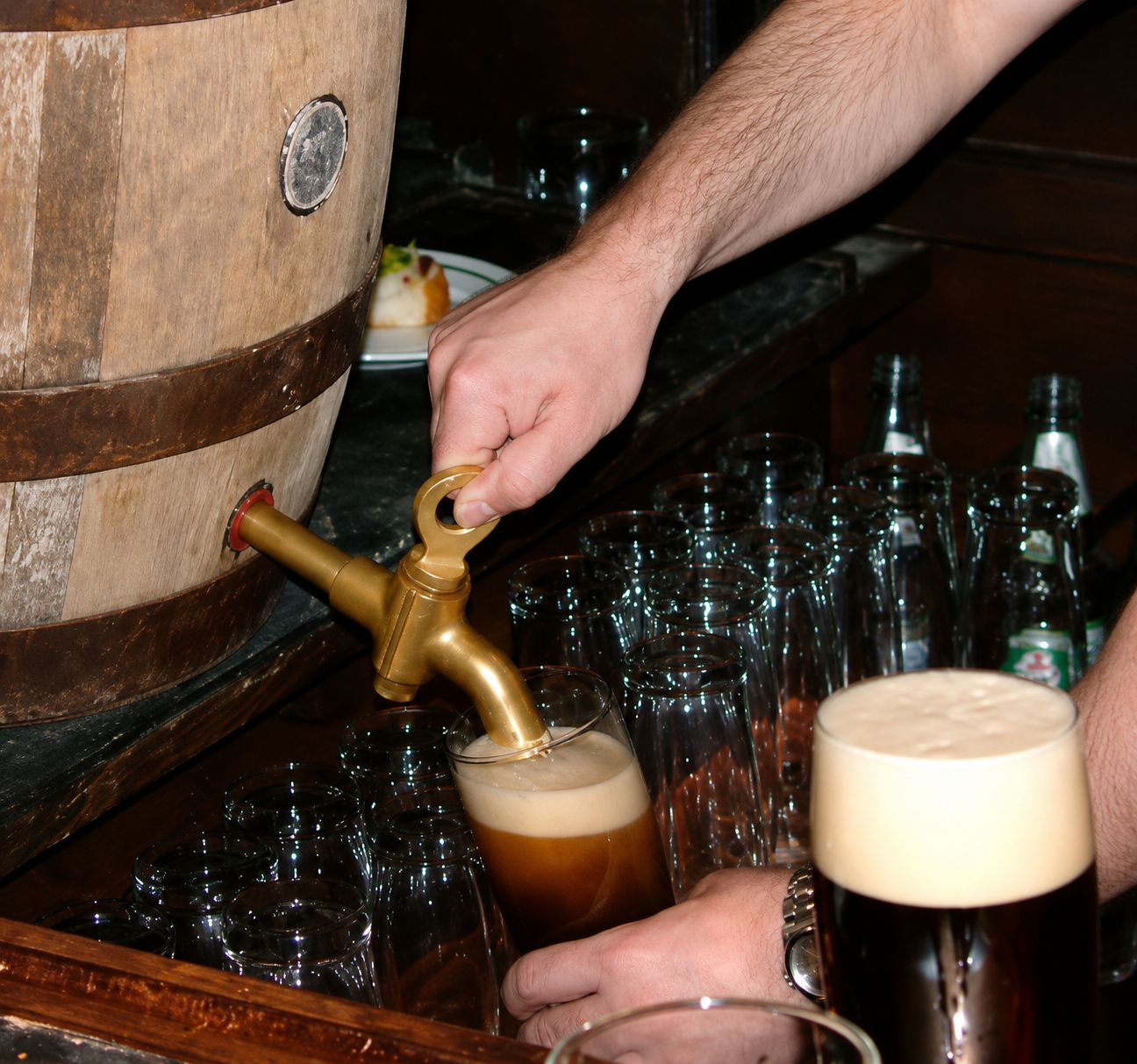
Voluntary intoxication

Another example of automatism may be found in cases of intoxication. When a person is extremely drunk, or otherwise intoxicated, this may lead to temporary loss of consciousness, and sometimes to automatic behaviour. South African law, as a general principle of criminal liability, does not distinguish between automatism as a result of intoxication and other forms of sane automatism, regardless of whether the intoxication is voluntary or involuntary. The Appellate Division reiterated in S v Johnson that only voluntary conduct is punishable. This includes voluntary drunkenness which does not result in a mental disease: It is no defence in respect of an offence committed during such drunkenness.

In S v Chretien the leading authority on the defence of intoxication, the Appellate Division held that voluntary intoxication may constitute an absolute defence, leading to a total acquittal, where, inter alia, the accused drinks so much that he lacks criminal capacity. In particular, the court distinguished between three different stages of intoxication and their effect on criminal liability:

1. If the accused was so drunk that he was performing involuntary movements with his arms and legs, he would not be criminally liable, because such movements would not be regarded as "conduct" for the purposes of criminal liability.
2. If he was less drunk, but drunk enough that he had lost his powers of insight and/or self-control, he would not be liable, because he would lack criminal capacity.
3. If he was even less drunk, but merely drunk enough that he failed to foresee the unlawful consequences of his actions, he would lack fault in the form of intention, and would therefore escape liability for a crime that required this form of fault—although he could still be negligent and might therefore not escape liability for a crime that required this form of fault.

The case of Chetrien explains why intoxication features as a defence under unlawful conduct, again under criminal capacity, and again under fault. For present purposes, however, it ought to be noted that it is only extreme intoxication that will lead to involuntary conduct.

The general principles that relate to voluntary intoxication have been modified, firstly by a long-standing principle of Roman-Dutch law, known as the actio libera in causa rule, and more recently by the provisions of the Criminal Law Amendment Act.

If a person deliberately gets drunk in order to commit a crime "that he might otherwise not have had the courage to commit," the actio libera in causa rule provides that he will be guilty of that crime, even if his conduct was not voluntary at the time of its commission, because the original cause of that conduct (getting drunk) was within his conscious control at the time he did so.

Chetrien led to "a public outcry," which resulted, seven years later, in the legislature's intervening to limit the destructive consequences of the decision. Parliament enacted section 1(1) of the Criminal Law Amendment Act, in "a vain attempt to reflect public sentiment on intoxication." In so doing, "the Legislature simply compounded the problems." Modelled on the German penal code, this provision created the special statutory offence of committing a prohibited act while in a state of criminal incapacity induced by the voluntary consumption of alcohol. In other words, it is a criminal offence in itself to commit a criminal act while one's criminal capacity is impaired by the voluntary use of an intoxicating substance, if one knows that the substance is one which tends to have an intoxicating effect, and if one is then found not liable for the crime in question due to one's lack of criminal capacity. This requires the prosecution to prove, beyond a reasonable doubt, that the accused is not liable for a common-law offence (although he may be subjected to the same punishment) because of the lack of capacity resulting from this self-induced intoxication, "so requiring the prosecution to engage in an unfamiliar volte face." As Burchell explains,

If the intoxication, leading to an acquittal of the common-law offence, is only sufficient to impair intention (as on the facts of Chretien), rather than sufficient to impair capacity, then no liability can result under s 1(1), as lack of capacity resulting from intoxication has to be proved for a conviction under s 1(1). The section is in dire need of reform or replacement with a more appropriately worded section.

===== Force =====
Another defence is force, which may take the form either of vis absoluta (absolute force) or vis compulsiva (relative force). In S v Goliath, the Appellate Division found that, on a charge of murder, compulsion can constitute a complete defence. When an acquittal may occur on this basis will depend on the particular circumstances of each case. The whole factual complex must be carefully examined and adjudicated upon with the greatest of care.

==== Commission or omission ====
Unlawful conduct most often takes the form of an act, or positive conduct, but there are occasions when an omission will be regarded as unlawful, and so will give rise to criminal liability.

===== Commission =====
In many cases, the accused's conduct will take the form of actually committing an act that has been prohibited by law. This type of unlawful conduct "probably corresponds most closely with the popular conception of a crime." Most common-law crimes fall into this category. For example,

- Cameron punches Armand, thus assaulting him;
- Mo has sexual intercourse with Georgia without her consent, thus raping her; and
- Theo breaks into Steve's house and steals his property, thus committing housebreaking and theft.

This form of unlawful conduct is "generally easy to identify and understand."

===== Omission =====
Unlawful conduct may also take the form of an omission, a failure to act. The position here is less straightforward. The general rule is that a person will not be criminally liable for failing to protect or rescue another person, because there is no general duty on any person to prevent harm from coming to another, even if it could be done easily, and even if it would be the morally correct thing to do. This rule is based on the recognition

- that the imposition of such an obligation must inevitably represent a serious invasion of personal liberty and freedom of action;
- that the law does not, as a general rule, seek to penalise a person simply for doing nothing; and
- that it is not the proper role of the law to enforce pure morality.

There are, however, certain situations where such a duty does exist, because the legal convictions of the community demand that, in these situations, the failure to protect or rescue should be regarded as unlawful.

====== General test for liability for omissions ======
An omission is punishable only if there is a legal duty upon someone to perform a certain type of active conduct. Minister of Police v Ewels, although a delictual case, expresses the general rule, with its broad and flexible test for liability arising out of omissions: An omission is to be regarded as unlawful conduct when the circumstances of the case are of such a nature

- not only that the omission incites moral indignation; but
- also that the legal convictions of the community demand that it be regarded as unlawful, and that the damage suffered be made good by the person who neglected to perform a positive act.

To make a determination as to whether or not there is unlawfulness, the question is not whether there was the usual "negligence" of the bonus paterfamilias; the question is whether, regard being had to all the facts, there was a duty in law to act reasonably. In Ewels, a citizen was assaulted in a police station by an off-duty officer in the presence of other officers. It was held by the court, on the facts of this case, that a policeman on duty, if he witnesses an assault, has a duty to come to the assistance of the person being assaulted. The failure of the police to do so made the Minister of Police liable for damages.

The flexible test in Ewels was adopted into criminal law in S v Gaba.

====== Crystallised categories of liability for omissions ======
In deference to the principle of legality, authors and commentators on criminal law usually rely on those established categories of liability which have emerged from the case law over the years. These categories of liability may be regarded as the crystallised legal convictions of the community referred to in Ewels. A legal duty to act may exist

- where a statute or the common law places such a duty on the accused (for example, to fill in a tax return);
- where prior positive conduct by the accused creates a potentially dangerous situation;
- where the accused has control of a potentially dangerous thing or animal;
- where a special or protective relationship exists between the parties, whether through natural relationship, contract or some other conduct whereby the accused deliberately, or even tacitly, assumes such a duty; and
- where a person occupies a certain public or quasi-public office which imposes on him, within the course and scope of his employment, a duty to act (like the office of policeman).

====== Prior positive conduct ======
In S v Russell, Russell was an employee of the Department of Water Affairs. Together with his supervisor and co-workers, he was unloading pipes onto a lorry at a railway station. The workers were using an overhead crane, parked under the railway's electric power lines. Because of the danger, the power had been switched off. While Russell's supervisor and co-workers were away having lunch, the power was turned on again. A railway employee told Russell to warn the crane operator about this—that is, about the danger of operating a crane under a live electric wire—when the workers returned. Russell accepted this instruction without pointing out that he was not the supervisor, and failed to pass on the warning when loading resumed. This omission, constituting negligence, led to one death, as the crane touched the power line and the operator was electrocuted. Russell was convicted of culpable homicide and appealed to the High Court (then the Supreme Court), which held that the way in which Russell had apparently accepted the warning had created a potentially dangerous situation. That being the case, he had attracted a legal duty to pass on the warning. By failing culpably in this duty, he was clearly negligent. His conviction of culpable homicide was confirmed.

====== Control of a dangerous thing or animal ======
In S v Fernandez, the court held that the appellant had been negligent in mending a cage from which a vicious baboon had subsequently escaped, which subsequently bit a child, who subsequently died. The appellant must have foreseen the likelihood of an attack in the event of the baboon's escaping; he was, the court held, rightly convicted of culpable homicide for failing take steps to prevent this: that is to say, for failing to keep the cage door in good repair.

====== Protective relationship ======
In Minister of Police v Skosana, there was a negligent delay in furnishing medical aid to the deceased, whose widow established, on a balance of probabilities, that he would not otherwise have died. She was granted damages. The duty to protect detainees, the court held, extends further than merely preventing them from being assaulted. There is also, for example, the duty to obtain medical treatment for them when necessary.

====== Public or quasi-public office ======
The police in Minister of Law & Order v Kadir failed to collect information which would have enabled the seriously injured respondent to pursue a civil claim against the driver of the other vehicle. The Minister raised an exception, contending that there was no legal duty on the police to collect such information. The court a quo dismissed this argument, finding that the community would consider otherwise. On appeal, however, the SCA held that society understood police functions to relate principally to criminal matters, maintaining law and order, and preventing and detecting and investigating crime. The police are not designed to assist civil litigants. Society would baulk at the idea of holding policemen personally liable for damages arising out of a relatively insignificant dereliction. The respondent had not proved the existence of a legal duty.

As for the State's duty to protect persons from violent crime, there are a number of suggestive delictual cases.

The Constitutional Court, in Carmichele v Minister of Safety & Security, found that the State could be held delictually liable for damages arising out of the unlawful omissions of its servants. In casu, the conduct of the police and a prosecutor had resulted in the release of a person, charged with rape, on his own recognisance. This person had subsequently assaulted the complainant. Snyman, for one, has noted the court's emphasis on section 39(2) of the Constitution, which provides that "every court [...] must promote the spirit, purport and objects of the Bill of Rights." This, he argues, "may perhaps one day open the way for holding an individual police officer liable for a crime such as culpable homicide flowing from her negligent omission to protect a person from the real possibility of harm."

In Minister of Safety & Security v Van Duivenboden, the Supreme Court of Appeal held that, while private citizens may be entitled to remain passive when the constitutional rights of other citizens are threatened, the State has a positive constitutional duty, imposed by section 7 of the Constitution, to act in protection of the rights in the Bill of Rights. The existence of this duty necessarily implies accountability. Where the State, represented by persons who perform its functions, acts in conflict with section 7, the norm of accountability must of necessity assume an important role in determining whether or not a legal duty ought to be recognised in any particular case. This norm need not always translate constitutional duties into private-law duties, enforceable by an action for damages; there are other remedies available for holding the State to account. Where, however, the State's failure to fulfil its constitutional duties occurs in circumstances that offer no effective remedy other than an action for damages, the norm of accountability will ordinarily demand the recognition of a legal duty, unless there are other considerations affecting the public interest which outweigh that norm.

The police in Minister of Safety & Security v Hamilton were negligent in their consideration and approval of an application for a firearm licence, accepting the correctness of information supplied by the applicant. They had a legal duty to "exercise reasonable care in considering, investigating, recommending and ultimately granting" such applications. Their failure properly to exercise this duty had resulted in the issuing of a firearm licence to an unfit person, who subsequently shot the respondent. The State was held to be delictually liable for the resultant damages.

In Van Eeden v Minister of Safety and Security, the appellant was assaulted, raped and robbed by a known dangerous criminal who had escaped from police custody. The court held that the State was obliged to protect individuals by taking active steps to prevent violations of the constitutional right to freedom and security of the person: inter alia, by protecting everyone from violent crime. It was also obliged under international law to protect women specifically from violent crime. In light of these imperatives, the court could no longer support the requirement of a special relationship between the plaintiff and the defendant for the imposition of a legal duty: The police have a duty to protect the public in general from known dangerous criminals in their custody.

====== Additional requirements ======
Once it has been established that the accused had a legal duty to prevent the harm, he will be liable for his failure to do so only if he had the necessary means and opportunity to prevent it from occurring, and if the harm that did occur is directly attributable to his unlawful omission.

=== Causation ===
Crimes of consequence should be distinguished from crimes of circumstance:

- A crime of circumstance is one in which it is the situation which is criminal (like the mere possession of an offensive weapon), rather than any result (like murder) which flows from the situation.
- A crime of consequence, or a "materially-defined crime," is one in which the conduct itself is not criminal, but in which the result of that conduct is. It is not unlawful merely to throw a stone; if it is thrown at and hits a person, it is. The precise nature of the crime, furthermore, is contingent on the result: If the stone causes serious injury, the crime will be grievous bodily harm; if it kills a person, the crime could be murder or culpable homicide.

Causation is not a general element of liability. Causation describes the way in which the definitional elements of some crimes are met.

In all consequence crimes, the State bears the onus of proving, beyond a reasonable doubt, that there is a sufficient link between the accused's initial conduct and the prohibited consequence. If there is no causal link, or if the link is too tenuous, the accused will not be guilty of the crime, although he may perhaps be guilty of an attempt to commit that crime, or of some other offence.

There are two forms of causation which have to be proven. They form part of a two-stage causation enquiry:

1. The State must first establish whether or not there is a causal link or nexus between the accused's initial conduct and the consequence in question. If there is no causal link, there can be no liability; that is the end of the matter. If there is a causal link, the State proceeds to the next step.
2. The next step is to consider whether the link thus established is sufficiently close and strong. The closeness and strength of the link must be such that, as a matter of law and policy, the accused ought to be held liable for his role in producing that consequence.

The two-stage enquiry may be broken down into two elements: a factual element (the first stage) and a legal or policy element (the second).

==== Factual causation ====
The first stage of the enquiry is aimed at determining whether the accused's conduct was the actual or "scientific" cause of the consequence, in that the consequence would not have occurred, either at all or when it did, had not it been for the accused's conduct. To decide this, the court will apply the condictio sine qua non test, also known as the "but-for" theory. A condictio sine qua non is a condition without which something—that is to say, the prohibited situation—would not have materialised: literally, "the condition without which ... not."

===== Commission =====
In the case of a positive act, the but-for test holds that, if not for that act, the unlawful consequence would not have ensued. The question to be asked is this: Can the act be notionally or hypothetically eliminated, without the disappearance of the consequence (at the time of the consequence), from the sequence of events which led to the consequence?

- If not, the accused's conduct was a factual cause of the consequence.
- If, however, there is a reasonable possibility that the consequence would have occurred in any event, the accused's conduct did not factually cause the consequence, and the accused will not be liable.

===== Omission =====
In the case of an omission, the condicio sine qua non theory considers whether, but-for the omission, the consequence would not have ensued. In other words, we notionally or hypothetically insert the requited positive act into the sequence of events, in place of the accused's inaction, and then consider whether or not the consequence in question would have occurred when it did:

- If the consequence would not have occurred, the accused's omission is proved to have been the factual cause of that consequence.
- If, however, there is a reasonable possibility that the consequence would have occurred in any event, the accused cannot be held to have caused that consequence, and will not be held liable.

In S v Van As, Van As was a police officer. One night, he and a number of other policemen arrested a man for drunken driving and took him into custody. While the police were locking the suspect in a patrol van, the five young children in his company disappeared. The detainee begged the police to look for them. The police made a cursory search, but failed to find them. Three of the children managed to make their way home, but the following morning two of them were found dead from exposure. The police, including Van As, were charged with and convicted of culpable homicide. On appeal, however, the Appellate Division reversed the trial court's decision. It held that, although it would have been reasonable to continue the search and make further enquiries, it had not been proved, beyond reasonable doubt, that the children would have been found by a proper search had one been undertaken. It had also not been so proven that the failure to institute such a search was responsible for the children's deaths. The State, then, was unable to show that the deaths had been factually caused by the omission of the police.

In Minister of Police v Skosana (noted earlier), there was a negligent delay in furnishing medical treatment to a prisoner who had been injured in a car accident and was then arrested for drunken driving. He ultimately died of his wounds. His widow brought a claim for damages arising out of his wrongful death, and was able to establish, on a balance of probabilities, that he would not have died "but for" that delay. There was adequate proof, in other words, that the deceased would probably have survived had he received medical treatment sooner. Having thus proved that the delay was a conditio sine qua non of her husband's demise, the widow was found to be entitled to damages.

==== Legal causation ====
The steps to take or questions to ask, in seeking to establish causation, are the following:

- Having regard to all the facts and circumstances, was X's conduct the factual cause of Y's death?
- If so, should the accused be held legally responsible for the consequence, either alone or in combination with other causal factors?

On the one hand, the law does not want individuals to escape liability for the natural and probable consequences of their conduct. On the other hand, the law does not seek to hold individuals liable for consequences that are too remote from their original conduct; otherwise the net of criminal liability would be spread too wide.

To determine whether or not it would be reasonable and fair to regard Andrew's act as the cause of Susy's death, for example, the court may invoke the aid of one or more specific theories of legal causation:

- the "proximate-cause" criterion, also known as direct-consequences or individualisation theory;
- the theory of adequate causation; and
- the novus actus interveniens criterion.

===== Proximate cause =====
In terms of the proximate-cause criterion, the act of the accused may be seen to be the legal cause of a particular result only if the result arose directly from the accused's conduct. The conduct will not be regarded as such if some new act or event intervened, between the accused's conduct and the consequence in question, to alter the natural and probable course of events in such a way that the accused's conduct, even though it may have been the original (and thus the factual) cause of the consequence, can no longer be regarded as its direct or proximate—that is, its closest—cause. If this happens, we say that the "chain" of causation has been broken. The accused, accordingly, is absolved from liability.

S v Daniels provides what Synman describes as "the clearest" rejection of the theory of proximate cause in South African law. Two judges of appeal expressly refused to accept that only an act which is a proximate cause of death may qualify as its cause.

In S v Tembani, however, it seemed to the Witwatersrand Local Division to be "of overriding importance that the original wound inflicted by the accused was an operating and substantial cause of the death of the deceased."

The idea of a proximate cause was expressed negatively in R v Mubila, with the statement that there must be no novus actus interveniens between X's conduct and Y's death, as well as positively, in the contention that Y's death must follow directly from X's conduct.

Snyman, endorsing Daniels, describes proximate cause as "too vague and arbitrary to serve as a satisfactory criterion" for legal causation.

===== Adequate cause =====
In terms of the theory of adequate causation, an act is the legal cause of a situation if, according to human experience, in the normal course of events, the act has the tendency to bring about that type of situation. This theory, as noted above, was invoked in Daniels.

There are a number of knowledge-based considerations:

- All of those factual circumstances which are ascertainable by a sensible person should be taken into consideration. The thin skull of the deceased, if he had one, would be an example.
- The extra or particular knowledge of the accused is not omitted. If the accused has knowledge in addition to that which an ordinary sensible person would possess, that knowledge is to be taken into account as well.
- The totality of human knowledge, including that which only a specialist possesses, must also be considered.
- Knowledge may even be considered which comes to light only after the occurrence or event.

In R v Loubser, Rumpff J declared that, in the eyes of the law, an act is the cause of a situation if, according to human experience, the situation will flow from the act.

===== Novus actus interveniens =====
A novus actus interveniens (or nova causa interveniens) is a new intervening act, or a new intervening cause: that is to say, an abnormal interposition or event which breaks the chain of causation. A number of factors are important, according to Burchell, in determining what kind of intervening act or event breaks the causal chain. It is important to bear in mind that this stage of the enquiry involves strong policy considerations. It is not an enquiry merely into whether or not there was some kind of additional or external factor that contributed towards the consequence in question; the enquiry is into whether that factor is of such a nature and magnitude that it should exonerate the accused from liability for the actual consequences of his conduct.

If an act or event is unlikely, in light of human experience, to follow the accused's act, it is more probable that it will be found to be a novus actus interveniens.

If the act of the accused is of a kind which is unlikely to cause death, the intervening act or event is considerably more likely to be regarded as a novus actus interveniens.

The accused need not be the sole cause of the consequence.

Voluntary conduct—conduct which is free and informed—is more likely to be regarded as a novus actus interveniens than involuntary conduct.

An abnormal event, otherwise amounting to a novus actus interveniens, will not be so counted if it was foreseen by the accused (or, in cases of negligence, if it ought reasonably to have been foreseen), or if it was planned by him.

The victim's pre-existing physical susceptibilities are, by logical definition, never an intervening cause. Where, therefore, the victim was suffering from a physical condition, such as a weak heart, haemophilia, a cerebral aneurism or an earlier injury, rendering him particularly susceptible to harm, and thereby contributing to his death, the maxim in South African law is that "you take your victim as you find him," with all his weaknesses and susceptibilities. This rule, commonly known as the "thin skull" or "eggshell skull" rule, comes from a number of early English cases in which the victims were found to have had abnormally thin skulls, which rendered them especially vulnerable to harm in cases of relatively minor injury.

In determining whether or not medical intervention ranks as a novus actus interveniens, it is important to determine whether or not the intervention was negligent or in some other way improper. Where the deceased died as a result of (possibly risky) medical treatment, necessitated by the injury inflicted by the accused, and which was administered in good faith, it is not a novus actus interveniens. The same applies if the accused died as a result of complications, such as an infection, which arose directly from such an injury.

It is also clear that a doctor's inability to save the life of a victim who is already moribund or dying is not a novus actus interveniens. Whether the withdrawal of a life-support system by a medical practitioner may be regarded as a novus actus arose in S v Williams, where it was held that such medical conduct did not break the causal sequence set in motion by Williams, who had shot the deceased, thereby inflicting those initial wounds on the deceased which had necessitated her being put on the respirator in the first place. Within 48 hours, she had been pronounced brain-dead, and the respirator duly disconnected. When Williams was tried for her murder, he claimed that he had not been the cause of her death; it was, rather, the conduct of the doctors in disconnecting the respirator. On being convicted, he appealed to the Appellate Division, where the court distinguished between "ending a fruitless attempt to save life" and a positive act causing death, and held that, since the injury inflicted by Williams had been a mortal or life-threatening one, and since the deceased was being kept alive only by artificial means, the doctors did not cause her death when they disconnected the respirator. They were merely ending a fruitless attempt to save her life. Williams's conviction was therefore upheld.

In S v Counter, the appellant had shot the deceased, lodging a bullet in her buttock. Unbeknownst either to her or to her doctors, the bullet had penetrated her anal canal, causing virulent septicaemia and leading to the pneumonia from which, two weeks later, she died. It fell to the SCA to decide whether it was the shot fired or rather medical negligence which had caused her death:

The sequence of events from the time of the deceased's admission until her death was not interrupted by any causal factor which affected or changed the natural order of events, more particularly there was no intervention or omission by the persons responsible for her care [...]. It is inconceivable in these circumstances that the appellant should not be held responsible for the consequences of his actions, which led directly to his wife's death by stages entirely predictable and in accordance with human experience.

Finally, it has been held in various decisions that, where X encourages Y to commit suicide—suicide, in itself, is not punishable in South African law—or where X provides Y with the means to commit suicide, the subsequent voluntary conduct of Y in committing suicide does not necessarily break the causal chain of events set in motion by X. Y's conduct, in other words, does not amount to a novus actus interveniens. If Y's suicide was foreseen, X may be guilty of murder; if her suicide was unforeseen, but reasonably foreseeable, X will be guilty of culpable homicide.

In R v Motomane (of which Snyman disapproves), the accused, charged with murder, had knifed a woman, thereby injuring a vein. The bleeding stopped, but a clot formed. The woman would probably have recovered in the ordinary course of events, but this course was interrupted when a medical practitioner decided to operate: a prudent decision but not a strictly necessary one. The clot was disturbed during the operation; the woman bled to death. The court held that the causal chain had been broken, and that the Crown had failed to prove that the accused was responsible for the death.

The court in S v Tembani, endorsed the approach of English law: If, at the time of death, the original wound is still an operating and substantial cause of death, the death is a result of the wound, even if another cause was also operating. Death is not the result of the original wound if it is just the setting in which another cause operates. Only if the second cause is so overwhelming as to make the original wound merely part of the history may it be said that death does not flow from the wound.

In S v Tembani, it was held that the deliberate infliction of an intrinsically dangerous wound, from which the victim was likely to die without medical intervention, must generally lead to liability for an ensuing death, whether or not the wound was readily treatable, and even if the medical treatment given later was substandard or negligent—unless the victim had so recovered that at the time of the negligent treatment the original injury no longer posed a danger to his life.

There is one situation in which an intervening act or event that would ordinarily qualify as a novus actus interveniens will not be regarded as such. This occurs when the intervening act or event was actually planned, intended or foreseen by the accused, in the sense that it was a calculated part of the causal sequence. As some authorities put it, intended consequences can never (almost by definition) be "too remote" to found liability. The relevant principle has been explained by the Appellate Division, which ruled in Ex parte die Minister van Justisie: In re S v Grotjohn that, where the act is a calculated part of the chain of causation which the perpetrator started, and is an eventuality which the perpetrator foresees as a possibility, and which he desires to employ to obtain his object, it would be contrary to accepted principles of law, and to all sense of justice, to allow him to take shelter behind the act as a novus actus interveniens.

In S v Daniels, X shot Y twice in the back with a firearm, whereupon Y fell to the ground. Still alive, he would nonetheless certainly have died unless he had received medical treatment within about half an hour. This was highly unlikely, since the incident had occurred on a lonely road in the countryside. X then threw the firearm to the ground near Y. Shortly thereafter Z appeared, picked up the firearm and killed Y with a shot through the ear.

Of the five judges of appeal, two held that X and Z had acted with a common purpose, and that their joint purpose was therefore the cause of death. According, however, to the interpretation of the evidence by the other three judges, X and Z had acted independently. None of the judges doubted that Z's act was a cause of death. The question for the three judges to decide was whether, assuming independence, X's act also amounted to a cause of death.

Two of the three held that there was indeed causal link, and that policy considerations did not demand that Z's act qualify as a novus actus interveniens, breaking the chain of causation between X's act and Y's death. This judgment is preferred by Snyman, since the two shots X fired into Y's back would in any event have caused his death, even had not Z also fired a shot into Y. Human experience showed that X's shots would have the tendency, in the ordinary course of events, to result in death.

===== Flexible criterion =====
Although most authorities agree on the need for a second stage to the enquiry into causation, there is no unanimity as to exactly what it should entail. The courts have been reluctant to reduce the enquiry to a simple, mechanistic one. The courts have never, for example, adopted the sole-cause approach; nor have they attached much weight to such simplistic factors as proximity in terms of time and space.

In S v Mokgethi, the Appellate Division (per Judge of Appeal Hennie van Heerden) discussed the various approaches to legal causation, and held that it is wrong to identify only one of these theories as the correct one, to be applied in all cases, and in so doing to exclude from consideration the other theories of legal causation. All available theories could be used to assist in the main enquiry, which is simply whether or not there is "a sufficiently close nexus" between the accused's initial conduct and the ensuing consequence, or whether the consequence is "too remote" for the purposes of founding criminal liability. One should apply a flexible criterion: The over-riding consideration is the demands of what is fair and just. In endeavouring to ascertain what is a fair and just conclusion, a court may take into consideration the different theories of legal causation referred to above and use them as guides in reaching a conclusion.

The problem with a flexible test, however, "is that it provides little guidance to a court, and so it does not help to create the reasonable certainty of outcome that we need in criminal law in order to satisfy the principle of legality." This is why, for practical reasons, and despite the dictum in Mokgethi, it will be found that the preponderance of South African case law still tends to favour the direct or proximate-cause approach.

=== Unlawfulness ===
Snyman notes that, even once conduct and compliance with the definitional aspects of the crime have been established, there are still two more very important requirements for liability: first unlawfulness and then culpability.

A finding of unlawfulness is based on the standard of objective reasonableness, which is based in turn on boni mores or the legal convictions of the community.

The following defences or grounds of justification, among others, will exclude unlawfulness:

- private defence;
- impossibility;
- superior orders;
- disciplinary chastisement;
- public authority; and
- consent.

==== Private defence ====
A person acts in private defence if he uses force to repel an unlawful attack by another upon his person or his property or another recognised legal interest. In these circumstances, any harm or damage inflicted upon the aggressor is not unlawful.

===== Attack =====
The following are the requirements relating to the attack. There must be

- an attack, which had either commenced or was imminent; and
- which was unlawful;
- upon a legally protected interest.

In R v K, the court held that the assault need not be committed culpably. It is also possible to act in private defence against someone who lacks criminal capacity, such as a mentally disordered person.

Most often one acts in private defence in protection of life or limb, but there is no reason in principle why one cannot act in private defence in protection of other interests, such as one's property, as well. The Appellate Division in S v Jackson held that a person is justified in killing in self-defence not only when he fears that his life is in danger but also when he fears grievous bodily harm. In R v Patel, the court ruled that a person has the same right to use force in defence of another from a threatened danger as he would have to defend himself, if he were the person threatened.

===== Defence =====
The defence must be

- directed against the attacker;
- necessary to avert the attack; and
- a reasonable response to the attack.

In R v Zikalala, where the accused stabbed and killed the deceased in a crowded beer hall, he claimed that the deceased had attacked him with a knife, and that he was acting in self-defence. He was convicted of murder; he appealed. The Appellate Division held,

The evidence is that the hall was packed and that movement therein was difficult. But the observation places a risk upon the appellant that he was not obliged to bear. He was not called upon to stake his life upon "a reasonable chance to get away". If he had done so he may well have figured as the deceased at the trial, instead of as the accused person. Moreover, one must not impute to a person who suddenly becomes the object of a murderous attack that mental calm and ability to reason out ex post facto ways of avoiding the assault without having recourse to violence.

No-one, then, is obliged to flee if flight does not offer a safe avenue of escape: for example, if it would merely expose one to a stab in the back. In such circumstances a person is entitled to stand his ground and defend himself. Zikalala's conviction was overturned.

===== Test =====
The test for private defence is an objective one. If X thinks that he is in danger, but in fact is not, or if he thinks that someone is unlawfully attacking him, but in fact the attack is lawful, his defensive measures do not constitute private defence.

Where an accused is charged with murder, the court held in S v Ntuli, but he is convicted of culpable homicide for exceeding the bounds of reasonable self-defence, an assault will have been involved if it is found that the accused realised that he was applying more force than was necessary.

As to the means of defence being commensurate with the danger threatened, the court in Ntsomi v Minister of Law & Order found that it had to apply an objective test ex post facto. Where a policeman is attacked during the performance of his duty, the criterion of a reasonable policeman, compelled to act in the same circumstances, should be applied. A policeman attempting to effect a lawful arrest is not obliged to flee from an unlawful assault: The victim of such an assault is entitled, if he has no reasonable alternative, to defend himself with whatever weapon he has at hand.

===== Putative private defence =====
If the accused believes, erroneously but honestly, that his person or property is in danger, his conduct in defence of it is not private defence. His mistake, however, may remove the element of intention.

The accused in S v De Oliveira, who lived in a secure and burglar-proofed house in a dangerous area, was awoken one afternoon by the presence of several men outside the house on his driveway. He picked up his pistol, opened window and fired six shots. Two of them hit the men, one killing and the other injuring. There was no indication that an attack on the house was imminent. The accused failed to testify; his defence of putative private defence failed. He was convicted of murder and of two counts of attempted murder.

===== Private defence of property =====
This defence is available when a person uses force to defend an interest in property: for example,

- to prevent a would-be thief or robber from taking his own property, or that of another;
- to prevent someone from damaging or destroying his own or another's property; or
- to prevent an intruder from entering his own or another's property. This would include the use of such preventive devices as spiked fences and electrified fencing.

The requirements for private defence of property are similar in many respects to those for private defence of persons, but there are certain differences. The following are conditions relating to the attack. There must be evidence that

- the property was
- presently
- in danger of damage or destruction
- that was unlawful.

The defence of property must be

- directed against the attacker;
- necessary to avert the danger; and
- a reasonable response to the attack.

In Ex parte Die Minister van Justisie: in re S v Van Wyk, the Appellate Division held that the onus is on the State to rebut private defence of property, just as it carries the onus to rebut private defence of person.

The property should not be of negligible value. In S v Mogohlwane, Mogohlwane had been robbed by the deceased, who had been armed with a tomahawk, of a bag containing his clothing, shoes and food. Mogohlwane then went to his home, nearby, fetched a knife and returned to recover his property. When Mogohlwane tried to take back his bag, the deceased resisted and again threatened him with the tomahawk. Mogohlwane then stabbed him with the knife, causing his death. Mogohlwane was charged with murder. The court held that, in determining whether or not the property is of trivial value, it could be taken into account that the accused (as was the case in casu) might not be richly endowed with earthly possessions. What may be of little value to a wealthy person may be of great value to a poor person. Given Mogohlwane's financial circumstances, the stolen items were of value to him. Mogohlwane was justified in his conduct, because his attempt to recover his property was close enough in time to the robbery to be part of the same chain of events. The State had not proved that there was a less dangerous and more effective means or method reasonably available to the accused to defend himself against the act of robbery, so it was decided that Mogohlwane had acted in private defence and therefore lawfully.

==== Necessity ====
A person acts out of necessity, and his act is therefore lawful, if he acts in protection of his own or of somebody else's life, bodily integrity, property or some other legally recognised interest, endangered by a threat of harm which has commenced or is imminent, and which cannot be averted in any other way—provided that the person is not legally compelled to endure the danger, and provided that the interest protected is not out of proportion to the interest necessarily infringed by the protective act. It is immaterial whether the threat of harm takes the form of compulsion or emanates from a non-human agency such as force of circumstance.

Private defence and necessity are closely related: Both allow a person to protect interests of value to him, such as life, bodily integrity and property, against threatening danger. There are also differences between them:

- Private defence always stems from and is always directed at an unlawful human attack; necessity, on the other hand, may stem either from an unlawful human attack or from chance circumstances, such as an act of nature.
- Whereas, in cases of private defence, the act of defence is always directed at an unlawful human attack, in cases of necessity it is directed at either the interests of another innocent party or a mere legal provision.

Necessity may arise either from compulsion or from inevitable evil.

An example of compulsion is where Craig orders Richman to commit a punishable act, such as setting ablaze Helena's motor car, and threatens to kill Richman if he fails to comply. Richman duly complies. The emergency here is the result of unlawful human conduct; the act (of arson) is directed at an innocent third person, namely Helena.

In the case of inevitable evil, the emergency situation is the result of non-human intervention, such as an act of nature (a flood, for example) or some other chance circumstance like a shipwreck. If a fire breaks out in Y's house, and X, in order to escape, has to break through a window, he may reply to a charge of malicious damage to property with a defence of necessity. If X's baby gets hold of a bottle of pills and swallows all of them, and X in rushing her to hospital exceeds the speed limit, he may also rely on necessity.

In S v Bailey, the Appellate Division found that a person is guilty of a crime in respect of which intention is a requirement where it is proved that

- he unlawfully and deliberately committed or caused the alleged act or consequence as contained in the definition of the crime;
- he acted under duress, in bona fide fear for his life;
- the duress was not so strong that a reasonable person in the position of the accused would have yielded to it; and
- there were no other possible grounds present for the exclusion of culpability.

===== Requirements =====
====== Legal interest ======
The mere danger of losing one's job does not give one the right to act out of necessity, held the court in S v Canestra. If one cannot exercise one's profession without contravening the law, one ought to find another profession.

====== Commenced or imminent ======
In S v Mtewtwa, the court held that, for the defence of necessity to be applicable, the threat or danger sought to be averted must still be in existence; it must not yet be over. If it were over, there would be nothing to avert.

====== Not the accused's own fault ======
It is a fundamental rule of South African law that one may not profit from one's own wrongdoing. A person may not use his own prior negligence or misconduct to justify his later actions and escape liability. According to this rule, an accused would not be able to rely on the defence of necessity where he cause the threat or danger himself, through his own culpable conduct.

It is unclear, however, to what extent this rule holds good—at least when it is expressed in absolutist terms: "A qualified and more nuanced approach seems more appropriate." Snyman's view is that the rule only applies to cases in which the accused was actually aware that he was creating a risk of danger through his prior conduct, but persisted in that conduct anyway, but it does not apply to cases in which the accused, although negligent, was oblivious to the risk he was creating.

As the SCA decided, in S v Lungile, "A person who voluntarily joins a criminal gang or group and participates in the execution of a criminal offence cannot successfully raise the defence of compulsion when, in the course of such execution, he is ordered by one of the members of the gang to do an act in furtherance of such execution."

In S v Bradbury, a member of a gang reluctantly played a lesser role in a murder due to fear of reprisals if he refused. The Appellate Division found that there was a need for a deterrent to this kind of gangsterism. The decision of the trial judge to impose the death sentence was therefore not so unreasonable as to warrant the appeal court's intervention. "As a general proposition," wrote Holmes JA, "a man who voluntarily and deliberately becomes a member of a criminal gang with knowledge of its disciplinary code of vengeance cannot rely on compulsion as a defence or fear as an extenuation."

In both Bradbury and Lungile, the accused was aware that he was creating a risk of danger through his prior conduct.

====== Necessary ======
The course of action taken by the accused must have been necessary in order to avert the threatened harm or danger. This does not mean that there must literally have been no alternative, but merely that there was no other practical way of averting the threatened harm or danger. The test here is objective: whether or not, in light of all the circumstances, a reasonable person could be expected to resist the threat.

====== Reasonable ======
The Appellate Division in R v Mahomed, which cites some of the old authorities on the subject, held that the accused's actions, and the means used, must be a reasonable response to the threatened danger. This means

- that the accused must not have done more harm than was actually necessary to avert the harm or danger;
- that the harm done must not be greater than the harm avoided. The accused must have chosen the lesser of two evils.

In S v Malan, the accused (a farmer) had for many years suffered problems with stray animals causing damage to his land. Having exhausted all remedies, from impounding the animals to sending messages to their owner, to no avail, the accused shot and killed the animals when they yet again strayed on to his land. The court found that such conduct was not unreasonable in the circumstances; therefore, it was lawful.

In the delictual case of Peterson v Minister of Safety & Security, the court cited Midgley and Van der Walt to the following effect:

The means used and measures taken to avert the danger of harm must not have been excessive, having regard to all the circumstances of the case.

===== Onus =====
In S v Pretorius, in which Pretorius broke the speed limit in rushing to hospital a seriously ill person, the court held that the onus of proof in a defence of necessity rests on the State, which must rule out the reasonable possibility of an act of necessity. It is not for the accused to satisfy the court that he acted from necessity.

In S v Mtewtwa, as we have seen, the court held that, where an accused's defence is one of compulsion, the onus lies on the State to show that a reasonable man would have resisted the compulsion. There is no onus on the accused to satisfy the court that he acted under compulsion.

===== Killing =====
The old authorities took the view that a person was never justified in killing an innocent person to save his own life. It was thought that a person should rather submit to death, although the threat to his own life might be regarded as a mitigating factor. This approach prevailed until relatively recent times, as is illustrated in the leading English criminal case of R v Dudley and Stephens, which established a precedent, throughout the common-law world, that necessity is not a defence to a charge of murder. The case concerned a four-man crew of a yacht who, after being cast adrift in a small lifeboat following a shipwreck, resorted to cannibalism at sea, believing their acts to be justified by their need to escape starvation.

After nearly three weeks at sea, Tom Dudley, the ship's captain, and another sailor, Ed Stephens, killed the ship's 17-year-old cabin boy, who had become sick from drinking seawater. They later argued that they had expected him to die anyway. The remaining sailor, Edmund Brooks, who had previously refused to draw lots, claimed to have neither assented nor protested the killing. The three men ate his remains for the next four days. They were rescued on the fifth. Dudley and Stephens, on a charge of murder, raised the defence of necessity. The court rejected this defence and convicted them, holding that the law forbids the killing of innocent victims even if one's own life is at stake.

In R v Werner and S v Bradbury, the Appellate Division essentially followed the same approach as in R v Dudley and Stephens. In Werner, a murder had been committed by prisoners of war acting on the orders of a superior officer. The court held that the killing of an innocent person by compulsion is never legally justifiable. As for Bradbury, a member of a dangerous gang, he had reluctantly played a minor role in a planned murder, being influenced thereto by fear of reprisals of a serious nature on himself or his family should he refuse. The trial judge had imposed the death sentence on him. In an appeal against this sentence, the Appellate Division held that, weighing the influence of fear against the need for a deterrent to this kind of gangsterism, there was nothing so unreasonable in the trial judge's decision as to justify a finding that his discretion had not been judicially exercised.

In S v Goliath, however, the court took a different view from that held in S v Bradbury and R v Dudley and Stephens. Goliath and another person (the first accused in the trial) came upon the deceased, and the first accused began to rob him. The first accused produced a knife and told Goliath to tie up the deceased. Goliath objected. The first accused said he would stab Goliath if he did not obey. Goliath then tied up the deceased. The first accused then stabbed the deceased to death. The first accused told Goliath to take off the deceased's shoes and, when Goliath hesitated, again threatened to kill him. Goliath complied. They were both charged with murder, Goliath as an accomplice. The trial court convicted the first accused, but acquitted Goliath on the basis that he had acted under compulsion. The State, however, reserved certain questions of law for decision by the Appellate Division. The most pertinent of these was whether or not the defence of compulsion could ever constitute a defence to murder. In reply, the Appellate Division confirmed that Goliath had been rightly acquitted, that is, it accepted that necessity, in the form of compulsion, can be a complete defence to the killing of an innocent third person. It is not a defence that will be accepted lightly, however; it will depend on all the surrounding circumstances. The whole factual complex must be carefully examined and adjudicated upon with the greatest care. In Goliath's case, the decisive factor was that the first accused had the means and the will to carry out his threat to kill Goliath there and then if Goliath did not comply with his demands. It also weighed heavily with the court that Goliath was neither the instigator nor the main perpetrator, merely a reluctant accomplice; nor did he profit in any way from the crime.

The defence of necessity on a murder charge was upheld in S v Peterson, since the State had not proved that a fictional reasonable person in the position of the accused would have offered resistance to the compulsion, including a threat against his life, which had been exerted by a co-accused.

==== Impossibility ====
The maxim lex non cogit ad impossibilia may be translated to mean that the law does not compel anyone to do the impossible. Impossibility is the appropriate defence (excluding unlawfulness) in cases where the law places a person under a legal duty to perform a positive act, and the person is unable to comply with this duty. The policy rationale for this ground of justification is that it would be unfair to punish an individual who contravened the law under conditions where he could not act otherwise. In this regard, impossibility might be regarded as "the flip-side of necessity," but the requirements of the two defences do not correspond exactly.

===== Defence =====
There must be a positive obligation imposed by law, which with it must be absolutely physically impossible to comply, not merely difficult or inconvenient. In R v Jetha, the appellant had sailed for India on 11 October 1926; his estate was provisionally sequestrated on 13 October 1926. In March 1929, after his return, he was convicted of contravening section 142(a) of the Insolvency Act, in that he had failed to attend the first meeting of his creditors on 11 November 1926. The court, on appeal, held that, as the appellant had not and could not have known of the date of the meeting until after it was held, and as it would have been physically impossible for him to attend even if he had known the date, there was no ground for the conviction.

The impossibility must not be the fault of the accused. In R v Korsten, an accused person took his cattle to be dipped in a township dip, but was prevented from dipping them by the township foreman, because he had not complied with a by-law which provided that no person should use the dipping tank except upon production of coupons, previously purchased, entitling him to do so. The accused's excuse for not having purchased such coupons was that he did not know that this was necessary. The court held that, inasmuch as the Animal Diseases Act imposed an absolute duty on the accused to dip his cattle, these facts afforded no defence.

==== Superior orders ====
The question here is whether or not an otherwise unlawful act may be justified by the fact that the accused was merely obeying the orders of a superior. The Romans phrased it thus: "He is free from blame who is bound to obey."

===== Requirements =====
To succeed in a defence of superior orders, it must be shown

- that the order came from a person lawfully placed in authority over the subordinate;
- that the subordinate was under a duty to obey the order; and
- that he did no more than was necessary to carry out the order.

These requirements are set out in S v Banda, where the court held that the defence of obedience to superior orders was a form of the defence of compulsion, in that the subordinate was compelled to follow the orders of his superior officer. It is considered unjust, therefore, to hold a soldier criminally liable for merely following orders. The rationale for the defence is that military discipline requires immediate and unquestioning obedience to orders, backed up by stern punishment for disobedience.

In Queen v Albert, the court held that a child under fourteen years of age, who assists his father in committing a crime, is presumed to do so in obedience to his father's orders, and is not punishable, even if he knew that he was performing a forbidden act—unless, in the case of a child above seven years of age, the crime is "atrocious," or so "heinous as obviously to absolve the person ordered to commit it from the duty of obedience."

In S v Banda (a treason trial held after the abortive military coup in Bophuthatswana), Friedman J drew a distinction between an unlawful and a manifestly unlawful order. Where orders are so manifestly and palpably unlawful that a reasonable man in the circumstances of the accused (a soldier in casu) would know them to be so, the duty to obey is absent, and the accused will be liable for acts committed pursuant to such orders. If, therefore, a soldier obeys an order which is unlawful, but not "manifestly and palpably illegal," he would still be able to rely on the defence of obedience to superior orders. If, however, a soldier is ordered to massacre civilians, or to rape and loot, he would not be able to rely on this defence, since conduct of this nature would be manifestly and palpably illegal.

In S v Mostert, which dealt with the applicability of the defence to orders by traffic officers, the court held that the order must have emanated from someone lawfully placed in authority over the accused, and that the accused must have been under a duty to obey the given order; finally, the accused must have done no more harm than was necessary to carry out the order. If the accused exceeds the limits of an order, he may not claim that he was acting under the orders of a superior.

==== Public authority ====
When officers of the courts, or of the law or the State generally, and in certain circumstances even private persons, as duly authorised instruments of the State, commit crimes in the proper exercise of such authority (including acts of aggression upon life, person and property), they may be immune from punishment.

===== Diplomatic or consular immunity =====
This defence is to be found in the Diplomatic Immunities and Privileges Act, which sets out the immunities and privileges of diplomatic missions and consular posts, and of the members of such missions and posts. Section 3 states that the Vienna Convention on Diplomatic Relations of 1961 is applicable to diplomatic missions and to the members of such missions; the Vienna Convention on Consular Relations of 1961 is applicable to consular posts and the members of such posts.

Section 4 provides that heads of state, special envoys or representatives from another state, or another government or organisation, are immune from the criminal and civil jurisdiction of the courts. They enjoy the privileges accorded them by customary international law, which extends their immunity also to their families, and to members of their staff and their families. The Minister must keep a register of all persons who are protected by such immunity.

Consuls, be they career or honorary, are not diplomatic agents. Nonetheless, they are, according to international law, entitled to immunity from civil and criminal proceedings in respect of official acts.

===== Court authority =====
The person officially authorised to execute either the civil or the criminal judgment of a court commits no crime in so doing. This exemption does not extend to cases in which the court has no jurisdiction. If officials of the court act beyond their jurisdiction, their actions are unlawful, but they may escape liability if they genuinely believe that they are acting lawfully. In S v Madihlaba, it was held that the court-authority exemption will not apply to a situation in which a court had no jurisdiction.

For a crime in which negligence is sufficient for liability, and if the official's belief was not only genuinely held, but also reasonable, he will not be liable.

The fact that a person works as a court official may indicate that he ought to know the law relating to his sphere of activity, and is therefore negligent.

The test of intention is subjective, so the reasonableness or otherwise of the accused's belief is in principle irrelevant. If, however, that belief is patently unreasonable, especially because the accused's occupation requires him to know better, this could constitute a factor from which the court may reach the conclusion that an inference of knowledge of unlawfulness can be drawn.

The powers of public officers and private citizens to arrest, either with or without a warrant, are set out in the Criminal Procedure Act (CPA). Provided that arrestors act within the limits of these powers, they are not liable for any assault or other crime necessarily committed to effect, or to attempt to effect, the arrest.

The old section 49 of the CPA distinguished between

- deadly force and non-deadly force; and
- a person who resisted arrest and a person who fled.

No common-law balance was required; there was no need to consider alternative means. Lethal force was permitted in respect of Schedule 1 offences.

The old section 49 has been amended by section 7 of the Judicial Matters Second Amendment Act, which came into force in 2003. An important case necessitated the change. In Govender v Minister of Safety & Security, the SCA read down section 49(1), specifically the words "use such force as may in the circumstances be reasonably necessary [...] to prevent the person concerned from fleeing," so as to exclude the use of a firearm or similar weapon, unless the person authorised to arrest a fleeing suspect, or to assist in arresting him, has reasonable grounds for believing

- that the suspect poses an immediate threat of serious bodily harm to him, or a threat of harm to members of public; or
- that the suspect has committed a crime involving the infliction or threatened infliction of serious bodily harm.

When applying the reasonableness standard, the nature and degree of force used must be proportionate to the threat posed by the accused to the safety and security of police officers and others.

In Ex parte Minister of Safety & Security: In re S v Walters, the Constitutional Court accepted as constitutionally sound the interpretation of section 49(1)(b) in Govender. This saved section 49(1) from invalidation.

Section 49(2), however, authorised police officers in the performance of their duties to use force where it might not be necessary or reasonably proportionate. This, the court found, was socially undesirable and constitutionally impermissible. The court declared section 49(2) to be inconsistent with the Constitution and therefore invalid, since it infringed the rights to dignity, life and security of person.

The court went on to state the law relating to the arrest of a suspect:

- The purpose of arrest is to bring before court for trial persons suspected of having committed offences.
- Arrest is not the only means of achieving this purpose, nor always the best.
- Arrest may never be used to punish a suspect.
- Where arrest is called for, force may be used only where necessary.
- Where force is necessary, only the least degree of force reasonably necessary may be used.
- In deciding what degree of force is both reasonable and necessary, all circumstances must be taken into account, including the threat of violence the suspect poses to the arrester or others, and the nature and circumstances of the offence the suspect is suspected of having committed—the force being proportional in all these circumstances.
- Shooting a suspect solely to carry out an arrest is permitted in very limited circumstances only. Ordinarily it is not permitted unless the suspect poses a threat of violence to the arrester or to others, or is suspected on reasonable grounds of having committed a crime involving the infliction or threatened infliction of serious bodily harm, and there are no other reasonable means of carrying out the arrest, whether at that time or later.
- These limitations in no way detract from the rights of an arrester, attempting to carry out an arrest, to kill a suspect in self-defence or in defence of any other person.

The new section 49(2) reads as follows:

If any arrestor attempts to arrest a suspect and the suspect resists the attempt, or flees, or resists the attempt and flees, when it is clear that an attempt to arrest him or her is being made, and the suspect cannot be arrested without the use of force, the arrestor may, in order to effect the arrest, use such force as may be reasonably necessary and proportional in the circumstances to overcome the resistance or to prevent the suspect from fleeing.

This is a statutory articulation of the reasonable or proportional test. The subsection goes on to say that "the arrestor is justified in terms of this section in using deadly force that is intended or is likely to cause death or grievous bodily harm to a suspect, only if he believes, on reasonable grounds,

- "that the force is immediately necessary for the purposes of protecting the arrestor, any person lawfully assisting the arrestor or any other person from imminent or future death or grievous bodily harm;
- "that there is a substantial risk that the suspect will cause imminent or future death or grievous bodily harm if the arrest is delayed; or
- "that the offence for which the arrest is sought is in progress and is of a forcible and serious nature and involves the use of life threatening violence or a strong likelihood that it will cause grievous bodily harm."

These limits are in addition to those discussed above.

==== Consent ====
- The complainant's consent in the circumstances must be recognised by law as a possible defence.
- The consent must be real and given voluntarily, without coercion.
- The consent must be given by a person capable in law of consenting.

===== Recognised by law =====
Consent is only a ground of justification in respect of some crimes. It is not a ground of justification in respect of

- treason;
- perjury; and
- murder,

It is a ground of justification in respect of

- rape;
- theft; and
- malicious injury to property.

It is sometimes a ground of justification in respect of assault.

====== Death ======
In R v Peverett, the accused and one "S," at the latter's suggestion, decided to commit suicide by introducing into a closed motor car poisonous fumes from the exhaust pipe of the car. The accused made the necessary arrangements. He and "S" then sat in the car; the accused started the engine. They both lost consciousness but were later removed from the car and eventually recovered. The accused was convicted of attempted murder; his appeal was dismissed. The court held that the fact that "S" was free to breathe the poisonous gas or not, as she pleased, did not free the accused from criminal responsibility for his acts. The accused had contemplated and expected that, as a consequence of his acts, "S" would die; he therefore intended to kill her, however little he may have desired her death.

In determining legal liability for terminating a patient's life, in Clarke v Hurst, the court held that there is no justification for drawing a distinction between

- an omission to institute artificial life-sustaining procedures; and
- the discontinuance of such procedures once they have been instituted.

Just as, in the case of an omission to institute life-sustaining procedures, legal liability would depend on whether there was a duty to institute them, so in the case of their discontinuance liability would depend on whether or not there was a duty not to discontinue such procedures once they have been instituted. A duty not to discontinue life-sustaining procedures cannot arise if the procedures instituted have proved to be unsuccessful. The maintenance of life in the form of certain biological functions, such as the heartbeat, respiration, digestion and blood circulation, but unaccompanied by any cortical and cerebral functioning of the brain, cannot be equated with "living" in the human or animal context. If the resuscitative measures were successful in restoring only these biological functions, they were in reality unsuccessful. Artificial measures, such as naso-gastric feeding, could consequently also be discontinued. It is appropriate in cases of this nature, and not in conflict with public policy, to make an evaluation of the quality of life remaining to the patient and to decide on that basis whether life-sustaining measures ought to be taken or continued.

====== Bodily harm ======
A participant in sport may validly consent only to those injuries which are normally to be expected in that particular sport. Voluntary participation in sport may also imply that the participant consents to injuries sustained as a result of acts which contravene the rules of the game—but only if such incidents are normally to be expected in that particular game.

Injuries inflicted in the course of initiation or religious ceremonies may be justified by consent only if they are of a relatively minor nature and do not conflict with generally accepted concepts of morality.

Sexual assault may be committed with or without the use of force or the infliction of injuries. Consent may operate as a justification for the act if no injuries are inflicted. Where injuries are inflicted, it has been held that consent may not be pleaded as a defence. Snyman has averred, however, that in such cases it would "seem to be more realistic" to enquire into whether the act is contra bonos mores or not. If the injury is slight, it is conceivable that the law may recognise consent to the act as a defence.

===== Real, voluntarily and without coercion =====
Where consent is obtained by means of fraud or deception, it is not genuine consent. Fraud or deception may take the form

- of actively misleading the other person as to the nature, circumstances or consequences of the act to which he is consenting; or
- of intentionally withholding information that is material to the other person's decision.

However, not all forms of fraud or deception will necessarily vitiate consent. Essentially, fraud or deception will only vitiate consent if it is material in nature: in other words, if the complainant would not have consented at all if he had known the truth, or would only have consented on substantially different terms.

In the case of sexual acts, it has long been the accepted rule that consent will only be vitiated by a fraud or deception that induces either error in negotio or error in personae:

- An error in negotio is an error in respect of the act.
- An error in personae is an error as to the identification of the other person.

===== Capable of consent =====
To consent to an otherwise unlawful act, the person consenting must have the ability to understand the nature of the act and to appreciate its consequences. This ability may be lacking due to

- youth;
- a mental defect; or
- intoxication, unconsciousness, etc.

==== Disciplinary chastisement ====
In Du Preez v Conradie, the court held that a parent has the right and the power to chastise minor children. This includes the right to impose moderate and reasonable corporal punishment. A step-parent (to whom a divorced parent of the children is married) may exercise the same rights if requested to do so by the other parent, subject to the same limitations as on that parent. The parent and step-parent are not entitled to molest their children or to exceed the bounds of moderate and reasonable chastisement.

Section 35(1) of the Interim Constitution provides expressly that the rights entrenched in it, including section 10—"every person shall have the right to respect for and protection of his or her dignity"—and section 11(2)—no "person shall be subject to torture of any kind, whether physical, mental or emotional, nor shall any person be subject to cruel, inhuman or degrading treatment or punishment"—shall be interpreted in accordance with the values which underlie an open and democratic society based on freedom and equality. In determining, then, whether punishment is cruel, inhuman or degrading within the meaning of the Constitution, the punishment in question must be assessed in the light of the values which underlie the Constitution. The simple message to be taken from this, according to the Constitutional Court, in S v Williams, is that the State, in imposing punishment, must do so in accordance with certain standards; these will reflect the values which underpin the Constitution. In the present context, this means that punishment must respect human dignity and be consistent with the provisions of the Constitution. The caning of juveniles in casu was accordingly ruled unconstitutional.

The Abolition of Corporal Punishment Act abolished judicial corporal punishment. The South African Schools Act abolished corporal punishment in schools. In Christian Education v Minister of Education, a private Christian organisation administered a private school and believed that, in terms of its Christian principles, the physical chastisement of children at school was lawful. The organisation applied for an order exempting the school from section 10 of the Schools Act, arguing that the constitutional right to religious freedom allowed it to be so exempted. The Constitutional Court held that the requested order could not be granted. Even if one assumed that section 10 infringed upon parents' right to religious freedom, such infringement was justified, since even private schools exercise their functions for the benefit of the public interest.

===== Requirements =====
The requirements for the lawful parental chastisement of children are laid out R v Janke & Janke. It must be

- moderate and reasonable;
- in a manner not offensive to good morals; and
- not for other objects than correction and admonition.

===== Considerations =====
Relevant considerations in adjudicating on the chastisement of children were laid out in Du Preez v Conradie:

- the nature of the offence;
- the condition of the child;
- the motive;
- the severity of the punishment;
- the object used to inflict the punishment;
- the age of the child;
- the sex of the child; and
- the build of the child.

=== Culpability ===
The test for determining criminal capacity is whether the accused had

- the ability to appreciate the wrongfulness of his conduct; and
- the ability to act in accordance with that appreciation.

A defence in this area may relate to

- biological (pathological) factors, like
  - immature age; and
  - mental illness; or
- non-pathological factors, like
  - intoxication;
  - provocation; and
  - emotional stress.

==== Biological factors ====
===== Youth =====
====== Common law ======
The common-law position is that a minor

- under seven years of age is irrefutably presumed to lack criminal capacity, being doli incapax;
- of seven to fourteen years of age is rebuttably presumed to lack criminal capacity; and
- over fourteen years enjoys the same criminal capacity as adults, without any presumption of a lack of capacity.

In R v K, a charge of murder was brought against a child of thirteen. The presumption, which applies for adults, that he had intended the probable consequences of his actions was not here applicable. The State failed to prove that the child knew that his act (stabbing and thereby killing his mentally ill mother) was unlawful.

In Director of Public Prosecutions, KZN v P, the respondent, a fourteen-year-old girl, had been convicted of the murder of her grandmother. The passing of sentence was postponed for a period of 36 months, on the condition that the respondent complied with the conditions of a sentence of 36 months' correctional supervision in terms of section 276(1)(h) of the Criminal Procedure Act. On appeal, the State argued that the sentence was too lenient, considering the gravity of the offence. It contended that, despite the young age of the respondent, direct imprisonment should have been imposed.

The test for interference by an appeal court is whether the sentence imposed by the trial court is vitiated by irregularity or misdirection or is disturbingly inappropriate. The strongest mitigating factor in favour of the respondent in casu was her youthfulness: She had been twelve years and five months old at the time of the offence. A second factor was that she had no previous conviction. The aggravating factors, however, were overwhelming. The postponement of the passing of sentence was therefore inappropriate in the circumstances, and caused a sense of shock and a feeling that justice was not done.

====== Child Justice Act ======
The Child Justice Act was assented to on 7 May 2009, and commenced on 1 April 2010. Among the purposes of the Act is

- to provide for the minimum age of criminal capacity of children; and
- to provide a mechanism for dealing with children who lack criminal capacity outside the criminal justice system.

Part 2 of the Act deals with the criminal capacity of children under the age of fourteen years.

In terms of section 7, dealing with the minimum age of criminal capacity,

- a child who commits an offence while under the age of ten years does not have criminal capacity and cannot be prosecuted for that offence, but must be dealt with in terms of section 9, so there is an irrebuttable presumption that the child lacks capacity;
- a child who is ten years or older, but under the age of fourteen years, and commits an offence, is presumed to lack criminal capacity, unless the State proves that he or she has criminal capacity in accordance with section 11, so there is a rebuttable presumption of lack of capacity.

The common law pertaining to the criminal capacity of children under the age of fourteen years was thereby amended.

In terms of section 11, dealing with proof of criminal capacity, the State must prove, beyond reasonable doubt, that a child who is ten years or older, but under the age of fourteen years, had the capacity

- to appreciate the difference between right and wrong at the time of the commission of an alleged offence; and
- to act in accordance with that appreciation.

Section 8 provides for review of the minimum age of criminal capacity:

In order to determine whether or not the minimum age of criminal capacity as set out in section 7(1) should be raised, the Cabinet member responsible for the administration of justice must, not later than five years after the commencement of this section, submit a report to Parliament.

Section 9 deals with the manner of dealing with a child under the age of ten years.

===== Mental incapacity =====
Until 1977, the "defence of insanity" had its roots in English law, in particular the M'Naghten rules.

The CPA replaced these, however, with sections 77 to 79, which were implemented largely on the recommendation of the Rumpff Commission: Report of the Commission of Inquiry into the Responsibility of Mentally Deranged Persons & Related Matters.

There are two questions to consider in respect of mental incapacity:

1. Is the accused fit to stand trial? This is a preliminary issue.
2. Did the accused have the requisite capacity when he committed the unlawful act?

====== Test of insanity ======
The meaning or definition of "mental illness" or "mental defect" is provided in S v Stellmacher, discussed above. It is "a pathological disturbance of the accused's mental capacity, not a mere temporary mental confusion which is [...] attributable to [...] external stimuli such as alcohol, drugs or provocation."

An affliction or disturbance is pathological if it is the product of a disease.

The criterion in Stellmacher identifies as mental illnesses (as opposed to mental defects) only those disorders which are

1. pathological; and
2. endogenous.

To be endogenous is to be of internal origin.

Section 78(1) of the CPA provides that a person whose act or omission constitutes an offence, and who suffers at the time from a mental illness or defect which makes him incapable

- of appreciating the wrongfulness of his act or omission; or
- of acting in accordance with that appreciation,

will not be criminally responsible for that act or omission.

The difference between the first contingency and the second is between the cognitive and the conative respectively:

- The cognitive refers to insight, or appreciation of the wrongfulness of an act.
- The conative refers to self-control, or acting in accordance with an appreciation of that wrongfulness.

S v Mahlinza lays out the general principles relating to criminal capacity and mental illness. One night, the accused in casu, a devoted mother, had taken off her clothing and placed it on a fire. She had then placed her baby and her six-year-old daughter on the fire, and stood at the door of the kitchen to prevent them from escaping. The baby was burnt to death; the six-year-old escaped with burns. The psychiatrist who examined the accused reported that she was laughing and was generally very rowdy, and could not give an account of herself or of her behaviour; she was disorientated and had no insight into her condition. The psychiatrist diagnosed a state of hysterical dissociation. She was charged with murder but found to be insane, and thus not guilty.

Rumpff JA (of the eponymous report) held in Mahlinza that, whenever the issue of the accused's mental faculties is raised (be it in respect of the trial or in respect of her criminal capacity), an investigation into her mental faculties is of primary and decisive importance. Should the investigation show that she did not have criminal capacity, the necessity for an investigation as to fault in the technical sense, and as to the voluntariness with which the offence was committed, falls away. The decision in each case depends on the particular facts and the medical evidence. Rumpff warned that it is both impossible and dangerous to attempt to lay down any general symptoms by which a mental disorder may be recognised as a mental "disease" or "defect."

====== Types of mental disorders ======
Burchell lays out a number of types of mental disorder:

- organic disorders, which are due to a general medical condition, and which are pathological and endogenous, and which therefore satisfy the criteria of the legal definition of insanity;
- substance-related disorders, which are not necessarily pathological, endogenous or permanent, so that persons suffering from them are not necessarily legally insane;
- schizophrenia and other psychotic disorders, which are pathological, endogenous and capable of depriving the sufferer of insight or self-control, and which therefore satisfy the criteria of the legal definition of insanity;
- personality disorders, which are a consequence not of disturbance of the psychic state, but rather of patterns of behaviour learned during the formative years; and
- mood and anxiety disorders:
  - Mood disorders are capable of depriving the sufferer of insight or self-control, and may therefore satisfy the criteria of the legal definition of insanity.
  - Anxiety disorders do not affect one's ability to distinguish reality from unreality, and therefore are not psychotic in nature. Dissociative orders, however, may deprive the sufferer of insight or self-control, and therefore may satisfy the criteria of the legal definition of insanity.

The Interim Report of the Booysen Commission of Enquiry into the Continued Inclusion of Psychopathy as Certifiable Mental Illness and the Dealing with Psychopathic and Other Violent Offenders found that the "retention of psychopathy as a mental illness in the Mental Health Act is not only scientifically untenable, but it is also not effective in practice."

In accordance with the recommendations of the Commission, section 286A of the CPA now provides for the declaration of certain persons as dangerous criminals, and section 286B for the imprisonment, for an indefinite period, of such persons.

Even before the Booysen Commission, however, the courts were not prepared to accept psychopathy, in and of itself, as exempting an accused from criminal liability, or even as warranting a lesser sentence on account of diminished responsibility.

In S v Mnyanda, the accused was convicted of murder. In an appeal, he argued that his psychopathy should have been regarded as a mental illness, and thus as a mitigating factor. The court found that the mere fact that an accused may be regarded as clinically a psychopath is not a basis on which he may be found to have diminished responsibility. Only when, in respect of a particular misdeed, it can be said that the psychopathic tendency was of such a degree as to diminish the capacity for self-control to such a point that, according to a moral judgment, he is less blameworthy, will the law recognise his diminished responsibility.

====== Procedural aspects ======
Originally, South Africa followed English law, using the "guilty but insane" formula, but in 1977 the verdict was changed to "not guilty by reason of mental illness or mental defect." Section 78(8)(a) of the CPA allows an appeal against such a finding. Whether or not the verdict in insanity cases is tantamount to an acquittal, from which no appeal is allowed, and whether the State may appeal against a verdict of not guilty by reason of mental illness or defect—these conundrums have not yet been answered by the courts.

In the past, if a court found an accused to be "not guilty but insane," it had to "direct that the accused be detained in a mental hospital or prison pending the signification of the decision of a Judge in chambers." These provisions were regarded as peremptory; there was no option but to commit the accused to an institution. It is not difficult to see how the inevitable committal to an institution of a person who was found to be insane at the time of the offence, but who subsequently recovered, could lead to "great injustice."

In S v McBride, the accused had been capable of appreciating the wrongfulness of his act, but he was unable, because of "an endogenous depression" resulting in "impaired judgment," to act in accordance with that appreciation. The court held that he was not criminally responsible for the killing. Although the accused had since recovered from his illness, to the extent of obtaining employment and "performing a function as a useful member of society," the court considered itself bound to order his detention in a mental hospital.

In Burchell's words, then, "we have the curious contradiction that a sane person is detained in a mental institution (or a prison) because he committed a crime for which, in law, he is not responsible and has accordingly been found 'not guilty.'"

The South African Law Commission, recognising this injustice, proposed that such a person be committed to an institution only if he has not recovered or continues to pose a danger to himself or to society. The legislature addressed the issue with the Criminal Matters Amendment Act, giving the court a discretion, if "it considers it to be necessary in the public interest," in cases involving serious crimes, to order either detention in an institution, or release, conditional or unconditional.

Sections 46 to 48 of the Mental Health Care Act provide for periodic review of the mental-health status of State patients, application for their discharge and various provisions governing conditional discharge.

The range of orders that a judge may issue are set out in section 47(6):

- that the patient remain a State patient;
- that he be reclassified and dealt with as a voluntary, assisted or involuntary mental-health-care user;
- that he be discharged unconditionally; or
- that he be discharged conditionally.

====== Onus of proof ======
South African law has adopted English law on the onus of proof in these matters: "Every man is presumed to be sane, and to possess a sufficient degree of reason to be responsible for his crimes, until the contrary be proved." Section 78(1A) of the CPA reiterates that every person is presumed not to suffer from a mental illness or mental defect so as not to be criminally responsible in terms of section 78(1), until the contrary is proved on a balance of probabilities.

In terms of section 78(1B), whenever the criminal responsibility of an accused is in issue, with reference to a commission or omission which constitutes an offence, the burden of proof will be on the party who raises the issue.

Almost always, therefore, it will be on the accused.

In S v Kalogoropoulos, the court held that an accused person who relies on non-pathological causes in support of a defence of criminal incapacity is required in evidence to lay a factual foundation for it, sufficient at least to create a reasonable doubt on that point. It is, ultimately, for the court to decide the issue of the accused's criminal responsibility for his actions, having regard to the expert evidence and to all the facts of the case, including the nature of the accused's actions during the relevant period.

====== Diminished responsibility ======
Section 78(7) of the CPA provides that, if the court finds that the accused, at the time of the commission of the offence, was criminally responsible, but that his capacity to appreciate the wrongfulness of the act, or to act in accordance with an appreciation of that wrongfulness, was diminished by reason of mental illness or mental defect, the court may take that fact into account when sentencing him.

The accused acted with diminished responsibility in S v Mnisi. On seeing his wife in an adulterous embrace with the deceased, the accused had lost control of his inhibitions and shot him. On appeal, the SCA held that the trial court had not accorded sufficient weight to the accused's diminished criminal responsibility. The fact that he had acted with dolus indirectus had also not been taken into account. Deterrence was of lesser importance in this case, the SCA held, because the evidence did not suggest that the accused had a propensity for violence; he was unlikely to commit such an offence again. In view of the accused's diminished criminal responsibility, general deterrence was also of lesser importance. His sentence of eight years' imprisonment was reduced to five.

===== Non-pathological criminal incapacity =====
Non-pathological criminal incapacity must be distinguished from mental illness. A person may suffer from mental illness, and nevertheless be able to appreciate the wrongfulness of certain conduct, and to act in accordance with that appreciation.

====== Intoxication ======
Intoxication may affect

- the act (rendering the accused's conduct involuntary);
- capacity; or
- intention.

There are four types of intoxication:

1. involuntary intoxication;
2. intoxication leading to mental illness;
3. actio libera in causa; and
4. voluntary intoxication.

In R v Bourke, the accused was charged with rape; he was acquitted as a result of intoxication. The court noted three broad propositions in Roman-Dutch law:

1. "that, as a general rule, drunkenness is not an excuse for the commission of a crime, though it may be a reason for mitigation of punishment;"
2. that, "if the drunkenness is not voluntary, and is severe, it is an excuse;—that is, if the drunkenness was caused not by the act of the accused person but by that of another, and was such as to make him unconscious of what he was doing, then he would not be held in law responsible for any act done when in that state;" and
3. that, "if constant drunkenness has induced a state of mental disease, delirium tremens, so that, at the time the criminal act was done, the accused was insane, and therefore unconscious of his act, he is not responsible, but in such a case he can be declared insane."

The court held that absolute drunkenness is not equivalent to insanity. The essential difference is that the drunk person, as a rule, voluntarily induces his condition, whereas the mentally ill person is the victim of a disease: "It is therefore not unreasonable to consider that the person who voluntarily becomes drunk is responsible for all such acts as flow from his having taken an excess of liquor."

"To allow drunkenness to be pleaded as an excuse," wrote Wessels J, "would lead to a state of affairs repulsive to the community. It would follow that the regular drunkard would be more immune from punishment than the sober man." For another case, see S v B.

In S v Johnson, the leading decision on intoxication prior to S v Chretien, an accused was found guilty of culpable homicide despite the fact that the court accepted the psychiatric evidence that the accused was so drunk that he did not know what he was doing at the time of the offence. This case therefore reaffirmed the principle in Bourke that voluntary drunkenness is no excuse.

In Chetrien, the Appellate Division reconsidered Bourke and Johnson, and eradicated the traditional approach to voluntary intoxication. It firmly adopted a course based on legal principle. The facts were these: While under the influence of alcohol, Chetrien had driven his car into a crowd of people standing in the street. One was killed; five were injured. On charges of murder and attempted murder, the trial court found the accused guilty of culpable homicide, but acquitted him of attempted murder.

The issue on appeal was whether, on the facts, the trial judge, Friedman J, had been correct in law to hold that the accused, on a charge of attempted murder, could not be convicted of common assault where the necessary intention for the offence had been influenced by the voluntary consumption of liquor. Friedman J had accepted that, in his drunken state, the accused had expected that the people would move out of his way. There was some doubt, therefore, as to whether he had the requisite intention for common assault. Friedman J found that he was bound by Johnson. By confining that decision to the issue of culpable homicide, however, and by categorising common assault as a crime requiring "specific intent," he was able to avoid the effect of Johnson in respect of non-specific-intent crimes. Friedman J thus brought to issue the question of whether, subjectively, the accused had the requisite intention for common assault of the five injured persons.

The State's argument was that the trial court should have applied Johnson and found the accused guilty of common assault, even if he lacked mens rea on account of his intoxication. The majority of the Appellate Division concluded that even common assault requires intention to assault. If this intention is lacking due to voluntary intoxication, there can be no conviction. It was found that Chetrien had had no such intention. Rumpff CJ held that the rule in Johnson was juridically impure, and that voluntary intoxication could be a complete defence to criminal liability. Rumpff stressed the importance of the degree of the accused's intoxication:

- At one extreme is the person who is "dead drunk."
- At the other is the person who is only slightly drunk.

The latter would have no defence; the former would be acquitted if he was so drunk that his conduct was involuntary, making him unable to distinguish right from wrong, or unable to act in accordance with that appreciation.

Voluntary intoxication was thus removed from the direct influence of policy considerations, and placed firmly on the basis of legal principle. The result is that it can now affect criminal liability in the same way, and to the same extent, as youth, insanity, involuntary intoxication and provocation. Intoxication of a sufficient degree, therefore, can serve to exclude the voluntariness of conduct, criminal capacity or intention.

"While Chetrien cannot be faulted on grounds of logic or conformity with general principles," writes Burchell, "the judgment might well have miscalculated the community's attitude to intoxication. Should a person who commits a prohibited act while extremely intoxicated escape all criminal liability?" In 1982, the Minister of Justice requested the Law Commission to consider the matter. In January 1986, after receiving extensive comment on a working paper, the Commission published a report and a draft Bill. Eventually the Criminal Law Amendment Bill was tabled in Parliament. After its passage, it came into operation on 4 March 1988. The Act contains two short sections, the first of which provides that

any person who consumes or uses any substance which impairs his or her faculties to appreciate the wrongfulness of his or her acts or to act in accordance with that appreciation, while knowing that such substance has that effect, and who [...] thus impaired commits any act prohibited by law [...], but is not criminally liable because his or her faculties were impaired [...], shall be guilty of an offence and shall be liable on conviction to the penalty [...] which may be imposed in respect of the commission of that act.

The elements of the offence of contravening the Act are as follows:

- consumption or use of any intoxicating substance by the accused;
- impairment of the accused's faculties (to appreciate the wrongfulness of the act or to act in accordance with that appreciation) as a result of the consumption or use;
- knowledge that the substance has the effect of impairing his faculties;
- commission by the accused of any act prohibited by law while his faculties are so impaired; and
- absence of criminal liability because his faculties are so impaired.

There are two main components:

1. requirements relating to the consumption of the substance; and
2. circumstances surrounding the commission of the act.

In S v Vika, the appellant was convicted in a regional court on two counts of contravening this section. The prohibited acts were murder and attempted murder. Regarding the appropriate punishment, the magistrate applied the provision that such a contravention could attract the same penalty as that which might be imposed for the unlawful act itself. He found that no substantial and compelling circumstances existed to justify a sentence of less than the fifteen years' imprisonment stipulated in section 51(2) of the Criminal Law Amendment Act.

When the appellant appealed against the sentence, arguing that it was startlingly inappropriate, the High Court held that the magistrate seemed not to have appreciated the difference between the offences of which the appellant had been convicted, and the offences of murder and attempted murder. These amounted to misdirections, and entitled the court to interfere with the sentence. The appeal was thus upheld, the sentence of fifteen years' imprisonment set aside and a sentence of seven years' and four years' imprisonment, running concurrently, imposed.

It is important to remember, therefore, that to be convicted of an offence in terms of section 1(1) of the Criminal Law Amendment Act is to be convicted of a unique statutory offence, described in detail above, and not of the ordinary common-law offence.

Section 1(2) of the Criminal Law Amendment Act provides that, if in any prosecution of any offence it is found that the accused is not criminally liable, because his faculties were impaired by the consumption or use of any substance, he "may be found guilty of a contravention of subsection (1), if the evidence proves the commission of such contravention." This subsection provides, in essence, that a contravention of section 1(1) will be regarded as a competent verdict on a charge of another offence.

Section 2 of the Act provides that, whenever it is proved that the faculties of a person were impaired by the consumption or use of a substance when he committed an offence, the court may, in determining an appropriate sentence, regard as an aggravating circumstance the fact that his faculties were so impaired. The Law Commission was not in favour of this provision. As Burchell points out, "a court always has a discretion to impose an appropriate punishment and intoxication can be taken into account either as a mitigating or as an aggravating circumstance." The section does indicate, with the word "may," that the court retains its discretion, but Burchell thinks this superfluous.

Section 1(1) does not specify voluntary consumption. The Bill drafted by the Law Commission did, however, and therefore would have protected from a liability a person who has his drink "spiked" by another. Under the Act, such a person would escape liability on the basis that he did not know that the substance he was drinking would have the effect it did. The Law Commission's Bill, however, has "the advantage of also clearly leading to the acquittal of a person who was forced to drink an alcoholic or other concoction, which he knew would have the effect of impairing his faculties, but who had no control over his actions." Burchell suggests that the courts "interpret the words 'consumes or uses' as implying conduct directed by the consumer's or user's will and therefore importing voluntary intoxication".

Another problem is that the Act refers only to a lack of criminal capacity. What about involuntary conduct and intention? "The wording of the draft bill prepared by the Law Commission," writes Burchell, "is surely preferable," since it refers simply to an impairment of "mental faculties," without any restriction as to the consequence of this impairment. Chetrien had criminal capacity, but he was acquitted on the ground that there was reasonable doubt as to whether he possessed the requisite intention to commit the crimes wherewith he was charged. He would also escape liability under the Act, because his intoxication did not lead to lack of criminal capacity, but rather to lack of mens rea.

There is, finally, a problem in respect of onus. According to general principles, the burden of proving the presence of all the elements of the crime, beyond reasonable doubt, rests on the State. One of the elements that the State must prove beyond reasonable doubt, for a contravention of section 1(1), is that the accused is not criminally liable for his act, committed while intoxicated, "because his faculties were impaired," or better say because he lacked capacity at the time he committed the act. "This," as Snyman points out, "leads to the unusual situation that, in order to secure a conviction of contravening this section, the state must do that which X [the accused] normally does at a trial, namely try and persuade the court that X is not guilty of a crime. The state thus bears the burden of proving the opposite of what it normally has to prove."

The problem in practical terms, Snyman observes, is that "it is difficult for the state to prove beyond reasonable doubt that because of incapacity resulting from intoxication, X cannot be held criminally liable for his act." The courts have warned on multiple occasions that they will not easily conclude that the accused lacked capacity.

The difficulty arises when the two offences are used in the alternative. Snyman posits the following:

If X is charged with assault and the evidence shows that he was only slightly drunk at the time of the act, he will not escape the clutches of the criminal law, because he will then be convicted of assault and the only role the intoxication will play will be to serve as a ground for the mitigation of punishment. If the evidence shows that at the time of the act he was very drunk [...], so drunk that he lacked capacity, he would likewise not escape the clutches of criminal law, because he would then be convicted of contravening this section. However, if the evidence reveals that at the time of the act he happened to fall into the grey area between 'slightly drunk' and very drunk', he will completely escape the clutches of criminal law; he will then 'fall' between the proverbial 'two chairs' and it would then be impossible to convict him of any crime. In this way the section could undoubtedly lose much of its effectiveness.

In S v Mbele, the accused was charged with theft in a magistrate's court. He contended that he had been under the influence of alcohol at the time of the offence; the State witness testified to the effect that he was "not quite all there." The magistrate could not find on the evidence that the accused had the necessary criminal responsibility, and gave him the benefit of the doubt that his version could possibly be true. Since he was "not criminally liable" for the crime, the magistrate found him guilty of a contravention of section 1(1) of the Criminal Law Amendment Act. On review, the Witwatersrand Local Division held that, for a contravention of section 1(1), the State was required to prove that the accused's faculties were impaired at the time he performed the act, and that, as a result, he was not criminally liable. It was insufficient, therefore, for the State to take matters only so far as uncertainty as to whether his faculties were impaired to the necessary degree. The court found that the State had not proven impairment of the accused's faculties. He could not be convicted, therefore, of the offence of contravening section 1(1). The conviction and sentence were accordingly set aside.

In S v September, the appellant stood trial in a Provincial Division on charges of murder, assault with intent to do grievous bodily harm, theft and malicious injury to property. The trial court found

- that, at the time of the commission of the offences, the appellant had been under the influence of liquor, and possibly also drugs;
- that he had consequently lacked criminal capacity; and
- that he was guilty, accordingly, of a contravention of section 1(1) of the Criminal Law Amendment Act.

On appeal, the appellant argued that the evidence was indeed of such a nature as to cast doubt on his criminal capacity, and that the trial court had correctly found that he could not be convicted of the charges laid against him. It was, however, further argued that positive proof was absent of a lack of criminal capacity, and that the appellant ought accordingly not to have been convicted on section 1(1). The court stressed the fact that it was the task of the trial court, in every case, to decide whether the accused indeed lacked the requisite criminal capacity. Three psychiatrists had testified as to the appellant's alleged state of intoxication. They differed widely in their opinions. The trial court had accepted, without furnishing reasons for so doing, the evidence of the psychiatrist whose opinion it was that the appellant had lacked criminal capacity. This indicated that the trial court had not examined the question of the appellant's criminal capacity to the requisite extent. The evidence as a whole, therefore, had to be assessed anew. After reassessing the evidence, the court found that no reasonable doubt had been cast on the appellant's criminal capacity. The evidence was furthermore sufficient to lead to the conclusion that the appellant, beyond reasonable doubt, was guilty of contravening the original counts. The court therefore set aside the convictions on section 1(1), and substituted convictions on the original charges.

====== Provocation and emotional stress ======
Provocation may be a complete defence in South African law, and may exclude:

- the voluntariness of conduct, although this is very rare;
- criminal capacity; or
- intention.

Roman and Roman-Dutch law did not regard anger, jealousy or other emotions as defences for any criminal conduct; they were only factors in mitigation of sentence, and even then only if they could be justified by provocation.

Section 141 of the Transkei Penal Code of 1886 influenced the adoption by the courts of the view that provocation could never be a never be a complete defence to a charge of murder; at most it could be a partial defence. The Code provided that killing which would otherwise have constituted murder could be reduced to culpable homicide if the person responsible acted in the heat of the moment, as a result of passion occasioned by sudden provocation. The decision to reduce a charge of murder to one of culpable homicide depended on an application of the criterion of the ordinary person's power of self-control; the test was objective, in other words.

S v Mokonto saw a change from the objective to a subjective test. The accused believed that the death of his two brothers had been brought about by the evil powers of a witch. When he confronted her, she declared that he would not "see the setting of the sun today," whereupon he struck her with a cane-knife, almost cutting off her head. He was convicted of murder. On appeal, Holmes JA held that he had been provoked to anger by the deceased's threat, and that, therefore, the appropriate verdict should be one of culpable homicide. Holmes considered section 141 of the Transkeian Code, with its provision that "homicide which would otherwise be murder may be reduced to culpable homicide, if the person who causes death does so in the heat of passion caused by sudden provocation." The Code continues,

Any wrongful act of such a nature as to be sufficient to deprive any ordinary person of the power of self-control may be provocation, if the offender acts upon it on the sudden, and before there has been time for his passion to cool.

This did not correlate, Holmes found, with the Roman-Dutch notion that provocation is not a defence. Holmes held that the objective "reasonable person" criterion is not in harmony with modern subjective judicial thinking. It is judicially recognised that intention to kill is purely a subjective matter. Since the test of criminal intention was now subjective, and since earlier cases of provocation applied a degree of objectivity, it might be necessary, he thought, to consider afresh the whole question of provocation. On the other hand, he noted, the facts of a particular case might show that the provocation, far from negativing an intention to kill, had actually caused it. The crime would then be murder, not culpable homicide.

The test for intention being subjective, it seemed to Holmes that provocation, which bears upon intention, must also be judged subjectively. In crimes of which specific intention is an element, therefore, the question of the existence of such intention is a subjective one: What was going on in the mind of the accused? Provocation, Holmes held, is relevant to the question of the existence of such intention. Subjectively considered, it is also relevant to mitigation.

S v Laubscher dealt with the defence of temporary non-pathological criminal incapacity. Laubscher, a medical student, shot and killed his father-in-law, and attempted also to shoot his mother-in-law and his estranged wife one day at his in-laws' home. He was charged with and convicted of murder and attempted murder. His defence was that he had acted involuntarily, since he had lacked criminal capacity at the time of the commission. This was due to a total but temporary "psychological breakdown," or temporary "disintegration of his personality." In order to address the issue of the appellant's mental faculties at the time of the crime, the court had to look at the role of the defence in South African law. To be criminally liable, a perpetrator must, at the time of the commission of the alleged offence, have criminal liability. The doctrine of criminal capacity is an independent subdivision of the concept of mens rea. Therefore, to be criminally liable, a perpetrator's mental faculties must be such that he is legally to blame for his conduct.

The court set out the two psychological characteristics of criminal capacity:

1. the ability to distinguish right from wrong, and to appreciate the wrongfulness of an act;
2. the capacity to act in accordance with that appreciation, and to refrain from acting unlawfully.

In the present case, the defence was one of non-pathological incapacity. Where a defence of non-pathological incapacity succeeds, the accused is not criminally liable; he may not be convicted of the alleged offence. He must be acquitted. Because he does not suffer from a mental illness, or from a defect of a pathological nature, he may not be declared a State patient either.

Laubscher had experienced a considerable amount of stress in the period leading up to the incident. He was an emotionally sensitive 23-year-old with the intelligence of a genius. He and his wife had married young, when she was pregnant, and had struggled financially; he was still a student. Her parents had contributed R80 per month toward their rent, and had taken every opportunity thus afforded them to meddle in the couple's affairs. Laubscher and his parents-in-law did not get along; he feared his father-in-law. Nor did things improve when the baby was born.

The parents took his wife to their farm and made arrangements, without the appellant's consent, to christen the baby. The wife did not return to the appellant afterwards—nor did the baby—and, upon reaching majority, began to institute divorce proceedings. One weekend, the appellant made arrangements with his wife to go away to his parents' home for the weekend with the child, and to some spend time together. She agreed. When he arrived at the farm to pick them up, however, she had apparently changed her mind, so he made arrangements to see his family the following week.

The appellant travelled with a loaded gun, since he was driving alone. He arrived at the farm to be told, again, that he would not be leaving with his wife and child. He went to a hotel, checked in, misspelled his name and other words on the necessary forms, and did not have dinner, although he did have a rum and coke. He went back his in-laws' house and demanded to see his child. His mother-in-law told him he could not. The appellant could recollect nothing after this point. He was woken up the following morning in hospital, with no recollection of what he had done.

The appeal court agreed with the convictions on the first four counts. The defence of involuntary conduct (owing to psychological breakdown or disintegration of personality) had to fail, because Laubscher's behaviour, according to his own version of events, did not support such a finding. His actions were goal-directed and purposeful—before, during and after the shooting. Altogether he had fired some 21 shots into various rooms of the house, requiring him to reload his gun at least twice. He had also managed to drive away from the house immediately afterwards, in an attempt to escape. This was not consistent with automatic behaviour. The trial court's conviction was accordingly upheld. It was in Laubscher that the court first adopted the term "temporary non-pathological criminal incapacity," using it to distinguish between lack of criminal capacity due to mental illness or defect, and lack of criminal capacity due to other factors, such as intoxication, provocation and severe emotional stress.

As to the fifth count (attempted murder), the court held that the State had not proven beyond a reasonable doubt that Laubscher had the necessary intention, in the form of dolus eventualis, to kill his child—especially in view of the fact that the whole object of his visit to the farm that evening had been to collect his child. As regards sentence, the court held that the appellant had without doubt been suffering from severe stress, and so his sentence was mitigated.

The defence of psychogenic sane automatism was first raised successfully in the Cape Provincial Division, in S v Arnold, where Arnold had shot and killed his wife, Tina, one day at their home. At his trial for murder, it emerged that, like Laubscher, he had been under severe emotional stress at the time of the incident. Apart from long-standing financial and marital problems, he was deeply distressed at parting from his disabled son, whom he had just delivered to a children's home. He had placed the boy there at Tina's insistence. Having taken a gun with him for protection, he returned home and went into the living room to put it away. Tina was in the living room; an argument broke out between them. At one point, Arnold banged his gun on the back of the sofa. It went off accidentally, but no-one was harmed. Tina informed Arnold that she wished to resume her former occupation as a stripper, and bared her breasts to him. At this, he fired upon and killed her. He claimed later that he had no recollection of aiming and pulling the trigger. The psychiatrist who gave evidence for the defence testified that, at the time of the shooting, Arnold's "conscious mind was so 'flooded' by emotions that it interfered with his capacity to appreciate what was right or wrong and, because of his emotional state, he may have lost the capacity to exercise control over his actions." The court, however, identified the legal issues in dispute as follows:

- Did Arnold perform an act in the legal sense? In other words, was his conduct voluntary?
- If so, did he have the necessary criminal capacity at the time?
- If so, did he have the required intention to commit murder?

In answer to these questions, the court held that it was not satisfied that the State had passed the first hurdle: It had failed to prove, beyond a reasonable doubt, that Arnold's conduct was voluntary. Even if it had, though, the court was not satisfied that the State had proved beyond a reasonable doubt that Arnold had criminal capacity at the relevant time. He was therefore acquitted.

After Arnold, there were a number of murder trials in which the accused claimed that he, too, had acted involuntarily or had lacked criminal capacity as a result of severe emotional stress, coupled with provocation. Although the defence enjoyed a measure of temporary success in the then-Supreme Court, there has thus far been only one case in which it has succeeded in the Appellate Division or in the Supreme Court of Appeal: that of S v Wiid. The accused was also acquitted in the lower court in S v Nursingh and S v Moses.

S v Campher, together with Wiid, makes it clear that provocation may exclude not only the accused's intention to murder, but in certain extreme cases also his criminal capacity. In S v Potgieter, the Appellate Division cautioned that, if the accused's version of events is unreliable, the psychiatric or psychological evidence adduced in favour of the defence of non-pathological incapacity (inevitably based on the accused's version of events) would also be of doubtful validity.

For a long time it was unclear that the defence of temporary non-pathological criminal incapacity was at all different from the defence of sane automatism, and (if so) what the difference was. This question was finally resolved by the SCA in S v Eadie. Eadie had battered a fellow motorist to death with a broken hockey stick in a fit of purported road rage. He had been drinking heavily. He raised the defence of temporary non-pathological criminal incapacity, but this defence was rejected. On conviction, he appealed to the SCA. In a judgment "long and very thorough," Navsa JA comprehensively reviewed the jurisprudence on provocation and emotional stress, and the historical development of the defences of temporary non-pathological criminal incapacity and sane automatism. He concluded that they are one and the same thing. He went on to hold that a normal person can only lack self-control, and hence criminal capacity, if he is acting in a state of automatism. He also indicated that, although the test of capacity might still remain, in principle, essentially subjective, the application of this test is to be approached with caution. The courts must not too readily accept the ipse dixit of the accused regarding provocation or emotional stress. A court is entitled to draw a legitimate inference from what "hundreds of thousands" of other people would have done under the same circumstances: that is, by looking at the objective circumstances. Drawing such an inference could result in the court's disbelieving an accused who says simply, without adducing any further evidence, that he lacked capacity or acted involuntarily under provocation or emotional stress.

Eadie thus affirmed the High Court's finding that the accused could not successfully raise the defence of non-pathological incapacity on the facts. Both the High Court and the Supreme Court of Appeal drew a pragmatic distinction between loss of control and loss of temper. Eadie

signals a warning that in future the defence of non-pathological incapacity will be scrutinised most carefully. Persons who may in the past have been acquitted in circumstances where they had killed someone who had insulted them will find that courts will scrupulously evaluate their ipse dixit in the context of objective standards of acceptable behaviour.

On this interpretation of Eadie, capacity remains subjectively tested in principle, but the practical implementation of the test must accommodate the reality that the policy of the law, with regard to provoked killings, "must be one of reasonable restraint." It may, writes Burchell,

be difficult for the courts in future not to blur the subtle distinction between, on the one hand, drawing legitimate inferences of individual subjective capacity from objective, general patterns of behaviour, and, on the other hand, judicially converting the current subjective criterion for judging capacity into an objective one.

It is possible to place a more radical interpretation on the judgment of Navsa JA in Eadie—not just as emphasising the court's ability to draw legitimate inferences as to capacity from objective circumstances, but as going further and explicitly requiring the defence of provocation to result in automatism and changing the essence of the test from a subjective to an objective inquiry.

"However," writes Burchell,

the court would neither simply have overturned, by implication, a considerable body of judicial precedent on the nature of capacity nor would it have reached a sweeping conclusion that could possibly alter other aspects of the law where the test of capacity is in issue, without full argument on these issues. Rather than suggesting that the Court replaced the subjective inquiry into capacity with an objective evaluation it is possible to suggest an interpretation of the Eadie case that involves a middle course: Capacity should be both subjectively and objectively assessed.

In the subsequent case of S v Marx, the court held that the binding effect of Eadie was to conflate sane automatism and non-pathological incapacity, "because a person who is deprived of self-control is both incapable of a voluntary act and at the same time lacks criminal capacity."

Shannon Hoctor has bemoaned Eadie's "potentially ruinous effect on the concept of non-pathological incapacity," and hopes that the judgment will be ignored by the courts, becoming "a derelict on the waters of the law," although he concedes that this is unlikely "in the light of courts such as the Eastern Cape High Court in Marx increasingly giving effect to the inevitable doctrinal aftermath [.... M]ere passivity will not be enough. Strong judicial action is required."

=== Fault (mens rea) ===
Fault is an element of every crime. It may take one of two forms: • intention (dolus); or • negligence (culpa).

All common-law crimes require intention (except for culpable homicide and contempt of court committed by an editor of a newspaper for which negligence is sufficient). Statutory crimes require either intention or negligence. Fault refers to the legal blameworthiness of the reprehensible state of mind or careless conduct of a criminally accountable person who has acted unlawfully.

It is a firmly established principle of criminal justice that there can be no liability without fault, a principle generally expressed in the maxim actus non facit reum, nisi mens sit rea (the act is not wrongful unless the mind is guilty). In other words, the general rule is that, in order for an accused to be held liable, in addition to unlawful conduct (or actus reus) and capacity, there must be fault (or mens rea) on the part of the accused. The requirement of fault as an element of liability means, among other things, that fault must exist in respect of each and every element of the crime with which the accused has been charged. This is so whether fault is in the form of intention or of negligence. The only exception to the rule is where the Legislature expressly provides that fault need not exist in respect of each element of a crime but, even in this eventuality, there is a presumption of statutory interpretation that the Legislature intended some form of fault to be required. Murder, by way of illustration, is the unlawful, intentional killing of a human being. In terms of the rule, a person who kills another will be guilty only if he knows or at least foresees the possibility that what he has done is unlawfully to kill a human being. Fault must exist in respect of each of the elements of the crime; if it is absent for any one of them (as where the killer believes he is acting lawfully, or does not know or foresee that death will be the consequence of his conduct, or does not know or foresee that what he is killing is a human being), there can be no fault. The accused must know, therefore, • that he may be acting unlawfully; • that his actions may bring about a death; and • that it is a human being he is killing.

==== Intention ====
Intention, as a form of fault, has three principal elements:

1. a direction of the will towards performing the act;
2. knowledge of the definitional elements of the crime; and
3. knowledge of unlawfulness of the conduct.

Intention generally takes one of three forms:

1. dolus directus;
2. dolus indirectus; and
3. dolus eventualis.

These three forms of intention may be general (indeterminatus).

===== Dolus directus =====
Dolus directus, or direct intention, is intention in its ordinary grammatical sense: The accused meant to perpetrate the prohibited conduct, or to bring about the criminal consequence. In the easiest case, one who kills a relative in order to secure an inheritance does foresee the death of the victim and desires it as the objective of the action. This type of intention will be present where the accused's aim and object was to perpetrate the unlawful conduct or to cause the consequence, even though the chance of its resulting was small (e.g. the administration of a weak poison or a rock thrown from a bridge in direction of the person's car).

===== Dolus indirectus =====
Dolus indirectus, or indirect intention, exists where, although the unlawful conduct or consequence was not the accused's aim and object, he foresaw the unlawful conduct or consequence as certain, 'substantially certain', or 'virtually certain'.

For instance, the accused in R v Kewelram set fire to certain stock in a store. His objective was the destruction of the stock (dolus directus) in order to obtain the insurance money, but he foresaw the destruction of the store as a substantially certain, or inevitable, consequence of the burning of the stock (dolus indirectus).

===== Dolus eventualis =====
Dolus eventualis exists where the accused does not mean to bring about the unlawful circumstance, or cause the unlawful consequence which follows from his conduct, but foresees the possibility of the circumstance's existence or the consequence's ensuing, and nonetheless proceeds with his conduct. In brief, the accused directs his will towards an event or result, but foresees that, in so doing, he may cause another event to ensue. Nevertheless he proceeds with his conduct. Intention in this sense is sometimes called "legal intention."

The facts of R v Jolly provide a clear illustration of the meaning of dolus eventualis. The appellants had unlawfully and deliberately derailed a train. No-one was seriously injured. The appellants argued that there was no desire to injure anyone; they had chosen a spot where the train was moving slowly up a rising gradient with banks on either side of the line. Innes CJ held, despite this, that they had intended to kill:

Now the derailment of a train, even upon a slightly rising grade, must be attended by terrible possibilities of danger to those travelling upon it. Jolly recognised this, for he said in his evidence that he contemplated risk of life. But he and his associates were content to cause that risk in the interests of their larger design.

On Snyman's definition, there are two requirements for existence of dolus eventualis:

1. that the accused should subjectively foresee the possibility that, in striving towards his main aim, the unlawful act or result may ensue; and
2. "that he should reconcile himself to this possibility," or at least be reckless as to the possibility.

The first may be described as the cognitive part of the test; the second is the conative or volitional part.

====== Foreseeing the possibility ======
The first requirement deals with what the accused conceives to be the circumstances or possible consequences of his actions. There cannot be dolus eventualis if he does not envisage those circumstances or consequences. Dolus eventualis differs from dolus indirectus in that the accused foresees the prohibited result not as one which necessarily will flow from his act, but only as a possibility.

"In spite of an objective formulation of dolus eventualis in some earlier cases relating principally to the doctrine of common purpose," since the early 1950s the courts have favoured a subjective test for intention, which was ultimately adopted by the Appellate Division in R v Nsele. Since Nsele, the subjective test for criminal intention has been consistently applied by South African courts. It is now settled law that

intention, and more particularly dolus eventualis, cannot be established through the application of an objective criterion. It must be proved that the accused subjectively foresaw the possible occurrence of the consequence in question.

The subjective test takes account only of the state of mind of the accused, the issue being whether the accused himself foresaw the consequences of his act. The test may be satisfied by inferential reasoning: that is to say, if it can be reasoned that, in the particular circumstances, the accused "ought to have foreseen" the consequences, and thus "must have foreseen," and therefore, by inference, "did foresee" them.

In S v Sigwahla, Holmes JA expressed the degree of proof in the following terms:

Subjective foresight, like any other factual issue, may be proved by inference. To constitute proof beyond reasonable doubt the inference must be the only one which can reasonably be drawn. It cannot be so drawn if there is a reasonable possibility that subjectively the accused did not foresee, even if he ought reasonably to have done so, and even if he probably did do so.

The inference, then, must be the only one that can reasonably be drawn from the proved facts.

In S v Van Aardt, having regard to the "sustained" and "vicious" assault upon the deceased by the appellant, the SCA found that "the appellant subjectively foresaw the possibility of his conduct causing the death of the deceased and was plainly reckless as to such result ensuing." He was therefore guilty of murder on the basis of dolus eventualis. This finding rendered irrelevant the question of whether or not the appellant owed a duty to the deceased of obtaining medical assistance for him. In the court a quo, however, Pickering J had accepted "that the State was required to prove that the appellant subjectively foresaw the reasonable possibility that his failure to obtain medical assistance for the deceased would lead to the death of the deceased." "This," argues Shannon Hoctor, "is the correct approach, in that in the face of any possible interpretive confusion the interpretation most favourable to the accused should be adopted."

====== Degree of possibility ======
Some consequences of an action will certainly occur; others will probably occur; while it is only a possibility that yet another consequence may occur. The question to be considered is whether all consequences, however remote the possibility of their occurrence, may be said to have been intended, or whether there is some point, in the scale of probability, at which foresight ceases to qualify as intention.

"After some uncertainty in older cases," this question was settled in part by the decision of the Appellate Division in R v Horn. Prior to this case, it was unclear whether dolus eventualis required foresight on the part of the accused that the consequences in question would probably result from his act, or whether it was sufficient if he foresaw that the consequences might possibly result. The Appellate Division decided that realisation of the possibility of the consequences is sufficient for criminal intention.

In earlier cases, the test for liability had been stated to be whether or not the consequence was "likely" to occur. It was argued in Horn that "likely" "connotes a degree of probability, something more than a mere possibility." Since in this case the evidence showed that the risk of harming the deceased was "one chance in a thousand," and that the risk of killing her was "one chance in many thousands," counsel argued that in the circumstances a fatal wounding was not a likely or probable occurrence, and so could not be said to have been intended by the appellant. Having examined earlier cases, Beyers JA was sceptical of this contention, observing,

No doubt, an accused may, in appropriate circumstances, be heard to say "That which has happened was so improbable that I did not appreciate that there was a risk of it happening." But that is not to say that a person who does foresee a risk of death is entitled, because the risk is slight, to "take a chance" and, as it were, gamble with the life of another.

On this point, the judge went on:

It would be incongruous to limit a wrongdoer's constructive intent to cases where the result which he had foreseen was likely to cause death and not to infer such intent where the result he had foreseen was, although possible, not likely.

It is only in proving the wrongdoer's appreciation of death as a possible result that it becomes relevant whether death was "likely" for the more likely death was, the stronger is the inference that he in fact appreciated the risk to life.

In short, if the accused foresaw the consequences or circumstances in question not as a probable result of his act, but considered that there was even a possibility that they could result (and if he reconciled himself to this possibility), he will have had intention in the sense of dolus eventualis. On the other hand, if he did not actually foresee the possibility, but as a reasonable man ought to have foreseen it, he lacked intention; at most he was negligent.

The view that foresight of only the possibility of the consequences resulting from an accused's act is sufficient for dolus eventualis "can now be regarded as settled law."

The courts have usually spoken simply of foresight of "possibility," or of "risk," unqualified by any adjective. Given that foresight of a possibility will constitute intention in the form of dolus eventualis, does it follow, then, that even the most remote and unlikely possibility, if foreseen, must be taken to have been intended?

The Southern African courts waver between,

- on the one hand, recognising even foresight of a remote possibility as dolus eventualis; and,
- on the other, requiring foresight of a real (or reasonable) possibility.

A further possibility is that the distinction between real and remote possibility is not relevant to foresight, but rather to the enquiry into recklessness.

In S v De Bruyn, Holmes JA stated obiter that dolus eventualis is present if the accused "foresees the possibility, however remote, of his act resulting in death to another." Later in his judgment he added (also obiter), "If, under cross-examination, an accused were to admit that he foresaw the possibility of death, on the footing that anything is possible, that would contribute to a conviction of murder." In S v Beukes, in contrast, Van Heerden JA accepted that dolus eventualis would normally be present only where the accused foresaw the occurrence of the unlawful consequence or the existence of the unlawful circumstance as a "reasonable" possibility.

In S v Ngubane, Jansen JA stated,

In principle it should not matter in respect of dolus eventualis whether the agent foresees (subjectively) the possibility as strong or faint, as probable or improbable provided his state of mind in regard to that possibility is "consenting," "reconciling" or "taking [the foreseen possibility] into the bargain." However, the likelihood in the eyes of the agent of the possibility eventuating must obviously have a bearing on the question whether he did consent to that possibility.

According to Jansen JA, "if the agent persists in his conduct despite foreseeing such a consequence as a real or concrete possibility, the inference could well be drawn that he 'reconciled' himself to that consequence, that he was reckless of that consequence." Jansen JA states that it does not matter, in determining foresight, whether the accused foresaw a real or merely a remote possibility of a consequence or circumstance. The relevance of this distinction between real and remote possibility arises in determining whether the accused accepted the foreseen possibility into the bargain.

====== Correlation between foreseen and actual manner of consequence occurring ======
Despite the views of certain South African writers, the Appellate Division in S v Goosen adopted the approach that has found favour among German criminal theorists: that the intention element (in consequence crimes) is not satisfied if the consequence occurs in a manner that differs markedly from the way in which the accused foresaw the causal sequence.

In other words, for intention in the form of dolus eventualis to exist, there not only has to be at least foresight of the possibility of the consequence occurring, and not only must the accused proceed with his conduct despite such foresight, but there has to be a substantial correlation between the foreseen way in which the consequence might have occurred and the actual way in which it did.

The appellant in Goosen foresaw the gun held by another in the gang being discharged intentionally, but he did not foresee, or it was not proved beyond reasonable doubt that he did foresee, the gun going off involuntarily or accidentally.

Van Heerden JA, delivering the unanimous judgment of the Appellate Division in Goosen, took the view that statements by Rumpff JA in S v Masilela, and of Jansen JA in S v Daniels—to the effect that the accused's mistake as regards the actual way in which death occurs cannot avail him—must be confined to the factual situations in those cases: in particular to instances when there was dolus directus in regard to the causing of death.

Van Heerden JA took the approach that where the accused's aim and objective was to bring about the death of the deceased, in general his mistake as regards the actual way in which death occurs would be irrelevant. Van Heerden JA nevertheless accepted that, even where dolus directus was present, there might be exceptions to this rule. Referring, however, to the judgment of Steyn CJ in S v Nkombani, he held that, where dolus eventualis is alleged, the accused's foresight of the way in which death might occur must not differ markedly from the actual way in which the death occurs. The meaning of "differ markedly" ("wesenlike afwyking") would have to be elucidated by the courts in future cases, Van Heerden JA said.

The facts in Goosen were as follows: The appellant had participated in a robbery. It was found that, at the time, he had foreseen the possibility that one of his fellow robbers might intentionally shoot the deceased with a hand carbine, and thereby kill him. The robbers had waited for the deceased in a car outside his place of work. The deceased had got into his car and driven off; they followed him. When the deceased's car stopped at a stop sign, the robbers jumped out of their car and confronted him. One of the robbers, Mazibuko, held the hand carbine while another member of the group struck the deceased. The deceased's car (which had automatic transmission) started moving forward towards Mazibuko when the deceased's foot slipped off the brake. As the car moved towards Mazibuko, the carbine went off and the deceased was fatally shot.

Mazibuko claimed that he had pulled the trigger of the carbine by accident, or involuntarily. The trial Court and the Appellate Division accepted that there was a possibility that the trigger of the carbine had been pulled involuntarily. Mazibuko was found guilty of culpable homicide, in that he had negligently caused the deceased's death. The appellant, who had neither carried the carbine nor struck the deceased, but had nevertheless accompanied the gang, had on the insistent advice of counsel pleaded guilty to murder and was duly found guilty.

On appeal, the Appellate Division set aside the appellant's conviction of murder (and the imposition of the death sentence), and found him guilty of culpable homicide. The court held that the causing of death by intentional conduct (which the appellant was held to have foreseen) was markedly different from causing death by involuntary conduct (the way in which the death in fact occurred). The court accepted that death caused by the involuntary discharge of the firearm might have been foreseen by another individual, but the appellant, who had failed Standard 6, and was of low intelligence, had not been proved to have foreseen this sequence of events. The court therefore found the appellant guilty only of culpable homicide (on the basis that a reasonable person in the place of the appellant would have foreseen the possibility of death resulting from the involuntary discharge of the firearm). The appellant was sentenced to six years' imprisonment.

Van Heerden JA gave the following hypothetical example to support his conclusion on the question of mistake regarding the causal sequence: Imagine that a robber plans to rob a café owner. He takes a revolver with him and, although he fervently hopes that he will not have to use the weapon, he foresees as a reasonable possibility that he may have to kill the café owner to achieve his object. In the hope that the victim will hand over his money without the need for force, he hides the revolver in his pocket. As he is about to confront the café owner, he slips on the floor, the loaded revolver in his pocket goes off, and the café owner is killed by the bullet. Is the robber guilty of murder?

According to Van Heerden JA, he is not, because he made a fundamental mistake regarding the causal sequence which resulted in death. "However," writes Burchell,

could it not be argued that an acquittal on a murder charge could have resulted on the basis that the robber's conduct in entering the café with a loaded revolver in his pocket, although the factual cause of the deceased's death, was not the legal cause of such death, since his slipping, falling and the gun going off constituted a substantially unusual event which was not foreseen as a real possibility and which served to break the causal chain?

If this alternative, causal approach to Van Heerden JA's hypothetical example is correct, asks Burchell,

why is it necessary to invoke the theory of mistake as regards the causal sequence? Perhaps the answer may lie in the fact that in common-purposes cases (such as Goosen) the courts have specifically followed an approach which imputes the act of the perpetrator to the other participants in the common purpose, irrespective of whether the latter have contributed causally to the unlawful consequence or not. Their active participation in the common purpose coupled with the requisite guilty mind or fault is enough—either factual or legal causation between their association and the unlawful consequence is not required. The theory of mistake as regards the causal sequence, which is an aspect of mens rea, may thus be an important limiting device in cases of common-purpose liability, excluding liability for murder where death was foreseen by the participants in a common purpose, but death in fact occurred in an unexpected, or even bizarre, way.

====== Reconciling oneself to the ensuing result (recklessness) ======
Subjective foresight of the possibility of the occurrence of a consequence, or the existence of circumstances, is apparently not in itself sufficient for dolus eventualis. In addition, the accused's state of mind in regard to that possibility, it has been held, must be one of "consenting" to the materialisation of the possibility, "reconciling" himself to it, "taking [the foreseen possibility] into the bargain," or "recklessness" in regard to that possibility. Jansen JA, in S v Ngubane, used all of these apparently interchangeable terms to describe the additional element of dolus eventualis.

The issue of whether an accused person who foresees the possibility of a consequence, or the existence of a circumstance, may be said to consent or reconcile himself or herself to, or accept the consequence or circumstance into the bargain, is referred to as the "volitional" component of dolus eventualis.

In S v Beukes, Van Heerden JA acknowledged that no decision has in fact turned on the question of recklessness, and that normally recklessness would only be satisfied where the accused foresaw a consequence as a "reasonable" possibility. Nevertheless, Van Heerden JA noted that recklessness is of value as an additional element of dolus eventualis.

Van Heerden JA was of the view that, as an accused would seldom admit this element, the court had to draw an inference regarding an accused's state of mind from facts indicating, objectively assessed, a reasonable possibility that the result would ensue. From the mere fact that he acted, it could be inferred that he had reconciled himself to the result. Van Heerden JA held that this second element of dolus eventualis, the volitional element, would normally only be satisfied where the perpetrator had foreseen the result as a reasonable possibility. The Judge of Appeal gave two circumstances in which the volitional element is useful:

1. when the perpetrator realises that a result could well ensue, but then takes steps to guard against that result occurring; and
2. when a perpetrator had initially not foreseen the consequence as a reasonable possibility, but after the causal chain of events has commenced he changes his opinion.

In the latter case, Van Heerden JA says that the perpetrator would be reckless as to the result if he should take no steps to terminate the chain of events. He gives a hypothetical example: X, a party to a common purpose, initially does not foresee that another in the group is armed, but later finds out that he is. "Surely," writes Burchell, "this second situation mentioned by the Judge of Appeal could be seen as a case where, once he finds out the truth, he then has foresight of the real (reasonable) possibility of a firearm being used."

====== Subjective test of Intention ======
The subjective test of intention is based on the accused's state of mind. The question is not whether the accused should have foreseen, but whether he actually foresaw.

====== Intention in respect of circumstances ======
The requirements of dolus eventualis are substantially the same whether a consequence or circumstance is involved. However, since a causal sequence is never in issue in a circumstance crime, the rules about mistake regarding the causal sequence enunciated in Goosen obviously do not apply.

Furthermore, the element of "recklessness," in the context of circumstance crimes, has been expressed in terms of a deliberate abstention from making inquiries which might lead to the truth.

"However," observes Burchell, "if the difference between motive and intention is borne in mind, the purpose of abstention from making inquiries need not be to avoid having one's suspicions confirmed. Thus X would have the dolus eventualis required for the common-law offence of receiving stolen property, knowing the goods to be stolen, if he actually foresees as a real possibility that the goods have been stolen and nevertheless receives them, whatever his motive for abstaining from making further inquiries may be."

====== Defences excluding intention ======
The following defences exclude intention:

- ignorance or mistake as regards an essential element of liability;
- youth;
- mental illness;
- intoxication;
- provocation and emotional stress; and
- putative defences.

====== Putative defences ======
"Putative" means "supposed." The following are putative defences:

- putative private defence;
- putative necessity;
- putative obedience to orders;
- putative disciplinary chastisement;
- putative public authority; and
- putative consent.

==== Negligence (culpa) ====
Negligence is the term used in law to indicate that the conduct of a person has not conformed to a prescribed standard: that of the reasonable person (more specifically, what a reasonable person would have foreseen in the circumstances, and the care that would have been exercised by a reasonable person in such circumstances). The failure to ensure that conduct does conform to the standard is reprehensible. Negligence is therefore regarded as a form of fault.

Intention is conceptually different from negligence. Jansen JA, in Ngubane, stated that "culpa as opposed to dolus, is an aliud and not a minus." In other words, negligence is different and distinct from intention; it is not merely a lesser form of intention.

Intention involves a course of action purposefully chosen, with the knowledge that it is unlawful. The test of intention is simply what the accused knew or foresaw. It is an enquiry into the actual state of mind of the actor. The test is "subjective."

The test of negligence, on the other hand, is not necessarily what the actor thought or foresaw, but rather what a reasonable person would have foreseen and done in the circumstances. The enquiry is thus not as to the actual state of the actor's mind but rather as to whether his or her conduct measured up to that of the reasonable person. The test is "objective."

===== Test =====
Jansen JA observed in S v Ngubane that "some of our writers have propounded a 'subjective test' for negligence. It is also said that recent cases disclose a swing to the subjective approach [...] and that the case of S v Van As confirms this. It is, however, unnecessary for present purposes to express any opinion on this view, save for mentioning that there may be some doubt as to whether the phrase "redelikerwyse kon en moes voorsien het," used in S v Van As, connotes anything more than the conventional objective standard, albeit somewhat individualised."

These comments clearly favour an essentially objective test of negligence. "Although," as Burchell comments, "future courts will have to grapple with the rather enigmatic phrase 'somewhat individualised,'" it is apparent that the Appellate Division in certain post-Ngubane decisions emphasised the objective nature of the negligence criterion.

This simple conceptual distinction is subject, however, to two qualifications. The first qualification is that negligence does not always involve inadvertence, so the distinction between intention as foreseeing and negligence as not foreseeing sometimes breaks down. Burchell argues "that the concept of conscious negligence is also recognised in our law."

The second, although related, qualification is that proof of intention does not necessarily exclude a finding of negligence.

In determining liability in a criminal prosecution in which the fault of the accused allegedly constitutes negligence, the South African courts have traditionally applied the following test to determine whether the accused had been negligent:

- Would a reasonable person, in the same circumstances as the accused, have foreseen the reasonable possibility of the occurrence of the consequence or the existence of the circumstance in question, including its unlawfulness?
- If so, would a reasonable person have taken steps to guard against that possibility?
- If so, did the accused fail to take the steps which he should reasonably have taken to guard against it?

====== Reasonable person ======
The reasonable person is

- the bonus paterfamilias - general standard of care, ordinary or reasonable diligence; or
- the diligens paterfamilias - higher standard of care, greater diligence; or
- the diligentissimus paterfamilias - highest standard of care, utmost diligence.

In other words, the reasonable person is the average person, of ordinary knowledge and intelligence.

The criterion of the reasonable person was described by Holmes JA in S v Burger as follows:

One does not expect of a diligens paterfamilias any extremes such as Solomonic wisdom, prophetic foresight, chameleonic caution, headlong haste, nervous timidity, or the trained reflexes of a racing driver. In short, a diligens paterfamilias treads life's pathway with moderation and prudent common sense."

====== Reasonable foreseeability ======
The first limb of the traditional test is this: Would a reasonable person, in the same circumstances as the accused, have foreseen the reasonable possibility of the occurrence of the consequence or the existence of the circumstance in question, including its unlawfulness?

Mere carelessness does not automatically entail criminal liability for the consequences. In other words, "negligence in the air" or "abstract negligence" is not enough. The accused's negligence must relate to the consequences or circumstances in issue.

This relationship between negligence and the consequences or circumstances in issue is expressed in terms of reasonable foreseeability: Would a reasonable person in the position of the accused have foreseen the possibility of the occurrence of that consequence or the existence of that circumstance?

In the light of the Appellate Division decisions in S v Van der Mescht, S v Bernardus and S v Van As, it is now clear that, on a charge of culpable homicide, the prosecution must prove, beyond a reasonable doubt, that a reasonable person in the position of the accused would have foreseen the possibility of death; reasonable foreseeability of bodily injury, short of death, will not suffice.

In S v Van der Mescht, the accused and "G" had melted gold amalgam on a stove for the purposes of extracting the gold. As a result of the heating, the amalgam emitted mercurial gas which resulted in the death of G and four of the children who were in the house at the time. The trial court convicted the accused of culpable homicide. The conviction was, however, set aside by the Appellate Division, the majority holding that the prosecution had failed to prove that the deaths were attributable to the accused's negligence. In other words, it had not been proved, beyond reasonable doubt, that a reasonable person in the position of the accused would have foreseen that the heating of gold amalgam might lead to the death of someone.

The Appellate Division in S v Bernardus had to answer the following question of law: Is a person guilty of culpable homicide if he unlawfully assaults another and, in so doing, causes his death, but under circumstances in which he could not reasonably have foreseen the death? Steyn CJ, delivering the judgment of the court, answered this question in the negative: Death—not merely bodily injury short of death—must be reasonably foreseeable. Holmes JA did, however, point out that where an accused assaults another in circumstances in which he ought reasonably to have foreseen the possibility of causing him serious injury, he ought also to have foreseen "the possibility of death hovering in attendance: the two are sombrely familiar as cause and effect in the walks of human experience."

Holmes JA's observation in no way detracts from the principle that, in culpable homicide cases, death must be reasonably foreseeable. The observation underscores the principle, but emphasises that in practice reasonable foreseeability of death might be inferred from reasonable foreseeability of serious bodily injury.

Rumpff CJ in S v Van As restated the general principle as follows: "In criminal law, when death follows upon an unlawful assault, it must be proved, before there can be a finding of culpable homicide, that the accused could and must reasonably have foreseen that death could intervene as a result of the assault. The expression "must have foreseen" is used in the sense of "ought to have foreseen". If it is proved that the accused ought reasonably to have foreseen that death was a possible result and that the causation requirement has been satisfied the case is concluded [....] The question is, however, [...] could and should the accused reasonably have foreseen that the deceased could have died as a result [of the assault?] That foreseeability of serious bodily harm usually, but not always, goes hand in hand with foreseeability of death is correct, but it will certainly depend on the nature of the injuries inflicted in a particular case whether there was a reasonable foreseeability of death or not." In Van As, the accused gave "D's" cheek a hard slap during an altercation. As a result D, who was a very fat man, lost his balance, fell backwards and hit his head on the cement floor. He fell unconscious and later died. The trial court convicted the accused of culpable homicide, but on appeal the verdict was altered to one of guilty of assault only, since it had not been proved that, in all the circumstances, the accused could and should reasonably have foreseen D's death.

CAN NEGLIGENCE & INTENTION OVERLAP? In S v Ngubane, Jansen JA stated that "dolus postulates foreseeing, but culpa does not necessarily postulate not foreseeing. A man may foresee the possibility of harm and yet be negligent in respect of that harm ensuing." Prior to Ngubane, there had been a conflict in both academic and judicial opinion about whether dolus (intention) and culpa (negligence) were mutually exclusive concepts. Jansen JA in Ngubane has resolved the matter authoritatively by concluding that proof of dolus does not necessarily exclude a finding of culpa: "Dolus connotes a volitional state of mind; culpa connotes a failure to measure up to a standard of conduct. Seen in this light it is difficult to accept that proof of dolus excludes culpa. The facts of the present case illustrate this. The appellant, somewhat under the influence of liquor, without premeditation and as a result of some provocation, stabbed the deceased five times, the fatal injury penetrating the heart. The inference drawn by the Court a quo that he foresaw the possibility of death ensuing and that he killed intentionally (dolus eventualis) is clear. This, however, does not preclude the matter being viewed from a different angle: did not the appellant, foreseeing the possibility of death ensuing by failing to curb his emotions and failing to desist from attacking the deceased, fall short of the standard of the reasonable man (or, if the subjective approach were to be applied, to measure up to the standard of his own capabilities)? The existence of dolus does not preclude the answering of this question in the affirmative.'" In reaching this conclusion, Jansen JA categorically rejected definitions of negligence (culpa) that specifically require the absence of intention (dolus).

NEGLIGENCE & MISTAKE If the accused is charged with committing an offence for which negligence is sufficient for liability, then, if the accused genuinely and reasonably did not know that what he was doing was unlawful, he must be acquitted. In R v Mbombela 1933 AD 269, the accused was tried by jury and found guilty of the murder of a nine-year-old child. The accused, between eighteen and twenty years of age, living in a rural area, was described by the court as of "rather below the normal" intelligence. On the day in question, some children were outside a hut they supposed to be empty. They saw "something that had two small feet like those of a human being." They were frightened and called the accused, who apparently thought the object was a "tikoloshe," an evil spirit that, according to a widespread superstitious belief, occasionally took the form of a little old man with small feet. According to this belief, it would be fatal to look the "tikoloshe" in the face. The accused went to fetch a hatchet and, in the half-light, struck the form a number of times with the hatchet. When he dragged the object out of the hut, he found that he had killed his young nephew. Mbombela's defence was bona fide mistake: He believed he was killing a "tikoloshe," not a human being. A jury in the trial court found him guilty of murder. Applying a standard of reasonableness that ignored the "race or the idiosyncracies [sic], or the superstitions, or the intelligence of the person accused," the Appellate Division held that, although his belief was unreasonable, it was based on a bona fide mistake of fact, so the killing fell within the Native Territories Penal Code definition of culpable homicide rather than murder.

ATTEMPT & ACCOMPLICES

Actus reus and mens rea: the contemporaneity rule

Where fault (mens rea) is an element of the crime charged, the unlawful conduct and the fault must exist contemporaneously. In other words, the wrongdoer must intend to commit or be negligent in the commission of the crime at the time that the crime is being committed. Thus a person will not be guilty of murder if, "whilst he is driving to Y's house in order to kill him there, he negligently runs over somebody, and it later transpires that the deceased is Y." Likewise, it is not murder if a person kills another accidentally and "later expresses his joy at having killed him." The contemporaneity rule has been in issue in cases where the accused intends to kill another and, having inflicted what he thinks is a fatal wound on that other person, he then disposes of the body or sets alight to the building in which the body lies. In fact, the victim does not die from the initial assault, but from the subsequent conduct of disposing of the body, or from carbon monoxide poisoning caused by the fumes from the fire, as in S v Masilela 1968 (2) SA 558 (A). In these cases, the initial assault is accompanied by the intent to kill but, technically, the unlawful consequence of death is not present at that time, because death only results later. Similarly, when death results, technically, there is no intent to kill because the accused believes his victim is already dead. The Appellate Division has refused to exculpate the accused of murder in such a case. In S v Masilela, the appellants assaulted their victim by striking him over the head and throttling him with a tie. Although the assault caused the victim serious injuries which rendered him unconscious, it did not kill him. After throwing the victim on the bed and covering him with a blanket, the appellants proceeded to ransack the house. Then, believing the victim to be already dead, they set the bed alight, as well as the house, and made off. The victim died, not from the assault, but as a result of carbon-monoxide poisoning caused by the fumes from the fire. In an appeal from a conviction of murder, it was contended that at most the appellants were guilty of attempted murder on the ground that, in respect of the assault, the intention (mens rea) for murder had been present, but not the unlawful consequence of death; and, with regard to the burning, there had been the unlawful consequence required for murder but not the intention (mens rea), since the appellants believed the victim to be already dead. The Appellate Division held that the appellants were guilty of murder. Ogilvie Thompson JA refused to regard the assault and the subsequent burning as two separate and disconnected acts. Rumpff JA took the view that, in this kind of case, where the accused and nobody else causes death, the accused's mistake as to the precise manner in which and time when death occurred is not a factor on which he may rely.

PARTICIPATION IN CRIMINAL ACTIVITIES PERSONS INVOLVED IN A CRIME There are three types of person who may be involved in the commission of a crime, and therefore liable for it: • perpetrators; • accomplices; and • accessories after the fact. See S v Williams 1980 (1) SA 60 (A). Perpetrators and accomplices are participants in the crime; an accessory after the fact is not a participant. Perpetrators and accomplices participate before completion of the crime; accessories after the fact are involved after completion of the crime.

From Snyman:

PARTICIPATION BEFORE COMPLETION OF THE CRIME In the case of participation before completion of the crime, a perpetrator is one who, with the necessary fault (mens rea), commits the unlawful conduct, and thereby satisfies the definitional elements of the crime in question. Where there is more than one perpetrator, we speak of co-perpetrators. According to contemporary South African criminal theory, a person may be liable as a perpetrator in three separate situations: • where he personally satisfies the definitional elements of the crime, and is therefore a perpetrator in his or her own right (since his liability is in no way accessory to or dependent on the conduct of another person); • where he or she, although possessing the requisite capacity and the fault element (mens rea) for the crime in question, does not personally comply with all of the elements of the unlawful conduct in question, and the conduct of the perpetrator is "attributed" or "imputed" to him or her, by virtue of his or her prior agreement or active association in a common purpose to commit the crime in question; or • where a person procures another person, who may be an innocent or unwilling agent, to commit a crime.

COMMON PURPOSE Where two or more people agree to commit a crime or actively associate in a joint unlawful enterprise, each will be responsible for the specific criminal conduct committed by one of their number which falls within their common design. Liability arises from their "common purpose" to commit the crime. If the participants are charged with having committed a "consequence crime," it is not necessary for the prosecution to prove beyond reasonable doubt that each participant committed conduct which contributed causally to the ultimate unlawful consequence. It is sufficient to establish • a prior agreement by the participants to commit a crime; or • no such prior agreement, but an active association by the participants in its commission. This usually happens when the number of people partaking in the crime is large—a mob, that is to say. If this is established, then the conduct of the participant who actually causes the consequence is imputed or attributed to the other participants. It is not necessary to establish precisely which member of the common purpose caused the consequence, provided that it is established that one of the group brought about this result. In respect of both of the above forms of common purpose, the following elements are essential: • fault (mens rea), which may take the form either of intention or of negligence, the central question being when the common purpose was formulated; • unlawful conduct, which refers participation in the unlawful act, rather than the act itself; and • causation, in terms of which the conduct of the person who actually causes the consequence is imputed or attributed to the other participants. The common-purpose doctrine is a departure from the general principles of criminal law. Its rationale is one of crime control. The doctrine has been much criticised over the years, most recently in the aftermath of the Marikana massacre, when it was incorrectly claimed in media circles that it had its origins in apartheid-era legislation. It has survived such criticism, however, and remains a valuable tool for the courts.

Common Purpose: Active Association The common-purpose rule originated in English law and was introduced into South Africa via the Native Territories' Penal Code. The much-publicised murder conviction of the "Sharpeville Six" in terms of the common-purpose doctrine, in S v Safatsa 1988 (1) SA 868 (A), highlighted the significance of the common-purpose doctrine in the context of the administration of criminal justice in South Africa. The controversial imposition of the death penalty on the Six also played a significant role in strengthening the call for the abolition or reassessment of the death penalty in South Africa. Evidence of the specific participation of the Sharpeville Six in the murder of the deputy-mayor of Lekoa was meagre, aside from the fact that they had joined the crowd of about a hundred persons that attacked the deceased's house in Sharpeville. It was not possible to determine which members of the mob had been personally responsible for killing the mayor. Nevertheless, there was some evidence to implicate the Six in the subsequent killing of the deceased. He was killed by stoning and burning perpetrated by some members of the crowd, but it was not possible to determine which specific members had participated directly in the killing. Accused number 1 had grabbed hold of the deceased, wrestled with him for possession of his pistol, and thrown the first stone at the deceased, which felled him. Accused number 2 had thrown stones at the deceased and at his house. After the deceased's house had been set alight, accused number 2 had thrown a stone at the deceased which had struck him on his back. Accused number 3 had grabbed the deceased, wrestled with him for possession of his pistol, and succeeded in dispossessing him of the weapon. Accused number 4 was part of the crowd which converged on the deceased's house; she had shouted repeated exhortations to the crowd to kill the deceased (since the deceased was shooting at them) and had slapped a woman who had remonstrated with the crowd not to burn the deceased. Accused numbers 5 and 6 had been part of the vanguard of the crowd which had converged on the deceased's house and stoned it, but they were not seen to have thrown any stones themselves, and were ultimately acquitted on the basis that there was insufficient evidence to conclude that they shared the requisite intent to kill at the relevant time. Accused number 7 had made petrol bombs, set the deceased's house alight, and pushed the deceased's car into the street and set it alight. Accused number 8 had also made petrol bombs and handed them out with instructions, had commanded the mob to set the deceased's house on fire, and had assisted in pushing the car into the street. The Appellate Division, in a unanimous judgment, approved the conviction of the Six on the basis of the doctrine of common purpose. The court pointed out that the intention of each participant must be considered, together with the question of whether or not each had the requisite dolus in respect of the death. The court traced the historical development of the doctrine, and found that "it would constitute a drastic departure from a firmly established practice to hold now that a party to a common purpose cannot be convicted of murder unless a causal connection is proved between his conduct and the death of the deceased. I can see no good reason for warranting such a departure." In S v Mgedezi 1989 (1) SA 687 (A), the Appellate Division drew a distinction between common-purpose liability • where there is a prior agreement, expressed or implied, to commit a crime (the mandate situation); and • where there is no such prior agreement. In the latter situation, certain additional requirements have to be satisfied before the principle of imputation, which is the characteristic of common-purpose liability, can arise. In S v Mgedezi, the court held that, in the absence of proof of a prior agreement, an accused who was not shown to have contributed causally to the killing or wounding of the victims could be held liable for those events on the basis of Safatsa only if certain prerequisites were satisfied: • he must have been present at the scene where the violence was being committed; • he must have been aware of the assault on the victims; • he must have intended to make common cause with those who were actually perpetrating the assault; • he must have manifested his sharing of a common purpose with the perpetrators by himself performing some act of association with the conduct of the others; and • there must be the requisite mens rea. In respect, therefore, of the killing of the deceased, he must have intended them to be killed, or must have foreseen the possibility of their being killed and performed his own act of association with recklessness as to whether or not death was to ensue. In S v Thebus, the Constitutional Court considered the active-association form of common purpose. The court held that, in its then-current form, the doctrine violated a number of constitutional rights. The formulation in Mgedezi, however, passed constitutional muster. It can no longer be said, then, that common-purpose doctrine is part of the old order, since it has been ratified as constitutional in the new one. Thebus has been criticised, though, for having dispensed with the causation element, and for its infringement on the presumption of innocence and the requirement that the prosecution prove each element of the crime. See Burchell 580-588; Snyman 263-272.

WHEN DOES A COMMON PURPOSE ARISE? Differences of opinion about the precise moment when a common purpose arises were resolved by the Appellate Division in its unanimous judgment in S v Motaung 1990 (4) SA 485 (A), delivered by Hoexter JA who concluded that the matter must be decided with reference to legal principle. Hoexter JA held that a distinction should be drawn between "participation in a common purpose to kill which begins before the deceased has been fatally wounded and such participation which begins thereafter but while the deceased is still alive." Hoexter JA reached the conclusion that, where there is a reasonable possibility that a joiner-in (or late-comer) acceded to a common purpose to kill only after the deceased had been fatally injured by another, and that the joiner-in had done nothing to expedite the death of the deceased, he could not be found guilty of murder but only of attempted murder. Of course, if the joiner-in does perpetrate conduct which expedites the death of the deceased then he may be liable as a co-perpetrator in his own right.

DISSOCIATION / WITHDRAWAL FROM A COMMON PURPOSE See: Snyman at 270-272 • clear & unambiguous intention to withdraw. • some positive act of withdrawal. • voluntary. • before course of events have reached "commencement of execution". • type of act required will depend on circumstances

S v Singo 1993 (2) SA 765 (A) S v Lungile 1999 (2) SACR 597 (SCA) Musingadi & others v S 2005 (1) SACR 395 (SCA) or [2004] 4 All SA 274 (SCA) esp. par 33 onward

ACCOMPLICES S v Williams: • An accomplice is not a perpetrator or a co-perpetrator; he lacks actus reus of the perpetrator. This is the most important defining element of an accomplice. • associates himself wittingly with the crime – knowingly affords perpetrator / co-perpetrator opportunity, means or info which furthers commission of crime. See Joubert J in this case on the frequent confusion between accomplices and perps.

Elements of accomplice liability: • Accomplice liability is accessory in nature. Someone else must have first initiated the unlawful act or acts. • Unlawful conduct here may take various forms, such as facilitating. See textbooks. • Accomplices must intentionally facilitate the completion of the crime; there's no such thing as a negligent accomplice. S v Williams sets the above out in detail. Consult it. PUNISHMENT OF ACCOMPLICES: same as perpetrator but extent may differ. So not necessarily a lighter sentence.

PARTICIPATION AFTER COMPLETION OF THE CRIME ACCESSORY AFTER THE FACT This person didn't facilitate the commission of the crime; he arrives after the crime has been committed and helps, usually, to cover it up, or more generally to help the perpetrators to escape justice. • association approach: broad • Unlawfully and intentionally assists perpetrator after completion of crime by associating himself with its commission • defeating or obstructing the course of justice: narrow • Specific objective – e.g. disposing of evidence

Problem: It's an essential, for there to be an accessory, that there be also a perpetrator. This gives rise to the following problem: • A, B and C are charged with the murder of D. • There's no doubt that one or two of them killed D, but it's impossible to determine which of them did it, and it is clear that there was no common purpose to kill D. • After the murder they all helped to conceal the body. • If none of them can be convicted of murder, can all three be convicted as accessories after the fact? This conundrum was dealt with in the following cases: • S v Gani 1957 (2) SA 212 (A) • S v Jonathan 1987 (1) SA 633 (A) • S v Morgan 1993 (2) SACR 134 (A)

INCOMPLETE (INCHOATE) CRIMES Attempt • Common Law • s.18(1) of the Riotous Assemblies Act 17 of 1956: Any person who attempts to commit any offence against a statute or a statutory regulation shall be guilty of an offence and, if no punishment is expressly provided thereby for such an attempt, be liable on conviction to the punishment to which a person convicted of actually committing that offence would be liable. • Persons can be convicted of attempting to commit a crime if: • they have completed such an attempt, • if the attempt has not been completed. R v Schoombie 1945 AD 541 at 545-6: "Attempts seem to fall naturally into 2 classes: • those in which the wrongdoer, intending to commit a crime, has done everything which he set out to do but has failed in his purpose either through lack of skill, or of foresight, or through the existence of some unexpected obstacle or otherwise, (= completed attempt) • those in which the wrongdoer has not completed all that he has set out to do, because the completion of his unlawful acts has been prevented by the intervention of some outside agency." (= uncompleted attempt)

Types of attempt: • Completed attempt Uncompleted Attempts: • Interrupted attempt • Attempt to commit the impossible • Voluntary withdrawal

COMPLETED ATTEMPTS: • R v Nlhovo 1921 AD 485 • S v Laurence 1974 (4) SA 825 (A)

UNCOMPLETED ATTEMPTS: • Must examine proximity of accused's conduct to commission of crime

Interrupted Attempts: A distinction is drawn between: • an act of preparation and one of • execution or consummation: • If the act merely amounted to a preparation for the crime: no attempt. • But if the acts were more than acts of preparation, and were in fact acts of consummation: guilty of attempt. S v Schoombie 1945 AD 541 • Commencement of consummation test: Proximity of consummation to crime relates to: • Time • Place • Natural order of things / course of events • Retention of control over events by accused • State of mind of accused • Practical common sense See: Burchell 627-631. R v Katz 1959 (3) SA 408 (C)

Attempt to Commit the Impossible • No longer an act of preparation – has passed the boundary line into "commencement of consummation" • Crime may be physically or legally impossible • R v Davies 1956 (3) SA 52 (A): relates to physical (factual impossibility)

Change of mind & voluntary withdrawal • Voluntary withdrawal after commencement of consummation but before completion of crime seems to be no defence. • R v Hlatwayo 1933 TPD 441

Proximity: • Completed Attempts: Proximity / Remoteness not relevant • Uncompleted Attempts: Proximity or Remoteness of attempt to completion of crime = essential enquiry

Intention • There must be intention to commit the completed crime. • Dolus eventualis is sufficient. • Remember: cannot negligently attempt to do something.

Punishment

== Specific crimes ==
Assault with intent to grievous bodily harm

The common-law definition of "treason," found in S v Banda, is "any overt act committed by a person, within or without the State, who, owing allegiance to the State, having majestas," has the intention of

1. "unlawfully impairing, violating, threatening or endangering the existence, independence or security of the State;
2. "unlawfully overthrowing the government of the State;
3. "unlawfully changing the constitutional structure of the State; or
4. "unlawfully coercing by violence the government of the State into any action or into refraining from any action."

This definition would appear to be the one most frequently relied upon in South African courts.

=== Damage of property ===
==== Arson ====
A person commits arson if he unlawfully and intentionally sets fire to

- immovable property belonging to another; or
- his own immovable insured property, to claim the value of property from an insurer.

===== Elements =====
The elements of the crime are the following: (a) setting fire to (b) immovable property (c) unlawfully and (d) intentionally.

===== Requirements =====
Arson is only a particular form of the crime of malicious injury to property. The crime can be committed only in respect of immovable property: that is, "buildings and other immovable property." If movable property is set alight, the crime of malicious injury to property may be committed, provided that the other requirements are met. The crime is completed only at the moment that the property has been set alight. If the arsonist is caught at a stage before the property has been set alight, he is guilty of attempted arson only, provided that his conduct has, according to the general rules governing liability for attempt, proceeded beyond mere acts of preparation.

As in malicious injury to property, one cannot in principle commit arson in respect of one's own property. The courts, however, including the appellate division, in R v Mavros, have held that a person commits arson if he sets fire to his own property to claim its value from the insurer. In the estimation of Snyman, "It would have been better to punish this type of conduct as fraud instead of arson, but the courts will in all probability not depart from the appeal court's view."

Intention, and more particularly the intention to damage property by setting fire to it, thereby causing patrimonial harm to somebody, is also required. Dolus eventualis in this regard is sufficient.

== See also ==
- Crime in South Africa
- Law of South Africa
- South African criminal procedure
