= South African law of sale =

Law related to purchases and sales

The South African law of sale is an area of the legal system in that country that describes rules applicable to a contract of sale (or, to be more specific, purchase and sale, or emptio venditio), generally described as a contract whereby one person agrees to deliver to another the free possession of a thing in return for a price in money.

== Definition and essentials of the contract ==
=== Definition ===
The contract of sale, as it is known in South Africa today, derives its origins from the Roman consensual contract of emptio venditio. In D 18.1 (the title devoted to the contract of emptio venditio), there is no all-embracing definition of the special contract, but certain critical features can be extracted from the early fragments of the title:

Sale is a contract of the law of nations, and so is concluded by simple agreement. There is no sale without a price. There can be no sale without a thing to be sold.

The Roman-Dutch lawyers followed these guidelines closely in their definitions of the contract of sale. For example, Voet said:

Purchase defined—But in this title, as distinguished from lease, it is a bonae fidei contract, resting on consent, by which it is arranged that merchandise shall be exchanged at a definite price. There are three essential requirements for it—consent, merchandise and price. If one of them is wanting, there is no purchase.

In South African law today, the definition of a contract of sale remains virtually the same. In Treasurer-General v Lippert, the full board of the Judicial Committee of the Privy Council cited with approval the following statement by De Villiers CJ:

A sale is a contract in which one person (the seller or vendor) promises to deliver a thing to another (the buyer or emptor), the latter agreeing to pay a certain price.

According to Mackeurtan,

Purchase and sale (emptio venditio) is a mutual contract for the transfer of possession of a thing in exchange for a price. It has three essentials: consent (consensus ad idem); a thing sold (merx); and a price (pretium).

Remember that a sale contract is a special form of contract, and so all law discussed under the article on the South African law of contract is relevant in considering sale contracts.

=== Essentials ===
In general terms, the essential elements of a contract of sale are no different from the essential elements of any other contract. There must be contractual capacity and consensus, the agreement must be legal (not contrary to public policy), performance must be possible, and any formalities required by law must be complied with. The contract of sale does, however, have a number of additional substantive requirements (known as essentialia), which are assimilated into the general contractual structure. Of course, like any contract, the requirement of consensus, or agreement, is the most important general element.

==== Agreement ====
The parties must be in agreement that the object of the contract is to purchase and to sell the res concerned, for the price agreed upon, and that the seller (usually) ensures the transfer of possession and/or ownership of the res to the buyer.

The general principles relating to consensus in purchase and sale are the same as those pertaining to other multilateral consensual contracts. The relevant points may be summarised as follows:

- There must be an agreement of the minds of the parties, mutually communicated, usually by means of offer and acceptance.
- The parties must act with the intention of contracting a sale. there must be a concursus animorum animo contrahendi.
- The agreement should be free from mistake or error, and should not have been induced wrongfully by misrepresentation, duress or undue influence.
- The agreement should be legal and satisfy the dictates of public policy.
- The agreement should be rational. It cannot therefore exist in cases of extreme youth, irrational intoxication or insanity.

In sales in particular, there must be agreement as to:

- the subject matter of the sale and its essential characteristics;
- the price to be paid; and
- any other item raised in the negotiations and expressly or impliedly regarded as material.

The two essentialia of a contract of sale are therefore

- the thing sold; and
- the price to be paid.

===== Thing sold =====
The parties to the sale must reach agreement over the subject matter of the sale. The general requirement is that the subject matter of the sale should be

- defined and ascertainable (although the merx need not be entirely specific); and
- existing at the time of the contract, or having a potential existence.

It is best to tackle the intricacies of this particular section by first examining things that can be sold, and secondly, things that cannot validly be sold.

====== Things that can be sold ======
Generally speaking, anything can be sold, be it corporeal or incorporeal in nature. Physical existence is not required for there to be a valid sale. Anything that can be held, possessed or sued for can be the subject of a valid sale. There are, however, certain more specialised issues that need to be discussed for the full picture to emerge. These things or articles are not only restricted by common law, but are also prohibited by legislation, except where the courts can set aside such stipulations.

The question in respect of a sale of res sua is whether or not a person can enter into a valid contract of sale, involving the purchase of a thing that is (unbeknownst to him) his own property already. The general rule is that things owned by the buyer cannot be the subject of a valid sale. It is possible, however, for the purchaser to buy rights in his own property that he does not yet hold.

Unascertained goods may form the subject matter of a valid contract of sale. Such sales may be termed generic sales, or emptio generis. Future goods, or goods that do not yet exist, may also be the subject of a valid sale. Such a sale may take one of two forms.

A sale can come into being if it involves something that does not yet in exist, provided that the thing may, in the ordinary course of events, come into existence. Pothier says the following:

There cannot, in truth, be a contract of sale without a thing sold, but it is sufficient that the thing sold may exist, though it has no present existence. Thus, it is common before harvest, to sell the wine which we may make; and in such case, there is a sufficient thing to constitute the object of a valid contract, though as the thing sold does not yet exist, the contract depends upon the condition of its future existence; and if it should not yet happen to exist, that is, if no wine should be made, there is no sale.

These sorts of contracts are known as emptio rei speratae. A classic example would be that where Boucher agrees to purchase Smith's next crop of maize at R40 per bag. Because the sale involves maize, it appears at first glance to be a generic sale, but it is distinguishable on at least two grounds:

1. The source of the grain is specified: It must be Smith's crop.
2. The agreement is subject to a suspensive condition: If Smith's crop does not materialise, there is no sale.

It is possible to purchase the expectation or hope that something might come into existence, irrespective of whether it does or does not come into existence in future. The jurisprudent Pomponius is quoted as saying:

Sometimes, indeed, there is held to be a sale, even without a thing, as where what is bought is, as it were, a chance. This is the case with the purchase of a catch of birds or fish. The contract is valid even if nothing results, because it is the purchase of a hope.

Such a contract is a contract emptio spei. For example, Boucher agrees to purchase Smith's next catch of fish for R200. What is sold in this case is the hope or expectation of a catch, not the catch itself. The spes exists at the date of sale. It makes no difference to the obligations of the parties whether Smith catches anything at all. Thus, Boucher runs the risk of making a loss, in that he must pay even if nothing comes into existence, but may benefit in that he may receive greater value than his capital outlay.

Res aliena, things that are not the property of the seller, may also be the subject of a valid sale. It is not essential that the seller be the owner of the goods at the time of delivery. The sale is not void simply because the seller is not the owner of the res vendita, and has sold it without the owner's authority. What is essential is that the seller delivers the property to the buyer, and ensures that his possession is not thereafter interfered with by anyone with better title. The buyer in such circumstances is protected (at the very least) by the residual warranty against eviction.

Delivery of the res, in such circumstances, would result in transfer from the seller to the buyer of whatever rights the seller had. The buyer would acquire civil possession of the res, the consequences of which would be, inter alia,

- the right to ownership upon completion of prescription;
- the right to the fruits of the property; and
- the right to use possessory remedies.

Things that are the subject of litigation in rem (res litigiosa) may be the subject of a valid contract of sale as well. Such a sale might occur where property, which is the subject of pending court action, is sold in the interim. Should such property be sold, the purchaser is bound by the judgment in the action. The successful plaintiff is entitled to recover it from the purchaser (the new possessor) by execution, without further proceedings.

Where property is the subject of an action in rem, it becomes res litigiosa at litis contestatio.

====== Things that cannot be sold ======
Various things cannot be sold under South African law. Res extra commercium are among them. Numerous rules of statutory and common law prohibit the sale of certain things, often on grounds of public policy. For example, the common law does not sanction the sale of a person (slavery), and statute prohibits the sale of human tissue, and of many narcotics, chemical substances and so forth.

It is also quite clearly impossible to purchase a thing that never existed. The most extreme example would be the putative sale of a mythical or fictitious object. Justinian says:

Anything, whether movable or immovable, which admits of private ownership, may be made the object of a stipulation; but if a man stipulates for the delivery of a thing that either does not or cannot exist, such as [...] an impossible creature, like a hippocentaur, the contract is void.

Where the subject of a proposed contract of sale is a specific thing, and it has, prior to the agreement, and unbeknownst to the parties, ceased to exist, the agreement is ordinarily void. In Theron Ltd (in Liquidation) v Gross, Watermeyer J said,

Undoubtedly it is a principle of our law that a contract for the sale of a specific thing, made in ignorance of the fact that the things had been destroyed at the time of the contract, is not binding upon the parties.

For a good factual example, see Scrutton and Scrutton v Erlich & Co and Others.

It is impossible for res litigiosa to be sold to the seller's advocate or attorney. This is known as champerty. Mackeurtan states,

There can be no valid sale, at any stage of the proceedings, of property the subject of such an action, to the advocate or attorney of the seller. Such agreements are known as pacta de quota litis and are void.

The sale by Wells to Samuels of an inheritance expected from Hutton, while Hutton is still alive, is stigmatised by being unenforceable, although it is not void ab initio. Once Hutton has died, however, an inheritance may be sold.

====== Sales by description and sample ======
Some sales occur either by description or by sample.

===== Price =====
In Westinghouse Brake and Equipment (Pty) Ltd v Bilger Engineering (Pty) Ltd, Corbett JA said the following:

It is a general rule of our law that there can be no valid contract of sale unless the parties have agreed, expressly or by implication, upon a purchase price.

Mackeurtan identifies the following essentials in connection with price. It must be

- serious;
- fixed or capable of ascertainment; and
- sound in current money.

====== Serious ======
Being serious in amount implies that any price that is real, not illusory, suffices. If the price set is merely nominal in amount, this may be a strong indication that the parties intend a donation, not a sale. The question can be settled only on the circumstances of each individual case. In other words, the price should be real and bear some sort of relationship to the actual value of the thing, and the seller must intend actually exacting the price. Ulpian says,

If a person sells for a small price meaning to make a gift, the sale is valid, for it is only when donation is the sole consideration moving the sale that we hold it absolutely void; but when a thing is sold at a reduced price as a mode of donation there is no doubt that the sale is good.

The parties are not prevented by this requirement from driving a hard bargain and obtaining the thing for a very low price, or selling it for a very high price, given the intention to buy or sell for that price. It follows then that the price need not necessarily be fair or equivalent to the value of the thing, but that it should be a real price the seller must intend to exact and the buyer intend to pay. Zulman and Kairinos say,

The policy of the law is to allow everyone, in the absence of fraud, to make the best bargain he can, and both vendor and the purchaser are entitled by the exercise of superior shrewdness, to circumvent each other as long as such circumvention does not amount to fraud."

Although it is a question of fact, a price is often not held to be real or serious if it bears absolutely no relation to the value of the thing sold. This is the situation, for example, where the price is truly nominal or illusory—as in circumstances where the seller has no intention whatsoever of exacting the so-called price. Some parties may also dress up a contract as a "sale," when in fact it is designed to be some other form of contract entirely.

====== Certain, fixed or readily ascertainable ======
Ordinarily speaking, the price to be paid for the merx must be fixed by the parties. This is not an absolute rule. The general principle is id certum est quod certum reddi potest: That which can readily be made certain is certain. It is therefore not necessary that the price actually have been fixed to fulfil this requirement; it is sufficient if the parties have agreed upon a method by which the price can be fixed. In Burroughs Machines Ltd v Chenille Corporation of SA (Pty) Ltd, Colman J said,

It is I think clear that there can be no valid contract of sale unless the parties have agreed, expressly or by implication, upon a purchase price. They must either fix the amount of that price in their contract or agree upon some external standard by the application whereof it will be possible to determine the price without further reference to them."

If the parties take the latter route, the important thing is that it must be possible to ascertain the price by the method agreed upon. This can be done in several ways:

1. The price would be regarded as readily ascertainable if it could be fixed by reference to some independent circumstances.
2. The price may be left to a named third party agreed upon by the parties to the contract. Should the third party be unable to set the price, or refuse to do so, there is no sale. If the third party cannot be identified—for example, where the parties have not fixed a way of identifying the third party, or have not named him—then the contract does not come into existence; there is no sale. Similarly, where the agreement is that one of the parties or their nominee fixes the price, there is no sale. This basic principle of the common law of sale has, however, been called into question in a strenuous obiter dictum in the case of NBS Boland Bank v One Berg River Drive; Deeb v ABSA Bank; Friedman v Standard Bank.
3. It is quite acceptable for the parties to agree expressly that the purchase price is "the usual or the current market price." This scenario presents no difficulties. The formula "the usual price" may also be implied in many sales where no purchase price is expressly mentioned. The situation regarding the fixing of the price in such circumstances is as follows: There is an implied contract on the basis of the usual price at which that commodity is sold, or the current market price of that particular type of goods.

====== Current money ======
The price must consist in valid currency. It need not be expressed in South Africa currency; if it is not, however, then in some convertible foreign currency.

Where the consideration is completely in goods, rather than in money, the contract is one of exchange, not a sale. If it consists partly in money and partly in goods, the contract may be a sale or an exchange, depending upon the intention of the parties. Generally, though, the contract is a sale.

This section considers legal consequences of the contract of sale, along with those of conditional sales, which modify the usual consequences. Certain relevant contractual terms are also briefly discussed.

== Legal effects of the contract ==
=== Passing of ownership ===
It is not a requirement of a valid contract of sale that ownership should pass from seller to buyer. Although parties to a sale usually contemplate this happening, it is not an essential feature of a contract of sale, and (as we have seen) sales by non-owners are permissible. At common law, the transfer of a real right of ownership (the performance of the contract) is regarded as a separate legal transaction from the contract itself, which creates only personal obligations.

Because ownership does pass as a result of most contracts of sale, however, the issue of ownership is an important incidence of a sale.

Usually, to transfer ownership in a res, it is not only necessary that it be physically delivered by the owner; it is necessary also that the owner have the intention of transferring the right of ownership to the buyer, and that the buyer have the intention of becoming the owner of the thing in question.

As far as sales are concerned, there are certain additional refinements:

==== Immovable property ====
In the case of immovables, ownership passes upon registration of transfer in the Deeds Registry. The position is regulated by the Deeds Registries Act. In other words, registration constitutes delivery in the case of immovables, and ownership passes whether the price has been paid or not.

==== Incorporeals ====
Ownership in incorporeals is transferred by means of cession.

==== Movable property ====
Ownership in movable property is transferred

- upon delivery of the res; coupled with
- either payment of the purchase price, the provision of security or the giving of credit.

===== Delivery =====
Delivery usually occurs by means of traditio. Ownership passes on traditio only if the following essentials are present:

- The thing must be capable of ownership.
- The seller must have legal capacity to sell.
- Traditio must be made by the seller (or his agent), since the owner of the thing cannot be deprived of his ownership by the wrongful act of another, and no-one can transfer greater rights in a thing than he possesses. No one can make someone else the owner of a thing he does not own.
- The seller must intend to pass ownership to the buyer.
- Delivery must be made to the buyer (or his agent).
- The buyer must have legal capacity to become owner of the thing.
- The buyer must accept delivery, intending to acquire ownership in the thing.

====== Forms of delivery ======
Delivery may occur in two ways.

====== Actual delivery ======
Actual delivery (traditio vera) occurs where the res vendita is physically handed over by one person to another de manu in manum.

====== Constructive delivery ======
Constructive delivery (traditio ficta) concerns those various methods of transferring ownership by which no physical handing over of the res vendita takes place. There are five methods of constructive delivery:

- shorthand delivery (traditio brevi manu);
- longhand delivery (traditio longa manu);
- constitutum possessorium;
- symbolic delivery (traditio symbolica); and
- attornment.

===== Payment =====
Ownership passes on delivery only if cash is paid, or if credit has been allowed. In Laing v SA Milling Co Ltd, Juta JA said, "On a sale of movables followed by delivery the property does not pass until the purchaser has paid the money or secured the seller for the same, or unless the sale is on credit."

At this juncture, it is important to distinguish between how ownership passes in cash and credit sales respectively. In a cash sale, ownership passes once there has been (in addition to delivery) due payment of the purchase price. In a sale on credit, the fact that credit has been given is an indication that ownership merely passed on delivery. In an ordinary credit sale, the seller cannot claim that he did not intend ownership to pass until the full price had been paid. (This does not cover the situation where the sale is one subject to a pactum reservati dominii).

In the absence of agreement (express or implied) that credit has been granted, it is presumed that every sale is a cash sale. The point is well illustrated in Daniels v Cooper.

The presumption of a cash sale may therefore be rebutted by adducing evidence of an agreement to give credit. If the rebuttal succeeds, ownership passes on delivery. If credit has not been granted, ownership does not pass until the price is paid—even if delivery has, in the meantime, taken place. An agreement to give credit must be clear and specific.

That being said, it is now much more difficult to show an agreement on credit than under the common law. This is so because of legislation. If the sale happens to be one on credit, the requirements of the National Credit Act apply to it.

Where a sale is for cash, and the seller accepts a cheque for payment of the cash price, ownership does not pass (notwithstanding the delivery of the res vendita) unless the cheque is met when presented for payment.

=== Risk and benefit ===
==== Common law ====
In most ordinary, day-to-day commercial transactions, the conclusion of a contract of sale and the passing of ownership by delivery of the res occurs instantaneously. In some types of sale, however, there is a delay between the time of entry into the contract of sale and the time of transfer of possession and ownership. The question that must be answered in these circumstances is this: Who gains the advantage of any benefits accruing to the res, and who bears the risk of damage occurring to it, during this window period?

===== Risk =====
Mackeurtan defines risk as follows:

By risk is meant the loss resulting from damage to, or destruction of, the thing sold, or any other disadvantage accruing to, or affecting it, arising through any agency other than the breach of contract or wrongful act or default of the seller.

Losses that fall within the rule include those due to vis maior, casus fortuitus, general deterioration over time and even theft. Voet says:

Under the name of risk falls here every disadvantage which overtakes a thing sold, such as death; running away and wounding in the case of [...] an animal sold; an opening of the ground in the case of a field [...]; conflagration and collapse in the case of a house; shipwreck in the case of a ship; mustiness, souring or leakage in the case of wine; and finally spoiling, going bad, perishing or purloining in the case of all things.

For a modern example, see Van der Merwe v Viljoen.

Not falling within the rule are losses caused by the failure of the seller to observe the appropriate standard of care.

====== Where the risk lies ======
South Africa follows the Roman-law rule with regard to risk. In the absence of negligence on the part of the seller, the general rule is that the risk passes to the buyer when the sale is perfecta: that is, as soon as the agreement of sale is concluded, and before delivery or payment of the price.

The natural consequence of this rule is that the full price must be paid by the buyer, even though the thing sold is damaged or destroyed before it is handed over.

This general rule applies, however, where:

- The parties have agreed to the contrary
- Specific goods still must be weighed, measured, or counted
- The goods are unascertained
- There is a statutory provision to the contrary
- There is default by either party

The parties may vary the normal rules regarding risk by express agreement in their contract. Courts are loath to accept that such an agreement to vary was implied from the parties' negotiations, although it is possible for this to occur. One salient question here is whether or not an undertaking by the seller to deliver the goods at a specified destination necessarily implies agreement to vary the incidence of the risk. The answer would appear to be no. Why should a mere agreement to deliver at a distance imply a term that risk is to remain with the seller until delivery? The situation would be quite different where the seller undertakes to deliver the thing "safely" to the agreed destination.

The general rule also applies where specific goods must be weighed, measured, or counted. In this regard, a distinction must be drawn between sales ad quantitatem and sales per aversionem. Where the sale is ad quantitatem, there is a sale of specific goods, but the price depends on the counting, weighing or measuring: for example, R300 per sheep, for the flock. The risk does not pass in this case until the price has been ascertained by counting the flock.

Pothier explains the situation in the following way:

If the sale is of things which consist in quantitate, and which are sold by weight, number or measure, as if one sells ten casks of corn [...] ten thousand pounds of sugar, or one hundred carp, the sale is not perfect until the corn is measured, the sugar weighed, or the carp counted [....] For this reason, until the thing is measured, weighed or counted, it does not become at the risk of the buyer; for the risk cannot fall upon some indeterminate thing.

Where the sale is per aversionem, it is, as it were, in the gross. The price is a lump sum for the ascertained goods, even if the res vendita is of a type normally weighed, measured, or counted: for example, a flock of sheep at R10,000 for the lot. Pothier says:

But if the goods are not sold by weight or measure, but per aversionem, that is, in bulk, and for a single and only price; in such case, the sale is perfect from the instant of the contract, and from that time these goods are at the risk of the buyer.

While the situation envisaged in respect of unascertained goods is analogous to that above, the price is usually ascertained, but the res vendita is not. The subject matter has not yet been appropriated to the contract: for example, 100 bags of maize at R55 per bag from a warehouse containing 10,000 bags. Risk in the res vendita does not pass until goods answering the description in the contract have been appropriated to the contract. For appropriation to occur, there must be some overt act by the seller, such as a setting aside or marking of the relevant goods.

The general rule also applies, obviously, where there is a statutory provision to the contrary.

The ordinary rules of risk are altered where a party is in default of his obligations under the contract. The rule varies by

- Fraud of either party
- Failure of the seller to observe the required standard of care
- Default of either party in performance
- The doing of anything by either party that hinders the other in his performance

The rule here is that the presence of one of these factors relieves the injured party of the incidence of risk, save in so far as any damage of the thing may be due to his own misconduct or gross negligence.

===== Benefit =====
Kerr defines benefit as "any natural or civil fruits and other similar advantages, gains or profits." The general rule is that the benefit in the res vendita follows the risk. Any benefits pass to the buyer once the sale is perfecta. This does not, however, include fortuitous gains. The benefit must be directly connected with and actually produced by the property that has been sold. If the profits were purely accidental, and would not have been in the contemplation of the parties at the time of concluding the sale, the buyer cannot claim such a benefit.

==== Consumer Protection Act ====
This area of the law faces significant changes under the Consumer Protection Act.

=== Conditional sales ===
As already indicated, the ordinary rules of the common law regarding the passing of ownership and risk or benefit may be modified if the parties agree to certain conditions.

==== Conditions ====
"The contracting parties," writes Mackeurtan, "may include in their agreement any provisions that they wish, subject to the limitations hereinafter laid down. These may suspend the operation, or cause the dissolution of the contract, until or upon the happening of an uncertain future event [....] The first class are suspensive, and the second resolutive."

Whether a condition is suspensive or resolutive is a matter of construction. The courts look beyond the ipse dixit of the parties and interpret the words as they stand. The following prerequisites must exist for a condition to be operative:

- The coming into force or dissolution of the contract must be made to depend upon the occurrence or non-occurrence of an uncertain future event.
- It must not be impossible, illegal or immoral.
- It must not be subversive of the essentials of the contract.

==== Terms ====
As noted above, conditions proper affect the operation, or bring about the dissolution, of the contract. On the other hand, terms only modify the ordinary effect of the contract. For example, the parties might agree to a term that the ordinary rule of risk is varied.

==== Suspensive conditions ====
The legal effect of suspensive conditions in the law of sale is a matter of some controversy, but effectively the position is this: Unlike other contracts, a contract subject to a suspensive condition only becomes a contract of sale once the condition is fulfilled. Since this is contrary to the common-law position (and, indeed, to logic), the significant types of contracts with the character of a sale, and subject to suspensive conditions, have been covered by legislative amendments, so that the anomaly does not apply. Most of its significant effects in practice have been ameliorated by legislation.

==== Resolutive conditions ====
A valid resolutive condition has the following effect:

- The contract has full legal effect from the moment it is perfecta pending fulfilment of the condition.
- An affirmative resolutive condition is fulfilled by the occurrence of the event; a negative resolutive condition is fulfilled when it is certain that the event will not occur.
- Should the condition be fulfilled, the contract is dissolved retrospectively, and must therefore be regarded as never having existed.

==== Examples ====
The following are examples of commonly-encountered conditional sales.

===== Approval of financial stability or availability of loan =====
A suspensive condition is sometimes found in commercial transactions to the effect that the transaction depends upon the seller's approval of the buyer's financial stability. There is no contract of sale until the seller gives his approval. He must exercise his discretion reasonably and in good faith.

A similar clause is found in a deed of sale, where the sale of land is subject to the conditions that the buyer is able to:

- Sell his previous home (if relevant)
- Get approval for a loan secured by a mortgage bond from a recognised financial services provider within a particular period of time

If it becomes clear the conditions cannot be satisfied, the contract falls through.

===== Sale or return =====
Sale or return (pactum displicentiae) is a type of conditional sale often encountered in practice. It involves the buyer receiving goods from the seller with the option of becoming the owner. He can exercise his option in several ways:

- by buying the goods at the named price;
- by selling the goods to another; or
- by keeping them for so long that it would be unreasonable to return them.

This type of contract could be considered as subject to a condition that suspends the sale until the buyer has done one of the above-mentioned things to indicate his intention to become the buyer. Mackeurtan, however, feels that contracts of sale or return are examples of contracts subject to a resolutive condition.

===== Sales on approval =====
There is some disagreement about approval sales. Some argue that these are sales subject to a suspensive condition: Since the sale is subject to the examination and approval of the buyer, the operation of the sale is suspended until the buyer's approval has been expressed.

There is another view: that these are sales subject to a resolutive condition. On this view, the sale transaction is carried out completely, and the client is charged. If, however, the client feels that the merchandise is no good, he is entitled to return the item to the seller, and the transaction is reversed. In modern-day consumer contracts, this seems to be the better view.

== Residual obligations of the seller and remedies of the buyer ==
=== Seller required to take care of res vendita until merx is made available ===
The discussion of risk above indicates that the risk of accidental loss normally passes to the buyer as soon as the contract of sale is perfecta. This, however, does not release the seller from all responsibility for the thing sold while it remains in his possession. The general rule is that the seller is under an obligation to take care of the thing until the time comes for performance, and that he is responsible for any damage caused by his fraud or negligence. In Frumer v Maitland, Schreiner JA said,

It will be convenient to consider first the obligations of a vendor who has not yet delivered the property sold. It is his duty to look after it as would a bonus paterfamilias and if he fails in that duty the purchaser would be entitled to claim damages, or, if, but only if, the result of the vendor's neglect is that the thing sold is materially different from the thing tendered, to repudiate the contract and to refuse to take delivery."

Where it is the seller who is in mora, the seller becomes liable for all loss, no matter how it comes about. Only if it can be shown that the damage would nonetheless have occurred, even if the thing had been delivered, will the loss be the buyer's.

The extent of the duty to take care pending delivery is altered if the buyer is in mora in taking delivery. If the buyer has failed to take delivery, the seller is only liable for the consequences of his gross negligence (culpa lata) or fraud (dolus). He is not liable for ordinary negligence.

The measure of care may also be varied by agreement.

Where the res vendita has been damaged or lost while in possession of the seller prior to delivery, and the responsibility is not the seller's, he must cede to the buyer any rights of action he might have in respect of the damage, so that the buyer might exercise these rights in covering his own loss. If, for example, the goods are stolen and found in possession of a third party (not the thief), the seller must cede his vindicatory rights to the buyer.

==== The buyer's remedies ====
Where the seller has not taken due care, the remedies available depend on whether the goods are specific or unascertained.

===== Specific goods =====
In the case of specific goods, where the damage is material, the buyer is entitled to refuse to accept delivery of the goods and to repudiate the contract, claim damages, and a refund of the price if paid. In other words, he is entitled to treat the situation as he would non-delivery of the thing. Where the damage is not material, the buyer must accept the delivery of the goods, and then claim damages.

===== Unascertained goods =====
Where the sale is of unascertained goods, the buyer may reject the goods and once again treat the seller as if there had been no delivery at all (whether the breach is major or not), provided the damage is not trifling. Where, however, the purchaser accepts the res vendita, but claims damages, the damages are estimated on the basis of the difference between the value of the sound goods and the value of the damaged goods delivered. The buyer may also claim any wasted necessary expenditure.

=== Seller's duty to make available the thing sold ===
This duty is the same as the duty to "deliver the res vendita," as it is most often described—including in the new Consumer Protection Act. Some prefer Kerr's description. One should understand the terms "making the thing sold available" and "delivery" as being synonymous.

Mackeurtan deals with this matter in great detail, enumerating the six elements of this duty (with semantic variations) as follows:

1. to make the thing available at the agreed time and place;
2. to make the thing available in the condition that it was at the time of sale;
3. to make the thing available in accordance with specifications regarding size, quantity, quality or any other aspect agreed upon in the contract of sale;
4. to make the thing available with all its accessories, appurtenances and fruits;
5. to place the buyer in a position whereby he acquires vacua possessio (undisturbed possession); and
6. to do, at the seller's own expense, whatever is necessary to make the thing sold available to the buyer.

==== Agreed time and place ====
The seller must make the thing available at the time and place stipulated in the contract.

===== Time =====
If no time is stipulated, the res vendita must be made available immediately (if performance is possible at the time of sale), or within a reasonable time (if the process must necessarily take time). The circumstance of each contract determines what is a reasonable time. A seller who fails to make the thing sold available at the appropriate time is in mora.

The seller is not entitled to deliver by instalments if the contract was not to that effect. Where periods are stated for delivery by instalments, though, the seller is bound to deliver as agreed upon.

===== Place =====
The seller must make the thing sold available at the place agreed upon in the contract. If no place is agreed upon, he must make it available at the place where the article is, if it is specific. If the res is unascertained, the seller must make it available at his place of business; if he has no place of business, then at his residence. If the thing is ordered to be manufactured, the thing must be made available at the place of manufacture, in the absence of any agreement to the contrary.

==== Same condition as at time of sale ====
In Frumer v Maitland, Schreiner JA noted that, "The appellant was entitled to delivery of the house in a state not materially different from that in which it was at the date of the contract."

==== In accordance with specifications ====
The rules regarding this element are protean. The following discussion considers only two facets.

First, it should be pointed out that, where sales are concluded by sample, such a contract contains an express warranty that the bulk of the goods conform to the sample. If the final consignment does not comply, the warranty is breached, and the buyer has an actio empti, and a full range of contractual remedies, including (where appropriate) a claim for damages.

Secondly, as Volpe puts it, "The seller may not make available more or less than the amount stated in the contract, nor the contract goods mixed with others of a different description."

In Cedarmount Store v Webster & Co, Wessels JP held,

According to our law [...] a contract to deliver at one and the same time a number of articles of a particular quality is prima facie an entire contract, and the seller has no right to alter the nature of the contract. ASi in emptione modus dictus est et non-praestatur ex emptio actus est. It is based upon the principle that a creditor cannot be compelled to accept a partial payment or a part performance of a contract. Although the subject matter of the contract is physically capable of division, yet from the legal point of view the obligation is a payment of the entire sum due or a number to be delivered [....] There is no duty cast upon a purchaser to separate the bad part of a consignment from that of the good. As soon as he satisfies himself that out of a large number of bags there is an unreasonable number defective, he is, prima facie, entitled to reject the lot."

There is some dispute about the powers of a purchaser with regard to violations of this requirement.

==== With all accessories, appurtenances and fruits ====
Mackeurtan defines these words as follows:

- Accessories "are those things which, though capable in the abstract of separate conception, in fact form an integral portion of the principal thing, and lose their individual existence." He gives the following examples of accessories: anything that springs organically from an object (trees, etc.), and anything attached to the principal thing in a permanent manner (buildings on land, an arm on a statue, etc.). Accessories are identifiable by the nature of the thing, the way they are attached to the principal object, and the intention of the one who attached it.
- Appurtenances "are its auxiliaries, which are not absolutely identified with it, but share its destiny, legal conditions and relations." They are naturally adapted to serve and augment permanently the utility of the principal thing. Examples would be the keys to a chest, the sheath of a sword or the bottle containing liquor.
- The seller must also make the thing sold available with any fruits accrued to it since the sale was perfecta. The important date is that on which the benefit passes. Natural fruits include all natural products of the thing, including anything extracted from it (crops from land sold, for example), while civil fruits refer to any pecuniary advantage that accrues to the thing (for example, interest and rents).

==== Vacua possessio ====
This obligation means, first, that the seller must make the thing available in such a manner that no-one is alleging any immediate right of possession over the res. In other words, at the time the thing is made available, the buyer must acquire free and undisturbed possession.

Secondly, it means that the seller must make available the thing sold in such a way that no-one in future can establish a superior legal right to the thing against the buyer. This particular part of the seller's obligation involves the warranty against eviction.

==== Whatever is necessary to make the thing sold available ====
This obligation may be subdivided into a number of duties.

Where the res vendita comprises unascertained goods, the seller must appropriate them to the contract and ensure that the quantity and description and quality of the goods thus appropriated are in accordance with the terms of the contract.

If anything has to be done to the res vendita to put it in a deliverable state, the seller is responsible for doing so at his own expense.

The seller must, if the buyer requires this, give the latter reasonable opportunity to examine the thing prior to acceptance.

The seller must give notice to the buyer of the fact that the thing is available, if the buyer cannot reasonably be expected to appropriate the thing without such notice.

==== Buyer's remedies ====
Mackeurtan writes,

The seller of goods may be in default as regards his duty to deliver, either by not delivering at all, or by delivering goods other than, or more or less than, those bought, or because he has tendered the goods at an improper time or place. He may have repudiated his obligations. He may have broken his warranty against eviction, or his obligation to take care of the goods until delivery [....] These are clearly breaches of contract for which the buyer's remedies are contractual."

The nature of remedies for breach of this residual duty are particularly detailed and complex. A brief summary is given here, based on Kerr's discussion.

===== Specific performance =====
The buyer has a right to demand the thing sold to him (subject, of course, to the court's discretion to refuse it). The remedy is available to a buyer who rejects the tender of goods as being inappropriate. As we have seen, a buyer, having received less than what he contracted to receive, may prefer to accept what was tendered, but sue for the balance to be produced.

===== Cancellation =====
Failure to make the goods available in a contract of sale is a major breach. It entitles the buyer to cancel the contract. In Landau v City Auction Mart, Watermeyer JA said,

I can find nothing in Roman-Dutch law which stands in the way of an order being made in favour of a purchaser for cancellation of a contract of sale and repayment of the price by reason of a refusal by the defendant to deliver the property sold.

===== Damages =====
If the seller fails to make the goods available, damages may be awarded (with or without cancellation, depending on the circumstances and type of breach), according to the general principles of contract.

=== Seller's duty to transfer ownership ===
The seller has a duty to transfer ownership if he has it, or can obtain it, failing which, his duty is to warrant the buyer against eviction.

==== Transfer of ownership ====
The seller, as noted before, need not be the owner of the thing he is selling. In most circumstances, he is, though, and is therefore obliged to transfer ownership. This duty, although seeming to amount to common sense, has been a source of some debate in South African law. In particular, uncertainty has been caused by statements made by Wessels JA in the case of Kleynhans Brothers v Wessels Trustee. This debate is considered in due course.

Should a seller mala fide fail to transfer ownership, the buyer has an action ex empto for transfer of ownership, as soon as he discovers the true position.

==== Warranty against eviction ====
Again, the seller is normally the owner of the property. He is expected to transfer this ownership as part of the sale. What happens, however, in the situation where someone bona fide believes he is the owner of the thing he is selling, but in fact is not? Such sales are, of course, valid, but ever since Roman days the law has said that a person who buys and takes possession of property from such a seller has no action unless and until he is threatened with eviction by someone with better legal title to the property (usually the true owner). The action arises in such circumstances out of what is known as the warranty against eviction. The warranty requires of the seller that he do whatever is legally possible to protect the buyer in his possession of the res vendita. An inability to do so renders him liable under this warranty. The warranty is obliquely re-articulated in the Consumer Protection Act.

Three basic requirements must be met before the seller becomes liable on the buyer's eviction:

1. Eviction
2. Notice
3. Determined defence

===== Eviction =====
Voet states, "Eviction is the recovery by judicial process of our property, which the opponent has acquired by iustus titulus." In present times the word has a much wider connotation than that given in Voet's definition. It means any lawful interference with vacua possessio, by seller or third party. In Norman's Purchase and Sale, it is said that eviction

thus includes a demand on the part of a third person to hand over the property sold to him if the purchaser is unable to resist such a claim; the refusal of the person in possession of the property to relinquish it to the purchaser; the demand for payment of a sum of money by the purchaser in order to retain the whole or portion of the res vendita; and conceivably the existence of a concealed servitude over the property which interferes with the use and possession of the property. In short anything which weakens the purchaser's right to the whole or a portion of the thing sold, or which constitutes a menace to his right of having free and undisturbed possession.

The seller is not liable for any unlawful interference with the buyer's possession. Liability only arises if the interference is the result of a flaw in the seller's title. The flaw must have existed at the time of sale or, if it arose subsequently to the sale, be due to the seller's own act. Eviction, therefore, does not include situations where the sale is set aside by the court, or if the property is attached by the seller's creditors before ownership passed.

The warranty begins to operate as soon as the buyer's vacua possessio is threatened.

"The idea of eviction," writes Volpe, "has also been extended to cater for successive sales: the repayment of the purchase price to the purchaser who has been evicted is equated in that situation with the seller's own eviction and serves as such when the seller looks next to the one from whom he himself bought."

Thus Kerr writes, "The facts of Olivier v Van der Bergh [...] and Louis Botha Motors v James Slabbert Motors [...] show that it is not uncommon for A to sell to B and B to C (possession being transferred in both cases) before the true owner makes his claim. These decisions show that once a claim has been made against C and he has surrendered the thing sold, whether after judgment or because he can show that the claimant has an unassailable right he may claim compensation from B and B may claim from A. C may not, in the absence of cession, claim direct from A."

In cases where there has been a string of successive sales, however, intermediate parties who have bought and then sold goods on to other parties do have the locus standi to bring proceedings to determine whether the person claiming a right to the property has a legitimate right to do so.

The action on the warranty also arises where the res vendita or part of it is in the possession of a third party, and the buyer is unable to obtain it.

===== Notice =====
As soon as eviction is threatened, the buyer is required to give the seller notice of the third party's claim to possession of the thing. The seller has to be given adequate notice to fulfil his obligation to protect the buyer's possession. The duties of the seller are somewhat unclear, but it seems that he is expected to intervene in the action, and take up the defence against the other party claiming title. It is the seller's duty under the warranty to relieve the buyer of the risks and costs of court action. If the buyer fails to give the necessary notice, he has no recourse against the seller unless he can prove that the third party's right is incontestable, or that it is the seller's fault that the notice did not reach him in time.

The buyer is relieved of this duty when:

- The title of the third party claiming the thing is legally unassailable;
- The parties have expressly agreed that notice is not required
- Notice is not given owing to the seller's own fault
- The seller has sold property mala fide, in which case the seller is liable for fraud in terms of the actio ex empto

===== Determined defence =====
The buyer, faced with eviction, is required in most circumstances to put up a determined defence (virilis defensio) of his possession, unless he can prove that the claimant's title was legally unassailable. This must be done when the seller has failed to assist the buyer, either because he cannot be found, or because he refused to assist.

==== The buyer's remedies ====
Kerr states that a buyer claiming under the warranty is entitled to repayment of the purchase price (or whatever portion has been paid) and, if loss over and above the amount can be shown, compensation for such loss. The action is a contractual one, which is sued for by means of the actio empti.

Being a bona fide possessor, the buyer could also claim for any improvements made to the property, this from the true owner.

Where eviction is partial only, and insufficient to entitle the buyer to claim rescission, he is entitled to claim the difference between the value of the property at eviction and the value of what is left to him.

The warranty is residual. One may contract out of it, if this is possible.

=== Duty to make res vendita available free from defects ===
The seller is required to make the thing sold available without defects or diseases.

Where the seller makes the res available with a defect, a number of considerations determine the nature and extent of the remedy available to the buyer. In any defect case, one needs to consider two critical things:

1. the nature of the defect (whether it is a patent or a latent defect); and
2. the nature of the remedy.

In certain circumstances, the buyer's remedy is clearly contractual (enforceable in terms of the actio empti). In other circumstances, the remedies are not contractual; they find their roots in the aedilitian actions of Roman law. The extent of relief available differs, depending upon which remedy applies. Historically, contractual actions entitle the buyer to consequential damages, while the aedilitian remedies do not. While some decisions do not specify which remedy is referred to, the differences in the nature of the remedies remain important.

==== Patent defects ====
Patent defects are defects obvious to the naked eye: easily discoverable by the buyer at the time the goods are received. An example would be a scab on a sheep. Where specific goods are identified, or unascertained goods are appropriated by the seller to the contract, and the goods suffer from a patent defect, the seller may be sued for breach of contract by defective performance. The remedies are therefore contractual; consequential damages may be claimed.

Where the buyer has inspected the res vendita at (or before) the time of sale, and the inspection ought to have disclosed a defect, and the buyer accepts the goods without objection, the seller is not liable provided he has not warranted (expressly or impliedly) the absence of the defect, nor fraudulently concealed it. The reasoning behind this rule is that the buyer has waived his remedies by his conduct. He is deemed to have bought the goods subject to the defect, which he ought to have discovered.

==== Latent defects ====
In Holmdene Brickworks (Pty) Ltd v Roberts Construction Co Ltd Corbett JA defined a latent defect as follows:

Broadly speaking in this context a latent defect may be described as an abnormal quality or attribute which destroys or substantially impairs the utility or effectiveness of the res vendita for the purpose for which it was sold or for which it is commonly used [....] Such a defect is latent when it is one which is not visible or discoverable upon an inspection of the res vendita."

In other words, a latent defect would not be apparent to an ordinary person, even if an expert might have discovered it. Where the seller makes the thing sold available, and it is discovered that the thing has a latent defect, the seller is liable to the buyer in four circumstances. The first three categories allow an aggrieved party a contractual remedy: that is, an actio empti, which includes a claim for consequential loss or id quod interesse. The fourth category provides for aedilitian relief.

The four categories are:

1. where the seller has acted fraudulently, or mala fide;
2. where the seller has warranted the absence of a latent defect;
3. where the seller is an artifex, manufacturer or seller, or is a dealer professing attributes of skill and expert knowledge in relation to the thing; and
4. where the aedilitian actions are available.

===== Fraud =====
Regarding mala fides on the part of the seller, Glaston House (Pty) Ltd v Inag (Pty) Ltd.

===== Warranty =====
Where the seller has given an express or implied warranty against the existence of the defect, or has warranted the fitness of the res vendita for the purpose for which it is bought, the seller is liable. The action is contractual. The case provides a useful distinction between contractual and aedilitian remedies for latent defects.

===== Skill and expert knowledge =====
The leading cases are Kroonstad Westelike Boere Ko-operatiewe Vereeninging v Botha and Another, Holmdene Brickworks, Sentrachem Bpk v Weinhold, Langeberg Voedsel Bpk v Sarculum Boerdery Bpk, Sentrachem Ltd v Prinsloo Ciba-Geigy (Pty) Ltd v Lushof Farms (Pty) Ltd and D&H Piping Systems (Pty) Ltd v Trans Hex Group Ltd See also section 61 of the Consumer Protection Act.

===== Aedilitian actions =====
A seller is also liable for latent defects in the merx in terms of the aedilitian actions. The curule aediles were the Roman magistrates in charge of markets and public works. They had the power to issue edicts. Their most famous edict concerned a seller's liability for latent defects. Ulpian said,

Labeo writes that the edict of the curule aediles applies as well to sales of land as to sales of chattels inanimate or animate. The aediles say: "Sellers of slaves are to inform buyers of any disease (morbus) or defect (vitium) in any slave and whether any slave is a runaway, a vagabond, or not free from noxal liability; all these matters they must declare with proper publicity when the slave shall be sold. But if a slave was sold in contravention of the foregoing or in contravention of what was stated or promised when he was being sold [...] we grant to the buyer [...] an action for redhibition of the slave [....] The motive for the proposition of this edict is to defeat the artifices of sellers and to assist buyers whenever they are cheated by sellers. It is however, to be understood that a seller, even though he was unaware of the existence of faults [...] must nevertheless be held liable. Nor is this unfair, for the seller was in a position to inform himself on these matters, while to the buyer it makes no difference as to whether his deception is due to the seller's ignorance or guile.

The seller's obligations and the buyer's rights in terms of the aedilitian actions arise ex lege by operation of law, not with reference to the contract itself. One must not refer to an implied warranty against defects being present.

The aedilitian actions are the actio redhibitoria and the actio quanti minoris, both of which are available in South African law. Each action provides the aggrieved buyer with certain specific remedies. Each has some similar elements:

The actions are available (in the case of defects)

- if at the time of the sale the thing suffers from a disease or defect; and
- if it was sold "in contravention of the edict" (adversus ea); in other words, if there has been non-disclosure of the defect or disease.

====== Defects and diseases ======
This matter is canvassed by Kerr. There is little need, then, to detail it here. As far as defects are concerned, Corbett JA's words in Holmdene still apply. The remedies lie only if the disease or defect existed at the time of sale. Kerr says,

Aedilitian actions do not lie if the thing sold was sound at the time of the sale although it had suffered previously from a disease or defect. It is important that it should be wholly sound, not merely a defective part that should have been repaired or replaced [....] Just as the actions do not lie if the thing, having previously been diseased or defective is sound at the time of sale, so also they do not lie if the thing was sound at the time of sale but became diseased and defective thereafter.

The existence of the disease or defect at the time of the sale is a question of fact that the buyer must prove on the balance of probabilities. An inference that the disease or defect existed at the time of sale may be drawn from the fact that the disease or defect manifests itself shortly after the sale.

Obviously the buyer does not have to prove that the defect was apparent at the time of sale. Where the subject matter of the sale is a class of goods (bags of maize, for example, or pockets of oranges), the aedilitian remedies apply. Yet the extent to which the buyer is entitled to redhibition is determined by whether the contract was divisible or indivisible. Mackeurtan states: "The redhibition to which the purchaser is entitled extends only to the affected articles, unless the contract may properly be regarded as an indivisible one for the sale of the articles as a whole."

====== Adversus ea ======
The seller must sell the property in contravention of the edict; in other words, must defy the requirements of the edict by failing to disclose the existence of the defect. The ordinary rules of non-disclosure apply here, but the facts of the case determine which of the two actions is appropriate.

The actio redhibitoria is an action for the cancellation of the contract and restitution. It involves the restoration of the parties (buyer and seller) to their original positions, as far as this is possible. One is not entitled to a claim for one's consequential loss (id quod interesse) in terms of this remedy.

The test to determine whether the buyer is entitled to redhibition is objective. In Reid Brothers v Bosch, the test was expressed in two ways:

1. A buyer is entitled to rescission of the contract if the defect is of such a nature as to render the article completely unfit for the purpose for which it was bought (for everyone, not just the specific buyer).
2. A reasonable buyer would not have bought it at all had he known of the defect.

In other words, the defect must be material if it is to justify redhibition. Whether the buyer is entitled to redhibitory or quanti minoris relief depends, therefore, on the seriousness of the defect. The defect must not be merely trifling—it must hinder or prevent the usefulness or serviceability of the thing—if it is to justify complete redhibition.

If redhibition is applicable, the buyer is entitled to a refund of the purchase price, plus interest, and of course reimbursement for useful or necessary improvements made to the res. The buyer is obliged, however, to inform the seller of the defect, and to tender a return of the thing (plus accessories, appurtenances and fruits).

The buyer's right to redhibitory relief is terminated in the following circumstances:

- where he uses the article in such a way as to make it impossible to return it to the seller;
- where it has been destroyed or damaged materially due to the buyer's negligence;
- where the buyer fails to discover the defect and to return the thing within a reasonable time after the discovery of the defect (or the time when the defect should reasonably have been discovered); and
- where the buyer, knowing of the defect, exercises rights of ownership over the article (for example, where he arranges to have it repaired).

Where the article has been destroyed as a result of the defect itself, or in the course of its normal use, or accidentally, the buyer is still entitled to redhibitory relief.

The actio quanti minoris (also known as the actio aestimatoria) is the other action to be considered here: an action for the return of a portion of the purchase price. The actio quanti minoris may be sought as a remedy in two circumstances.

In the first instance, the basic requirements for an actio redhibitoria are the same as those that give rise to the actio quanti minoris. Wherever such circumstances are present as justify complete redhibition, the buyer has an election to choose which of the two actions he prefers. If he has this choice, he may

- restore the thing and claim the price paid; or
- retain the thing and reclaim part of the purchase price.

The actio quanti minoris may also be sought in a second set of circumstances. Where the defect is of such a character that it is not material enough to give rise to a redhibitory action, it may nevertheless give rise to an actio quanti minoris. A buyer may therefore claim a reduction in the purchase price if (despite the defect) he would still have entered into the contract, but at a lower price. A buyer may sue for a redhibitory action, claiming quanti minoris damages in the alternative.

When the actio quanti minoris is used, the buyer, if successful, is entitled to the return of a portion of the purchase price. The actual amount is calculated on the basis of the difference between the purchase price and the actual value of the thing sold.

The calculation of the award in current South African law is different from that of Roman law, where the amount awarded would be calculated on the basis of the difference between the price actually given and the price the purchaser would have paid if he had known of the defect. It is, in other words, a subjective test. In South African law, the measure of relief is usually the difference between the actual purchase price and the value of the article in its defective state. The value of the defective thing must be ascertained as it is in the case of failure to make available the thing sold: by reference to the market price, if there is one. If no market price can be established, the best evidence available must be used to establish the actual value of the thing sold. Another means of assessing the amount recoverable is by referring to the cost of repairing the defect that existed at the time of sale and/or remedying any deterioration that might have occurred as a result of the defect. Only reasonable costs of repair may be taken into account in this regard.

A measure of controversy exists as to the date to be used when determining the actual value of the thing sold. After considering the cases, Kerr comes to the conclusion that the relevant date is the date when the sale took place.

Where the sale involves a res vendita, consisting of a number of articles, and one or more of them is defective, the quanti minoris relief exists only in respect of the defective articles. If the sale is indivisible, however, the buyer is entitled to relief only if a valuation of all the articles, both defective and sound, clearly shows that he has received less than he has contracted for.

The right to claim quanti minoris damages is lost where the buyer, knowing of the defect, accepts the article as satisfactory in terms of the contract.

====== The aedilitian remedies as defences ======
Circumstances that entitle the buyer to redhibition, or to a reduction of the purchase price, entitles him to defend, on the basis of these facts, actions for payment of the purchase price, or any other action arising out of the contract. When the buyer is sued by the seller, therefore, he is entitled to deny liability and claim redhibitory relief as a defence if the defect is material. The same rules apply as above. This is known as the exceptio redhibitoria.

Circumstances that give cause for an actio quanti minoris may also be used as a defence to an action for the price by the seller. This is called the exceptio quanti minoris.

==== Exclusion of liability for defects ====
The following are circumstances in which the seller is not liable for latent defects in the res vendita:

1. where, in terms of the contract, the seller expressly excludes liability (where, that is, he sells voetstoots);
2. where the seller's liability is impliedly excluded in terms of the contract;
3. where the defect arose after the date of sale;
4. where the buyer knew of the defect at the time of sale, or, having become aware of it later, expressly or impliedly accepts the position (thus waiving his remedies);
5. where the remedy has expired (for example, by prescription); and
6. where aedilitian remedies are not available to buyers in respect of goods sold at judicial sales in execution.

The only of these circumstances to be examined in detail here is the first.

It is competent for the parties to agree that the seller shall not be liable for the presence of diseases or defects. The most famous example is the voetstoots clause. Where the thing is sold voetstoots, it is sold "with all its faults" or "as it stands" or "as it is." The term must expressly form part of the contract; it cannot be implied.

The effect of such a sale is that the seller is not liable for defects in the res vendita. Where there is an inspection of the thing by an expert, this does not necessarily make the sale voetstoots. The voetstoots clause affects only the presence of latent diseases and defects; it does not cover the situation where a misrepresentation of any kind is made.

One big exception attaches to the voetstoots clause. A voetstoots clause does not relieve the seller of responsibility for a defective res vendita when the seller has acted fraudulently, since no-one can contract out of fraud.

There has been some polemic between the Natal courts, and those in the Transvaal and the Cape, as to what is meant by fraud in this context. Following a note by Milne, the Natal courts took the view that a seller who knew of the defect, and yet sold voetstoots, was not fraudulent unless he designedly concealed the defect from the purchaser. The Cape and Transvaal courts, however, held that knowledge of the defect coupled with a voetstoots clause was in itself sufficient to render the seller fraudulent.

These difficulties were finally cleared up by the Appellate Division in Van der Merwe v Meades. The latest case on the point is Odendaal v Ferraris.

There is also some debate about the effect of the Consumer Protection Act on the voetstoots clause.

Where there is an express term of the contract in apparent conflict with a voetstoots clause, a question arises as to whether the buyer has an action against the seller. The answer depends on the ambit of the term in the circumstances. If the term extends beyond the field of aedilitian liability, the voetstoots clause may not assist the seller. For example, a second-hand car is sold, the seller having guaranteed that the car has a new camshaft, and the car is sold voetstoots. If the seller delivers the car with a new camshaft, he is not liable for latent defects in that new camshaft. If the camshaft is not new, however, the buyer has the usual remedies for breach of contract, which have nothing to do with aedilitian remedies.

National Credit Act excludes the possibility of a valid voetstoots clause in a sale subject to that Act.

==== Dicta et promissa ====
The Romans recognised that, where a seller made a statement amounting to a dictum et promissum, and where the res vendita did not measure up to that statement, the buyer was entitled to aedilitian relief. In such cases, there is no latent defect; the problem comes in that the concept of the thing created in the buyer's mind by the seller's dictum et promissum is different from the true character of the thing. These remedies are relevant where a representation is made, but it falls short of a contractual warranty.

In South African law, despite any distinctions between dicta and promissa in the Roman law, the term refers to, "a statement or undertaking or promise by the seller which was intended to be acted upon by the parties." The leading case on dictum promissumve is Phame (Pty) Ltd v Paizes, Holmes JA posed one of the questions raised by the case in the following way: "Can an innocent misrepresentation ever entitle a buyer to a reduction of the price under the actio quanti minoris? [...] If so, under what circumstances? In other words, what factual foundation is required?"

The answer, as he saw it, was this:

What has to be considered is not innocent misrepresentation per se, but the dictum et promissum of the Roman-Dutch law and the consequential aedilitian relief [....] It is both unnecessary and confusing to try to fit a dictum et promissum into some modern juristic niche like a warranty or term; and then to draw conclusions therefrom as to the buyer's rights. The Roman-Dutch authorities in particular do not require this.

Those authorities he described as "simple and clear" on the point:

If there is a latent defect, at the time of sale, ipso facto the aedilitian remedy is available (unless excluded by agreement). The seller's obligation and the buyer's right arise by operation of law, and not by reference to the intention of the parties [....] Similarly, if during the negotiations the seller made a dictum et promissum bearing on the quality of the res vendita and it falls short of it ipso facto the aedilitian remedy is available, by operation of law.

In summary, "on a conspectus of all the [...] authorities, decisions and discussions," he considered the law in South Africa on this question to be as follows:

1. "The aedilitian remedies [...] are available if the res vendita suffered from a latent defect at the time of the sale."
2. "The aedilitian remedies are also available if the seller made a dictum et promissum to the buyer on the faith of which the buyer entered into the contract or agreed to the price in question; and it turned out to be unfounded."
3. A dictum et promissum is a material statement made by the seller to the buyer during the negotiations, bearing on the quality of the res vendita and going beyond mere praise and commendation."
4. "Whether a statement by the seller goes beyond mere praise and commendation depends on the circumstances of each case. Relevant considerations could include the following: whether the statement was made in answer to a question from the buyer; its materiality to the known purpose for which the buyer was interested in purchasing; whether the statement was one of fact or of personal opinion; and whether it would be obvious even to the gullible that the seller was merely singing the praises of his wares, as sellers have ever been wont to do."

Point 4 above makes it quite clear that a mere puff does not amount to a dictum et promissum.

See also Gannet Manufacturing Co (Pty) Ltd v Postaflex (Pty) Ltd.

== Buyer's residual obligations ==
=== Payment of purchase price ===
==== Manner of payment ====
The buyer is required to pay the purchase price in the manner agreed upon in the contract. This is certainly his most important duty. Should the contract say nothing specific in this regard, the obligation must be established in terms of the previous course of dealings between the parties, or by relevant trade usage. Failing these, as Mackeurtan notes, "he must pay it in legal tender." Payment may be made by cheque, depending upon its being honoured. Performance other than of what is due (called substituted performance, or datio in solutum) may be rendered if the creditor consents; if he does consent, and the payment is so rendered, the obligation is validly discharged.

==== Time of payment ====
===== Cash sales =====
In the absence of agreement to the contrary, both parties are obliged to perform as soon as the contract is entered into. The buyer must tender payment, therefore, when the seller is bound to make available the thing sold. In Breytenbach v Van Wyk, Wessels JA said, "In a sale for cash the article must be delivered pari passu with the payment of the purchase price."

===== Credit sales =====
A particular day may be agreed upon for payment; if not, payment must be made within a reasonable time. Where delivery by instalments is agreed upon, the buyer is prima facie required to pay the correct portion of the price on delivery of each instalment.

==== Place of payment ====
The buyer is required to pay the price at the place fixed in the contract. Where no place has been fixed, the buyer is required to ensure that payment reaches the creditor on or before the due date.

==== Payment by whom? ====
In ordinary circumstances the buyer is responsible for the price, but payment by a third party (either on behalf of the debtor, or as surety or co-debtor) also discharges the obligation.

=== Removal or receipt ===
The buyer has a duty to remove the thing when it is made available by the seller, or to receive it if it is brought to him. The classic statement of this duty is that of Pomponius: "If a man buys the stone on an estate and refuses to remove it, an action on sale may be brought to enforce removal."

Where a buyer fails to remove or receive the thing timeously, he is in mora. This has implications for the burden of the risk and entitles the seller to reimbursement for necessary expenditure in the upkeep and storage of the res vendita.

=== Reimbursement of necessary expenses ===
The buyer is required to reimburse the seller for any expenses necessarily incurred in caring for the res vendita between the date of sale and the seller's making the thing available. This duty corresponds to the seller's duty to take due care of the thing until it is made available; it also corresponds with his duty to account to the buyer for fruits of the res vendita from the date of sale. Examples of this type of expenses include the cost of warehousing, necessary repairs, taxes, maintenance and keep (the cost of a nightwatchman, for example, to ensure the safety of the res vendita), or monies spent on the veterinary treatment of an animal.

=== Seller's remedies ===
The seller's remedies where the buyer fails to fulfil one or more of these obligations are numerous and detailed.

== Sales subject to statutory requirements ==
Various statutes regulate the way certain common forms of sale contracts must be concluded and performed. These statutes provide a gloss (and, in some cases, a significant alteration) to the common law of sale discussed thus far. For the most part, these pieces of legislation are designed with consumer protection in mind. They impose formalities upon contracts, and they stipulate what sorts of terms are lawful or unlawful.

The following are significant pieces of legislation:

- the Alienation of Land Act, which requires contracts for the sale of land to be in writing and signed, and imposes various other formalities on such contracts.
- the Electronic Communications and Transactions Act, which imposes strict consumer protection measures on such contracts, and regulates contractual terms attached to such contracts, especially in Chapter 7 of the Act;
- the Insolvency Act, requires that, where sales of businesses are to occur, certain notices be published to ensure the validity of the sale;
- the Second-Hand Goods Act, which requires certain formalities if goods are to be bought and sold on a second-hand basis;
- the Stock-Theft Act, which regulates the sale of stock;
- the National Credit Act; and
- the Consumer Protection Act, which was signed into law on 24 April 2009, and which came into force on 31 March 2011.

== See also ==
- Law of conveyancing in South Africa
- Law of South Africa
- Lease
- South African contract law
- South African property law
