= Ponelat v Schrepfer =

South African legal case

Ponelat v Schrepfer is an important recent case in South African law, with ramifications particularly in the area of universal partnerships, in which the Supreme Court of Appeal (SCA) dismissed an appeal against an order of the Eastern Circuit Local Division High Court.

== Facts ==
The court a quo had found a tacit universal partnership to have existed between the appellant, Hans Gunter Ponelat, and the respondent, Erica Schrepfer.

From 1989 to 2005, the appellant and the respondent lived together as man and wife, sharing a joint household, first in Benoni and then in Plettenberg Bay. In the course of their relationship, the respondent contributed all she had to the joint household, financially and physically, together with the proceeds of the sale of her assets, her salary, her time, her energy, her labour, her skills and her expertise. The appellant contributed his electrical business, financed the various properties owned by the parties and provided financial security for them. The respondent also assisted with the administration of the appellant's business, and provided for his needs and comfort. After they moved to Plettenberg Bay, the respondent assisted with administration on the farm and in providing accommodation for tourists.

The relationship between the parties came to an end on April 1, 2005, whereafter the respondent moved into a flat of her own. The question before the court on appeal was whether a tacit universal partnership could be inferred from the proven facts.

== Judgment ==
The SCA held that the nature of the discussions between the parties prior to their cohabitating, and their intent during their years together, indicated that they had the requisite animus contrahendi to form a universal partnership. The essentials of a contract of universal partnership had been established:

- Each party had brought something into the partnership;
- the partnership had been carried on for their joint benefit; and
- the object had been to make a profit.

The SCA accordingly concurred with the trial court's decision that a universal partnership had come into being in March 1989 and was terminated on April 1, 2005.

== See also ==
- South African law of partnerships and trusts
