= East London Model Dairy Co-Operative v Toyk =

East London Model Dairy Co-Operative v Toyk is an important case in South African law. An action for an order cancelling a sale, and for the refund of the purchase price, it was heard in the Eastern Districts Local Division by De Villiers J November 9, 10 and 11, 1954, with judgment handed down on December 9. The plaintiffs' attorneys were RG White, Gillett & McConnachie. The defendant's attorneys were Segal & Pincus. AW Back, QC (with him TM Mullins), appeared for the plaintiff; NC Addleson for the defendant

The case concerned a contract for the sale of land, and a subsequent attempt to cancel it. The seller had sub-divided a residential area for business purposes. This the local council had approved, subject to a road service restriction. The administrator did not agree to rezoning, and the seller granted a road service restriction. The council imposed a building line restriction and refused to delete the road service condition. The deed had embodied both restrictions. The purchaser, prior in time, cancelled the sale, and the road service restriction fell away when the rezoning was refused. The court ruled that the council was not entitled to retain both restrictions. The seller was accordingly forced to pass transfer unrestricted, and the purchaser was entitled to reclaim the purchase price.

== Facts ==
The defendant, the owner of a block of ground, had carried on a dairy business on a portion thereof. This business, with the land on which the buildings stood, together with another small portion, he had sold to the plaintiff. The defendant had undertaken to have the ground subdivided so as to give transfer of the land sold. He accordingly applied for a sub-divisional diagram for four lots, three of them to be accorded business rights. As a condition of approval and of these rights, the East London City Council had imposed a condition of a service road. The Administrator had, however, refused to agree to the rezoning of the three lots from residential to business purposes. The defendant then requested the Council to state its conditions in respect of two of the lots so as to enable transfer to be passed. In addition he applied for the existing use of the dairy on Lot 2 to be agreed to. The Council agreed to the latter but imposed a condition of a fifteen-foot building line: that is, a line forbidding the erection of any building or structure nearer than fifteen feet from the street forming the boundary of the lot. No mention was made of a service road.

The defendant had in the meantime completed a notarial deed in favour of the Council creating a service road over Lot 2. The defendant, having regard to the imposition of the building line restriction, requested the Council to consent to the cancellation of the service road, which it refused to do. The defendant then caused a notarial deed to be redrafted embodying the fifteen-foot service road and the other conditions. Transfer of Lot 2 was then passed in favour of the plaintiff subject, inter alia, to the fifteen-foot building line and the service road. As the defendant refused to free the lot of the restriction relating to the service road, granted after the sale but before transfer, the plaintiff instituted proceedings cancelling the sale and sued for the return of the purchase price of the land and buildings plus the costs and expenses.

== Argument ==
Counsel for the plaintiff contended that there were, at the date of sale, no encumbrances on the portion purchased; nor were any referred to in the deed. The plaintiff was therefore entitled to a clean transfer. The plaintiff had not waived his right to a clean transfer. The onus of any waiver is on the defendant. The seller may not impose a servitude after the sale. The buildings as provided in the agreement were not delivered inasmuch as one building lay entirely within the space imposed as a servitude of road: This, the plaintiff argued, would have to be removed. The plaintiff, then, had not obtained what he contracted for. The plaintiff disputed the claim, as pleaded, that there had been any common intention, or a bona fide mutual error. Nor did any ground for rectification exist: To obtain rectification, the defendant must establish

1. a prior agreement or common intention that the term should be in the contract in the sense alleged;
2. a bona fide mutual error; and
3. a continuing common intention.

The agreement had been drawn up by the defendant. If there were any omissions or mistakes, the plaintiff contended, the defendant would be to blame. A servitude exacted from the defendant for other purposes, such as to improve amenities at the plaintiff's expense, was neither contemplated nor covered in clause 7.

NC Addleson, for the defendant, argued that the plaintiff was not entitled to cancellation unless he could show that the property was now not suitable for the purposes for which it was bought. The test is objective, Addleson argued, and Van Wyk v Currey NO had been incorrectly decided, insofar as it holds that it is not necessary to prove materiality of the breach where a servitude is imposed. The plaintiff, furthermore, had not shown that the breach was material.

Alternatively, Addleson argued that the Council had imposed the condition in question in the exercise of its statutory powers, and that the plaintiff could not resile by reason of such condition. The Council was legally entitled to impose these conditions under section 230 of the Cape Municipal Ordinance. The condition was germane to the question of sub-division.

Alternatively, Addleson argued that the parties had intended the sale to be subject to such conditions as the Council might impose.

== Judgment ==
The court held that, when the rezoning became impossible, the grant of the road service fell away. The Council, furthermore, was not entitled to retain the road service restriction in addition to the building line condition. The court also held that, when the defendant had requested the cancellation of the road-service grant, the Council should have granted it. Accordingly, it was within the defendant's power to have passed transfer free of the restriction.

== See also ==
- South African law of sale and lease
