= Robinson v Randfontein Estates Gold Mining =

South African legal case

Robinson v Randfontein Estates Gold Mining Co Ltd is an important case in South African law. It was heard in the Appellate Division from 13 to 20 December 1920, with judgment handed down on 19 February 1921. Innes CJ, Solomon JA, CG Maasdorp JA, Juta JA and Bristowe AJA presided.

== Facts ==
The plaintiff company had a lease of the mineral rights in a farm. The defendant was the chairman of the board of directors of the company. The defendant was mandated to purchase the farm for the plaintiff company but could not agree the terms with the owner. The owner promised that if he ever wanted to sell he would give the defendant the first option. The defendant later bought half of the farm for £60,000 through an agent. He thereafter sold it for £275000 to the Watervaal Trust Company which was a wholly owned subsidiary of the plaintiff company. He never disclosed his interest in the transaction and he did not disclose his profit from it. When the plaintiff discovered what had happened they sued to recover the profit of £215 000 from the defendant.

== Judgment ==
The court held that the company was entitled to claim from the director the profit made by him, and that such a claim was neither a condictio indebiti, nor an action for damages, nor an action upon a contract, and that under the Transvaal Act the term of prescription applicable thereto was thirty years.

The question of an amendment of pleadings, the court found, was one in the discretion of a trial court. The Appellate Division would not readily interfere with the exercise of such discretion.

The decision of the Transvaal Provincial Division, in Randfontein Estates Gold Mining Co., Ltd v Robinson, was thus varied.

== Significance ==
Where one man stands to another in a position of confidence involving a duty to protect the interests of that other, he is not permitted to make a secret profit at the other's expense or to place himself in a position where his interests conflict with his duty.

A principal who discovers that he has purchased his agent's own property may elect either to repudiate the contract or to confirm it. If he wishes it to stand, and also claims the resulting profit, he must show that such profit arises from transactions completely covered by the prohibitive operation of the relationship between him and the agent.

In any question as to the remedies available against a director of a company who has sold his own property to the company, regard must be had to the relationship in which the director stood to the company when he acquired the property. If he was under no obligation at that time to acquire the property for the company instead of for himself, his nondisclosure of the fact that the property was his own would entitle the company to repudiate the sale and restore the original position, but would not entitle it to retain the property at a price reduced by a reduction of the director's profit. When, however, the director's default extends further than non-disclosure, when a breach of duty attended the original acquisition, the company may, if it chooses, retain the property purchased and also demand a refund of the profits.

== See also ==
- Law of South Africa
- South African company law
