= Blesovsky v Shipper =

South African legal case

Blesovsky NO and Others v Shipper and Another is an important case in South African company law, particularly in the area of close corporations and the qualifications for membership. It was heard in the Witwatersrand Local Division by Budlender AJ on June 6, 2001, with judgment handed down June 12. S. Joseph SC appeared for the applicants and A. Kemack for the first respondent. There was no appearance for the second respondent.

In terms of section 29(1) of the Close Corporations Act, only natural persons are permitted to be members of a close corporation, subject to certain exceptions in section 29(2)(b) and (c). In terms of s 29(2)(c), "a natural or juristic person, nomine officii who, in the case of a member who is insolvent, deceased, mentally disordered or otherwise incapable or incompetent to manage his affairs, is a trustee of his insolvent estate or an administrator, executor or curator in respect of such member or is otherwise a person who is his duly appointed or authorised legal representative" qualifies for membership.

In the present case, in which a member of a close corporation was deceased, the executor of the deceased's estate qualified for membership of the corporation. The court found, however, on the plain meaning of the Act, that an executor may hold a member's interest in a close corporation only if the deceased held that member's interest at the time of his death: Only an executor of a deceased estate where the deceased was a member of the close corporation in question falls within the exception in s 29(2)(c).

== See also ==
- Law of South Africa
- South African company law
