= Western Bank Ltd v Pretorius =

South African legal case

Western Bank Ltd v Pretorius is an important case in South African law, particularly in the area of civil procedure.

== Facts ==
The plaintiff claimed provisional sentence against the defendant on a covering mortgage bond. In terms of the bond, the defendant held himself "bound unto (plaintiff) in the sum of R160 000 as a continuing security up to but not exceeding the principal sum in respect of [...] monies lent and advanced and/or to be lent and advanced."

At the time of the execution of the bond, no money had been lent to the defendant. Clause 18 of the bond provided that, should the defendant "fail to make payment of any monies payable" to the plaintiff, then "all capital and interest" would immediately be due and payable.

In terms of clause 21 of the bond, "a certificate signed by the [...], authorised officer [...] of the [plaintiff] specifying the amount owing by the [defendant] to the [plaintiff] and further stating that such amount is due, owing and payable [...] shall be sufficient proof of the amount of such indebtedness and of the fact that the sum is due, owing and payable for the purpose of obtaining provisional sentence."

The plaintiff filed a certificate in terms of clause 21, but the plaintiff's affidavits revealed that the amount certified as owing was excessive and incorrectly calculated.

Some eight months after a loan, secured by the bond, had been made to defendant, the plaintiff and the defendant agreed that the defendant's loan account with plaintiff should be converted into an overdraft facility. In terms of a letter signed by defendant, which governed the terms of repayment of the overdraft, the terms of payment under the bond were varied.

== Argument ==
The defendant contended:

- that the covering bond was not a liquid document;
- that no reliance could be placed on the certificate in terms of clause 21 of the bond; and, on the merits,
- that it had not been shown that payment of the defendant's indebtedness was actually due.

== Judgment ==
The court held that the covering mortgage bond was not a liquid document, as the acknowledgment of indebtedness therein was conditional upon future advances of sums of money. The contention that the certificate could not be relied upon because it reflected an excessive amount as owing was relevant to a defense on the merits, but not relevant to the issue of liquidity.

The bond sued on, while not a liquid document, had been rendered liquid by reason of the certificate, and was adequate to support an action for provisional sentence.

In spite of the above, the court found that plaintiff had failed to discharge the onus resting upon it to prove that the amount claimed was due and payable. Provisional sentence was therefore refused.

== Conclusion ==
Despite the above, the court found that plaintiff had failed to discharge the onus resting on it of proving that the amount claimed was due and payable. Provisional sentence was thus refused. An appeal took the form of Barclays Western Bank v Pretorius.
