= S v Friedman =

South African legal case

S v Friedman is an important case in South African law. It was heard in the Witwatersrand Local Division by Cloete J from 9 to 13 October 1995, with judgment handed down on 16 October. AO Cook and DN Unterhalter appeared for the accused, and ZH de Beer and H. Louw for the state. The case is especially significant for South African criminal law.

== Facts ==
Friedman, the accused, was charged in the Supreme Court with fraud involving the smuggling of stolen, unwrought gold. Millions of rands were involved, and the charges were of an intricate and complex nature. The accused contended, in the first instance, that the charge against him should be quashed, arguing that it did not comply with the provisions of section 84 of the Criminal Procedure Act, relating to the essentials of the charge. The accused furthermore contended that the common-law definition of fraud, as accepted by the courts, was unconstitutional insofar as the courts have held that the prejudice does not have to be financial or proprietary, may be potential, and does not have to be suffered by the represent.

The court dealt first with the contention that the charge should be quashed for want of compliance with the Act. After analysing the charge, the court pointed out certain aspects which lacked clarity. The prosecutor conceded that the charge lacked clarity in the respects pointed out by the court, and requested an opportunity suitably to amend the charge. Despite this, the accused persisted in his application for the indictment to be quashed.

== Judgment ==
In S v Nathaniel, the court did indeed quash an indictment without giving the State an opportunity to amend the charge or supplement the further particulars. The present court held, however, that, assuming such an approach was permissible, it should only be adopted where the indictment was so patently unsalvageable that no purpose would be served in giving the prosecutor an opportunity to cure the defects. The court held that, in casu, the charge was not unsalvageable and that the State should be given the opportunity to rectify the situation. The request for the quashing of the charge was dismissed.

After briefly dealing with the accused's second contention, the court turned to the question regarding the constitutional validity of the common-law crime of fraud. The accused argued that the crime, as presently formulated, would punish the individual without sufficient regard to the actual consequences of his or her actions. It was submitted

1. that actual prejudice, and not merely potential prejudice, should be proved;
2. that the prejudice ought to have been patrimonial; and
3. that the prejudice had to have been suffered by the represent, not by third parties.

From this, it was argued, would flow a constitutionally consistent definition of fraud. As presently formulated, the definition thus infringed upon the accused's right to freedom of the person and constituted an infringement of the substantive concept of a fair trial.

The court reaffirmed that radical and sweeping changes could not be embarked upon lightly. The radical approach suggested by counsel for the accused was found to be neither necessary nor desirable. The court held that, although wide, the present definition of fraud did not make it difficult, much less impossible, to ascertain the type of conduct which fell within it. Redress at civil law was confined to persons actually prejudiced, whereas it was not the primary function of the criminal law to satisfy wronged individuals, but rather to punish people who have transgressed defined norms. The court therefore held that the type of prejudice relied on by the State, and hitherto accepted by the courts, was not so far removed from the moral values of the man on the street that a reappraisal of the common-law definition of fraud was either warranted or necessary.

== See also ==
- Indictment
- Law of South Africa
- South African criminal law
