= Coutts v Jacobs =

South African legal case

Coutts v Jacobs is an important case in South African contract law, with especial resonance for trade usage in the area of implied terms.

== Facts ==
Coutts sent wool for sale to Jacobs, brokers of East London in the Eastern Cape, with the request that they should "do the best for me." Jacobs sold odd bales, but eventually Coutts caused the remainder of the wool to be removed from Jacobs and handed to other brokers for sale, paying a sum claimed by Jacobs as brokerage on the unsold portion subject to Coutts's right to recover same. Jacobs claimed the brokerage in virtue of a custom or trade usage, whereby, if wool is removed from one broker to another by the owner, the first broker is entitled to a charge on the transfer equal to the amount of commission which would be earned on the price offered or reserved. It was shown that the custom had been observed in East London and other ports for many years, but that recently one broker had not made the charge for eighteen months. It was not shown, however, that plaintiff knew of the custom.

== Judgment ==
The court held, on appeal, that the law of South Africa is not less favourable to a person relying upon a trade usage than the law of England, there being no difference between the two systems on this point. The custom or trade usage in question was found to be certain and reasonable. In the circumstances, in sending his wool to be disposed of by Jacobs, Coutts must be taken to have bound himself to have entrusted the wool to be dealt with by Jacobs in accordance with the usage of brokers in East London. The court held, furthermore, that the fact that one broker in East London had not observed the custom did not destroy the custom's validity.

== See also ==
- South African contract law
