= Administrator, Cape, v Ntshwaqela =

South African legal case

Administrator, Cape, and Another v Ntshwaqela and Others is an important case in South African law, heard in the Appellate Division on 7 November 1989, with judgment handed down on 30 November. Corbett CJ, Hoexter JA, Nestadt JA, Steyn JA and Nicholas AJA.

== Facts ==
The appellants, being the Administrator of the Cape and the Minister of Police, the respective heads of the Cape Provincial Administration and the South African Police (the CPA and the SAP respectively), appealed the grant against them of a mandament van spolie by a Provincial Division at the instance of the respondents. The respondents were among a group of squatters who had occupied land, part of which was owned by a local authority and part of which was privately owned, until, after several meetings between the owners, the CPA and the SAP, they and their possessions and dwellings were cleared from the site in an operation carried out by numerous members of the SAP, and removed to a township in transport provided by the CPA.

The order granted by the court a quo against the owners, the CPA and the SAP was to the effect that they were "directed to restore [the squatters] to undisturbed possession of the [...] sites" from which they had been cleared.

In the appeal, the CPA and the SAP argued, inter alia, that the mandament should not have been granted against them, in that

1. neither of them had participated in the demolition of any squatter dwellings, their respective roles being merely supportive; and
2. since neither of them had dominium or a right of control over the sites from which the squatters had been removed, they had no means, legal or otherwise, of giving effect to the mandament.

== Judgment ==
The court held, as to the first argument, on the facts, that, without the assistance of the CPA and the SAP, there could have been no removal of the squatters. The CPA and SAP had therefore been co-spoliators with the owners of the respective properties; as joint wrongdoers, they were liable.

As to the second argument, the court held that the order made by the court a quo, when applied to the facts, was solely prohibitory in content. Neither the owners nor the CPA and SAP had been required to do anything; there was therefore no room for an argument that the order had been impossible of performance.

The court decided, accordingly, that the mandament had correctly been granted against the appellants, and so confirmed the decision in Ntshwaqela v Chairman, Western Cape Regional Services Council.

== Principles ==
In legal usage, the court noted, the word "judgment" has at least two meanings: a general meaning and a technical meaning. When used in the general sense, the word comprises both the reasons for judgment and the judgment or order; when used in its technical sense, it is the equivalent of "order." When a judgment has been delivered in court, whether in writing or orally, the registrar draws up a formal order of court which is embodied in a separate document signed by him. It is a copy of this which is served by the sheriff. There can be an appeal only against the substantive order made by the court, not against the reasons for judgment.

The basic rules for interpreting the judgment or order of a court are no different from those applicable to the construction of documents. The court's intention has to be ascertained primarily from the language of the judgment or order as construed according to the usual well-known rules. The judgment or order, and the court's reasons for giving it, must be read as a whole in order to ascertain its intention. If, on such a reading, the meaning of the judgment or order is clear and unambiguous, no extrinsic fact or evidence is admissible to contradict, vary, qualify or supplement it. If any uncertainty in meaning does emerge, however, the extrinsic circumstances surrounding or leading up to the court's granting the judgment or order may be investigated and regarded in order to clarify it. The dicta in Firestone South Africa v Gentiruco was here applied.

The order with which a judgment concludes has a special function: it is the executive part of the judgment, which defines what the court requires to be done or not done, so that the defendant or respondent, or in some cases the world, may know it. While it may be said that the order must be read as part of the entire judgment, and not as a separate document, the court's directions must be found in the order and nowhere else. If the meaning of an order is clear and unambiguous, it is decisive, and cannot be restricted or extended by anything else stated in the judgment.

The rationale underlying the grant of a mandament van spolie is that no person is entitled to take the law into his own hands. An applicant for a spoliation order need not, therefore, as part of his case, prove that the spoliator had acquired possession of the property. Co-spoliators are, as a matter of principle, liable as joint wrongdoers.

It is trite that a court will not engage in the futile exercise of making an order which cannot be carried out. In the context of a mandament van spolie, impossibility is a question of fact and, where it is contended that an order should not be granted because it cannot be complied with, it must be shown that compliance is impossible on the facts. Where an order to restore possession of immovable property has been granted, there can be, in the nature of things, no physical handing over of the property. Such an order may be mandatory in part (for example, where it requires the spoliator to vacate the property), and it can be prohibitory, in that it requires the spoliator to forebear from preventing or hindering the spoliatus in resuming possession.

== See also ==
- Crime in South Africa
- Law of South Africa
- South African criminal law
