= S v Jackson =

South African legal case

- Court: Appellate Division
- Full case name: S v Jackson
- Decided: 18 March 1963
- Citation: 1963 (2) SA 626 (A)

Court membership
- Judges sitting: Steyn CJ, Wessels JA and Hoexter AJA

Case opinions
- Criminal law, Murder, Culpable homicide, Self-defence
- Decision by: Hoexter AJA

In S v Jackson, an important case in South African criminal law, the Appellate Division held that a person is justified in killing in self-defence not only when he fears that his life is in danger but also when he fears grievous bodily harm. PE Linde appeared for the appellant and BG van der Walt, SC, Attorney-General OFS, for the State. The case was heard on March 8, 1963. The appellant's attorney was DA Carroll, Johannesburg.

== Facts ==
In an appeal from a conviction of culpable homicide on a charge of murder, it appeared that the trial judge had repeatedly directed the jury that they could not acquit the appellant, on his plea of self-defence, unless they came to the conclusion that a reasonable man in his situation would have feared that his life was in danger.

== Judgment ==
The court held that the trial judge should have directed the jury that the appellant would have been justified in shooting the deceased if he justifiably feared that he was about to suffer grievous bodily harm at his hands. The failure so to direct the jury was an irregularity which had prejudiced the appellant, because it appeared that the jury might have found that, even though he did not fear for his life, he most certainly feared very serious bodily harm when he was assaulted by the deceased. The appeal was accordingly allowed and the conviction and sentence set aside.

== See also ==
- Crime
- Law of South Africa
- South African criminal law
