= S v Combrink =

South African legal case

S v Combrink is an important case in South African law, heard in the Supreme Court of Appeal by Brand JA, Ponnan JA and Shongwe JA on May 25, 2011, with judgment handed down on June 23. BC Bredenkamp SC appeared for the appellant, and JJ Kotze for the State. Its significance lies primarily in the area of punishment and sentencing.

== Facts ==
The appellant, a farmer, had fired two shots at an unidentified person walking across farmland, who had not responded to his calls. The second shot struck and killed that person. The farmer was convicted of murder by a single judge in the circuit court of the North Gauteng High Court and sentenced to fifteen years' imprisonment, five of which were suspended on the usual conditions. An appeal to the full bench of that court was dismissed in respect of the conviction but upheld in respect of sentence, the court substituting the trial court's sentence with one of ten years' imprisonment.

== Judgement ==
In an appeal to the Supreme Court of Appeal, it was held that, accepting the evidence of the witness, the appellant (who was a very good marksman) must subjectively have foreseen, when he aimed the second shot at the same place as the first, the possibility that the bullet could ricochet after striking a stone or some other object and in the process strike the deceased. Regardless of that foreseeable possibility, he went on to shoot. He was therefore guilty of murder, the intention being dolus eventualis.

The court held that, given the public incense with sentences which appeared to favour a particular group in society, courts had to be conscious and sensitive to cases which appeared to have racial or discriminatory connotations, especially when dealing with the question of sentence. Public interest was one of the essential considerations in determining an appropriate sentence. The public interest against discrimination was not necessarily in discrimination between black and white but rather between people in general, who perceive others, with prejudice, to be different or inferior to them. It was this perception that the judiciary should address. The effect of hate crimes went far beyond the victims and served to traumatise whole communities and damaged South African society. Without the decision makers in the criminal justice system being attuned to these issues, it would not be possible properly to combat hate crimes.

== See also ==
- Dolus eventualis
- Intention (criminal law)
- Mens rea
- Sentence (law)
- South African criminal law
- South African law
