= Tacit relocation =

Tacit relocation in Scots law is a principle whereby leases of land or buildings are renewed on the same conditions as previously existed if no notice of termination is given within the requisite period, subject to a minimum period of one year, applying in perpetuity until such notice is given. The concept is also known in the law of South Africa.
