= S v Van Zyl =

Important case in South African law

S v Van Zyl is an important case in South African law, heard in the Orange Free State Provincial Division by Steyn J and Malherbe J on 10 February 1986, with judgment handed down on 27 February. The court found that the crime of arson can be committed by a person who sets fire to his own immovable property with the intention of harming another in his property.

== See also ==
- Arson
- Crime in South Africa
- Law of South Africa
- South African criminal law
