= Cohen v Segal =

Cohen, NO v Segal is an important case in South African law. It was heard in the Witwatersrand Local Division by Boshoff J on March 17, 1970, with judgment handed down on April 28. The case is significant for its finding that a dividend cannot be declared which has the effect of diverting a portion of the corpus of the company to the shareholders. A dividend may therefore, generally speaking, only be declared out of profits, and a resolution which declares a dividend to be paid out of the capital of the company is ultra vires the company.

== Facts ==
Prior to the liquidation of a company, the defendant and one "H," the sole directors and shareholders, had sold the fixed property of the company. They had then divided the proceeds of the sale between them, the company's accountant having debited their loan accounts with the amounts. Thereafter they had purported to distribute the proceeds between them as a declared dividend. The liquidator of the company sued the defendant for the pecuniary loss which the company had sustained as a result of the delict.

== Judgment ==
The court held that, as the declaration of the dividend was ultra vires and of no force and effect, and as the money had been paid to the defendant as a loan, which loan still existed, the plaintiff had failed to make out a case for the payment of any money on the cause of action relied upon.

== See also ==
- Law of South Africa
- Management
- South African company law
- South African law of delict
