= R v Mavros =

South African legal case

R v Mavros is an important case in South African law. It was heard in the Appellate Division in Bloemfontein in November 1920. Innes CJ, Solomon JA and Juta JA were the presiding officers.

== Facts ==
The term "arson" in South African practice is used to denote the corresponding, but somewhat wider, crime of brandstichting, which is committed by a man who sets fire to his own house wrongfully, maliciously and with intent to injure or defraud another person. Mavros in the present case had been convicted of the crime of arson, in that he had wrongfully and maliciously set alight his own store with intent to burn it and defraud a certain insurance company of the money for which it had insured the store and its goods.

== Judgment ==
Departing from the decision in R v Enslin the court held, on a point of law reserved, that the facts as alleged constituted the crime charged.

== See also ==
- Arson
- Crime in South Africa
- Indictment
- Law of South Africa
- South African criminal law
