= Human rights in South Africa =

Human rights in South Africa are protected under the constitution. The 1998 Human Rights report by Myles Nadioo noted that the government generally respected the rights of citizens; however, there were concerns regarding the use of force by law enforcement, legal proceedings, and discrimination. The Human Rights Commission is mandated by the South African Constitution and the Human Rights Commission Act of 1994, to monitor, both pro-actively and by way of complaints brought before it, violations of human rights and seeking redress for such violations. It also has an educational role.

== Apartheid era ==
Apartheid was a system of segregation and discrimination implemented by a White minority against the Black majority. For example, Blacks were not allowed to buy land outside of land reserves despite being the indigenous population. Many of South Africa's anti-apartheid laws have been enacted while keeping in mind that what is seen by the international community, human rights organisations, and the Black majority in the country as the social and legal injustices associated with apartheid, and its anti-apartheid message has been hailed as an exemplary face of a Sub-Saharan nation.

== Education rights ==
The South African government has legislated for equal education throughout the country. This legislation includes the White Paper on Education and Training 1995 and the South African Schools Act, Act 84 of 1996. Nevertheless, there have been issues in the implementation of these laws, and according to a 2020 report by Amnesty International, South Africa has one of the most unequal educational systems in the world, with the widest gap between the test scores of the top 20% of schools and the remaining 80%. The South African government tends to focus primarily on the quality of higher education. Additionally, there is not much racial integration in state schools. Though laws allow for integration, many schools remain predominantly one race. Encouragingly, the number of students completing Grade 12 has significantly increased in recent years, going from 3.7 million South Africans aged 15 and over in 1996 to 11.6 million in 2016.

=== Rural schools ===
Most of the Education in South Africa is provided by rural schools. In fact, approximately 79% of Black South Africans live in rural communities. However, the government has neglected the quality of education in these rural areas. Issues with rural schooling include: poor facilities, lack of clean water, lack of resources, and unmotivated teachers. Considering poor facilities, some schools are not structurally stable and are at risk of collapse, with some schools even lacking electricity. Most schools with more than 500 children lack proper sanitation for toilets, while some schools don't have toilets at all. Furthermore, many rural schools are in remote areas without direct access to clean water. Water is generally kilometers away and unclean because animals bathe and drink in it. This lack of water is a particular issue in the daytime when the temperature is highest. The remoteness of these rural schools is also a specific problem because they are quite distant from pupils' homes. And, many schools do not remedy this issue with transport. Additionally, many schools lack the needed books and supplies for learning. In June 2010, the Government Gazette recognised that these unfavorable learning environments increase rates of absenteeism of teachers and dropout rates of students. Some students do not have enough food to eat and are hungry during school. This hunger causes a lack on concentration and makes learning environments less favorable.

=== Rights for disabled children ===
Though South Africa ratified the Convention on the Rights of Persons with Disabilities in 2007, children with disabilities still do not have equal access to education. In many situations, a state school can determine which students can enroll, and the school may reject a disabled child without any consequences. In cases where the student can enroll in a public school, a school may lack the resources necessary to teach children with disabilities effectively. Additionally, children with disabilities in state schools are forced to pay fees—such as for an assistant—that other students are not required to pay. South Africa has schools that cater for students with disabilities, but these schools are limited in number and require fees to be paid. The limited number of schools forces children to either board or use costly transport. In 2000, the UN Committee on the Rights of the Child was specifically concerned with the lack of implementation of South Africa's agreement to guarantee free primary education. South Africa still struggles to provide free primary education for all. Additionally, many disabled students are not able to access quality education because they are on waiting lists for schools that cater to students with special needs. For example, in 2015, there were approximately 5,552 children with disabilities on waiting lists.

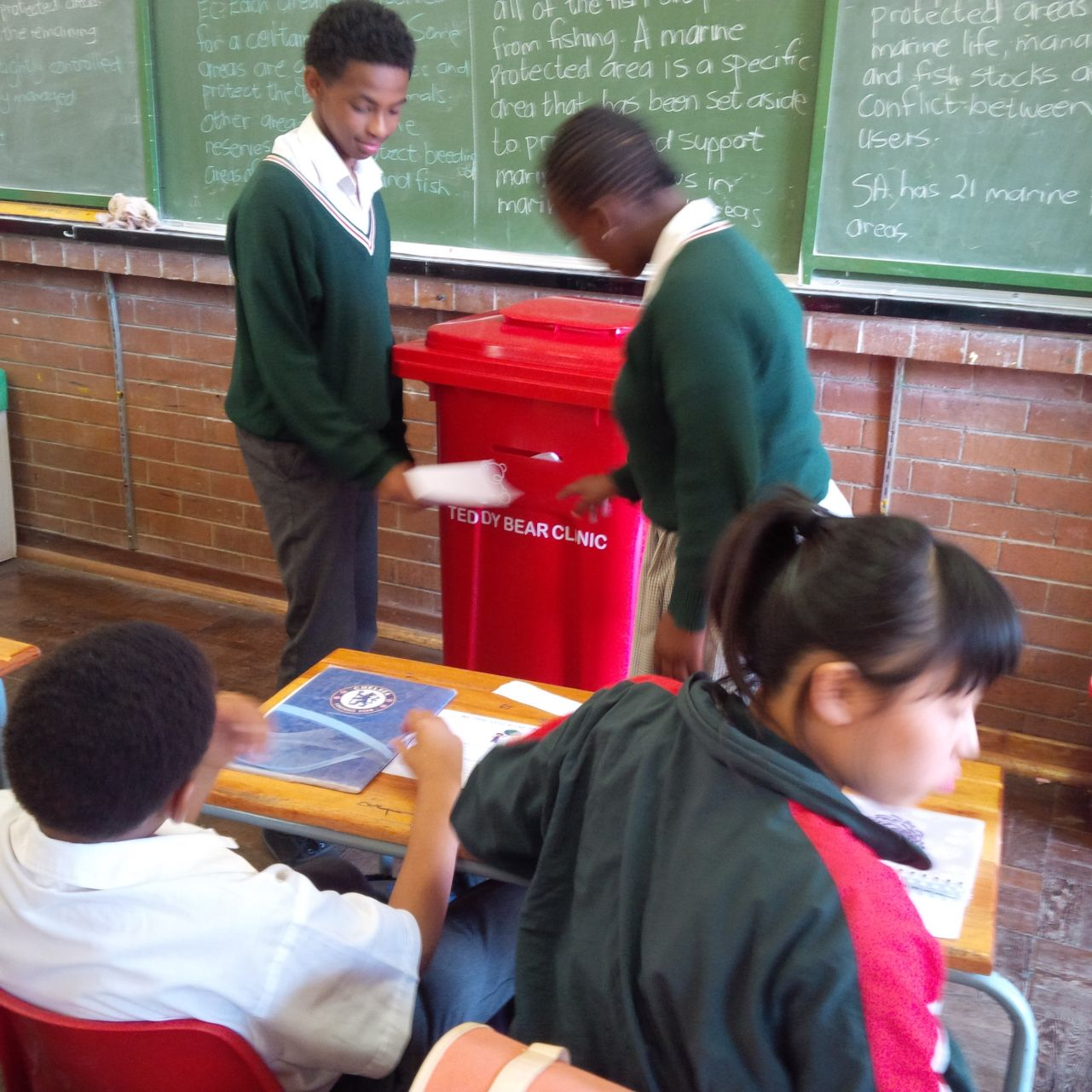
Primary School in South Africa

== Press freedom ==
Press freedom has a chequered history in South Africa. While some sectors of the South African media openly criticised the apartheid system and the 1948-1994 National Party government, they were hampered by government censorship during those years. For example, South African investigative journalist Donald Woods became renowned after he fled to live in the United Kingdom in exile after helping to expose the truth behind the death of Steve Biko, the leader of the Black Consciousness Movement, along with fellow journalist and current South African politician, Helen Zille. After the end of apartheid and National Party rule in 1994 however, censorship ended and a new constitution was enacted which has a Bill of Rights that guarantees that every citizen has the right to freedom of expression, which includes freedom of the press and media, the freedom to receive or impart information or ideas, freedom of artistic creativity, academic freedom, and freedom of scientific research.

These freedoms are generally respected in practice, and the press is considered relatively free. Laws governing the media and political control over its content are typically regarded as moderate, and there is little evidence of repressive measures against journalists. In consequence, South Africa is ranked 39th in Reporters Without Borders' worldwide index of press freedom 2015–2016.

However, there has also been criticism of certain aspects of the freedom of the press in South Africa. All the prominent daily newspapers are owned by the four largest media firms, which could lead to pro-corporate bias. In addition, the South African Broadcasting Corporation (SABC), the public broadcaster, is funded by the government.

Some media aspects of the Oilgate scandal have also been a cause for concern as was the banning of the publication of the cartoons of Muhammad in South Africa by Judge Mohammed Jajbhay on 3 February 2006.

According to media reports, the SABC blacklisted certain commentators and analysts who may be critical of the government.

Recently, the Protection of Information Bill and the proposed Media Appeals Tribunal has caused controversy both domestically and abroad with allegations that press freedom is under threat.

== Political rights ==
South Africa has a liberal constitution that protects all fundamental political freedoms. However, there have been a number of incidents of political repression as well as threats of future repression in violation of this constitution leading some analysts and civil society organisations to conclude that there is or could be a new climate of political repression or a decline in political tolerance.

Political patronage is a significant aspect in South African politics. However, this patronage infringes on the rights of the people, especially those in poverty. 40% of South Africans are dependent on the state to supply necessities. This dependence on the state lessens the autonomy of South Africans in need of this assistance. These necessities are supplied in the form of grants, which require governmental documents to obtain. Consequently, bureaucracy plays a major role in an individual's ability to obtain a grant and thus obtain necessities. Politicians gain substituents based on material promises. If the politicians fulfill these promises, often the recipients are only those who supported the politicians. Essentially, voters' dependence on the state precludes their ability to vote based on ideological platforms. This phenomenon does not align with the democratic principles of South Africa.

== Welfare ==
As of 2021, roughly 30% of South Africans (18 million out of the country's population of 60 million) received government grants. This number increased sharply during the coronavirus pandemic; in October 2020, more than 70% of South Africans were living in a household receiving government support.

The 1997 "White Paper on Social Welfare" outlines South Africa's social welfare policy. The White Paper on Social Welfare focuses on providing South Africans with opportunities for increased autonomy. For example, White Paper on Social Welfare stipulates the provision of public works projects. The White Paper also emphasises the significance of non-state welfare organisations in providing welfare. Such organisations include non-governmental organisations (NGO's) and religious organisations. Additionally, the White Paper focuses on the government providing welfare specifically to families. But, the White Paper has relatively fewer provisions for older adults. The government expects families to take responsibility for caring for their elderly relatives, partly because of cultural values. The White Paper also covered child support grants and refrained from stereotyping concerning the gender roles in a family. For instance, the White Paper did not specifically refer to the male in a household as the "breadwinner". Racial disparities in the cities of South Africa still exist, despite the country's having long since ended apartheid. Many black South Africans still struggle to obtain basic needs such as housing, living in under-maintained townships. In contrast, many urban white South Africans reside in gated communities with a heavy presence of private security. The Sowetan Live has recently reported that "...indeed the city has contributed to" building "4,000 social homes in 11 districts" with more than 350,000 residents still in need of immediate housing relief.

== Health ==
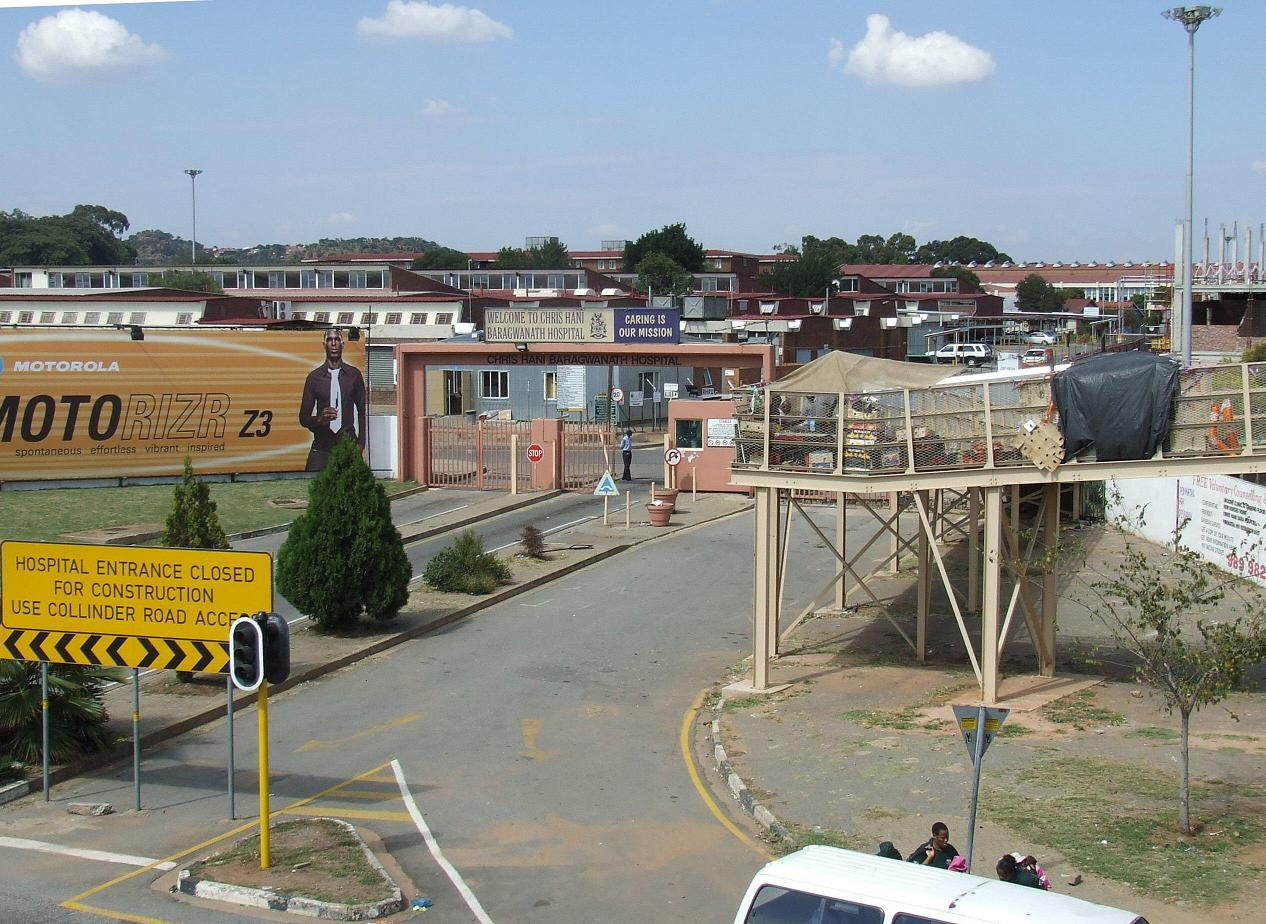
The Chris Hani Baragwanath Hospital, Soweto

South Africa has a plethora of infectious disease cases. Malaria is significant cause of death because of a lack of resources to treat patients. Additionally, the water is dirty with human and industrial waste which contributes to the spread of disease. Many deaths are caused by poverty rather than a lack of cures for a disease. Poverty is a significant reason for death because low-income families are not able to afford proper health services, and hospitals are not able to buy enough supplies. Additionally, people living in South Africa who are illegal immigrants lack resources for health care that is non-emergency. For example, many of the people living in the Hillbrow Health Precinct are not legal and have poor health resources. Specifically, some hospital buildings were built before World War II. Furthermore, the Hillbrow community has high rates of Sexually Transmitted Diseases.

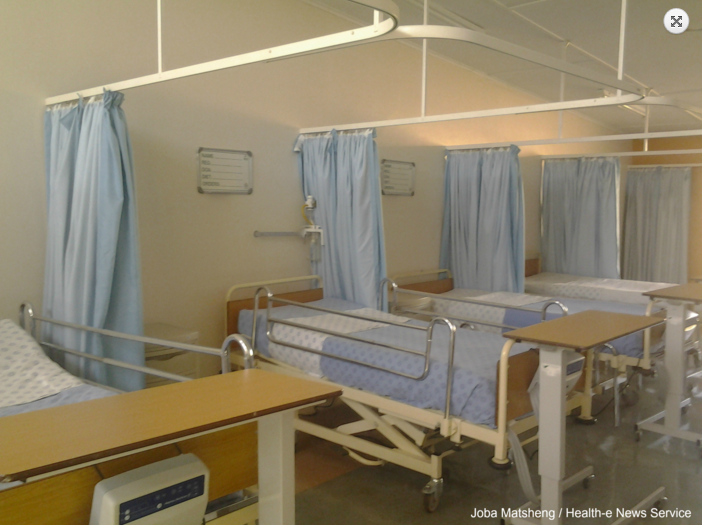
East Rand Hospital. There are not enough beds for the patients.

=== HIV/AIDS ===
South Africa has the largest number of people living with HIV/AIDS in the world, 7.5 million as of 2021. It was first detected in 1982. The disease was first detected in homosexuals, but it rapidly spread to heterosexuals. Because of the rapid spread, the government tried to step in and help. However, South Africa was in the last years of apartheid when HIV/AIDS was becoming an epidemic. Thus, the South African government had great difficulty mitigating the effect of the epidemic. For instance, because of the desegregation of schools and the controversy surrounding that, the government did not focus on providing quality sex education that specifically focused on HIV/AIDS. Additionally, the local and federal governments had disagreements about the allocation of funds for HIV/AIDS prevention, thus causing inefficiency and gridlock. Also, some of the money allocated to HIV/AIDS prevention was misused. For example, a musical called Sarafina II was projected to increase awareness about AIDS and AIDS prevention. However, the play was not clear and did not significantly help with sex education. Much of the HIV/AIDS treatment and progress has been funded by non-profit organizations such as WHO and UNAIDS.

==== Possible causes ====
There are multiple theories about the causes of the HIV/AIDS epidemic in South Africa. Some theorise that migrant workers were a source of the proliferation of the disease. The migrant workers usually would not see their wives and families for months, so they had extramarital sexual intercourse in the cities. Then, later during the holidays, husbands would return home and unknowingly infect their wives with the disease. Another theory is that the culture makes South Africa more vulnerable to the epidemic. For example, male circumcision at birth reduces the risk of the child getting HIV/AIDS. However, many South Africans do not do this procedure because it is not traditional to do circumcision at birth.

Additionally, inadequate access to quality healthcare can exacerbate the epidemic. There is quite a disparity between public and private healthcare. Overall, public hospitals provide worse care than private hospitals do. Public hospitals are generally overcrowded and understaffed. In fact, 82% of South Africans are cared for by 27% of South Africa's general physicians. The difference in these percentages is caused by general physicians moving to the private healthcare sector and by brain drain. Brain drain is when professionals emigrate from their home country to work elsewhere. Also, the disparity is caused by the fact that private hospitals have more resources and funds than public hospitals do because of the higher fees at private hospitals.

== Deportation of foreigners ==
The South African government has been criticised by Human Rights Watch for deporting hundreds of thousands of Zimbabwean refugees and treating victims of political violence as economic migrants. By sending refugees back to persecution, Human Rights Watch has asserted that South Africa is violating the refugee convention and international law.

On 17 September 2020, Human Rights Watch published a 64-page report detailing the widespread xenophobic violence in South Africa. The report also contained video footage and witness testimony. Despite the March 2019 adoption of a government action plan to combat xenophobia, African and Asian foreigners in the country suffer routine harassment and abuse.

== Sexual and LGBT rights ==
=== Sexism ===
South Africa has faced issues regarding gender inequality in court cases. A prominent example is that of Jacob Zuma's Rape Trial in 2006. "Khwezi, a female AIDS activist, brought Zuma to court for raping her. As his defense, Zuma claimed that he could "have liaisons with women" quite easily, so he asserted that he would not have raped Khwezi. Zuma also used Zulu culture as support for his defense. Some of Zuma's supporters gathered outside of the courthouse and burned photographs of Khewzi and yelled phrases like "Burn the Bitch. " These actions caused gender activists to protest against sexism and to raise concern about the fact that the judge allowed the court to admit evidence about Khwezi's sexual history, but did not admit evidence from Zuma's sexual history. Many people felt that Zuma went against the modern South African liberal democracy because he represented patriarchy at a relative extreme.

=== Rape ===
In 2018/19, South African police recorded 41,583 rapes, though experts have warned that it is difficult to assess how many more cases have not been reported. A 2009 survey found one in four South African men admitted to raping someone and another survey found one in three women out of 4000 surveyed women said they had been raped in the past year.

Rapes are also perpetrated by children (some as young as ten). Child and baby rape incidences are some of the highest in the world. Many high-profile baby rapes that included extensive reconstructive surgery to rebuild urinary, genital, abdominal, or tracheal systems have appeared.

=== Same-sex marriage ===
The Civil Union Act 17 of 2006 legalized same-sex marriage in South Africa. It was a direct response to the Minister of Home Affairs v Fourie case, where the Constitutional Court declared the lack of legal recognition of same-sex relationships unconstitutional and gave Parliament a year to remedy the situation.

South Africa's post-apartheid constitution was the first in the world to outlaw discrimination based on sexual orientation. South Africa was the first country in Africa, and the fifth in the world, to legalise same-sex marriage.

=== Intersex rights ===
Intersex people in South Africa have some of the same rights as other people, but with significant gaps in protection from non-consensual cosmetic medical interventions and protection from discrimination. The country was the first to explicitly include intersex people in anti-discrimination law.

== Labour rights ==
=== Legal ===
South Africa has implicit and explicit labour regulations. Its implicit labour regulations are stated in the Constitution and set the boundaries for explicit regulations. Explicit regulations are set by employers and are specific to each job. On the other hand, implicit regulations are the Labour Relations Act 66 of 1995, the Basic Conditions of Employment Act 75 of 1997, the New Employment Equity Act 55 of 1998, and the Skills Development Act 97 of 1998—each with subsequent amendments. The Labour Relations Act 66 allows workers to create unions and collectively bargain. Over the years, the number of unions in South Africa have declined. Also, there are fewer federation-associated trade unions and more independent trade unions in South Africa today. The Basic Conditions of Employment Act 75 has regulations concerning working hours, leave, and termination. The New Employment Equity Act 55 was created to lessen discrimination. It also provides parameters for affirmative action. The Skills Development Act 97 promotes worker productivity and competitiveness in the market.

=== Unions ===
South Africa has some labour-related issues. One aspect is the formation of unions. In fact, 22% of South African workers are union members. In 2012, the Marikana Massacre occurred. The Marikana Massacre was the killing of 44 platinum miners who were on strike to earn increased wages. 78 people were wounded and 259 were arrested. One reason for this brutality was that the strike was not protected. Additionally, poorly paid farm workers have been striking. One example is the Western Cape Farm worker strike, in which the workers were mostly female. The strike resulted in 3 deaths, but the workers got a 52% increase in pay. This strike was also unprotected. There was another platinum mining strike in 2014, but it differed from the 2012 platinum mining strike because it was protected. The protection prevented police brutality. In fact, this strike lasted for five months. Consequently, the world's platinum production decreased by 40% because of the lack of labour. The worker's wages did increase as a result, but the workers also suffered losses because of the "no work, no pay" policy in South Africa. Workers who strike are generally strongly motivated, even with protected strikes, because there is much risk of loss.

=== Foreign ===
The union membership rate in South Africa is one of the highest in the world. Furthermore, the risk of union conflict is a deterrent for foreign companies. South Africa is receptive to foreign companies because they create jobs. The unemployment rate in South Africa is approximately 30%. The government encourages foreign and disadvantaged domestic company partnerships by giving benefits to foreign companies. Also, the South African government requires that businesses with government contracts donate to social programs. Also, South Africa has a high number of migrant workers from rural areas throughout Africa, which gives foreign companies a large labour force to choose from.

== Historical situation ==
The following chart shows South Africa's ratings in the Freedom in the World reports, published annually by Freedom House, since 1972. A rating of 1 is "free"; 7, "not free".^{1}

Historical ratings

Year	Political Rights	Civil Liberties	Status	Head of Government^{2}
1972	5	6	Not Free	Balthazar Johannes Vorster
1973	4	5	Partly Free	Balthazar Johannes Vorster
1974	4	5	Partly Free	Balthazar Johannes Vorster
1975	4	5	Partly Free	Balthazar Johannes Vorster
1976	4	5	Partly Free	Balthazar Johannes Vorster
1977	5	6	Not Free	Balthazar Johannes Vorster
1978	5	6	Not Free	Balthazar Johannes Vorster
1979	5	6	Not Free	Pieter Willem Botha
1980	5	6	Not Free	Pieter Willem Botha
1981	5	6	Not Free	Pieter Willem Botha
1982^{3}	5	6	Not Free	Pieter Willem Botha
1983	5	6	Not Free	Pieter Willem Botha
1984	5	6	Not Free	Pieter Willem Botha
1985	5	6	Not Free	Pieter Willem Botha
1986	5	6	Not Free	Pieter Willem Botha
1987	5	6	Not Free	Pieter Willem Botha
1988	5	6	Not Free	Pieter Willem Botha
1989	6	5	Not Free	Pieter Willem Botha
1990	5	4	Partly Free	Frederik Willem de Klerk
1991	5	4	Partly Free	Frederik Willem de Klerk
1992	5	4	Partly Free	Frederik Willem de Klerk
1993	5	4	Partly Free	Frederik Willem de Klerk
1994	2	3	Free	Frederik Willem de Klerk
1995	1	2	Free	Nelson Mandela
1996	1	2	Free	Nelson Mandela
1997	1	2	Free	Nelson Mandela
1998	1	2	Free	Nelson Mandela
1999	1	2	Free	Nelson Mandela
2000	1	2	Free	Thabo Mvuyelwa Mbeki
2001	1	2	Free	Thabo Mvuyelwa Mbeki
2002	1	2	Free	Thabo Mvuyelwa Mbeki
2003	1	2	Free	Thabo Mvuyelwa Mbeki
2004	1	2	Free	Thabo Mvuyelwa Mbeki
2005	1	2	Free	Thabo Mvuyelwa Mbeki
2006	2	2	Free	Thabo Mvuyelwa Mbeki
2007	2	2	Free	Thabo Mvuyelwa Mbeki
2008	2	2	Free	Thabo Mvuyelwa Mbeki
2009	2	2	Free	Kgalema Petrus Motlanthe
2010	2	2	Free	Jacob Gedleyihlekisa Zuma
2011	2	2	Free	Jacob Gedleyihlekisa Zuma
2012	2	2	Free	Jacob Gedleyihlekisa Zuma
2013	2	2	Free	Jacob Gedleyihlekisa Zuma
2014	2	2	Free	Jacob Gedleyihlekisa Zuma
2015	2	2	Free	Jacob Gedleyihlekisa Zuma
2016	2	2	Free	Jacob Gedleyihlekisa Zuma
2017	2	2	Free	Jacob Gedleyihlekisa Zuma
2018	2	2	Free	Jacob Gedleyihlekisa Zuma
2019	2	2	Free	Cyril Ramaphosa
2020	2	2	Free	Cyril Ramaphosa
2021	2	2	Free	Cyril Ramaphosa
2022	2	2	Free	Cyril Ramaphosa
2023	2	2	Free	Cyril Ramaphosa

== International treaties ==
South Africa's stances on international human rights treaties are as follows:

Treaty	Organisation	Introduced	Signed	Ratified
Convention on the Prevention and Punishment of the Crime of Genocide	United Nations	1948	-	1998
International Convention on the Elimination of All Forms of Racial Discrimination	United Nations	1966	-	1998
International Covenant on Economic, Social and Cultural Rights	United Nations	1966	1994	-
International Covenant on Civil and Political Rights	United Nations	1966	1994	1998
First Optional Protocol to the International Covenant on Civil and Political Rights	United Nations	1966	-	2002
Convention on the Non-Applicability of Statutory Limitations to War Crimes and Crimes Against Humanity	United Nations	1968	-	-
International Convention on the Suppression and Punishment of the Crime of Apartheid	United Nations	1973	-	-
Convention on the Elimination of All Forms of Discrimination against Women	United Nations	1979	1993	1995
Convention against Torture and Other Cruel, Inhuman or Degrading Treatment or Punishment	United Nations	1984	1993	1998
Convention on the Rights of the Child	United Nations	1989	1993	1995
Second Optional Protocol to the International Covenant on Civil and Political Rights, aiming at the abolition of the death penalty	United Nations	1989	-	2002
International Convention on the Protection of the Rights of All Migrant Workers and Members of Their Families	United Nations	1990	-	-
Optional Protocol to the Convention on the Elimination of All Forms of Discrimination against Women	United Nations	1999	-	2005
Optional Protocol to the Convention on the Rights of the Child on the Involvement of Children in Armed Conflict	United Nations	2000	2002	2009
Optional Protocol to the Convention on the Rights of the Child on the Sale of Children, Child Prostitution and Child Pornography	United Nations	2000	-	2003
Convention on the Rights of Persons with Disabilities	United Nations	2006	2007	2007
Optional Protocol to the Convention on the Rights of Persons with Disabilities	United Nations	2006	2007	2007
International Convention for the Protection of All Persons from Enforced Disappearance	United Nations	2006	-	-
Optional Protocol to the International Covenant on Economic, Social and Cultural Rights	United Nations	2008	-	-
Optional Protocol to the Convention on the Rights of the Child on a Communications Procedure	United Nations	2011	-	-

== See also ==
- Human trafficking in South Africa
- In re Dube (1979)
- Prizm Project

== Notes ==
1.Note that the "Year" signifies the "Year covered". Therefore, the information for the year 2008 is from the 2009 report, and so on.
2.As of 1 January. Until 1994, the Head of Government was the Prime Minister. From 1984 to 1994, it was the State President, and since then, it has been the President.
3.The 1982 report covers the year 1981, and the first half of 1982, and the following 1984 report covers the second half of 1982 and the whole of 1983. For simplicity, the two aberrant "year and a half" reports have been split into three-year reports by extrapolation.
