= Stellenbosch Farmers' Winery v Distillers Corporation =

South African legal case

Stellenbosch Farmers' Winery Ltd v Distillers Corporation (SA) Ltd and Another is an important case in South African law. It was heard in the Appellate Division on 18 September 1961, with judgment handed down on 23 November. Hoexter ACJ, Beyers JA, Van Blerk JA, Rumpff JA and Wessels AJA presided. It is significant for its articulation of the contrast between a mere pecuniary interest on the one hand and an actual legal right on the other:

The fact that the shareholder is entitled to an aliquot share in the distribution of the surplus assets when the company is wound up proves that he is financially interested in the success or failure of the company but not that he has any right or title to any assets of the company.

The court found that, in enacting section 166(v) of the Liquor Act, as amended by section 42 of the Liquor Further Amendment Act, the legislature had not intended to use the phrase "financial interest in a business" in any restricted sense, such as, for example, in reference to a proprietary interest or a controlling interest. A "financial interest," within the meaning of section 166(v), is acquired, in any business conducted by a company, by a person who acquires shares in that company or in any other company which is by shareholding on its part linked with the former company, either directly or through an intermediate shareholding company or companies.

Goldberg v PJ Joubert was thus overruled and the decision in the Cape Provincial Division, in Distillers Corporation v Stellenbosch Farmers' Winery, thus confirmed.

== See also ==
- Law of South Africa
- South African company law
