= Barclays Western Bank v Pretorius =

South African legal case

Barclays Western Bank Ltd v Pretorius is an important case in South African law, particularly in the area of civil procedure; it was an appeal of Western Bank Ltd v Pretorius.

== Facts ==
Provisional sentence had been claimed on two surety bonds. The feature of the litigation which brought it before the court was that neither bond contained an acknowledgment by the defendant that she was indebted to the plaintiff in a specific amount; nor did either bond contain an unequivocal promise by her to pay the plaintiff a definite sum.

== Issue ==
The question confronting the court was whether such a bond could support a claim for provisional sentence.

== Law ==
The leading case in this area of the law was Union Share Agency Investment Ltd v Spain. "It is the essence of the doctrine of provisional sentence," the court held in that case, "that the acknowledgement of debt or the undertaking to pay should be clear and certain on the face of the document itself, and that no extrinsic evidence should be required to establish the indebtedness."

In the case of Bee-Jay Ltd v Knights-Trench, the court found that it was "fundamental that a document, to support a claim for provisional sentence, must be clear and certain as to the indebtedness [.... T]he indebtedness cannot be clear and certain if the amount thereof is uncertain."

According to the court in Lagerwey v Rich and Others,

One starts with the proposition that provisional sentence, being an extraordinary remedy whereunder the plaintiff enjoys special and important advantages, is granted only in a case which falls strictly within a particular class. It is granted only when the plaintiff has a claim for the payment of money supported by strong prima facie proof in the form of a liquid document which the defendant has signed, or to which he is deemed to have given his assent. A document is liquid, in the context of an action for provisional sentence, only if it reflects unequivocally a present indebtedness by the defendant in a specific sum of money.

== Judgment ==
After considering these authorities, the court held that provisional sentence could not be granted on a surety bond which, while limiting the surety's liability to a prescribed maximum, covered a principal indebtedness in an indefinite amount, without even acknowledging that any at all existed. No subsequent certificate, as provided for in the bond, indicating the amount of the indebtedness, could cure the intrinsic illiquidity of such a document.

Didcott J thus took a stand against the expansion of the provisional-sentence procedure, focusing on its disadvantages and oppressive byproducts. The procedure is recognised, however, as a commercial necessity, since most of the time defendants do not actually have a defence.
