= Law of conveyancing in South Africa =

South African process for the transfer of title in land

The law of conveyancing in South Africa refers the legal process whereby a person, company, close corporation or trust becomes the registered and legal owner of immovable property, including improved and unimproved land, houses, farms, flats and sectional titles, as well as the registration of bonds and other rights to fixed properties, including servitudes, usufructs and the like. It entails the transfer process from the date the deed of sale is signed to the date of payment of finances and delivery of the deeds. It also covers the process of the registration of mortgages. Conveyancing in South Africa may only be carried out by a licensed conveyancer: an attorney who has passed the National Conveyancing Examination.

== See also ==
- South African property law
