= In re Dube =

South African legal case

In re Dube is a famous case in South African law, heard and decided by Milne J and Didcott J in the Natal Provincial Division on May 1, 1979. It was a review of a decision by a commissioner of the Department of Plural Relations and Development, and is celebrated for its creativity in pursuit of justice.

== Facts ==
Subject to the Black Urban Areas Consolidation Act, unemployed black men could be declared "idle persons" in certain circumstances and with certain exceptions. The general rule was that, although capable of being employed, such persons must have had no lawful employment "for a total of 122 days or more during the past year." The court detailed the application of the rule as follows:

An official who has reason to believe that you belong to the class of "idle persons" may arrest you at any time and in any place outside a special "Bantu" area. You are then brought before a commissioner of the Department of Plural Relations and Development. He calls on you to give a "good and satisfactory account" of yourself, whatever that may be. Unless you do manage to do so, he formally declares you to be an "idle person". Nobody is required to prove that you match the definition. You must prove you do not.

A commissioner had so declared one Jabulani Sydney Dube, twenty-four years old and living on welfare in Lamontville with his mother. The commissioner had ordered his removal to and detention in a farm colony, unless he found employment within thirty days or left Durban of his own accord within 35.

== Findings ==
The Act was clearly, in the estimation of the court, an unjust one. Wrote Didcott (Milne concurring),

Once you are officially "idle", all sorts of things can be done to you. Your removal to a host of places, and your detention in a variety of institutions, can be ordered. You can be banned forever from returning to the area where you were found, or from going anywhere else for that matter, although you may have lived there all your life. Whatever right to remain outside a special 'Bantu' area you gained by birth, lawful residence or erstwhile employment is automatically lost.

Perhaps you have never broken the law in your life, or harmed anyone, or made a nuisance of yourself by your activities or the lack of them [...]. It makes no difference.

When the commissioner has finished with you, the papers in your case go on review to a Judge of the Supreme Court. He is expected, if everything is in order, to certify that what happened to you appears to him to have been "in accordance with justice".

The trouble is that it was not. It may have been in accordance with the legislation and, because what appears in legislation is the law, in accordance with that too. But it can hardly be said to have been "in accordance with justice".

South Africa under apartheid was subject to parliamentary sovereignty, such that unfair and arbitrary legislation could not be struck down by the courts. In Didcott's classic formulation, "Parliament has the power to pass the statutes it likes, and there is nothing the Courts can do about that. The result is law. But that is not always the same as justice. The only way that Parliament can ever make legislation just is by making just legislation."

In re Dube is a notable example of the methods employed by the courts to manoeuvre around this obstacle. Didcott noted that Dube was epileptic, suffering frequent paroxysms and in need of constant medication from King Edward VIII Hospital; fit only for light duties and thus incapable of being employed. For this reason, he fell outside the ambit of the relevant provision of the Act. The court ruled that the relevant provisions of the Act did not extend to persons who were incapable of being employed: "The proceedings were therefore contrary not only to justice, but to the Act as well, with the result that, on this occasion at least, it is possible to apply the Act and to do justice simultaneously." The declaration and consequent order by the commissioner accordingly were thus set aside on review.
