= Holmdene Brickworks v Roberts Construction =

South African legal case

Holmdene Brickworks (Pty) Ltd v Roberts Construction Co Ltd, decided by Corbett CJ, is an important case in South African contract law, specifically in the area of breach.

== Facts ==
The respondent, a building and engineering company in need of bricks for certain walls of a building it was constructing, entered into a supply contract with the appellant. Shortly after construction was completed, Holmdene's bricks "were beginning to crumble and decompose," manifesting a condition known as "efflorescence," which threatened the stability of the entire edifice. The affected walls were perforce demolished, and Roberts sued for consequential damages arising from the breach of the contract.

On July 2, 1975, in the Transvaal Provincial Division, judgment was granted in Roberts's favour. No interest had been claimed, and naturally none was awarded. When Holmdene appealed, however, Roberts applied, by way of amendment, for

1. interest at six per cent from the date of judgment by the court a quo; and
2. interest at eleven per cent from date of judgment in the Appeal Court in terms of the Prescribed Rate of Interest Act.

Only the first of these was opposed.

== Issues ==
Among the questions, then, was whether or not Holmdene was liable for consequential damages; whether or not efflorescence constitutes a latent defect and how to determine this; and whether liability for the damages was founded on breach or on delict.

== Judgment ==
The court defined a latent defect as follows:

broadly speaking [...] an abnormal quality or attribute which destroys or substantially impairs the utility or effectiveness of the res vendita for the purpose for which it was sold or for which it is commonly used [....] Such a defect is latent when it is one which is not visible or discoverable upon an inspection of the res vendita."

The court held on the evidence that Holmdene's bricks did indeed contain a latent defect, and that the demolition of the walls was a natural and foreseeable consequence of this breach. Roberts had acted therefore reasonably in carrying out the demolition. The decision of the court a quo was therefore confirmed.

The court held, further, that to allow the applications for the payment of interest would be effectively to vary the order of the court to the detriment of the appellant. In the absence of a cross-appeal, the court could not do this. Furthermore, because the Act had come into operation on July 16, 1976,—that is, after the judgment in the court a quo—the relevant provision was inapplicable. The application, accordingly, was refused.

The question of what constitutes a latent defect went unresolved, as did the matter of whether liability for consequential damages has its foundations on breach or on delict.

== Special damages ==
One of the judgment's most important contributions to the law of contract in South Africa is its classic statement on special damages:

To ensure that undue hardship is not imposed on the defaulting party [...] the defaulting party's liability is limited in terms of broad principles of causation and remoteness, to (a) those damages that flow naturally and generally from the kind of breach of contract in question and which the law presumes the parties contemplated as a probable result of the breach, and (b) those damages that, although caused by the breach of contract, are ordinarily regarded in law as being too remote to be recoverable unless, in the special circumstances attending the conclusion of the contract, the parties actually or presumptively contemplated that they would probably result from its breach.
