= South African company law =

Regulates corporations formed under the Companies Act

South African company law is that body of rules which regulates corporations formed under the Companies Act. A company is a business organisation which earns income by the production or sale of goods or services. This entry also covers rules by which partnerships and trusts are governed in South Africa, together with (albeit in less detail) cooperatives and sole proprietorships.

== Features ==
A company has (but is not limited to) three distinguishing features:

1. its legal separateness from the people involved in it—specifically from its owners, called shareholders,
2. its potential immortality, and
3. its size.

=== Separateness ===
A company is separate from its employees, shareholders or members (in the case of close corporations), in that the connection between them is, usually, a mere contract of employment, which may be terminated, leaving both parties to go their own ways. The same generally applies, however, to those businesses which are not companies. There is also, more importantly, usually a separation between the company and its owners.

The locus classicus for the principle that a company is a separate entity from its directors and shareholders is the landmark English case of Salomon v Salomon. Shareholders are the owners of one or more units of equal value into which the company is divided and which are usually sold in order to raise capital, either for the company itself or for its founders. A share carries with it a defined set of rights and duties: most notably the right to receive a share of the company's profits and the right to receive a share of the company's assets if the company is wound up.

The separation between the shareholder and the company has one other important consequence. If a company is wound up, its shareholders will lose their stake, but their separateness from the company will prevent its creditors from pursuing them for fulfilment of its debts. If, on the other hand, an unincorporated business should go bankrupt, its owners, who do not enjoy such separation, will be liable for its debts.

Because a company can do certain things—it can acquire rights and duties and assets and liabilities—albeit only through the actions of human beings who are authorised to act on its behalf, the company is itself regarded as a juristic person. It has rights and duties, but not the body, of a natural person.

=== Size ===
Companies range from the very small to the very large. There are no very large businesses which are not companies. (Even the John Lewis Partnership in the United Kingdom, which promotes itself as "the world's largest partnership", is in fact a company.) Part of what allows companies to become so much bigger than other businesses is their ability to raise capital more easily (which is in turn connected to a company's separation from its mortal owners), and the fact of their being better regulated than other businesses, which gives confidence to investors.

=== Shareholders ===
It is important at the outset to appreciate what, exactly, is meant by "holding a share in a company." The fact that a person is a shareholder of Pick n Pay does not entitle him to go along to one of its branches and leave it with an unpaid-for basket of groceries in his possession. His share in Pick n Pay does not take the form of its stock.

Shareholders are the owners of one or more units of equal value into which the company is divided and which, usually, have been sold in order to raise money either for the company itself or for its founders.

== History ==
Before the Industrial Revolution, companies were a relatively rare business form. Until 1844, there was no comprehensive legislation governing companies, so that they had to be incorporated by a specific Act of Parliament, or by the granting of a royal charter in Europe. Such was the case with the British East India Company in 1600 and the Dutch East India Company in 1602.

The Joint Stock Companies Act 1844 was the first piece of legislation which would be recognised as modern company law, but it was fairly limited in scope. The concept of limited liability, for instance, was not considered. This omission was remedied by the Joint Stock Companies Act 1856, which also introduced the suffix "Ltd" to the company name. It is still in use today.

The first South African company legislation was the Companies Act of 1926, which was based on the Transvaal Companies Act, which was in turn based on the British Companies (Consolidation) Act 1908. The next major South African legislation in this area was the Companies Act of 1973, which remained in force until 31 April 2011.

=== Companies Act of 2008 ===
The 1973 Act had over the years been amended on numerous occasions to bring it up to date; it had as a consequence, like the Income Tax Act, become unwieldy. Changes in society, and in the way the international community expects businesses to operate, also demanded the introduction of new concepts like stakeholder rights and corporate governance. The 1973 Act was seen as unnecessarily rigid; a more business-friendly approach was demanded, which would encourage entrepreneurship and thereby economic and employment growth. These factors combined to spur the enactment of new legislation.

==== Drafting ====
The process of drafting the new Act was strife-ridden and "messy," with the result that the Act which was passed by parliament, and then assented to by the President in April 2009, was found to contain numerous obvious flaws. After the ensuing uproar, work began immediately on amending the Act, which had not yet come into force.

==== Companies Amendment Bill ====
The result was the Companies Amendment Bill, which was introduced into the National Assembly on 27 October 2010, and which amended about half of the Act's 225 sections. A further Amendment Bill, with further corrections and changes, was published on 15 March 2011.

The Act was widely expected to come into force on 1 April 2011, but in fact did so only on 1 May 2011. (The exception to this was Chapter XIV, which is to come into force at a later date, still to be decided.)

== Types of companies ==
The types of companies provided for and regulated by the new Act are set out in sections 8 and 11(3)(c). Broadly speaking, they comprise external companies, non-profit companies and profit companies, in which last are included state-owned companies, private companies, personal liability companies and public companies. The old distinction between "widely held companies" and "limited interest companies," introduced by section 6 of the Corporate Laws Amendment Act has been abolished by the 2008 Companies Act.

=== Non-profit companies ===
The non-profit company (NPC) is dealt with in Schedule 1 to the Act, and is regarded as a successor to the section 21 company in the 1973 Act. An NPC must be incorporated by three or more persons, and formed for a lawful purpose. That purpose must relate to the public benefit; otherwise it must have an object relating to one or more cultural or social activities, or communal or group interests. These may include the promotion of religion, arts, sciences, education, charity or recreation.

The income and property of an NPC are not distributable to its incorporators, members, directors, officers or persons related to any of these people (except to the extent permitted by item 1(3) of Schedule 1). All profits are to be applied solely to the promotion of the NPC's main object.

Upon its winding-up, deregistration or dissolution, the remaining assets of the NPC must be given or transferred to another NPC with similar objects, to be determined by the members of the association or, if they fail to do so, by a court.

An NPC is different from an NPO (non-profit organisation). An NPC may register, but is not obliged to register, as an NPO with the Registrar of NPOs. Organisations which are not companies, and therefore not NPCs (charitable trusts, for example) may also register as NPOs. The difference, in other words, is that NPOs are not limited to companies.

=== Profit companies ===
A profit company is a category of company which includes a number of sub-categories. First and foremost, a profit company is incorporated for the purpose of financial gain to its shareholders. It may be incorporated by one or more persons, or by an organ of state.

=== State-owned companies ===
A state-owned company is a new form of a company which was introduced by and must be registered in terms of the 2008 Act, and which either falls within the meaning of "state-owned enterprise," in terms of the Public Finance Management Act, or is owned by a municipality, as contemplated in the Local Government: Municipal Systems Act, and is otherwise similar to a "state-owned enterprise," as defined above. The name of a state-owned company ends with the expression "SOC Ltd."

=== Private companies ===
A private company must have at least one member. A profit company that is not state-owned, its Memorandum of Incorporation must

- prohibit it from offering any of its securities to the public; and
- restrict the transferability of its securities.

The 2008 Act initially proposed retaining the "(Pty) Ltd" designation from the 1973 Act. The first Amendment Bill deleted the "Ltd," and the second reinstated it, so that the name of a private company still ends with "(Pty) Ltd."

=== Personal liability companies ===
The personal liability company is regarded as a successor to the section 53(b) company of the 1973 Act. This is a company

- which meets the criteria, stated already, for a private company; and
- whose Memorandum of Incorporation states that it is a personal liability company.

The directors, both past and present, are jointly and severally liable for the contractual debts and liabilities of the personal liability company. The liability of a director is limited, however, to the company's contractual debts and liabilities, and therefore does not include delictual or statutory liability.

The name of a personal liability company ends with the designation, "Incorporated" or "Inc.".

=== Public companies ===
A public company is incorporated by one or more persons associated for a lawful purpose. It may raise capital from the general public, and its shareholders enjoy free transferability of shares and interests in the company. There is a compulsory regime of disclosure for public companies.

The name of a public company ends with "Ltd."

=== Public versus private companies ===
The following are a few of the differences between public and private companies:

- The name of a private company ends with "(Pty) Ltd;" that of a public company ends with "Ltd."
- The transferability of shares is restricted for a private company, but there is free transferability of shares and interests for a public company.
- Private companies make no offer of shares to the public, but public companies, whose shares may be listed on a stock exchange, may raise capital from the general public.
- A private company need not lodge financial statements with the CIPC (formerly CIPRO, formerly the Registrar of Companies), whereas a public company must.
- Voting rights in a private company may be freely regulated in the Memorandum of Incorporation; voting rights in a public company are proportional to the number of shares the voter holds.
- A member of a public company may, but a member of a private company may not, appoint more than one proxy.
- Quorum for a general meeting of a private company is two members; for a public company, three.
- The auditor of a private company may also be the secretary or bookkeeper, but this is not permitted in a public company.
- The owners are fully in control at this state, all the profit generated belongs to them and they have full access of the internal business system.

=== External companies ===
External companies are those foreign companies which carry on business or non-profit activities within the Republic of South Africa, subject to sections 23(2) and 23(2A). What constitutes "carrying on business" was radically altered by the insertion of section 23(2A) with the first Amendment Bill. The result was that the majority of foreign companies undertaking transactions or making investments in South Africa will now not be required to register as external companies.

=== Close corporations ===
Since 1 May 2011, it has been impossible to incorporate a new close corporation in South Africa. There are, however, still hundreds of thousands of close corporations in existence. They are regulated chiefly by the Close Corporations Act.

A close corporation is a juristic person distinct from its members. It enjoys perpetual succession, and its members have limited liability. It has the capacity and the powers of a natural person, and is encumbered by a minimal number of formalities. It may be formed by a single person. It does not deal in shares and share capital; instead, there are "members' interests," which are determined as a percentage of ownership.

There are, with close corporations, no strict rules relating to the maintenance of capital, and they also enjoy flexibility in the arrangement of their internal relationships. There are no directors: All members have an equal say, but they carry the risk of personal liability. The fiduciary duties and duties of care and skill are codified, and the accounting and disclosure provisions are less extensive for a close corporation than for, say, a public company.

==== Advantages ====
The following rank among the advantages of a close corporation:

- There is simplicity of management.
- The close corporation may acquire the interest of a member.
- Only annual returns need be submitted.
- The close corporation is permitted to hold shares in a company.

==== Disadvantages ====
- Every member may bind the close corporation's credit.
- It must remain small, or else it must convert to a company

==== Membership ====
Close corporations are limited to a membership of between one and ten natural persons. The requirements for membership are laid out in section 29 of the Close Corporations Act. To become a member, a person must

- be entitled to a member's interest;
- be a trustee of a mortis causa trust;
- be a trustee of an estate; or
- be a trustee of an inter vivos trust.

In Blesovsky v Shipper, the court held that, in terms of section 29(2)(c) of the Act, the executor of deceased estate is permitted to hold a member's interest in a close corporation only if the deceased held a member's interest at time of his death. A person may cease to be a member in the following circumstances:

- if he voluntary disposes of his interest;
- if such disposal is forced due to insolvency or attachment;
- if he dies, in which case disposal will proceed (as in Blesovsky) in terms of his will;
- if the close corporation is deregistered or liquidated; and
- by order of court on the application of any member.

===== Member's interest =====
A member's interest in a close corporation is expressed as a percentage of the close corporation's total financial interest. It does not have to correspond with the percentage of that member's contribution.

The member's interest is a personal right against the close corporation. It entitles him to a pro rata share in the aggregate of the members' interests, as well as to participate in a distribution of the profits and, on liquidation, the remaining assets after all creditors have been paid. He thus has a financial interest in the failure or success of the close corporation.

In Stellenbosch Farmers' Winery v Distillers Corp. is explained the contrast between a mere pecuniary interest and an actual legal right:

The fact that the shareholder is entitled to an aliquot share in the distribution of the surplus assets when the company is wound up proves that he is financially interested in the success or failure of the company but not that he has any right or title to any assets of the company.

A member's interest may be acquired either directly from the corporation or from an existing member.

===== Fiduciary duties =====
Members owe fiduciary duties to the close corporation. The Act gives an overview of the fiduciary duties and sets out to define some of them without prejudice to the generality of the expression "fiduciary relationship." Members must act honestly and in good faith, and exercise their powers to manage or represent the close corporation in its best interests and for its benefit. If there is a breach of these duties, the member will be liable to the close corporation for any loss suffered or benefit derived.

Although the Act gives examples of the fiduciary duties owed by members, those merely supplement the common-law duties, which remain applicable. In Robinson v Randfontein Estates Gold Mining, the Appellate Division refused to recognise the separate legal personality of a subsidiary where Robinson had attempted to use it as a device for evading the fiduciary duties he owed to the holding company as director. The court held that the subsidiary company was no different from the holding company, because it was a mere device or camouflage to allow Robinson to evade his fiduciary duties to the holding company. In Cohen v Segal, the court held that a dividend may not be declared which has the effect of diverting a portion of the corpus of the company (or close corporation) to the shareholders. A dividend may, therefore, generally speaking, be declared only out of profits, and a resolution which declares a dividend to be paid out of the capital of the company is ultra vires the company.

===== Duties of care and skill =====
Members must act with due care and skill. If they breach this duty, they will be liable to the close corporation for any loss caused. The degree of care and skill required is that which may reasonably be expected from a person of the particular member's knowledge and experience.

== Sole proprietorships ==
A sole proprietorship is a single-owner enterprise. Its owner must be a living natural person, but need not have legal capacity. There are certain restrictions, however, for unrehabilitated insolvents.

== Partnerships ==
A partnership is a relationship between people, arising out of an agreement. Cohabiting couples, partners in crime and attorneys supply examples of the word's common usage. In a legal and commercial sense, "partnership" refers to an association of two or more persons who carry on as co-owners of a business for profit.

== Cooperatives ==
A cooperative is an autonomous association of persons united voluntarily to meet their common economic and social needs and aspirations through a jointly owned enterprise, democratically controlled, and organised and operated on co-operative principles.

== Trusts ==
A trust exists whenever someone is bound to hold and administer property on behalf of another, and not for the benefit of the holder.

== See also ==
- Company
- Companies law
- Corporate law
- Law of South Africa
- Partnership
- Trust law
- United Kingdom company law
- United Kingdom partnership law
