= Law of South Africa =

Countries (in pink) which share the mixed South African legal system

South Africa has a 'hybrid' or 'mixed' legal system, formed by the interweaving of a number of distinct legal traditions: a civil law system inherited from the Dutch, a common law system inherited from the British, and a customary law system inherited from indigenous Africans (often termed African Customary Law, of which there are many variations depending on the tribal origin). Under the post-apartheid democratic system, the country operates a system of constitutional supremacy, by which all ordinary sources of law are subordinate to the Constitution of South Africa.

The various influences on South African law have a complex interrelationship, with the English influence most apparent in procedural aspects of the legal system and methods of adjudication, and the Roman-Dutch influence most visible in its substantive private law. As a general rule, South Africa follows English law in both criminal and civil procedure, company law, constitutional law and the law of evidence; while Roman-Dutch common law is followed in the South African contract law, law of delict (tort), law of persons, law of things, family law, etc. With the commencement in 1994 of the interim Constitution, and in 1997 its replacement, the final Constitution, another strand has been added to this weave.

Besides South Africa itself, South African law, especially its civil law and common law elements, also forms the basis of the laws of Botswana, Eswatini, Lesotho, Namibia, and Zimbabwe, which were introduced during the process of colonisation. Basutoland (Lesotho) received the law of the Cape Colony in 1884, and Bechuanaland (Botswana) and Southern Rhodesia (Zimbabwe) received it in 1891. Swaziland (Eswatini) received the law of the Transvaal Colony in 1904, and South-West Africa (Namibia) received the law of the Cape Province in 1920, after its conquest by South Africa.

== The Constitution of the Republic of South Africa ==
The Constitution of the Republic of South Africa Act, No. 108 of 1996 is the piece of legislation against which each prior piece of legislation must be judged and if necessary be amended, and it is backdrop which has coloured each subsequent piece of legislation promulgated.

It was negotiated after the collapse of the race-based apartheid government and the political redefinition of South Africa. During the negotiations around this change the Interim Constitution of the Republic of South Africa Act, No. 200 of 1993 held the fort, as it were, until the final Constitution of the Republic of South Africa, 1996, was negotiated and promulgated. The Interim Constitution was repealed by the Constitution of the Republic of South Africa, 1996.

The Constitution of the Republic of South Africa holds the all-important Bill of Rights, sets up the administrative, judicial and political systems and structures, defines provincial and municipal systems and structures, provides for the passing of laws to necessary to enforce aspects of the Constitution, and sets up institutions such as the Human Rights Commission, which are necessary to safeguard the ideals contained in the Constitution.

The Constitution of the Republic of South Africa Act, 1996, is very much the torch held up by the population of South Africans as the light to guide them. However, there has increasingly been an increasing number of challenges to the Constitution and institutions it set up, such as the Constitutional Court and the South African Human Rights Commission ("SAHRC").

These challenges have emanated from within the ruling party, the African National Congress ("ANC"), and its two allies, the huge labour confederation the Congress of South African Trade Unions ("COSATU"), and the South African Communist Party ("SACP"). For example, the Constitutional Court was recently referred to as "counter-revolutionary" by the Secretary-General of the ANC, and the HRC's order that the leader of the ANC Youth Brigade apologise for statements that he would kill to protect the President of the ANC, Mr Jacob Zuma, from what he considered to be an unfair legal process into corruption charges against Mr Zuma, was largely ignored, as were supporting statements by and a similar order in relation to the leader of COSATU and the SACP.

== Legislation ==
Aside from national legislation, South Africa also has provincial legislation, and local government legislation (often called "by-laws").

=== Provincial legislation ===
South Africa's nine provinces each produce a number of statutes a year, in areas for which they have either concurrent, or exclusive, legislative competence under section 104 of the Constitution of the Republic of South Africa Act, 1996. (See Schedule 4 of the Constitution for a list of the functions areas in respect of which a province may legislate).

=== Local government legislation ===
South Africa's municipalities may, in terms of the Constitution of the Republic of South Africa, 1996, make by-laws for the effective administration of the matters it has a right to administer. The areas within which a municipality may make by-laws are listed in Schedule 4 Part B, and Schedule 5 Part B, of the Constitution.

== Court system in South Africa ==
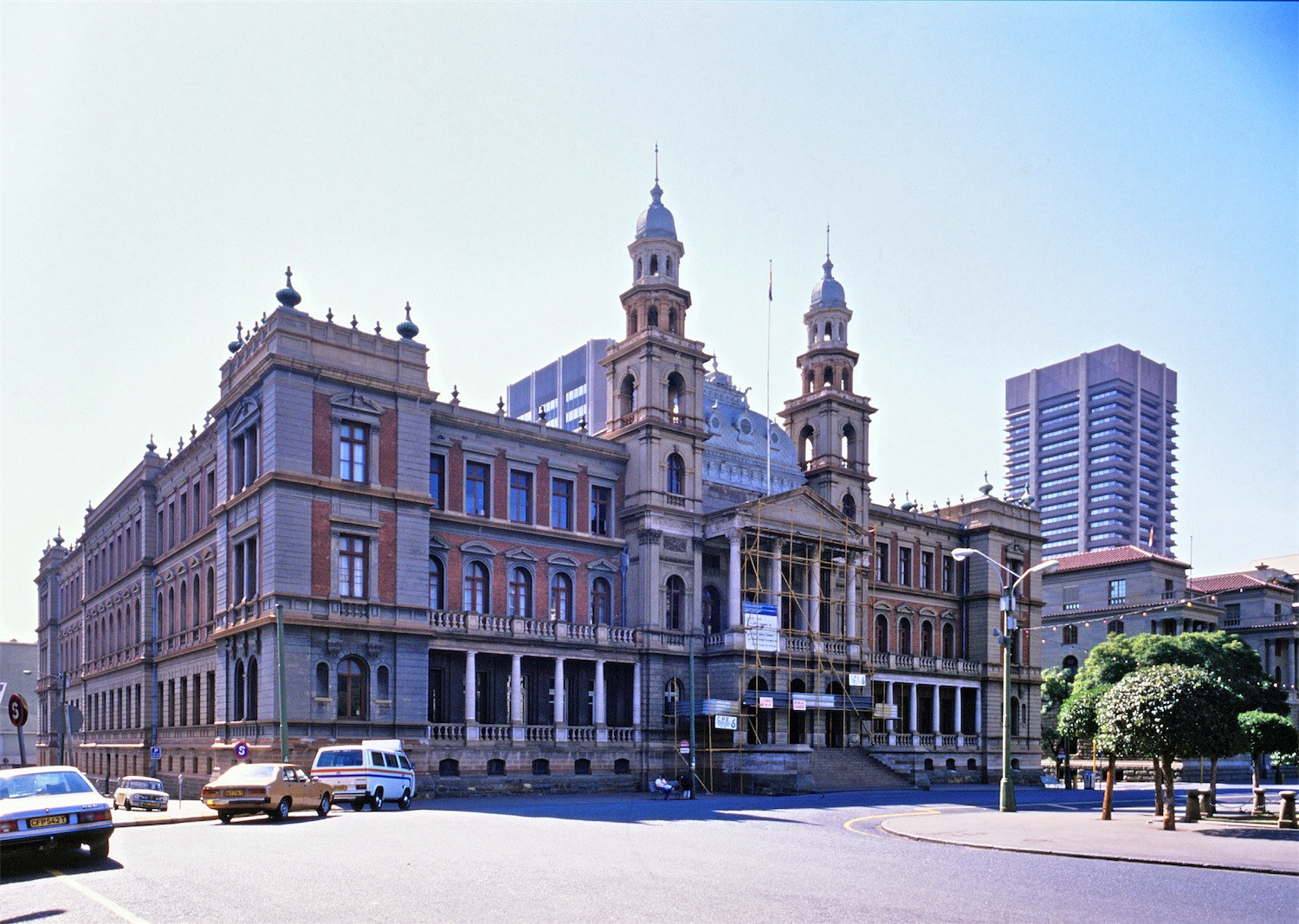
The Palace of Justice in Pretoria, seat of the High Court of South Africa Gauteng Regional Division, Pretoria

The South African court system is organised in a clear hierarchy by Chapter 8 of the Constitution of the Republic of South Africa, and consists of (from lowest to highest legal authority):

- A number of Magistrates' Courts (both smaller Regional and larger District).
- A single High Court with multiple divisions across the country, both regional (having jurisdiction over the entire province) and smaller local division (having a geographically smaller jurisdiction, usually over a heavily populated regions) introduced by the Superior Courts Act, 2013. This is seen in Gauteng, which has both the High Court of South Africa Gauteng Division, Pretoria which sits in Pretoria, and the High Court of South Africa Gauteng Local Division, Johannesburg which sits in Johannesburg. All High Court names have been clarified by the Chief Justice.
- The Supreme Court of Appeal (SCA), a purely appellate court (court of second instance), which previously held joint apex jurisdiction with the Constitutional Court, until the Constitution Seventeenth Amendment Act altered the hierarchy.
- Finally, the Constitutional Court is South Africa's apex court. Since the Constitution Seventeenth Amendment Act, the Constitutional Court has been the apex court in constitutional matters and all other matters. Section 167(3)(b)(ii) of the Constitution of South Africa which states that the Constitutional Court may decide "any other matter, if the Constitutional Court grants leave to appeal on the grounds that the matter raises an arguable point of law of general public importance which ought to be considered by that Court". The Constitutional Court has final authority to decide whether an issue is constitutional or not, as per s167(3)(c) of the Constitution of South Africa.

A number of specialised courts have also been created by legislation to deal with specialised areas of law important to the public as well as to avoid a backlog in the main legal administration infrastructure. These courts exist alongside the court hierarchy; their decisions are thus subject to the same process of appeal and review through the normal courts, starting at a specific level depending on the specialised court in question. Examples include the Competition Appeal Court, the Electoral Court, the Land Claims Court, and the Labour and Labour Appeal Court.

African indigenous courts, which deal exclusively with indigenous law matters, also form part of the South African legal system. A draft Traditional Courts Bill aimed at introducing a Traditional Court below, or on the same level as the Magistrates' Courts was introduced to the National Assembly in January 2017. The legislation was assented to by President Cyril Ramaphosa in September 2023.

== History ==
=== The Roman-Dutch period (1500–1809) ===
Until 1795, the United Provinces of the Netherlands was a sovereign independent state. Together with the other territories of the Netherlands, it was organised into a fairly free commonwealth informally known as the Dutch Republic. It was originally a rural territory, but the rapid speed of development during the 15th century changed it into a trading centre. Germanic custom, feudal law, and the law merchant were no longer sufficient to settle the disputes which arose in everyday trade, so the Dutch turned to the more advanced ius commune. Initially, it was applied in subsidium to fill in gaps in existing customary law on a case-by-case basis. Then, in the 15th and 16th centuries, it was received in complexu (as a system) to such an extent that at the beginning of the 17th century the great Dutch lawyer Huig de Groot (Grotius) could describe this fusion (or joining together) of Dutch and Roman principles as a "new" mixed legal system with its own content. This was how Roman-Dutch law began, led first and foremost by the doctrinal writers of the Hollandse elegante school. It was later to form the basis of the present common law in South Africa and Sri Lanka in a form that had been expanded by what were called the placaaten which was the legislation of that period.

=== Prior to 6 April 1652 ===
With the failure of the indigenous inhabitants as well as the successive Dutch and British colonial governments to record the laws of pre-colonial southern Africa, there is a dearth of information about laws prior to the colonisation of South Africa. However, the current South African legal system has recognised the significance of these, and they have been incorporated into the overall legal system, functioning as district/local courts where appropriate.

=== 6 April 1652 until 1910 ===
From 6 April 1652 landing of the Dutch in the Cape of Good Hope, the Roman-Dutch legal system and its legislation and laws took increasing hold, holding sway until the Union of South Africa as a dominion of the British Empire was formed on 31 May 1910. Even after this and to date, wherever English law does not stand, Roman-Dutch law forms the bedrock to which South Africa turns in its search for clarity in its law.

=== 31 May 1910 until 1961 ===
From the union of the Cape Colony, Natal, Transvaal and Orange River Colony in 1910 as a dominion within the British Empire called the Union of South Africa, and prior to the formation of the Republic of South Africa in 1961, much of English law was incorporated into or formed the basis of South African law. The jury system was abolished in 1969, and cases are decided by a judge alone, sometimes assisted by two assessors. English law and the Roman-Dutch law which held sway prior to this period form the bedrock to which South Africa even now turns in its search for clarity in its law, and where there is a vacuum in its law.

== Specific fields of law ==
- Constitutional law – Legal interpretation and application of the Constitution
- Common law
- Customary law – Unwritten laws practised by indigenous communities
- Law of agency – Legal relationships between principals and third parties
- Criminal law – Law relating to crime
- Contract law – Law about agreements between two or more parties
- Law of delict – Law of compensation for a civil wrong
- Property law – Important aspects of redistribution agreement
- Law of sale – Law related to purchases and sales
- Landlord and tenant law – Regulates contracts for leasing, letting and hiring
- Company law – Regulates corporations formed under the Companies Act
- Law of partnerships and trusts – Regulates corporations formed under the Companies Act
- Insolvency law – Handling of persons who are unable to pay their debts
- Labour law – Regulates relationships between employers, employees and trade unions
- Copyright law – Governs the right to control the use and distribution of artistic and creative works
- Patent law – Regulates patents of inventions
- Law of persons – Regulates the birth, private-law status and the death of natural persons
- Family law – Legal rules pertaining to familial relationships
- Law of succession – Law regarding estate inheritance
- Administrative law – Law over public authorities
- Civil procedure – Civil procedure in RSA
- Criminal procedure – Process of administering the criminal law
- Legal interpretation – Judicial interpretation of laws in South Africa
- Environmental law – Legal rules relating to management of the environment
- Education law

== See also ==
- Advocates in South Africa
- Attorneys in South Africa
- In re Dube (1979)
- List of national legal systems
- Legal education in South Africa
- List of law schools in South Africa
- Patent attorney: South Africa

=== Articles on specific South African legislation ===
- Constitution of South Africa – Supreme law of South Africa
- List of acts of the Parliament of South Africa
- South African Statutes and other Legislation
- South African environmental law – Legal rules relating to management of the environment
