= Sea Harvest Corporation v Duncan Dock Cold Storage =

South African legal case

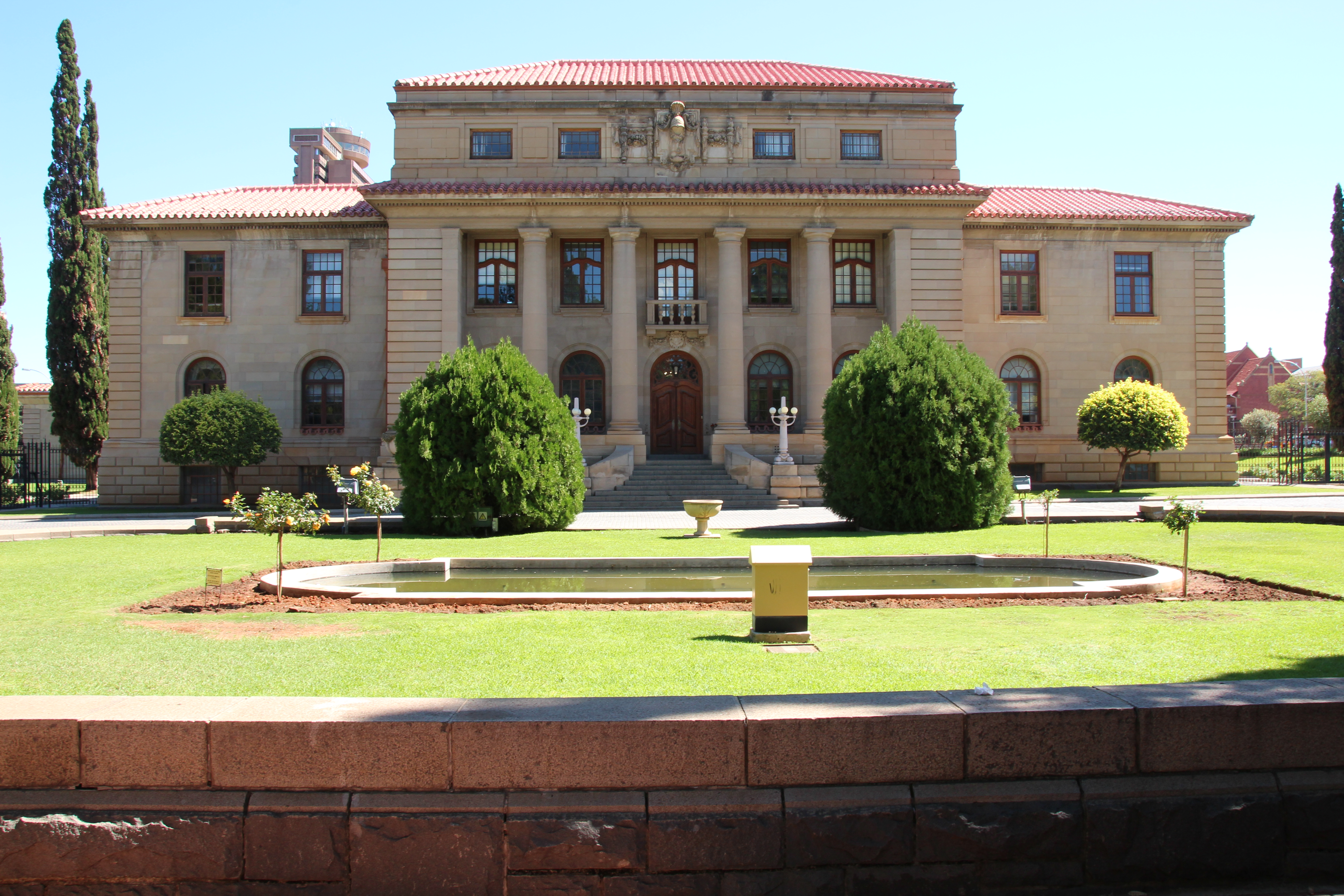
- Court: Supreme Court of Appeal (South Africa)
- Full case name: Sea Harvest Corporation (Pty) Ltd and Another v Duncan Dock Cold Storage (Pty) Ltd and Another
- Decided: 26 November 1999
- Docket nos.: 12/97
- Citations: [1999] ZASCA 87; 2000 (1) SA 827 (SCA)

Court membership
- Judges sitting: Scott, Smalberger, Howie, Marais and Streicher JJA

Case opinions
- Decision by: Scott JA (Smalberger, Howie and Marais concurring)
- Concurrence: Streicher JA

Keywords
- Delict; determining the issue of culpa before the issue of wrongfulness; foreseeability in relation to culpa

Sea Harvest Corporation (Pty) Ltd and Another v Duncan Dock Cold Storage (Pty) Ltd and Another is an important case in South African law of delict, particularly on the question of negligence. It was decided in the Supreme Court of Appeal in November 1999 with a judgment written by Judge of Appeal Douglas Scott.

== Background ==
The first respondent, Duncan Dock Cold Storage, owned a cold store on a berth in Table Bay Harbour, located on land owned by the second respondent, Portnet (itself a part owner of Duncan Dock Cold Storage). On 1 January 1993, the cold store and its contents were set alight, and largely destroyed, by a distress flare fired by an anonymous reveler during New Years celebrations. Among the contents was property (fish and fish products) owned by the appellants, Sea Harvest Corporation and South Atlantic Islands Development Corporation, which had been stored there in terms of oral contracts of deposit with Duncan Dock Cold Storage. The appellants sued for damages, founding their claims on the contracts and alternatively in delict.

The appellants alleged that the respondents had been negligent in failing to install a sprinkler system in the cold storage facility. It was common cause among the parties that a sprinkler system would either have extinguished the fire or at least have served to control it. However, at the time, only one or two cold stores in South Africa had sprinkler systems; the same was generally true of cold stores in the United Kingdom and Europe. The applicable South African Bureau of Standards (SABS) code would have required the installation of a sprinkler system for any storage classified as "moderate risk", but not for storage classified "low risk". Because the port area did not fall within the jurisdiction of the local municipality, plans for buildings required the approval of the port engineer rather than that of the city council. The plans for the cold store facility were, nonetheless, submitted to the council's fire department for comment, and the fire department classified the store as "moderate risk". On the other hand, after discussing the fire department's assessments with the project engineer and architect, and consulting the National Building Regulations and SABS code, the port engineer concluded that the correct classification of the building was "low risk" and that a sprinkler system was accordingly not required. None was therefore installed.

Despite the prohibition against the firing of distress flares in the harbour, other than for the purposes of assistance, it appeared that the firing of flares at midnight on New Year's Eve had been a regular occurrence. But there was no evidence that a flare had ever previously caused a fire in the harbour or its surrounding areas.

In the Cape Provincial Division, Judge Edwin King found in favour of the respondents on the issue of liability. An appeal was heard in the Supreme Court of Appeal on 1 and 2 November 1999, and judgment was delivered on 26 November 1999.

== Judgment ==
The Supreme Court of Appeal was unanimous in dismissing the appeal and confirming the lower court's judgment. The majority judgment was written by Judge of Appeal Douglas Scott and joined by Judges of Appeal J. W. Smalberger, Craig Howie, and Robin Marais; Judge of Appeal Piet Streicher wrote a separate concurrence with different reasons.

For the court, Scott held that the true enquiry was whether, in all the circumstances, the project engineer (who had designed the facility and who, as project leader, had co-ordinated the work of various professional firms engaged to assist in the project) had been negligent in failing to install a sprinkler system, and whether the port engineer's failure to insist upon its installation had been both wrongful and negligent.

Whether what had been labelled as the relative theory of negligence (articulated in Mukheiber v Raath) or what had been labelled as the absolute or abstract theory of negligence (articulated in Kruger v Coetzee) was adopted, the true criterion for determining negligence turned ultimately on whether, in the particular circumstances, the conduct complained of fell short of the standard of the reasonable person. Whichever formula were adopted, the court held that there should always be a measure of flexibility to accommodate "grey area" cases: the need for various limitations to the broadness of the enquiry where circumstances so demanded had long been acknowledged. It had thus been recognised that, while the precise or exact manner in which the harm had occurred need not have been foreseeable, the general manner of its occurrence must have been reasonably foreseeable.

There could be no doubt that, as a general possibility a fire in the cold store had reasonably been foreseeable; indeed, fire extinguishers and hose reels had been installed at various places within the building to guard against that eventuality. It was also true that the causes of fire were varied and many. But what was reasonably foreseeable had necessarily to be confined to those fires that, whatever their cause, fell within the parameters of reasonable possibility. What would, typically, have been reasonably foreseeable in this instance would have been the possibility of a fire starting somewhere in the building itself. The reasonable foreseeability of this general possibility – of just any fire – did not imply culpability for damage resulting from some specific danger which in truth had not foreseeable as a reasonable possibility. Thus, in the circumstances of this case, the question of culpability had to be determined not simply by asking whether a fire, any fire, had been foreseeable but whether a reasonable person in the position of the project engineer or the port engineer would have foreseen the danger of fire emanating from an external source on the roof of the building with sufficient intensity to ignite the gutter.

Given that the building was relatively isolated in relation to other buildings in the harbour area, there was nothing about its locality rendering it more vulnerable to fire. The region, furthermore, was not prone to lightning of the kind which would set fire to buildings. Save for a burning flare, it was difficult to conceive of any other source of fire which could have set the roof alight from above. Bearing in mind that distress flares had been designed to burn out at a height of not less than 150 feet and that, notwithstanding the long-standing practice of firing off flares to celebrate the New Year, there had never been a fire caused in that fashion, the court held that, even if the project engineer and port engineer had known of the practice (which, they testified, they had not), the possibility of a flare landing while still burning and setting fire to the gutter of a building constructed with an otherwise non-combustible shell was so remote as not to have been reasonably foreseeable.

The court held, accordingly, that the evidence had established that the danger of fire emanating from an external source on the roof of the building with sufficient intensity to ignite the gutter had not been reasonably foreseeable; or, expressed differently, that a reasonable person in the position of the project engineer and port engineer would not have foreseen the danger as real enough to warrant precautionary measures.
