= DE v RH =

South African legal case

- Court: Constitutional Court of South Africa
- Full case name: DE v RH
- Decided: 19 June 2015
- Docket nos.: CCT 182/14
- Citations: [2015] ZACC 18; 2015 (5) SA 83 (CC); 2015 (9) BCLR 1003 (CC)

Case history
- Prior action: RH v DE [2014] ZASCA 133 in the Supreme Court of Appeal
- Appealed from: E v H [2013] ZAGPPHC 11 in the High Court of South Africa, Gauteng Division

Court membership
- Judges sitting: Mogoeng CJ, Moseneke DCJ, Cameron J, Froneman J, Khampepe J, Madlanga J, Nkabinde J, Jappie AJ, Molemela AJ and Theron AJ

Case opinions
- The act of adultery by a third party lacks wrongfulness for purposes of a delictual claim of contumelia and loss of consortium; it is not reasonable to attach delictual liability to it.
- Decision by: Madlanga J (unanimous)
- Concurrence: Mogoeng CJ (Cameron concurring)

Keywords
- Actio iniuriarum; adultery; contumelia; injury to personality; delict; loss of consortium; protection of marriage; right to dignity; right to privacy; wrongfulness of adultery

DE v RH is a decision of the Constitutional Court of South Africa in the law of delict. The court abolished the third-party delictual claim for adultery, holding unanimously that society's contemporary boni mores indicated that the act of adultery by a third party lacks wrongfulness and therefore does not give rise to delictual liability. The judgment was handed down without papers on 19 June 2015 and was written by Justice Mbuyiseli Madlanga, with a separate concurrence by Chief Justice Mogoeng Mogoeng.

== Background ==
Mr DE and Ms H, a married couple, ceased to cohabitate in March 2010 when Ms H left their home; she filed for divorce in June 2010. A divorce order was granted in September 2011. Mr DE averred that their marriage was happy until 2010, when it broke down because Ms H engaged in adultery with Mr RH. Ms H did not deny the adulterous relationship, but averred that her marriage had begun to deteriorate in 2008 and that she had not become romantically involved with Mr RH until after she left the marital home in 2010.

== High Court action ==
Mr DE sued Mr RH in the High Court of South Africa for damages arising from the extramarital affair between Mr RH and Ms H. He sued on the Actio iniuriarum, claiming both loss of consortium and contumelia. The South African common law had long recognised a right of action in delict against third parties for adultery on these grounds, most recently affirmed in the Gauteng High Court in Wiese v Moolman.

Relying on Wiese, Acting Judge L. I. Vorster of the Pretoria High Court found in favour of the plaintiff, awarding damages in an amount of R75,000 to Mr DE. Vorster acknowledged that "the marriage of the plaintiff was under some stress as a result of the resentment of [Ms H toward her husband, Mr DE]", but found that, "I am, however, not persuaded that such problems as there were could not have been satisfactorily dealt with in the process of marriage counseling had the defendant not interfered as he did."

== Supreme Court action ==
Mr DE appealed to the Supreme Court of Appeal. The appeal was heard in August 2014, and Judge Fritz Brand handed down judgement on 25 September 2014 on behalf of a unanimous bench. He was critical of the trial court's treatment of the facts, finding that they appeared to have been influenced by the court's "considerable personal sympathy with the plaintiff", but nonetheless agreed that, given the trial court's factual findings, existing common law allowed the award of damages from contumelia (though he disagreed with the trial court on loss of consortium). However, the Supreme Court raised mero motu the question of "the justification for the continued existence in our law of the delictual claim for adultery", and it concluded that "in the light of the changing [boni] mores of our society, the delictual action based on adultery of the innocent spouse has become outdated and can no longer be sustained; that the time for its abolition has come". On this basis, Mr DE's appeal was upheld.

Mr DE appealed to the Constitutional Court of South Africa, arguing that the abrogation of the delictual action raised constitutional issues, notably the imperative to protect the value of marriage (a value which he claimed was acknowledged in section 15(3) of the Constitution) and the imperative to protect the non-adulterous's spouse right to dignity (recognised in section 10). On 19 June 2015, the Constitutional Court gave judgment on the papers without an oral hearing.

== Judgment ==
In a unanimous judgment written by Justice Mbuyiseli Madlanga, the Constitutional Court dismissed Mr DE's appeal, affirming the "well-reasoned judgment" of the Supreme Court of Appeal and upholding its order. The apex court agreed with the Supreme Court that the boni mores of society suggested that the act of adultery no longer met the element of wrongfulness required for delictual liability.

Moreover, the court was not persuaded by Mr DE's constitutional arguments. First, it did not accept an imperative for courts to intervene in the institution of marriage in order to preserve it. Though Mr DE cited Dawood v Minister of Home Affairs and Minister of Home Affairs v Fourie to show that there was precedent for judicial action in defence of marriage, Madlanga wrote that the present case arose in a different context:

In both these cases [Dawood and Fourie], the removal of legal obstacles amounted to the protection of marriage. Here, we face different considerations. The applicant wants the law to use punitive measures to come to his aid as the non-adulterous spouse. In this case, the marriage deteriorated without obstruction or intervention by the law. The distinction is not insignificant. It is one thing for the law to protect marriages by removing all legal obstacles that impede meaningful enjoyment of married life. It is quite another for spouses to expect the law to prop up their marriage which – for reasons that have nothing to do with the law – is weakening or disintegrating... The obligation pre-eminently rests on the spouses themselves to protect and maintain their marriage relationship.

Second, the court acknowledged the non-adulterous spouse's right to dignity and agreed that adultery could infringe upon this right. However, pointing particularly to the loss of privacy suffered by the litigants during the trial proceedings, Madlanga held that:

Nevertheless, this potential infringement of dignity must be weighed against the infringement of the fundamental rights of the adulterous spouse and the third party to privacy, freedom of association and freedom and security of the person. These rights demand protection from state intervention in the intimate choices of, and relationships between, people.

A concurring judgment, written by Chief Justice Mogoeng Mogoeng and joined by Justice Edwin Cameron, sought to emphasise the first point about the proper role of the law in marriage, arguing that, "The law cannot shore up or sustain an otherwise ailing marriage. It continues to be the primary responsibility of the parties to maintain their marriage. For this reason, the continued existence of a claim for damages for adultery by the 'innocent spouse' adds nothing to the lifeblood of a solid and peaceful marriage."
