= Douglas Scott (judge) =

South African judge

The Honourable Douglas Scott

Judge of the Supreme Court of Appeal
- In office 1 January 1996 – 2008

Judge of the Cape Provincial Division
- In office 8 June 1989 – 31 December 1995

Personal details
- Born: Douglas Graham Scott; 19 January 1941 (age 85) Simon's Town, Cape Province; Union of South Africa
- Children: Helen Scott
- Education: University of Cape Town

Douglas Graham Scott (born 19 January 1941) is a retired South African judge who served in the Supreme Court of Appeal between 1996 and 2008. Formerly an advocate in Cape Town, he joined the bench in 1989 as a judge of the Cape Provincial Division.

== Early life and career ==
Scott was born on 19 January 1941 in Simon's Town, Cape Town. After matriculating at Wynberg Boys' High School in 1958, he attended the University of Cape Town, where he completed a BA in 1962 and an LLB in 1964. While a student, he worked briefly as a clerical assistant at the magistrate's court in Cape Town.

He was admitted as an advocate of the Supreme Court of South Africa in May 1965 and worked as a government prosecutor in Pretoria and Bellville until the end of 1966. Thereafter he returned to Cape Town to complete his articles at the firm of Findlay and Tait, gaining admission as an attorney in December 1968. He practised as an attorney for less than a year before returning to practice as an advocate in August 1969, now at the Cape Bar. He took silk on 18 November 1986.

== Judicial career ==
Scott joined the judiciary on 8 June 1989 as a judge of the Cape Provincial Division of the Supreme Court. On 1 January 1996, he was elevated to the Appellate Division of the Supreme Court. He was appointed to the appellate court by the first post-apartheid president, Nelson Mandela, and he remained on the court after it was reformed into the post-apartheid Supreme Court of Appeal.

His notable judgments in the court included Sea Harvest Corporation v Duncan Dock Cold Storage, an important 1999 decision in the law of delict. He also wrote for the court in Durban's Water Wonderland v Botha.

Scott retired from the South African judiciary in 2008. Thereafter he served as a judge, and ultimately as acting president, of the Lesotho Court of Appeal.

== Personal life ==
Scott was married to Gillian Scholtz, who died in 2015. Their daughter, Helen Scott, is a legal academic.
