= Afrox Healthcare v Strydom =

South African legal case

- Court: Supreme Court of Appeal of South Africa
- Full case name: Afrox Healthcare Beperk v Christiaan George Strydom
- Decided: 31 May 2001
- Citations: [2002] ZASCA 73; 2002 (6) SA 21 (SCA)

Court membership
- Judges sitting: Nienaber, Harms, Zulman, Mpati and Brand JJA

Case opinions
- Decision by: Brand JA

Keywords
- Disclaimer against negligence of nursing staff – Public interest

Afrox Healthcare Ltd v Strydom, an important case in South African contract law, was heard in the Supreme Court of Appeal (SCA) on May 13, 2002, with judgment handed down on May 31.

== Facts ==
The appellant, Afrox Healthcare, was the owner of a private hospital. The respondent, Strydom, had been admitted to the hospital for surgery and post-operative medical treatment. On his admission, the parties concluded an agreement, of which it was a tacit term, according to Strydom, that Afrox's nursing staff would treat him in a professional manner and with reasonable care. The admission document, however, signed by Strydom during his admission to the hospital, contained an exemption clause, providing that he

absolved the hospital and/or its employees and/or agents from all liability and indemnified them from any claim instituted by any person (including a dependant of the patient) for damages or loss of whatever nature (including consequential damages or special damages of any nature) flowing directly or indirectly from any injury (including fatal injury) suffered by or damage caused to the patient or any illness (including terminal illness) contracted by the patient whatever the cause/causes are, except only with the exclusion of intentional omission by the hospital, its employees or agents.

After the operation, certain negligent conduct by a nurse led to complications which caused Strydom to suffer damages. Strydom argued that this conduct amounted to a breach of contract and instituted an action holding Afrox responsible for the damages.

== Arguments ==
Afrox relied on the exemption clause to avoid liability for Strydom's damages. Strydom, in response, advanced several reasons why the provisions of the clause could not operate against him, contending

- that it was contrary to the public interest;
- that it was in conflict with the principles of good faith or bona fides; and
- that it had been the legal duty of the admission clerk to draw his attention to the relevant clause. This had not been done.

The grounds on which Strydom based his reliance on the public interest were

1. the alleged unequal bargaining positions of the parties at the conclusion of the contract;
2. the nature and ambit of the conduct of the hospital personnel for which liability was excluded; and
3. the fact that Afrox was the provider of medical services.

Strydom alleged that, while it was Afrox's duty as a hospital to provide medical treatment in a professional and caring manner, the relevant clause went so far as to protect it from even gross negligence on the part of its nursing staff. This was contrary to the public interest.

Strydom argued further that the Constitution of the Republic of South Africa obliges every court, when developing the common law, to promote the spirit, purport and object of the Bill of Rights. In considering the question of whether or not a particular contractual term conflicts with the public interest, account must be taken of the fundamental rights contained in the Constitution. Strydom argued that the relevant clause conflicted with the spirit, purport and object of the constitutional guarantee of every person's right to medical care, and as such was in conflict with the public interest.

In the alternative, Strydom contended that, even if the clause was not in conflict with the public interest, it was still unenforceable, because unreasonable, unfair and in conflict with the principle of bona fides or good faith.

As a further alternative, he argued that he had, when signing the admission document, been unaware of the provisions of the clause. The evidence was that he had signed the document without reading it, even though he had had an opportunity to do so, but Strydom contended that the admission clerk had had a legal duty to inform him of the content of the clause and had failed to do so. Strydom's reason for alleging such a duty was that he did not expect a provision of that kind to be found in an agreement with a hospital.

A Provincial Division found for Strydom.

== Judgment ==
In an appeal, the SCA held that, as far as exclusionary and indemnity clauses were concerned, the common legal approach is that they should be interpreted restrictively. The fact that such clauses are generally held to be operative does not mean that a specific exclusionary clause cannot be declared contrary to public policy and as such unenforceable. The standard to be applied in respect of exclusionary clauses is no different from that applicable to other contractual terms which are invalid as a result of considerations of public policy. The question is whether upholding the relevant clause or other term would conflict with the interests of the public as a result of extreme unfairness or other policy issues.

The court found, however, that there was no evidence indicating that Strydom had indeed occupied a weaker bargaining position than Afrox during the conclusion of the contract, and that he had not relied on gross negligence on the part of Afrox's nursing staff in his pleadings. The question of whether the contractual exclusion of a hospital's liability for damages caused by the gross negligence of its nursing staff was in conflict with the public interest was accordingly not relevant to the instant matter; furthermore, even if that were the case, it would not entail the automatic invalidity of the relevant clause. The provisions would probably rather have been restricted to exclude gross negligence.

With regard to the constitutional argument, the court held that it had first to be decided whether section 39(2) of the Constitution empowered and obliged the Court to consider constitutional provisions not yet in operation when the contractual relationship between the parties had commenced. The agreement had been concluded in August 1995, whereas the Constitution had only become operative in February 1997.

With regard to direct damages, the Constitution had no retrospectivity. Conduct which was valid when it was committed was accordingly not rendered retrospectively invalid as a result of the direct application of the Constitution. The question, however, surrounding the possible retrospective influence of the Constitution in an indirect manner, as envisioned in section 39(2), had not been pertinently decided; it was unnecessary, though, to try to answer that question in the present matter. For the purposes of the judgment, it was accepted in favour of Strydom that the provisions of section 27(1)(a) of the Constitution had to be taken into account, even though the section had not been operative at the time of the conclusion of the relevant agreement.

In considering the question of whether or not a particular contractual provision was in conflict with the interests of the community, the values underpinning the Constitution had to be taken into account. The elementary and basic general principle was that it was in the public interest that contracts entered into freely and seriously, by parties having the necessary capacity, should be enforced. Strydom's contention—that a contractual term in which a hospital could exclude liability for the negligent conduct of its nursing staff was not in the public interest—could accordingly not be supported.

It appeared from the judgment of the court a quo that it had been of the opinion that the principles of stare decisis as a general rule did not apply to the application of section 39(2) of the Constitution. That opinion was, at least as far as post-constitutional decisions were concerned, clearly incorrect. As far as pre-constitutional decisions of the SCA regarding the common law were concerned, a distinction had to be drawn between three situations which could develop in the constitutional context:

1. where the High Court was convinced that the relevant rule of the common law was in conflict with a constitutional provision, in which case the court was obliged to depart from the common law, as the Constitution was the supreme law;
2. where the pre-constitutional decision of the SCA was based on considerations such as boni mores or public interest, in which case, if the High Court was of the view, taking constitutional values into account, that such a decision no longer reflected the boni mores or public interest, it was obliged to depart from the decision, which would not be in conflict with the principles of stare decisis, as it had to be accepted that boni mores and considerations of public policy were not static concepts; and
3. where a rule of the common law, determined by the SCA in a pre-constitutional decision, was not in direct conflict with any specific provision of the Constitution, where the decision was also not reliant on any changing considerations such as boni mores, but where the High Court was nevertheless convinced that the relevant common-law rule, upon the application of section 39(2), had to be changed to promote the spirit, purport and object of the Constitution—in which case the principles of stare decisis still applied and the High Court was not empowered by the provisions of section 39(2) to depart from the decisions of the SCA, whether such decisions were pre- or post-constitutional.

Although abstract considerations such as good faith or bona fides were the basis and reason for the existence of legal rules, and also led to the creation and amendment of those rules, the court held they were not in themselves legal rules. When it came to the enforcement of contractual terms, the Court had no discretion and did not operate on the basis of abstract ideas; it operated on the basis of established legal rules.

The court found further that a person who signed a written agreement without reading it did so at his own risk and was consequently bound by the provisions contained therein as if he were aware of them and had expressly agreed thereto. There were exceptions, such as in the event of a legal duty to point out certain of the provisions in the contract, but Strydom's subjective expectations about the content of the agreement played no role in the question of whether a legal duty rested on the admission clerk to point out the content of the exclusionary clause to him. What was important was whether or not such a provision was, objectively speaking, unexpected.

Today, the court found, exclusionary clauses in standard contracts were the rule rather than the exception. There was no reason in principle to differentiate between private hospitals and other service providers. The relevant clause in the admission document was accordingly not, objectively speaking, unexpected. The admission clerk had accordingly had no legal duty to bring it to Strydom's attention, and Strydom was bound by the terms of the clause as if he had read and had expressly agreed to it.

The appeal was thus upheld and the decision in the Transvaal Provincial Division in Strydom v Afrox Healthcare Bpk reversed.

== See also ==
- South African contract law
