= Mayne v Main =

South African legal case

Mayne v Main is an important case in South African law. It was heard in the Supreme Court of Appeal (SCA) on 1 March 2001, with judgment handed down on 23 March. Smalberger ADCJ, Nienaber JA, Farlam JA, Mpati JA and Mthiyane AJA presided. A. Subel SC appeared for the appellant and JPV McNally for the respondent. The appellant's attorneys were Knowles, Husain Inc, Sandton, and McIntyre & Van der Post, Bloemfontein. The respondent's attorneys were Webber, Wentzel, Bowens, Johannesburg, and Webbers, Bloemfontein. The case was an appeal from a decision of the Full Court in the Witwatersrand Local Division (Stegmann J, Blieden J and Malan J).

The issue was whether or not the High Court had jurisdiction, in terms of the Supreme Court Act, on grounds of residence. Central to this issue was the meaning in that statute of the phrase "residing [...] in." The SCA restated the basic principles of jurisdiction. Although a person can have more than one residence, for the purposes of the relevant section of the Act a person could only reside in one place at any given moment. Residence as a concept, the court held, conveys a certain sense of stability or something of a settled nature. Some greater degree of permanence than a mere fleeting or transient presence is needed to satisfy the requirement of residence. The court advocated what it described as a "common-sense and realistic approach" when considering residence, as modern-day conditions and attitudes, and the tendency to a more transient lifestyle, might otherwise lead to persons to avoid too easily the jurisdictional nets of the courts. The subjective belief of a person whose residence is in issue, furthermore, cannot detract from the justifiable inference to be drawn from the relevant facts and circumstances.

== Facts ==
The appeal turned on whether the Witwatersrand Local Division (WLD) had had the jurisdiction to entertain an action by the appellant against the respondent for the payment of certain sums of money and ancillary relief. In particular, it had to be decided whether the respondent had, on 18 April 1995 (the date of service of summons), been a person "residing [...] in" the area of jurisdiction of the WLD within the meaning of that phrase in section 19(1)(a) of the Supreme Court Act. Both a single judge and a full bench of the court, on appeal, had decided against the appellant's standpoint that the respondent had resided within the jurisdiction of the WLD at the relevant time.

The respondent was a South African citizen involved in corporate finance consulting. The nature of his job entailed extensive travel to many countries. He conducted his business in a highly mobile manner without being tied down by conventional office and secretarial needs. From around 1993, however, the respondent's work had required him to spend more and more time in South Africa, although he still travelled to, and continued to work in, various other parts of the world.

The respondent owned property in the UK, but from 1994 spent very little time in that country. In fact, during the years 1994 and 1995, the majority of the respondent's time was spent in South Africa, particularly in Johannesburg. The respondent had set up an office in Johannesburg, was leasing a motor vehicle for his personal use and was cohabiting with one Mrs Rowand in Inanda.

The respondent contended that, despite his near-constant presence in the country over the time period in question, he had no intention of making South Africa his home and staying there permanently. The respondent argued that the doctrine of effectiveness had relevance to the issue of residence and contended that he could only be considered to have been resident in the trial Court's area of jurisdiction if his presence there at the relevant time had been of a nature which would enable the Court to grant a judgment which would normally be effective against a person in his position.

== Judgment ==
In a further appeal, Smalberger ADCJ held—and Nienaber JA, Farlam JA, Mpati JA and Mthiyane AJA concurred—that the basic principles regarding jurisdiction were as follows:

- In giving a court statutory jurisdiction over a person residing in its area, the legislature had simply followed the common-law rule of actor sequitur forum rei.
- The question of jurisdiction was one of residence, not domicile.
- A person could have more than one residence, in which case he had to be sued in the court having jurisdiction at the place where he was residing at the time summons was served.
- A person could not be said to reside at a place he was temporarily visiting; nor could he cease to reside at a place even though he was temporarily absent on certain occasions and for short periods of time.
- There was no precise or exhaustive definition of the word "resides." The fact of residence depended on all the circumstances of the matter at hand seen in the light of all the applicable general principles.

The court held further that, although a person could have more than one residence, for the purpose of section 19(1)(a) of the Act a person could only be residing in one place at any given moment. There had to be some good reason for regarding a particular place as the place of ordinary habitation for the respondent at the date of service. Residence as a concept conveyed a certain sense of stability or something of a settled nature; accordingly a greater degree of permanence than a merely fleeting or transient presence was necessary to satisfy the requirement of residence.

Smalberger advocated a "common-sense and realistic" approach when considering residence. Modern-day conditions and attitudes, and the tendency towards a more itinerant lifestyle, particularly among business people, required this. Not to do so might allow certain persons to avoid the jurisdictional nets of the courts and escape legal accountability for their wrongful actions.

The evidence revealed, to Smalberger's mind, that the respondent was essentially a peripatetic businessman, but that he nonetheless remained free to choose what work to accept and where. The evidence pointed to a heightened degree of stability and permanence in relation to the respondent's presence in South Africa and particularly in Johannesburg, where he spent the greater portion of his time. The overall duration of his stays over the relevant period of time indicated more than temporary visitations. There was no indication that the respondent was conducting substantial business elsewhere at the time. Because of the respondent's romantic involvement and cohabitation with Mrs Rowand, it was further acceptable that the respondent was not in Johannesburg simply for the purpose and duration of his work.

Any mental reservation which the respondent might have had about residing in Johannesburg could not, the court held, detract from the justifiable inference, having regard to all the relevant facts and circumstances, that he was so residing for the purposes of section 19(1)(a). For the purposes of jurisdiction, South African courts did not recognise the concept of a vagabundus. Accordingly, the respondent had to have been residing somewhere on 18 April 1995. The mere fact that the respondent may have maintained a residence in London did not mean that he was residing there; nor was his presence in London indispensable to the way in which he conducted his business.

The court decided, accordingly, that the appellant had succeeded in establishing a strong prima facie case on the facts that the respondent had been residing in Johannesburg when the summons was served upon him on 18 April 1995. His prolonged presence there, the ongoing nature of his work and his romantic attachment to Mrs Rowand all contributed to the required degree of stability and permanence being present at that time. No acceptable alternative place suggested itself where the respondent could have been residing at the relevant time. Whatever the respondent's subjective belief might have been, the objective facts led to a different conclusion. Johannesburg was accordingly the respondent's "place of ordinary habitation" on 18 April 1995; he was residing there for the purposes of section 19(1)(a) of the Act. The trial Court therefore had the jurisdiction to entertain the appellant's action. The appeal was thus allowed and the decision of the full court of the Witwatersrand Local Division, in Mayne v Main, reversed.
