= Le Roux v Dey =

South African legal case

- Court: Constitutional Court of South Africa
- Full case name: Le Roux and Others v Dey
- Decided: 8 March 2011
- Docket nos.: CCT 45/10
- Citations: [2011] ZACC 4; 2011 (3) SA 274 (CC); 2011 (6) BCLR 577 (CC)

Case history
- Prior actions: Supreme Court of Appeal – Le Roux and Others v Dey [2010] ZASCA 41; High Court of South Africa, North Gauteng – Dey v Le Roux en Andere (21377/06) (28 October 2008, unreported)

Court membership
- Judges sitting: Ngcobo CJ, Moseneke DCJ, Cameron J, Froneman J, Khampepe J, Mogoeng J, Nkabinde J, Skweyiya J, Yacoob J and Brand AJ

Case opinions
- Decision by: Brand AJ (Ngcobo, Moseneke, Khampepe, Mogoeng and Nkabinde concurring)
- Concur/dissent: Froneman and Cameron JJ
- Dissent: Yacoob J (Skweyiya concurring)
- Dissent: Skweyiya J

Keywords
- Actio iniuriarum; children's rights; defamation; freedom of expression; humiliation; injury to personality; jest; wrongfulness

Le Roux and Others v Dey is a 2011 decision of the Constitutional Court of South Africa in the South African law of delict. It was the court's first decision on alleged defamation by a minor. A majority of the court upheld the award of monetary damages to a high school vice-principal who had been defamed by three of his pupils through the publication of a digitally manipulated photo.

== Background ==
The case arose in 2006 from the conduct of three students at Hoërskool Waterkloof in Pretoria. The first student, fifteen-year-old Hendrick Pieter Le Roux, crudely digitally manipulated a photo of two naked bodybuilders so that it appeared to depict the school's principal and vice-principal engaged in sexual activity. Le Roux sent the photo to a friend, who sent it on to seventeen-year-old Burgert Christiaan Gildenhuys; Gildenhuys printed the photo out to show it around at the school, and a third student, seventeen-year-old Reinardt Janse van Rensburg, placed the picture on the school's notice board.

The vice-principal depicted in the picture, Louis Dey, sued the three students. He sought sentimental damages for humiliation (the infringement of dignity) and defamation (the infringement of reputation). The students, however, argued that the publication of the picture was intended as a joke and perceived as such. They therefore denied that their conduct met the element of wrongfulness required for delictual liability under the actio iniuriarum, insofar as they lacked animus iniuriandi (intent to injure the plaintiff).

== Prior actions ==
=== High Court ===
The suit was heard in the High Court of South Africa, and the Pretoria High Court upheld both of Dey's claims, finding that the publication of the doctored image inflicted both humiliation and defamation. The court awarded damages in a composite amount of R45,000. The three students appealed the judgment to the Supreme Court of Appeal, and the judgment was additionally cross-appealed by Dey, who sought damages in a higher amount and a costs order on a more stringent scale.

=== Supreme Court of Appeal ===
On 30 March 2010, the appellate court dismissed the students' appeal and upheld Dey's cross-appeal. Writing for the majority, Deputy Judge President Louis Harms agreed with the lower court that the picture was defamatory and its publication wrongful. He held that the requirement of animus iniuriandi for delictual liability did not generally require "consciousness of wrongfulness". Moreover, he dismissed the students' argument that "jest excludes the intention to injure". The students' counsel had correctly conceded that the students' intent was to ridicule Dey, and that was sufficient to establish their liability. The majority also found in Dey's favour on costs, though it did not increase the High Court's R45,000 award.

However, the Supreme Court of Appeal diverged from the High Court in dismissing Dey's second claim, that based on an asserted affront to dignity. Harms wrote that a single defamatory act could not give rise to two causes of actions on the actio iniuriarum; the cause of action based on defamation itself encompassed the second cause of action, because "any defamation is in the first instance an affront to a person’s dignity which is aggravated by publication. Someone who is not affronted by a publication and who does not feel humiliated will not sue for defamation."

Acting Judge of Appeal Bennie Griesel was the only dissenting vote in the Supreme Court of Appeal: he agreed with the majority's order but dissented on the finding of defamation. Griesel held that the court was obliged to consider the natural meaning of the picture to its intended audience, the defendants and their classmates; to this audience, he argued, the picture would be immediately recognisable as an "attempt at humour". Citing Justice Albie Sachs's concurrence in Laugh It Off Promotions v South African Breweries, Griesel held that the tastelessness of a joke did not "transform a bad joke into a defamatory statement". However, Griesel agreed with the majority that

it is not open to the defendants to rely on jest as a defence against the claim based on iniuria. It does not protect them in these circumstances where they foresaw the possibility that their attempts at humour might be perceived as insulting, offensive or degrading by the plaintiff.

In this regard, Griesel held that the defendants' conduct did amount to an actionable impairment of the plaintiff's dignity. He therefore supported the majority's order.

== Constitutional Court judgments ==
The three students appealed the Supreme Court of Appeal's judgment to the Constitutional Court of South Africa. The matter was heard in the Constitutional Court on 26 August 2010, and judgment was handed down on 8 March 2011.

The bench was split along several, partly overlapping lines. The justices filed four separate judgments: a majority judgment by Acting Justice Fritz Brand, joined by five other justices; a minority judgment co-written by Justices Johan Froneman and Edwin Cameron; another minority judgment written by Justice Zak Yacoob and joined by Justice Thembile Skweyiya; and a final minority judgment written by Justice Skweyiya alone. An additional introduction, attributed to the Court, outlined the court's order and the justices' various points of agreement and disagreement. The order upheld the three students' appeal insofar as it set aside the R45,000 damages award in favour of a R25,000 award. It also set aside the favourable costs order that the Supreme Court of Appeal had granted to Dey; the students were ordered to pay costs in the High Court only. However, the students were also ordered to tender an unconditional apology to Dey.

The order itself was written by one of the minorities, Froneman and Cameron, but had the concurrence of Brand's majority judgment. The justices were unanimous in joining Justice Yacoob's factual exposition and determination on the grant of leave to appeal and the dismissal of an application to lead further evidence; they were also unanimous in joining Froneman and Cameron's argument about apology as a remedy.

Of the eight justices who supported the court's order, six – those who joined in Brand's judgment – did so by upholding the Supreme Court of Appeal's finding of defamation. Froneman and Cameron agreed with Acting Judge of Appeal Griesel, the lone dissenter in the Supreme Court, that Dey had not been defamed but that his dignity had been actionably injured. All eight agreed on the legal principles to be applied in adjudicating defamation, wrongfulness, and animus iniuriandi.

Justice Yacoob dissented, finding that the majority's judgment did not adequately protect children or their freedom of expression, while Justice Skweyiya both joined in Yacoob's dissent and wrote a separate opinion to elucidate his reasons.

== Reception ==
The judgment attracted academic interest for its attempt to "constitutionalise" the common law of personality and for Cameron and Froneman's revival of the amende honorable as a remedy for civil delict. However, several legal commentators were highly critical of the majority judgment, including on the grounds that it neglected children's rights and the best interests of the child. It was also criticised in the mainstream media.

The Mail & Guardian also noted that all of the justices except Mogoeng Mogoeng had expressed concurrence with paragraphs 181 to 189 of Cameron and Froneman's minority judgment, which set out that "It is not, and should not be considered to be, an actionably injurious slight to offend someone’s feelings by merely classing them in a condition the Constitution protects", as the students' image of Dey classed him as homosexual. The newspaper pointed out that, "in what must surely be unique in South African legal history", Mogoeng had not written to provide reasons for dissenting from this point, and argued that he was obligated to do so.
