= Mafesa v Parity Versekeringsmaatskappy =

South African legal case

Mafesa v Parity Versekeringsmaatskappy Bpk (In Likwidasie) is an important case in South African law. It was heard in the Orange Free State Provincial Division on 15 and 16 February 1968, with judgment handed down on 29 February. The presiding officer was Smit RP.

The case is especially important in the law of delict, as an illustration of the concept of the nova causa interveniens. The plaintiff's leg had been broken in a collision, and he was discharged from hospital after the bone had clinically sufficiently knitted. Shortly thereafter, however, his crutches slipped on a smooth floor and the bone broke again. The court found that the fall had been caused by the plaintiff' own carelessness, and that the defendant was not liable for the prolongation of the recovery. The court also disallowed costs for the doctor's qualifying expenses.

== Facts ==
In an action for damages for personal injuries which he sustained in a collision, it appeared that the plaintiff, a black man named Mafesa, had suffered a fracture of the right femur and tibia. After the leg had clinically set sufficiently, he was discharged from hospital. He had been given crutches to walk with, as his leg was still in splints. He was told not to place any weight on the leg, as it could break again.

The next month he slipped and fell and again broke the thighbone. He had been walking on his crutches on a smooth floor when the crutches had slipped away from under him. He had known that the floor was smooth and also that the crutches were liable to slip, because at that time they had not had rubber tips. Mafesa had to undergo a second operation, and his recovery was prolonged for six months.

== Judgment ==
The court held that the defendant was responsible for the damage sustained as a result of the collision, but that the fall had been caused by the plaintiff's own carelessness. The defendant was not liable for the damage caused thereby: The fall was an intervening cause which broke the causal effect of the original negligence. As no evidence had been adduced to show that the plaintiff's doctor had incurred special expenses in qualifying, the court held that plaintiff's request for his qualifying expenses should not be allowed.

== See also ==
- Delict
- Law of South Africa
- South African law of delict
