= Smit v Abrahams =

South African legal case

Smit v Abrahams is an important case in South African law. It was heard in the Appellate Division on March 15, 1994, with judgment handed down on May 16. Botha AR, EM Grosskopf AR, Kumleben AR, Van Den Heever AR and Mahomed Wn AR were the judges.

The case is especially important in the area of delict, bearing on the question of the remoteness of damages and a plaintiff's impecuniosity. The plaintiff in this case had seen his vehicle, which he had used in his business as a hawker, irreparably damaged in a collision. In order to continue his business, he had hired another vehicle for three months, but had been unable to afford the purchase of another vehicle.

A rule of English law has it that expenses resulting from the plaintiff's impecuniosity are in principle irrecoverable. This rule has no right of existence in South African law, however, as its rigidity is inconsistent with the flexible approach whereby a South African court will consider on the basis of policy considerations whether there is a sufficiently close connection between act and consequence. The impecuniosity of the plaintiff, the court asserted, is merely a fact to be considered together with all other facts. The reasonable foreseeability of damages is not decisive, but it can be used as a subsidiary test in the application of a flexible criterion. The court held that it is dangerous to attempt to distill fixed or generally applicable rules or principles from a process of comparison with other cases.

In the present case, the court held that the plaintiff's conduct in hiring another vehicle was not unreasonable, having regard to the predicament in which he found himself; nor would it be unreasonable or unjust towards the defendant to hold him liable for compensation for such loss.

== Facts ==
A bakkie belonging to Abrahams had been irreparably damaged in a collision with a vehicle driven by Smit. Abrahams had used the bakkie in his hawker's business. In an action for damages in a magistrate's court against Smith, Abrahams had claimed

1. payment of the market value of the bakkie; and
2. compensation for the rental (for three months) which Abrahams had paid for the use of another vehicle which he had had to hire in order to conduct his business.

It appeared from the evidence that Abrahams had not been in a financial position to afford purchasing another vehicle, or even to pay the deposit.

Smit's claim succeeded in the magistrate's court, and an appeal to a Provincial Division against the award of damages on the second claim failed.

== Judgment ==
There can be no doubt, the court held in a further appeal, that in South African law the ratio of Liesbosch Dredger v Steamship Edison (regarding damages consisting of expenses incurred as a result of the plaintiff's impecuniosity) has no right of existence. The rigidity of the rule is inconsistent with the flexible approach followed in South African law, as explained in S v Mokgethi, in particular the flexible criterion whereby the court considers on the basis of policy considerations whether there is a sufficiently close connection between act and consequence. There is no room for the employment of the ratio of The Edison in a system where legal causality is determined by asking the following question: Is there a sufficiently close connection between act and consequence? That question has to be answered on the basis of policy considerations and the limits of reasonableness, fairness and justice. The court found that the impecuniosity of the plaintiff as a joint cause of the damage is merely one of the facts which, together with all the other facts of each particular case, has to be taken into consideration in the application of the predominating flexible criterion (the oorheersende elastiese maatstaf) in terms of which the court determines whether the defendant should be held liable for the damages in question.

The question as to the reasonable foreseeability of the damages cannot, the court held, be regarded as the single decisive criterion in determining liability. Reasonable foreseeability can indeed be used as a subsidiary test in the application of the flexible criterion, but it cannot displace it. The importance and efficacy of the predominating criterion in resolving questions of legal causality lies in its flexibility. Any attempt to detract from its flexibility should be resisted. Comparisons between the facts of the case which has to be resolved and the facts of other cases in which a solution has already been found, or which might hypothetically arise, can obviously be useful and of value, and sometimes even decisive, but one should be careful not to attempt to distill fixed or generally applicable rules or principles from the process of comparison. The argument that the plaintiff's claim should "in principle" be rejected was misplaced. There is only one principle: In order to determine whether or not the plaintiff's damages were too remote from the defendant's act to hold the defendant liable, considerations of policy, reasonableness, fairness and justice should be applied to the particular facts of the case.

The court held that the respondent had been placed in a quandary which had been caused by the act of the appellant, and that the respondent's conduct in reaction thereto had been reasonable in all respects: To regard his shortage of money and consequent inability to purchase a bakkie as an obstacle to the recovery of his expenses in hiring a vehicle would be unfair and unjust towards him. The period of three months during which the respondent had kept his business going with a hired bakkie was not unreasonably long as against the appellant: It was not unfair or unjust to hold the appellant liable for the expenses which the respondent had incurred during that period in order to maintain his income. As a matter of policy, the damages suffered by the respondent should be the responsibility of the appellant.

The court held, accordingly, on the facts, that the respondent, having regard to the predicament in which he had found himself, had not acted unreasonably in hiring a bakkie for a period of three months, and that it was not unfair or unjust to the appellant to hold him liable for the compensation of the respondent's damages. The appeal was dismissed and the decision in the Cape Provincial Division, in Smit v Abrahams thus confirmed, but for different reasons.

== See also ==
- Delict
- Law of South Africa
- South African law of delict
