= Minister van Polisie v Van der Vyver =

South African legal case

Minister van Polisie v Van der Vyver is an important case in South African law.

== Facts ==
Frederik van der Vyver was charged with the murder of Inge Lotz in 2005. The trial was "one of the most publicised in recent times, having all the material of great drama: a beautiful young woman student brutally murdered in leafy, conservative Stellenbosch and her lover charged with the murder." Van der Vyver was eventually acquitted.

Van der Vyver then sued the minister of police for damages for malicious prosecution. Judge Anton Veldhuizen found for Van der Vyver on the merits of the claim, a decision taken on appeal to the Supreme Court of Appeal.

The most critical issue concerned a link between a bloodstain on the floor of the deceased's bathroom and a pair of sneakers the accused wore. The latter had claimed as an alibi that he was at his office in Pinelands when the murder occurred. If the State could prove that the accused's shoe made the bloodstain on the bathroom floor, that evidence would have destroyed his alibi.

The police forensic expert, Superintendent Bruce Bartholomew, claimed the accused's shoe made the bloodstain. The police experts in Pretoria needed to be more sure. Bartholomew was, however, "a determined man." He sought and obtained permission to travel to the United States to consult WJ Bodziak, "the leading expert on footprints". Although Bodziak strongly disagreed with Bartholomew's findings and told him so, the tenacious police officer returned home claiming the opposite: that Bodziak agreed with his findings.

A few months later, police legal representatives spoke to Bodziak, who informed them that, in his opinion, there was no link between the shoe and the bloodstain. The state prosecutors were informed accordingly and met Bartholomew to discuss the matter. He admitted he had misrepresented Bodziak's position. Still, the State persisted with its case, and Bartholomew continued with his original theory, which formed the basis of his testimony to the court.

Only after "great expense" incurred by the Van der Vyver family did the court hear the truth, when Bodziak was flown out to give evidence and "totally discredited" Bartholomew's testimony.

The trial court held that, without this disingenuous evidence, the state would have concluded that there was no basis on which to continue the prosecution.

On appeal, Judge Fritz Brand held that the evidence of the State prosecutor was that he would have continued the prosecution, notwithstanding the absence of Bartholomew's evidence about the shoe and its connection to the bloodstain. Brand found the test adopted by the court of whether or not the prosecutor's conduct was unreasonable not to be applicable; the critical point was whether his evidence, tested without the benefit of hindsight, could be rejected by the court.

That finding allowed the appeal court to conclude that a causal link sufficient to support Van der Vyver's claim of malicious prosecution had not, on the probabilities, been proved. In arriving at this conclusion, the court was confronted with a Constitutional Court decision concerning a claim for damages from a prisoner who had contracted tuberculosis in prison. In that case, Lee v Minister of Correctional Services, the Constitutional Court, in finding for the prisoner, had held that the necessary causal link was not to be determined with mathematical precision but instead through the exercise of common sense based on the practical way in which the ordinary person's mind works against the background of everyday life experience.

Brand asserted that this test, although flexible, was no different from the traditional "but-for" or sine qua non-test. In other words, "but for" the decision to continue with Bartholomew's evidence, the State would have abandoned the prosecution. Given the prosecutor's evidence, which could not be rejected, this link had not been proved.

== Criticism ==
"That reading of the test for showing that the pursuit of the discredited forensic evidence was not a sufficient cause for the continuation of the prosecution," wrote The Mail & Guardian's Serjeant at the Bar,

may prove to be an incorrect application of the Lee test. Is it the outcome of common sense that a trial would have continued without the only powerful evidence the state had to show the alibi was suspect?

By answering that question against Van der Vyver, the appeal court may have struck a major blow against the law, holding the police and prosecution to principles of integrity and openness.

Retired South African advocate and legal scholar Gustaf Pienaar has also publicly questioned and criticized the Constitutional Court for failing to supply reasons for dismissing Van der Vyver's application for leave to appeal. He is skeptical of whether a closely reasoned and legally dense application could be dismissed out of hand in a mere two weeks, speculating that the use of Afrikaans in the original trial Court's judgment may have done Van der Vyver no favours (including before the Supreme Court of Appeal). In his view, the Court also missed an opportunity to "defend" its finding in Lee against the Van der Vyver facts.

Pienaar has written to the Constitutional Court's Registrar, not asking for reasons for the dismissal. Still, what criteria had been applied in "sorting" Van der Vyver's application from those deserving of a hearing? He was effectively ignored.

== See also ==
- South African criminal law
- South African law of delict
