= Fritz Brand =

South African judge (born 1949)

The Honourable Fritz Brand SC

Acting Justice of the Constitutional Court of South Africa
- In office 2010–2010

Judge of the Supreme Court of Appeal
- In office 2001–2015

Judge of the High Court of South Africa, Cape Provincial Division
- In office 1992–2001

Personal details
- Born: Frederik Daniël Jacobus Brand; 16 February 1949 (age 77) Paarl, South Africa
- Education: Stellenbosch University
- Profession: Advocate, Judge

Frederik Daniël Jacobus "Fritz" Brand SC (born 16 February 1949) is a former judge of the Supreme Court of Appeal of South Africa.

== Early life and education ==
Brand was born in Paarl and matriculated at the High School Vredenburg in 1966. After school he enrolled at Stellenbosch University and obtained a BA degree in 1970, an LL.B. degree in 1972 and an LL.M. (cum laude) in 1976.

== Career ==
Brand started his career in 1973 as a Senior lecturer at Stellenbosch University and was admitted as advocate in May 1973. He lectured until 1976 and on 10 May 1977 joined the Cape Bar. Brand was granted senior status in November 1989 and in September 1992 he was appointed Judge of the Cape High Court.

He was appointed to the bench of the Supreme Court of Appeal with effect from 1 December 2001. In 2010 he was appointed as an acting judge to the Constitutional Court, for two terms.

Notable judgments written by Brand include Afrox Healthcare v Strydom, Fourway Haulage SA v SA National Roads Agency, and Butters v Mncora. While acting in the Constitutional Court, he wrote for the majority in Le Roux v Dey, and his Supreme Court judgment in RH v DE, which derogated the third-party delictual claim for adultery, was upheld by the Constitutional Court in DE v RH.

He is an international commercial court judge for the Qatar International Court.
