= Standard Bank of South Africa Ltd v OK Bazaars (1929) Ltd =

South African legal case

Standard Bank of South Africa Ltd v OK Bazaars (1929) Ltd is an important case in the South African law of delict, particularly the area of negligent misstatement. It was heard in the Witwatersrand Local Division by André Gautschi AJ from 8–16 February 2000, with judgment handed down on 17 March. JM Suttner SC (with him R. Hutton) appeared for the plaintiff, and LRG Serrurier SC (with him KJ Trisk) for the defendant.

Given that materiality, intention to induce and inducement are requirements for actionable misrepresentation inducing a contract, there was no logical reason the court could find why they should not be elements of the act to be proven (as opposed to the unlawfulness component) of the delictual action for pure economic loss arising out of a negligent misstatement. If that were the case, the plaintiff would be required in respect of the act to establish

- a statement
- which was false;
- that the misstatement was material in the sense that it would have influenced or induced a reasonable man to act or rely thereon;
- that the defendant intended that the plaintiff, or a person in the position of the plaintiff, to act or rely thereon; and
- that the plaintiff in fact acted or relied thereon: that is, he was in fact induced.

These factors wouldn't be considered in the unlawfulness investigation.
