= Nienaber =

Nienaber is a surname. Notable people with the surname include:

- Jacques Nienaber (born 1972), South African rugby union coach
- Peet Nienaber (died 2019), South African judge
- Wickus Nienaber (born 1981), Swazi swimmer
- Wilco Nienaber (born 2000), South African golfer
