= Dukes v Marthinusen =

South African legal case

In Dukes v Marthinusen, the Appellate Division held it to be consistent with principles of the law of delictual liability that a duty cast upon a defendant might be such that it is discharged only if reasonable precautions to avoid harm are actually taken, and that the defendant who appoints another to take those steps, and fails to do, will be liable for the failure. In casu, the defendant had employed an independent contractor to demolish certain buildings. In a claim for damages arising from the negligent performance of the work, Stratford ACJ said the following after considering various cases in South Africa and in England:

The English law on the subject as I have stated it to be is in complete accord with our own, both systems rest the rule as to the liability of an employer for any damage caused by work he authorises another to do upon the law of negligence. It follows from the law as I have stated it to be that the first and crucial question in this case is to ascertain on the facts of the case whether there was a duty on the employer who authorised the demolition of these buildings to take precautions to protect the public using the highway from possible injury. If there was such duty it could not be delegated and the employment of an independent contractor is an irrelevant consideration.

== See also ==
- South African law of delict
