= S v Goliath =

South African legal case

S v Goliath is an important case in South African law. It was heard in the Appellate Division on 24 September 1971, with judgment handed down on 20 March 1972.

On a charge of murder, compulsion can constitute a complete defence. The court held that when an acquittal may occur on such a charge on such a ground will depend on the particular circumstances of each case. The whole factual complex must be carefully examined and adjudicated upon with the greatest care.

The state, the court held, had no full right of appeal. When it reserved a question of law under section 366 of the Criminal Procedure Act which was dependent upon the existence of certain facts, it was necessary for the state to set out those facts properly and in detail in the record as part of the setting out of the question of law.

== See also ==
- Law of South Africa
- South African criminal law
- South African law of delict
