= Minister of Law & Order v Kadir =

South African legal case

In Minister of Law and Order v Kadir, an important 1994 case in both the South African law of delict and South African criminal law, the police had failed to collect information which would have enabled the seriously injured respondent to pursue a civil claim against the driver of the other vehicle. The Minister raised an exception, contending that there was no legal duty on the police to collect such information. The court a quo dismissed this argument, finding that the community would consider otherwise. On appeal, however, it was held that society understood that police functions relate to criminal matters—they are not designed to assist civil litigants—and would baulk at the idea of holding policemen personally liable for damages arising out of a relatively insignificant dereliction. The respondent, therefore, had not proved a legal duty.

== See also ==
- Law of South Africa
- South African criminal law
- South African law of delict
