= International Shipping v Bentley =

South African legal case

- Court: Appellate Division
- Full case name: International Shipping Co (Pty) Ltd v C. F. Bentley
- Decided: 10 November 1989
- Citation: 1990 1 SA 680 (A)

Court membership
- Judges sitting: Corbett CJ, Botha JA, Hefer JA, Smalberger JA and Friedman AJA

Case opinions
- Decision by: Corbett CJ

Keywords
- Law of delict, Causation, Remoteness of damages

International Shipping Co (Pty) Ltd v Bentley is an important case in South African law. It was heard in the Appellate Division on 25 and 26 September 1989, with judgment handed down on 10 November. The presiding officers were Corbett CJ, Botha JA, Hefer JA, Smalberger JA and Friedman AJA. The case is especially important in the law of delict, in the area of causation and on the question of the remoteness of damages. An auditor was sued by a financing company for loss caused by negligent misstatements contained in a report by the auditor of a group of companies. This report was misleading: It did not give an accurate picture of the bleak financial situation of the group for which the company was providing financial facilities. The court found that the auditor had acted negligently and unlawfully, and so established factual causation. On appeal, however, it was held that the company's loss was too remote for the auditor to be held liable. The judgment set out the factors relevant to determining whether or not a loss is too remote.

== Facts ==
The appellant, International Shipping, a company carrying on the business of financiers and shippers, agreed to make certain financial facilities available to the D Group of companies in early 1976. The respondent, Bentley, was appointed auditor to the D Group in November 1977. In March 1979, Bentley issued reports in respect of the financial statements of each of the companies comprising the D Group, as well as its financial statements, for the year ending 20 December 1978. In each of these reports, which were not qualified in any way, Bentley stated that he had examined the financial statements in question and had complied with the requirements of section 300 of the Companies Act, and that, in his opinion, the statements fairly represented the financial position of the company as at 20 December 1978, and the results of its operations for the period then ended, in the manner required by the Companies Act.

International Shipping continued to provide these financial facilities until the liquidation of the companies comprising the D Group in April 1981. At the time of such liquidation, the total indebtedness of the D Group to International Shipping amounted to R977,318, of which only the sum of R593,826 was recovered. International Shipping thus sustained a loss in the amount of R383,492.

In April 1982, International Shipping instituted an action for damages against Bentley in a Local Division, alleging

- that the aforementioned financial statements were materially false and misleading in a number of respects;
- that, in so reporting, Bentley had acted fraudulently or, alternatively, negligently towards International Shipping, which had relied thereon in reviewing and deciding to maintain and increase the facilities accorded to the D Group;
- that, had the 1978 financial statements fairly presented the financial position of the D Group and its constituent companies, International Shipping would have terminated the facilities and have required the Group to make good its indebtedness; and
- that the loss sustained by International Shipping constituted damage which Bentley was accordingly liable to compensate it.

The action was dismissed by the court a quo.

== Judgment ==
International Shipping thereafter brought the instant appeal in which the court held

- that the financial statements were, to some extent, false and misleading;
- that there was no reason for interfering with the court a quo's finding that fraud had not been established; but
- that negligence had been established in regard to some aspects of the financial statements; and
- that unlawfulness had been established in that it could not be said that Bentley had properly complied with his statutory duties in terms of the Companies Act.

The only remaining issue was that of causation.

As far as factual causation was concerned, the court held that the respondent's negligent report on the 1978 financial statements unquestionably constituted a causa sine qua non of the appellant's loss, since a proper and non-negligent performance of his duties as auditor would have obviated the appellant's ultimate loss. With regard to legal causation, the court held that there were a number of factors which tended to separate cause and effect in the instant case, viz

- the time factor, in that two years had elapsed between the respondent's reporting and the loss;
- the decision by the appellant to provide a support programme for the D Group at a stage when it already knew that the Group's financial situation was fairly bleak;
- the fact that the appellant allowed the D Group's indebtedness to escalate;
- the changed relationship between the parties as a result of the implementation of the support programme, in that the appellant and the D Group ceased to deal at arm's length with each other, and the appellant became intimately involved in the administration (or lack thereof) of the D Group;
- the fraud committed by the managing director of the D Group, which played an important part in causing the financial loss which the appellant ultimately incurred;
- the fact that, to some extent, the appellant did not rely on the 1978 financial statements prepared by the respondent; and, lastly,
- the foreseeability of the support programme.

The support programme amounted to uninhibited lending to the D Group without added security, which was the real cause of the appellant's loss. Such a situation was hardly foreseeable in March 1979.

The court held, further, having regard to the above-mentioned factors, that the ultimate loss suffered by the appellant was too remote for legal liability on the respondent's part to arise. The appeal was accordingly dismissed and the decision in the Witwatersrand Local Division, in International Shipping Co (Pty) Ltd v Bentley, confirmed.

== See also ==
- Delict
- Law of South Africa
- South African law of delict
