= Minister of Safety and Security v Luiters =

South African legal case

Minister of Safety and Security v Luiters, an important case in the South African law of delict, was heard in the Constitutional Court on August 17, 2006. Langa CJ, Moseneke DCJ, Madala J, Mokgoro J, Nkabinde J, O'Regan J, Sachs J, Van Der Westhuizen J, Yacoob J and Kondile AJ presided, handing down judgment on November 30. W. Trengove SC and RT Williams SC appeared for the applicant, and HP Viljoen SC and HM Raubenheimer SC for the respondent. The State Attorneys, Cape Town, represented the applicant; the respondent's attorneys were Smith & De Jongh, Bellville.

An application for leave to appeal against a decision of the Supreme Court of Appeal, the case revolved around the question of the vicarious liability of an employer for the delictual acts of an employee: in casu, the liability of the Minister of Safety and Security for criminal acts committed by police officers while off duty. An off-duty policeman had pursued persons who had attempted to rob him, and had in so doing shot an innocent third party. The Minister was held to be as liable for the delictual acts of an off-duty policeman who placed himself on duty as for those of an on-duty policeman. The Minister was therefore vicariously liable to the third party, one Allister Roy Luiters. Once an off-duty police officer puts himself on duty, the court held, that officer, for the purposes of vicarious liability, is in same legal position as the police officer ordinarily on duty.

== Facts ==
The applicant (the Minister) sought leave to appeal against a decision of the Supreme Court of Appeal in which it upheld a decision of the High Court to the effect that the State was liable in damages for the injuries sustained by the respondent when he was shot by a policeman in the employ of the South African Police Services (SAPS) who, although off duty, had placed himself on duty by embarking on a pursuit of suspects. He did so on the basis of his contention that the common-law rules governing vicarious liability ought to be developed so as to distinguish between off-duty policemen who placed themselves on duty and on-duty policemen.

== Judgment ==
Langa CJ, for a unanimous Constitutional Court, dismissed the application on the basis that there were no prospects of success on appeal. The court determined also that, once off-duty police officers are found, on the facts of a particular case, to have put themselves on duty, as they are empowered and required to do by their employer, they are for the purposes of vicarious liability in exactly the same legal position as police officers who are ordinarily on duty.
