= Minister of Police v Ewels =

South African legal case

Minister of Police v Ewels, is an important case in both the South African law of delict and, to a lesser extent, South African criminal law. It expresses a general rule: An omission is to be regarded as unlawful conduct when the circumstances of the case are of such a nature not only that the omission incites moral indignation, but also that the legal convictions of the community demand that it be regarded as unlawful and that the damage suffered be made good by the person who neglected to perform a positive act. In order to make a determination as to whether or not there is unlawfulness, therefore, the question is not whether there was the usual "negligence" of the bonus paterfamilias; the question is whether, regard being had to all the facts, there was a duty in law to act reasonably.

1. Saflii Court case

In casu, a citizen was assaulted in a police station by an off-duty officer in the presence of other officers. It was held by the court, on the facts of this case, that a policeman on duty, if he witnesses an assault, has a duty to come to the assistance of the person being assaulted. The failure of the police to do so made the Minister of Police liable for damages.

== See also ==
- South African criminal law
- South African law of delict
