= Minister of Safety & Security v Van Duivenboden =

South African legal case

In Minister of Safety & Security v Van Duivenboden, an important case in the South African law of delict and South African criminal law, the Supreme Court of Appeal held that, while private citizens may be entitled to remain passive when the constitutional rights of other citizens are threatened, the State has a positive constitutional duty, imposed by section 7 of the Constitution, to act in protection of the rights in the Bill of Rights. The existence of this duty necessarily implies accountability. Where the state, represented by persons who perform its functions, acts in conflict with section 7, the norm of accountability must of necessity assume an important role in determining whether or not a legal duty ought to be recognized in any particular case.
