= Minister of Safety and Security v Road Accident Fund =

South African legal case

Minister of Safety and Security v Road Accident Fund and Another is an important case in the South African law of delict. It was heard in the Natal Provincial Division on November 17, 2000, with judgment handed down the same day. GM MacKenzie was counsel, as State Attorney, for the plaintiff; CJ Hartzenberg SC appeared for the first defendant. There was no appearance for the second defendant. The presiding officer was Combrinck J, to whom fell the adjudication of a stated case in an action for damages arising from a motor vehicle accident.

The case concerned a claim for compensation in terms of the Motor Vehicle Accidents Act The question was whether or not the injuries resulting from the accident were "caused by or [had] aris[en] out of the driving of a motor vehicle" as contemplated in section 8(1) of the Act. Words "caused by" referred to the direct cause of the injury, while the words "arising out of" referred to the case where the injury, although not directly caused by the driving, was nevertheless causally connected with the driving, and where the driving was a sine qua non thereof. Some limitation, however, had to be placed on the application of the sine qua non concept: The court held that it ought to be guided by the object and the scope of the Act, and by notions of common sense. It was possible that, where the direct cause of the damage was some act antecedent or ancillary to the driving, such damage might be said nonetheless to have "aris[en] out of" the driving. The court would have to have regard to the facts of case and to apply ordinary, common-sense standards in determining whether or not there existed a causal connection between the damage and the driving sufficiently real and close to enable it to say that the death or injury had "aris[en] out of" the driving.

In the present case, the spillage of fuel from a stationary vehicle onto the road surface, as a result of the driver's attempt to rectify a fault in the fuel system, that he might continue driving, had caused other vehicles to skid on the fuel and collide, resulting both in injuries and in deaths. These the court found to have "aris[en] out of" the driving of the truck, notwithstanding the fact that the truck was stationary at the time of the accident.

== Facts ==
A collision had occurred between two vehicles when one of them skidded on diesel that had spilled from a truck belonging to the second defendant. The truck had broken down alongside the road. It appeared that, after the truck had broken down, the driver, supposing that there was a problem with the vehicle's fuel supply, opened a stopcock, which permitted diesel fuel to flow into the main fuel tank from another tank. He also opened the filler cap of the main fuel tank, to inspect its interior. Thereafter he not only omitted to close the stopcock, but also omitted properly to replace the filler cap. As a result, diesel escaped from the main fuel tank onto the road surface, thus causing the accident. One person suffered injuries and another died as a result of the accident.

== Judgment ==
The court found that the words "caused by" in section 8(1) of the Motor Vehicle Accidents Act refer to the direct cause of the injury, whereas the words "arising out of" refer to the case where the injury, although not directly caused by the driving, is nevertheless causally connected with the driving and the driving is a sine qua non thereof. An uncontrolled application of the causa sine qua non concept, however, could bring about consequences never contemplated or intended by the Legislature. Combrinck J decided, therefore, that some limitation must be placed on the application of this concept: The Court should be guided by a consideration of the object and the scope of the Act, and by notions of common sense.

Where the direct cause of death or bodily injury is some act antecedent or ancillary to the driving, it could not normally be said that the death or injury was "caused by" the driving, but it might be found to have arisen out of the driving. Whether that could be found would depend upon the particular facts of the case and whether, applying ordinary common-sense standards, it could be said that the causal connection between the death or injury and the driving was sufficiently real and close to enable the court to say that the death or injury did indeed arise out of the driving. The dictum in General Accident Insurance Co South Africa Ltd v Xhego and Others was thus applied.

Combrinck J held, on the facts, that there was a sufficiently close link between the injuries and death, on the one hand, and the driving of the second defendant's truck, on the other, to justify the conclusion that the injuries and death had "arisen out of" the driving of the truck, as contemplated in section 8(1). The very reason why the driver had removed the filler cap of the main fuel tank was because he had experienced trouble while driving the truck. His act in opening the stopcock and removing and replacing the filler cap was intended to rectify the problem, and to allow him to continue driving the vehicle. The direct result of that ancillary act was the spilling of the diesel, which caused the accident and the resultant damage. In the circumstances, common sense dictated that the death and injuries had arisen from the driving of G the second defendant's truck.
