= Kemp v Santam =

South African legal case

Kemp v Santam Insurance Co Ltd and Another is an important case in the South African law of delict. It was heard in the Cape Provincial Division by Diemont J on 5 and 6 November, and 11 to 13 December 1974. Judgment was handed down on 12 February 1975. The plaintiff was represented by LA Rose-Innes, SC, and with him IG Farlam. His attorneys were Silberbauers. The defendant was represented by GD Griessel, and his attorneys were Jan S. de Villiers & Sons. Attorneys for the third party to the case were Truter & Lombard, and they were represented by Edwin A. Kellaway.

The case concerned an action for damages. Diemont J determined that, if part of the mechanism or the equipment or the accessories to a motor vehicle become detached while the vehicle is being driven and cause injury to a third party, the injury "arises out of" the driving of the vehicle, within the meaning of that phrase in section 11(1) of the Motor Vehicle Insurance Act.
