= Minister of Safety and Security v Luiters (SCA) =

South African legal case

Minister of Safety and Security v Luiters is an important case in the South African law of delict. It was heard in the Supreme Court of Appeal (SCA) on March 7, 2006, with judgment delivered on March 17. Mpati DP, Farlam JA, Navsa JA, Cloete JA and Van Heerden JA presided. RT Williams SC appeared for the appellant and HM Raubenheimer SC for the respondent. The appellant's attorneys were the State Attorneys, Cape Town and Bloemfontein. The respondent's attorneys were Smith & De Jongh, Bellville; Milton de la Harpe, Cape Town; and Honey Attorneys, Bloemfontein. The case was an appeal from a decision in the Cape Provincial Division by Thring J. A subsequent application to appeal it further to the Constitutional Court was rejected.

The central issue was the vicarious liability of an employer for the delictual acts of its employee: in particular, the liability of the Minister of Safety and Security for criminal acts committed by police officers while off duty. An off-duty policeman had pursued persons who had attempted to rob him and shot an innocent third party, rendering him tetraplegic. To determine whether or not the Minister was vicariously liable for the damage thus caused, the court used the two-stage test for vicarious liability, asking first whether or not the employee's acts were committed solely for his purposes and, if so, secondly, whether there was a sufficiently close link between the employee's acts and the employer's purposes and business.

The court found that, in pursuing the would-be robbers, the policeman had acted in both his own interests and those of the South African Police Service (SAPS). He had intended to perform police duties. The first question was thus answered in the negative, which made consideration of the second question unnecessary. The Minister, therefore, was found to be vicariously liable to the third party. The policeman's non-adherence either to the rules of criminal procedure or to police standing orders did not excuse the Minister from liability.

== Facts ==
An off-duty policeman, Constable Lionel Siljeur, while pursuing persons who had attempted to rob him, shot the respondent, Allister Roy Luiters, an innocent third party, thereby rendering him a tetraplegic. It appeared from the evidence that, in pursuing the would-be robbers, Siljeur had used his firearm in a manner which was contrary both to the standing orders of the SAPS and to the provisions of the Criminal Procedure Act. The respondent succeeded in an action for damages in the High Court on the basis that, at the time of the incident, Siljeur had been acting within the course and scope of his employment as a member of the SAPS, making the appellant vicariously liable to the respondent.

== Argument ==
It was argued on appeal, on behalf of the appellant, that Siljeur had not been acting within the course and scope of his employment at the time of the incident, and that the appellant therefore escaped liability to the respondent.

== Judgment ==
Navsa JA, for a unanimous SCA, held that, in determining whether or not an employer is vicariously liable for acts committed by an employee in the course of a deviation from the normal performance of his duties, two questions have to be answered:

1. Were the wrongful acts perpetrated solely for the purposes of the employee? This question requires a subjective consideration of the employee's state of mind at the time of the incident and is purely a question of fact.
2. If so, was there nonetheless a sufficiently close link between the employee's acts and the purposes and the business of the employer? This inquiry raises questions of both fact and law.

As to the first question, Navsa JA held that, in pursuing the would-be robbers, Siljeur had acted in both his own interests and the interests of the SAPS. Although he personally had been subjected to an attempted robbery, he must have been mindful of his authority as a policeman in pursuing the robbers, especially given that he was using his service pistol. The court a quo had therefore found correctly, in Navsa JA's view, that Siljeur's intention at the time of the incident had been to perform police duties.

The fact that Siljeur had adhered neither to the police standing orders, nor to the Criminal Procedure Act, in his pursuit of the would-be robbers, did not, the court decided, excuse the appellant from liability. The appeal, therefore, was dismissed and the decision in the Cape Provincial Division, in Luiters v Minister of Safety and Security, confirmed.

== Appeal ==
The Minister duly appealed to the Constitutional Court, which dismissed the application on the basis that there were no prospects of success on appeal.
