= Hitaffer v. Argonne Co. =

1950 United States D.C. Circuit court case

- Court: United States Court of Appeals for the District of Columbia Circuit
- Full case name: Hitaffer v. Argonne Co.
- Argued: January 9, 1950
- Decided: May 29, 1950
- Citations: 183 F.2d 811; 87 U.S. App. D.C. 57; 23 A.L.R. 2d 1366

Case history
- Subsequent history: Certiorari denied October 16, 1950

Court membership
- Judges sitting: Bennett Champ Clark, Wilbur Kingsbury Miller, Charles Fahy

Case opinions
- Majority: Clark, joined by Miller
- Concurrence: Fahy

Keywords
- Loss of consortium

Hitaffer v. Argonne Co., 183 F.2d 811 (D.C. Cir. 1950), was a case decided by the D.C. Circuit that first recognized a wife's right to bring a cause of action for loss of consortium.

The plaintiff's husband had been injured at work, and had received compensation, however his injuries had left the married couple unable to enjoy sexual relations. The wife filed for additional damages on grounds of loss of consortium, but the defendant argued that a wife could not suffer loss of consortium.
