= Helen Scott (legal scholar) =

Jurist and university teacher

Helen Scott was appointed as the Regius Professor of Civil Law at the University of Cambridge, starting in October 2022. She succeeds Professor David Ibbetson, who retired in September 2022.

Scott's academic focus includes Roman Law and the law of obligations, particularly tort and unjust enrichment. She has authored several publications, including "Unjust Enrichment in South African Law" and co-edited multiple works.

Scott holds degrees from the University of Cape Town and the University of Oxford. Before taking up her current role, Scott was a professor of private law at Oxford and Vice-Dean of the Faculty of Law. Before that, she was a professor of private law at the University of Cape Town and head of the Department of Private Law there. She has also taught at the Université Panthéon-Assas (Paris II).

She is the daughter of South African judge Douglas Scott.
