= Kruger v Coetzee =

South African legal case

Kruger v Coetzee is an important case in South African law, in particular in the law of delict and on the question of negligence.

In an action for damages alleged to have been caused by the defendant's negligence, culpa arises, for the purposes of liability, only if a diligens paterfamilias in the position of the defendant not only would have foreseen the reasonable possibility of his conduct injuring another in his person or property and causing him patrimonial loss, but would also have taken reasonable steps to guard against such an occurrence, and if the defendant failed to take such steps.

Whether a diligens paterfamilias in the position of the person concerned would take any guarding steps at all, and, if so, what steps would be reasonable, must always depend upon the particular circumstances of each case.

Where the defendant has foreseen the possibility and taken certain steps, the onus is on the plaintiff to prove that there were further steps which he could and should have taken.

The decision in the Eastern Cape Division, in Coetzee v Kruger, was by this reasoning reversed.

== See also ==
- Delict
- Law of South Africa
- South African law of delict
