= Fourway Haulage SA v SA National Roads Agency =

South African legal case

Fourway Haulage SA (Pty) Ltd v SA National Roads Agency Ltd is an important case in South African law. It was heard in the Supreme Court of Appeal on 5 November 2008, with judgment handed down on 26 November. The judges were Scott JA, Farlam JA, Brand JA, Lewis JA and Jafta JA. JH Dreyer SC (with JA du Plessis) appeared for the appellant, and AC Ferreira SC (with I. Ellis) for the respondent.

The case is especially significant for the law of delict, and the question of wrongfulness in cases of pure economic loss. The court held that the causation of pure economic loss is not prima facie wrongful. Wrongfulness is a function of public and legal policy considerations. The court went on to examine and explain the policy considerations determining liability.

== Facts ==
Following a motor accident, a toll road had to be closed for 24 hours to facilitate the clean-up of spilt asbestos, which caused the toll company to lose revenue for the duration of the clean-up. The toll company instituted action in the High Court, in which it claimed its loss in toll revenue from the haulier which operated the asbestos truck. After a separation of issues, the High Court determined that the haulier was liable in damages to the toll company for its loss. In arriving at that conclusion, the court found

1. that the loss was not a pure economic loss;
2. that the question of a legal duty therefore did not arise; and
3. that the loss was not too remote for it to be considered to have been caused (legally) by the negligent driving of the haulier's employee.

The haulier appealed against those findings, and the decision of the High Court, to the Supreme Court of Appeal.

== Judgment ==
The court held that "pure economic loss" connoted loss that did not arise directly from damage to the plaintiff's person or property, but which arose, rather, in consequence of the negligent act itself, such as loss of profit, additional expenses or diminution in the value of property. Thus understood, the respondent's claim fell squarely within the ambit of "pure economic loss."

The court held further that the principles applicable to the element of wrongfulness were trite. They proceeded from the premise that negligent conduct which manifested itself in the form of a positive act, causing physical damage to the property or person of another, was prima facie wrongful. In contrast, negligent causation of pure economic loss was not regarded as prima facie wrongful. Its wrongfulness depended on the existence of a legal duty. The imposition of that legal duty was a matter for judicial determination, involving criteria of public or legal policy consistent with constitutional norms. In the result, conduct causing pure economic loss would only be regarded as wrongful and therefore actionable if public or legal policy considerations required that such conduct, if negligent, should attract legal liability for the resulting damages.

In a case like the present, where the claim for pure economic loss fell outside the ambit of any recognised category of liability, the first step was to identify the considerations of policy that were of relevance. The first policy consideration was the avoidance of imposing liability in an indeterminate amount for an indeterminate time to an indeterminate class. Following this consideration was the question of whether the imposition of liability would bring in its train a multiplicity of actions. The court would more readily impose liability where, as in the present case, the loss claimed was suffered by a single plaintiff, and was finite in extent, than where it would open the door to a multiplicity of actions.

Also a consideration was whether or not the plaintiff had been in a position to protect himself against the risk by contractual means. The court was more likely to impose liability where the plaintiff was "vulnerable to risk" because he was unable to protect himself against the risk of the particular loss by other means. In the present case, the respondent was "vulnerable" to the risk of the loss that eventuated, because it could not readily protect itself against that risk by concluding a contract with every user of the toll road.

A further policy consideration was whether or not the imposition of liability would place an additional, unwarranted burden on the defendant. In the present case, where the appellant's driver was already under an obligation towards other users of the road to drive with reasonable care, to hold him—and his employer—liable for economic loss resulting from his negligent driving would not foist any additional burden upon him at all.

The court held that, on each of those policy considerations, the appellant ought to be held liable; in other words, the negligence of the appellant's employee was wrongful.

The court held further that the test for determining remoteness of damage (under the rubric of legal causation) was a flexible one. That meant that the existing criteria of foreseeability, directness, etcetera, should not be applied dogmatically, but in a flexible manner, so as to avoid a result which was so unfair or unjust that it was regarded as untenable. Each of the various criteria led to the conclusion that the loss suffered by the respondent was not too remote; furthermore, the conclusion that the appellant should be held liable was not untenable. The appeal was accordingly dismissed.

== See also ==
- Delict
- Law of South Africa
- South African law of delict
