= Durban's Water Wonderland v Botha =

South African legal case

Durban's Water Wonderland (Pty) Ltd v Botha is an important case in South African contract law, especially in the area of exemption clauses. It was heard in the Supreme Court of Appeal on 16 November 1998, with judgment handed down on 27 November 1998. The judges were Van Heerden DCJ, Howie JA, Harms JA, Scott JA and Melunsky AJA. PJ Olsen appeared as counsel for the appellant, and P. Ellis for the respondents.

== Facts ==
A mother and her two-and-a-half-year-old daughter were on a ride at an amusement park when something malfunctioned in the hydraulics, throwing them off the ride. They sued for damages.

Durban's Water Wonderland found its defence in contract, claiming an exemption clause attached to the ticket. This clause was also displayed clearly on the window of the ticket office. As there was no ambiguity in the scope of the exemption, and as Botha saw it, the exemption clause applied.

== See also ==
- Contract
- South African contract law
