= Loss of consortium =

Legal term

Loss of consortium is a term used in the law of torts that refers to the deprivation of the benefits of a family relationship due to injuries caused by a tortfeasor. In this context, the word consortium means "(the right of) association and fellowship between two married people". Damages may be claimed under three theories: incurred medical costs or those yet to be incurred by the plaintiff, the loss of an injured spouse's services, and loss of society (within certain parameters).

The common law rule of consortium has been amended or abolished by statute in many jurisdictions. The availability of loss of consortium differs drastically among common law jurisdictions and does not exist at all in several of them. Damages for loss of consortium are considered separately from, and are not to be confused with compensatory damages.

== Terminology and theory ==
The action was originally expressed in the Latin phrase "per quod servitium et consortium amisit" ("in consequence of which he lost [another person's] servitude and marital services"). The relationship between husband and wife has, historically, been considered worthy of legal protection. The interest being protected under consortium, is that which the head of the household (father or husband) had in the physical integrity of his wife, children, or servants. The undertone of this action is that the husband had an unreciprocated proprietary interest in his wife. The deprivations identified include the economic contributions of the injured spouse to the household, care and affection, and sex. The action was once available to a father against a man who was courting his daughter outside of marriage, on the grounds that the father had lost the consortium of his daughter's household services because she was spending time with her beau.

== In English law ==
Loss of consortium arising from personal injuries was recognized under the English common law. In 1349, the Statute of Labourers 1351 (25 Edw. 3. Stat. 2) made legal provision to prevent servants changing employers, and to prevent prospective employers enticing servants away from other employers. Common law developed on the basis of this statute, such that the law extended from covering servants to covering family members. Since some family relationships were seen as analogous to property relationships (e.g. fathers owned their children and husbands owned their wives), harm done to family members could be seen as deprivation of benefits to the family member with legal control over them. For example, in Baker v Bolton (1808) 1 Camp 493, a man was permitted to recover for his loss of consortium while his wife languished after a carriage accident. However, once she died from her injuries, his right to recover for lost consortium ended (after the enactment of the Fatal Accidents Act 1846 (9 & 10 Vict. c. 93) the English common law continued to prohibit recovery for loss of consortium resulting from the death of a victim). In the 1619 case Guy v. Livesey, it is clear that precedent had been established by that time that a husband's exclusive access to the sexual services of his wife was considered to fall within the concept of 'consortium', and that an adulterer might therefore be sued for depriving a cuckold of exclusive access to the sexual services of his wife. Since adultery could not otherwise be prosecuted in secular courts for most of the period after the twelfth century, loss of consortium became an important basis for prosecution for adultery in English law.

Actions for loss of consortium were abolished in England and Wales and Northern Ireland by the Administration of Justice Act 1982 (UK) s. 2.

== In other jurisdictions ==
=== Australia ===
In an English case, Baker v. Bolton (1808) 1 Camp 493, Lord Ellenborough made a much disputed, and unsupported, statement that an action for loss of consortium will not lie when the act, omission, or negligence in question results in the wife's death. Similarly, a claim for loss of consortium will not lie where the husband and wife's marital bond has been severed by divorce (Parker v Dzundza [1979] Qd R 55).

This action, in its common law form, has been labelled by Australian High Court Justice Murphy as an "archaic view" of interpersonal relationships due to the proprietary and misogynist undertones. In his judgment in Sharman v Evans (1977) 138 CLR 563, he noted that "actions for loss of services correctly treat this [the loss of a woman's capacity to make usual contributions as wife and mother in a household] as economic injury, but as a loss to the husband on the archaic view of the husband as master or owner of his wife".

Actions for the loss of consortium were abolished in New South Wales, Tasmania, Western Australia, and the Australian Capital Territory and by, respectively, the Law Reform (Marital Consortium) Act 1984 (NSW) s 3, the Common law (Miscellaneous Actions) Act 1986 (Tas) s 3, the Law Reform (Miscellaneous Provisions) Act 1941 (WA) s 3, and the Civil Law (Wrongs) Act 2002 (ACT) s 218

=== New Zealand ===
Actions for the loss of consortium were abolished in New Zealand by the Accident Compensation Act 1972 (NZ) s 5(2).

=== United States ===
Loss of consortium has been brought into the law as a cause of action by civil codes, for example, in Maine or into the common law by action of justices. Other jurisdictions view loss of consortium as an element of damages, not as an independent cause of action; in which case the claim must be brought under another tort. As an example, in suits brought under the State of Washington's wrongful death statute, loss of consortium is an element of damages. Although some jurisdictions recognize only spousal consortium (usually considered as sex), others recognize parental consortium (love and affection) and allow children to recover for the death or disability of a parent and vice versa.

Since same-sex marriage became available in the United States, courts in that country have extended loss of consortium to these unions.

== See also ==
- Hitaffer v. Argonne Co.
