= Lesotho Court of Appeal =

Highest court of authority of Lesotho

- Established: 1966 (1978)
- Jurisdiction: Lesotho
- Authorised by: s. 123 Constitution of Lesotho (1993)
- Judge term length: Retirement at 75

President
- Currently: Kananelo Mosito
- Since: 2015

The Lesotho Court of Appeal is the final authority of the judicial system of Lesotho. The Court was established under Chapter X of the 1966 Constitution, however, it was not until the Court of Appeal Act (1978) that the Court was created. The Court can review cases of original jurisdiction from the High Court, but can only review appeals to the High Court if the matter has been granted leave to appeal by the relevant High Court justice.
