= Craig Howie =

South African judge (born 1938)

The Honourable Craig Howie SC

President of the Supreme Court of Appeal of South Africa
- In office 2003–2008
- Preceded by: Joos Hefer (Acting)
- Succeeded by: Lex Mpati

Judge of the Supreme Court of Appeal of South Africa
- In office 1993–2003

Judge of the Cape Provincial Division of the Supreme Court of South Africa
- In office 1985–1993

Judge of the Eastern Cape Division of the Supreme Court of South Africa
- In office 1978–1985

Personal details
- Born: Craig Telfer Howie; 10 September 1938 (age 88) Cape Town, Union of South Africa
- Education: Stellenbosch University
- Profession: Advocate

Craig Telfer Howie (born 10 September 1938) is a South African judge and former President of the Supreme Court of Appeal of South Africa.

== Early life and education ==
Howie was born in Cape Town and attended Diocesan College, where he matriculated in 1956. He received his tertiary education at Stellenbosch University, graduating with a BA degree in 1959 and an LL.B. degree in 1961. Howie worked as a public prosecutor in Cape Town during 1962 and early 1963 and thereafter as state advocate in Grahamstown, until 1964.

== Career ==
Howie started practicing as an advocate at the Eastern Cape Bar in Grahamstown during 1964 and was granted senior counsel status in 1976. In February 1978 he was appointed acting judge in the Eastern Cape Division of the Supreme Court and later that year was appointed a puisne judge for the Eastern Cape Division. During September 1985 he relocated to the Cape Provincial Division. His first acting appointment in the appellate division was in December 1991 and two years later he was permanently appointed judge of the Appeal. In 2003, Howie was appointed President of the Supreme Court of Appeal of South Africa, a position he held until his retirement in 2008.
