= Butters v Mncora =

South African legal case

Butters v Mncora represents a landmark case in South African law, specifically concerning universal partnerships. This case emerged as an appeal against a verdict given by Chetty J in the Eastern Cape High Court, Port Elizabeth. The appeal was heard in the Supreme Court of Appeal by a bench comprising Brand JA, Heher JA, Cachalia JA, Mhlantla JA, and Tshiqi JA on March 8, 2012, with the judgment pronounced on March 28, 2012. Counsel for the appellant included JJ Gauntlett SC and RG Buchanan SC, whereas A. Beyleveld SC and NJ Mullins represented the respondent.

The court found that universal partnerships involving all property, not merely limited to commercial pursuits, were recognized under Roman-Dutch law and continue to be applicable in South African law. The court clarified that in partnerships that transcend commercial activities, both parties' contributions are not necessarily restricted to a profit-generating entity.

Furthermore, the court affirmed that the formation of a universal partnership encompassing all property does not mandate an explicit agreement. Similar to any contract, a tacit agreement, discernible from the parties' actions, could also establish it.

As for the prerequisites of a universal partnership of all property, the court stated that these requirements, applicable to universal partnerships between cohabitees as well, coincide with those proposed by RJ Pothier in A Treatise on the Law of Partnership for general partnerships.

Lastly, in situations where the parties' behavior might suggest multiple interpretations, the court established the criterion for determining the existence of a tacit universal partnership. It affirmed that if it is more plausible that a tacit agreement was formed, a universal partnership may be considered to exist.

== See also ==
- South African law of partnerships and trusts
