= Actio iniuriarum =

The actio iniuriarum is an action for delict which "not only seeks to protect an individual's dignity and reputation but also his or her physical integrity."

== Harm or loss ==
The harm or loss which gives rise to the actio iniuriarum is a violation of a personality interest, usually classified, as per the definition above, under the following three headings:

- corpus, or bodily integrity;
- dignitas, or dignity; and
- fama, or reputation.

== Conduct ==
The delictual conduct required for a successful application of the action comes usually in the form of statements or positive conduct. Rarely is it an omission.

== Causation ==
Causation is normally not an issue in respect of the actio iniuriarum, but it may become one in some instances, as in deprivation-of-liberty cases.

== Wrongfulness ==
Conduct will be wrongful in terms of this action if it is objectively unreasonable and without lawful justification: "Having a valid defence means that the conduct is justified and the behaviour is not wrongful or unlawful."

== Fault ==
There must be fault in the form of intention, although this is controversial, as some in South Africa contend that the action has developed in the last century to include some instances, such as those involving deprivation of liberty, where liability is strict, and others such as defamation involving the media, where liability is negligence-based.

== See also ==
- Delict
- Lex Aquilia
