= Piet Streicher =

South African judge (born 1944)

The Honourable Piet Streicher

Judge of the Supreme Court of Appeal of South Africa
- In office 1997–2010

Judge of the Transvaal Provincial Division of the Supreme Court
- In office 1989–1997

Personal details
- Born: Pieter Emilius Streicher; 19 June 1944 (age 82) Brits, Union of South Africa
- Education: University of Pretoria
- Profession: Attorney, Advocate

Pieter Emilius Streicher (born 19 June 1944) is a South African lawyer and retired Judge of Appeal in the Supreme Court of Appeal. He graduated with an LL.B. (cum laude) from the University of Pretoria in 1969 and was appointed a judge in the Transvaal Provincial Division in 1989.

== Education ==
Streicher matriculated at the Hoërskool Lydenburg in 1961, after which he enrolled at the University of Pretoria and graduated with a Bachelor of Science degree in 1965 before studying law and being awarded a LL.B. (cum laude) from the university in 1969.

== Biography ==
Streicher was admitted as an attorney in 1969 and as an advocate of the Supreme Court in 1972. He served as a member of the Johannesburg Bar Council for two years before being awarded silk in 1986.

A senior judge in the Commercial Court from 1995 to 1996, he was appointed a Judge of the Supreme Court of Appeal in 1997, a position he held until his retirement in 2010. Streicher currently practices as an arbitrator in a number of commercial and construction first instance and appeal arbitrations.
