= S v Mokgethi =

South African legal case

S v Mokgethi en Andere is an important case in South African law, with the court's determination that, in general, a perpetrator's action, which is a sine qua non for the death of the deceased, is too remote from the result to give rise to criminal liability if

1. a failure on the part of the deceased to obtain medical or similar advice, to undergo treatment or to follow instructions as to his treatment is the immediate cause of his death;
2. the wounding was not in itself lethal or was no longer lethal at the relevant time; and
3. such failure was relatively unreasonable: that is, unreasonable also taking into account the characteristics, convictions, etc., of the deceased.

== Facts ==
The appellant had been convicted in a Provincial Division of, inter alia, murder committed during a robbery, and were sentenced to death. The deceased was a bank teller and was shot between the shoulder blades during the robbery by one of the appellants. The deceased did not die immediately but only some six months later.

On appeal, it was contended on behalf of the appellants that, although the shooting of the deceased was a cause of the deceased's death, it was not a legal cause of his death.

According to the evidence, the deceased had become a paraplegic as a result of the shot and had to make use of a wheelchair. His condition improved to such an extent that he later resumed his work at the bank. He was, however, later readmitted to hospital, suffering from serious pressure sores and septicaemia. These had developed because of his failure sufficiently to shift his position in the wheelchair as he had been advised to do by the medical practitioners who treated him.

== Judgment ==
The magistrate in magistrates' court held, on an application of the above principles to the facts of the case, that the wounding of the deceased could not be regarded as a legal cause of the deceased's death for the purposes of a charge of murder. Accordingly, the convictions of murder and the death sentences had to be set aside and replaced with convictions of attempted murder. The appellants were each sentenced to ten years' imprisonment in respect of this count.

== See also ==
- Crime
- Law of South Africa
- South African criminal law
