= Lex Mpati =

South African judge (born 1949)

President of the Supreme Court of Appeal
- In office 15 August 2008 – May 2016
- Appointed by: Thabo Mbeki
- Deputy: Louis Harms; Kenneth Mthiyane; Mahomed Navsa (acting); Mandisa Maya
- Preceded by: Craig Howie
- Succeeded by: Mandisa Maya

Deputy President of the Supreme Court of Appeal
- In office 1 January 2003 – 14 August 2008
- Appointed by: Thabo Mbeki
- President: Craig Howie
- Preceded by: Office created
- Succeeded by: Louis Harms

Judge of the Supreme Court of Appeal
- In office 9 December 2000 – May 2016
- Appointed by: Thabo Mbeki

Judge of the High Court
- In office 1 February 1997 – 8 December 2000
- Appointed by: Nelson Mandela
- Division: Eastern Cape

Chancellor of Rhodes University
- Incumbent
- Assumed office 4 April 2013
- Preceded by: Jakes Gerwel

Personal details
- Born: 5 September 1949 (age 77) Durban, Natal Province, Union of South Africa
- Spouse: Mireille Nontobeko
- Education: Rhodes University

Lex Mpati (born 5 September 1949) is a South African retired judge who was the President of the Supreme Court of Appeal of South Africa from August 2008 to May 2016. He was appointed to the bench in February 1997 as a judge of the Eastern Cape Division and he joined the Supreme Court as a puisne judge in December 2000. Before his elevation to the presidency, he was the Supreme Court's first Deputy President from 2003 to 2008. He was also an acting judge in the Constitutional Court in 2007.

Born in Durban, Mpati grew up in the Eastern Cape, spending his childhood in Fort Beaufort and his adolescence in Grahamstown. He entered legal practice as an attorney in 1985 and was admitted as an advocate in 1989. In 1996, during a three-year stint at the Legal Resources Centre, he was appointed as Senior Counsel. Since 2013, he has been the chancellor of Rhodes University, his alma mater.

== Early life and education ==
Mpati was born on 5 September 1949 in Durban in the former Natal Province. However, during his infancy, his family moved to a farm in Fort Beaufort in the Eastern Cape, the hometown of his maternal grandparents. He attended primary school at St Joseph’s Catholic School in Fort Beaufort, walking five kilometres to school daily and herding cattle in the morning and evenings. Thereafter he was sent to Grahamstown, where, living in Fingo Village, he matriculated at Mary Waters High School in 1967.

Mpati's first job out of high school was as a petrol attendant at Albany Auto Services, a petrol station on Beaufort Street in Grahamstown, where he worked until 1970. During his first year, in December 1968, he was arrested for illegally operating as a taxi driver, having borrowed his grandfather's car to make extra money transporting visitors from the local train station; he successfully defended himself in court, an experience that sparked his interest in law. During the same period, he regularly sat in on hearings in the magistrate's court during his time off work.

Over the next decade, Mpati worked as a furniture salesman and as a bartender at the Settler's Inn Motel. He enrolled at Rhodes University in 1979, aged 30, and he completed a BA in law and Xhosa in 1981 and an LLB in 1983. He attended Rhodes under a special permit required by black students under apartheid, and he was the second black student to complete an LLB at the university.

== Legal career ==
Mpati had begun clerking for a law firm in Grahamstown during his final year of law school, and he stayed with the firm after graduation to complete his articles of clerkship. After he was admitted as an attorney in February 1985, he remained in Grahamstown, working primarily on criminal cases.

In February 1989, Mpati was admitted to the Grahamstown Bar as an advocate. He worked in his own chambers until March 1993, when he took up the post of in-house counsel at the Grahamstown office of the Legal Resources Centre, a prominent human rights law organisation. He took silk in April 1996 and shortly afterwards left the Legal Resources Centre to accept appointment as an acting judge in the Supreme Court of South Africa (soon to become the High Court).

== Eastern Cape Division: 1997–2000 ==
On 1 February 1997, Mpati joined the bench permanently as a judge of the Eastern Cape Division. His tenure in the High Court was brief: he was appointed as an acting judge in the Supreme Court of Appeal on 1 June 1999, and he remained in the appellate court until he was elevated permanently the following year.

== Supreme Court of Appeal: 2000–2016 ==
In October 2000, Mpati was among the candidates whom the Judicial Service Commission shortlisted and interviewed for possible appointment to four judicial vacancies on the Supreme Court bench. Still acting as an appellate judge at that time, he was considered a frontrunner.

After its hearings, the Judicial Service Commission recommended Mpati and three others (Edwin Cameron, Ian Farlam, and Mahomed Navsa) for appointment, and their appointments were confirmed by President Thabo Mbeki at the end of the month. Mpati became the first black judge to sit permanently in the Supreme Court.

=== Deputy presidency and presidency ===
In November 2002, President Mbeki appointed Mpati as Deputy President of the Supreme Court of Appeal; he deputised Judge President Craig Howie, who was appointed at the same time. He took office on 1 January 2003. He was considered a likely candidate to assume the presidency upon Howie's retirement, and, indeed, he succeeded Howie on 15 August 2008.

As Supreme Court President, Mpati was a member of the Judicial Service Commission. In that capacity, he chaired a high-profile 2009 disciplinary inquiry into the conduct of Western Cape Judge President John Hlophe.

=== Constitutional Court ===
Mpati was an acting judge in the Constitutional Court of South Africa from 1 June to 30 November 2007. In 2011, as Sandile Ngcobo approached retirement, he was regarded as a possible candidate for appointment as Chief Justice of South Africa, but Mogoeng Mogoeng was ultimately nominated instead.

== Retirement ==
Mpati retired from the judiciary in May 2016, and Mandisa Maya succeeded him as Supreme Court President shortly thereafter.

In October 2018, President Cyril Ramaphosa appointed Mpati as the chairperson of a commission of inquiry into allegations of impropriety regarding the Public Investment Corporation (best known as the PIC Commission). He led a three-member panel which also included Gill Marcus and Emmanuel Lediga and which opened its hearings in January 2019.

In November 2022, he was appointed to lead an independent investigation into alleged misgovernance at the University of Cape Town during the tenure of vice-chancellor Mamokgethi Phakeng.

== Honours and awards ==
Mpati holds two honorary LLDs, one awarded by Rhodes University in 2004 and the other awarded by Nelson Mandela Metropolitan University in 2011. He was professor extraordinary at the University of the Free State from 2004 to 2008. In April 2013, he was inaugurated as the chancellor of his alma mater, succeeding Jakes Gerwel, who had died in late 2012.

== Personal life ==
In 1973 in Grahamstown, Mpati met and married Mireille Nontobeko, who trained as a teacher and later as a nurse. They have four children, two of whom became lawyers.

A keen rugby player, he was a founding member of the South Eastern Districts Rugby Union and played at centre for the union. He served on committees of the South African Rugby Union and South African Rugby Football Union, as well as on the legal committee of SANZAR.

Asked in 2009 about his race, Mpati joked that he was "'n tussen" (Afrikaans for "an in-between"), explaining, "I grew up in that circumstance when I'm amongst coloured people, they would say I am an African, and when I’m in an African group, they’ll say you’re a coloured."
