= Peet Nienaber =

South African judge (died 2019)

Judge of the Supreme Court of Appeal
- In office 1990–2002
- Appointed by: F. W. de Klerk

Judge of the Supreme Court
- In office 1982–1990
- Division: Natal Provincial

Personal details
- Born: Petrus Millar Nienaber; 1931 or 1932
- Died: January 2019
- Citizenship: South Africa
- Parent: G. S. Nienaber
- Education: Stellenbosch University; Fitzwilliam House, Cambridge

Petrus Millar Nienaber (died January 2019) was a South African jurist and judge who served in the Supreme Court of Appeal from 1990 to 2002. He was appointed to the bench as a judge of the Natal Provincial Division in 1982 and was elevated to the Appellate Division in 1990. After his retirement, he was the Ombudsman for Long-Term Insurance from 2003 to 2007. He was formerly a silk in Pretoria and the head of the private law department of the University of South Africa.

== Early life and education ==
Nienaber was born in 1931 or 1932. He was the son of G. S. Nienaber, a prominent Afrikaans linguist. He attended Stellenbosch University, where he graduated with a BA in law cum laude in 1953 and an LLB cum laude in 1955. He was vice-chairman of the student representative council and played first-team rugby and cricket.

Thereafter he received the Strakosch Scholarship for PhD study at the University of Cambridge, where he was based at Fitzwilliam House and wrote a doctoral dissertation on anticipatory repudiation in English and South African contract law.

== Legal career ==
Upon his return to South Africa in 1959, Nienaber was appointed as a senior lecturer in private law at the University of Pretoria. In 1961, still in his twenties, he was made professor of private law at the University of South Africa in Pretoria, and he ultimately became head of the university's private law department.

He left academia in 1967 to join the Pretoria Bar. He took silk in 1980 and served as chairperson of the Pretoria Bar Council from 1980 to 1982, in which capacity he reportedly supported the admission of black advocates to the bar despite the apartheid context.

== Judicial career ==
In 1982, Nienaber was appointed to the bench as a judge of the Natal Provincial Division of the Supreme Court of South Africa. He was elevated to the Appellate Division on 1 October 1990, alongside Richard Goldstone and Gerald Friedman. He remained in the appellate court after it became the Supreme Court of Appeal in 1997, retiring in 2002 at the age of 70.

== Retirement ==
Shortly after his retirement, in 2003, Nienaber was appointed to succeed retired judge Jan Steyn as the national Ombudsman for Long-Term Insurance. His term ended on 31 May 2007 and he was succeeded by retired judge Brian Galgut. Thereafter Nienaber dedicated his retirement to appointments as an arbitrator and to legal writing, particularly on the subject of insurance law.

== Honours ==
He was professor extraordinary at the University of South Africa and received an honorary doctorate from the Rand Afrikaans University.

== Personal life and death ==
He married Sally Nienaber while sitting as a judge of appeal. He died in January 2019 after a long illness.
