= Delict =

Civil wrong

Delict (from Latin dēlictum, past participle of dēlinquere ‘to be at fault, offend’) is a term in civil and mixed law jurisdictions whose exact meaning varies from jurisdiction to jurisdiction but is always centered on the notion of wrongful conduct.

In Scots and Roman Dutch law, it always refers to a tort, which can be defined as a civil wrong consisting of an intentional or negligent breach of duty of care that inflicts loss or harm and which triggers legal liability for the wrongdoer. Other civil wrongs include breach of contract and breach of trust. Liability is imposed on the basis of moral responsibility, i.e. a duty of care or to act, and fault (culpa) is the main element of liability. The term is similarly used in a handful of other English-speaking jurisdictions which derive their private law from French or Spanish law, such as Louisiana and the Philippines, but tort is the equivalent legal term used in common law jurisdictions and in general discussions of non-contractual liability.

In Spanish law, delito is any breach of criminal law, i.e. a criminal offence. In Italian law, delitto penale is the same concept, but illecito civile extracontrattuale (or delitto civile), like delict in Scots law, is an intentional or negligent act which gives rise to a legal obligation between parties even though there has been no contract between them, akin to common-law tort. German-speaking countries use the word Delikt for crime and unerlaubte Handlung for delict, but Deliktsrecht is a branch of civil law (similar to tort law). In French law, délit penal is a misdemeanor (between contravention ‘petty offence’ and crime ‘felony; major indictable offence’), while délit civil, again, is a tort. Because of this, French law prefers to speak in terms of responsabilité civile (‘civil liability’). In the canon law of the Catholic Church, a delict is a crime.

== Scots law: delict as a willful wrong ==
In the most narrowly construed sense, delict is a Latin word (delictum ‘offence, wrong’) and a legal term, which, in some civil law systems, signifies a willful wrong, similar to the common law concept of tort though differing in many substantive ways. The law of delict in civil law countries is usually a general statute passed by the legislature whereas tort law in common law countries arises from case law. In addition, a delict is defined abstractly in terms of infringement of rights whereas in common law, there are many specific types of torts (English terminology).

Delict deals with the righting of legal wrongs in civil law. In modern times much of the literature on delict, and most case law heard before the courts, deals with issues arising from negligence. Insofar as liability for negligent wrongdoing is concerned, the principle of liability is based on reparation for damnum injuria, or loss caused by wrongful conduct. When considering pursuing such a claim, one must prove, in addition to the existence of some recognised form of loss, that three additional criteria have been met: firstly one must demonstrate that the pursuer was owed a duty of care, secondly one must prove that the defender breached this duty of care and lastly one must show a causal link between the defender's breach of the duty of care and the loss complained of by the pursuer.

In addition to comprising rules pertaining to reparation for loss caused by negligent conduct, discussed above, the Scots law of delict is also concerned with affording remedy in cases which concern non-patrimonial injury, wilful interference with property rights and the commission of nominate delicts (such as, e.g., defamation). The rules for establishing liability in such cases differ from the 'duty of care' analysis discussed above, although the principles of reparation for property damage remain based on the general principle that reparation should be afforded where there has been loss caused by wrongful conduct. The requirements to establish liability for nominate delicts will depend on bespoke rules, while reparation for non-patrimonial injury (e.g., affront caused by intentional wrongdoing) is afforded in line with the principles of the Roman actio injuriarum.

== German-speaking countries ==
By contrast, the civil law of German-speaking countries does not differentiate between delict (Delikt) and quasi-delict (Quasidelikt) as do French and Roman law. Under German Deliktsrecht, or ‘law of delict’, claims for damages can arise from either fault-based liability (Verschuldenshaftung), i.e. with intention (Vorsatz) or through negligence (Fahrlässigkeit), or strict liability (Gefährdungshaftung). Under § 823 BGB, damages can be based on harm inflicted either on an erga omnes right (absolute Rechtgut) such as life, bodily autonomy, health, freedom and ownership, or on the violation of a law protecting a certain legal interest.

However, § 826 BGB (and the similar Austrian § 1295(2) ABGB) compare closely to delict. Under this provision, someone who intentionally inflicts harm on another person contra bonos mores (gegen die gute Sitten) is liable for damages. This widens the scope of delictual liability not just to the infringement of rights (as in French law) but also to pure economic loss (echter/reiner Vermögensschaden).

== South Africa and Sri Lanka ==
South African law and Sri Lanka also use the law of delict as opposed to torts. The South African common law elaborates a set of general principles in terms of which liability for loss is allocated. This should be seen in contrast to the Anglo-American common law approach which has distinct tort actions, each with their own peculiar elements which require satisfaction before an action is founded. The delictual elements that have to be satisfied before a claimant can be successful are:

1. Conduct – which may consist of either a commission (positive action) or an omission (the failure to take required action), though liability for an omission will arise only where there is a duty to act.
2. Unlawfulness – the conduct complained of must be legally reprehensible. This is usually assessed with reference to the legal convictions of the community.
3. Fault – save in limited cases where liability is 'strict' (i.e. where neither intention nor negligence is required for liability) once the wrongfulness of the conduct is established, it is necessary to establish whether the person being sued acted intentionally or negligently, either of which is sufficient for liability to attach.
4. Damage – finally the conduct must have resulted in some form of loss or harm to the claimant in order for them to have a claim. This damage can take the form of patrimonial loss (a reduction in a person's financial position, such as is the case where the claimant incurred medical expenses) or non-patrimonial damages (damages that cannot be related to a person's financial estate, but compensation for something like pain and suffering).
5. Causation – the conduct that the claimant complains of must have caused damage, in this regard both factual causation and legal causation are assessed. The purpose of legal causation is to limit the scope of factual causation, if the consequence of the action is too remote to have been foreseen by an objective, reasonable person the defendant will escape liability.

It is possible that a single set of facts may give rise to both a contractual and a delictual claim. The definition of animus contrahendi states an intention to contract.

Public policy considerations are evident in the setting of the limits to each of the requirements.

== Canon law ==
In the Canon law of the Catholic Church, a delict is the canonical equivalent of a crime. A delict is distinct from a sin, even a mortal sin. One can be culpable for a sin and not legally guilty of a delict. This is especially the case in internal sins, as delicts must be external acts.

== See also ==
- Delictum gravius
- Quasi-delict
