= South African law of delict =

Law of compensation for a civil wrong

The South African law of delict engages primarily with 'the circumstances in which one person can claim compensation from another for harm that has been suffered'. JC Van der Walt and Rob Midgley define a delict 'in general terms [...] as a civil wrong', and more narrowly as 'wrongful and blameworthy conduct which causes harm to a person'. Importantly, however, the civil wrong must be an actionable one, resulting in liability on the part of the wrongdoer or tortfeasor.

The delictual inquiry 'is in fact a loss-allocation exercise, the principles and rules of which are set out in the law of delict'. The classic remedy for a delict is compensation: a claim of damages for the harm caused. If this harm takes the form of patrimonial loss, one uses the Aquilian action; if pain and suffering associated with bodily injury, a separate action arises, similar to the Aquilian action but of Germanic origin; finally, if the harm takes the form of injury to a personality interest (an injuria), the claim is made in terms of the actio injuriarum.

== Sources ==
Delict in Roman law fell under the law of obligations. Roman-Dutch law, based on Roman law, is the strongest influence on South Africa's common law, where delict also falls under the law of obligations. As has been pointed out, however,

In contrast to the casuistic approach of the Roman law of delict, the South African law of delict is based [...] on three pillars: the actio legis Aquiliae, the actio iniuriarum and the action for pain and suffering. Unlike the last-mentioned action which developed in Roman-Dutch law, the first two remedies had already played an important role in Roman law.

== Damages ==
Damages in delict are broadly divided into

- patrimonial damages, including medical costs, loss of income and the cost of repairs, which in turn fall under the heading of special damages;
- non-patrimonial damages, including pain and suffering, disfigurement, loss of amenities and injury to personality, which fall under the heading of general damages; and
- pure economic harm, which is not connected to any physical injury or damage to property.
- obligations arise from three causes namely delict, contract and various other causes, notable unjustified enrichment

== Liability ==
Although delict may be described as at the bottom a system of loss allocation, not every damage or loss will incur liability at law. 'Sound policy', wrote Oliver Wendell Holmes, Jr, 'lets losses lie where they fall, except where a special reason can be shown for interference'. As Christian von Bar puts it, 'The law of delict can only operate as an effective, sensible and fair system of compensation if excessive liability is avoided. It is important to prevent it from becoming a disruptive factor in an economic sense. No law based on rational principles can impose liability on each and every act of carelessness.' There are, for this reason, in-built mechanisms in the South African law of delict to keep liability within reasonable limits. The element of fault, introduced below, is one such. If its conditions are not met, liability will not arise.

== Elements ==
Van der Walt and Midgley list the elements of a delict as follows:

1. harm sustained by the plaintiff;
2. conduct on the part of the defendant which is wrongful;
3. a causal connection between the conduct and the plaintiff's harm; and
4. fault or blameworthiness on the part of the defendant.

The elements of harm and conduct are fact-based inquiries, while causation is part-factual and part-normative, and wrongfulness and fault are entirely normative: that is, value-based, in that they articulate a wider societal policy perspective. Delict is "inherently a flexible set of principles that embody social policy."

=== Harm ===
The harm element is 'the cornerstone of the law of delict, and our fundamental point of departure'. Once the nature of the harm is identified, it is possible to identify the nature of the enquiry and the elements that need to be proven. There is an interplay between the elements of harm and wrongfulness, and a similar interaction between the way in which we determine harm and assess damages. 'For conceptual clarity', suggest the academic authorities, 'it is always important to remember where we are going along the problem-solving route towards the intended destination'.

=== Conduct ===
It is vitally important that the conduct be voluntary. There must be no compulsion, in other words, and it must not be a reflex action. (The person engaging in the conduct must also be compos mentis or in sound mind and of sober senses, not unconscious or intoxicated, for example. He must be accountable for his actions, having the ability to distinguish between right and wrong, and to act accordingly. Unless this standard of accountability is secured, he will not be accountable for his actions or omissions. There will be no fault.) Conduct relates to overt behaviour, so that thoughts, for example, are not delictual. If it is a positive act or commission, it may be either physical or a statement or comment; if an omission—that is, a failure to do or say something—liability arises only in special circumstances. There is no general legal duty to prevent harm.

=== Causation ===
Conduct in the law of delict is usually divided into factual and legal causation. Factual causation is proven by a 'demonstration that the wrongful act was a causa sine qua non of the loss'. This is also known as the 'but-for' test. A successful demonstration, however, 'does not necessarily result in legal liability'. Once factual causation is proved, a second enquiry arises: Is the wrongful act linked sufficiently closely or directly to the loss for legal liability to ensue? Is there legal liability, or is the loss 'too remote'? This is basically a juridical problem. Considerations of policy may play a part in its solution. The courts take a flexible approach based on considerations of reasonableness and fairness and justice, although there are misgivings. As the court put it in Fourway Haulage SA v SA National Roads Agency,

Considerations of fairness and equity must inevitably depend on the view of the individual judge. In considering the appropriate approach to wrongfulness, I said that any yardstick which renders the outcome of a dispute dependent on the idiosyncratic view of individual judges is unacceptable. The same principle must, in my view, apply with reference to remoteness. That is why I believe we should resist the temptation of a response that remoteness depends on what the judge regards as fair, reasonable and just in all the circumstances of that particular case. Though it presents itself as a criterion of general validity, it is, in reality, no criterion at all.

In summary, delictual liability requires a factual causal link between wrongful and culpable conduct, on the one hand, and loss suffered on the other. There must also be legal causation; the loss must not be too remote. To establish legal causation, the courts apply a flexible test based on reasonableness, fairness and justice, or policy and normative considerations. The flexible test, or 'elastic test for legal causation', incorporates subsidiary tests; it does not replace them.

Rigidity, the court held in Smit v Abrahams, is inconsistent with the flexible approach or criterion in South African law, whereby the court considers on the basis of policy considerations whether there is a sufficiently close connection between act and consequence. That question has to be answered on the basis of policy considerations and the limits of reasonableness, fairness and justice. Reasonable foreseeability cannot be regarded as the single decisive criterion for determining liability, but it can indeed be used as a subsidiary test in the application of the flexible criterion. The flexibility criterion is predominant; any attempt to detract from it should be resisted. Comparisons between the facts of the case which has to be resolved and the facts of other cases in which a solution has already been found can obviously be useful and of value, and sometimes decisive, but one should be careful not to attempt to distill fixed or generally applicable rules or principles from the process of comparison. There is only one principle, the court found: To determine whether the plaintiff's damages are too remote from the defendant's act to hold the defendant liable therefor, considerations of policy (reasonableness, fairness and justice) should be applied to the particular facts of the case.

A novus actus interveniens is an independent and extraneous factor or event which is not foreseeable and which actively contributes to the occurrence of harm after the original harm has occurred. This is the case, for example, in International Shipping v Bentley, where there was an auditing error, and in Mafesa v Parity, with a 'crutch mishap'.

The talem qualem rule (or 'thin-skull' or 'egg-skull' rule) provides that, in the words of Smit v Abrahams, 'the wrongdoer takes his victim as he finds him'. An important case here is Smith v Leach Brain.

=== Fault ===
Fault refers to blameworthiness or culpability, while culpa is fault in a broad sense, in that it includes dolus and culpa in the strict sense. Accountability is a prerequisite for fault: The person at fault, to be at fault, must be culpae capax, having the ability to know the difference between right and wrong and to act accordingly. Unless one is in this sense accountable, one is not accountable for one's actions or omissions; one is, in other words, culpa incapax. It is important to remember that there is a distinction between the question of absence of voluntariness of conduct and that of accountability. Voluntary conduct entails no compulsion; the conduct must not have been reflex; the person must have been compos mentis, or of sound mind and sober senses, not unconscious, intoxicated, etc.

Accountability relates to overt behaviour (Thoughts cannot be delictual.) There must be some positive act or commission, either physical or in the form of a statement or comment, or else an omission: a failure to do or say something. Liability only arises in special circumstances: There is no general legal duty to prevent harm. Factors excluding liability include

- youth or emotional and intellectual immaturity;
- mental disease or illness, or emotional distress;
- intoxication; and
- provocation.

There are two main components of intention:

- direction of the will (the manner in which the will is directed):
  - dolus directus;
  - dolus indirectus; and
  - dolus eventualis;
- consciousness of wrongfulness

Animus iniuriandi arises when both requirements—direction of will and knowledge of wrongfulness—are satisfied. The test is subjective. There are exceptions to the requirement of knowledge of wrongfulness, as in the case of deprivation of liberty or wrongful arrest, which results in attenuated animus iniuriandi.

There are several defences which exclude intent:

- mistake;
- jest;
- intoxication;
- provocation; and
- emotional distress.

The test for negligence is one of the objective or reasonable person (bonus paterfamilias). The test requires 'an adequate and consistent level of care on the part of all legal subjects'. It 'does not represent a standard of exceptional skill, giftedness or care but does also not represent a standard of undeveloped skills, recklessness or thoughtlessness'. It is the standard of the ordinary individual who takes reasonable chances and reasonable precautions.

The test has two pillars:

- foreseeability, which refers to
  - the likelihood or degree or extent of risk created by the conduct; and
  - the gravity of possible consequences; and
- preventability, under which heading may fall
  - utility of conduct; and
  - burden.

== Omissions ==
=== Negligent misstatements ===
A negligent misstatement takes the form of conduct or words that mislead a person to act to his or her detriment; if conduct, it may take the form either of omission or of commission.

== Remedies ==
There are, as has already been noted, three main delictual remedies:

- the actio legis Aquiliae, or Aquilian action, which relates to patrimonial loss;
- the actio iniuriarum, which relates to injuries to personality or iniuria; and
- the action for pain and suffering, which relates to pain and suffering and psychiatric injury.

The various delictual actions are not mutually exclusive. It is possible for a person to suffer various forms of harm at the same time, which means that a person may simultaneously claim remedies under more than one action.

=== Aquilian action ===
There are five essential elements for liability in terms of the actio legis Aquiliae:

1. The harm must take the form of patrimonial loss.
2. The conduct must take the form of a positive act or an omission or statement.
3. The conduct must be wrongful: that is to say, objectively unreasonable and without lawful justification.
4. One must be at fault, and one's blameworthiness must take the form of dolus (intention) or culpa (negligence). One must, however, be accountable for one's conduct before one can be blameworthy.
5. There must be causation both factual and legal. For the former, the conduct must have been a sine qua non of the loss; for the latter, the link must not be too tenuous.

==== Harm or loss ====
One obvious prerequisite for liability in terms of the law of delict is that the plaintiff must have suffered harm; in terms of the Aquilian action, that harm must be patrimonial, which traditionally meant monetary loss sustained due to physical damage to a person or property. Now, however, patrimonial loss also includes monetary loss resulting from injury to the nervous system and pure economic loss. A plaintiff may claim compensation both for loss actually incurred and for prospective loss, including, for instance, the loss of earning capacity, future profits, income and future expenses.

==== Conduct ====
Delictual harm is usually caused, if not always directly, by human conduct. The person responsible must have legal capacity, and his conduct ought to be voluntary, much as in criminal law. Delictual conduct includes positive acts and omissions and statements. One of the reasons why the law distinguishes between different forms of conduct is that this affects the way the courts deal with the question of wrongfulness. Courts tend to be stricter when considering whether omissions or statements are wrongful.

===== Wrongfulness or unlawfulness =====
The defendant's conduct must be wrongful or unlawful. (These terms are usually interchangeable.) Whether or not conduct is wrongful is a question of social policy; the court is required to make a value judgment as to its acceptability.

The principle to be applied is one of objective reasonableness. The court inquires into whether or not the defendant's conduct is socially acceptable

- by balancing the interests of the parties;
- by looking at the relationships which exist and the consequences of the defendant's conduct; and
- by considering the results of a decision in favour of either party.

Objectively reasonable conduct accords with the legal convictions or boni mores of the society.

When a court holds that conduct is wrongful, it makes a value judgment that, in certain categories of cases, particular people should be responsible for the harm they cause. This involves a balancing of the interests of the plaintiff, the defendant and of society in general.

In determining whether or not conduct is objectively reasonable, the courts apply certain well-established rules of thumb. These are determined by the nature and consequences of the conduct:

- Conduct is usually wrongful if it causes harm to person or property. In the absence of a defence or any other factor, the harm caused is actionable.
- Where the conduct takes the form of omissions or negligent statements, it is usually not wrongful even if physical harm results. The courts scrutinise such cases very carefully, as special factors need to exist for liability to arise.
- Where harm takes the form of nervous shock, the conduct is again not wrongful unless special reasons exist to warrant liability.
- In all instances the court will consider possible defences. Some of these are aimed at showing that the conduct was not unlawful. Examples include self-defence, necessity, justification, statutory authority and consent.

===== Omissions =====
An omission, as noted previously, is not prima facie wrongful, even when physical damage is caused. The courts' tendency is to be more lenient for omissions than for positive conduct. An omission will be considered wrongful only if there was a duty to act positively to prevent harm to the plaintiff. The existence of a legal duty to act positively depends on the legal (rather than the moral) convictions of the community. The following are examples of how this standard is met:

- where one has control of a potentially dangerous object or animal;
- where one holds public office;
- where there is a contractual assumption of responsibility;
- where there exists a statutory duty (although this is also contingent on its nature); and
- where the harm is foreseeable.

===== Psychiatric injury =====
Nervous or psychiatric injury is sustained through the medium of the eye or the ear without direct physical impact: that means, a mental rather than a physical injury. For patrimonial loss to be actionable in the case of emotional shock, it must have been intentionally or negligently inflicted. The objective-reasonableness test may be satisfied by looking at the foreseeability of such an injury. There are six established principles:

1. Mental harm must arise.
2. It must not have been a trivial emotional experience.
3. If an intention to shock is established, intention limits the ambit of the claim.
4. In the alternative, it must be negligently inflicted.
5. Injury by shock must in either case be foreseeable.
6. The injured party must be foreseeable. There must be some relationship or proximity between him and the injurer, or else some special knowledge on the part of the latter.

==== Defences ====
A distinction should be drawn between defences aimed at the wrongfulness element and defences which serve to exclude fault. Grounds of justification may be described as circumstances which occur typically or regularly in practice, and which indicate conclusively that interference with a person's legally-protected interests is reasonable and therefore lawful. They are practical examples of circumstances justifying a prima fade infringement of a recognised right or interest, according to the fundamental criterion of reasonableness. They are another expression of the legal convictions of the society.

===== Consent =====
Consent to injury, or Volenti non fit injuria, is a full defence; if successful, there is no delict. As a general defence, it can take two forms:

1. consent to a specific harmful act of the defendant; and
2. assumption of the risk of harm connected with the activity of the defendant.

There are five requirements for the defence of consent:

1. capacity;
2. knowledge and appreciation of harm; and
3. consent, or free and voluntary assumption of risk. In addition,
4. the consent must not have been socially undesirable—not seduction, or murder for insurance purposes; and
5. the consent must not have been revoked.

===== Necessity and private defence =====
Necessity is conduct directed at an innocent person as a result of duress or compulsion, or a threat by a third party or an outside force. Private defence (or self-defence) is conduct directed at the person responsible for the duress or compulsion or threat. There is, therefore, an important distinction between the two.

In cases of necessity and private defence, the question is this: Under which circumstances would the legal convictions of the community consider it reasonable to inflict harm to prevent it? The test is objective. It requires a balancing of the parties' and of society's interests. The role of the person against whom the defensive conduct is directed is an important factor in determining whether defence or necessity is being pled. An act of necessity is calculated to avert harm by inflicting it on an innocent person, whereas an act of defence is always directed at a wrongdoer.

A person acts in "private defence," and therefore lawfully, when he uses force to ward off an unlawful attack against his or someone else's property or person. A person acts in "self-defence" when he defends his own body against unlawful attack by someone else. One therefore cannot invoke the justification of self-defence when acting in the interests of another person, but it is possible to invoke the justification of private defence when acting in one's own interests.

Conduct will be justified as an act in private defence or self-defence if it is

- lawful;
- directed against a wrongdoer; and
- for the protection of the actor's or a third party's interest, which is threatened or attacked by the wrongdoer.

The violence used in defence must not exceed what is reasonably necessary to avert the threatened danger:

- The attack must have constituted a real or imminent infringement of the defendant's rights.
- The attack must have been unlawful.
- The defensive conduct must have been directed at the attacker.
- The defence must have been necessary to protect the threatened interests.
- It must have been reasonable: An act of defence is justified only if it was reasonably necessary for the purpose of protecting the threatened or infringed interest.

An act of necessity may be described as lawful conduct directed against an innocent person for the purpose of protecting an interest of the actor or of a third party (including the innocent person) against a dangerous situation, which may have arisen owing to the wrongful conduct of another or the behaviour of an animal, or through natural forces. Two types of emergency situations may be found:

1. those caused by humans; and
2. those caused by natural forces.

==== Fault ====
===== Accountability =====
A person cannot be at fault if he does not have the capacity to be at fault. In other words, one must have the capacity to be held accountable for one's conduct. This involves two questions:

1. whether or not the person has the ability to distinguish between right and wrong (that is, the nature of his insight and understanding); and
2. whether or not the person can act in accordance with that insight and understanding (that is, his self-control and ability to check impulsive conduct).

The enquiry is purely subjective, focusing on the capacity of the specific individual, and is concerned with the mental, not the physical, capacity of a person. A person's capacity may be affected by any number of factors, such as youth, mental illness, intoxication and provocation.

===== Intention =====
Intention (dolus) concerns the actor's state of mind. One will be held responsible for the intentional results of one's conduct even if it is occasioned by an unintended method (although this is subject, of course, to the presence of the other elements of liability). Animus iniuriandi is the intention (animus) to injure (iniuria) someone. It is the same as dolus in criminal law.

The test for intention is subjective. One must

- intend to injure; and
- know that it is wrongful (onregmatigheidsbewussyn). This is also referred to as 'consciousness of wrongfulness'.

Intention should not be confused with malice or motive. One must distinguish between

- how the act was committed (intention); and
- why the act was committed (motive).

===== Defences =====
There are several defences excluding intent:

- Ignorance as to the wrongful character of the conduct, or a mistaken belief in the lawfulness of the conduct, excludes intent on the part of the defendant.
- In an extreme case one may be provoked to a degree of anger which renders one doli et culpae incapax. In other instances, provocation may serve to rebut the presumption of animus iniuriandi or as a ground for justification.
- The defence of jest is directed at the first aspect of intention: viz, that the will was not directed at the attainment of a particular consequence. The sole criterion is whether or not the defendant subjectively and in good faith meant the conduct to be a joke.
- In exceptional circumstances a person may be intoxicated to such an extent that he or she lacks the capacity to be to formulate an intention and therefore to be at fault. If an intoxicated person is found to have had capacity, it is still possible to prove that either of the two aspects of intention is absent.
- The principles applicable to instances of intoxication apply equally to cases involving emotional distress.
- An insane person cannot be held accountable for his or her conduct.

===== Negligence =====
Negligence (culpa) occurs where there is an inadequate standard of behaviour. It reflects the law's disapproval of the defendant's conduct. The conduct is tested against what the reasonable person in the position of the defendant would have foreseen and what he would have done to avoid the consequences. Culpa is partly an objective and partly a subjective concept. The reasonable person is placed in the position of the defendant.

At issue is the law's disapproval of the defendant's conduct, not of his state of mind. To establish negligence, the law sets a standard of conduct (that of the diligens paterfamilias) and then measures the defendant's conduct against it. The test comprises three elements:

1. reasonable foreseeability of harm;
2. reasonable precautions to prevent the occurrence of such foreseeable harm; and
3. failure to take the reasonable precautions.

The standard was well-articulated in Kruger v Coetzee:

For the purposes of liability culpa arises if

a) a diligens paterfamilias in the position of the defendant

i. would foresee the reasonable possibility of his conduct injuring another in his person or property and causing him patrimonial loss;
ii. would take reasonable steps to guard against such occurrence; and

b) the defendant failed to take such steps.

Conduct is therefore negligent if a reasonable person in the same position as the defendant would have foreseen the possibility of harm, and would have taken steps to avoid it, and if the defendant failed to take such steps.

===== Foreseeability =====
The first element of the foreseeability criterion is that the possibility of harm to others must have been reasonably foreseeable: Was there, in other words, a recognisable risk of harm? The concept of reasonable foreseeability is not founded on statistical or mathematical calculations of the extent of the risk, but on a legal evaluation of the risk created in a particular situation. The guidelines for determining reasonable foreseeability were formulated in Lomagundi Sheetmetal and Engineering v Basson:

What a prudent man would or would not do, or would or would not foresee in any particular case, must depend on a very wide variety of circumstances and few cases are ever identical in the relevant circumstances. The sort of circumstances, however, which the Courts often look to in cases such as this in deciding what degree of foreseeability must be proved by the plaintiff before a defendant can be held responsible for the resultant damage are these:

1. how real is the risk of the harm eventuating?
2. if the harm does eventuate, what is the extent of the damage likely to be; and
3. what are the costs or difficulties involved in guarding against the risk?

The magnitude of the risk created by the defendant (point 1. above) comprises two elements:

1. how strong the chance is of harm; and
2. the gravity or seriousness of the possible harmful consequences that are risked.

If the likelihood of harm is relatively great, or the consequences serious, the possibility of harm will normally be reasonably foreseeable. Where the risk of harm is very small, or the harm not really serious, the reasonable person will not foresee the possibility of harm to others.

===== Preventability =====
Once it has been established that a reasonable person would have foreseen the possibility of harm, the question arises of whether or not he would have taken measures to prevent the occurrence of the foreseeable harm. There are four basic considerations in each case which influence the reaction of the reasonable person in such situations:

1. the degree or extent of the risk created by the actor's conduct;
2. the gravity of the possible consequences if the risk of harm materialises;
3. the utility of the actor's conduct; and
4. the burden of eliminating the risk of harm.

If the magnitude of the risk outweighs the utility of the conduct, the reasonable person would take measures to prevent the occurrence of harm. If the actor fails to take such measures, he acts negligently. If the burden of eliminating a risk of harm outweighs the magnitude of the risk, the reasonable person would not take steps to prevent the occurrence of the foreseeable harm. In some instances, the possibility of harm resulting, even if serious, may be so slight that precautions need not be taken at all.

==== Causation ====
Causation has two elements: factual and legal.

===== Factual causation =====
For liability to arise, there must be a causal link between the defendant's conduct and the plaintiff's loss. The Supreme Court of Appeal (SCA) has accepted the conditio sine qua non, or 'but-for' test, as the one to be applied. A relevant question is whether the defendant's wrongful conduct caused, or materially contributed to, the harm sustained by the plaintiff.

===== Legal causation =====
The SCA has consistently stated that the causation element involves a second aspect, legal causation or remoteness of damage, which is not concerned with causation so much as with restricting the causal effect of the defendant's conduct. Various tests for legal causation have been suggested but the Appellate Division has opted for a flexible umbrella criterion, which determines the closeness of the link according to what is fair and reasonable and just. Here are a few relevant questions:

- Is the factual link strong enough?
- Is the harm sufficiently closely connected to the conduct?
- Should the law confirm that the defendant caused the harm, or should liability be limited?

==== Damages ====
The primary object of an award for damages is to compensate the person who has suffered harm. In respect of a claim in terms of the Aquilian action, there is only one function: to restore the plaintiff's patrimony and, as far as possible, to place him in the position he would have occupied in had the delict not been committed. Money is considered an adequate replacement for the lost patrimony. Damages under the Aquilian action do not serve to assuage wounded feelings or to compensate for inconvenience or discomfort or annoyance. (Any element of attachment or affection for a damaged article, for example, is excluded.) Where harm admits of exact monetary quantification, the plaintiff must produce sufficient evidence to make an accurate assessment. A court will not make an arbitrary award in the absence of available evidence. Where damages cannot be computed exactly, a court may exercise its own judgment in the matter, provided it has a factual basis for so doing.

===== Reduction and apportionment of damages =====
Liability for the loss is shared by those who are responsible for it. If the plaintiff's negligent conduct contributes to the loss, that should be considered in determining the extent of the defendant's liability. Contributory negligence is not a defence; it does not extinguish the defendant's liability. It does, however, serve to reduce the damages award.

Similarly, joint wrongdoers are jointly and severally liable for the loss they have caused. A plaintiff may sue one or all of them. Where an award is made against one joint wrongdoer, he may claim a contribution from the other joint wrongdoers according to the extent of their proportionate fault.

=== Action for pain and suffering ===
The Roman-Dutch action for pain and suffering (Afrik aksie weens pyn en lyding), or action for solatium, developed in the 17th century partly from the Aquilian action, partly from the use of reparative fines (or zoengeld, compositie) under Dutch customary law. This action may be raised on five essential heads of liability:

1. Harm or loss: Pain and suffering is intangible harm associated with personal bodily injury to the plaintiff: for example, actual pain, emotional shock, disfigurement, the loss of amenities of life and shortened life expectancy.
2. Conduct: in the form of a positive act, an omission or a statement.
3. Wrongfulness or unlawfulness: conduct which is objectively unreasonable and without lawful justification. If one has a valid defence, one's conduct is justified and one has not behaved wrongfully or unlawfully.
4. Fault: blameworthiness in the form of dolus (intention) or culpa (negligence). One must, however, be accountable for one's conduct before one can be blameworthy.
5. Causation: factual causation and legal causation.

Except for harm, the heads of liability for the action for pain and suffering are exactly the same as for the Aquilian action. The claims are usually embodied in one action, and no distinction is drawn between the Aquilian action and the action for pain and suffering.

For the action to succeed, a claim must be based on physical pain, mental distress, shock, loss of life expectancy, loss of life amenities, inconvenience and discomfort, disability or disfigurement (and the humility and sadness which arise therefrom). The important feature in all of these instances is that the harm must be linked to some bodily injury suffered by the plaintiff. Such loss is non-patrimonial, in that it is intangible and does not impact negatively on the plaintiff's economic or monetary position.

Damages for non-patrimonial loss, or solatium, do not serve a compensatory function, for such loss does not have an economic or pecuniary value. Instead the emphasis is on providing satisfaction or solace to the plaintiff in so far as it is possible for an award of money to do so. The purpose of obtaining solatium is to provide reparation for the wrong; the award does not have a punitive purpose.

=== Actio iniuriarum ===
==== Essential elements of liability ====
For liability under the actio iniuriarum, the general elements of delict must be present, but specific rules have been developed for each element. Causation, for example, is seldom in issue, and is assumed to be present. The elements of liability under the actio iniuriarum are as follows:

- harm, in the form of a violation of a personality interest (one's corpus, dignitas and fama);
- wrongful conduct; and
- intention.

===== Harm =====
Under the actio iniuriarum, harm consists in the infringement of a personality right:

====== Corpus ======
Infringements of a person's corpus include assaults, acts of a sexual or indecent nature, and 'wrongful arrest and detention'.

====== Dignitas ======
Dignitas is a generic term meaning 'worthiness, dignity, self-respect', and comprises related concerns like mental tranquillity and privacy. Because it is such a wide concept, its infringement must be serious. Not every insult is humiliating; one must prove contumelia. This includes insult (iniuria in the narrow sense), adultery, loss of consortium, alienation of affection, breach of promise (but only in a humiliating or degrading manner), violation of chastity and femininity (as in the cases of peeping toms, sexual suggestions in letters, indecent exposure, seduction, wrongful dismissal of an employee in humiliating terms and unwarranted discrimination on grounds of sex, colour or creed).

====== Fama ======
Infringement of fama is the impairment of reputation, better known as defamation.

===== Conduct =====
Conduct usually takes the form of statements, either oral or in writing; nevertheless, other forms of conduct, such as physical contact or gestures, could also arise. The principles are the same as those applicable to the Aquilian action.

===== Fault =====
Fault must be in the form of intention. One cannot be held liable for having negligently insulted or defamed another, or for having negligently invaded another's privacy. The intention element is the same as that discussed under the Aquilian action.

===== Causation =====
As can be seen from the outline of the essential elements of liability under the actio iniuriarum, causation is not an important issue in this kind of case. It is, for present purposes, always assumed.

===== Wrongfulness =====
Again, the wrongfulness element is the same as that under the Aquilian action. The test is one of objective reasonableness. One has to determine whether or not the plaintiff's personality right was infringed in an unlawful way and without justification. The applicable defences are different, however.

==== Defences ====
===== Privileged occasion =====
Privileged occasion is a defence against wrongfulness and is assessed objectively. The following are examples:

- Statements published in the discharge of a duty, the exercise of a right or the furtherance of a legitimate interest. There is no closed list; public policy determines what should be included. Usually the right to give has a corresponding duty, legal or moral or social, to receive the information. If not, there must be a corresponding interest, and the interest must be legitimate. The test is objective and guided by public policy. Malice or improper motive, or the pursuit some illegitimate purpose, will lead to the forfeiture of the defence.
- Statements connected to judicial proceedings.
- Reports of court proceedings, parliament and other public bodies.

===== Truth and the public benefit =====
Falsity is not essential in defamation cases; the truth, indeed, may be defamatory. Truth is only a defence if publication is also for the public benefit.

Only material allegations need be substantially true, except if fraud or crime or dishonesty is alleged. Exaggeration is allowed, but not if calculated to convey the wrong impression.

Some advantage must accrue to the public. Publication of true information about public figures is usually for the public benefit. It is not for the public benefit, however, to publish matter which is only partially true, or to rake up the past: A person can reform. Information on "private people" may also be for the public benefit.

===== Fair comment =====
The general principle is that a defendant is not liable in damages in respect of the publication of defamatory material if it amounts to fair comment on a matter of public interest. The emphasis is on freedom of speech. Fair comment cannot be wrongful. There are, however, certain requirements:

- It must amount to an opinion or comment, not a statement of fact. The assessment of the distinction is objective but not always easy.
- Facts must be substantially true and either stated or well-known. The defendant must have been aware of the facts upon which the comment was based.
- The comment must be fair. The test is whether it was an honest or genuine comment, relevant and without malice. An improper motive forfeits this defence.
- The comment must be in the public interest. Whether or not it meets this standard will depend on the facts of each case. The concept 'in the public interest' is given a wide interpretation, and includes the administration of justice, conduct of public figures, political matters, public bodies and other matters which invite public comment, like sport and plays and books.
- The comment must be based upon facts expressly stated or clearly indicated in the document or speech which contains the defamatory words, or clearly indicated or incorporated by reference. The reference may be by implication, where the facts are well-known, or easily ascertainable.

==== Damages ====
Damages in respect of non-patrimonial loss do not serve a compensatory function, for such loss does not have an economic or pecuniary value. Instead, the emphasis is on providing satisfaction to the plaintiff, in so far as it is possible for an award of money to do so. The purpose of an award under the actio iniuriarum is to provide solace and assuage wounded feelings. The court exercises its own judgment in the matter and strives to determine awards which will be fair to the plaintiff and the defendant, as well as to the public at large, since such awards also serve to guide future awards.

==== Specific examples of iniuria ====
===== Infringement of dignity =====
The requirements, as set out in Delange v Costa, are as follows:

- It must be a wrongful and overt act. The test is again of objective reasonableness: The conduct must be objectively offensive or insulting, such that it would have impaired the dignity of a person of ordinary sensitivities. The question to be answered is whether or not an ordinary, decent, right-thinking person would consider such conduct to be insulting. One must also balance conflicting interests and take account of the provisions of the Constitution.
- There must be intention.
- There must be an actual impairment of dignitas. The plaintiff's subjective feelings must have been violated. This is determined subjectively. The plaintiff need not have been aware of the injuria at the time. (This is the case, for instance, with peeping toms.) The subjective aspect—that is to say, the impairment—may occur later.

If the wrongful act is proved, intention is presumed. The defendant can then try to rebut this presumption. If the defendant fails, the plaintiff must prove the impairment of dignitas. Publication is not required, and the defences are the same as for defamation.

===== Invasion of privacy =====
Invasion of privacy is 'wrongful and intentional interference with another's right to seclusion'. It is the wrongful, intentional and serious disturbance of another's right to enjoy personal peace and privacy and tranquillity. Cases often involve clashes between press freedom and public interest on the one hand, and private personal rights on the other. Privacy can be invaded in various ways:

- Intrusions into private life (by the defendant personally).
- Public disclosures concerning private life (by the defendant to others).
- Disruption of person's peaceful existence.

====== Examples ======
- Uninvited obtaining of information: listening in on private conversations. This includes:
  - Illegally-obtained information: unauthorised blood tests.
- Publication of photographs, which must be offensive or embarrassing.
- Publication of information: breach of doctor/patient confidentiality.

====== Defences ======
- Privileged occasion, consent, bona fide mistake, statutory authorisation.
- Justification (truth and public benefit); that the plaintiff is a public figure (but not if the disclosure concerned private issues); previous publicity habits. This also includes actio legis remorunso (meaning changes).

===== Defamation =====
One's fama, to revise, is one's reputation or good name; it is other peoples' general opinion, the esteem in which one is held by others.

Defamation is the infringement of one's fama: the unlawful and intentional publication of defamatory matter (by words or by conduct) referring to the plaintiff, which causes his reputation to be impaired. No distinction is made between the libellous (written) and the slanderous (spoken) forms of defamation.

The plaintiff must plead five elements and include a prayer for damages: It must be the (a) wrongful and (b) intentional (c) publication (d) of defamatory material (e) which refers to the plaintiff.

The plaintiff must prove the infringement of the personality right. Then the court will presume that the infringement was wrongful and intentional (but it is open to the defendant to prove otherwise: rebutting presumptions of wrongfulness and intention, usually by proving a defence).

The defendant can oppose defamation with a right of opinion, if his opinion is sincere and based on facts (see Freedom of speech in South Africa)

The test is objective: Would the words tend to lower the plaintiff in the estimation of right-thinking people and members of society generally? The mores of the society as a whole are relevant in determining whether or not a statement is defamatory. It is possible, however, to consider the mores of a particular section of the community in some instances.

Examples include

- imputations against moral character, arousing hatred, contempt and ridicule;
- impairments that cause shunning and avoiding; and
- Impairments of professional or business reputation.

The plaintiff must plead and prove that he is the person defamed. This presents no problem if the plaintiff is named or readily identifiable. The test, again, is objective: Would the ordinary reasonable person hearing or reading the statement understand the matter to refer to the plaintiff?

===== Publication =====
The publication of defamatory matter referring to the plaintiff amounts to the invasion of the right. Publication is the element that distinguishes defamation from other injuriae. Someone else must see you in a worse light than before; otherwise your reputation has not been diminished. If publication is not proved, there is no defamation. But an injuria or an infringement of a right of privacy could still be present.

== See also ==
- Law of South Africa
- Law of obligations
- Delict
- Tort
