= R v Shein =

South African legal case

R v Shein is an important case in South African law, heard in the Appellate Division, Bloemfontein, on 15 September 1924, with judgment handed down on 3 October. Innes CJ, Solomon JA, De Villiers JA, Kotz JA and Wessels JA presided. The court found that the evidence on which a jury is entitled to convict upon a criminal charge is evidence on which reasonable men could properly convict. If the evidence produced cannot be so described, the court will set aside the verdict not as deciding the facts itself, but because the jury has not, in its opinion, duly discharged the judicial duty cast upon it. If, on the other hand, the evidence does answer to that description, the court will refuse to interfere, not because it would have come to the same conclusion itself, but because no ground exists for interference with the discharge of a duty entrusted by law to the jury alone.

== Facts ==
A jury had convicted the accused on a charge of arson.

== Judgment ==
The court found that there was evidence before the jury on which reasonable men could properly have convicted, and therefore refused to interfere with the verdict. A person who sets fire to the house of another must be taken to have contemplated and intended injury to the owner of the house, whether such owner is insured or not. The court followed the judgment in R v Kewelram.

== See also ==
- Appeal
- Conviction
- Crime in South Africa
- Intention (criminal law)
- Jury
- Law of South Africa
- Reasonable person
- South African criminal law
