= R v Mataung =

R v Mataung is an important case in South African law, heard and decided in the Orange Free State Provincial Division on 13 August 1953. Brink J wrote the judgment; Van Blerk J concurred.

== Facts ==
The accused had pleaded guilty to and been convicted of arson, in that he had set alight a grass hut.

== Judgment ==
On review, the Orange Free State Provincial Division held that, in the absence of evidence that the hut was of an immovable nature, the conviction and the sentence should be set aside. The court referred to and applied the decision of Innes CJ in R v Mabula, which held that the property affected had to have been immovable property for the definition of arson to be met.

== See also ==
- R v Soqokomashe
- Arson
- Crime in South Africa
- Law of South Africa
