= R v Soqokomashe =

R v Soqokomashe is an important case in South African law, heard in the Eastern Districts Local Division by Price JP and Jennett J on 2 March 1956, with judgment handed down on 9 March.

== Facts ==
The appellants had pleaded guilty to a charge of arson, it being alleged that they had set fire to a rondavel classroom of a "native" school. The Crown evidence showed that the structure was immovable, but that there was no evidence to prove that it had been burned intentionally.

== Judgment ==
In an appeal from convictions in a magistrate's court, the court held that, as long as an accidental burning had not been excluded by the evidence as a reasonable possibility, it could not be said that it had been proved aliunde beyond a reasonable doubt that the crime had been committed. The court held further that the case should not be remitted for further evidence.

== See also ==
- R v Mataung
- Arson
- Crime in South Africa
- Law of South Africa
