= R v Zinn =

South African legal case

R v Zinn, an important case in South African law, was heard in the Appellate Division on 6 December 1945, with judgment handed down on 13 March 1946. Watermeyer CJ, Tindall JA, Greenberg JA, Schreiner JA, and Davis AJA. NE Rosenberg KC (with him D. Gould) appeared for the appellant, and C. Norman Scoble, for the Crown. The court held that an enactment does not create a criminal offence unless it expressly provides for a penalty.

== Facts ==
The appellant had been convicted of a contravention of Volksraad Besluit No. 104 of 25 September 1871, in that he had allowed coloured persons, other than those exempted by the Besluit, to occupy an erf in the village of belonging to the appellant, and had been fined £1. This decision was appealed on the grounds

1. that a breach of the provisions of the Besluit was not a crime; and
2. that the Besluit, in so far as it referred to coloured persons, had been impliedly repealed by subsequent legislation.

== Judgment ==
The Appellate Division, allowing an appeal, did not think it necessary, for the purposes of this case, to attempt to lay down any specific test for deciding whether an enactment creates a criminal offence. It was sufficient, the court found, to apply the general rule of giving effect to the lawgiver's intention. It considered, therefore, whether or not the language of the Besluit, together with its surrounding circumstances, showed that it was a penal enactment. The court began by comparing the Besliut with other legislative enactments preceding and following it, and found none whose terms showed it to be a criminal enactment but which did not expressly mention a penalty: "A survey of the legislation up to and including the period when the Besluit was passed affords good reason for holding that, as a matter of practice, 'when the Volksraad intended to create a crime, it prescribed a penalty.'"

The court held, for this reason and for others, that the Besluit in question did not create a crime. Although it did not make the assumption that, if an enactment is to create a crime, it should provide, either expressly or by reference, for a punishment, "I think it improbable that if the lawgiver had intended that the Besluit should create a crime, he would not have taken the precaution of inserting a penalty—more particularly as this is what appears generally to have been done."

The decision of the Transvaal Provincial Division (where Barry JP and Millin J dismissed an appeal from conviction in the Magistrate's Court of Johannesburg), was thus reversed.

== See also ==
- Crime in South Africa
- South African criminal law
- South African law
