= Neil Watson =

Neil Watson may refer to:

- Neil Watson (basketballer)
- Neil Watson (politician)
- Neil Watson, founder of the website Crime Expo South Africa
