= R v Kewelram =

South African legal case

R v Kewelram is an important case in South African law. It was heard in the Appellate Division, Bloemfontein, on 15 February 1922, with judgment handed down on 6 March. The judges were Innes CJ, Solomon JA, Maasdorp JA, De Villiers JA and Juta JA.

== Facts ==
The appellant was convicted by a jury of arson on an indictment which charged him with setting fire to the store of one "M," with the intent to injure "M" in his property. The appellant was the occupant of the store, and his stock in it was insured against fire. The jury found, upon certain questions put to it by the presiding judge,

- that the appellant set fire to his stock with the object of defrauding the insurance company;
- that the fire damaged the building; and
- that the appellant must have known and realised that that would be the result.

== Judgment ==
Upon certain questions of law reserved, the Appellate Division held that, in order to support the indictment, it was not necessary for the Crown to establish the existence of a specific intention to injure "M" by proof of words or acts directly relating to him, but that such intention could be inferred from the unlawful intent with which the goods had been fired, coupled with the realisation of the fact that the burning of the stock would result in the burning of the building. The court held further that evidence as to the financial position of the accused prior to the fire, and as to his insurance of the stock contained in the store, had been properly admitted.

== See also ==
- Arson
- Crime in South Africa
- Evidence
- Intention (criminal law)
- Law of South Africa
- South African criminal law
