= Blue light bandits =

Police impersonators in South Africa

Blue light bandits, also known as blue light gangs, blue light criminals and blue light hijackers, are criminal groups operating in South Africa who impersonate police officers or other law enforcement officials to commit various crimes. These crimes primarily include robbery, carjacking, kidnapping, raping children and other violent acts, often targeting motorists and sometimes tourists. The descriptions refer to multiple unrelated criminal syndicates employing similar tactics, with significant activity reported in provinces such as Gauteng, Mpumalanga, and increasingly in the Western Cape. The gangs typically use vehicles fitted with unauthorized blue flashing lights to simulate an official police presence and induce victims to stop. This criminal phenomenon has been documented in South Africa since at least 2010.

== Method of operation ==
Blue light bandits employ a consistent modus operandi that generally involves the following tactics in order to impersonate law enforcement officers and exploit motorists. Offenders often wear full or partial police uniforms, including vests marked with the word "POLICE," or clothing resembling official apparel, in order to create an appearance of legitimacy. Civilian vehicles, commonly models such as the Volkswagen Polo, Ford Ranger, or Toyota Hilux pick up trucks (referred to as "bakkies" in South Africa), are illegally fitted with blue flashing lights and, in some cases, sirens, to mimic police or traffic enforcement vehicles.

Using these modified vehicles, the perpetrators initiate fraudulent traffic stops by signaling motorists to pull over. Such incidents frequently occur on highways or isolated roads, where the risk of witnesses is reduced and escape is easier. Once a vehicle has been stopped, assailants, often armed with firearms, approach and exert control over the occupants through intimidation or physical coercion. Victims are typically robbed of money, mobile telephones, bank cards, and other valuables. In many cases, they are kidnapped and forced to withdraw funds from automated teller machines (ATMs) over several hours while their bank cards are used by the offenders.

Violence and intimidation are common features of these attacks. Victims are subjected to assault and threatened with death or other serious harm, including the possibility of sexual assault, in order to secure compliance. Offenders generally operate during evening hours, particularly between 18:00 and 22:00, when visibility is reduced but traffic volumes remain sufficient for targeting. Routes connecting towns and highways with limited public facilities are frequently chosen as vulnerable locations.

In some instances, gangs employ multiple vehicles in coordinated operations. One vehicle may signal the target to stop, while additional vehicles position themselves to block escape routes. Reports also describe side-blocking maneuvers, in which assailants attempt to force vehicles off the road by cutting in from the side rather than approaching from behind. Certain groups have been noted for targeting foreign tourists, who may be unfamiliar with local crime patterns and are perceived as carrying foreign currency or other valuables.

Police investigations have revealed an increasing sophistication in these operations. In addition to modified civilian vehicles, authorities have discovered fully cloned police vehicles and high-quality replica uniforms used to reinforce the impersonation.

== Notable incidents ==
A widely publicized incident occurred on January 6, 2024, involving Canadian musician and businessman Sean Stephens. Stephens, his two teenage children, his mother, and a 12-year-old girl his mother had adopted, were kidnapped in Mbombela, Mpumalanga province. After stopping at a petrol station, their vehicle was pulled over by armed men in a pickup truck using blue flashing lights. The assailants, posing as police officers, assaulted Sean Stephens with a pistol and forced the family into the criminals' vehicle. They were driven to a remote wooded area near a cliff, robbed of their belongings, and forced to provide bank card PINs under threats of death and sexual assault.

The Stephens family was then held in the bed of the pickup truck for approximately three hours while the perpetrators drove to various locations to withdraw money from their bank accounts using the stolen cards. After the accounts were emptied, the family was released in the Masoyi area outside Mbombela. The family reported losses of approximately US$10,000 in cash and belongings. His mother's charity also suffered financial losses due to the robbery.

In November 2024, a mother and her son narrowly escaped a suspected hijacking attempt by a blue light gang in Langeberg Road, Sonstraal Heights. The perpetrators, driving what appeared to be an unmarked vehicle with a blue light on the dashboard, attempted to pull the woman over and cut her off. The driver, suspecting the stop was illegitimate, refused to pull over and drove to a populated shopping center, at which point the pursuing vehicle fled. Local police spokesperson WO Louise Strydom noted that while police were not aware of recent blue light gang activity in the area prior to this incident, the event prompted increased vigilance.

In March 2024, motorist safety advisories were issued following multiple blue light gang attacks on the R23 between Heidelberg and Balfour. According to Delport Securitas reports, the gang primarily operated between 18:00 and 22:00, targeting Toyota and Ford vehicles. A victim traveling from Standerton was ambushed just after the Balfour circle, pulled over believing it was a legitimate police stop, and subsequently dragged into a nearby field where he was restrained while his vehicle was stolen.

During the same period as the Stephens kidnapping, other similar incidents were reported in Mpumalanga:

On January 8, 2024, a Dutch couple was reportedly stopped in Hazyview by suspects in a white double-cab bakkie equipped with flashing blue lights. They were subsequently kidnapped and robbed.

Also on January 8, 2024, four friends traveling between Standerton and Trichardt were stopped by individuals in a white VW Polo displaying blue lights. They were kidnapped, and the assailants withdrew money from their bank accounts.

Two victims provided detailed accounts of Blue Light Gang encounters:

One described attackers in a "white double-decker GT6" with "five guys, three men dressed in police-colored uniform" who assaulted his wife.

Another victim stopped for a "white Toyota double-cab with blue lights" where a man "dressed in full police uniform" asked for his license, then "forced his hand in and unlocked my car. Four other guys jumped into my car."

In June 2021, on the R50 road near Delmas, a motorist driving a Toyota Hilux Double Cab engaged in a shootout with two suspected Blue Light Bandits who were attempting to hijack him. The motorist fatally shot both suspects but succumbed to his own injuries. The suspects were found in possession of police face masks and reflector jackets.

In April 2024, three suspected blue light bandits were killed during a high-speed chase and subsequent shootout with a multidisciplinary police team on the N3 highway near Grootvlei, Mpumalanga. The gang was allegedly responsible for at least six blue light hijackings in the preceding two weeks.

=== Police corruption cases ===
Incidents of police officers being involved in blue light bandit activities have been documented. In March 2025, four suspects, including two serving SAPS officers, were arrested in Gauteng in connection with blue light robberies. eNCA reported that the officers were implicated after being captured on camera during a truck hijacking. The investigation also led to the arrest of two civilian accomplices found in possession of firearms and signal jamming devices.

== Law enforcement response ==
South African authorities, primarily the South African Police Service (SAPS), have undertaken a range of measures to address crimes committed by so-called blue light bandits. Specialized multidisciplinary task forces have been established for this purpose, drawing members from units such as Crime Intelligence, Tactical Response Teams, and Highway Patrol, and in some cases working in collaboration with private security companies.

Arrests and operations have been a central feature of these efforts. In November 2021, three suspects were arrested on the West Rand in connection with blue light crimes. In July 2023, three individuals impersonating police officers were detained in the North West province, where they were found in possession of a Ford Ranger fitted with blue lights. A separate incident in April 2024 on the N3 highway resulted in the deaths of three suspects during a shootout with police. In March 2025, four suspects, including two police officers, were arrested in Gauteng on related chargeswhile later that same month two additional suspects, allegedly linked to more than 30 hijackings on the N3, were apprehended.

Authorities have also issued public awareness advisories designed to reduce victimization. Motorists who suspect that they are being stopped by impostors are advised to acknowledge the signal, for example by activating hazard lights, while reducing speed and proceeding cautiously to a well-lit or public area such as a filling station or police station before stopping. Where possible, drivers are encouraged to contact emergency services, such as the national number 10111, or their private security provider to verify the legitimacy of the stop. Members of the public are also urged to observe and remember identifying details of the suspicious vehicle and its occupants.

Community policing structures have played a role in certain regions. In the Western Cape, for example, Community Police Forums (CPFs) have implemented information-sharing protocols aimed at tracking suspicious vehicles and improving response times in areas experiencing new incidents of blue light crime.

Intelligence-driven operations have also become increasingly important. In April 2021, a joint operation involving SAPS Crime Intelligence, the Tactical Operations Management Section, and private security companies acted on tip-offs from the public to intercept three suspects in Pretoria North after a high-speed pursuit and exchange of gunfire.

Law enforcement agencies have further identified recurring patterns in the types of vehicles used by offenders, with models such as the white Volkswagen Polo, Toyota Hilux, and Ford Ranger frequently reported. This intelligence is employed to flag and verify potentially suspicious vehicles.

Recent breakthroughs include arrests of multiple suspects, including a suspected ringleader. Investigations uncovered cloned police vehicles and replicated police uniforms, demonstrating the sophistication of these operations.

SAPS has indicated that over 300 suspects linked to kidnappings, many involving blue light tactics, were arrested in the two years preceding early 2024.

== Expert analysis ==
Several criminologists and security experts have provided analysis of the blue light gang phenomenon.

Professor Kholofelo Rakubu, Head of Department at Tshwane University of Technology's Department of Law, Safety and Security Management, has described the situation facing motorists as a "catch-22," noting that "there is no law that protects motorists from this crime and it is highly impossible to recognize a bogus or imposter officer from a legitimate officer since they both utilize same tools of trade, uniform and blue lights amongst other."

Anti-crime activist and investigative journalist Yusuf Abramjee has highlighted concerning evidence suggesting some legitimate police officers participate in these crimes stating, "The problem of blue-light gangs on the prowl has continued for some time. We are seeing more and more incidents where fake cops, sometimes even real cops are involved in robberies and hijackings."

Security analysts have raised questions about how criminal gangs obtain police equipment, with some evidence pointing to theft from official sources and potentially corrupt procurement channels. As noted by a 2024 IOL investigation, the question "Where do they even get the blue police lights?" remains incompletely answered despite multiple arrests.

== Broader context ==
The Blue Light Bandit phenomenon is part of the larger issue of high crime rates in South Africa. The country has reported a significant number of kidnappings, with some sources referring to it as having one of the highest rates in Africa (9.57 kidnappings per 100,000 inhabitants as of 2023, according to a Daily Maverick report).

Several factors are considered to contribute to the persistence of these crimes.

The Institute for Security Studies (ISS) has previously highlighted low crime detection rates in South Africa (around 12.5 percent according to one report mentioned by Daily Maverick), suggesting that many perpetrators may evade prosecution.

The documented participation of active police officers in Blue Light Bandit operations severely undermines public trust in law enforcement and complicates efforts to combat these syndicates.

Certain routes have become particularly notorious for Blue Light Bandit activity, including:

- The N3 between Villiers and Heidelberg
- The R23 road between Heidelberg and Balfour
- The R50 road near Delmas
- Major roads in Mpumalanga, particularly around Mbombela and Hazyview.

The blue light gang phenomenon has evolved over more than a decade, with documented cases appearing in South African media since at least 2010. Initial incidents involved primarily robbery, but tactics have evolved to include extended kidnapping, forced ATM withdrawals, and increasingly sophisticated vehicle modifications.

In response to both legitimate concerns about blue light vehicles and criminal impersonation, the Justice Project South Africa (JPSA) and the Road Traffic Management Corporation (RTMC) developed the "Blue Light Protocol," which outlines procedures for both legitimate officers and civilian motorists during traffic stops. The protocol has been criticized by some safety experts as impractical in real-world criminal scenarios.

Adding complexity to the situation, South Africa has also experienced controversy regarding legitimate "Blue Light Brigades" used by VIP protection units and government officials, with some incidents of reckless driving and civilian intimidation by official vehicles. This creates additional confusion for motorists attempting to distinguish between official and criminal blue light vehicles.

== See also ==
- Crime in South Africa
- Kidnapping
- Police impersonation
- South African Police Service
