= R v Mabula =

South African legal case

R v Mabula is an important case in South African law. It was heard in the Appellate Division in Bloemfontein in October 1926. The judges were Innes CJ, De Villiers JA, Kotz JA, Wessels JA and Gardiner AJA.

== Facts ==
The case turned on whether a thatch-roofed structure, used as a dwelling for the accommodation of six or seven persons, and whose walls were built of sods resting directly upon the ground, there being no foundations or other attachment, constituted immovable property.

== Judgment ==
The court held that the structure was indeed immovable property, and so warranted a charge and conviction for arson.

== See also ==
- Arson
- Crime in South Africa
- Law of South Africa
- South African criminal law
- South African property law
