= Crime Expo South Africa =

South African true crime website

Crime Expo South Africa (CESA) was a website that detailed crime in South Africa and encouraged victims to tell their stories. Pages on the site dealt with murder, rape, farm attacks and armed robbery. The stated aim of the site was "to provide foreigners with detailed information and regular updates regarding the issue of safety in South Africa". The site was started on 4 July 2006 purportedly by a Neil Watson, later purportedly joined by Shaun Thompson; although newspaper reports later suggested that both of these may have been noms-de-plume of a gay rights activist, Juan Duval Uys.

On 21 November 2006 the website was suspended due to the failure of the owners to remove what the hosting service deemed to be abusive content. Watson stated that the offending comments were left by hackers as part of a smear campaign to discredit the site, and that the site would be relaunched with a new host by 30 November 2006.

As of October 2008, the website has been discontinued.

== Reaction ==
The site received much criticism for "highlighting negative news and ignoring successes in the fight against crime". In particular, criticism came from the tourism sector for "skewing the truth", as well as the South African Football Association for "counteracting job creation by discouraging tourism and investment" (South Africa hosted the 2010 FIFA World Cup). The Crime Expo site contended that South African tourism agencies were only interested in the money spent by international tourists, not in their safety, and were thus downplaying publicity on the violent crimes committed in the country.

In response to the Crime Expo website, several individuals started opposing sites claiming to provide a more balanced view of crime in the country. The two most prominent ones are Real South Africa (started by Pieter Boshoff), whose stated aim is to "make a positive contribution to the development of the country by following a positive approach", and True Crime Expo (created by Malan Jacobs), which was started "to try and bring some perspective in this debate." Further websites have been developed more recently that enable "public interactivity in the debate".

Boshoff's website has been endorsed by prominent businessman Raymond Ackerman, which led to a call from Watson for people to boycott Ackerman's Pick 'n Pay supermarket and to send e-mail and text messages to the chain.

== Press coverage ==
The website, and the intense debate it sparked, received wide press coverage, being syndicated by Reuters both locally and abroad. Major news stations and papers which covered the story include BBC News, Independent Online and The Independent. The impact and content of the site was also debated in several local and international blogs.

== Accusations of fraud ==
On 14 November 2006 The Citizen published an investigative report alleging that Watson and Shaun Thompson may be the same person, and that they may also be the same person as Juan Duval Uys. Uys is a gay rights activist and leader of the Gay and Lesbian Alliance. Watson has denied being Uys, stating that Uys was a volunteer at CESA and was involved in its establishment. The Citizen further reported that although the website had been accepting donations for some time, no Section 21 company (referring to a South African non-profit organisation) had been registered in its name. Simon Grindrod, the Cape Town leader of the Independent Democrats, laid a charge of fraud against Watson, calling on him to "explain what he has done with the money".

== Formation of political party ==
According to the website, the leaders of the organisation were in the process of filing an application at the Independent Electoral Commission in Pretoria to register as a political party. The party would be registered as Crime Expo South Africa, abbreviated CESA. In early November 2006, the IEC reported that a man claiming to be Mr. Watson had enquired about forming a political party, but had not actually begun the process.

In August 2008, the National Party South Africa party was registered with the Independent Electoral Commission as a new incarnation of the defunct New National Party. Juan-Duval Uys was listed as the party's organiser.
