= Ngcobo Police Killings =

2018 South African spree killing

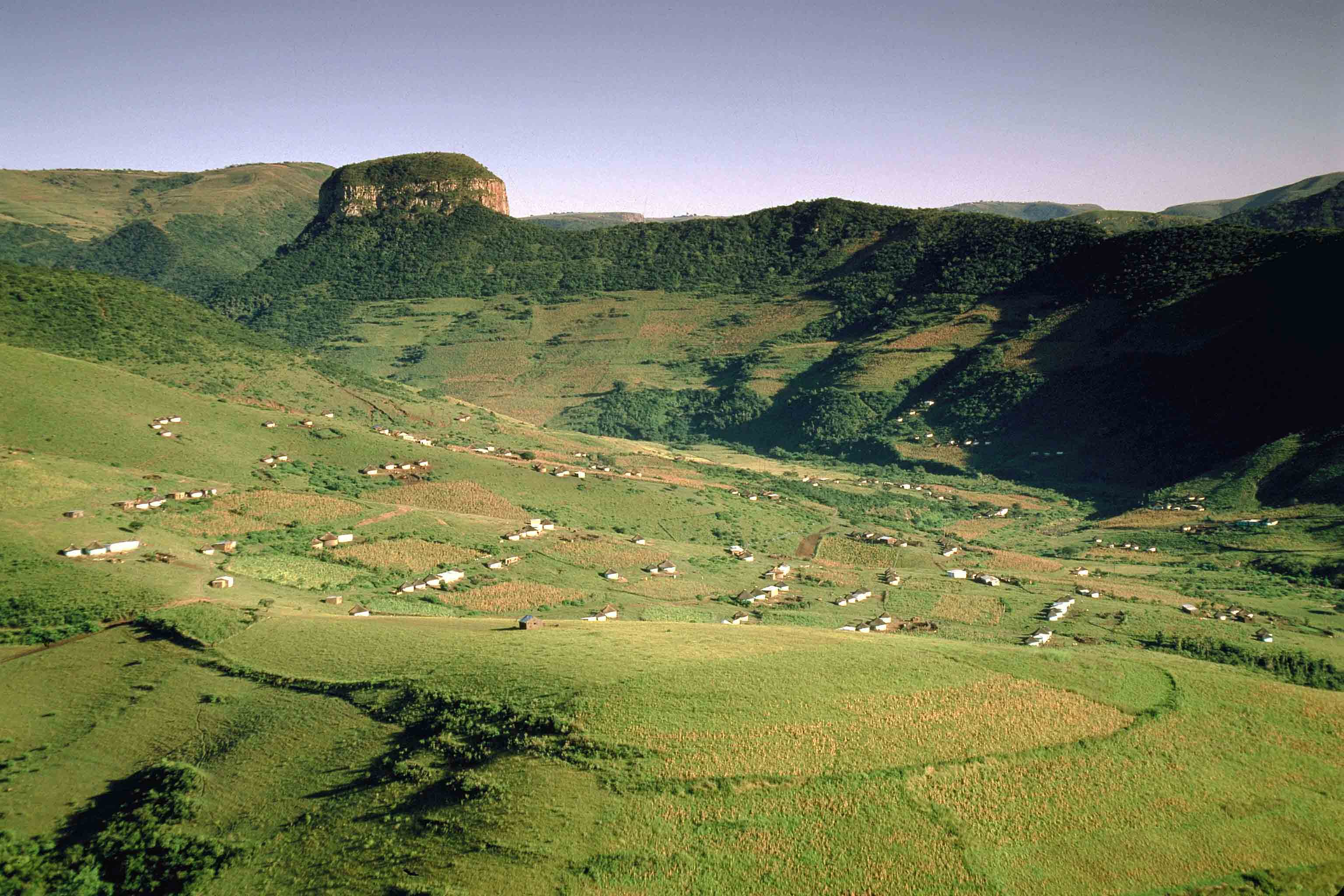
Mthatha - South Africa

The Ngcobo Police Killings took place on 21 February 2018; five police officers and an off-duty soldier were shot and killed by gunmen, who stormed into a police station in the small town of Ngcobo, in the Eastern Cape, South Africa. Three days later, police authorities traced the suspects to a local church called the Seven Angels Ministry, a compound the local authorities soon learned doubled as an isolationist cult that encouraged underage girls to have sex with the church leaders as a tribute to God. The police raid resulted in a shootout, killing seven people within the compound, some of whom the police believed to have orchestrated the shooting at the local precinct three days earlier.

== Seven Angels Ministry ==
The church was established in 1986 by Siphiwo Mancoba in Umzimkhulu, Kwazulu Natal. It was initially called Angel Ministry, an acronym for All Nations God's Evangelical Lamp Ministry. Mancoba recorded most of his teachings, distributing them among his subordinates. They were then tasked with spreading his "word" from village to village, thus creating a recruitment system which encouraged people to come to him for salvation.

Shortly after his death in April 2015, his seven sons refused to succeed him as leaders of his church, choosing instead to breakaway and form Seven Angels Ministry, which would be led by their mother. The church was for the most part closed off to the general public. Education and paid work outside of the church were believed to be doctrines of devil worship. Members of the ministry were required to relinquish all of their cars, money and properties as gifts to the "Angel Brothers" if they wish to join the congregation.

== Police killings ==
It is believed that the church was experiencing financial strain, as they struggled to house and feed the many congregants that lived within the church's compound. Police believed this was the prime motivator for the events that occurred on 21 February. Unknown attackers at the time walked into the Ngcobo Police Station and opened fire. Three police officers were killed instantly, with an off-duty soldier shot dead. The gunmen had earlier killed two additional police officers at a location 60 km from the police station. The attackers took off with a police van and ten firearms, weapons that were used to rob a Capitec Bank ATM not far from the police station.

== Police response ==
On 23 February 2018 the SAPS accompanied the Hawks and the National Intervention Unit and Tactical Response. They infiltrated the Seven Angels Ministry compound after receiving a tip-off about the whereabouts of the firearms used in the Ngcobo Police Shooting. A shootout between police officials and the suspects left seven people within the compound dead, three of whom were Mancoba brothers. More than ten arrests were made that day, with four of the suspects being directly linked to the shootout that occurred days earlier at the police station. Young girls and women were rescued from the compound.

== Sex cult ==
In the days following the arrests made at Seven Angels Ministry, more than 40 women and young girls whom authorities believed were sex slaves for the Mancoba brothers were taken in for questioning. A majority of the women rescued from the compound were under the age of 25, with some being as young as 12 years old. Children were also not allowed to have birth certificates. Despite all of them being married, the Mancoba brothers considered the many other women in the compound as their wives too; satisfying the brothers sexually was seen as a service to God. The majority of the women who were questioned about the cult were not forthcoming with information to authorities; and even after the shootout with police officials, they demanded to return to Seven Angels.

== Commission of Inquiry ==
The Seven Angels Ministry had already been under investigation since 2016 by the Commission for Promotion and Protection of the Rights of Cultural, Religious and Linguistic Communities (CRL), for breach of ethics. Currently in South Africa, there is no legislation to self-regulate newly formed religious bodies. Appearing before the commission in 2016, Banele Mancoba, the leader of the church, explained their purpose as a being of divine intervention on earthly matters; it consisted of seven representatives. While the investigation into Seven Angels Ministry was private at the time, the chairperson of the CRL, Thoko Mkhwanazi-Xaluva, did forward recommendations to a parliamentary portfolio committee to expedite actions against the Mancoba brothers, but they were rejected. The portfolio committee made its own recommendations to the CRL, that it should convene a national consultative conference to engage all religious bodies. The parliamentary portfolio committee sent these recommendations on the same day the Ngcobo killings took place.

== See also ==
- Charismatic Christianity
- South African Police Service
