= Crime in South Africa =

- Homicide: 35.50 (2026)
- Assault: 298.79 (2026)
- Kidnapping: 9.5 (2017)
- Robbery: 183.34 (2026)
- Rape: 63.86 (2026)
- Sexual assault: 11.85 (2026)
- reported annually per 100,000 inhabitants

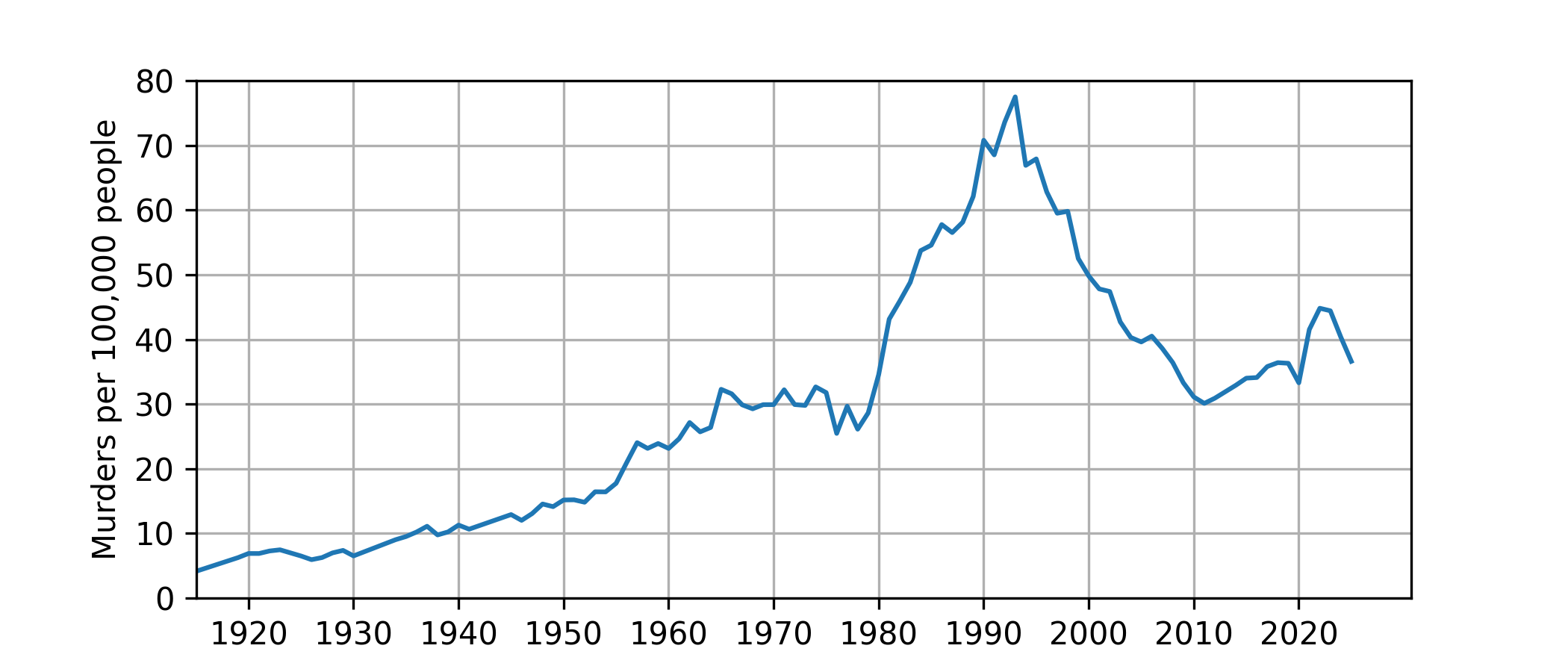
A graph of South Africa's murder rate (annual murders per 100,000 people) spanning the century from 1915 to 2023. The murder rate increased rapidly towards the end of apartheid, reaching a peak in 1993. It then decreased until bottoming out at 30 per 100,000 in 2011, but steadily increased again to 44 per 100,000 in 2023 after a brief drop in 2020. More than 500,000 people were murdered in South Africa between 1994 and 2018

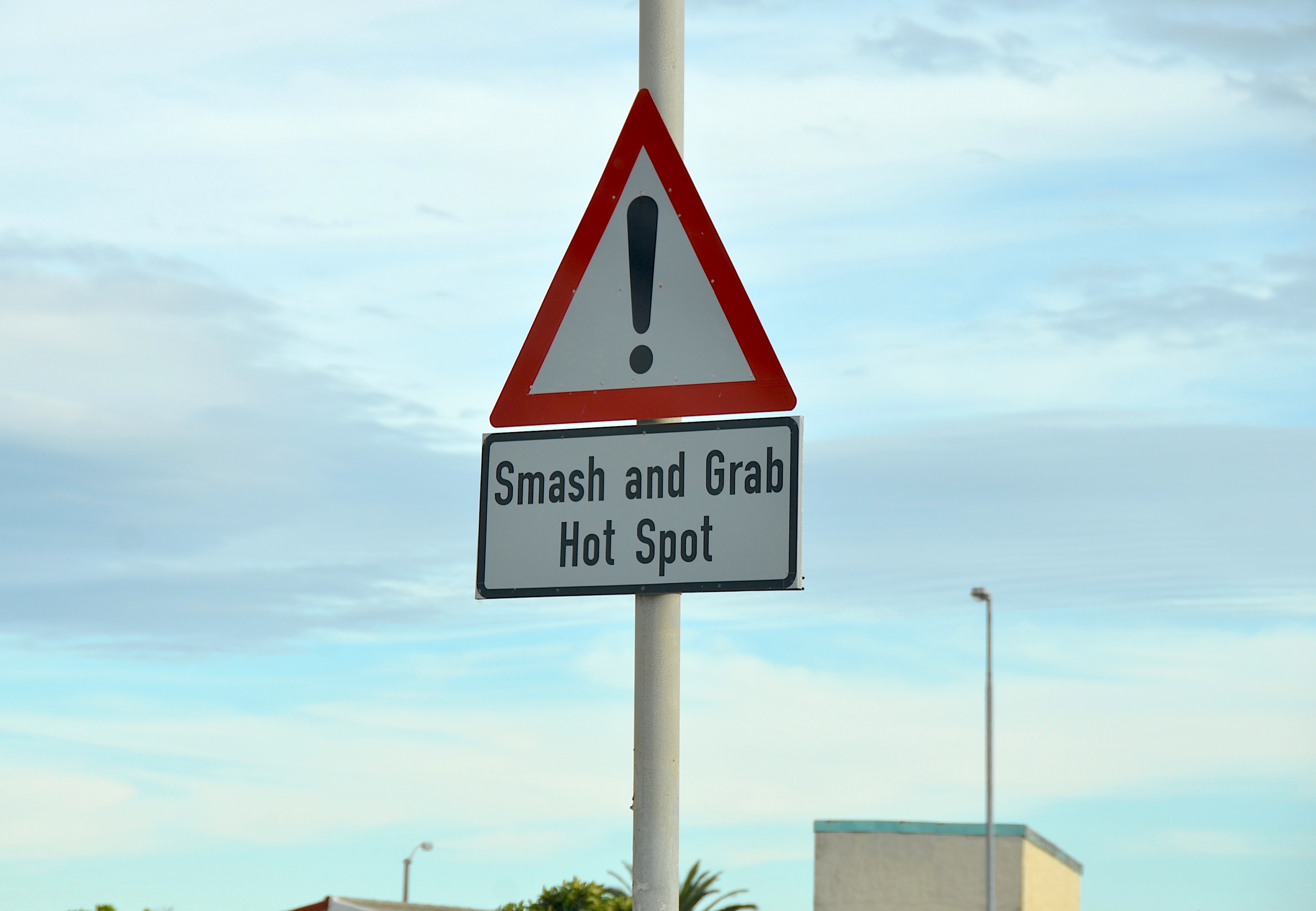
Smash and grab incidents are prevalent on South African roads.

Crime in South Africa includes all violent and non-violent crimes that take place in the country of South Africa, or otherwise within its jurisdiction. When compared to other countries, South Africa has notably high rates of violent crime and has a reputation for consistently having one of the highest murder rates in the world. The country also experiences high rates of organised crime relative to other countries.

The majority of crime in South Africa occurs in its four most populous provinces; the Eastern Cape, Gauteng, KwaZulu-Natal, and the Western Cape—more specifically, in and around major metropolitan areas within those provinces.

While some major cities experience similar crime throughout their suburbs, crime in others is mainly isolated to specific neighborhoods. Johannesburg, for example, experiences a range of crimes across the metropolitan area, driven by many various factors, including poverty. In contrast, crime in Cape Town occurs mainly in a small list of specific suburbs, and is driven predominantly by gangsterism.

Crime rates in South Africa's cities may be skewed significantly by the type and location of those crimes. Furthermore, for the average resident and visitor, the experience in terms of safety when traveling around a major city in South Africa is likely to vary greatly between cities.

In the Crime Index 2026 ranking, the five worst-ranking cities for crime in South Africa, with their respective global ranks on the list, were Pietermaritzburg (1), Pretoria (2), Johannesburg (5), Durban (6), and Gqeberha (8). Numbeo's Crime Index reflects perceptions of crime and safety reported by visitors to its website, rather than police-recorded crime rates.

== Causes ==
Crime levels have been attributed to poverty, problems with delivery of public services, and wealth disparity. The Institute for Security Studies also highlighted factors beyond poverty and inequality, particularly social stress from uncaring environments in early childhood and subsequent lack of guardianship. South Africa's high crime rates, recidivism and overburdened criminal justice system have been described as a crisis which will require a radical rethink of crime and punishment in young people.

In February 2007, the Centre for the Study of Violence and Reconciliation was contracted by the South African government to carry out a study on the nature of crime in South Africa. The study pointed out different factors which contributed to high levels of violence. Violent and non-violent crimes in South Africa have been ascribed to:

- The normalisation of violence. Violence is seen by many as a necessary and justified way of resolving conflict, and some men believe that coercive sexual behaviour towards women is legitimate.
- A subculture of violence and criminality, ranging from individual criminals who rape or rob, to informal groups or more formalised gangs. Those involved in the subculture are engaged in criminal careers and commonly use firearms, with the exception of Cape Town, where knife violence is more prevalent. Credibility within this subculture is related to the readiness to resort to extreme violence.
- The vulnerability of young people due to inadequate child-rearing, followed by poor guardianship and youth socialisation. Due to poverty and deprivation, unstable living arrangements and inconsistent parenting, some South African children are exposed to risk factors which increase their chances of becoming involved in criminality and violence.
- High levels of inequality, poverty, unemployment, social exclusion and marginalisation.
- The consumption and abuse of alcohol is a demonstrable cause or contributing factor in many violent crimes including murder, attempted murder, assault, gender-based assault and rape cases. These incidents regularly occur in or directly outside bars, taverns, shebeens or nightclubs. In addition many South Africans, including on-duty policemen, are arrested for drinking and driving, a crime which is linked to 27% of fatal road accidents.
- In traditional African culture, cattle theft from rival tribes served an important social and cultural function within chiefdoms, and was considered a rite of passage for young warriors.
- Tax profitability of crimes such as smuggling, tender fraud and state capture, besides tax evasion and VAT fraud itself, due to the alleged inefficiency and lack of procedural measures at SARS, the priorities of which are geared towards cooperative and law-abiding citizens.

=== Law enforcement ===
The country relies on a criminal justice system that is mired in many issues, including inefficiency, corruption and internal polarisation.

==== Organization and finances ====
In 2020 the Institute for Security Studies pointed out that the SAPS proceeded from crisis to crisis, had not implemented the proposals for effective policing outlined in the National Development Plan of 2012, and had inept and unskilled personnel in top posts. Following 2019's gang violence and 2021's unrest it was pointed out that the military is increasingly deployed to assist with policing tasks for which it is poorly suited or equipped, while the manifestly dysfunctional policing infrastructure is not attended to.

The SAPS announced a streamlining of its organizational and top structure in 2020, following major restructuring in 2016. The SAPS got qualified audits for the years 2016/17 through 2019/20, as audit requirements for purchases, contracts, prevention of irregular expenses and quality of financial statements were not upheld.

Irregular expenditure amounted to R33 million in 2017/18, R996 million in 2018/19 and R452 million in 2019/20, excluding fruitless and wasteful expenditure and expenses incurred due to civil actions against it, which in 2019/20 amounted to R522 million.

==== Police stations ====
Some police stations are distant from the communities they serve, while others become overburdened in precincts that experience rapid urbanization. Some stations are closed at night due to staffing issues and lack of available officers. In many instances police officers work long hours out of under-resourced stations which may lack basic office equipment like a photocopier or a fax machine, while the only landline telephone may be busy. Office electricity may be cut for non-payment, or office buildings may be closed due to rent defaults.

SAPS officers are often deployed in life-threatening situations, and the Ngcobo killings of 2018 highlighted security at police stations. After additional attacks on police stations in the Western Cape, Northern Cape, Limpopo, Mpumalanga and North West, SAPU suggested that these crimes be considered acts of treason.

==== Logistics ====
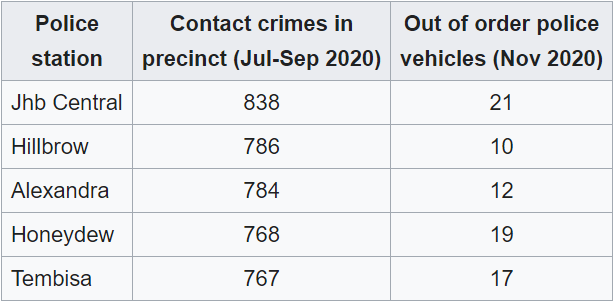
Police vehicles awaiting repairs at selected police stations in Gauteng – the top 5 in terms of reported contact crimes in their precincts. By April 2021 almost 27% of Gauteng's fleet was awaiting repairs which only commenced after 3 months due to the backlog. By February 2022 there were 1,169 out-of-service police vehicles in Gauteng, not counting those stolen from stations, which affected visible policing, detective services and support.

Of 5,781 police vehicles in Gauteng, 1,407 or almost a quarter were out of order in 2020, which negatively affected reaction times and visible policing. Three to four detectives rely on a single vehicle, meaning that detectives have to share with a colleague to visit a crime scene. Poor quality infrastructure prevented the conversion of paper dockets to an e-docket system, while its PCEM, FPS and VA-AMIS systems, acquired from FDA to keep tabs on case evidence and firearms, functioned only intermittently from 2018 to 2021.

From 2018 to 2020, funds were insufficient to supply service members with new uniforms, though some were found in the possession of blue light bandits and other armed robbers. Bulletproof vests were likewise in short supply. By 2020 some toxicological reports of the SAPS were lagging by as much as a decade, while the number of unprocessed DNA samples at the National Forensic Science Laboratories (NFSL) reached a backlog of 117,000 due to mismanagement of the supply chain process.

==== Ordnance management ====
Ordnance is regularly stolen from the security forces or security firms, and it is feared that these may be used in other crimes. The July 2019 UNODC report highlighted a surge in the availability of illegal firearms, including hundreds which are diverted from SAPS custody by corrupt officials, particularly to gangs.

From 2010 to 2015, two SAPS colonels sold 5,000 police firearms worth R9 million to gangs in the Western Cape, and in 2022 two members of the JMPD were arrested for allegedly supplying criminals with R5 ammunition. Firearms stolen from, or lost by, the SANDF during the period 2017–2020 included 57 R4 or R5 rifles, 10 Z88 pistols, five Beretta pistols, four Star pistols, a pair of SIG Sauer pistols, and one Glock and Vector handgun each. Ammunition stolen from, or lost by, the SANDF during the same period were 7,618 rounds of 5.56mm ammunition, 340 rounds of 5.45mm and 7.62mm ammunition for light machine guns (LMGs) and assault rifles, besides some 9mm and 12.7mm ammunition, a stun grenade and smoke grenade.

As of 2021, the fire arms register was dysfunctional, and the SAPS did not know to which officers arms were issued. Fire arms licensing, licensing renewals and amnesty applications are subject to red tape, inefficiency and backlogs until envisaged online procedures replace the CFR.

==== Operational inefficiency ====
When suspects are apprehended, the police lack experience to prepare a thorough prima facie case, leaving the National Prosecuting Authority (NPA) powerless to institute legal proceedings. This results in very low conviction rates of serious crimes. Only 2% of vehicle hijackings, 2% of robberies of either residential or commercial premises, 9% of sexual offences (5% of adult rape and 9% of child rape cases) result in convictions.

As of 2020 less than 20% of murder investigations would result in a trial date being set, down from 31% in 2010/11. Cooperation between the SAPS and private prosecution initiatives have been effective in stalled cases.

==== Human resource management ====
While South Africa had one police officer to 250 members of the public in 2010, this ratio decreased to one to 450 in 2022. The force dedicated to rail network policing was reduced by about 6,000 between 1986 and 2010, which exposed the network to train arson attacks and widespread looting of infrastructure. Mass recruitment of unskilled applicants occurs, and some of these are trained at substandard facilities.

In what is seen as a culture of non-liability, very few police personnel are being expelled from the service. Instead disciplinary hearings have declined greatly in frequency, skilled recruits are not sensibly deployed, and from 2018 to 2019, 22% of officers received promotions without regard to their performance.

The SAPS's very understaffed Crime Intelligence Division was at times effective, but also subject to enduring power struggles during which effective members were sidelined. Effective control of explosives used in various crimes is only achieved by joint investigation task teams that engage in collaborative operations. The SAPS's capacity and resource constraints however, besides a lack of intelligence sharing with border control officials and poor internal, inter-departmental collaboration, hamper their execution of operations in this specialized area.

Budget cuts in training and explosive consumables for detectives and prosecutors fundamentally constrain the SAPS's operating ability, and as of 2018–2021, SAPS staff was not receiving any refresher courses. Some economic crimes go undetected, while the imposed penalties amount to little deterrence. Meaningful enforcement would require specialist detectives in dedicated investigative departments. From 2020 to 2023, 10111 emergency response centres of all provinces were severely understaffed, resulting in millions of calls being dropped annually.

==== Corruption ====
A 2019 survey by Global Corruption Barometer Africa suggested that the SAPS is seen as the most corrupt institution in the country. In 2020, Andrew Whitfield of the DA described the SAPS as "rotten to the core", and proposed the establishment of a parliamentary ad hoc committee to investigate SAPS corruption. Many SAPS officers accept bribes from the criminal underworld, especially when their superiors and seniors are visibly on the take.

Officers of various ranks have been implicated in forms of corruption which involves fraud, blackmail, assisting the escape of prisoners, or the irregular awarding of contracts. As of 2020, 286 corruption cases involving 564 police officers were pending.

The Criminal Justice Budget was subject to plunder by corrupt police officials at least during the period from 1997 to 2017. The massive inside job involved over 20 persons in the SAPS's top brass, and probes into these activities necessitated the discontinuation of some essential policing services.

Contraventions of the Disaster Management Act, and over R1 billion of allegedly irregular transfers of COVID-19 relief funds have been tied to SAPS officials, while others were dismissed (but not convicted) for alleged corrupt branding and outsourcing practices involving the police vehicle fleet.

==== Implementation of technology ====
Implementation of drone technology in urban centers and informal settlements is seen as an effective and cost-saving crime-fighting tool. The City of Cape Town was first to invest in it, but licensing applications submitted to SACAA may take up to two years to be processed. From 2016 to 2019 Cape Town invested millions in ShotSpotter, a technology which allowed authorities to pinpoint the source of gunfire. Its implementation did not result in a reduction in murders, and its use was discontinued.

== Violent crime ==
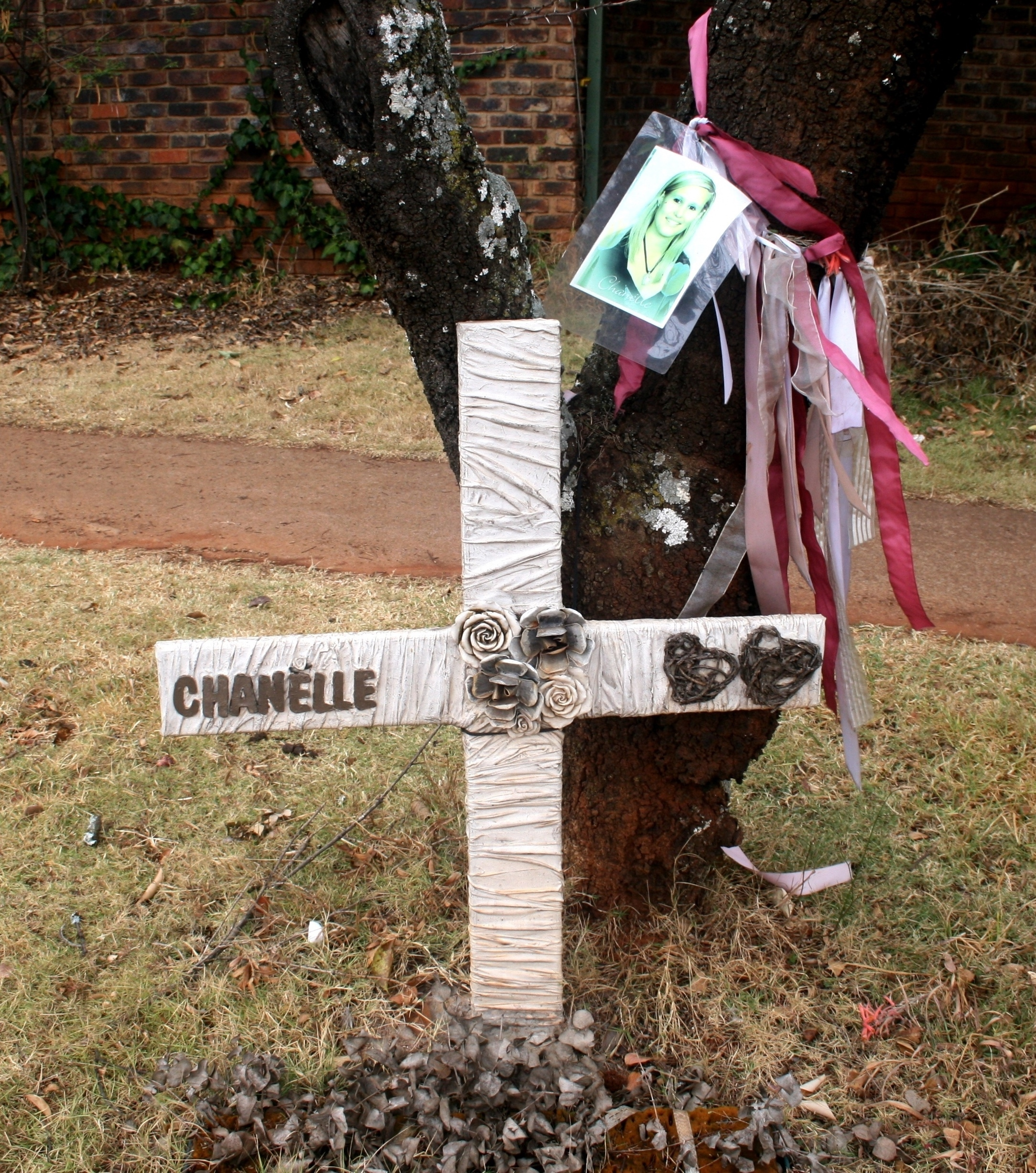
Roadside memorial to a 2011 drive-by shooting victim in Pretoria in 2021.

South Africa has exceptionally high rates of murder, gender-based violence, robbery and violent conflict. A survey for the period 1990–2000 compiled by the United Nations Office on Drugs and Crime ranked South Africa second for assault and murder (by all means) per capita and first for rapes per capita in a data set of 60 countries.

Total crime per capita was 10th out of the 60 countries in the dataset. The United Nations Interregional Crime and Justice Research Institute have conducted research on the victims of crime which shows the picture of South African crime as more typical of a developing country.

According to SAPS and SSA statistics, the rate of increase in violent crimes committed in South Africa (2016–2020) was slowing down, but up to 2019/20, the incidence of this crime category was usually growing year on year. In April 2022, Numbeo found that 5 of the top 20 most dangerous cities in the world were in South Africa.

In 2023, the IEP's Global Peace Index ranked South Africa 130th out of 163 nations (32nd out of 44 in sub-Saharan Africa) in terms of peacefulness, and the cost of violence was estimated at R3.30 trillion ($176.49 billion) in 2022, or 15% of the country's GDP.

=== Murder ===
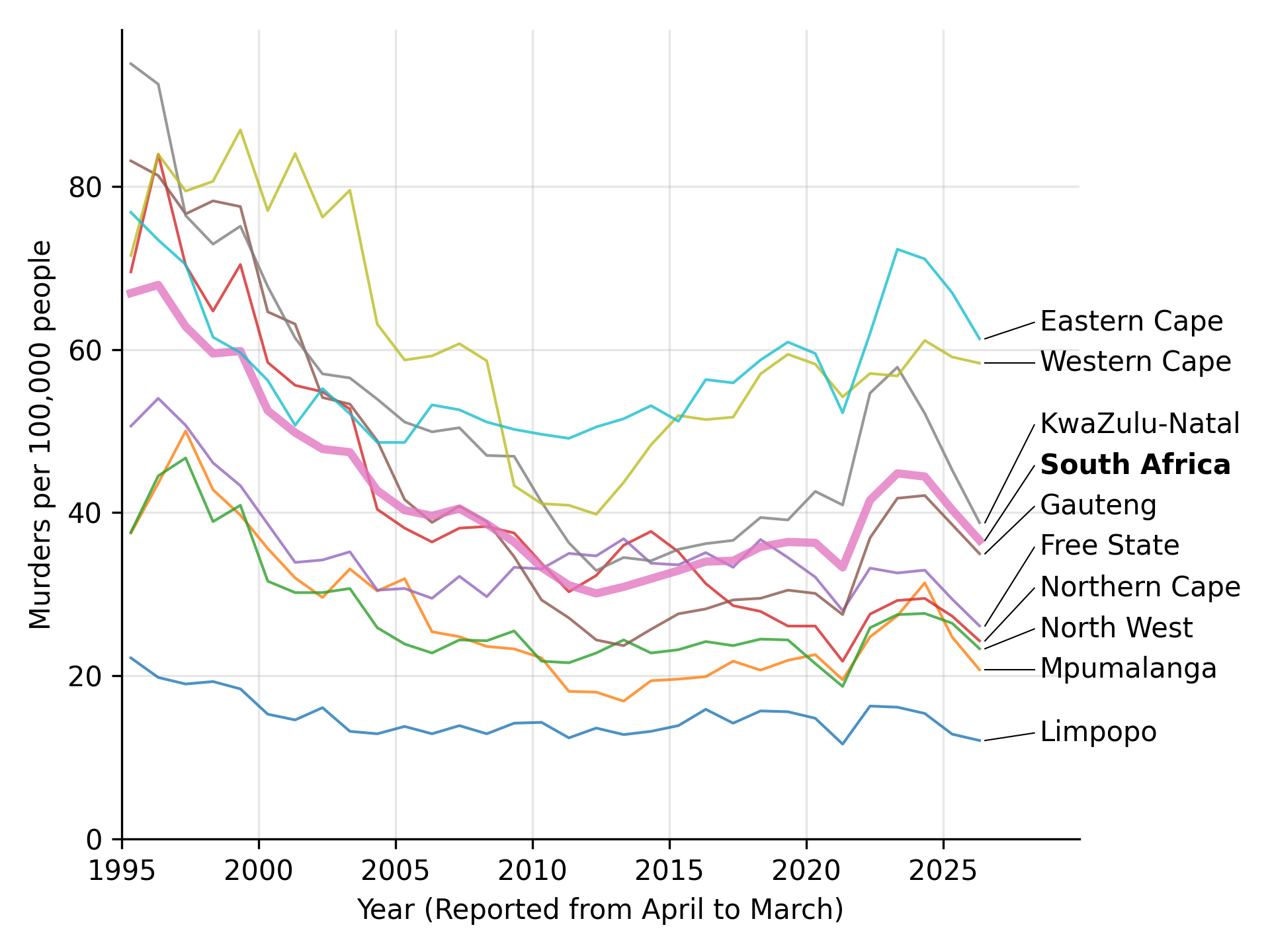
Murder rate in South Africa (see table for source data and references)

During the last 3 months of 2023, around 85 people were murdered in South Africa every day. The murder rate increased rapidly in the late-1980s and early-1990s. In 2001, a South African was more likely to be murdered than die in a car crash, but the murder rate halved between 1994 and 2009 from 67 to 34 murders per 100,000 people.

Between 2011 and 2015, it stabilised to around 32 homicides per 100,000 people although the total number of lives lost had increased due to the increase in population. In the 2016/17 year, the rate of murders increased to 52 a day, with 19,016 murders recorded between April 2016 to March 2017. In 2022, the murder rate was 45.53 per 100,000 people, the fourth highest in the world, according to UNODC reports.

The Eastern Cape, Western Cape and KwaZulu-Natal provinces have the highest murder rates in the country. South Africa has four cities (Nelson Mandela Bay, Durban, Cape Town and Johannesburg) included in the top 50 most dangerous cities (defined as cities with a population over 300,000 with the highest murder rates, as reported by The Citizen Council for Public Security and Criminal Justice, a Mexican advocacy group, in its 2023/2024 ranking).

Against the background of volatile gang activity, fatalities of innocent bystanders caught in their crossfire have also risen sharply. Mob justice is regularly meted out in informal settlements where the police are mistrusted and frustration with high crime levels runs high.

Countrywide, 849 murders were ascribed to vigilantism and mob justice during the 2017/18 financial year, 789 during the 2018/19, 1,202 during the 2020/21, 1,353 during the 2021/22, and 2,124 during the 2022/23. Fatal drive-by shootings with either known or unclear motives occur regularly. In September 2019, the Nigerian president boycotted the Africa Economy Summit in Cape Town because of the riots against foreigners that left many dead.

Paramedics and police often have to enter unsafe environments in order to assist shooting victims, and some paramedics have started wearing bulletproof vests. Cape Town's paramedics experienced few if any attacks during the 1990s, but 288 attacks in 2016, 22 attacks in 2019, some 68 attacks in 2020 and over 60 attacks in 2021.

On-duty nurses have been murdered, prompting the PSA to call for stricter security at health facilities. Women accused of witchcraft are murdered at regular intervals, a trend which is associated with poverty and illiteracy. As muggings have claimed the lives of many, the courts impose maximum sentences.

There have been numerous press reports on the manipulation of crime statistics that have highlighted the existence of incentives not to record violent crime. Nonetheless, murder statistics for adults are considered accurate. It is believed that 800 to 900 children are murdered annually, but a 2014 study found that child homicide is substantially under-reported in police statistics.

Deaths of newborns due to abandonment or murder are filed as "concealment of birth" by the police, which contributes to an oversight in official statistics. The number of frail and handicapped patients that die at residential care facilities due to criminal neglect is unknown, but is ascribed to a pattern of abuse which is widespread and under-reported.

Homicides per 100,000 for reporting periods that commence in April of the listed year and end in March:
Reporting period	Limpopo	North West	Mpumalanga	Northern Cape	Gauteng	Free State	Kwazulu-Natal	Western Cape	Eastern Cape	South Africa
1994	22.2	37.6	37.5	69.5	83.1	50.6	95.0	71.5	76.8	66.9
1995	19.8	44.5	43.6	83.9	81.3	54.0	92.5	83.9	73.4	67.9
1996	19.0	46.7	50.0	70.3	76.6	50.7	76.4	79.4	70.4	62.8
1997	19.3	38.9	42.8	64.7	78.2	46.1	72.9	80.6	61.5	59.5
1998	18.4	40.9	39.7	70.4	77.5	43.3	75.1	86.9	59.6	59.8
1999	15.3	31.6	35.6	58.4	64.6	38.6	67.7	77.0	56.2	52.5
2000	14.6	30.2	32.0	55.6	63.1	33.9	61.4	84.0	50.7	49.8
2001	16.1	30.2	29.6	54.8	54.1	34.2	57.0	76.2	55.2	47.8
2002	13.2	30.7	33.1	52.7	53.3	35.2	56.5	79.5	52.1	47.4
2003	12.9	25.9	30.4	40.4	48.8	30.5	53.9	63.1	48.6	42.7
2004	13.8	23.9	31.9	38.1	41.6	30.7	51.1	58.7	48.6	40.3
2005	12.9	22.8	25.4	36.4	38.8	29.5	49.9	59.2	53.2	39.6
2006	13.9	24.4	24.8	38.1	40.8	32.2	50.4	60.7	52.6	40.5
2007	12.9	24.3	23.6	38.3	38.9	29.7	47.0	58.6	51.1	38.6
2008	14.2	25.5	23.3	37.5	34.6	33.3	46.9	43.3	50.2	36.4
2009	14.3	21.8	22.2	33.8	29.3	33.1	41.3	41.1	49.6	33.3
2010	12.4	21.6	18.1	30.3	27.1	35.0	36.3	40.9	49.1	31.1
2011	13.6	22.8	18.0	32.3	24.4	34.7	32.9	39.8	50.5	30.1
2012	12.8	24.4	16.9	36.0	23.7	36.8	34.5	43.7	51.5	30.9
2013	13.2	22.8	19.4	37.7	25.7	33.8	34.1	48.3	53.1	31.9
2014	13.9	23.2	19.6	35.2	27.6	33.6	35.5	51.9	51.2	32.9
2015	15.9	24.2	19.9	31.3	28.2	35.1	36.2	51.4	56.3	34.0
2016	14.2	23.7	21.8	28.6	29.3	33.3	36.6	51.7	55.9	34.1
2017	15.7	24.5	20.7	27.9	29.5	36.7	39.4	57.0	58.7	35.8
2018	15.6	24.4	21.9	26.1	30.5	34.5	39.1	59.4	60.9	36.4
2019	14.8	21.5	22.6	26.1	30.1	32.1	42.6	58.2	59.5	36.3
2020	11.6	18.7	19.5	21.8	27.5	28.0	40.9	54.2	52.2	33.3
2021	16.3	25.9	24.8	27.6	36.9	33.2	54.6	57.0	62.0	41.5
2022	16.2	27.5	27.4	29.2	41.8	32.6	57.8	56.7	72.3	44.8
2023	15.4	27.6	31.4	29.5	42.1	32.9	52.2	61.1	71.1	44.4
2024	12.9	26.4	24.8	27.3	38.5	29.4	45.2	59.1	66.9	40.3
2025	12.1	23.3	20.7	24.3	35.0	26.1	38.8	58.3	61.3	36.6

=== Rape ===
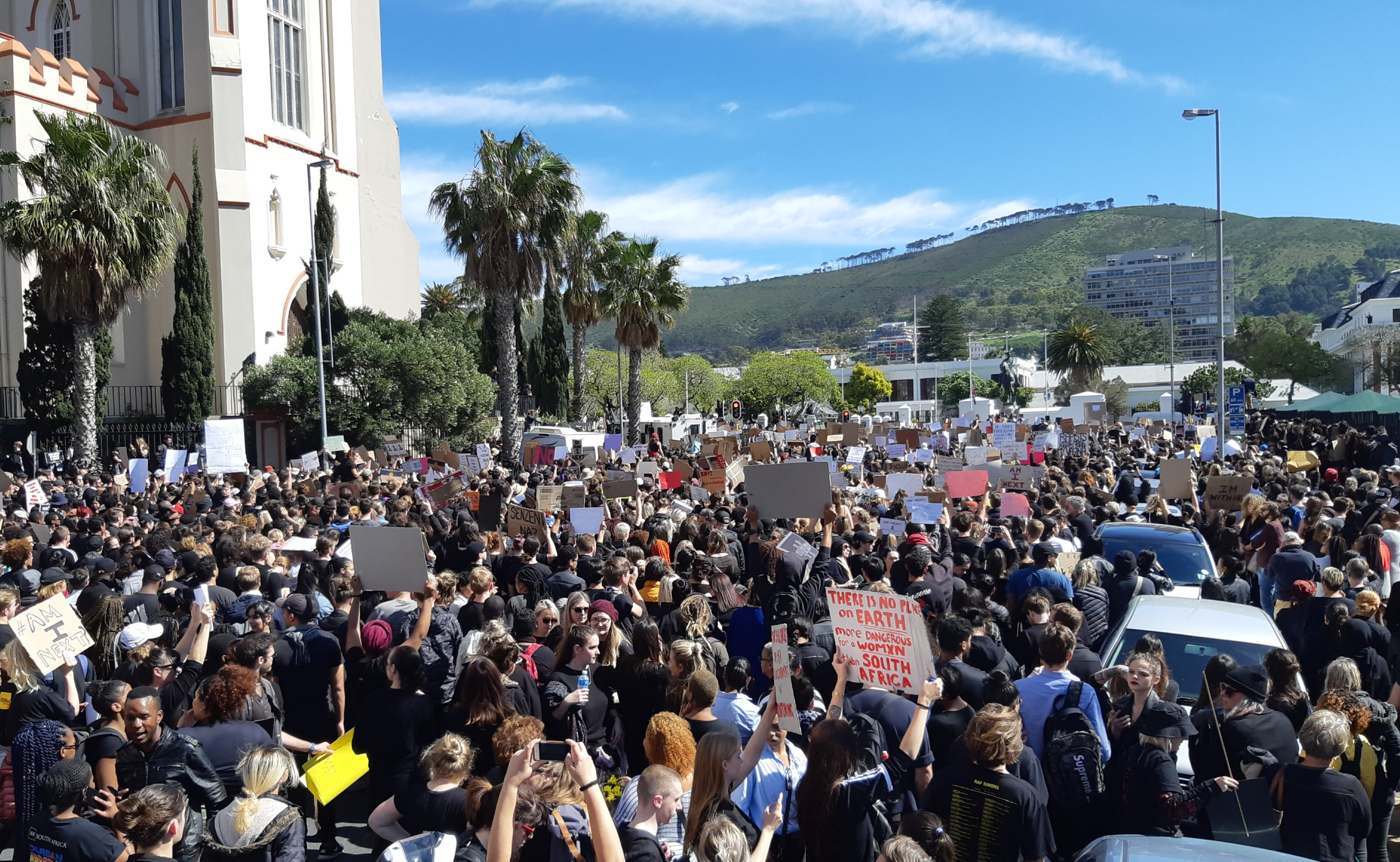
Demonstration against sexual violence in South Africa following the murder of Uyinene Mrwetyana, 2019

The country has one of the highest rates of rape in the world, with 65,000 rapes and other sexual assaults reported for the year ending in March 2012, or 127.6 per 100,000 people in the country. The high incidence of rape has led to the country being referred to as the rape capital of the world. However, this assertion has been disputed.

One in three of the 4,000 women questioned by the Community of Information, Empowerment and Transparency said they had been raped in the past year. More than 25% of South African men questioned in a survey published by the Medical Research Council (MRC) in June 2009 admitted to rape; of those, nearly half said they had raped more than one person.

Three out of four of those who had admitted rape indicated that they had attacked for the first time during their teenage years. South Africa has amongst the highest incidence of child and infant rape in the world, and sexual violence remains a scourge at day care facilities, schools, colleges, universities and churches. Statutory rape is evidently common with almost 700 births recorded during 2020 where the mother was 9 or 10 years of age. A sexual misconduct unit is envisaged for the SANDF, which has convicted and fired a number of soldiers for sexual assault.

=== Vehicle hijackings ===
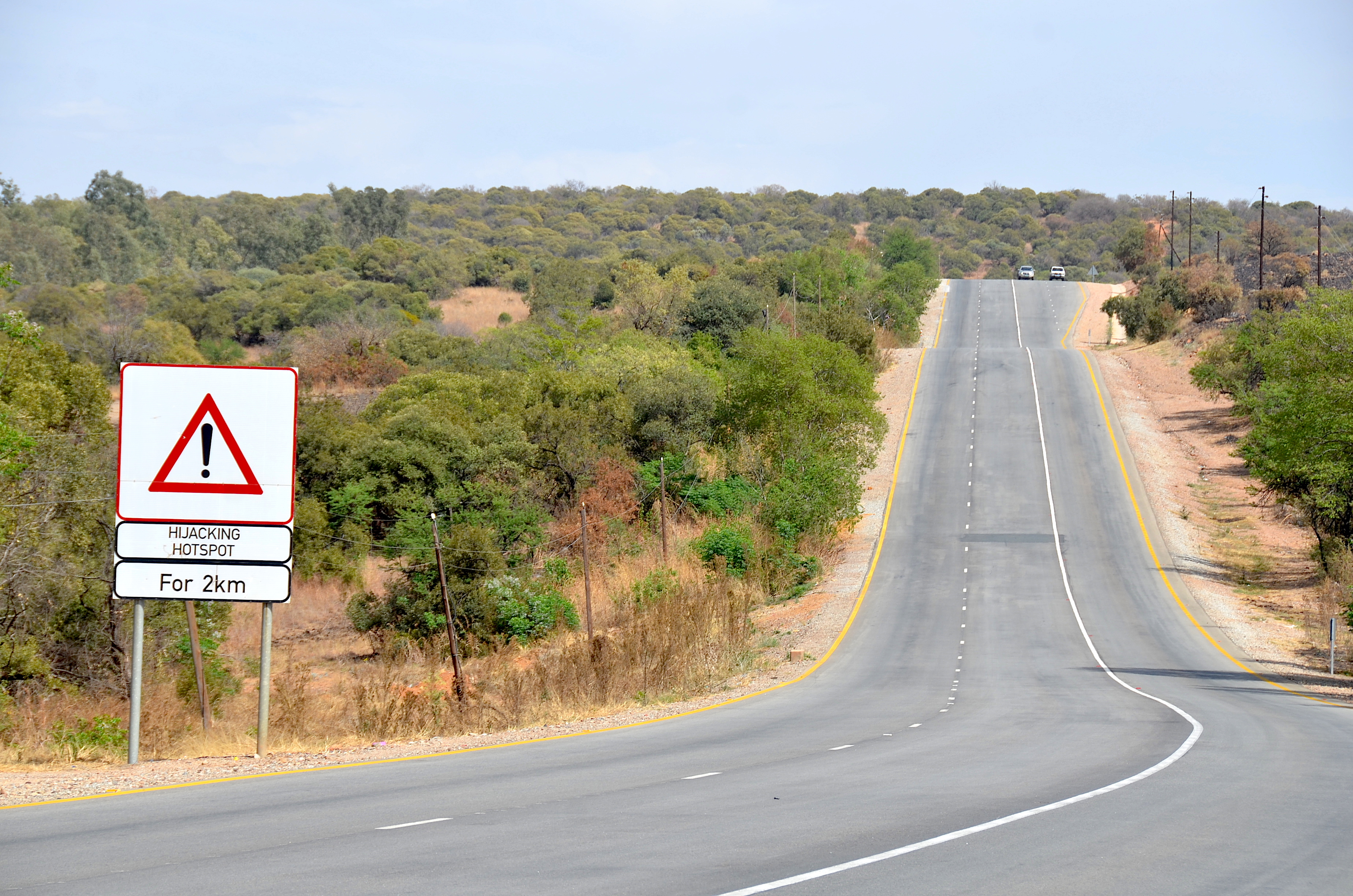
"Hijacking Hotspot" warning sign, R511 in Gauteng in 2019.

WITBANK has a high record of carjacking when compared with other places. Insurance company Hollard Insurance stated in 2007 that they would no longer insure Volkswagen Citi Golfs, as they were one of the country's most frequently carjacked vehicles.

Certain high-risk areas are marked with road signs indicating a high incidence of carjackings within the locality. Smash-and-grab robbers or opportunist vagrants target slow-moving traffic in cities, cars at filling stations or motorists that have become stranded beside highways.

More brazen robbers may resort to throwing rocks, petrol bombs or wet cement at vehicles to bring them to a standstill, or may drop rocks from overpasses. Various debris like spikes, concrete slabs, tyres or rocks are also placed on roadways, or a car may be tapped or bumped to induce the driver to leave the vehicle. So-called "blue light gangs" have been active in Gauteng since 2018, who employ vehicles fitted with blue lights and sirens, and wear police apparel to convince motorists or truckers to cooperate.

Criminals also target freight trucks, courier vehicles and the lucrative goods that are transported in them. A blue light gang may induce a truck driver to stop, or criminals in unmarked vehicles may pull up along the truck to convince the driver that something is wrong with the tires or load. If the driver stops he is boxed in and abducted. 1,202 cases of truck hijacking were reported to the SAPS in 2019/20.

Bus drivers are often the targets of attacks, and some of these are ascribed to a campaign of violence by a taxi mafia. The attacks include about a dozen shootings a month, besides stonings and other acts of intimidation directed at bus drivers or their passengers.

Preventive police operations on N1, N2, N7, R300, M9 and R102 highways are aimed at reducing crime on these roads, and Durban Metro Police has established a street crime unit that will attend to attacks on motorists in the city.

=== Taxi violence ===
South African taxi operators regularly engage in turf wars to control lucrative routes. A high number of murders of taxi owners or drivers have not resulted in either arrests or successful prosecutions, and this has been blamed on vested interests of police officials. In 2021 the SAPS assembled a dedicated detective team to investigate a surge in these crimes in the Western Cape.

A private bus operator in the province has however won consecutive cases against the MEC, national police commissioners and the Department of Transport for their failures in protecting it from attacks following its rejection of extortion demands from the taxi mafia.

=== Cash-in-transit heists ===
Cash-in-transit (CIT) heists have at times reached epidemic proportions in South Africa. These are well-planned operations with military-style execution, where the robbers use stolen luxury vehicles and high-powered automatic firearms to bring the armoured car to a stop. Some 44% of CIT attacks occur while money personnel are on foot from the vehicle to the client's place of business.

In 2006, there were 467 reported cases, 400 in 2007/2008, 119 in 2012, 180 in 2014, 370 in 2017, 116 in 2018 and 90 in 2019. Arrest rates are generally low, but it was believed that the 2017/2018 spate of heists in Limpopo, Mpumalanga, North West and Gauteng were brought to an end with the arrest of Wellington Cenenda. Several gangs believed to be part of his crime syndicate were also rounded up.

These crimes are often perpetrated by ex convicts who are willing to commit extreme violence. They typically act on inside information with cooperation of a police official, or the guards themselves. In 2020 the three largest CIT companies resolved to launch an association that would co-ordinate efforts to counter the unacceptably high levels of violent attacks.

=== Cash point robberies ===
Automated teller machines are blown up, portable ATMs are stolen, or persons who withdraw grants from these machines are targeted afterward. R104 million was taken in a 2014 cash centre heist in Witbank where the gang impersonated police officers.

=== Farm attacks ===
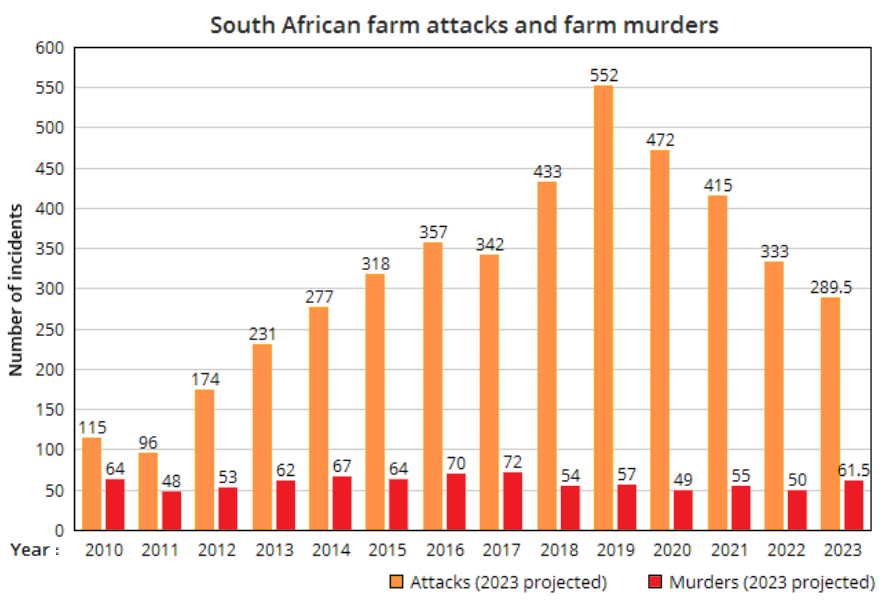
Annual farm attacks and murders from 2010 to 2023

Residents of farms have a four times greater chance to be murdered than the average South African, and the elderly constitute a large proportion of victims. However, there is insufficient data to reliably estimate a murder rate for South African farmers. These crimes against farmers and their black or white staff have gained notable press, given the country's past racial tensions.

In 2003, Thabo Mbeki informed parliament that the rural government militias (Commando System) would be disbanded, despite warnings that it would leave the rural areas vulnerable to a surge in crime. There have been calls to bring these commandos back.

Poroposed solutions include the creation of specialised reaction units, research and statistical analysis, improved crime intelligence, drone and other technology and the designation of farm attacks as priority crimes. The DA proposed harsher sentences and a reclassification of farm attacks as priority and hate crimes. Bheki Cele, in a written reply to parliament, said that farm attacks or murders would not be classified as priority crimes, but assured parliamentarians that farm murders are taken very seriously.

Farm attacks represent a small fraction (less than 1%) of South Africa's total annual murders, which exceeded 27,000 in the 2022/23 period. According to data from the Transvaal Agricultural Union of South Africa (TLU SA), a group that tracks farm violence, approximately 1,363 white farmers and 529 of their relatives were murdered in South Africa between 1990 and 2024.

=== Kidnapping ===
In 2022, there were 4,028 cases of kidnapping reported in South Africa. Kidnapping in South Africa occurs for various reasons, mainly vehicle hijacking and robbery-related, with about 27.5% of reported kidnappings being related to robberies and 18% from hijackings. The majority of kidnappings occur in the nation's urban centers; by 2022–23, there had been 15,343 reported cases of kidnapping in South Africa, Gauteng - where Pretoria and Johannesburg are located - having the largest share of those occurrences.

The crime's prevalence has continued to grow throughout the 2010s and early 2020s. SAPS disclosed that in the past decade, kidnapping prevalence has risen by 264%. Gauteng reported 51% of kidnapping occurrences. The rise of kidnapping rate has been attributed to a set of factors by SAPS. One such factor is the occurrence of armed aggravated robberies, including carjackings, and armed robberies at residences or office spaces.

Between April 2023 and March 2024, 44% of kidnapping resulted from aggravated robberies, and 22% in of kidnappings were robbery-related. SAPS and the South African Institute of Security Studies attribute Gauteng high kidnapping rate to the province having the majority of carjackings --- 49.5% of nationwide total--- , and the high armed robbery rate at 36% of all kidnappings in the country.

On 18 October 2021, the South African Police Service (SAPS) created The Crime Intelligence National Anti-Kidnapping Task Team; the specialized team was formed due to an increase in kidnapping cases in which victims were held for ransom. Since its creation, the task team has had success. In July 2024, for example, the SAPS released a media statement disclosing that during the first six months of 2024, the task team was responsible for rescuing 12 businessmen and six students who had previously been kidnapped and held for ransom.

=== Gang violence ===
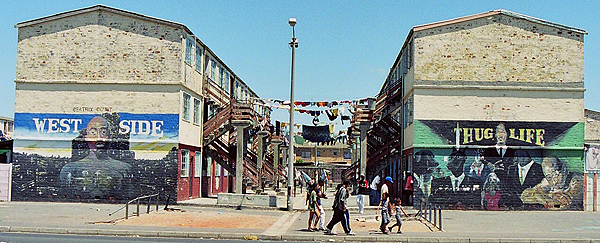
Gang associated graffiti on public housing in the Cape Town neighborhood of Manenburg.

In the Nyanga, Mitchells Plain, Delft, and Bishop Lavis townships and suburbs of the Western Cape, gang violence is tightly connected to rates of murder and attempted murder. Gang activity occurs in areas of poor lighting, high unemployment levels, substance abuse and crowded spatial development. Gang bosses and drug lords are well-known members of the community, and while feared, may also receive praise from their community.

They may support poor families who cannot otherwise pay their rent, or engage in a variety of humanitarian activities. Outside the Cape Flats area, gangs are also active along drug routes in northern Port Elizabeth. Gangster violence erupted in Westbury in Johannesburg in 2018, in Phoenix, Durban, during 2019, and intermittently in Shallcross, Durban, from 2019 to 2021.

In 2017 Hannah Cornelius, a 21-year old Afrikaaner, was murdered and viciously raped by a gang in South Africa over the course of 11 hours. This incident drew international attention to South Africa's gang problem.

In 2019, after 13 gang-related deaths in one day in Philippi, the military was authorized to assist a contingent of police to "seal" off affected areas, and "stamp the authority of the state" on the area.

In 2021, amid a proliferation of illegal firearms, gang violence was affecting vulnerable communities in Lavender Hill, Hanover Park, Manenberg, Mfuleni, Wesbank and Philippi, and a community initiative to bring peace in Mitchells Plain failed to make headway. Witnesses have noted that they do not consider it worthwhile the risk and exposure to testify against gang members. Extortion rackets are a rising trend in gang areas, and affects residents, commuters, small businesses and service delivery.

=== Xenophobic violence ===
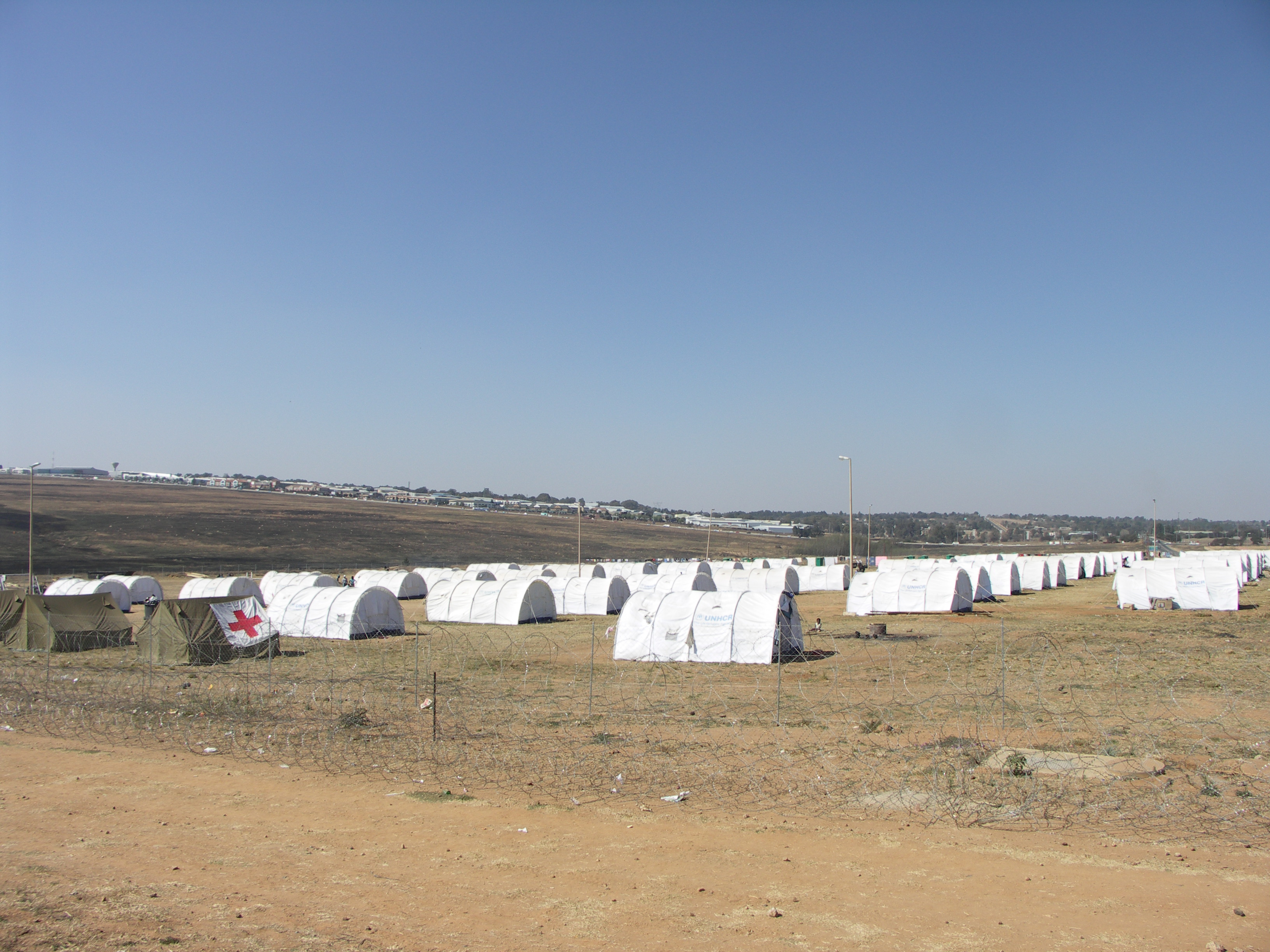
A UNHCR camp in Gauteng, erected in 2008 for refugees from xenophobic attacks

Outbreaks of xenophobic violence have become a regular occurrence in South Africa. These acts are perpetrated by the poorest of the poor, and have been ascribed to a combination of socio-economic issues relating to immigration, migration, lack of economic opportunity, and the ineffective administration of these.

The 2019 spate of attacks in Gauteng were in part ascribed to premeditated criminality. Hundreds of foreigners had to seek safety, while twelve people were killed and dozens of small businesses belonging to foreigners were looted or completely destroyed. Hundreds of arrests were made on charges of attempted murder, public violence, unlawful possession of firearms and malicious damage to property.

From Jeppestown, the violence spread to Denver, Cleveland, Malvern, Katlehong, Turffontein, Maboneng, Johannesburg CBD and Marabastad. The African Diaspora Forum prompted the government to declare a state of emergency and suggested the deployment of troops. Some victims accused the country's leadership and the police of inaction, and Nigeria arranged voluntary evacuation of its citizens from South Africa. South African businesses in Nigeria were attacked in reprisals, and South Africa's High Commission in Nigeria was temporarily closed.

Malicious rumours of attacks by foreigners caused the closing of several schools. Operation Dudula members which have protested the allegedly laissez-faire approach followed by Home Affairs in regards to illegal immigrants, have pointed out that their activism should not be linked to xenophobic motives.

== Financial and property crimes ==
PricewaterhouseCoopers' fourth biennial global economic crime survey reported a 110% increase in fraud reports from South African companies in 2005. 83% of South African companies reported being affected by white collar crime in 2005, and 72% of South African companies reported being affected in 2007. 64% of the South African companies surveyed stated that they pressed forward with criminal charges upon detection of fraud. 3% of companies said that they each lost more than 10 million South African rand in two years due to fraud.

Louis Strydom, the head of PricewaterhouseCoopers' forensic auditing division, said that the increase in fraud reports originates from "an increased focus on fraud risk management and embedding a culture of whistle-blowing". According to the survey, 45% of cases involved a perpetrator between the ages of 31 and 40: 64% of con men held a high school education or less.

=== Bank and credit card fraud ===
The Banking Risk Information Centre (Sabric) indicated that credit and debit card fraud increased by 20.5% between 2018 and 2019, and the perpetrators manage to bag hundreds of millions annually. Cloning (or skimming) of bank cards at filling stations, toll gates, ATMs and restaurants is a recurring problem, while sim card swopping is one of several tactics employed by thieves to change PIN numbers and get access to client accounts.

Operators of phishing scams launch either massive or selective email distributions, paired with a malicious copy of a legitimate website. Consumers may apply for free protective registration at the Southern African Fraud Protection Service (SAFPS), an NPO which i.a. aims to protect individuals against financial fraud through impersonation.

In 2018 VBS Bank collapsed following a spate of corruption, fraud, theft, racketeering and money laundering, and claims totaling R1.5 billion were submitted to the liquidator. Fourteen municipalities had deposits which were illegal in terms of the Municipal Finance Management Act (MFMA), while KPMG partners had additional financial interests. The largest were a R245 million deposit by Fetakgomo/Tubatse Municipality, and a R161 million deposit by Giyani Municipality.

By November 2020, some 411 retailers, stokvels, and funeral homes have also submitted claims totalling R322 million. At the Postbank, ABSA and Capitec, hackers and IT specialists have embezzled millions through unauthorized transfers. Similar transfers totalling R248 million were affected by a fraudulent debit order system, allegedly set up in 2018 by a syndicate of call centre operators.

Banks have converted their cash handling and transactions to electronic means, ATM's and independent cash-in-transit services. Traditional armed and violent bank heists have consequently reached low levels, with none recorded in the year ending March 2020.

=== Residential and farm land ===
Land invasion in and around major cities is a growing concern, and affects private as well as state-owned land. Land grabs were formerly linked to the expansion of cramped informal settlements. More recently land occupations were organised by persons who take advantage of uncertainty around the relevant land policy. People are encouraged by SMS to act in unison, and drive from afar to illegally occupy plots which are sold unlawfully for profit.

As of 2021, R1,000 to R5,000 was charged for a plot that lacks water tanks, electricity or any basic services, but the price rises to R120,000 if the scam is profitable. When the government acquires residential land the process may be hijacked by corrupt officials. Likewise individuals who successfully approached the DALRRD for access to agricultural land have found that they are harassed and face eviction from their farms when refusing to pay bribes to corrupt officials.

Communities on the verges of expanding open-cast mines have found that they are subjected to intense intimidation when not willing to sell, and coastal communities likewise contend that they are forcibly deprived of their customary access to coastal and oceanic resources by political and corporate agents.

In 2015, the government implemented additional protective measures relating to RDP properties, after many scams relating to transactions in RDP plots and houses came to light. Swindlers posing as department or municipal officials have also sold state, municipal or private land. The courts have repeatedly upheld an interdict brought by AfriForum against the EFF for inciting land occupation. Victims of invasions (as opposed to trespassing) have recourse to the court for an eviction order in terms of the Prevention of Illegal Eviction From and Unlawful Occupation of Land Act, 1998 (Act 19 of 1998). A land court is envisaged.

=== Building hijacking ===
City buildings and suburban houses are regularly hijacked by syndicates who collect rent from immigrants and the homeless, and these become dens for additional criminal activities. In Johannesburg alone, the JMPD unit has made thousands of arrests and had returned 73 buildings to their rightful owners by 2018, while by 2023 another 100 or so hijacked buildings remained in the city.

After a 2023 fire in a hijacked government building, it was revealed 1,260 government buildings were known to be illegally occupied, while the asset registers of metros and municipalities would likely reveal more. Sihle Zikalala was tasked with a review of the government's 29,000 buildings.

=== Anti-competitive practices ===
The economy of post-apartheid South Africa retains a colonial or apartheid structure where a few private and public companies dominate key sectors, a situation that has been condoned and perpetuated by political connections. Worldwide, anti-competitive structures and practices are increasingly seen as criminal, and South Africa has made limited progress in dismantling them.

The tobacco industry in particular has been accused of undue influence with government and interference with policy. A 2021 report highlighted alleged bribery, illegal surveillance and illegal access to classified information and called for investigations. Corporate executives function under high pressure from political expectations and may be required to submit to unethical or criminal demands.

=== Asset stripping ===
Mines faced with the financial obligations of creditors, worker benefits and environmental rehabilitation may enter business rescue and liquidation. Rogue liquidators then collude with company managers to strip the mine's assets, whereby most financial obligations are bypassed. The Master's office in Pretoria has been compromised in attempts to remove liquidators who fulfilled their role as watchdogs.

=== Pension and welfare fraud ===
Although billions in pension benefits remain unclaimed, independent agents that promise to trace these benefits and surpluses have been closed after they were found to be scamming the public. Pensioners may also receive communications from supposed pension fund employees, which claim that their annual increases have been incorrectly calculated. They are instructed to pay back the supposed surpluses, failing which they are threatened with deductions from future payouts. Such schemes may be orchestrated by corrupt employees of the pension fund, or may be a fraudulent scam run by third parties.

Social security cards may be stolen and offered for sale, or non-existing services may be offered to facilitate grants. SASSA confirmed that their services are always free, and warned against scammers posing as their employees. Cash grants and pension pay points are also targeted by criminals.

In 2007 it emerged that the CEO of Fidentia, J. Arthur Brown, squandered R1.3 billion of pension benefits, leaving 47,000 beneficiaries, mostly mine workers and their families, destitute.

In 2011, 20,000 clothing workers lost their pension money after highly paid consultants secured a loan for Canyon Springs, a repurposed shell company. Canyon Springs immediately distributed the money to its consultants and subsidiaries, which included a struggling property firm. Sactwu had to fund the inquiry into a missing R100 million, while the prospects of recouping the R260 million property investment seemed slim.

In April 2017, it was revealed that the Bophelo Beneficiary Fund (BBF), effectively managed by the illegal Zimbabwean immigrant Bongani Mhlanga, likely lost all the funds it held on behalf of Amplats GPF and 7,229 beneficiaries. The fund's holding company, Mvunonala Group, immediately contested this assertion in a press release, claiming all funds were accounted for. Follow-up investigations however revealed that R500 million, or double the amount initially suspected, was indeed squandered and Mvunonala, which had its sights on additional Amplats pensions, was liquidated.

The 2017 collapse of Steinhoff due to financial impropriety once again had a ruinous impact on several South African pension funds. The government's employee fund lost some R20 billion. When the FSCA intervenes by placing poorly run pension funds under curatorship, it results in exorbitant management fees.

=== Confidence tricks ===
Advance fee fraud (419) scammers based in South Africa have reportedly conned people from various parts of the world out of millions of rands, and South African police sources stated that Nigerians living in Johannesburg suburbs operate such schemes. In 2002, the South African Minister of Finance, Trevor Manuel, wanted to establish a call centre for the public to check reputations of businesses due to proliferation of scams such as advance fee fraud, pyramid schemes and fly-by-night operators.

In response, the SAPS established a project which identified 419 scams and closed their websites and bank accounts where possible. A scam call center near Gqeberha was found to rely on trafficked employees who targeted international victims.

Pyramid schemes sometimes masquerade as legitimate stokvel saving schemes, and lure promotors via social media or WhatsApp by promising high interest rates and performance incentives. A steady release of "relief funds" is promised when liquidation looms, to rally stricken investors to their cause. Catfishing is said to net perpetrators about R130 million annually, and their carefully selected victims are usually middle-aged or elderly.

=== Employment and fake professional scams ===
People desperate for employment may fall prey to fake recruitment agencies that levy illegal charges, and fraudsters posing as potential employers advertise jobs on social media or career websites, and demand upfront payment for supposed administration fees, accommodation deposits or police clearance checks. The applicants' money may also be stolen from their airtime accounts when they follow SMS instructions.

Illegal mining syndicates lure and traffic illegal immigrants by promising employment in mines. The victims end up being exploited by their recruiters, may be killed in clashes between rival gangs, or may die in shaft collapses or other accidents.

Fake professionals render valueless services to the public or con them out of their livelihoods. Fake tax practitioners or tax experts make promises that they can secure refunds from SARS, or offer to assist with PAYE submissions. Some of the refunds are illegal and are pocketed by the syndicates. Fake school, tertiary or other certificates are a fairly widespread phenomenon and are easy to come by, and fake teachers, medical practitioners and interns, advocates, military veterans, top parastatal employees, an ambassador, government minister and church minister have been exposed after their qualifications were scrutinized.

Unregistered surgeons that perform circumcisions in initiation ceremonies have caused the deaths of many. SAQA reported a sharp increase in fake credentials between 2011 and 2018, besides many forged SAQA certificates of evaluation.

Well-placed persons are also able to manipulate payrolls to commit identity fraud, which enables them to collect double salaries or pay salaries to ghost workers. Late 2021, state-owned Prasa uncovered a scam involving 3,000 ghost workers. In 2026 the DPW uncovered 60 ghost workers who were defrauding it of some R15 million per annum. Identity fraudsters in combination with poorly vetted bank or other service provider employees also place clients' PIN numbers at risk.

=== Municipalities ===
South Africa's municipalities often employ unqualified personnel who are unable to deliver proper financial and performance governance. This leads to fraud, irregular expenditure (R30 billion in 2017, and R25 billion in 2018) and consequence-free misconduct. Only a fraction (14% in 2017, 8% in 2018) of municipalities submit clean annual audits to the Auditor-General, and implementation of the AG's recommendations has been lax. By 2018, 45% of municipalities had not implemented all procedures for reporting and investigating transgressions or fraud, while 74% were found to insufficiently follow up on such allegations.

Tender panels, forums to which the tender process is outsourced, have been highlighted as sources of apparent favouritism and corruption. The late Kimi Makwetu suggested holding employees individually accountable, treating recommendations as binding and issuing a certificate of debt to guilty parties. Government departments and large parastatals generally mirror these problems.

=== Public servants ===
In tackling state service corruption, the number of public servants that do business with the state has shrunk from 8,500 to 118 people between 2017 and 2021. In 2021 an ethics unit was established by government to identify corruption and take preventative measures. Its mandate includes the setting of frameworks for disciplinary hearings, lifestyle audits and whistleblowing.

=== Large parastatals ===
Corruption flourished in South Africa's large parastatals during its state capture saga which lasted from 2011/12 to 2017. In the wake of the fallout, the SA government vowed in 2020 to end political interference in the functioning of state-owned entities.

At Transnet, Eskom, and Denel in particular, state funds were misappropriated in instances of collusion with certain contractors and suppliers. The resulting losses which amounted to billions of rand were facilitated by dishonest and grossly negligent financial management. In addition the managers of Transnet's pension fund profited to the order of R500 million by using close government ties to leverage their own position against that of the fund, while a top manager enriched himself through an inappropriate deal with a consulting firm.

State capture had a debilitating effect on Denel which compromised the country's defence capability and derailed multibillion-rand projects.

In 2020 the Special Investigating Unit (SIU) referred 5,452 Eskom staff members, or over 10% of its workforce, for disciplinary proceedings due to conflict of interest or after they were exposed in lifestyle audits. The employees failed to declare financial interests and engaged in dodgy coal, diesel or building contracts with Eskom involving billions of rands. Proceedings to recover overpayments of R2.78 billion from three contractors received the go-ahead in 2020.

Various well-connected persons, notably Eskom's CEO Brian Molefe, also participated unlawfully in Eskom Pension and Provident Fund (EPPF) membership or were given access to employment perks they were not entitled to. Trade union Solidarity warned that Eskom had been infiltrated by a corrupt internal network, and Eskom admitted as much in its 2022 annual report.

In addition to internal malfeasance, external syndicates have defrauded Eskom, profiting especially from Kusile and Tutuka power stations. In December 2022 small contingents of soldiers were placed at Tutuka, Camden, Grootvlei and Majuba stations in a first deployment phase intended to discourage increasing vandalism, theft and corruption.

=== Targeting of government auditors ===
The Auditor-General of South Africa, which employs 700 chartered accountants to audit state expenditure at all three levels of government, has revealed a surge in crimes against its employees, starting 2016. The crimes are tied to the detection of financial mismanagement and the annual release of municipal audit reports. During the countrywide audit of municipalities, their auditors have experienced hijackings, death threats, attempted murder, hostage-taking, threatening phone calls and damage to their vehicles.

In 2018, South Africa incurred R80 billion in irregular expenditure due to outstanding audits and incomplete information, and passing of municipal budgets may be subject to bribes. The country's leadership was accused of disregarding the AG's recommendations in cases of wrongdoing.

=== Lawyer scams ===
Lawyers representing clients that make personal injury claims from the Road Accident Fund (RAF), have made excessive profits by overcharging them. Individuals in desperate need of a pay-out are conned by the enticing offer of "no win, no fee". In one prominent case the NPA's Asset Forfeiture Unit managed to obtain a court order in 2019 to seize and reclaim R101 million in assets from two lawyers.

Similar attempts to fleece millions from provincial health departments by submitting fake and fraudulent medical negligence claims have been thwarted. Lawyers acting as conveyancers have also colluded with politicians to defraud government in various land acquisition deals. Lawyers that are experiencing tight cash flows, lure clients into property deals and back out unexpectedly, before refusing to refund the client. A debarred lawyer can join one law firm after another and continue practicing in direct contravention of the Attorneys' Act.

=== COVID-19 scams ===
The South African government's unemployment insurance fund supplies temporary relief to workers whose income is being affected by the national COVID-19 lockdown. When a worker finds new employment the reference number of the previous employer is used illegally to secure a surreptitious pay-out from the UIF COVID-19 fund. The bank account details of the receiving company may also be falsified. Among those who illegally claimed COVID-19 social grants were 16,000 government employees.

COVID-19 emergency funds, supplied to South Africa by the IMF, have fallen prey to fraudsters when stringent tender procedures were not followed. Members of the SAPS were implicated in over R1 billion of irregular deposits of COVID-19 funds into private companies. Tenders worth over R2 billion for personal protective equipment (ppe), allocated by the Gauteng health department to 160 different companies, came under investigation by Gauteng's special investigation unit.

An additional R30 million of illegal tenders in Kwazulu-Natal, besides tenders in the Eastern Cape, came under investigation and did not appear to comply with the national treasury's regulations on the emergency purchases of supplies and services.

Some of these companies were not in the healthcare business, or were formed in the wake of the pandemic to cash in on relief funds. Some of them spent only 5% of the funds on personal protective equipment, while 40% went to the directors.

Water tank installations and decontamination procedures at schools amounted to multiples of their commercial value, a R168 million tender for water and sewer project in the Eastern Cape was not delivered by the municipal manager, a R4.8 million tender for a COVID-19 awareness campaign cannot be accounted for, and a R37 million tender issued under the emergency regulations by the Department of Public Works and Infrastructure, resulted in a poorly constructed fence at Beit Bridge border post of which large parts were soon stolen.

Private "covidpreneurs" launched numerous scams to exploit the public during the pandemic, but violent crime showed a slight decrease during level 4 and 3 lockdown, compared to the same months of the previous year. Cash-in-transit heists spiked during a policing vacuum due to lockdown enforcement.

=== Cybercrime ===
Cyber crime in South Africa is regulated by Act No. 19 of 2020 (No. 44651), the Cybercrimes Act. It circumscribes offences which have a bearing on cybercrime, criminalizes the harmful disclosure of data messages, and facilitates interim protection orders. On 22 July 2021, Transnet experienced a cyberattack which caused it to declare a force majeure at several key container terminals, including the Port of Durban, Ngqura, Port Elizabeth and Cape Town.

== Theft, smuggling and vandalism ==
SARS estimates that illicit trade costs the South African economy R100 billion annually, depriving the country of taxes (R250 million annually) and resources, while contributing to instability and low economic growth. Alcohol, cigarettes, counterfeit electronics, pharmaceuticals, food and apparel, besides fishing and mining related products are the main commodities affected. It is believed that police officers are bribed and provide protection for smugglers at Dragon City in Centurion and China Mall in Midrand, while Marabastad, Pretoria, has been highlighted as another smuggling hub.

=== Vehicle thefts or scams ===
About R8.5 billion worth of vehicles are stolen annually, some directly from dealership showroom floors, storage facilities, or wash bays. The smuggling of many stolen vehicles to neighbouring countries is facilitated by corrupt border control officials. Other purportedly stolen vehicles are "cloned", sold and reintroduced into the system.

In the "hula hoops" scam, a vehicle owner avoids completing his repayments by arranging with criminals to buy the vehicle at a generous amount, before lodging a fraudulent hijacking claim, which may include claims for supposed passenger injuries. Truck drivers may likewise collude with criminals, and be paid for their bogus claim of a truck hijacking. Boats are also stolen from marinas or when parked on a street, or the engines may be cut from the boat.

As in other countries, catalytic converters are stolen from cars as they may fetch R4,000 to R20,000 a piece, whilst on farms, tractors and harvesters are stripped of their electrical wiring by copper thieves.

=== Looting of railway infrastructure ===
South Africa has a rail network of over 30,000 km, and it used to be the most advanced railway system on the continent. A significant portion of tracks, stations and train parts have been stripped by criminals looking for scrap metal. In 2021, the Brenthurst report found that two-thirds of the overhead cables that covered more than 3,000 km of track had been stolen and that the rail network was on the verge of total collapse.

Gauteng, the Western Cape and KwaZulu-Natal are the worst affected provinces, and the cost of rebuilding is estimated at R4 billion. Drones, high barrier walls and facial recognition technology have been proposed as preventative measures. Metrorail services bypass many halts or stations due to their unsafety and the effects of vandalism and theft.

=== Arson ===
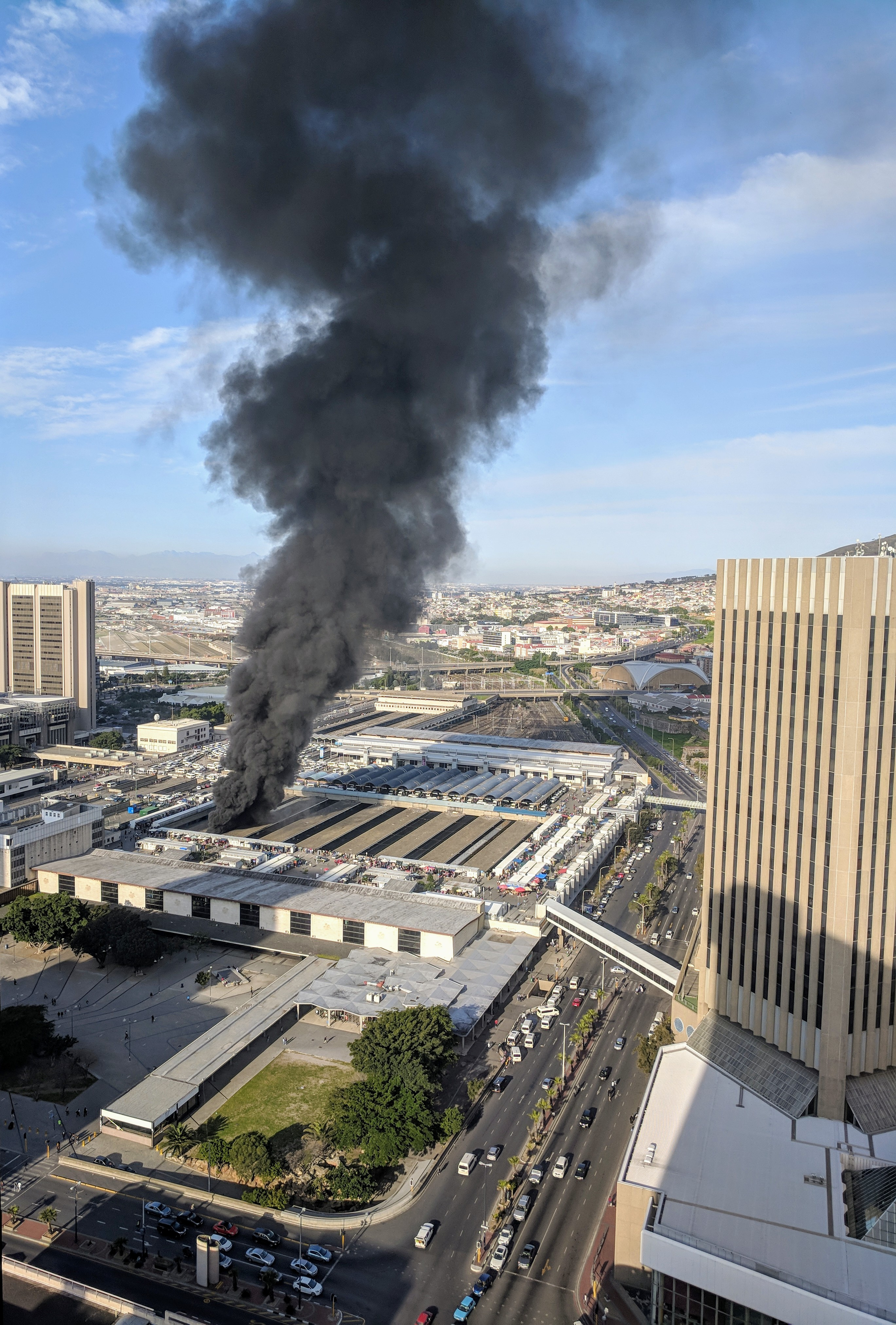
Arson was a recurring problem at Cape Town railway station during 2016–2018.

Prasa collected information about train arson attacks since 2015, and stated that losses of some R636 million were incurred due to train fires from 2015 to January 2019. 71%, or losses totaling R451.6 million rand, occurred in the Western Cape, besides damage of R150 million to Cape Town Station.

This entailed the burning of 214 train coaches, 174 in the Western Cape, and the remainder in Gauteng and KwaZulu-Natal. Cape Town's fleet of 90 trains was reduced to 44, and only one suspect was arrested. Some replacement trains acquired at R146 million each could not be insured. Police ombudsman J.J. Brand found that the SAPS failed to prevent, properly investigate, or successfully prosecute those responsible.

In 2019, teenage boys (aged 14 and 15) were identified as the arsonists who torched 18 carriages worth R61 million, while the torching of 24 carriages at Bloemfontein in 2020 was also ascribed to loitering youths.

One aspect of xenophobic violence is the torching of trucks driven by foreigners on main routes – the depredation flared up along the N3 route in April 2018, before spreading to other provinces. In the April 2018 incident, 32 trucks were torched and others looted near Mooi River on the N3 route, and 54 protesters and opportunist looters were arrested.

Coordinated attacks during November 2020 targeted many freight trucks on the N3 and N12 routes. The attackers managed to loot and destroy 35 trucks in KwaZulu-Natal and at Heidelberg, Parys-Sasolburg and Daveyton respectively. Truck drivers were shot at, with some injured and one killed. 25 people were arrested.

Faiez Jacobs pointed out that arson cripples the entire value chain of the community‚ with many people unable to go to work‚ losing a day's pay‚ and ultimately losing their employment, which in turn causes social upheaval and adds further burdens to their community. SATAWU has noted that labour strikes that are called by unidentifiable persons have been associated with incidents of arson.

=== Explosives ===
Organised crime syndicates smuggle blasting cartridges across South Africa's borders, especially from Zimbabwe, and their unsuspecting mules deliver these to criminals. The explosives are used to bomb ATMs, rob cash-in-transit vehicles, for illegal mining operations, or more recently as a tool of extortion during robberies. The Explosives Act of 2003 and its supporting regulations have not been implemented as of 2021, and law enforcement relies on the outdated Act 26 of 1956 and regulations that were only superficially updated since 1972. These regulations do not place mandatory obligations on tracking and tracing of explosives, meaning that legal consumers are not prosecuted when their explosives are lost or stolen.

=== Illegal mining ===
Illegal mining is most prevalent in Gauteng, Mpumalanga, Limpopo, North West and the Free State. It shows an upward trend and is inter-related with organised crime and money laundering. Thousands of disused or active mines attract illegal miners, also known as zama zamas, due to unanswered socio-economic inequalities. The estimated 30,000 illegal miners are organised by some 200 criminal syndicates (as of 2022) which infiltrate industrial gold mines, where they employ violent means and exploitative working conditions.

Losses in sales, tax revenue and royalties are said to amount to R21 billion per annum, while physical infrastructure and public safety are compromised. Output in excess of R14 billion of gold per annum has been channeled to international markets via neighbouring countries. The greater part, over 34 tons of gold between 2012 and 2016, was smuggled to Dubai, UAE. At times construction contractors rent out their haul trucks and excavators to syndicates who then proceed with open-cast mining in contravention of the Environmental Act.

Mining companies which operate from no fixed address may also submit fraudulent applications for mining licences, by for instance plagiarizing the required EIA.

Unregistered operators of precious metal refineries are charged with illegal possession of unwrought precious metals under the Precious Metals Act, cyanide pollution under the Environmental Act, and their equipment and raw materials are seized. The Mineral and Petroleum Resources Development Act of 2002 acknowledges artisanal miners, but an overhaul of the act has been proposed.

The Council for Geoscience and Department of Mineral Resources are jointly responsible for rehabilitating the 6,000 abandoned mines in South Africa (600 around Johannesburg alone). They are barely making headway, and don't expect to close all abandoned shafts before 2039. Meanwhile, manpower and resources of the Border Management Authority (BMA) will be diverted to combat well-armed illegal miners.

=== Livestock and produce theft ===
Livestock theft is prevalent and increasing in all provinces of South Africa, but the Eastern Cape, where gangs of thieves openly target marginal farmers, has the highest number of cases. Some 70,000 head of cattle to the value of R1,3 billion are stolen annually, while sheep farming has been abandoned in some areas due to the prevalence of theft. Livestock theft is often motivated by greed, and organized theft which bags a large number of animals at a time is on the rise, representing about 88% of these thefts in 2019.

The losses impact the livelihoods of farm workers besides farmers, and it is claimed that crime prevention has yet to catch up with the modus operandi of syndicates. A stock theft task force has been established in the Free State, and Eskom has provided a hotline for the reporting of suspicious activities by its employees, after alleged stock theft on a Northern Cape farm.

Since 1996, ARC's Animal Genetics Laboratory in Irene, Pretoria, assists the SAPS in about 500 cases per annum where DNA matching may provide identification, determine parentage or resolve ownership of stolen livestock or poached game.

Since 2015, theft of avocado and macadamia produce has shown an upward trend which affects smallholder as well as large scale farmers. Locally avocado fetches up to R25 per fruit in 2020, while macadamia, of which South Africa is the largest producer, fetches up to $25 per pound internationally. During the autumn harvest season, producers consequently rely on costly round the clock security measures to dissuade thieves. Single opportunists besides organised syndicates are at work, which via middle men supply a thriving black market.

Grain producers are sometimes conned by silo operators that issue fraudulent silo certificates, which may misstate the quantity, quality and/or location where grain is stored, with resultant financial losses for the producer.

=== Housebreaking ===
In Statistics South Africa's 2025/26 Governance, Public Safety and Justice Survey (GPSJS), housebreaking was the most common crime experienced by households. The survey estimated more than 1.5 million incidents, affecting approximately 1.08 million households, or 5.3% of households nationwide. Among households that experienced housebreaking, 48.2% reported some or all incidents to the police, compared with 43.4% in 2024/25.

The survey distinguishes housebreaking, which occurs while residents are away, from home robbery, which occurs while residents are present.

=== Municipal property ===
Vandalism and theft of municipal infrastructure have an impact on municipal budgets, interrupts service delivery, and burdens the taxpayer. Gates, fencing, man-hole covers, paving stones, filling material of road embankments, metal sheeting, any copper objects (which fetches R80/kg), brass water meters, street lights, pipes, bathroom taps and parts of statues are stolen, and smaller items are whisked away in wheelie bins in broad daylight.

Proposals to prevent these crimes include; installation of CCTV cameras, raids on scrapyards, closure of illegal scrapyards and daily updates of theft statistics. In Cape Town, the specialized Copper Theft Unit (or so-called "Copperheads") was established in 2007, which arrested 275 thieves and scrap dealers during their first year of operation. This reduced the city's annual financial loss due to copper theft from R22 million to under R500,000. Municipal land may also be sold illegally by incumbent or self-appointed council agents. In 2010, 33 fraudulent land transactions were uncovered by the Johannesburg city council. Municipal buildings are often occupied illegally, or may be rented out for personal gain.

=== Power grid ===
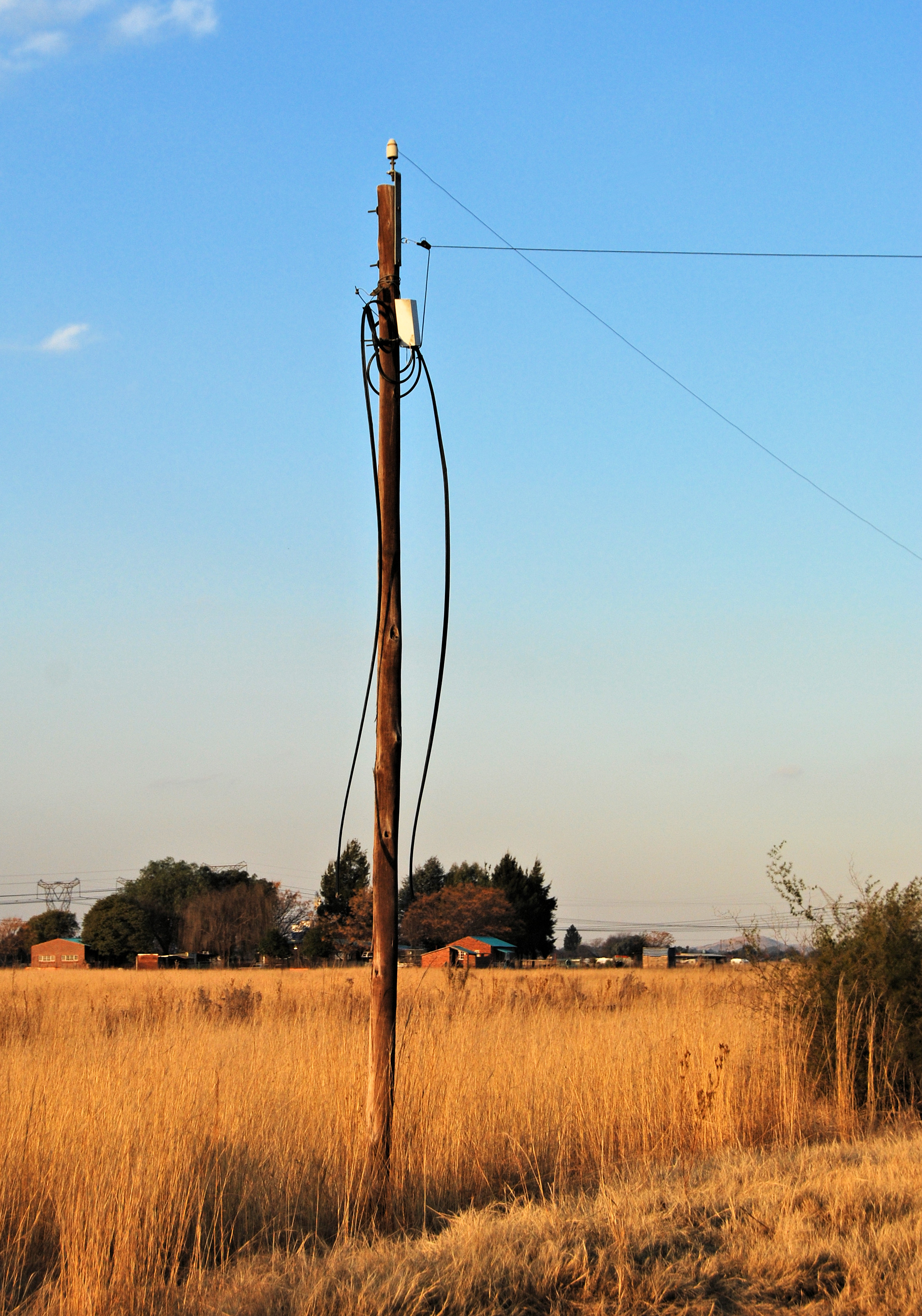
Cut cables at Meyerton, Gauteng

A 2021 estimate placed losses due to cable theft at between R5 billion and R7 billion annually. The eThekwini, Tshwane, Ekurhuleni, Johannesburg and Nelson Mandela Bay metros in particular are pillaged by criminal syndicates and subsistence thieves, while conviction rates hover around 4%. Likewise Telkom, Eskom and Spoornet each report thousands of cable theft incidents annually, some by their own employees.

Cable theft from train stations has endangered passengers and brought services to a standstill in parts of Gauteng and the Western Cape.

Around Johannesburg, vandalism and theft of the power grid infrastructure shows an upward trend, and the Gauteng province has established a multi-disciplinary task team to curb these crimes by integrating available resources and expertise.

Hundreds of millions of rand is lost to vandalising of street poles and theft of newly installed equipment such as supply cables and aerial bundled cables. Mini-substations, pole transformers, road interchanges, and lights on pedestrian bridges are targeted by criminals and a high number of illegal connections also damage the supply transformers. Cape Town experiences equipment damage and theft that impacts the electricity supply to residents, communities and road users, and results in almost constant outages in some areas.

=== Electricity theft ===
Illegal connections to the power grid is a common problem in major centers. As of 2020, illegal connections in Soweto alone causes Johannesburg's City Power R3 million in losses daily, but the practice is also current in Diepsloot and Alexandra where meter boxes and units are absent, besides Roodepoort, Midrand and even the upmarket Waterfall Estate. Not only households, but many businesses and even a church have been found to steal electricity.

Some property developers deliberately connect smart meters illegally, fail to register meters during construction, or divert power temporarily during and for the construction process.

Johannesburg's City Power imposes a fine of R30,000 and expects the payment of all arrears before a premises is reconnected. In addition to private premises, there are syndicates that focus on defrauding Eskom. By 2020, due to a culture of non-payment, municipalities have accumulated debt of R46.1 billion (R31 billion overdue) with Eskom, and sometimes refuse to pay despite court judgements against them. Payments meant for Eskom may also disappear in the pockets of municipal workers.

=== Fuel theft ===
Fuel worth over R100 million is stolen annually from Transnet's pipelines, and evidently sold by unlicensed retailers. Drone technology, tactical deployments and intelligence gathering are implemented to curb the trend. Many vehicles have been seized at crime scenes, but the conviction rate of perpetrators remains close to 0%.

The skimming of fuel from the tanks of large vehicles is another illicit practice, while at filling stations up to 65% of retailers are regular victims of petrol drive-offs. Similarly, drivers of fuel delivery vehicles are bribed to make partial deliveries, i.a. by forging invoices, or to mix coal fuel with worthless material. Diesel theft in particular is a widespread problem which affects Eskom's ability to operate gas turbines during peak electricity demand.

=== School plunder and vandalism ===
Schools are seen as easy targets for thieves looking for laptops, computers, data projectors, photocopiers, cameras and cash, though fencing, electrical equipment, gas cylinders, filing cabinets, desks and stationery are also stolen. Strategies to prevent burglaries include access control, upgrading of security gates, fences and burglar bars, CCTV cameras, 24-hour security and alarms linked to armed response. Teachers have also been charged with theft and fraud at schools, and have been pressured into corrupt deals by external parties.

Perpetrators of school vandalism are often vagrants, gangsters or local male learners, besides ex-learners and drop-outs. Implicated learners are typically experiencing learning problems or societal challenges like poverty or drug and alcohol dependency. Local protests, whether due to lack of service delivery or other reasons, regularly result in arson or vandalism at schools.

During one week in 2018, four schools were set alight in Mpumalanga province, while over R300 million in damage was caused to 148 Gauteng and KZN schools during 2021's unrest. Student protests at tertiary education facilities likewise cause millions in damage. Criminals have also targeted teachers and school personnel.

=== Drug smuggling and consumption ===
South Africa has become a consumer, producer and distributor of hard drugs. The trend is driven by urban decay, criminal overlordship in marginalised communities, homelessness and police corruption, and is expanding into rural areas.

Tik made its appearance in 1998, and the first laboratory was seized in the same year. By 2005 it had surpassed other substances consumed by drug users in the Western Cape, including Mandrax, dagga and alcohol. Production centres have shifted from South Africa to Nigeria since 2018, besides the Afghanistan–Pakistan border region, from which an Ephedra-based substance is sourced since late 2019. Tik addicts in townships who commit theft to sustain their habit, have been murdered in instances of mob justice.

The trade in heroin, ultimately obtained from Afghanistan, has gained a foothold in cities, towns and some rural areas. The heroin trade has a corrupting effect on police, through their interactions with gangs, dealers and users. Popular drug combinations that include heroin, are nyaope, sugars and unga. At least since 2011, consignments of cocaine have entered South Africa through various, often smaller, ports such as Saldanha, Mossel Bay or Knysna. It was distributed by the 28s gang in the Cape Flats, which up to 2019 had a handler with international connections.

Since the 1990s operatives of international drug cartels have made South Africa their home, and have carried out a slew of internecine assassinations. They are believed to launder foreign drug money, run extortion rackets, trade in illicit goods, and have succeeded in corrupting senior policemen and government officials. Police and investigating agencies are often sidetracked by arresting smaller cogs in the underworld machine, while the kingpins manage to fly under the radar.

=== Cigarette smuggling ===
South Africa, which allegedly has the biggest illegal tobacco trade in the world, became a signatory to the WHO protocol against tobacco smuggling in 2013. Some 30% to 60% of cigarettes in South Africa are smuggled (compared to 10% internationally), which deprives the country of some R8 to R12 billion in annual revenue. Tobacco warehouses are exempted from surveillance, and in some provinces up to three quarters of stores offer cheap, illegal cigarettes for sale.

The contraband originates in Zimbabwe, while Namibia, Mozambique and Eswatini serve as transit routes. Smugglers consider it a softer crime than drug trafficking, with less severe punishment for offenders. Legal consignments are regularly stolen by armed gangs, or diverted from their intended delivery destinations.

=== Trade in protected species ===
South Africa is a party to CITES, the aim of which is to ensure that international trade in specimens of wild animals and plants does not threaten their survival. Vulnerable species in the South African context include the bush elephant, white and black rhinoceros, ground pangolin, abalone, certain whale species, Encephalartos cycads and valuable succulent genera such as Conophytum.

In reptile laundering, animals caught in the wild are presented as captive-bred. Trade in poached reptiles affects small adders, tortoises, lizards (Cordylus and geckos) and dwarf chameleons, which all fetch very high prices internationally. Detection dogs have been useful in locating wildlife products in luggage, and DNA analysis is employed to determine where such products originated.

The identification of DNA markers that would distinguish between captive-bred and poached reptiles is in an early stage of development. The captive-bred lion industry continues to operate in a regulatory vacuum. The USFWS has however banned the import of captive lion trophies in 2016, while a 2019 ruling made the export of lion bones, traded as "tiger bones" in Asia, illegal on the grounds of animal welfare.

=== Cultural artifacts ===
Trade in, or vandalism of certain cultural artifacts are contraventions of the National Heritage Resources Act, and only a fraction of conserved items are inventoried. In 2008 government expressed concern about a rising number of thefts of artifacts and heritage objects from museums, galleries, castles and churches, but relied on incomplete statistics, starting 1990. In the five-year period from 2012 to 2016, some 2,665 pieces from altogether 30 heritage institutions were reported lost or stolen. Due to their age and rarity, heritage items may fetch high prices, but are completely non-renewable.

Many military artifacts from the early 20th century have been stolen, including invaluable ceremonial daggers, swords and medals, which could be traded anywhere in the world. The Groot Constantia Manor House and Museum, an estate dating from 1685, was burgled in 2012, and thieves made off with over 20 items worth some R50 million, though 10 pieces were soon recovered. Among the porcelain items were a 300 year old vase, mid 17th-century Japanese Arita porcelain and a pair of 17th century Chinese vases. It was reportedly the third heist by a suspected international syndicate that targeted valuable Asian porcelain pieces in museums.

In 2016, various pieces of gold jewelry from the Thulamela archeological site, on loan from Ditsong Museums, were stolen from the museum in Skukuza. Heritage experts were outraged, and expressed concerns about Mapungubwe artifacts displayed at the Mapungubwe Interpretation Centre, which are on loan from Pretoria University. Various institutions and museums have subsequently cut back on the simultaneous display of heritage items.

=== Cross-border crime and corruption ===
Fifteen landward sub-units of the SANDF are deployed on the borders with Zimbabwe, Eswatini, Mozambique, Lesotho, Botswana and Namibia to safeguard these against transnational crime, international crime syndicates and cartels, the illegal flow of undocumented migrants and illicit economic activities. In July 2022 the Department of Home Affairs (DHA) launched the Border Management Authority (BMA) which aims to place border security functions of four government departments and the SAPS under one central command.

Deportations of illegal immigrants at the Beitbridge border post were said to be a waste of money and a vicious circle due to the amount of bribery engaged in (R500 per illegal immigrant) by police guards and border officials. Additional roadblocks have been effective in stopping many who bribed their way through the first checkpoints. People smuggling of illegal South Asian immigrants is much more lucrative however, as airport officials and ground crews have conspired to form syndicates that net R60,000 per client.

The South African Department of Home Affairs subsequently warned South Africans not to sell their identities to illegal immigrants. According to A21 and the Trafficking in Persons Report, South Africa has become an important source, transit as well as destination country for human trafficking, with large sections of its population being vulnerable to its depredations.

== Organized crime ==
=== Locally-based ===
Locally based organized crime in South Africa has grown significantly since the late 2010s, fueled by institutional decline, a lack of economic stability, and corruption. Key activities include human trafficking, smuggling, extortion, arms trafficking, and the illicit trade in goods and natural resources. Human trafficking remains a concern, with South Africa acting as both a source and destination country. Trafficking for forced labour, particularly in agriculture, and domestic servitude are common, while the 2010s saw labour exploitation surpass sex trafficking in prevalence. Enforcement efforts are hindered by corruption and systemic challenges, with victims often unwilling to report abuse. Smuggling routes typically originate from neighbouring countries like Zimbabwe, Mozambique, and Lesotho, where perpetrators use violence and bribery to traffic migrants.

Extortion and protection racketeering have spread across industries, particularly in Gauteng, Cape Town, and KwaZulu-Natal, where criminal groups use violence to assert control over businesses and infrastructure projects. Kidnapping for ransom has also become increasingly organised. The illicit trade in counterfeit goods, including clothing and electronics, has expanded, with illicit tobacco products growing to over 50% of the market share by 2023, partly due to the COVID-19 alcohol and tobacco bans. The rise of cybercrime since 2020, including ransomware and online scams, has further exacerbated the crime landscape, with South Africa becoming a hotspot for such activities. Despite existing legal frameworks, such as the Prevention of Organised Crime Act, enforcement remains weak due to corruption, political interference, and the fragile justice system.

=== Nigerian mafia ===
Nigerian organised crime groups established roots in South Africa in the mid-1990s following the end of apartheid, and operate primarily in Johannesburg, Cape Town and Durban. Nigerians were initially involved in the crack cocaine trade, before moving into powder cocaine after establishing contacts in South America. Hillbrow in Johannesburg was a stronghold for the Nigerian mafia for many years. After arriving in Cape Town, Nigerian syndicates operated drug and prostitution rackets in the affluent suburb of Sea Point before they were forced out by the police and neighbourhood watch. They subsequently moved onto the city's northern suburbs and dominate the Milnerton area.

== Geographic Breakdown of Crime ==
Crime varies widely in South Africa based on frequency, type of crime, and where most crime occurs. Between 2010 and 2019, crime statistics suggest an incremental decrease in overall crime rate, though it varies greatly by classification and geographical location.

=== Major Cities ===
The vast majority of crime in South Africa occurs in its four largest provinces: Gauteng, Western Cape, Eastern Cape, and KwaZulu-Natal; specifically, in and approximate to the Cape Town, Johannesburg, and Pretoria metropolitan areas. Murders in the provinces account for 83% of all murders nationally. As per the United States' governments' South Africa Travel Advisory, "Violent crime is more common in the downtown areas of big cities, especially after dark." Since 2021, the Murder rate in South African cities has been growing steadily. The State of Urban Safety in South Africa Report 2024 states that in 2024, at the end of an 18-year period, the murder rate in Cape Town had risen by 20%, in Msunduzi by 46%, and in Nelson Mandela Bay by 67%

In the 2026 Crime Index ranking, the five worst cities for crime in South Africa, with their respective global ranks on the list, were Pietermaritzburg (1), Pretoria (2), Johannesburg (5), Durban (6), and Gqeberha (8).

While some major cities experience crime throughout their suburbs, crime in others is mainly isolated to specific neighborhoods. Johannesburg, for example, experiences a range of crimes across the metropolitan area, with crime driven by many different factors, including poverty.

In contrast, Cape Town's crime occurs mainly in a small list of specific suburbs, and is driven predominantly by gangsterism. Thus, crime rates in South Africa's cities may be skewed significantly by the type, and location, of those crimes. Furthermore, for the average resident and visitor, the experience in terms of safety when traveling around a major city in South Africa is likely to vary greatly between cities.

To combat rises in crime rate, South Africa's urban areas have exploded the nation's security industry, with South Africa having over 2.7 million registered private security guards, which compares to just 150,000 public police officers for the entire nation. Since 2014, the number of private security business has grown by 43% and the number of private guards, by 44%. Services by private security companies includes ICCTV surveillance, urgent armed response to client security alerts, physical patrolling of neighborhoods, etc.

=== Townships ===
Most South African townships (informal settlements) are considered part of an urban area.

Townships were created in the 1950s and 1960s by the apartheid government and are periphery communities to larger, historically White-only urban areas. They were created to house exclusively populations of colour --- Black African, Indian, and Coloured citizens. While older, more established townships might have some middle-income enclaves, the majority of township populations live in poverty. In Khayelitsha, the largest township in Western Cape province, with over 400,000 residents, around 74% of households make only about R2300 (US$200) per month and the unemployment rate is 54%. There are no longer explicit legal restrictions on who can live in townships, even though, today, over 95% of township populations are not White.

Gangs in South Africa are most commonly found in the country's townships. In Cape Town alone, police estimate between 90 and 130 gangs, as well as over 100,000 gang members.

Gathering data on the proportion of South African crime as occurring in townships is difficult, however the townships are often considered to be the epicenters of violent and organized crime in the nation. Critics of the South African government often attribute South Africa's apartheid history to the dangerous conditions in many township areas. Commonly cited factors that contribute to the high crime rates are long-term unemployment (60% of the national unemployment rate resides in townships), disorganized and under-resourced policing, and widespread extreme poverty.

=== Rural Areas ===
Rural areas of South Africa experience, along with typical crimes, certain distinct crimes that have a profound impact on its citizens. Farm attacks, which are known often to divulge into other severe crimes, such as robbery, assault, or murder. In 2022, there were over 300 farm attacks in South Africa, ending in the murders of over 50 farmers.

The metrics are lesser than other crimes in the nation, though it has rural economic and community implications. Livestock theft resulting from farm attacks have consequences on the livelihoods of farmers and the efficiency of local farms. Livestock theft made up 1.38% of overall crimes in South Africa. Therefore, while urban crime is more prevalent, some argue that crimes like farm attacks and livestock theft are more consequential on the survival of farming businesses and their communities, because they have more immediate impact.

== Effects ==
=== Perceptions of safety ===
According to Statistics South Africa's 2025/26 Governance, Public Safety and Justice Survey, 80.7% of individuals aged 16 and older felt safe walking alone in their neighbourhood during the day, compared with 37.9% after dark. The proportion who reported taking measures to protect themselves against crime increased from 43.3% in 2024/25 to 46.6% in 2025/26.

=== Gated communities ===
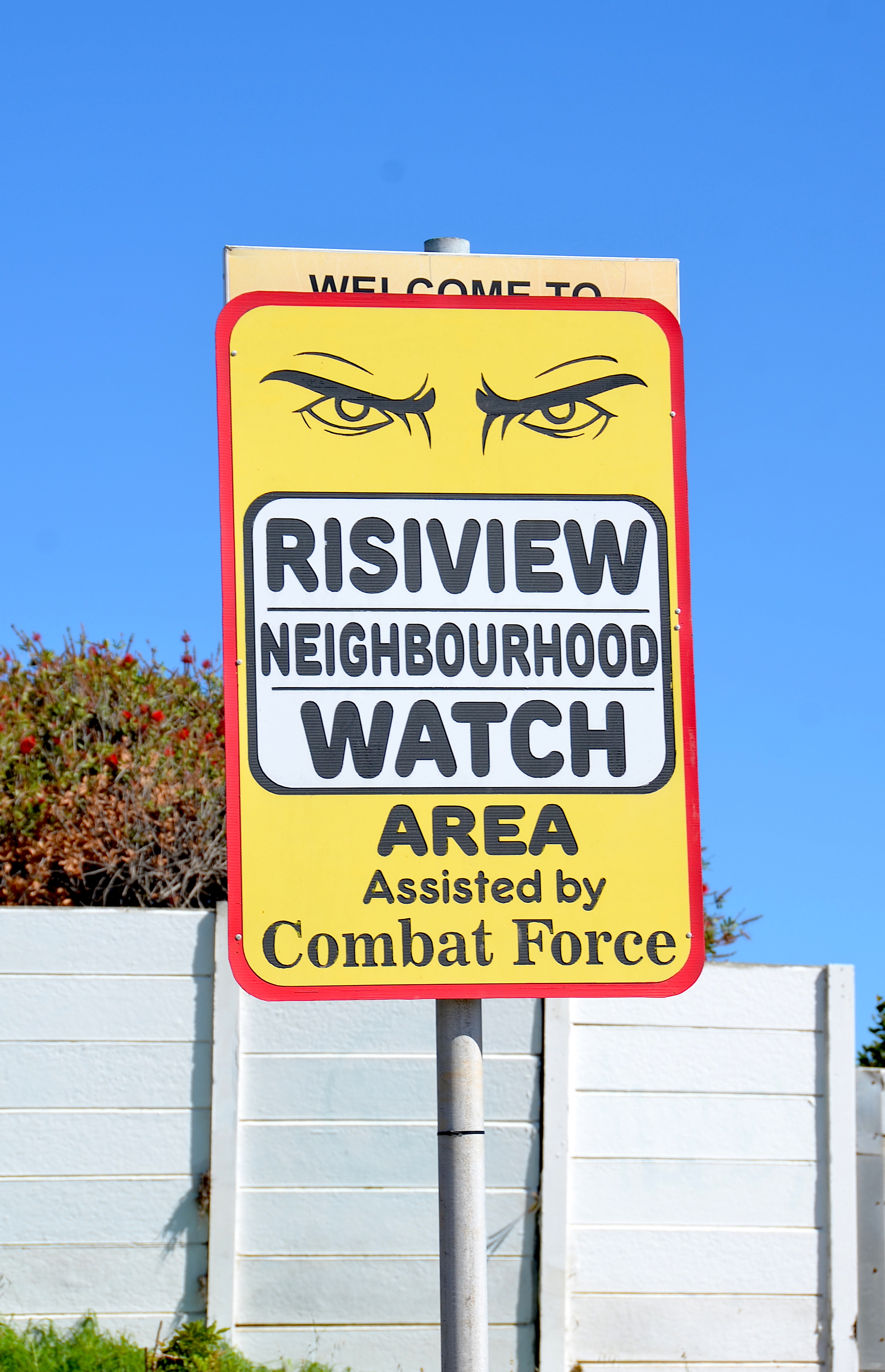
A neighbourhood watch sign on the Cape Peninsula

Gated communities are popular with the South African middle-class; Black as well as White. Gated communities are usually protected by high perimeter walls topped with electric fencing, guard dogs, barred doors and windows and alarm systems linked to private security forces.

The Gauteng Rationalisation of Local Government Affairs Act 10 of 1998, allows communities to "restrict" access to public roads in existing suburbs, under the supervision of the municipalities. The law requires that entry control measures within these communities should not deny anyone access. The Tshwane municipality failed to process many of the applications it has received, leaving many suburbs exposed to high levels of crime. Several communities successfully sued, won and are now legally restricting access.

These measures are generally considered effective in reducing local crime. Consequently, the number of enclosed neighbourhoods (i.e. existing neighbourhoods with controlled access to existing roads) in Gauteng has continued to grow.

=== Private security companies ===
The SAPS is responsible for managing 1,123 police stations across South Africa, and as of 2020 had 187,000 service members (down from 192,000 in 2019). By contrast South Africa had 450,000 private security guards in 2020 (and 470,000 in 2021), besides 1.5 million qualified "but inactive" private security personnel.

The SAPS has a strained relationship with private security companies, and warned them in 2021 that they must adhere to the law. Vetting of security guards was highlighted in 2021 when 182 guards appointed in 2018 by the city of Johannesburg were found to have former convictions for murder, rape, assault or theft.

To protect themselves and their assets, many businesses and middle-to-high-income households make use of privately owned security companies with armed security guards. The SAPS employ private security companies to patrol and safeguard certain police stations, thereby freeing fully trained police officers to perform their core function of preventing and fighting crime. A December 2008 BBC documentary, Law and Disorder in Johannesburg, examined such firms in the Johannesburg area, including the Bad Boyz security company.

It is argued that the police response is generally too slow and unreliable in South Africa, thus private security companies offer a more efficient form of protection. Private security firms promise response times of two to three minutes. Many levels of protection are offered, from suburban foot patrols to complete security checkpoints at entry points to homes.

== Reactions ==
The government has been criticised for doing too little to stop crime. Provincial legislators have stated that a lack of sufficient equipment has resulted in an ineffective and demoralised SAPS. The Government was subject to particular criticism at the time of the Minister of Safety and Security visit to Burundi, for the purpose of promoting peace and democracy, at a time of heightened crime in Gauteng. This spate included the murder of a significant number of people, including members of the SAPS, killed while on duty.

The criticism was followed by a ministerial announcement that the government would focus its efforts on mitigating the causes for the increase in crime by 30 December 2006. In one province alone, 19 police officers lost their lives in the first seven months of 2006.

In 2004, the government had a widely publicised gun amnesty program to reduce the number of weapons in private hands, resulting in 80,000 firearms being handed over. In 1996 or 1997, the government has tried and failed to adopt the National Crime Prevention Strategy, which aimed to prevent crime through reinforcing community structures and assisting individuals to get back into work.

A former Minister of Safety and Security, Charles Nqakula, evoked public outcry in June 2006 when he responded to opposition MPs in parliament who were not satisfied that enough was being done to counter crime, suggesting that MPs who complain about the country's crime rate should stop complaining and leave the country.

In November 2020, in response to the SAPS's poor logistics management, parliament's chairwoman for the portfolio committee on police, Tina Joemat-Pettersson, expressed the opinion that the country was only reacting to crime, without being proactive. Most emigrants from South Africa state that crime was a big factor in their decision to leave.

== See also ==
- Crime Expo South Africa
