= S v Maki =

In S v Maki, an important case in South African criminal law, the accused had consciously broken into the home of the deceased, an 84-year-old woman, and thereafter, in a drunken state, strangled her. He had previous convictions for possession of dagga, assault with intent to do grievous bodily harm, attempted rape and theft. He was sentenced to fifteen years' imprisonment. Jones J said,

The accused is not a youngster who, for the first time, had too much to drink and dabbled with dagga. On the contrary, he has a criminal record for violent acts and for involvement with dagga. Through his counsel he admits to longstanding serious substance abuse. His character is malformed. He lacks discipline. This sort of thing could happen G to him again. In a case such as this the interests of society must prevail over the interests of the individual offender.

As to the question of capacity, Jones J said the following:

It is perhaps worthwhile therefore to speculate on the possible sentences which would have been imposed or considered if the accused had killed the deceased with full criminal capacity. If he had had less liquor to drink and if he had been sufficiently in command of his faculties to be convicted of murder, his intake of alcohol might have been a mitigating factor. He might also have been able to point to other mitigating factors in explaining what happened inside the flat. But the many aggravating factors, which are self-evident, would have made the death penalty one of the options to be given serious consideration. If the Court had come to the conclusion that the death sentence was not the only proper sentence, the other options of imprisonment for life or imprisonment for a lengthy term of 20 or 25 years would have been considered. It is my view that it is extremely unlikely that a sentence of less than 20 years would have been imposed for this kind of murder.

== See also ==
- South African criminal law
