= R v Shelembe =

South African legal case

R v Shelembe is an important case in South African criminal law, heard in the Natal Provincial Division, by Selke AJP and Kennedy J, on August 22, 1955. DJH Niehaus appeared for the accused, at the request of the court; EA Logie appeared for the Crown. Judgment came down on August 30.

The case revolved around a charge of malicious injury to property, where the accused, endeavouring to escape from a room into which he had broken, broke in a two a locked door. Since the accused had also been charged and convicted of housebreaking with intent to commit a crime to the prosecutor unknown, the question arose: Was there a splitting of charges? The court held that breaking into a room and breaking out of it are two separate and distinct incidents. There had, therefore, not been a splitting of charges.

== Facts ==
The accused had been charged and convicted on two counts:

1. housebreaking with intent to commit a crime to the prosecutor unknown; and
2. malicious injury to property.

The evidence showed that he had broken into a room where there were a number of persons sleeping, and that, when they were aroused by his presence, the accused, apparently in an effort to escape, had broken in two the door, which had been locked.

== Judgment ==
On a review, the court held that the accused's conduct amounted to malicious injury to property, and that there had not been a splitting of charges, as the accused's breaking out was separate from the breaking-in in point of time and motive; they were separate and distinct incidents.

== See also ==
- South African criminal law
