= S v Mtewtwa =

South African legal case

- Court: Eastern Cape Division
- Full case name: S v Mtewtwa
- Argued: 24 March 1977
- Decided: 24 March 1977
- Citation: 1977 (3) SA 628 (E)

Court membership
- Judges sitting: Smalberger J, Stewart J

Case opinions
- Decision by: Stewart J

Keywords
- Criminal law, Liability, Defence of compulsion, Onus

S v Mtewtwa is an important case in South African criminal law, dealing with the defence of compulsion. The accused, in custody, was threatened by a warder with solitary confinement unless he committed a criminal act. The court considered what State must prove in such circumstances in order to obtain a conviction.

The court held that, where an accused's defence is one of compulsion, the onus lies on the State to show that a reasonable man would have resisted the compulsion. There is no onus on the accused to satisfy the court that he acted under compulsion.

Specifically, where a person is in custody and is threatened by a warder with solitary confinement, then, held the court, at the very least the State must show that the accused could reasonably have complained to the prison authorities of the warder's wrongful conduct and that such complaint would have averted the threatened confinement.

== See also ==
- South African criminal law
