= S v Lavhengwa =

South African legal case

In S v Lavhengwa, an important case in South African criminal law, it was held that the right created in section 35(3)(a) of the Constitution, which provides that the right to a fair trial includes the right to be informed of the charge with sufficient detail to answer it, implies that the criminal charge itself must be clear and unambiguous. This, according to the court, would only be the case if the nature of the crime is sufficiently clear and unambiguous to comply with the constitutional right to be sufficiently informed of the charge.

It was further held that, in order to comply with the requirement of sufficient clarity, one should bear in mind

- that absolute clarity is not required, reasonable clarity being sufficient; and
- that a court, in deciding whether a provision is clear or vague, should approach the legislation on the basis that it is dealing with reasonable people, not foolish or capricious ones.

== See also ==
- South African criminal law
