= S v Pretorius =

In S v Pretorius, an important case in South African criminal law, the accused had exceeded the speed limit when taking his child, whom he believed to be in mortal danger, to hospital for treatment. The court held that the onus of proof in a defence of necessity, as in self-defence, rests on the State, which must rule out the reasonable possibility of an act of necessity. It is not for the accused to satisfy the court that he acted from necessity. The conviction of Pretorius was accordingly set aside.

== See also ==
- South African criminal law
