= Welsh v Lawrence =

In the English case of Welsh v Lawrence (11 April 1818), the plaintiff's horse was killed by the defendant's cart. Its chainstay had broken, causing the defendant's horse to run away. "If the defendant is driving negligently as to the tackle," Bayley J said, "he is driving negligently." This case has been cited as authority on the issue of negligence, both in tort and in criminal law, in both England and South Africa.

== See also ==
- South African criminal law
