= S v Ingram =

Precedent in South African criminal law

In S v Ingram, an important case in South African criminal law, the appellant was a 25-year-old first offender who had stabbed the deceased once, in the heart. He expressed genuine remorse for his conduct. His sentence was altered on appeal to five years' imprisonment in terms of section 276(1)(i) of the Criminal Procedure Act.

== See also ==
- South African criminal law
