= S v Pietersen =

In S v Pietersen, an important case in South African criminal law, the accused had strangled a fellow inmate in a prison cell. He had ten previous convictions for crimes of violence. He was sentenced to seven years' imprisonment, two of which were suspended.

== See also ==
- South African criminal law
