= List of Streisand effect examples =

Incidents which have experienced a Streisand effect

This is a list of notable incidents that have experienced a Streisand effect, an unintended consequence of attempts to hide, remove, or censor information, where the effort instead backfires by increasing public awareness of the information. This list includes only instances explicitly identified by the media or other sources as examples of the Streisand effect.

== In politics and government ==
=== Argentina ===
In November 2024, an attempt led by Vice President Victoria Villarruel to ban certain books from schools for being "degrading and immoral" led to one such book, Cometierra, becoming a bestseller.

=== Australia ===
In March 2022, incumbent Australian federal MP Tim Wilson, in what had previously been considered to be the safe seat of Goldstein, drew national attention to his independent challenger Zoe Daniel when he made legal objections to posting of campaign signs by volunteers on the fences of private residences. This also led to a significant increase in donations to the Daniel campaign.

In December 2024, Rachael Gunn, Australia's Olympic breakdancer, attempted to legally suppress a comedy musical about her performance. Her legal threats were worked into a revised version of the show, which then played to larger audiences.

=== Canada ===
In December 2023, the Canadian Armed Forces at CFB Kingston sent a base-wide email addressing a sex worker advertising on base. The worker, who was essentially unknown to most soldiers at the time, became instantly recognizable as the email effectively advertised the woman and her services to the entire base. This situation was compounded after the story appeared in a number of national news outlets.

=== China ===
A 2018 study of millions of individual responses of Chinese social media users found that sudden censorship of information by the Chinese government and its affiliates often led to mass backlashes, including newfound popularity of virtual private networks and the subsequent reviewing of entire topic lists on which censored subjects appear. Other researchers found that the backlash tended to result in permanent changes to political attitudes and behaviors.

In August 2020, it was reported that the Chinese government had blanked out parts of Baidu's mapping platform, and that this could be used to find a network of buildings bearing hallmarks of prisons and re-education camps in Xinjiang.

On June 3, 2022, Chinese e-commerce livestreamer Li Jiaqi was interrupted for showing a tank-shaped ice cream cake in a livestream and failed to show up for the next scheduled show. This sudden suspension drew more attention to the sensitivity of the tank symbol on the eve of the 1989 Tiananmen Square protests and massacre; the interruption paradoxically triggered widespread online discussion and searches regarding "June 4th", increasing awareness of the suppressed history.

In January 2020, during the COVID-19 pandemic in China, the Jyllands-Posten newspaper received international attention when it published a cartoon depicting the Chinese flag with yellow virus-like figures instead of the usual yellow stars. The illustrator received numerous threats, and social media platforms were flooded by illustrations of the Danish flag that had been edited to included feces, texts like alle jeres familier døde ("all your families are dead") and similar mockery in what experts regarded as a coordinated action, much of it spread by newly started profiles that appeared to be automated. The Chinese embassy in Denmark demanded an official apology from Jyllands-Posten. Danish Prime Minister Mette Frederiksen refused to apologize on behalf of the Danish government, declaring that there is freedom of speech in Denmark. Other Danish newspapers, although some of them regarded the illustration as impolite, supported Jyllands-Posten, noting that Danish newspapers operate under Danish law, not based on intimidation from a non-democratic country, and also pointed out that few would have seen the illustration if not for the actions of the Chinese embassy.

When Hong Kong's secretary for justice filed an injunction to bar the distribution of pro-democracy protest song Glory to Hong Kong with the intention to incite secession, sedition, or to violate the national anthem law, Senior Counsel Abraham Chan said the government's injunction application "would bring about an own goal" by amplifying that which it sought to prohibit. Chan cited "empirical evidence" that after the government announced that it would apply for a ban, "the level of engagement with the song increased".

When Liu Xiaobo was awarded the 2010 Nobel Peace Prize for "his long and non-violent struggle for fundamental human rights in China", the Chinese Communist Party censored the news domestically, while publicly denouncing the Nobel Prize internationally. Most Western democracies, however, publicly praised the award and attended the awards ceremony despite pressure from Chinese diplomats.

When tennis star Peng Shuai disappeared after accusing Vice Premier Zhang Gaoli of raping her, the Chinese Communist Party's censorship of her story and subsequent staged public appearances of Peng drew increased worldwide scrutiny to her whereabouts and safety.

On June 10, 2025, the National Security Department of the Hong Kong Police Force issued a warning reminding citizens that downloading, sharing, recommending, or funding the mobile game *Reversed Front: Beacon Fire* could violate the Hong Kong national security law or the Safeguarding National Security Ordinance. This warning paradoxically led to a sharp increase in the game's popularity, with a significant rise in search and download volumes, gaining further public attention and recognition.

=== France ===
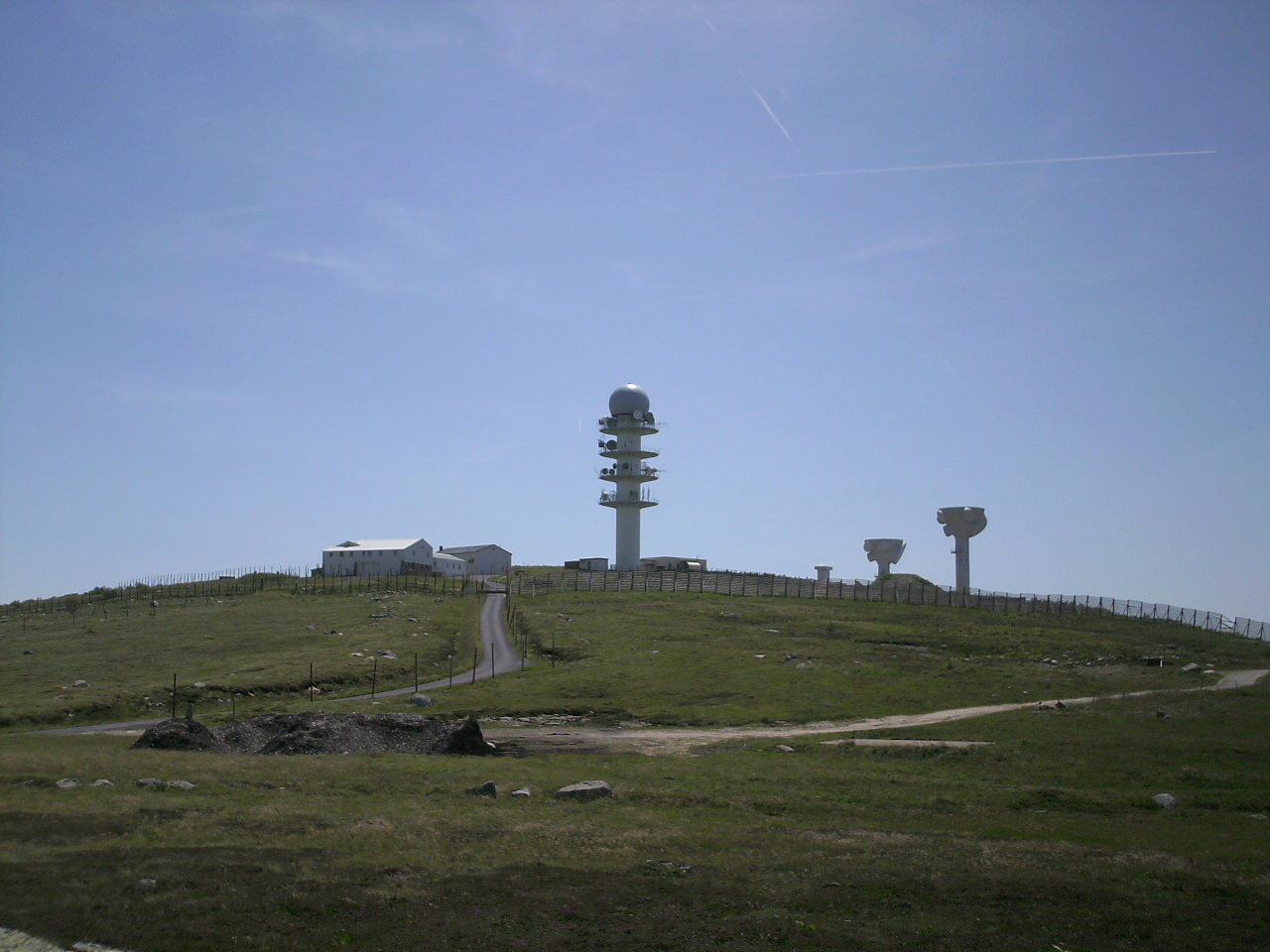
When the French intelligence agency DCRI tried to delete Wikipedia's article about the military radio station of Pierre-sur-Haute, the article became the French Wikipedia's most-viewed page.

The French intelligence agency DCRI's attempt to delete the French Wikipedia article about the military radio station of Pierre-sur-Haute resulted in the restored article temporarily becoming the most-viewed page on the French Wikipedia.

=== Greece ===
A 2013 libel suit by Greek politician Theodore Katsanevas against a Greek Wikipedia editor resulted in members of the project bringing the story to the attention of journalists.

=== Hungary ===
In 2020, Ákos Radnóti, a politician of Fidesz and then deputy mayor of Győr sued a resident of his city, identified only as Zoltán B., for a Facebook comment posted on a friend's personal profile page. In July 2020, one of B's friends shared a blog post accusing Radnóti of voter solicitation, under which B. commented "pay no attention to him, he's a dick". The deputy mayor sued B. for defamation, and B. was sentenced to three years of probation.

The case received wide media attention, in part because Radnóti's party has a poor reputation in the areas of free speech and other human rights, in part because the politician's lawyer was the same Zoltán Rákosfalvy who defended ex-mayor Zsolt Borkai during his sex and corruption scandal in the preceding year, and in part because B's sentence was seen as comparatively harsh (the trial happened the same month in which ex-diplomat Gábor Kaleta was sentenced to one year of probation and a monetary fine for owning thousands of child pornography photographs). Radnóti, who had previously been unknown outside his city, was widely criticised for being too sensitive and vindictive, and the outcome met disapproval from the general public, since politicians are public officials who are generally expected to endure criticism. Radnóti and the case was widely parodied online, with one popular blogger commenting that "he is more like a pussy" and paraphrasing a scene from Kafka's The Metamorphosis, with Radnóti being transformed into a penis. His Wikipedia page has been vandalized several times, with his profession being stated as "dick". A widespread joke stated that B. was in fact sentenced for releasing classified information.

B. appealed the sentence. As during the previous trial, he was defended by a lawyer of the Hungarian Civil Liberties Union, while Radnóti represented himself this time, to avoid further association with Rákosfalvy. In January 2021 B. was acquitted on the basis that the politician received the insult as a consequence of his acts as a public official, thus he has to endure criticism.

=== India ===
In February 2023, Prime Minister Narendra Modi of India sought to ban India: The Modi Question, a BBC documentary that was critical of him. This led to students in colleges across India screening the documentary on their own, on campus and elsewhere. Commentators argued that the ban had drawn more attention to the documentary than it would otherwise have received.

=== Israel ===
In May 2009, the Israeli right-wing nationalist political party Yisrael Beiteinu introduced a bill that would outlaw all commemorations of the expulsion of Palestinians following the 1948 Palestine war, known as "Nakba", with a three-year prison sentence for such acts of remembrance. The original bill did not pass, and the controversy surrounding it unintentionally promoted knowledge of the Nakba within Israeli society.

=== Saudi Arabia ===
A 2019 study of political imprisonment by the government of Saudi Arabia found that while incarceration tended to deter individual dissidents from further dissent, it strongly emboldened their social media followers, led to a sharp increase in calls for political reform, and resulted in an increase in online dissent and physical in-person protests overall, including criticism of the ruling family and calls for regime change. Such repression also draws public attention to the imprisoned dissidents and their causes, and does not deter other prominent figures in Saudi Arabia from continuing to dissent online.

=== South Africa ===
In 2017, the government of South Africa stated their intention to ban a book by Jacques Pauw, The President's Keepers, detailing corruption within the government of then-President Jacob Zuma. This resulted in sales of the book skyrocketing, and it sold out within 24 hours before the ban was to be put into effect. The book became a national bestseller and led to multiple reprints. This effect was repeated when Pauw published Our Poisoned Land (2023) and the Economic Freedom Fighters took legal action in an effort to ban the book, thereby resulting in an increase in book sales.

=== Sweden ===
In a royal letter from 1728, King Frederick did not want to ban writings that contemporaries perceived as blasphemous against Christianity since, according to previous experience, such a ban would arouse curiosity among the public to find out more about these writings.

=== Tunisia ===
In November 2007, Tunisia blocked access to YouTube and Dailymotion after material was posted depicting Tunisian political prisoners. Activists and their supporters then started to link the location of President Zine El Abidine Ben Ali's palace on Google Earth to videos about civil liberties in general. The Economist said this "turned a low-key human-rights story into a fashionable global campaign".

=== United Kingdom ===
On June 18, 2022, The Times reported claims that Boris Johnson had tried to hire his now-wife Carrie Symonds as his chief of staff when he was foreign secretary. Although it was published on its first printed edition, it was then swiftly removed without explanation. It was also mentioned on MailOnline, who rewrote the Times story in the early hours of the morning before also deleting its article without explanation or an editor's note. Rival newspaper The Guardian mentioned that this incident could backfire as an example of the Streisand effect. A few days later on June 21, 10 Downing Street said that the prime minister's special advisers asked The Times to retract the article, leading to questions about the objectivity of the editorship of the newspaper.

On January 19, 2024, British musician Brendan Kavanagh was livestreaming a performance on a public piano at London King's Cross station when he was harassed by a group of Chinese individuals claiming to be filming an undisclosed television program. They stated that since they had just been filmed by him, but did not want the unreleased program to be uploaded, they demanded the deletion of segments from his livestream. Although they attempted to suppress the dissemination of the footage, Kavanagh did not comply; the relevant video subsequently went viral on social media, garnering millions of views and widespread public attention.

On January 9, 2025, former Prime Minister Liz Truss sent a cease and desist letter to Prime Minister Keir Starmer demanding that he stop saying that she "crashed the economy", in reference to the aftermath of the September 2022 United Kingdom mini-budget which triggered the end of her premiership. The letter was then widely covered in the British media, drawing further attention to the claims that Truss had crashed the economy, which were repeated in parliament by Leader of the House of Commons Lucy Powell who stated "we won't cease and desist from telling the truth that they [the Conservatives] crashed the economy".

=== United States ===
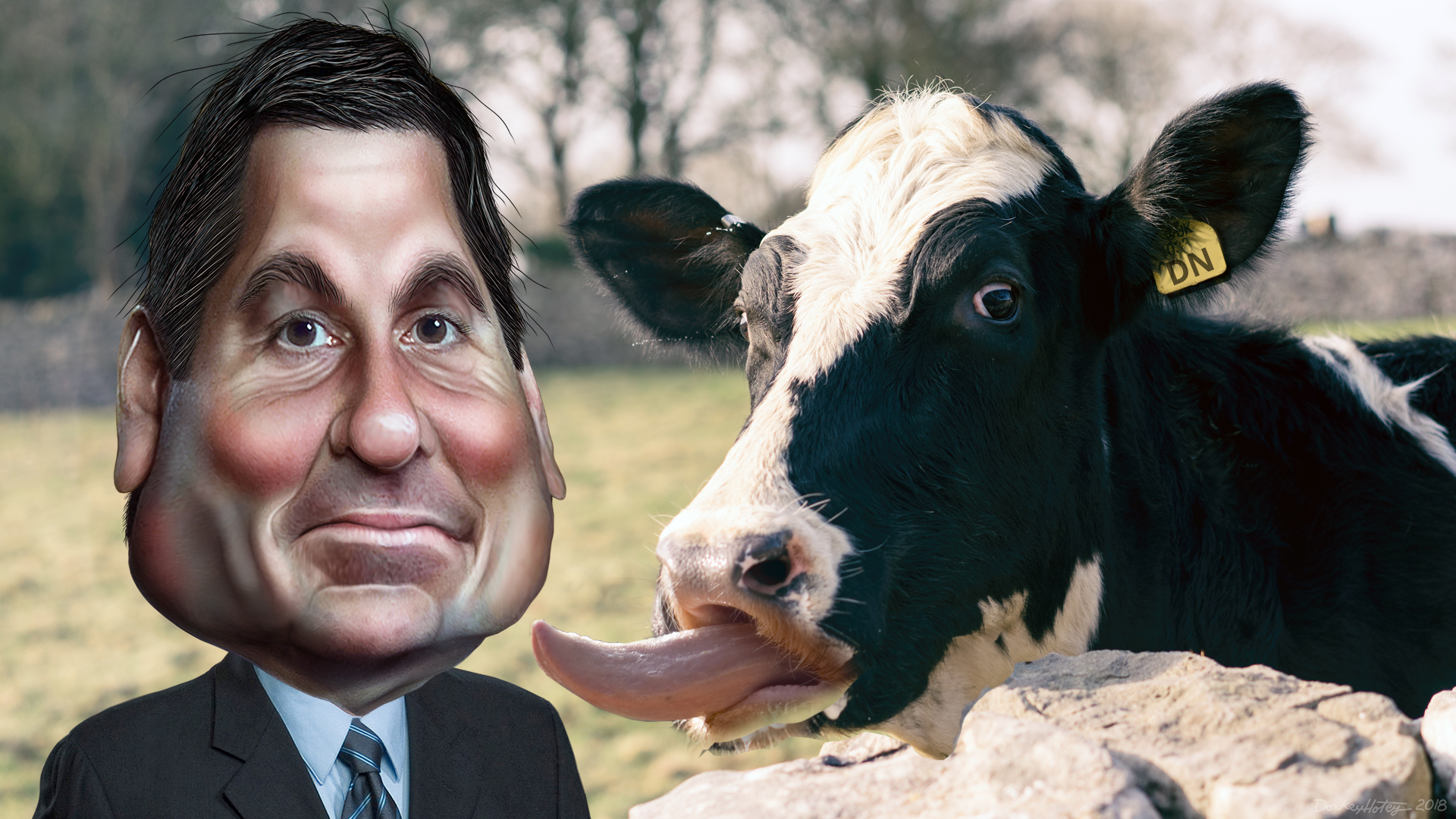
Caricature of Devin Nunes and a cow.

In March 2019, US Representative (R–California) Devin Nunes filed a defamation lawsuit against Twitter and three users for US$250 million in damages. One user named in the lawsuit, the parody account @DevinCow (Name: Devin Nunes' cow), had 1,200 followers before the lawsuit. After the suit, however, @DevinCow had gained some 600,000 additional followers.

In October 2020, the New York Post published emails from a laptop owned by Hunter Biden, the son of Democratic presidential nominee Joe Biden, detailing an alleged corruption scheme. After internal discussion that debated whether the story may have originated from Russian misinformation and propaganda, Twitter blocked the story from their platform and locked the accounts of those who shared a link to the article, including the New York Post's own Twitter account, and White House Press Secretary Kayleigh McEnany, among others. Researchers at MIT cited the increase of 5,500 shares every 15 minutes to about 10,000 shares shortly after Twitter censored the story, as evidence of the Streisand effect nearly doubling the attention the story received. Twitter removed the ban the following day.

Around the time that American politician JD Vance was nominated as the 2024 Republican vice presidential candidate, a July 15, 2024 Twitter post falsely said that Vance's memoir Hillbilly Elegy described him masturbating using a latex glove placed between couch cushions, leading to the creation of several Internet memes. This transparently false Internet hoax gained enough virality that the Associated Press published a fact check on July 24 to debunk it, but the agency removed the fact check from its website the next day saying it had not gone through the agency's "standard editing process". The removal itself became a news item, drawing more attention to the hoax, and it was described by The Daily Telegraph as an example of the Streisand effect.

On February 17, 2026, a Federal Communications Commission rule change led to the suppression of the interview with a Texas senatorial candidate James Talarico on the CBS The Late Show with Stephen Colbert. The interview was instead published on YouTube where it reached 3 million views in just 18 hours, compared to the show rating of 2.69 million viewers on average in the last quarter of 2025.

== By businesses ==
In April 2007, a group of companies that used Advanced Access Content System (AACS) encryption issued cease-and-desist letters demanding that the system's 128-bit (16-byte) numerical key (represented in hexadecimal as 09 F9 11 02 9D 74 E3 5B D8 41 56 C5 63 56 88 C0) be removed from several high-profile websites, including Digg. With the numerical key and some software, it was possible to decrypt the video content on HD-DVDs. This led to the key's proliferation across other sites and chat rooms in various formats, with one commentator describing it as having become "the most famous number on the Internet". Within a month, the key had been reprinted on over 280,000 pages, had been printed on T-shirts and tattoos, had been published as a book, and had appeared on YouTube in a song played over 45,000 times.

In September 2009, multi-national oil company Trafigura obtained a super-injunction to prevent The Guardian newspaper from reporting on an internal Trafigura investigation into the 2006 Ivory Coast toxic waste dump scandal. A super-injunction prevents reporting on even the existence of the injunction. Using parliamentary privilege, Labour MP Paul Farrelly referred to the super-injunction in a parliamentary question and on October 12, 2009, The Guardian reported that it had been gagged from reporting on the parliamentary question, in violation of the Bill of Rights 1689. Blogger Richard Wilson correctly identified the blocked question as referring to the Trafigura waste dump scandal, after which The Spectator suggested the same. Not long after, Trafigura began trending on Twitter, helped along by Stephen Fry's retweeting the story to his followers. Twitter users soon tracked down all details of the case, and by October 16, the super-injunction had been lifted and the report published.

In November 2012, Casey Movers, a Boston moving company, threatened to sue a woman in Hingham District Court for libel in response to a negative Yelp review. The woman's husband wrote a blog post about the situation, which was then picked up by Techdirt and Consumerist. By the end of the week, the company was reviewed by the Better Business Bureau, which later revoked its accreditation.

In December 2013, YouTube user ghostlyrich uploaded video proof that his Samsung Galaxy S4 battery had spontaneously caught fire. Samsung had demanded proof before honoring its warranty. Once Samsung learned of the YouTube video, it added additional conditions to its warranty, demanding ghostlyrich delete his YouTube video, promise not to upload similar material, officially absolve the company of all liability, waive his right to bring a lawsuit, and never make the terms of the agreement public. Samsung also demanded that a witness cosign the settlement proposal. When ghostlyrich shared Samsung's settlement proposal online, his original video drew 1.2 million views in one week.

In September 2018, The Verge, an American technology news and media network operated by Vox Media, published an article titled "How to Build a Custom PC for Editing, Gaming or Coding" and uploaded a video to YouTube titled "How we Built a $2000 Custom Gaming PC", which was widely criticized for its instructions that would have been harmful or dangerous to both the computer and user if followed, and its numerous factual errors, such as claiming anti-vibration pads were for electrical insulation, and confusing zip ties with tweezers. In February 2019, Vox Media started issuing Digital Millennium Copyright Act (DMCA) takedown notices to YouTube channels which posted content using clips from the video, most notably to technology channels Bitwit and ReviewTechUSA, bringing further attention to the video and the related content they attempted to suppress. After an outcry following the decision, YouTube reinstated these two videos, along with retracting the copyright "strikes" applied.

On February 20, 2020, Apple filed a legal complaint against the sales of the German-language book App Store Confidential, written by a former German App Store manager, Tom Sadowski. Apple cited confidential business information as the reason for requesting the sales ban. However, the publicity brought on by the media caused the book to reach number two on the Amazon bestseller list in Germany. The book was soon on its second print run.

In October 2020, the RIAA filed a DMCA takedown against the youtube-dl repository on GitHub, resulting in the repository and several forks being taken down. However, over 100 forks of the original repository appeared on GitHub in the days following the takedown request.

In May 2023, Nintendo issued a cease-and-desist notice against the Dolphin emulator appearing on Steam. As a result, Google searches of the emulator surged.

In November 2023, PR agency Mogul Press issued a DMCA takedown notice against a blog post by investigative journalist and tax lawyer Dan Neidle which contained commentary that was critical of their business practices. At the time of writing the resulting Twitter threads highlighting Mogul Press' actions have been viewed over 400,000 times (combined).

In March 2025, Meta won an arbitration ruling to prohibit ex-employee Sarah Wynn-Williams from promoting her book that criticized the company. This resulted in increased attention to the book.

On 8 December 2025, the Swiss online investigative news magazine Republik published a report in German that Palantir Technologies, an American surveillance-analytics company, had attempted to sell its service to various sectors in Swiss government over several years, but was rejected for non-necessity and as a likely breach of data sovereignty in the case of the military. In January 2026, Palantir responded by filing Swiss right of reply lawsuit against the magazine, resulting in the report being translated into English and publicized worldwide by European Federation of Journalists, Financial Times, Techdirt, and various other online outlets. The commercial court of Zurich dismissed Palantir's lawsuit in June 2026.

On December 21, 2025, CBS stopped an episode of 60 Minutes, Inside CECOT, from airing, postponing it to another day. It was alleged postponed owing to censorship and political interference. The episode would result in increased attention and would be shared widely online, in particular after it was aired via broadcast syndication in Canada.

In January 2026, Microsoft CEO Satya Nadella demanded that people stop calling artificial intelligence "slop" and instead accept AI as the "new equilibrium" of human nature. The public reaction instead made people double down on the backlash, and the term "Microslop" became popular on social media. In March 2026, several reports from the Microsoft Copilot Discord server found that the word "Microslop" was blacklisted. The term "Microslop" is used to describe discontent with Microsoft's practices, especially with the push of artificial intelligence features such as Copilot.

The Streisand effect was observed when YouTuber Reckless Ben published videos covering his investigation into a 2026 LEGO dispute. Bricks & Minifigs, the subject of the investigation, sued Reckless Ben and asked Patreon to remove the related content. These actions, as well Reckless Ben's interactions with police including a raid and an arrest, were documented in subsequent YouTube videos by Reckless Ben and other creators. The videos received millions of views, further increasing visibility of the dispute.

== By other organizations ==
In January 2008, The Church of Scientology's attempts to get Internet websites to delete a video of Tom Cruise speaking about Scientology resulted in the Project Chanology protests.

On December 5, 2008, the Internet Watch Foundation (IWF) added the English Wikipedia article about the 1976 Scorpions album Virgin Killer to a child pornography blacklist, considering the album's cover art "a potentially illegal indecent image of a child under the age of 18". The article quickly became one of the most popular pages on the site, and the publicity surrounding the IWF action resulted in the image being spread across other sites. The IWF was later reported on the BBC News website to have said "IWF's overriding objective is to minimise the availability of indecent images of children on the Internet, however, on this occasion our efforts have had the opposite effect". This effect was also noted by the IWF in its statement about the removal of the URL from the blacklist.

In June 2012, Argyll and Bute Council in Scotland banned a nine-year-old primary school pupil from updating her blog, NeverSeconds, with photos of lunchtime meals served in the school's canteen. The blog, which was already popular, started receiving a large number of views due to the international media furor that followed the ban. Within days, the council reversed its decision under immense public pressure and scrutiny. After the reversal of the ban, the blog became more popular than it was before.

In September 2022, after an upset loss to Appalachian State, clips of Texas A&M's Midnight Yell Practice started trending on the internet. The clips featured quotes including "What's [sic] are the best 4 years of an Appalachian State Mountaineers [sic] life? The third grade!" along with "I know for a fact that half their football team can barely read the name of their jerseys, let alone read a map." Texas A&M filed several DMCA strikes on several platforms of the clips online, however with the clips being continually taken down and reuploaded, the clips became even more popular.

Officials at Duke University raised objections to a scene in the HBO series The White Lotus in which Timothy Ratliff (played by Jason Isaacs) is wearing a Duke T-shirt as he puts a gun to his head to attempt suicide. A trademark expert told Front Office Sports that the university was creating a Streisand effect situation in doing so. Several days later, the scene took off as a meme when Duke’s men’s basketball team suffered a stunning defeat in the NCAA Final Four.

== By individuals ==
The Streisand effect has been observed in relation to the right to be forgotten, the right in some jurisdictions to have private information about a person removed from internet searches and other directories under some circumstances, as a litigant attempting to remove information from search engines risks the litigation itself being reported as valid, current news.

In May 2011, Premier League footballer Ryan Giggs sued Twitter after a user revealed that Giggs was the subject of an anonymous privacy injunction (informally referred to as a "super-injunction") that prevented the publication of details regarding an alleged affair with model and former Big Brother contestant Imogen Thomas. A blogger for the Forbes website observed that the British media, which were banned from breaking the terms of the injunction, had mocked the footballer for not understanding the effect. Dan Sabbagh from The Guardian subsequently posted a graph detailing—without naming the player—the number of references to the player's name against time, showing a large spike following the news that the player was seeking legal action.

Similar situations involving super-injunctions in England and Wales have occurred, one involving Jeremy Clarkson. Since January 2016 a celebrity (later revealed outside England and Wales to be David Furnish) used the injunction granted in PJS v News Group Newspapers to prevent media in England and Wales reporting events that have been featured in Scottish media and on the Internet.

In May 2016, Guns N' Roses singer Axl Rose sent a series of DMCA takedown notices to Google, in an attempt to suppress a 2010 image of him that was taken by a Winnipeg Free Press photographer and reposted by Gauntlet, under the headline "OMFG Axl Rose is Fat." This resulted in the "Fat Axl Rose" meme gaining a spike in popularity.

In 2018, Philippine Senate President Tito Sotto requested the Philippine Daily Inquirer to take down three of its online news articles published in 2014 that reported on the gang rape case of 15-year-old actress Pepsi Paloma in 1982. The articles stated that Sotto had intimidated Paloma to drop the case and used his political connections to influence the outcome of the rape case, of which his brother Vic Sotto was among the suspects involved. Tito Sotto alleged in his letter to the Inquirer that the articles "maliciously linked" him to the rape case and "negatively affected" his reputation "for the longest time". In response, links to the articles were mass-shared and archived into posts on Facebook and Twitter to preserve them and sparked renewed public interest into the Pepsi Paloma rape case. Eventually, a month after the request was made, the Inquirer complied with Sotto's request, with links to the former articles now redirecting to the Inquirer's home page.

A satirical play, Two Brothers and the Lions, was written by French playwright Hédi Tillette de Clermont-Tonnerre, about two wealthy British people who live in a castle on the Channel Island of Brecqhou, "who become cold, selfish monsters in the heart of our democratic societies". In reality the billionaire Barclay brothers, owners of the Daily Telegraph newspaper among other holdings, live in a castle on the island. David Barclay sued the playwright in France for defamation and invasion of privacy, though the Barclays were not named in the play. The playwright's lawyer described the play as "a satirical fable on capitalism". Tillette de Clermont-Tonnerre acknowledged that the play was partly inspired by the lives of the brothers. But he said it fell within his right to freedom of expression and said the play had been commissioned to explore the issue of the existence of mediaeval Norman law in the Channel Islands, while ruminating on the nature and future of capitalism. In July 2019 Barclay lost the case. The play had been obscure and only played in small theatres, though critically acclaimed; after the lawsuit performances were scheduled in cities across France.

News media reported about Fred Goodwin's extra-marital affair with a colleague at the Royal Bank of Scotland Group (RBS) where he previously was chief executive, so in response Goodwin filed a super-injunction to protect the identity of his former mistress.

Luke O'Neill, an Irish immunologist writing in The Guardian, opined that Bret Stephens, an American Pulitzer Prize-winning conservative journalist, in 2019 achieved "as close to the perfect Streisand effect as one could imagine." Stephens wrote an e-mail to David Karpf, an associate professor of media and public affairs at The George Washington University (GWU), whose tweet calling Stephens a "bedbug" had attracted insignificant interest, saying "I'm often amazed about the things supposedly decent people are prepared to say about other people — people they've never met — on Twitter. I think you've set a new standard." The journalist also cc'd on the e-mail the GWU provost, who later defended Karpf in an open letter posted on GWU's Twitter account. Karpf retaliated against Stephens, by posting the e-mail publicly on Twitter and by writing an op-ed criticizing him in the Los Angeles Times. Stephens was mocked on Twitter and deleted his account there, and the story was picked up by media.

In 2019 author Andrew Seidel sent a copy of his book The Founding Myth: Why Christian Nationalism Is Un-American to conservative evangelical pastor Greg Locke in the hope of starting a conversation about the issues discussed in it. Locke said that he had no intention of reading the book, and burnt it, posting video of the burning on his social media accounts. Response to the video included many replies expressing the intention to purchase and read the book, and to donate copies to libraries.

In November 2022, TV host Pablo Motos took offence in the wake of a Spanish Ministry of Equality TV promo that used an actor to play a male TV host asking a female guest about the kind of clothing she wore to sleep (echoing a similar situation involving Motos and actress Elsa Pataky in El Hormiguero), in order to denounce sexist attitudes women face on a daily basis. Motos invested 10 minutes of his show to criticise the promo and tell audiences that he is not machista (thus promoting, in prime time, an ad that presumably would have gone relatively unnoticed otherwise), Twitter users shared videos highlighting sexist attitudes by Motos in his show, Motos reportedly tried to take them down via copyright infringement notices from his production company, and they became viral.

In December 2022, Twitter CEO Elon Musk banned the Twitter account @elonjet, a bot that reported his private jet's movements based on public domain flight data. Musk had cited concerns about his personal privacy. The ban drew further media coverage and public attention to Musk's comments on allowing free speech across the Twitter platform. Musk received further criticism after banning several journalists who had referred to the "ElonJet" account or been critical of Musk in the past.

On 19 January 2024, a piano player Brenden Kavanagh, who films himself playing public and freely accessible pianos in London, was interrupted by a group of six holding Chinese flags, saying that he could not record their faces as they were for "Chinese TV". Kavanagh uploaded a clip of the encounter to YouTube, which has received 10 million views as of May 2024.

In March 2024, after an anti-fascist vigilante account on X (formerly Twitter) posted a thread and blog post allegedly exposing the identity of neo-Nazi cartoonist StoneToss, StoneToss made a tweet directly appealing Musk to remove the thread allegedly identifying him. Subsequently, the thread was removed and the account that posted it was suspended; the removal led to numerous users amplifying StoneToss's alleged identity, with many of these tweets, as well as links to the original poster's blog post, being removed and leading to some account suspensions. Commentators including Alejandra Caraballo, whose account was among those temporarily suspended for posting StoneToss's alleged identity, and Rob Beschizza in an article for Boing Boing, referred to the incident as an example of the Streisand effect. After the bans, X updated its privacy policy to include identifying anonymous users as a violation of its policies.

In March 2024, author J. K. Rowling was criticised for comments that denied that transgender people were targeted in Nazi Germany, which several users, including Jewish Novara Media journalist Rivkah Brown, described as Holocaust denial; Rowling replied specifically to Brown threatening litigation. Several weeks later, Brown deleted the criticism and issued an apology to Rowling, which caused the phrase "J.K. Rowling is a Holocaust denier" to become a trending topic on X, which Mira Fox of the Jewish newspaper The Forward compared directly to Streisand's lawsuit.

In March 2024, mining heiress Gina Rinehart asked the National Gallery of Australia that two different portraits by artist Vincent Namatjira be removed from public display, reportedly taking offense at her depiction in one portrait. Kyle Chalmers, an Australian competitive swimmer, who is sponsored by Gina Rinehart, also requested and commented publicly to have a portrait removed. The efforts to remove the paintings from public exhibition resulted in the portraits gaining international media attention.

In September 2026, the Kraft Group founder Robert Kraft forced Ed Sheeran to drop Macklemore from the Loop Tour after Macklemore decried Israel's war in Gaza, yelled "Free Palestine", played his protest song Hind's Hall, and said “To my Jewish brothers and sisters: Criticism of Israel, criticism of apartheid, being against genocide, in no way is a criticism of you." during the tour's shows at MetLife stadium in New Jersey. The attempt to silence Macklemore's political message by Kraft resulted in a sharp increase in views of Macklemore's speech. It also resulted in all supporting acts for the Loop Tour to withdraw in solidarity. After blowback, Ed Sheeran and Robert Kraft both agreed to donate $2,000,000 each to "Fight this humanitarian crisis" in Gaza.
