= Bejani Chauke =

South African politician and strategist

- Born: 16 June 1971 (age 55); Green Farm, Limpopo; South Africa
- Education: University of Limpopo
- Occupations: Politician; strategist
- Known for: CR17 campaign

Bejani Chauke (born 16 June 1971) is a South African political strategist and a member of South Africa's 7th parliament, who was the principal political advisor to the President of South Africa, Cyril Ramaphosa, from 2018. He is also known for managing the CR17 campaign that secured Ramaphosa's election as president of the African National Congress (ANC) at the ANC's 54th National Conference in December 2017. He was formerly a political advisor to Thandi Modise while she was Premier of the North West and Chairperson of the National Council of Provinces. In November 2022, the Financial Mail reported that Chauke had resigned as Ramaphosa's political advisor amid his campaign for election as ANC Treasurer-General at the party's 55th National Conference.

== Early life and career ==
Born on 16 June 1971, Chauke was born and raised in Green Farm near Malamulele in the northeast of what is now Limpopo province. In the 1990s, he studied political science at the University of Limpopo at Turfloop, where he became involved in politics. In 2022, he was studying for an MPhil in corporate strategy.

== Advisor to Thandi Modise ==
Chauke was formerly a political advisor to Maureen Modiselle, who was Premier of the North West in 2009 to 2010, and then to Thandi Modise. He was special advisor to Modise when she was North West Premier; he was installed in this position by the time of the Marikana massacre in August 2012. He followed her to the National Council of Provinces (NCOP), where she was NCOP Chairperson and he was her political advisor. He was advisor to Modise in 2014 when she was investigated on animal cruelty charges relating to her private farm in the North West; in 2019, he appeared as a witness in the case.

== CR17 campaign: 2015–2017 ==
Ahead of the 54th National Conference of the African National Congress (ANC) in December 2017, Chauke ran Deputy President Cyril Ramaphosa's successful campaign for election as ANC president. The Daily Maverick said that he was by then already "a long-time activist and ally of Ramaphosa's". He joined Ramaphosa's team at an early stage, heading "the logistics of the campaign" from September 2015 to May 2016. In August 2016, he was reportedly involved in securing the controversial involvement of businessman Cheslyn Mostert in the campaign; as Chauke urged that "things needed to move quickly" and operational infrastructure needed to be established, Mostert provided the campaign with a base on his smallholding at Randjesfontein on the Midrand.

In subsequent months Chauke was official national campaign manager, with oversight of all aspects of the campaign and responsibility for its ultimate success. Working above project manager Marion Sparg in the campaign's organisational hierarchy, he managed the campaign's team of organisers and fieldworkers and was the main channel of communication between the operational side of the campaign and its political committee. A source inside the campaign told the Daily Maverick that Chauke did not receive a salary from the campaign because he was on an official salary, presumably from Modise's NCOP office, where he remained an advisor in 2017.

== Advisor to the President: 2018–2022 ==
After incumbent President Jacob Zuma resigned in February 2018 and Ramaphosa was sworn in as President of South Africa, the Sowetan reported that Ramaphosa was expected to appoint Chauke to a position in his office in Pretoria's Union Buildings. On 1 August, Chauke was appointed political advisor in the Presidency on a contract linked to the President's term. His brief was reportedly to focus on the ANC's campaign in the 2019 general election. News24 said he was perceived as Ramaphosa's "right-hand man" and "fixer"; he has also been described as "a wily politician" and "a sharp and strategic mind". In 2022, the Daily Maverick reported that Ramaphosa was rumoured "not to make a move" without Chauke.

Chauke was reappointed political advisor in May 2019 when Ramaphosa won re-election to a full term as President. In subsequent years, he was also sometimes described as the President's Special Envoy as he acted as Ramaphosa's emissary on several occasions, including in August 2019, when he met with Saudi Foreign Minister Prince Faisal bin Farhan in Riyadh, Saudi Arabia; in October 2020, when he met with Congo President Denis Sassou Nguesso in Brazzaville, Republic of the Congo, about the African Union's involvement in the Libyan peace process; in June 2021, when he met with Chadian President Mahamat Déby in N'Djamena, Chad; and in September 2022, when he met with Sheikh Mohamed bin Zayed in Abu Dhabi in the United Arab Emirates. Ramaphosa also reportedly dispatched him at least thrice to Kinshasa to meet with the government of the Democratic Republic of Congo.

== ANC Treasurer-General bid: 2022 ==
In September 2022, ahead of the ANC's 55th National Conference, the Citizen reported that Chauke was a candidate for election as the Treasurer-General of the ANC, a full-time position based out of ANC headquarters at Luthuli House and one of the so-called Top Six slots on the party's National Executive Committee. Chauke would not confirm or deny that he intended to contest the position, saying, "I will wait for branches of the ANC to speak their minds on the matter. But if they nominate me, I will not disappoint."

When the ANC Electoral Committee published the consolidated nominations list on 22 November, Chauke emerged as the frontrunner for the Treasurer-General post, winning the nomination of 552 branches against Pule Mabe's 428 and Mzwandile Masina's 348. He was the favourite candidate of branches in Limpopo, North West, the Northern Cape, and the Western Cape. Chauke had not been endorsed by the leadership of any of the ANC's nine provinces and the media was surprised by his strong performance in the nominations phase. Masina, the former mayor of Ekurhuleni, derided Chauke as an "unknown" and said he had been nominated because he was "dishing money". However, Chauke accepted the nomination and subsequently premised his candidacy on strengthening the policy role of the Treasurer-General's office.

When the nominations list was released, the Financial Mail reported that Chauke had resigned from his position in the Presidency.

== Other positions ==
As of September 2022, Chauke was an official fundraiser for the ANC's O. R. Tambo School of Leadership and a member of the Circle of Advisors to the AfroChampions Initiative, a public-private partnership initiative of the African Union led by former Nigerian president Olusegun Obasanjo. At that time he was also the managing director of Acute Strategies, a consultancy firm which according to News24 regularly worked on election campaigns in African countries.

The Dr BF Chauke Foundation was incorporated in February 2019 and has been involved in humanitarian initiatives in Green Farm.

== Controversy ==
=== South African Airways sale ===
In October 2022, Chauke was implicated in an alleged corruption cover-up by Kgathatso Tlhakudi, who had been suspended as Director-General of the Department of Public Enterprises when he was himself implicated in corruption. Tlhakudi claimed that he had been "iced from his role" in the department after he alerted Chauke and Phindile Baleni, the Director-General in the Presidency, to allegations that Public Enterprises Minister Pravin Gordhan had been involved in improprieties related to the sale of the government's stake in South African Airways.

=== Connection to Hangwani Morgan Maumela ===
In October 2022, News24 reported that Chauke was an "associate" of Hangwani Morgan Maumela and that they were neighbours in a gated estate in Hyde Park, Johannesburg. Maumela was the nephew of Ramaphosa's ex-wife (though Ramaphosa denied having any further ties to him) and was linked to several contracts with Tembisa Hospital that were under investigation by the Special Investigating Unit as part of the unit's follow-up to Babita Deokaran's revelations of procurement corruption. Pointing to the News24 reports, the opposition Democratic Alliance called for further investigation of Maumela.

=== Phala Phala burglary ===
==== Alleged testimony by Wally Rhoode ====
Chauke was implicated in events surrounding "Farmgate", a burglary at Ramaphosa's Phala Phala farm in Bela-Bela, Limpopo in February 2020. During the burglary, which was made public by Arthur Fraser in 2022, a group of people, reportedly Namibian nationals, stole a large sum of dollars in cash. In July 2022, Mzilikazi wa Afrika reported for the Sunday Independent that the head of the Presidential Protection Service, Wally Rhoode, had told the Public Protector that Chauke had met Namibian President Hage Geingob to discuss the burglary. Rhoode allegedly said that he and Chauke, on Ramaphosa's instructions and with the South African National Police Commissioner's permission, had travelled to "no man's land" on the Namibian–South African border to meet with senior Namibian police officers; he said this meeting was on 25 June, while the Namibian police chief said a meeting occurred on 19 June and pertained to "operational information" shared between the two countries about the case. Rhoode also allegedly said that he and Chauke were flown in a Namibian state helicopter to Windhoek, where they spent the night at the Namibian state house and where Chauke met privately with Geingob the following morning. Geingob denied that this had occurred.

==== Submission by Bantu Holomisa ====
Ramaphosa had claimed that the cash stolen constituted proceeds from the sale of game or cattle from his farm. This was questioned in a submission by opposition politician Bantu Holomisa to a committee of the National Assembly. Holomisa submitted a letter that was believed to have been written by Fraser to assist the Hawks in their investigation into the burglary. According to the document, the foreign currency stolen at Phala Phala had been secretly and illegally smuggled into the country by Chauke on chartered flights from various countries, including Qatar, Saudi Arabia, Egypt, Morocco, and Equatorial Guinea. The document alleged that, once in South Africa, Chauke had hidden the cash in a sofa in his personal residence; the sofa had then been transported to Phala Phala before its theft in February 2020. It also alleged that after Fraser exposed the burglary in June 2022, Chauke transferred a further $20 million in cash to a property developer in Cape Town for "safekeeping". The document called for an investigation into the origins of the stolen cash, as well as for a lifestyle audit of Chauke personally because he "clearly enjoys a lavish lifestyle far beyond that to be expected of a presidential adviser". Chauke strongly denied the allegations and said they were part of an organised disinformation campaign that aimed to destabilise the ANC and obstruct Ramaphosa's re-election as ANC president.

==== Boy Mamabolo text message ====
In November 2022, various Independent Media newspapers reported that Boy Mamabolo, an ANC Member of Parliament, had "threatened" Sifiso Mahlangu, the editor of the Star, for his reporting about Chauke in connection with the Phala Phala burglary. Mambola allegedly sent Mahlangu a series of text messages in which he said that Mahlangu should stop reporting on Chauke because "I don't want Pple to Assassinate you. Bcos it can happen anytime from now [sic]".

=== Madlanga commission ===
On 27 October 2026 Chauke was issued with a summon to appear in the Madlanga Commission after his name was mentioned in WhatsApp chats.
