= Silenced (News24 series) =

South African investigative journalism series

Silenced: Why Babita Deokaran Was Murdered
- Author: Jeff Wicks; News24 Investigations Unit
- Original title: Silenced
- Language: English
- Subject: Government corruption
- Genre: Investigative journalism
- Publisher: News24
- Publication date: launched 2022
- Publication place: South Africa
- Media type: Online multimedia series
- Awards: National Press Club Merit Award (2022); Taco Kuiper Award for Investigative Journalism (2023)
- Website: specialprojects.news24.com/silenced

Silenced: Why Babita Deokaran Was Murdered is a South African investigative journalism series published by News24’s Investigations Unit. The series examines the circumstances surrounding the assassination of whistle-blower Babita Deokaran and the extensive corruption she uncovered in the procurement systems of the Gauteng's Department of Health and the Tembisa Hospital on the East Rand. As part of the series, the News24 team examined more than 60 000 emails, cell-phone data and internal documents to reconstruct what Deokaran had uncovered in the days before her death.

== Background ==
In August 2021, Babita Deokaran - a senior finance official in the Department of Health - was assassinated outside her home in Johannesburg after submitting a report flagging suspicious payments at Tembisa Hospital.

A feature-length documentary version of the series was premiered at a media screening in Johannesburg in April 2023 by News24.

The series was published in multiple parts under the “Silenced” banner on News24’s platform beginning in 2022. It included in-depth articles, data tables, downloadable documents, and later formed the basis for the documentary film. The journalist, Jeff Wicks, worked for more than a year analysing internal communications, procurement records and financial transactions.

The series revealed multiple layers of wrongdoing and the context surrounding Deokaran’s death, including how she had identified approximately R850 million in suspicious transactions flowing out of Tembisa Hospital. The News24 investigations found that after her appointment as the acting Chief Financial Officer at Tembisa Hospital, Deokaran had attempted to halt around R100 million in dodgy payments shortly before her murder.

Silenced also uncovered that:

- She flagged a network of at least 217 entities that may have benefited from inflated contracts, shell-companies and duplicate invoices.
- Among the flagged contracts were bizarre purchases inconsistent with a hospital’s needs - for example, a R500 000 contract for leather wingback chairs and a R500 000 contract for 200 pairs of children’s skinny jeans.

The series linked the procurement irregularities to powerful syndicates, politically connected individuals, and what it termed a “tender mafia” operating within the health-department ecosystem. News24 journalist Jeff Wicks state that Deokaran’s warnings - building in a WhatsApp message that “our lives could be in danger” - were ignored and that the departmental leadership failed to act on her report.

The News24’s Investigations Team received awards for the Silenced series, including the National Press Club Merit Award (2022) and the Taco Kuiper Award for Investigative Journalism (2023).
