= 2020 Phala Phala robbery =

South African crime

- Date: 9 February 2020
- Location: Phala Phala private game farm
- Motive: Burglary
- Outcome: Indeterminate amount of money stolen

The 2020 Phala Phala Robbery or Cyril Ramaphosa Farm Burglary or Farmgate Scandal was a burglary of South African President Cyril Ramaphosa's private Phala Phala game farm near Bela-Bela, Limpopo, South Africa. The incident occurred on 9 February 2020 in which an indeterminate amount of cash was stolen. Two perpetrators were later convicted over the burglary in 2026. Arthur Fraser, an ally of former president Jacob Zuma alleged that around 4 million US dollars (60 million rand) of undeclared foreign currency had been stolen. However, subsequent reports indicated that the amount stolen was $580 000. Ramaphosa denied any wrongdoing, and sought judicial review of a report by a panel appointed by the South African Parliament released in 2022 that accused him of "serious misconduct". Opposition parties and MPs have slammed investigations into the source of the cash, and have accused the South African Reserve Bank of providing a claptrap report and systemic coverup. The Democratic Alliance intends to pursue the courts to further investigate the matter.

== Context ==
On 1 June 2022, former head of the State Security Agency and close ally of former president Jacob Zuma, Arthur Fraser, lodged a criminal complaint against Cyril Ramaphosa for defeating the ends of justice by committing breaches of the Prevention of Organised Crime Act and the Prevention of Corrupt Activities Act of 2004. Fraser's complaint stated that a total of US$4 million (equivalent to R62 million) stashed inside a couch at Ramaphosa's home at the Phala Phala game farm in Waterberg, Limpopo was stolen “on or about” 9 February 2020. It went on to state that the president did not report the crime and that the existence of such a large amount of foreign currency was not declared to the reserve bank despite regulations. Fraser's complaint also alleged that suspects supposedly involved in the theft were kidnapped and interrogated at the farm and were paid off not to tell anyone of the incident. The Namibian authorities identified suspects involved in the theft before it became public but allegedly let the matter go following requests from South African state security sources.

Sources close to the president stated that whilst a theft did take place at the farm the amount of money involved was less than Fraser had claimed and the money was all legally obtained following the sale of Ankole cattle. Ramaphosa stated that he did not report the crime as he did not want to cause alarm within the farming community and instead the presidential security detail investigated the theft.

== 2020 burglary ==
From the allegation and charges laid by Arthur Fraser, the following events allegedly took place: A domestic worker employed at the Phala Phala game farm had allegedly discovered foreign currency hidden in furniture. She lived off the farm in the village of Cyferskyl. Many Namibians live there and their origin were from persons who had fought on the side of the South African Defence Force during the Border War and settled in South Africa after 1989. She discussed the find with some neighbours and they put her in touch with some Namibians, who could help her, and were based in Cape Town. The burglary occurred on the night of 9 February 2020, around 10 pm. Fraser claimed the whole event was recorded on CCTV. The burglars initially broke into the wrong room and were then allegedly assisted by the domestic worker to the right room. After the burglary, they then fled to Cape Town. When the burglary was discovered, the head of the Presidential Protection Unit Major-General Wally Rhoode allegedly became involved, instructed to investigate by Cyril Ramaphosa. Suspects were eventually traced to Cape Town after the domestic worker was interrogated and her cell phone examined for messages with the burglars. In Cape Town, the burglars laundered the foreign currency into Rands at a Chinese money exchange. Fraser claims the suspects were interrogated, any money left over returned and the burglars paid-off with R150 000. At least one was allegedly interrogated while in Namibia by Rhoode. This occurred due to the alleged intervention of Ramaphosa with Namibian President Hage Geingob. The domestic worker was allegedly fired then reinstated and paid off with $150 000.

=== Burglary suspects ===
The following alleged suspects were identified from the charges laid by Arthur Fraser with the police. The suspects that have been interviewed by journalists have claimed they are innocent.

- Immanuwela David - Allegedly illegally entered Namibia in June 2020 with the bribery of Namibian government officials. He was arrested two days later in Windhoek, charged with entering Namibia illegally and breaking the country's COVID-19 lockdown rules. He spent four months in jail before appearing in court on 13 November 2020. He then pleaded guilty to illegally entering the country and failing to declare goods he had brought into Namibia. He was sentenced to a year in jail for the former and 24 months for the latter crime and had to forfeit the cash, watches and jewellery. He served only 48 hours and was deported to South Africa. David was one of two suspects later found guilty of the crime.
- Urbanus Shaumbwako - Namibian citizen, arrested in October 2020, in possession of unlicensed firearms. The firearms had been used in robberies. He is due in court in July 2022. He was caught at a roadblock outside Cape Town, with 12 unlicensed firearms, serial numbers erased believed to Namibian police weapons, while in a car belonging to Erkki Shikongo.
- Erkki Shikongo - He admitted to journalists that he smuggled gold, guns and dollars between Namibia, Angola and South Africa. He said he knows the suspects named except Afrikaner. Claimed Petrus Muhekeni is his "brother". He also said he knows Immanuwela David from Cape Town. Shikongo lived in the same house Cape Town with Urbanus Shaumbwako. Denies knowing anything about the Phala Phala robbery.
- Petrus Muhekeni - He denied he was involved in the robbery. Claimed no police had spoken to him about the event. He is now in Namibia recovering from a broken neck from a house fall. He was an Uber and Bolt driver in Cape Town.
- Petrus Afrikaner - No known information. Erkki Shikongo claimed he does not know him.

== 2022 Timeline ==
On 1 June, former Director-general of the State Security Agency and Department of Correctional Services commissioner Arthur Fraser and his lawyer attended the Rosebank Police Station and laid a charge of money laundering, defeating the ends of justice and kidnapping against President Cyril Ramaphosa. He presented evidence to support his allegations that included names, photographs, video footage of the robbery, and bank accounts. He alleged that $4 million in foreign currency was stolen from a concealed location at the president's game farm, Phala Phala, on 9 February 2022. He alleged the burglars were then identified, kidnapped, interrogated and then bribed to hide the implications of the undeclared foreign currency from the South African Police Service and South African Revenue Service The allegation was laid under section 34(2) of the Prevention and Combatting Corrupt Activities Act, which states that it is an offence not to report alleged crimes related to the act.

A spokesperson for the presidency, Vincent Magwenya, confirmed on 2 June 2022 that, during the burglary that occurred at the president's farm in 2020, around $4 million was stolen and that Ramaphosa denied any criminal conduct. The spokesman question the timing of Fraser's disclosure two years later. Magwenya confirmed that the theft was reported to the head of the Presidential Protection Unit of the South African Police.

By 3 June 2022, Democratic Alliance leader John Steenhuisen said that his party would be writing to the South African Revenue Service (SARS) calling for the organisation to investigate whether the money had been declared and tax paid. They would also write to South African Reserve Bank (SARB) asking them to investigate whether the foreign exchange held by Ramaphosa was the result of an illicit flow of funds and whether money laundering was involved.

On Sunday 5 June 2022, Ramaphosa, at his closing address of the ANC Limpopo provincial conference, claimed there was a political agenda around the disclosure that he had hidden the theft of money from his game park and that the amount of money was far less than had been reported. He claimed the money came from selling game animals and he had not stolen money nor was it a case of money laundering.

Monday, 6 June 2022, saw ANC National Executive Committee (NEC) member Tony Yengeni, a Jacob Zuma supporter, have the National Working Committee (NWC) meeting agenda modified to include a discussion about the brewing scandal. He attempted to force the committee to make Ramaphosa step down while he was investigated by the ANC's integrity committee. He also attempted to get the president to face parliament's ethics committee. The attempt failed to unseat the president and the NWC accepted a report from Ramaphosa and would wait for the investigation to take its course before making a decision.

United Democratic Movement leader Bantu Holomisa wrote to the parliamentary speaker on 7 June 2022 requesting that parliament investigate the allegations using a panel of retired judges, and that president should step down during the process and allow the vice-president David Mabuza to assume the role.

On 7 June, the Economic Freedom Fighters (EFF) released a video supposedly of the robbery at Phala Phala game farm. EFF leader Julius Malema called for Ramaphosa to step aside while the police investigate. He promised to mobilise the public to stop recognising his right to be president if he failed to step aside. Malema also claimed the police were being pressured to change dates on official documents to back the president's claims that the Presidential Protection Unit had opened a case. After the purported footage was released, the EFF laid allegations of money laundering with Ramaphosa denying the allegations.

Public Protector Advocate Busisiwe Mkhwebane announced on 8 June 2022 that she would be investigating Ramaphosa for criminal activities after receiving a complaint from African Transformation Movement MP and president Vuyo Zungula concerning allegations of bribery, concealing crimes and kidnapping at the president's farm.

The following day, 9 June 2022, Public Protector Advocate Busisiwe Mkhwebane was suspended by Ramaphosa. Her suspension came, after weeks earlier, Ramaphosa had requested her to report back to him as to why he should not suspend her. This she had done on 27 May 2022. Her suspension would in no way hinder the deputy public protector from investigating the president.

Ramaphosa stated on 10 June 2022, that he would step aside if he was charged over the events that followed after money was stolen from his game park by burglars. He also announced that he had volunteered to appear before the ANC Integrity Commission.

On 13 June 2022, ex-ANC spokesperson and Jacob Zuma supporter, Carl Niehaus opened a case of money laundering and kidnapping, at a police station, against Ramaphosa. He said the president should be held accountable for his crimes and the opening of a case against the latter should become a national campaign and encourage South Africans to do the same. On the same day, the Hawks confirmed that a group of investigators had been appointed to investigate.

ATM leader Vuyo Zungula tabled an official motion on 14 June 2022 that parliament investigate Ramaphosa by forming a Section 89 Committee Inquiry over allegations the latter had violated section 89 of the South African Constitution.

On 15 June 2022, the Hawks investigators met Arthur Fraser and discussed his allegations, provided additional information and he received an update on the case's progress.

Namibian Police Inspector-General Sebastian Ndeitunga alleged that after the arrest of Imanuwela David on 12 June 2020, Namibian police met South African police on 19 June 2020 in Noordoewer, ǁKaras Region to discuss the arrest and the proceeds that had been obtained from the crime in South Africa. He also refuted any allegations of torture alleged by Fraiser in his affidavit. Police Minister Bheki Cele denied any knowledge of the meeting. The South African National Defence Force (SADF) had also denied allegations that David had been a member of its organisation, an allegation also made by Namibian police. Home Affairs also refused to confirm David's citizenship.

South African Justice and Correctional Services spokesperson Chrispin Phiri said on 21 June that no request had been received from the Namibians, something the Namibians said they had done, in order to confirm whether a crime had been registered in South Africa in relation to the alleged suspects and money flow into Namibia so that a preservation order could be issued.

DA leader John Steenhuisen said on 21 June, that the DA had written to Federal Bureau of Investigation (FBI) to request that they investigate allegations of possible money laundering. They wanted the source of the funds investigated, whether it was brought into the country legitimately. The DA also wrote to the South African Revenue Service and the Financial Intelligence Centre requesting they investigate potential crimes.

The Sunday Independent newspaper alleged in late June 2022, that sixteen members of special task force were deployed to investigate the money theft and budgeted out of a secret crime intelligence account. Three months after the theft, it was alleged the unit was reduced to eight after General Sam Setlhabaneing complained that money was being spent on an operation he knew nothing about. Eventually the task force was disbanded. Other allegations were made that a cell phone interception device was used to track the alleged burglars to Cape Town. They were raided under the pretext of a drug dealing. It was also alleged some of the stolen money was found and that alleged burglars were then bribed to maintain their silence.

Deputy Public Protector, Advocate Kholeka Gcaleka requested 31 answers to the questions she had sent to Ramaphosa. The deadline was set as 22 June 2022 but he did not meet the deadline and Gcaleka gave him and extension. This extension had not been disclosed publicly. She later defended her decision saying it was based on the amount of information required and all extensions were based on merit and maintained her independence and impartiality.

In July Speaker of the National Assembly, Nosiviwe Mapisa-Nqakula declined to proceed with Democratic Alliance's request for parliament to set up an ad hoc committee and the same with the ATM party's request for an impeachment of the president.

On 16 July, the National Commissioner of SAPS General Sehlahle Fannie Masemola announced that Lieutenant General Sam Shitlabane had taken command of Presidential Protection Service (PPS) replacing Major-Gen Wally Rhoode.

On 18 July 2022, Ramaphosa missed the deadline to answer thirty-one questions put to him by the Office of the Public Protector after it had been extended on 22 June and a further request for an extension was asked for and denied. But on 23 July, Ramaphosa responded to the Office of the Public Protector's thirty-one questions.

In July, despite many requests from opposition parties, the Department of Home Affairs refused to confirm Immanuela David's nationality on the grounds of privacy laws which required the latter to consent to its release.

On 25 July, The Sunday Independent published Presidential Protection Service General Wally Rhoode's alleged responses to questions put to him by the Public Protector. He had allegedly confirmed that he had driven to Namibia with Ramaphosa's adviser, Bejani Chauke. They met Namibian police and were flown to Windhoek by helicopter arranged by Namibian President Hage Geingob. This was denied by Geingob's spokesperson. Other allegations made by the newspaper were that the Namibians had become involved after the alleged robbers had been arrested, interrogated, paid off and released in South Africa at the end of March 2020. At least two of the robbers had then entered Namibia, one illegally. The former, Erkki Shikongo, was arrested prior to the Namibian meeting, when Namibian police were investigating money transfers and Immanuwela David was arrested in June 2020 after crossing illegally, bribery and in possession of luxury goods and cash.

It was also alleged in Rhoode's statement to the public protector, that he blamed the late Deputy Commissioner Sindile Mfazi for not implementing a proper investigation of the robbery. Four police generals called Rhoode a "shameless liar" and that he had never reported the robbery nor that the former national police commissioner authorised Rhoode's trip to Namibia.

At the end of July, Police Commissioner Fannie Masemola stated in an affidavit that no case of theft was ever reported by Ramaphosa. He also stated that the theft took place on 10 February 2020 and was only reported on 2 March 2020 to the then head of protection services Major-General Wally Rhoode.

The Independent Police Investigative Directorate (IPID) announced on 2 August it would investigate the conduct of the police officers involved in the Phala Phala robbery in regard to police regulations while the Hawks would continue to investigate possible criminal police conduct. ATM president Vuyo Zungula had written to the directorate in late June asking them to investigate the matter and again July.

On August 5, Speaker Nosiviwe Mapisa-Nqakula notified the ATM that its motion for an independent panel to investigate allegation that could lead to the possible impeachment of the president, complied with the Constitution, rules and established practices and independent panel would be appointed.

In late August 2022, Hawks head General Godfrey Lebeya, in a media briefing on other matters said that the Phala Phala investigation was still ongoing and that 41 statements had been obtained so far.

South African Reserve Bank (SARB) Governor Lesetja Kganyago replied by letter on 30 August 2022 to opposition parties after they requested an update of the bank's progress in investigating the Phala Phala allegations. He said the Financial Surveillance Department (FSD) had communicated with the president and his advisers on 20 June 2022 and were given 21 days to respond with another 15 days extension granted. He said the department had been given information, but further questions had been sent to the president and his advisers with deadline of 8 September 2022.

On 14 September 2022, Speaker Nosiviwe Mapisa-Nqakula appointed a three-person panel, consisting of former chief Justice Sandile Ngcobo, Judge Thokozile Masipa and Professor Richard Calland to investigate if there was prima facie evidence of criminal activity at Phala Phala farm that could result in the parliamentary impeachment of Ramaphosa. The panel was to take submissions from MP's and was given 30 days to report back to the speaker. Professor Richard Calland's independence was immediately called into question by opposition MP's stating he had made statements of support for the President in the past. On 27 September, Mapisa-Nqakula announced advocate Mahlape Sello would replace Calland after having considered written submissions and legal opinions regarding the appointment of Calland. Known as the Section 89 panel, it started hearing submissions on 19 October 2022.

Ramaphosa had until 6 November 2022, to respond to the Section 89 panel about allegations made to the panel by MPs. On 7 November, former Chief Justice Sandile Ngcobo, chairman of the Section 89 panel confirmed that President Ramaphosa had replied to the MPs allegation that had been presented to the panel. The report was due on 17 November 2022.

ANC NEC met mid-November to discuss reports prior to its December conference when a new president would be chosen. It was said the NEC would be presented with the ANC's integrity committee statement about the Phala Phala matter. Leaked information from the meeting of the NEC claimed Ramaphosa got to present his version of the incident and was said to have revealed that only $480 000 (about R8.28 million) was stolen instead of the $4 million, was tax-compliant, and that he had identified to the authorities the names of those who had bought the cattle. It was said that some members called for him to step down at the meeting and others defended him. ANC treasurer-general Paul Mashatile claimed after the NEC meeting that integrity committee had submitted a report but was still working on the report related to Phala Phala. The ANC's Integrity Commission put out a statement in mid-November deny reports of claims in the media of the circulation of a leaked progress update on the Phala Phala robbery. It claimed no such report has been released.

ATM President Vuyolwethu Zungula threatened judges in the panel that is probing Ramaphosa with impeachment if they tried to protect the president. Legal expert advocate Thulezwile Ndawo said ATM would not be able to impeach the panel or take the report under judicial review.

On 16 November retired Chief Justice Sandile Ngcobo, chairperson of the three-member panel of experts mandated by the speaker Mapisa-Nqakula to determine if Ramaphosa has a prima facie case to answer concerning Phala Phala robbery, was given an extension until November 30 to submit their report. Several opposition parties described the deadline extension as a delaying tactic and was unacceptable.

As the Parliament was due to go into recess on December 1, this concerned opposition MPs as the feared the panel's report would only be tabled before Parliament in February 2023. The National Assembly programming committee meeting said on 17 November, that a sitting would be arranged for December 6 for the Section 89 report to be considered and distributed to MPs prior to the sitting.

Speaker of Parliament Nosiviwe Mapisa-Nqakula received the Phala Phala report from former Chief Justice Sandile Ngcobo, chairman of the Section 89 panel, on 30 November 2022. She said the Phala Phala report would be handed to the parliament's Announcements, Tablings and Committees (ATC) and was used by parliament to publish documents which are sent out to MPs, media and other stakeholders.

The report from the Section 89 panel was released to the public on the evening of 30 November 2022 and concluded, the following statement after receiving submissions from the EFF, UDM and ATM and Ramaphosa, that:

“In light of all the information placed before the Panel, we conclude that this information discloses, prima facie, that the President may have committed:

- A serious violation of sections 96(2)(a).
- A serious violation of section 34(1) of PRECCA.
- A serious misconduct in that the President violated section 96(2)(b) by acting in a way that is inconsistent with his office.
- A serious misconduct in that the President violated section 96(2)(b) by exposing himself to a situation involving a conflict between his official responsibilities and his private business of the Constitution."

Local media reported that Ramaphosa wished to resign in the wake of the report, however Ramaphosa revised his position, pending a meeting of the ANC's NEC. The uncertainty around Ramaphosa's position caused South Africa's currency and bond markets to fall.

The South African parliament met on 13 December 2022 to debate the Section 89 panel's report and vote on impeachment proceedings. A vote was taken after the debate to impeach the president which failed to pass after the ANC members voted against impeachment it while the opposition parties and a handful of ANC members voted for it. 214 members voted against setting up an impeachment committee, 148 voted in favour and there were two abstentions.

Prior to the vote, Ramaphosa applied to the Constitutional Court to have the Section 89 panel's report declared unlawful and invalid. Hazim Mustafa, the Sudanese businessman residing in the United Arab Emirates corroborated Ramaphosa's version of events in December 2022 interviews with The Guardian and Sky News, stating that he was unaware that Ramaphosa owned the farm, and that he had paid $580,000 cash to Ramaphosa's staff for a rare cattle breed to add to his collection of exotic animals.

Ramaphosa was re-elected for another five-year term as ANC president at the party's December 2022 elective conference.

== 2026 Timeline ==
On 08 May 2026, the Constitutional Court found that Parliament acted unlawfully and unconstitutionally in 2022 when it voted to stop an impeachment inquiry into the Phala Phala scandal. The court ruled that the National Assembly improperly rejected the findings of the independent Section 89 panel without properly carrying out its constitutional duty to hold the President accountable.

In November 2026, two suspects – Imanuwela David and Froliana Joseph, a cleaner at the property – were found guilty of the burglary. A third defendant, Joseph's brother, was found not guilty.

== See also ==
- Cyril Ramaphosa
- 2021 Zuma protests
