= Jeff Wicks =

South African investigative journalist

- Born: Durban, South Africa
- Education: Howick High School
- Occupation: Investigative journalist
- Years active: 2000s–present
- Employer: News24
- Known for: The Shadow State: Why Babita Deokaran Had to Die
- Awards: Nat Nakasa Award (2024); Taco Kuiper Award for Investigative Journalism (2020, 2022); Vodacom Journalist of the Year Awards (2023, 2025)

Jeff Wicks is a South African investigative journalist with the online news outlet News24. He has reported on corruption, organised crime and police accountability. He is best known for his News24 work Silenced, a series exposing the circumstances that led to the assassination of whistleblower Babita Deokaran in Johannesburg on 23 August 2021. He is also the author of the book The Shadow State: Why Babita Deokaran Had to Die.

He has led and contributed to investigations into the assassination of Anti-Gang Unit detective Charl Kinnear, alleged police hit squads targeting figures in the gang underworld and tobacco trade and corruption within the South African Police Service. His reporting on the assassination of Deokaran was shortlisted for the Global Shining Light Award, which recognises investigative journalism conducted under threat or difficult conditions in developing countries.

He is a two-time recipient of the Taco Kuiper Award for Investigative Journalism and received the Nat Nakasa Award for courageous journalism in 2024.

He is also a recipient of the 2023 and 2025 Vodacom Journalism Awards.

== Works ==
- Silenced (News24 series)
- Wicks, Jeff (2025).The Shadow State. Why Babita Deokaran Had to Die. South Africa: Tafelberg. ISBN 9780624094944
