= Boy Mamabolo =

South African politician

Member of the National Assembly of South Africa
- In office 22 May 2019 – 28 May 2024

Personal details
- Born: Jacob Boy Mamabolo Masakaneng, Seshego, Transvaal Province, South Africa
- Citizenship: South Africa
- Profession: Politician

Jacob Boy Mamabolo is a South African politician from Limpopo who served as a Member of the National Assembly of South Africa. He was elected to Parliament at the 2019 general election and left parliament at the 2024 general election. Mamabolo was a member of the African National Congress.

== Early life ==
Mamabolo hails from Masakeng, Seshego. He and current Economic Freedom Fighters president Julius Malema grew up in the same community and both became involved in the same organisations. Both were members of the Congress of South African Students (COSAS) and the African National Congress Youth League (ANCYL). He was the COSAS provincial secretary when Malema was the organisation's national president. Their friendship ended while they were active in the ANCYL. Mamabolo was a supporter of former ANC president Jacob Zuma while Malema turned on Zuma.

== Political career ==
Mamabolo was placed second on the ANC's regional list for the May 2019 general election. At the election, he was elected as an MP. He sat on both the Portfolio Committee on Sports, Arts and Culture and the Standing Committee on the Auditor-General.

In September 2025, Mamabolo quit the ANC, intending to register his own party. Initially planning to call it "Mandela for President", the name and branding was rejected by the Independent Electoral Commission, with "Born to Win" being proposed as an alternative.

== Controversies ==
When Malema was suspended as youth league president in 2011, Mamabolo burnt a mock coffin in celebration. In 2013, he was involved in a court battle with Malema after he sent him a message threatening to exhume his mother's remains and take them to his grandmother's house. In the same year, Mamabolo was arrested on fraud charges relating to his tenure as the chairperson of the Limpopo Geographical Names Committee.

=== 2020 State of the Nation Address ===
While EFF MPs disrupted the 2020 annual State of the Nation Address, Mamabolo rose on a point of order and said:

Speaker, we’ve been abused for too long, we cannot be abused in the same manner that Mantwa [Malema’s spouse] is being abused by honourable Malema… nna le lelena re dithaka (English: "we are peers"), let’s leave elderly people and go engage outside.

In the subsequent debate, he once again accused Malema of domestic abuse. Consequently, Malema and his spouse approached the Limpopo High Court and filed lawsuits of R1 million each, citing defamation. The two parties reached an out-of-court agreement wherein Mamabolo apologised, saying that his utterances were "uncalled for".

=== Threats ===
In 2020, Mamabolo was condemned by the South African National Editors Forum for violent threats against a journalist.

In 2022, Mamabolo was reported to have made a death threat to the editor of The Star newspaper, demanding that he stop reporting on Bejani Chauke, an adviser to President Cyril Ramaphosa, or face "assassination".

In July 2025, the court ruled that Mamabolo's Facebook account be deactivated, and that he refrain from publishing defamatory statements against Polokwane’s mayor and family.
