= StoneToss =

American neo-Nazi cartoonist

- StoneToss logo used since 2024
- Area: Cartoonist
- Pseudonym: StoneToss
- Notable works: StoneToss
- Current status/schedule: Ongoing
- Launch date: July 18, 2017
- Publisher: Self-published (webcomic)
- Genre: Far-right political cartoon
- Original language: English

StoneToss is a pseudonymous American neo-Nazi cartoonist who publishes a webcomic of the same name. (Note: Supported by multiple sources.) Launched in June 2017, the comic has espoused racist, sexist, transphobic, homophobic, and antisemitic views, including Holocaust denial.

In March 2024, after an antifascist group published materials claiming to have revealed his identity, StoneToss sought help from Twitter's owner Elon Musk. Twitter then suspended multiple users who included StoneToss's alleged real name in their tweets and amended its privacy policy to prohibit disclosure of others' real names. Some of the site's users and critics said the move was evidence of Musk's preferential treatment for neo-Nazis, antisemites, and white supremacists.

== Overview ==
StoneToss debuted his eponymous cartoon series on his website in July 2017. He also posts his cartoons on Twitter and has tried to keep his identity secret. He has described himself as an "independent cartoonist" and an "NFT artist".

The author, who is described by experts, journalists, and other critics as a neo-Nazi creator, takes a non-overt, crypto-Nazi approach to channel and normalize neo-Nazi viewpoints with reference to trending events or social dynamics. Among the various extreme ideas conveyed, antisemitism is a pronounced element, with one cartoon having the topic of Jewish deicide as its theme, and various others including Holocaust denial dog whistles. The webcomic also includes sexist tropes, anti-Black sentiment, and some use suicide among transgender people as a punchline. Visually, the webcomic consists of simple and colorful line drawings.

The webcomic has substantial popularity in right-wing online communities, having received millions of views on Twitter. Reddit and Discord banned their respective official StoneToss communities in 2019. StoneToss was also banned from non-fungible token (NFT) websites, including OpenSea. On Facebook and Instagram, as of 2021, some of the cartoons were posted by the author in heavily pixellated versions to prevent them from breaching those platforms' policies.

Both right-wing and left-wing online communities share and interact with StoneToss' cartoons, causing them to gain increased visibility. Subreddits have adapted StoneToss' work for their own purposes, remixing them into memes, commonly titled "stonetossedit" or "stonetoss is a nazi". In particular, Internet users on the left have appropriated them, adding layers of irony—however, the subversion of their message is not easily understood by most people. Conversely, in right-wing online circles, the cartoons have at times been reposted, not as memes in the usual sense, but as regular posts that the users find relatable and whose message they agree with.

== Alleged revelation of identity ==
In March 2024, Anonymous Comrades Collective and Late Night Anti-Fascists claimed to have revealed the identity of StoneToss using leaked information from Gab, a social media website with a far-right userbase. According to the material they published, he is a Texan former security guard and IT professional. The group said that he had also created the RedPanels webcomic, described by the Southern Poverty Law Center as a neo-Nazi comic.

StoneToss denied being a neo-Nazi, and sought protection from Twitter's owner Elon Musk through individuals who had contacts with him. This was followed by a controversy after Twitter suspended multiple users who posted the author's alleged real name, including civil rights attorney and transgender rights activist Alejandra Caraballo, who had tweeted and changed her username to the effect of maximizing the visibility of the disclosed information. Twitter's response created an instance of the Streisand effect, amplifying the spread of the information. This was followed by renewed concerns about content moderation on Twitter under Elon Musk, especially regarding content that promotes far-right ideas.

After a few days, Twitter amended its privacy policy—which at the time expressly excluded real names from what it considers private information—to prohibit disclosure of others' real names. Prior to the change, the lack of such a rule made it possible for right-wing accounts to target LGBTQ people by posting their private information, and critics of Twitter under Musk had been voicing concerns that the site was sanctioning users who challenge extremism on the platform while enabling those who post such content to continue doing so. Following the policy change, the critics cited it as an additional example of the platform under Musk protecting that latter group of users. Months later, Black Enterprise cited the controversy as one example of events related to concerns about Twitter's moderation that preceded the World Bank's decision to pull its advertising from the platform.

== See also ==
- List of Streisand effect examples
- Sinfest
- David Dees
