= Theodore Katsanevas =

Greek academic and politician (1947–2021)

Theodoros Katsanevas

Member of the Hellenic Parliament for Athens B
- In office 5 November 1989 – 6 March 2004

Personal details
- Born: 13 March 1947 Athens, Greece
- Died: 8 May 2021 (aged 74) Athens, Greece
- Party: Panhellenic Socialist Movement (until 2013); Drachmi Greek Democratic Movement Five Stars (2013-2015)
- Spouses: Sofia Papandreou (−2000); Georgia Tsetsou
- Education: University of Piraeus; University of Warwick; London School of Economics
- Profession: Economist
- Website: unipi.gr/katsanevas

Theodore Katsanevas (Greek: Θεόδωρος Κατσανέβας; 13 March 1947 – 8 May 2021) was a Greek academic and politician. He was a member of the Greek Parliament from 1989 to 2004 for the Panhellenic Socialist Movement (PA.SO.K). In May 2013, Katsanevas founded the political party Drachmi Greek Democratic Movement Five Stars, which campaigns for Greece to abandon the euro and return to the drachma.

== Biography ==
Katsanevas received his degree from the University of Piraeus. He obtained an MA from the University of Warwick and a PhD from the London School of Economics. He was a professor of labour economics at the University of Piraeus. His family hails from Antikythira.

In 1981, Katsanevas was among the authors of the program for the first cabinet of Andreas Papandreou and he was first appointed to the Manpower Employment Organisation (OAED, Οργανισμός Απασχόλησης Εργατικού Δυναμικού; Ο.Α.Ε.Δ.), then in 1985 to the state welfare agency. He was elected deputy in the second electoral district of Athens with PASOK from 1989 until 2004, when he was officially restricted from standing as a candidate by the party itself.

Economist Stavros Thomadakis called Katsanevas's 1984 book, Trade Unions in Greece "an important contribution to the systematic examination of the Greek labor union movement."

As early as 2011, Katsanevas and other Greek economists advocated for Greece to abandon the euro and return to its former national currency, the drachma, as a response to the Greek government-debt crisis. In 2013 he went on to found Drachmi Greek Democratic Movement Five Stars, a Greek political party advocating the currency change.

== Papandreou heritage ==
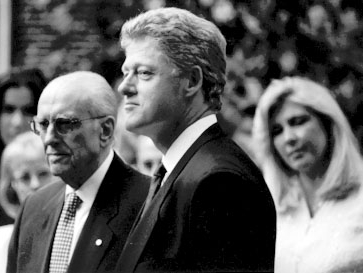
Dimitra Liani (background, right), Andreas Papandreou (left) and United States President Bill Clinton in Washington, USA, in April 1994

Until their divorce in 2000, Katsanevas was married to Sophia, the daughter of Andreas Papandreou, former Prime Minister of Greece. In Papandreou's will, as publicly disclosed on 13 September 1996, he described Katsanevas as a "disgrace to the family" (Greek: όνειδος της οικογένειας) and said that "his aim was to politically inherit the history of struggle of Georgios Papandreou and Andreas Papandreou" (Georgios Papandreou was Andreas' father and was also a Greek Prime Minister).

Papandreou's four children objected to their father's will, in which he left his entire estate to his third wife, former flight attendant Dimitra Liani. Papandreou's relationship with Liani had been a source of controversy during his last years in public office, when his health was failing. He had placed Liani in charge of his office, and opponents of Papandreou alleged that she was overstepping the bounds of her authority and seeking to advance a political career of her own. Liani became the subject of unfavourable news media attention, including publication, by the newspaper Avriani (which for many years supported Papandreou) of old photographs that showed her naked with men and other women. These photographs were immediately denounced as a "crude photo-montage" and Liani accused Katsanevas of orchestrating the publicity against her; Papandreou supported her, seeking unsuccessfully to convince his three sons to ostracize their brother-in-law.

Katsanevas disputed the validity of the will and in 2003 won a defamation trial against Spyros Karatzaferis, publisher of a newspaper which for some time in 1998 featured, every day on the front page, a photograph of Katsanevas subtitled "Disgrace". However, the judgement in the case did not address the authenticity of the will.

=== Wikipedia lawsuit ===
As a result of this matter being described in Katsanevas' biography in the Greek Wikipedia, he brought a lawsuit against a Greek Wikipedia user and administrator known by the user name "Diu" and the Open Technologies Alliance (GFOSS), although neither has any control over the Wikipedia. The judge temporarily ordered the administrator to remove the information from Wikipedia. The administrator complied, but the information was soon replaced by another editor. The temporary court order was reversed on 1 September 2014, while the main trial was still pending. The administrator noted that the lawsuit and publicity had produced a Streisand effect and that the original Greek article was now hosted in translation on multiple Wikipedias in English, Catalan, Polish, Yakut, French, German, Dutch, Spanish, and Italian.

The Wikimedia Foundation financially supported the legal defense of the Wikipedia user subject to the defamation lawsuit in Greece. In 2018 the trial ended with Katsanevas dropping all claims.

== Death ==
Katsanevas died on 8 May 2021, at age 74, from COVID-19 at a hospital in Athens during the COVID-19 pandemic in Greece.

== Bibliography ==
Some selected publications:

- —— (1984). Trade Unions in Greece: An Analysis of Factors Determining Their Growth and Present Structure. University of London. OCLC 12351031.
- —— (2000). Demetrius S. Iatridis (ed.). The Effects of Privatization on Employment in Bulgaria Romania and Albania. Greenwood Publishing Group. ISBN 978-0-275-96791-8.
- —— (2008). "The Computerized Career Gate Test K.17". New Directions in Intelligent Interactive Multimedia. Studies in Computational Intelligence. Vol. 142. pp. 427–438. doi:10.1007/978-3-540-68127-4_44. ISBN 978-3-540-68126-7.
