= Our Poisoned Land =

2022 book by Jacques Pauw

Our Poisoned Land: Living in the Shadows of Zuma’s Keepers
- Author: Jacques Pauw
- Language: English
- Subject: Jacob Zuma; Arthur Fraser; corruption in South Africa; espionage; State Security Agency; South African politics
- Genre: Non-fiction
- Published: 2022
- Publisher: NB publishers
- Publication date: 11 November 2022
- Publication place: South Africa
- Pages: 336
- ISBN: 9780624090533 (Paperback)
- Preceded by: The President's Keepers: Those Keeping Zuma in Power and out of Prison

Our Poisoned Land: Living in the Shadows of Zuma's Keepers a 2022 book by Jacques Pauw, a South African investigative journalist, about the allegedly corrupt power networks between the South African government and the country's political elite, most notably the African National Congress (ANC). The book follows on from Pauw's 2017 book The President's Keepers but with greater focus on government institutions not looked at in the previous book and the State Security Agency (SSA). It is updated to include findings from government committees and investigations such as the Zondo Commission. It asks why, after 5 years since the end of the Zuma administration, have most people implicated in state corruption still not been prosecuted and examines efforts to fight corruption in the post-Jacob Zuma ANC government under Cyril Ramaphosa.

== Synopsis ==
A particular focus of the book is on the SSA and its head, appointed by President Jacob Zuma, Arthur Fraser. It examines a number of issues ranging from the allegedly corrupt systematic funneling of large sums of public money from the SSA to fund the ANC, and internal ANC power battles in support of former president Zuma, to alleged links between the leader of the Economic Freedom Fighters (EFF), Julius Malema, and suspected illicit tobacco trader Adriano Mazzotti. The book alleges that a number of corrupt senior police officials and prosecutors in the SAPS, crime intelligence, Hawks, and the National Prosecuting Authority are still in positions of power thereby preventing investigations and prosecutions for state corruption.

== Reception ==
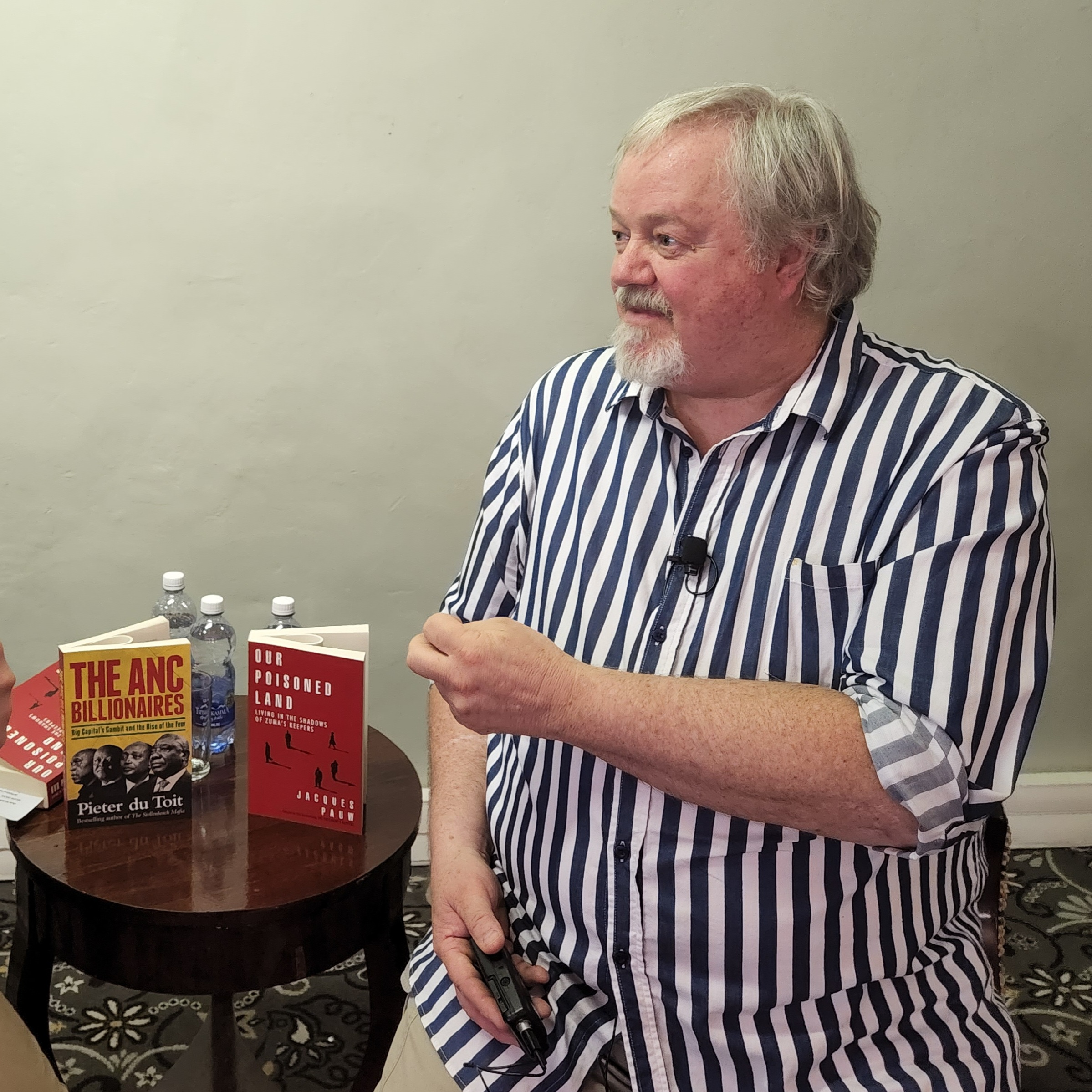
Jacques Pauw at the book launch of Our Poisoned Land in Cape Town.

Allegations in the book by Pauw connecting Julius Malema and other senior EFF members to organised crime resulted in the EFF trying to block the sale of the book through legal action. It was speculated in the media that, similar to Zuma's efforts to ban The President's Keepers, these efforts resulted in a Streisand effect that helped boost sales of the book. Jeremy Gordin, in a review for the South African political news aggregator PoliticsWeb, described the book as being more about the "life and “adventures”" of the author than as a sequel to the Presidents Keepers whilst also being a "thorough, proficient (and sometimes entertaining) compilation" of the state corruption it examines.

The book was the number one Christmas best selling book in South Africa in 2022.
