= Drachmi Greek Democratic Movement Five Stars =

Drachmi Greek Democratic Movement Five Stars ΔΡΑΧΜΗ Ελληνική Δημοκρατική Κίνηση Πέντε Αστέρια
- Leader: Theodore Katsanevas
- Founded: 1 May 2013
- Dissolved: 29 June 2015
- Split from: Panhellenic Socialist Movement
- Ideology: Populism; Single-issue politics Euroscepticism
- Political position: Centre to Centre-left
- Colours: Orange; Blue

Website
- www.drachmi5.gr

Drachmi Greek Democratic Movement Five Stars (abbreviated as: Drachma Five Star) was a Greek eurosceptic political party established on May 1, 2013 by Theodore Katsanevas (1947-2021), a one-time member of PASOK and son-in-law of Andreas Papandreou, with a primary target for Greece to abandon the euro and to return to the drachma.

== Purpose ==
The purpose of the party was for Greece to abandon the euro in favour of the drachma. The five stars symbolise "the overturn of the Memorandum, the return to the drachma, robust growth, national dignity and social justice", but they also clearly state a connection to the Italian party Five Star Movement of the comic actor Beppe Grillo and the Italian press refer to Theodoros Katsanevas as "the Greek Beppe Grillo". The party states that it supports "patriotic socialism".

== Collaborations ==
On 15 July 2013, Nikitas Baritakis, former Secretary of the Communications Sector Commission withdrew from PASOK and became member of the party Drachma Five Star while earlier that month there had been a meeting of the Drachma Five Stars with the Patriotic Social Movement where they found identification of several positions. In September 2013, Dr. Bernd Lucke, leader of the Alternative for Germany party, said that they will gradually make alliances with like-minded parties, like the party of Mr. Katsanevas. in a meeting of the two eurosceptic parties which took place in Germany.

== Reaction of the international press ==
The creation of the party was recorded in the Italian press, the Turkish press as well as in Brussels. Elsewhere, importance is brought to the convergence of populist and anti-European leftist parties like Drachma 5 Star and Plan B, as well as of right-wing parties such as Golden Dawn and the "inclusive right wing platform", Independent Greeks both in Greece, as well as among Southern Europe countries. Attention has been also given to the proposals of the party for a unified currency in south European countries (Greece, Italy, Spain, Portugal and Cyprus).
