= Alejandra Caraballo =

American civil rights attorney

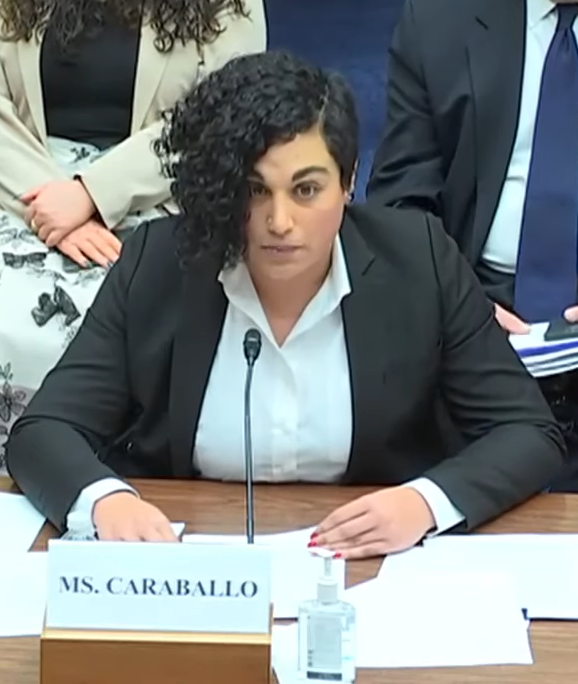
- Caraballo testifying to the US House of Representatives in 2022
- Born: 1990 or 1991 (age 35–36); Florida, U.S.
- Education: University of Tampa (B.A.); Harvard University (MPA); Brooklyn Law School (J.D.)
- Occupations: Civil rights attorney, academic, activist
- Employer: Harvard Law School Cyberlaw Clinic
- Website: alejandracaraballo.com

Alejandra Caraballo (Spanish pronunciation: [aleˈxandɾa kaɾaˈβaʎo]; born 1990 or 1991) is an American civil rights attorney and clinical instructor at the Harvard Law School Cyberlaw Clinic. Caraballo is a transgender rights activist and has spoken out against anti-LGBTQ legislation, policies, and rhetoric.

== Early life and education ==
When Caraballo was fifteen years old, her father became permanently disabled after losing an arm in a workplace accident. She said her family's struggles with the workers' compensation system, and the help from attorneys in resolving them, "demonstrated to me the power that the law can have".

Caraballo earned a bachelor's degree in Government and World Affairs from the University of Tampa. She then earned a J.D. from Brooklyn Law School, where she studied with a concentration in intellectual property and media law. Shortly after she passed the bar exam, she came out as transgender.

Caraballo is Latina.

== Career ==
Caraballo was a staff attorney at the LGBTQ Law Project at the New York Legal Assistance Group, representing LGBTQ individuals seeking asylum and other immigrants. She then worked as a staff attorney with the Transgender Legal Defense & Education Fund, focusing on national advocacy.

In 2021, she joined the Cyberlaw Clinic at the Harvard Law School as a clinical instructor. She and another instructor who began teaching the same month were the first trans women of color to teach at the law school. The New York Times described Caraballo as an expert on transgender issues; she has spent years monitoring anti-LGBTQ rhetoric online.

== Political activism ==
Starting in 2019, Caraballo served on a Brooklyn community board. In 2020 she announced her candidacy for New York City's 35th City Council district seat, and campaigned on defunding the New York City Police Department and redirecting the funds towards other services, as well as improving affordable housing. She ultimately left the race before the election.

Caraballo is a democratic socialist. As of April 2021, she was a member of the Stonewall Democratic Club of New York City.

Caraballo has been outspoken about what she sees as anti-LGBTQ legislation and policies, rhetoric from prominent individuals, and inadequate social media moderation surrounding the topic. In March 2022, she criticized the Florida Parental Rights in Education Act, also nicknamed the "Don't Say Gay" bill by its opponents, which was introduced in January 2022 and signed into law by Governor Ron DeSantis the following March. Caraballo described the bill as "an unprecedented attack on LGBTQ rights", predicting it would likely lead to a serious reversal in policies protecting LGBTQ rights in schools. Later that year, Caraballo was critical of Elon Musk's actions after acquiring Twitter, including his decision to reinstate accounts that had been suspended for threats, harassment, or misinformation.

== Social media activity ==
In a tweet published on December 29, 2022, Caraballo suggested that the arrest of American-British social media personality Andrew Tate in Romania on human trafficking charges was facilitated by a video he posted online revealing his location by showing the name of a Romanian pizzeria. Caraballo's tweet quickly went viral and led to the proliferation of the rumor online. A spokesperson for Romania's Directorate for Investigating Organized Crime and Terrorism said the rumor was "funny" but untrue. Caraballo later acknowledged what she described as "fair criticism" that she had jumped to conclusions, but publicly defended her rationale for making the claim.

In March 2024, Caraballo was permanently suspended from Twitter after she posted about the alleged real identity of Neo-Nazi cartoonist StoneToss and changed her username to maximize the visibility of the disclosed information. Caraballo's account was reinstated shortly afterwards, but remained locked for seven days.

The day before the publication of the UK National Health Service's Cass Review on gender services for children and young people in April 2024, Caraballo tweeted that the report was holding transgender health care to an "impossible standard" and had "disregarded nearly all studies" since double-blind controlled studies could not be used to evaluate the effects of transgender hormone therapy. Hilary Cass, the lead author of the report, disputed Caraballo's claims about the report, and said that 60 out of the 103 studies reviewed were used in making the report's conclusions.
