= The President's Keepers =

Book by Jacques Pauw

The President's Keepers: Those Keeping Zuma in Power and Out of Prison
- Author: Jacques Pauw
- Language: English
- Subject: Jacob Zuma; corruption in South Africa; espionage; Gupta family; South African politics
- Genre: Non-fiction
- Publisher: NB Publishers
- Publication date: 29 October 2017
- Publication place: South Africa
- Pages: 360
- ISBN: 978-0-624-08303-0 (Paperback)
- Followed by: Our Poisoned Land

The President's Keepers: Those Keeping Zuma in Power and out of Prison a 2017 book by Jacques Pauw, a South African investigative journalist, about allegedly corrupt and compromised power networks in the South African government under President Jacob Zuma.

== Synopsis ==
In eighteen chapters and an epilogue, the book details the creation and functioning of a "shadow mafia state" created by and surrounding President Jacob Zuma. Pauw makes a number of serious allegations about Zuma, including that he did not pay taxes during his presidency, that he was illegally paid R1 million ($70,000) a month by a private company while president, that he failed to pay back loans, and that he has poor financial acumen.

The book also makes a number of accusations concerning criminal and other misconduct by various associates of Zuma. These include that the Gupta family groomed the children of African National Congress (ANC) politicians to gain political influence and that Nkosazana Dlamini-Zuma's 2017 campaign for ANC president was funded by a cigarette company engaged in corruption. It also contains details of the state capture of the South African Revenue Service (SARS) and the wasteful creation of a R1-billion (around US$70,000,000) spy network within the State Security Agency (SSA) that allegedly engaged in widespread corruption.

== Reception ==
Within four days of the book's publication it was cited in parliamentary questions directed at the president by the opposition Democratic Alliance. On 3 November 2017, the SSA issued a cease and desist letter against Pauw and NB Publishers, arguing that the book contravened the Intelligence Service Act. SARS also stated that they would consider initiating criminal charges against Pauw for publicising confidential tax records. The actions by the SSA and SARS were criticised as censorship by civil society organisations including the Right2Know Campaign and Corruption Watch, as well as by the South African Communist Party. The Public Protector, Busisiwe Mkhwebane, also cautioned the public against purchasing the book, and the family of SSA head Arthur Fraser said that they would consider taking legal action against Pauw for what they said were inaccuracies in the book.

NB Publishers and various book stores said that they would continue to distribute the book, which they said contained factual information that was in the public interest. Indeed, fear that the book would be banned caused a spike in its sales: it sold out of its first print run of 20,000 books within 24 hours of the SSA's cease and desist letter and became an international best seller. Because of the resulting shortage of books, combined with the threat of censorship, a digitally pirated version of the book was widely shared in the week after the cease and desist letter.

A launch of the book on the evening of Wednesday 8 November 2017 was cancelled after a power outage. During the launch, Pauw told attendees that he expected to spend years fighting legal battles. He also said that he had received anonymous death threats. In February 2018, the Hawks searched his home and guesthouse in Riebeek-Kasteel, Western Cape in connection with an ongoing criminal investigation. However, in September of that year, SARS, by then under new leadership, announced that it would drop its litigation against Pauw.

According to audited six-month sales figures, the book sold 193,895 copies, around 26,000 of which were ebooks, by late March 2018. As of May 2018, around 197,000 copies had been sold.

== Awards ==
The book won the International Freedom to Publish Award from the Association of American Publishers and received the Nielsen Booksellers' Choice Award.
