= Babita Deokaran (whistleblower) =

South African whistleblower and civil servant (died 2021)

- Born: 1968
- Died: 23 August 2021 (aged 53); Mondeor, Johannesburg, Gauteng, South Africa
- Occupation: Civil servant
- Employer: Gauteng Department of Health
- Known for: Exposing corruption and procurement irregularities in the Gauteng Department of Health
- Title: Acting Chief Financial Officer
- Children: 1

Babita Deokaran (1968 - 23 August 2021) was a South African civil servant and whistleblower who exposed large-scale corruption and procurement irregularities within the Department of Health in Gauteng. She was the acting Chief Financial Officer at Tembisa Hospital. She was assassinated on 23 August 2021 outside her home in Johannesburg shortly after uncovering evidence of financial misconduct in hospital tenders. Her death drew national and international attention to the dangers faced by whistleblowers in South Africa.

== Whistle-blowing and corruption exposure ==
In her capacity as Chief Director: Financial Accounting in the Gauteng Department of Health, Deokaran became aware of extensive irregularities in supply-chain and procurement processes within the department. She compiled detailed reports exposing suspicious transactions at Tembisa Hospital amounting to approximately R850 million.

According to the News24 investigative series Silenced, she was a “bulwark against irregular and dubious payments” and tried to halt about R100 million in questionable transfers in the weeks before her murder. Her analysis revealed a network of at least 217 entities that appeared to benefit from inflated and duplicate invoices. She flagged multiple irregular purchases, including hospital procurements of 200 pairs of children's skinny jeans for R500 000 and leather wingback chairs costing the same amount—items that bore no relevance to hospital needs.

In one WhatsApp message to a superior shortly before her death, Deokaran warned:

I am just worried that the guys in Tembisa are going to realise we are not releasing their payments and know that we are on to something. Our lives could be in danger.

She submitted her findings to departmental leadership and urged that an urgent forensic audit be launched. The report was received roughly three weeks before her assassination but was not formally escalated for action.

Deokaran's work formed the evidentiary basis of the Special Investigating Unit (SIU) probe into maladministration and procurement fraud at Tembisa Hospital, which later confirmed the validity of her findings. The News24 investigation and later SIU reports credited her with first unmasking what became known as a “tender mafia” operating within the Gauteng health system—a network of shell companies and politically connected contractors responsible for extracting hundreds of millions of rand from the department. Her exposure of these practices positioned her as one of South Africa's most consequential public-sector whistleblowers during the COVID-19 pandemic.

== Assassination ==
On 23 August 2021, Deokaran was shot multiple times outside her home in Mondeor, Johannesburg South after dropping her daughter at school. She was struck by several bullets fired into her vehicle in what authorities described as a “targeted assassination” linked to her exposure of corruption.

Six men were arrested and charged with her murder. In August 2023, a plea deal in the Johannesburg High Court led to their conviction and sentencing. The group - Phakamani Hadebe, Sanele Mbhele, Zitha Radebe, Siphiwe Mazibuko, Siphakanyiswa Dladla and Nhlangano Ndlovu - received sentences ranging from six to twenty-two years.

The Hawks and SIU continue to investigate the masterminds behind her assassination, as none have yet been charged.

The murder of Deokaran sparked national outrage and renewed debate about whistleblower protection in South Africa. In December 2022, the SIU confirmed that her findings on Tembisa Hospital were accurate, forming the basis for further investigations into maladministration and fraud.

Her courage has been recognised posthumously. In 2025, she was honoured with the Risk Influencer of the Year award by the Institute of Risk Management South Africa for her contribution to integrity in public service.

== See also ==
- Hangwani Maumela
- Vusimuzi Matlala
- Tembisa Hospital
- Madlanga Commission
