= Prevention of Corrupt Activities Act, 2004 =

Prevention of Corrupt Activities Act 12, 2004

Parliament of South Africa
- Long title: To provide for the strengthening of measures to prevent and combat corruption and corrupt activities; to provide for the offence of corruption and offences relating to corrupt activities; to provide for investigative measures in respect of corruption and related corrupt activities; to provide for the establishment and endorsement of a Register in order to place certain restrictions on persons and enterprises convicted of corrupt activities relating to tenders and contracts; to place a duty on certain persons holding a position of authority to report certain corrupt transactions; to provide for extraterritorial jurisdiction in respect of the offence of corruption and offences relating to corrupt activities; and to provide for matters connected therewith.
- Citation: Act No. 12 of 2004
- Enacted by: Parliament of South Africa
- Assented to: 27 April 2004
- Commenced: 27 April 2004
- Status: In force

Prevention of Corrupt Activities Act, Act 12 of 2004 in South Africa provides for the strengthening of measures to prevent and combat corruption and corrupt activities in both the public and private sectors of South African society.

== Content of the Act ==
The following is a brief description of the sections of the Prevention of Corrupt Activities Act:

=== Definitions and interpretation ===
Section 1

Defines the explanations of keywords in the Act.

Section 2

Defines in regard to the Act, what the definition is of "having knowledge of a fact" and defines what "knowing" means. Defines what is "accepting or agreeing or offering to accept any gratification" and defines what is "to give or agree or offer to give any gratification". Defines that "any person" can mean someone in the private sector.

=== Offences in respect of corrupt activities ===
Section 3

Defines what is regarded as corruption to be found guilty of an offence.

Section 4

Defines what is regarded as corruption in regard to public officials to be found guilty of an offence.

Section 5

Defines what is regarded as corruption in regard to foreign public officials to be found guilty of an offence.

Section 6

Defines what is regarded as corruption in regard to agents to be found guilty of an offence.

Section 7

Defines what is regarded as corruption in regard to members of a legislative authority to be found guilty of an offence.

Section 8

Defines what is regarded as corruption in regard to judicial officers to be found guilty of an offence.

Section 9

Defines what is regarded as corruption in regard to prosecuting authorities to be found guilty of an offence.

Section 10

Defines what is regarded as corruption regarding receiving or offering of unauthorised gratification by or party to an employment relationship to be found guilty of an offence.

Section 11

Defines the offences one is guilty of in respect of corrupt activities relating to witnesses and evidential material during certain proceedings.

Section 12

Defines the offences one is guilty of in respect of corrupt activities relating to contracts.

Section 13

Defines the offences in respect of corrupt activities relating to procuring and withdrawal of tenders.

Section 14

Defines the offences in respect of corrupt activities relating to auctions.

Section 15

Defines the offences in respect of corrupt activities relating to sporting event

Section 16

Defines the offences in respect of corrupt activities relating to gambling games or games of chance.

Section 17

Defines the offence in relation to acquisition of private interest in contract, agreement, or investment of public body.

Section 18

Defines the offence of an unacceptable conduct relating to witnesses.

Section 19

Defines the offence of intentional interference with, hindering or obstruction of an investigation of an offence.

Section 20

Defines the offence of accessory to gratification or gratification after the offence to be found guilty.

Section 21

Defines the offence of attempting, conspiracy and inducing another person to commit offence to be found guilty.

=== Investigations regarding possession of property relating to corrupt activities ===
Section 22

Defines the rights of the National Director of Prosecutions to institute an investigation in regards offences covered in Section 2 to 4 and later seize property related to corrupt activities.

Section 23

Defines the procedures for the National Director of Prosecutions to apply before a judge to issue an investigation direction in respect of possession of property disproportionate to a person's present or past known sources of income or assets. Defines the judges procedures. Defines the National Director of Prosecutions right, after being granted investigation directions, to summon, question and enter a suspect's premises. Defines it as an offence to obstruct, hinder or provide misleading information.

=== Presumptions and defences ===
Section 24

Defines the presumptions that the State can use when a person is charged with an offence in relation to parts and sections of the Act. It also defines that presumptions the State can use if a person investigating or prosecuting a person accepts a gratification.

Section 25

Defines in relation to parts and sections of the Act, certain court defences that are not valid.

=== Penalties and related matters ===
Section 26

Defines the penalties of fines or imprisonment after being found guilty of an offence, depending on what type of court the offence was heard in and what parts of the Act or sections they have been found guilty of.

Section 27

Defines when the National Director of Prosecutions can proceed to prosecute. Defines the right of the accuse to a proper investigation of the allegation, give an explanation, and have legal advice.

Section 28

Defines that an offence can be recorded in a Register and the details if the court so decides. Defines, once on the register, the powers of the National Treasury to cancel tenders or agreements, the time penalties being between 5 and 10 years before resumption of tendering or agreements, and the purchasing sections from any government department being informed. Defines the National Treasury right to use legal remedies to recover funds. Defines that National Treasury inform all its decision. Defines that any person or enterprise that has been on the register must declare it or it is an offence.

=== Register for tender defaulters ===
Section 29

Defines that the Minister of Finance establish a register known as the Register for Tender Defaulters within the Office of the National Treasury.

Section 30

Defines that the Minister of Finance appoint a Registrar.

Section 31

Defines the powers, duties, and functions of Registrar.

Section 32

Defines that the register is open to the public.

Section 33

Defines the Finance Minister's abilities to create regulations for the Register and penalties for contravening the regulations.

=== Miscellaneous matters ===
Section 34

Defines who is regarded as being in a position of authority, and if they are knowledgeable or should have known about, a person/s who has committed an offence as stated in the Act, or and offence over R100,000 in other case, must report it to the police. It's an offence if one fails to report it. Police with record the report and issue a receipt. National Commissioner must publish within three months, depending on section34 1(a) or (b) in the Government Gazette of South Africa or in Parliament prior to publication.

Section 35

Defines that if an offence committed under Act occurred outside South Africa, the courts would have authority if certain conditions were met.

Section 36

Defines that laws or sections of certain laws are amended and listed in the schedule. Criminal proceedings and investigations under the Corruption Act 1992, existing prior to commencement of this Act continue as if the Act didn't exist. Other Acts or sections amended by this Act remain in place for criminal proceedings and investigations under the Corruption Act 1992 prior to the assent.

Section 37

Defines the name of the Act, the date it came into operation and that section 34(2) came into operation on 31 July 2004.
