= Hangwani Maumela =

South African businessman

- Born: February 21, 1972 (age 54); Johannesburg, South Africa
- Other name: Morgan Hangwani Maumela
- Occupation: Businessman (tenderpreneur)
- Known for: Alleged role in Tembisa Hospital corruption scandal

Hangwani Morgan Maumela is a South African businessman and tenderpreneur who has been implicated in a major corruption investigation at Gauteng’s Tembisa Hospital. Investigators describe him as the head of a syndicate that allegedly fraudulently extracted over R820 million from hospital procurement contracts. News24 called him the Tembisa Hospital “tender don” and noted that he and related associates used a network of dozens of companies to win and inflate contracts.

Maumela owns multiple luxury properties in Sandton, Bantry Bay and Ballito, and a fleet of high-end vehicles including Lamborghinis, Bentleys, and a Pagani Huayra Roadster hypercar. His aunt was once married to President Cyril Ramaphosa, making Maumela Ramaphosa’s nephew by marriage (though Ramaphosa has publicly stated he had no prior dealings with him).

Investigations by the Special Investigating Unit (SIU) and law enforcement have seized and frozen hundreds of millions of rand in assets belonging to Maumela and his associates. In October 2025 the SIU executed preservation orders on roughly R900 million of property linked to his syndicate, including luxury homes and vehicles. In coordinated raids at his Sandton mansion on 8–9 October 2025, authorities seized multiple supercars, art and other valuables as part of an asset-forfeiture operation tied to the Tembisa Hospital scandal. The Asset Forfeiture Unit (AFU) had already obtained court orders to freeze Maumela’s assets, including mansions in Sandton, Bantry Bay and Ballito worth a combined R320 million, and by mid-September 2025 had frozen roughly R400 million in cars and homes linked to him and co-accused Rudolph Mazibuko.

Maumela has not been formally charged with a crime, and no conviction has been reported. However, civil and criminal investigations continue. The National Prosecuting Authority (NPA) Asset Forfeiture Unit continues to preserve his assets for potential forfeiture, and opposition parties and civic organisations have demanded expedited prosecution and recovery of the stolen funds.

== Business ventures ==
Hangwani Maumela rose to prominence in Gauteng as a tenderpreneur. He controlled a “flotilla” of companies dealing in goods and services for Gauteng health facilities. In particular, at least fourteen companies linked to Maumela were awarded Tembisa Hospital contracts worth about R415 million. Babita Deokaran (chief accountant at Gauteng Health) had red-flagged millions in payments to firms connected to Maumela shortly before her assassination in 2021. The same report noted that twelve of Maumela’s companies were among those hit by the whistleblower’s warnings, and that his family business network “established a dynasty” supplying medical goods across Gauteng, with Tembisa Hospital being its “heyday”.

Through these companies, Maumela secured a large volume of contracts at Tembisa. Maumela and an associate had won R36 million in contracts in just a few weeks at the hospital, out of over a thousand transactions then under investigation. Investigators eventually traced at least 41 supplier accounts linked to Maumela’s syndicate. Although details of individual companies are obscured by the complexity of shell-company networks, investigations identify some front companies for example, Exclusive Pioneers Trading Enterprise, Magnolia Trading and others that were awarded tenders through irregular processes. These entities supplied everything from food and catering services to medical equipment, often through bogus quotations or split orders that bypassed normal procurement rules.

During his testimony during the Madlanga Commission in August 2026, Vusimuzi Matlala mentioned that Maumela was the director of his security company, CAT VIP Protection.

== Tembisa Hospital scandal ==
In late 2022 the SIU launched an investigation into procurement at Tembisa Hospital. Its interim report, released in September 2025, detailed a network of nine parallel syndicates that collectively looted an estimated R2 billion from the hospital over a two-year period. One syndicate, labeled the “Maumela Syndicate”, was linked to Hangwani Maumela. The SIU found “1,728 bundles worth R816,560,710” of hospital payments associated with Maumela’s group, and uncovered significant irregularities in those contracts. He was implicated as the kingpin of the largest fraud ring at Tembisa. 41 service providers in the Maumela network were under review, and assets totaling roughly R520 million could be traced to him, including high-end homes and vehicles. Maumela’s dealings first came to light in 2021 when Babita Deokaran flagged possible fraud. The SIU noted that Deokaran had identified hundreds of fraudulent payments shortly before her murder; among them were millions due to companies linked to Maumela. An investigation dubbed him the “Tembisa tender don” and described how he wielded influence over hospital management and procurement, effectively turning the hospital into a “contract factory” for his network.

The government describes Maumela’s actions as alleged corruption and fraud. No judicial finding of guilt has been made public, and Maumela has denied any wrongdoing. He has not been arrested; authorities have instead pursued civil preservation and forfeiture of assets.

== Asset seizures and investigations ==
From mid-2025 onward, multiple state agencies moved to seize Maumela’s ill-gotten assets. In September 2025, the AFU obtained preservation orders freezing nearly R400 million in Maumela’s cars and properties. These assets are luxury homes and vehicles, worth a total of “about R326 million”, including four Lamborghinis, a Bentley, and a yacht, plus apartments in wealthy suburbs. The NPA later also secured orders for assets owned by Rudolph Mazibuko (a co-accused), including Mercedes sedans and a Land Rover valued at R47 million.

On 9 October 2025 the SIU announced a landmark operation: a special tribunal granted an order to preserve R900 million in assets linked to one of the hospital fraud syndicates. SIU, Johannesburg Metro Police and Hawks simultaneously raided locations in Sandhurst (Sandton) and a car dealership in Emalahleni, Mpumalanga. By the end of day one, about R133.5 million in assets had been seized. The listed seizures included a Sandhurst property worth R70m, three Lamborghinis worth R25m, household contents and artwork, and several high-end cars, Ferrari, Aston Martin, Rolls-Royce, from the dealership.

According to the SIU’s published interim report, Maumela’s identified assets totaled about R520 million. These were largely illiquid luxury properties and vehicles. No cash amounts are publicly reported, but the ongoing operations signal that the state is moving to recover as much as possible. Thus far, the emphasis has been on asset forfeiture rather than prosecution; however, opposition parties have urged authorities to press criminal charges. The DA’s Gauteng health spokesperson Jack Bloom highlighted the R52 million Pagani Huayra Roadster hypercar purchase (with Tembisa Hospital funds) and demanded immediate charges against Maumela, accusing the government of undue delay.

== Political reactions ==
In parliament, Maumela's connection to President Ramaphosa’s family was repeatedly mentioned. In October 2025, during a parliamentary session, the EFF asked Ramaphosa to clarify his link to Maumela. Ramaphosa, who divorced Maumela’s aunt decades ago, admitted he had “encountered” Maumela once while walking in Sandhurst in 2024 and had no ongoing relationship with him. He expressed shock at the corruption allegations, saying he was “appalled at the allegations” and supported the SIU’s work to reclaim the funds.

The DA demanded the National Prosecuting Authority (NPA) file charges against Maumela, accusing officials of shielding him due to his political connections. Cosatu staged a protest outside Tembisa Hospital on 7 October 2025, on the eve of International Day for Decent Work, to condemn the “grand scale corruption” that robbed the poor of healthcare while funding luxury cars.

Civic organisations like the Organisation Undoing Tax Abuse (OUTA) and the DA’s provincial branch have been critical of the Gauteng government’s handling of the scandal. OUTA noted with alarm that numerous health department executives, including the Health MEC and Premier, seem implicated by inaction, and urged a full investigation of senior officials.

== See also ==
- Vusimuzi Matlala
- Babita Deokaran
- Madlanga Commission
