= Tembisa Hospital =

- Gauteng Department of Health

Geography
- Location: Corner Flint Mazibuko Street & Rev R.T.J. Namane Drive, Tembisa, Ekurhuleni Metropolitan Municipality, Gauteng, South Africa
- Coordinates: 25°58′58″S 28°14′12″E

Organisation
- Care system: Public
- Type: General / Tertiary

Services
- Emergency department: Yes

History
- Founded: .

Links
- Lists: Hospitals in South Africa

Tembisa Hospital is a major public hospital located in the township of Tembisa, in the Ekurhuleni Metropolitan Municipality of Gauteng, South Africa. The facility is managed by the Gauteng Department of Health and serves both the local township population (approximately 2.5 million people as of 2023) as well as surrounding areas in the municipalities of Johannesburg, Ekurhuleni and Tshwane.

Tembisa Hospital was built in 1972. It offers a broad range of general and specialised medical services typical of a provincial tertiary-level institution. It acts as a referral centre in the region and provides accident and emergency care, intensive care, surgical and medical wards, as well as outpatient follow-up for chronic conditions.

== Incidents ==
=== Fire ===
On Saturday evening 19 April 2025, a fire broke out in the hospital’s Accident and Emergency Unit, prompting the evacuation of at least 79 patients and six staff and shutting the emergency department to ambulance admissions for the time being. Further reports confirmed no casualties and noted that only the emergency wing was affected while other wards remained operational. The closure of the emergency unit forced ambulance diversion and public advisories to use nearby facilities.

=== Corruption investigation ===
In September 2025, the Special Investigating Unit (SIU) released an interim report into Tembisa Hospital, identifying three major syndicates responsible for looting more than R2 billion from the hospital’s procurement and service contracts. The investigation revealed irregular procurement practices and investigators analysed more than 2 200 bundles of purchase orders, 207 service providers traded under 4 501 purchase orders, and that payments to officials of the Gauteng Department of Health and Tembisa Hospital reached over R122 million. The Premier of Gauteng, Panyaza Lesufi, subsequently suspended the Head of Health Department, Lesiba Malotana, citing “wholesale looting” at the hospital.

The hospital has faced repeated criticism for overcrowding, infrastructure deficiencies, and service delivery challenges. In 2022 the South African Human Rights Commission noted reports of a shortage of staff, dilapidated infrastructure and severe overcrowding at the facility.

=== Corruption, whistle-blowing and arrests ===
In August 2021, Babita Deokaran, senior financial head in the Gauteng Department of Health, flagged irregular procurement transactions at Tembisa Hospital involving hundreds of millions of rand. Her whistle-blowing is widely regarded as the catalyst for the uncovering of a major fraud investigation. Tragically, she was assassinated outside her Johannesburg home on 23 August 2021; the murder of Deokaran led to national scrutiny of the hospital’s procurement practices.

Following the revelations, the Special Investigating Unit (SIU) released an interim report that implicated three major syndicates in the looting of more than R2 billion from Tembisa Hospital through irregular tenders and fraudulent procurement. Among those named were businessman Hangwani Maumela, identified as linked to over R800 million in tenders through his companies, and Rudolph Mazibuko, whose syndicate was alleged to have secured more than R283 million.

In September 2025, Hangwani Maumela was arrested in connection with a R326 million corruption probe linked to Tembisa Hospital, and his assets, including luxury properties and vehicles, were subject to seizure orders by the National Prosecuting Authority’s Asset Forfeiture Unit. In the same month the Democratic Alliance (Gauteng) welcomed asset forfeiture actions against Maumela and others such as Mazibuko, including nearly R400 million in property seizures.

In October 2025 the Gauteng Premier placed the head of the provincial health department, Lesiba Arnold Malotana, under immediate suspension, citing “wholesale looting” at Tembisa Hospital and the need to restore integrity to the health system.

The case of Deokaran’s murder continues to draw attention: although six men were arrested and later convicted for her killing, investigators and her family maintain that the “mastermind(s)” behind the hit remain at large and linked to the procurement syndicates at Tembisa Hospital.
