= Green Farm, Limpopo =

Green Farm
- Location within Limpopo Location within South Africa
- Coordinates: 22.958°S 30.759°E
- Country: South Africa
- Province: Limpopo
- District: Vhembe
- Municipality: Thulamela
  - Councillor: (ANC)

Area
  - Total: 5.94 km^{2} (2.29 sq mi)

Population (2011)
  - Total: 3,930
  - Density: 662/km^{2} (1,710/sq mi)

Racial makeup (2011)
  - Black African: 99.9%
  - Coloured: 0.1%

First languages (2011)
  - Tsonga: 97.3%
  - Venda: 1.6%
  - Other: 1.2%
- Time zone: UTC+2 (SAST)
- Postal code (street): 0982

Green Farm is a village in the province of Limpopo in South Africa. The village is situated in the north east region of Limpopo province within the newly demarcated Collins Chabane Local Municipality. It used to be part of the Thulamela local municipality, Vhembe district. The village is located

Green Farm was named Mahori after the initial chieftaincy, and it currently under the chieftaincy of the "Nhongani family".

The village is situated right in the middle of Malamulele, between Madonsi village, Gijamhandeni, Phugwani, Nkovani, Makhasa, Bobo and Xibangwa villages.

== Languages and sections of the village ==
The village is a place where the population speaks Xitsonga as a mother tongue, other languages used in the village include English as a national medium of instruction. Tshivenda, Sepedi and the nguni languages are known and used mainly by people who relocated to the village or got married there.

The area in itself is spacious with a mountain range which runs right in the middle dividing the main village into two areas, namely Endhzaku ka ntshava (behind the mountain with reference to the face being at the main road) and a henhla (meaning on top, due to the placement on the high lying area). There are new sections being established due to growth and the need for children to get their own spaces; Hunguta poto (Reduce the size of a cooking pot) and Tshumbula doki (Where donkeys sprawls - used to be open grounds)

== Seasons, climate and food ==
The area experiences a prolonged heat season, running from August to April. There is a wind season from July to August and the wind can be dusty because there is no moisture then and the grass is commonly dry leaving open grounds. The rain is most likely from October to January and this is the time where the residents plough their yards for maize, water melons, pumpkins, beans etc. In the period, there is also an abundance of fruits in the yards (Mangoes, Papawa/papaya) and you can enjoy tintoma, tinyiri or tinyiya, tintsengele, mapfilwa and later Mahodinga/ makajawa na makwakwa. The winter can be said to be warm and drizzling is possible

The village is in itself not green or fertile. Green Farm was named by the missionaries. The name has since been accepted and is used by all people young and old. The area is home to indigenous trees including amongst others the Marula tree(Nkanyi), Jackal-berry tree(Ntoma), Mopani tree(Nxanatsi) etc. Jackal-berry trees have edible fruits and the wood is used to make pestles for grinding maize. The marula trees provide fruits(makanyi) which are tasty and rich with Vitamin C. The fruit is used to make beer(vukanyi). The staple food is vuswa (pap, meal cooked with maize) and vuswa is served with any relish which can be found in the yards (guxe, theka, muxiji, tinhwembe, tinyawa) and meat type of food found in the forest e.g. bush meat, matomani(mopani worms), swidongodi or bought from the supermarkets

== Economics and demographics ==
Most people at Green Farm are unemployed. Most women are housewives, Children at school going ages attend to the schools which are situated in the village; There is a creche for toddlers and young children, A primary school named Tsundzukani and a high school named P.P Hlungwani. Most men are self-employed to support their families; from roofing (ku fulela tindlu), Construction, Welding, fencing, fishing and farming (Crop and Animal). A few percentage of residents work for the government departments and schools. Young people get registered annually at the various tertiary institutions across the country. Most graduates never returns home as residents because there are only few job or business opportunities available in the area.

== Music and arts ==
Music is a major part of vatsonga people. People at Green farm enjoy playing Xitsonga music at home and at ceremonies like tikhomba (female initiation ceremony) and xiseveseve (celebration of friendship mostly for women). Legendary artist, the late Mhani Khatisa Chabalala was resident at Greenfarm. She was an inspiration to most young Vatsonga artists. People do carving (matshuri, minkombe na swinwana), moulding (timbita and majomela) and they make the traditional clothing like tinjhovo and xibelani.

== Religion, social organisation and politics ==
The area offers the residents a choice when it comes to religious affiliation, there are different church denominations like Zion Christian Church, Apostolic Faith Mission, Assemblies of God, Roman Catholic Church and other churches. The residents also have traditional ceremonies of African religion (muphahlo na mancomani). Politically, Green Farm Village also enjoys involvement in the political landscape of the Republic of South Africa. The people in the village are well represented in the political structures. Politics have to work in synergy with the lateral by-laws and traditional regulations. The area is under the tribal leadership of Madonsi Hlungwani royal family. Looking at history, the majority of people have traditionally associated themselves with African National Congress in the previous elections. There is a strong social movement towards development; with several active and recognized organisations focusing on health and social development and education.
