= Arthur Fraser =

South African civil servant and intelligence operative

Arthur Fraser is a South African civil servant and former intelligence operative who was head of the State Security Agency from 2016 to 2018 and National Commissioner for Correctional Services from 2018 to 2021. He was previously an anti-apartheid activist in the African National Congress, a senior official in the now-defunct National Intelligence Agency, and briefly a senior official in the Department of Home Affairs.

Formerly a close ally of President Jacob Zuma, Fraser is known for his role in various political controversies, including his alleged role in leaking the spy tapes in 2009, his unconstitutional decision to grant Zuma medical parole in 2021, and his role in initiating the 2022 Farmgate scandal by making public a burglary at a private residence of President Cyril Ramaphosa. In 2022, the Zondo Commission recommended that the Hawks should investigate allegations that Fraser had abused state security resources during Zuma's presidency.

== Early life and education ==
Fraser is the younger brother of Geraldine Fraser-Moleketi, a former cabinet minister. In 1995, he earned a Bachelor's degree in film and video production from the London Institute. According to Fraser, he was active in student politics during apartheid and joined the African National Congress underground.

== Post-apartheid career ==
After the end of apartheid in 1994, Fraser returned to South Africa from exile elsewhere and in 1995 joined the newly established National Intelligence Agency (NIA). He was seconded as an investigator to the Truth and Reconciliation Commission and subsequently held other operational positions in the intelligence sector, ultimately becoming provincial head of the NIA in the Western Cape province from 1998 to 2004. He was later transferred to the Department of Home Affairs and served as Deputy Director-General with responsibility for national immigration.

=== National Intelligence Agency: 2006–2011 ===
In 2006, after one-and-a half years at Home Affairs, Fraser was reappointed to the NIA to deputise Manala Manzini as Deputy Director-General in charge of offensive and counter-intelligence operations. He held that post for five years.

During his tenure at the NIA, in 2007, Fraser was appointed by President Thabo Mbeki and the National Security Council to investigate the source of the so-called Browse Mole report, a leaked 2006 intelligence report which investigated the political base and viability of former Deputy President Jacob Zuma. Subsequently, Fraser became a central figure in the "spy tapes" saga, which concerned secretly recorded telephone conversations between Leonard McCarthy, the former head of the Scorpions, and Bulelani Ngcuka, the former head of the National Prosecuting Authority (NPA). The recordings allegedly documented prosecutorial collusion in an ongoing corruption case against Zuma in relation to the 1999 Arms Deal, and they led incumbent NPA head Mokotedi Mpshe to withdraw the charges against Zuma. The Mail & Guardian reported that the recordings were leaked to Zuma's lawyers by Fraser, who apparently had obtained them legally during the Browse Mole investigation. His alleged decision to leak them to Zuma, Mbeki's political rival, was construed as reflective of a "political flip-flop" on his part, given that he had previously been viewed as an ally of Mbeki.

In addition, in a 2017 book on state capture called The President's Keepers, investigative journalist Jacques Pauw alleged that Fraser had headed a parallel intelligence network within the NIA, the Principal Agent Network programme, which was allegedly funded by a secret slush fund and possibly involved the abuse of public funds.

=== State Security Agency: 2016–2018 ===
Fraser subsequently spent time in the private sector and, with his former boss Manala Manzini, co-founded a private security company called Resurgent Risk Managers. In later years an investigation by the National Treasury implicated the company in possible corruption at the public Passenger Rail Agency of South Africa (Prasa), with which the company had a contract.

In September 2016, Jacob Zuma, then in his second term as President, appointed Fraser as Director-General of the State Security Agency (SSA), which had superseded the NIA in 2009. The opposition Democratic Alliance objected strongly to his appointment, citing his involvement in various "political intrigue and irregularities", including the alleged leaking of the spy tapes. At the agency, he was known as a "key associate" and ally of Zuma.

He was later implicated in possible mishandling of SSA funds: the report of the Zondo Commission described Fraser's tenure at the SSA as defined by a lack of accountability, saying that Fraser had been a "law unto himself". The head of the commission, Justice Raymond Zondo, also recommended that the Hawks should reopen their investigation into the Principal Agent Network. Indeed, the commission found that an earlier criminal investigation into Fraser had been halted by the former Minister of State Security, Siyabonga Cwele, "apparently on the instructions of President Zuma". Fraser denied any misconduct and described the commission's findings as baseless.

=== Correctional Services Commissioner: 2018–2021 ===
In April 2018, newly elected President Cyril Ramaphosa moved Fraser from the SSA to the Department of Correctional Services, where he became National Commissioner. He held that position from 17 April 2018 to 25 September 2021, when his contract expired without being renewed. During his tenure, Fraser controversially approved medical parole for former President Zuma after the latter had served only two months of a 15-month term of imprisonment for contempt of court. Fraser overruled the Medical Parole Advisory Board in doing so, according to him because he was concerned about Zuma's age, his status as a former president, the inability of the department to care adequately for him, and the risk of a resurgence of the civil unrest that had followed his initial arrest in 2021. In November 2022, the Supreme Court of Appeal confirmed an earlier high court judgement in ruling that Fraser's decision had been unlawful and unconstitutional.

== Farmgate ==
On 1 June 2022, in his capacity as a private citizen, Fraser laid a criminal complaint against President Ramaphosa, alleging that Ramaphosa was guilty of criminal conduct in connection with a 2020 robbery at his Phala Phala farm. In doing so, Fraser made the robbery public for the first time, initiating a prolonged media and political scandal that came to be known as Farmgate.
