= Jacques Pauw =

South African investigative journalist

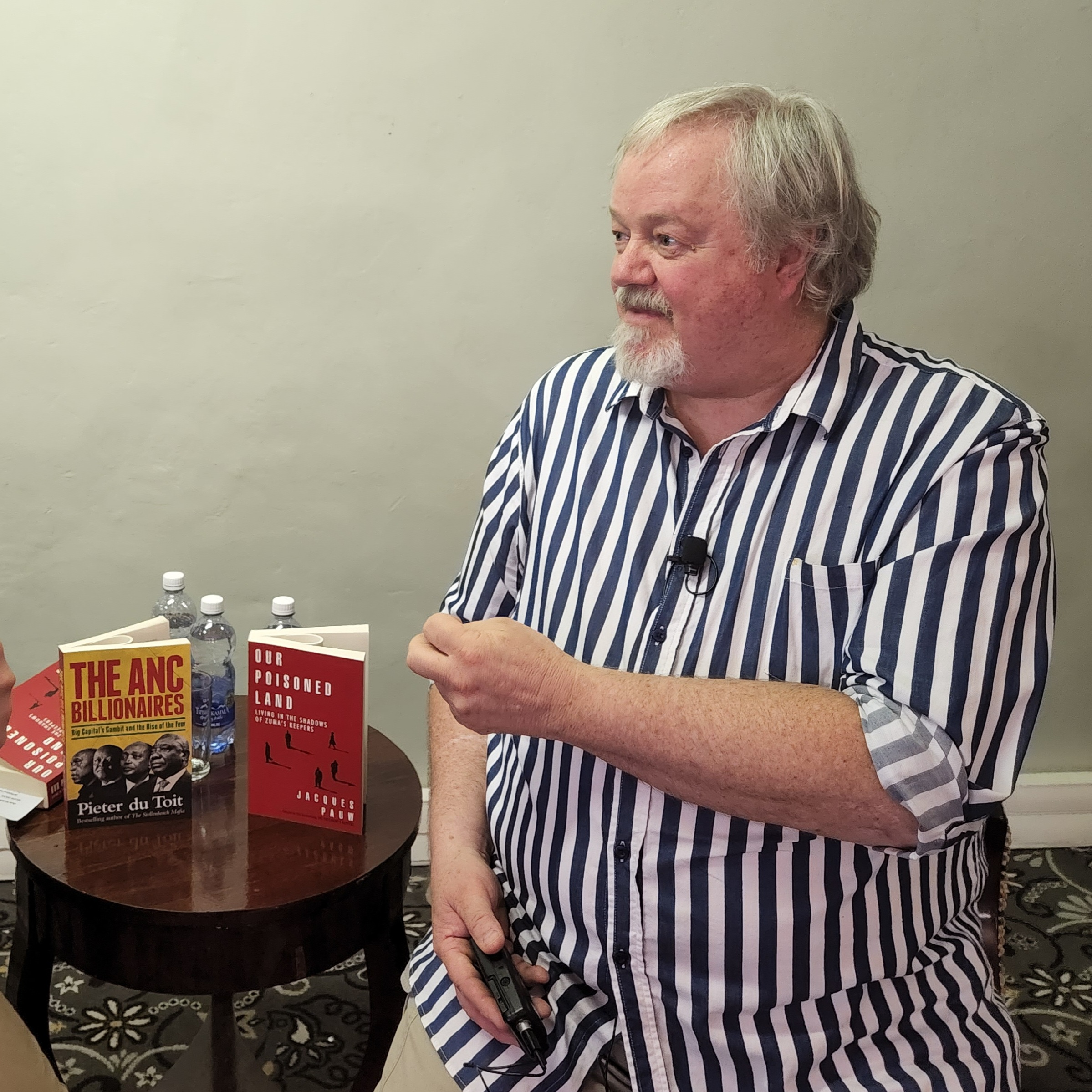
- Jacques Pauw at the launch of his 2022 book "Our Poisoned Land."
- Occupation: Investigative journalist
- Notable work: The President's Keepers, Vrye Weekblad

Jacques Pauw is a South African investigative journalist who was an executive producer of the Special Assignment current affairs programme on SABC. Pauw was a founding member and assistant editor of the anti-apartheid Afrikaans newspaper Vrye Weekblad. He began his television career in 1994, specializing in documentaries around the African continent.

Throughout his journalistic career, Pauw investigated lethal criminal activities in the underworld of southern Africa and exposed atrocities committed by governments around the African continent. Affairs covered by Pauw's documentaries include the Rwandan genocide, the War in Darfur, and the police death squads in South Africa under apartheid.

In November 2017, South Africa's state security agency (SSA) brought criminal charges against Pauw because of claims made in his book, "The President's Keepers." His house was raided by the South African police in February 2018.

== Retirement ==
In 2014, Jacques Pauw retired from journalism. He was the Head of Investigations at Media24 newspapers at the time. He had been a journalist for three decades, before the three-year break after retirement during which he (and his wife) started and ran a restaurant. Pauw spent most of that time as the chef at the restaurant, Red Tin Roof, in Riebeek-Kasteel

== Recognition and honors ==
Pauw's work has been shown around the world and he has received several national and international awards, including the Award for Outstanding International Investigative Reporting, the Media Institute of Southern Africa's award for investigative journalism and the Young African Leadership Award.

Twice Pauw has been named as CNN's African Journalist of the Year and he has also received the Vodacom Journalist of the Year Award in South Africa. In 2007 he won the Nat Nakasa Award for Media Integrity.

== Books ==
Pauw has authored and published several books from 1991 to 2017:

- Our Poisoned Land: Living in the Shadows of Zuma’s Keepers (2022)
- The President's Keepers: Those Keeping Zuma in Power and out of Prison (2017)
- Rat Roads: One Man’s Incredible Journey (2012)
- Little Ice-Cream Boy (2009)
- Dances with Devils: A Journalist’s Search for Truth (2007)
- Into the Heart of Darkness: Confessions of Apartheid’s Assassins (1997)
- In the Heart of the Whore: The Story of Apartheid’s Death Squads (1991)
