= Greek Wikipedia =

Greek-language edition of Wikipedia

- Website type: Internet encyclopedia project
- Available in: Greek
- Owner: Wikimedia Foundation
- Website: el.wikipedia.org
- Commercial: No
- Registration: Optional
- Users: 528,614
- Launched: 1 December 2002; 23 years ago
- Current status: Active
- Content license: Creative Commons Attribution/ Share-Alike 4.0 (most text also dual-licensed under GFDL); Media licensing varies

The Greek Wikipedia (also Hellenic Wikipedia, Elliniki Vikipedia, Greek: Ελληνική Βικιπαίδεια) is the Greek-language edition of Wikipedia, a free online encyclopedia. It was started on 1 December 2002. It surpassed the 10,000 article mark on 16 May 2006, the 100,000 article mark on 9 April 2014, and the 200,000 article mark on 27 November 2021. As of September 2026, it has 273,035 articles.

The Greek Wikipedia community has organized some meetups as well. Since 2011, the Wikimedia Community User Group Greece, the national affiliate of Wikimedia Foundation for Greece, has been organising events to promote Greek Wikipedia, supporting the growth of the project and bringing in new editors through outreach. Greek Wikipedia is the main free internet encyclopedia written in Greek. By 2018, Greek Wikipedia's pageviews surpassed the 250 million mark annually.

== Statistics ==
Origin of views (January 2021)
Greece	72%
Cyprus	3%
Germany	1%
Other	24%

As of 19 September 2026, the Greek Wikipedia:

- is 45th-largest by number of articles (273,035)
- has 22 administrators
- has 528,614 registered users, of whom 2,290 were active
- has 11,822,019 edits

As of May 2019, Greek Wikipedia is usually visited by 5,500,000 to 6,500,000 unique devices per month, while the unique devices per day are approximately 440,000.

The origin of pageviews is mainly from Greece. The remainder of the pageviews comes from Cyprus, Germany, United States, United Kingdom and other countries. As of May 2019, Greece is the source for the bulk of the pageviews, being the source for nearly 27,000,000 pageviews out of 32,500,000 on the same month.

As of May 2019, Greek Wikipedia receives approximately 30,000,000 pageviews per month, with a peak at winter months. Together with an increasing number of articles and improvements on quality, the pageviews have improved substantially in the last three years.

Since 2017, the annual article growth amounts to 15,000 articles annually, while the average monthly growth amounts to 1,020-1,300 articles per month. In 2021 a new record of new articles has been reached, as more than 17,000 articles have been created since the beginning of the year, while the previous record was with 16,510 in 2017. Users with at least one edit during 2021 are expected to surpass 8,500, while in 2020 it was 8,012 and 7,453 in 2019.

The daily pageviews of Greek Wikipedia vary within the year; peaking in the winter period (late November to mid March), while the months with the least page views are usually June, July and August.

== History ==
=== Early years ===
Greek Wikipedia was created on 1 December 2002. At the first months of existence, the new articles were very small and a handful of users were contributing, some of them just adding interwikis to other Wikipedias. The first WikiProject was launched in November 2005. Its main competitor at the time was LivePedia, started in 2004, which had more than 100,000 articles. Many articles of Livepedia were republished articles from donations of various publishing houses and the site was also a wiki. Approximately 250 articles are coming at least partially from Livepedia, thanks to the Livepedia's use of GFDL until 1 November 2008.

=== Article count ===
The Greek Wikipedia was created on 4 December 2002. On 16 May 2006 it reached 10,000 articles. On 10 October 2006 it reached 15,000 articles, while on 17 March 2007 it reached 20,000 articles. On this period there were 30 new articles being created every day, while there were 50 active users. In December of that year the Greek Wikipedia reached 30,000 articles, while on 14 February 2009 it reached 40,000 articles. Fourteen months later, on 10 April 2010, it reached 50,000 articles; eleven months later, on 8 March 2011 it reached 60,000 articles. In February 2012 it had 70,000 articles, while 252 days later it reached 80,000 articles.

In July 2013, it reached 90,000 articles, while 271 days later it reached 100,000 articles, while 195 days later it reached 110,000 articles. On 11 July 2016, after 629 days, it reached 120,000 articles, due to the general recount of late March 2015 which removed several thousand redirects from mainspace. As a result, the article count fell to 105,500 articles, while before the recount the article count was 119,500 articles. Greek Wikipedia is maintaining a pace of growth of around 15,000 articles per year. This trends are generally stable since 2017, when previously Greek Wikipedia had usually 10,000 to 25,000 articles.

Number of articles	Date	Days intervening
1	1 December 2002	
10,000	16 May 2006	1262
20,000	17 March 2007	305
30,000	27 December 2007	285
40,000	14 February 2009	415
50,000	10 April 2010	420
60,000	8 March 2011	332
70,000	22 February 2012	351
80,000	1 November 2012	254
90,000	12 July 2013	252
100,000	9 April 2014	271
110,000	21 October 2014	195
120,000	11 July 2016	629
130,000	18 April 2017	281
140,000	23 November 2017	219
150,000	1 August 2018	250
160,000	17 March 2019	227
170,000	9 November 2019	238
180,000	24 July 2020	259
190,000	21 March 2021	249
200,000	27 November 2021	251
210,000	7 May 2022	

== Users and editors ==
Greek Wikipedia statistics
Number of user accounts	Number of articles	Number of files	Number of administrators
528614	273035	20067	22

== Logos ==
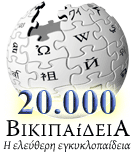
Greek Wikipedia's 20,000 articles special logo

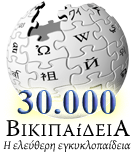
Greek Wikipedia's 30,000 articles special logo

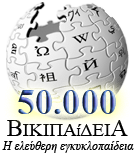
Greek Wikipedia's 50,000 articles special logo

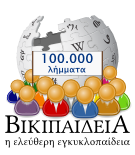
Greek Wikipedia's 100,000 articles special logo (9 April 2014)

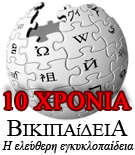
Special logo for the 10-year anniversary since the foundation of Greek Wikipedia

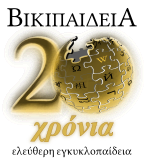
Special logo for the 20-year anniversary since the foundation of Greek Wikipedia

== In the press ==
In the press, Wikipedia has been referred as a good source of information; however, periodically it has been criticised for having a non-neutral point of view in politics-related articles. Also, Greek Wikipedia has received extensive coverage from the Greek-language press for some of its actions, such as the anniversary of 10 years since its opening. In addition to, full articles of Greek Wikipedia or parts of them are often included in news articles and other websites in the Greek language.
