= Murder of Babita Deokaran =

2021 murder in Johannesburg, South Africa

- Date: 23 August 2021
- Time: around 08:00 SAST
- Venue: Outside the home of the victim
- Location: Winchester Hills, Johannesburg South, Gauteng Province, South Africa; 26°16′29″S 28°01′19″E
- Cause: Shooting
- Motive: Assassination of a witness in a corruption investigation
- Deaths: 1
- Arrests: 6
- Suspects: 1. Nhlanganiso Ndlovu; 2. Siphakanyisa Dladla; 3. Zitha Radebe; 4. Simphiwe Mazibuko; 5. Sanele Mbele; 6. Phakamani Radebe

Babita Deokaran was a South African whistleblower murdered for reporting corruption at the Gauteng Department of Health where she was working as the acting chief director financial accounting officer.

== The murder ==
Deokaran was shot and killed at around 08:00 SAST on 23 August 2021 while she was returning home from dropping her daughter off at school. A vehicle pulled alongside her vehicle and fired multiple shots after she had parked in front of her house in Johannesburg South, Gauteng Province, South Africa resulting in her death. The case caused significant controversy in South Africa given Deokaran's status as an anti-corruption whistleblower and the lack of protection afforded to her by the state. At the time of her death Deokaran was the acting chief financial officer at the Gauteng Provincial Government Department of Health.

It was reported in the media that her death was linked to a corrupt COVID-19 PPE procurement scandal to the value of R332 million (equivalent to US$20 million) within the Gauteng Provincial Department of Health. An official from the South African Special Investigating Unit confirmed that Deokaran was a key witness in the investigation to expose a syndicate setup to benefit from state corruption. Deokaran had been on special leave for more than a year prior to her death whilst the investigation was underway.

== Investigation ==
A neighbour informed the police that he had seen a suspicious BMW at the murder location multiple times before the event. This information enabled the authorities to trace the vehicle to a former member of the South African National Defence Force living in the Pretoria area and resulted in the arrest of six suspects. A passenger in Deokaran's vehicle at the time of the murder also provided important evidence leading to the arrests. The Sunday Times reported that Deokaran had been stalked and observed by her alleged assassins for more than a month prior to her death. The Sunday Times report also stated that CCTV cameras in the area had been mysteriously disabled just prior to the assassination whilst sophisticated surveillance software might have been used to monitor Deokaran's mobile phone and track her movements.

The six suspects were reported by the media to have been hired assassins with Cape Talk reporting that they were allegedly paid R2 million. News24 reported that the following suspects had been arrested Nhlanganiso Ndlovu, Siphakanyisa Dladla, Zitha Radebe, Simphiwe Mazibuko, Sanele Mbele, Phakamani Radebe, three days after the attack; they also reported that more arrests were likely in the future. Due to water supply issues affecting the Johannesburg Magistrate's Court, the bail hearing was postponed to 30 November 2021.

Following Deokaran's death the chief executive of Tembisa hospital and the provincial Department of Health chief financial officer were suspended.

Phakamani Radebe alleged that former health minister Zweli Mkhize paid them R400 000 each for the hit, but later retracted the statement. New evidence may reveal the mastermind of the Babita's murder.

== Media coverage ==
Deokaran's murder received considerable attention in the media. The Daily Maverick published an editorial questioning why public officials received generous protection details whilst witnesses who blow the whistle on serious acts of corruption, like Deokaran, received no protection thereby raising questions about the South African government's commitment to fighting corruption in South Africa. Following her death South African president Cyril Ramaphosa stated that more state protection should be afforded to whistleblowers in the fight against corruption.

A News24 investigation concluded that African National Congress (ANC) Ekurhuleni treasurer-general Sello Sekhokho ran a number of businesses that were allegedly involved in corrupt dealings with the Gauteng Department of Health. News24 reported that Deokaran raised concerns over the nature of these dealings shortly before her assassination. Sekhokho denied the News24 allegations.

== Convictions ==
The six men involved in the assassination were sentenced in the Johannesburg High Court to a combined 95 years imprisonment on the eve of the second anniversary of the assassination. Hadebe and Mbhele were sentenced to 22 years imprisonment on charges of murder. Radebe and Mazibuko were sentenced to 15 years for murder. Dladla was sentenced to 8 years for murder and 7 years imprisonment on charges of possession of a firearm and ammunition (15 years in total). Ndlovu was sentenced to 6 years imprisonment for murder.

== Aftermath ==
The six men involved implicated three more men. One of the three, Khanyisani Mpungose, was killed in Germiston, four months after Deokaran's assassination.

== Developments (2024-2026) ==
The Special Investigating Unit (SIU) says it is in the final stages of its investigation into the murder and related procurement syndicates. In July 2025, SIU head Advocate Andy Mothibi told the public broadcaster investigators are “finalising the investigation” and assembling the last pieces of evidence.

The SIU and other reporting say the Deokaran probe has uncovered multiple syndicates involved in looting tender funds at Tembisa and other facilities; the SIU has referred matters for further action and disciplinary steps in the health department. Vusimuzi Matlala, whom Deokaran's team identified millions of rand spent on goods and services for Tembisa hospital from his companies Black AK Trading & Suppliers and Cor Kabeng Trading & Suppliers, and proposed fraud charges against the firms, is arrested in 2025 in connection with other chargers.

Although the six triggermen were convicted, investigators and the family emphasize that the people who organised/contracted the killing have not been brought to book; the family continues to press for arrests. Political parties and civil society are publicly renewing calls for law-enforcement to find the organisers. There have been allegations about how the killing was carried out and questions about previous investigative handling. News24 alleges that the Hawks once had a triggerman in custody and released him, which has generated renewed scrutiny of police processes. The reporting is part of an ongoing investigative strand into corruption and the case.

Government and the Minister of Health, Joe Phaahla, publicly welcomed the guilty pleas and sentencing when they occurred and have pointed to ongoing work to finalise investigations and protect whistle-blowers; the SIU has said it supports further police/NPA action to trace masterminds. In September 2025, the Special Investigating Unit released its interim report following an investigation into allegations of looting and maladministration at Tembisa Hospital. One of the individuals who scored big on tenders is Hangwani Maumela, who had scored at least R415 million via contracts awarded by Tembisa Hospital. Maumela is President Cyril Ramaphosa's nephew from a previous marriage.

In January 2026, Whatsapp messages that might be referring to Babita before her assassination came to light between Vusimuzi Matlala and Kwazulu Natal Hawk's head, Lesetja Senosa. Senosa mentioned to the Madlanga commission that Matlala was his brother since meeting him at his wedding in 2019. During his testimony at the Madlanga Commission in August 2026, Vusimuzi Matlala admitted to being friends with Hangwani Maumela and that he was at some point a director of his security company called CAT VIP Protection.

In August 2026, Stefan Joel Govindraju, one of the suspects in the Tembisa corruption, was arrested at O.R. Tambo International Airport while returning from an overseas trip. He appeared in court and was granted bail of R200 000.

== See also ==
- Madlanga Commission
- Vusimuzi Matlala
- Hangwani Maumela

== External sources ==
- Wicks, Jeff. The Shadow State: Why Babita Deokaran had to die (8 August 2025), published by Tafelberg, Cape Town, ISBN 978-0624094951
- Silenced: Why Babita Deokaran was murdered (15 October 2025), News24, YouTube documentary.
