= Hilton Dennis =

South African civil servant

Hilton Anthony Dennis

Personal details
- Born: 28 August 1958 (age 67) Ixopo, Natal
- Party: African National Congress

Hilton Anthony Dennis (born 28 August 1958) is a South African civil servant who first saw service with the African National Congress (ANC) in exile in military and intelligence roles and after 1994 with various reformed intelligence services in the new South African government. He was an ambassador for South Africa in the Department of International Relations and Cooperation.

== Early life ==
Dennis was born on 28 August 1958 in Ixopo, Kwa-Zulu Natal, South Africa. He completed his Matric in 1976 at the Little Flower School in Ixopo. In 1977 he attended the University of Western Cape (UWC) studying for a bachelor's degree in Law but failed to complete it due to his involvement in political activities. Those activities forced him into exile and he left the country and joined the ANC in 1980.

== Exile ==
By 1981, he was in Angola receiving military training with Umkhonto we Sizwe (MK), the armed wing of the ANC. As part of the ANC's Department of National Intelligence and Security, he then received counter-intelligence training from 1982 by the Stasi in the German Democratic Republic. In 1983, he was appointed the ANC's Counter-Intelligence representative in Tanzania and in 1984 redeployed to Lusaka, Zambia as a counter-intelligence analyst. From 1987 until 1990, his role was as head of the counter-intelligence investigation unit in Lusaka in the renamed Department of Intelligence and Security. After the unbanning of the ANC, he returned to South Africa in 1991 and served with the organisation in KwaZulu-Natal during the negotiation period leading up to the first democratic elections in South Africa in 1994.

== Career after 1994 ==
Following the 1994 democratic elections in South Africa, in 1995 Dennis joined the National Intelligence Agency now known as the Domestic Intelligence Service of the State Security Agency. He found himself in the role of Deputy General Manager, Counter Espionage. By 1998 he had been promoted to General Manager, Counter Espionage tasked with the organising the service's strategic approach and management of counter-intelligence. He was then promoted to the position of Director-General of the South African Secret Service in 1999 replacing Billy Masetlha who was moved to other areas of the civil service. Dennis remained with South African Security Service, now known as the Foreign Intelligence Service of the State Security Agency, until 2009. In 2010, Hilton Dennis was appointed South African Ambassador to the Republic of Korea, a position he held until the end of 2014.
