= Sizakele Sigxashe =

South African intelligence officer

Sizakele Sigxashe OMBS

Director-General of the National Intelligence Agency
- In office 1 January 1995 – 20 October 1999
- President: Nelson Mandela
- Preceded by: Position established
- Succeeded by: Vusi Mavimbela

Personal details
- Born: Sizakele Whitmore Sigxashe; 21 June 1937
- Died: 14 December 2011 (aged 74)
- Party: African National Congress
- Other political affiliations: South African Communist Party
- Education: University of Fort Hare; Kiev Institute of National Economy (PhD)

Sizakele Whitmore Sigxashe (21 June 1937 – 14 December 2011) was a South African anti-apartheid activist and intelligence officer. He was the inaugural director-general of the post-apartheid National Intelligence Agency between 1995 and 1999.

During apartheid, Sigxashe worked for the African National Congress (ANC) in exile, notably as head of intelligence evaluation for Umkhonto we Sizwe's Department of National Intelligence and Security between 1983 and 1990. During this period, he was also a member of the ANC's National Executive Committee and of the Central Committee of the South African Communist Party.

== Early life and activism ==
Sigxashe was born on 21 June 1937. He attended the University of Fort Hare and joined the African National Congress (ANC), an anti-apartheid organisation, in 1959. The ANC was banned by the apartheid government in 1960 and regrouped in exile elsewhere in Southern Africa; Sigxashe himself entered exile in 1964, soon after the Rivonia Trial. Thereafter, he travelled to the Soviet Union, where the ANC sent him for military training and where he completed his PhD in economics.

Upon his return to Southern Africa, Sigxashe joined the ANC's armed wing, Umkhonto we Sizwe (MK), in 1970. He lived in Tanzania, where he worked as a lecturer at the University of Dar es Salaam and did underground work for the ANC.

== Apartheid-era intelligence career ==
In 1978, Sigxashe joined MK's intelligence arm, the Department of National Intelligence and Security (NAT), as a military intelligence researcher; he also served as a member of the ANC's Revolutionary Council and later its Politico-Military Council. During the same period, he was a member of the exiled South African Communist Party, eventually gaining election to its Central Committee in 1984. The Mail & Guardian later described Sigxashe's role in MK as the role of "one of its low-key background boys rather than a high-profile activist".

In 1983, Sigxashe was appointed to a senior position in NAT, then led by Mzwai Piliso. He succeeded Simon Makana as head of the processing and information sub-directorate, one of three main wings of NAT; his sub-directorate was renamed as the Central Intelligence Evaluation Sector (CIES). In that capacity, in 1984, Sigxashe was appointed – with Aziz Pahad and Mtu Jwili – to Hermanus Loots's Stuart Commission, which investigated the causes of the Mkatashinga mutiny in MK's camp at Viana, Angola.

At the ANC's national consultative conference in Kabwe, Zambia in mid-1985, Sigxashe was formally elected to the ANC's 28-member National Executive Committee. The same conference resolved to overhaul NAT, suspending the Piliso-led directorate; Sigxashe remained head of CIES in the new provisional directorate (later renamed the Department of Intelligence and Security), and his permanent appointment to that position was confirmed in 1987, when Joe Nhlanhla formally took over Piliso's role as overall NAT director. He held the position until 1990, when MK's military activities were suspended amid developments in the negotiations to end apartheid.

== Post-apartheid intelligence career ==
After the end of apartheid in 1994, Nelson Mandela's government executed a restructuring of the state security services under the Intelligence Services Act of 1994. The restructuring saw several apartheid-era domestic intelligence agencies, including the National Intelligence Service, amalgamated into a new National Intelligence Agency (NIA). In 1995, Mandela appointed Sigxashe as the inaugural director-general of the NIA. Sigxashe presided over a tumultuous period at the NIA. In October 1995, one of his deputies, Muziwendoda Mdluli, was shot dead in an apparent suicide that some viewed as a murder; and Sigxashe reportedly had an unhappy relationship with the Minister of Intelligence, his former MK comrade Joe Nhlanhla.

In the June 1999 general election, Mandela was succeeded as president by Thabo Mbeki, who announced on 20 October 1999 that his former security adviser, Vusi Mavimbela, would replace Sigxashe as director-general of the NIA. The government explained the change by pointing out that Sigxashe would reach retirement age in 2000; the opposition Democratic Party welcomed his removal from the position. He was retained as a special adviser to Minister Nhlanhla.

In 2003, Sigxashe was appointed as chairperson of the Intelligence Services Council, which was established to advise Lindiwe Sisulu, Nhlanhla's successor as Intelligence Minister, on employment conditions and policies in the intelligence community.

== Personal life and death ==
Sigxashe was married and had children. In October 1995, while Sigxashe was NIA Director-General, the South African Police Service intervened in a domestic quarrel at his home; the NIA denied media reports that the police had been summoned after Sigxashe threatened to shoot his wife and children, suggesting that journalists were being fed false information amid internecine battles in the intelligence community.

Sigxashe died on 14 December 2011.

== Honours ==
On 28 April 2016, President Jacob Zuma admitted Sigxashe posthumously to the Order of Mendi. He was awarded the Order of Mendi for Bravery in Silver for "His excellent contribution to the fight against the oppression of the people of South Africa".
