= South African National Academy of Intelligence =

The Intelligence Academy formerly known as the South African National Academy of Intelligence (SANAI) is responsible for training the members of the South African intelligence services and agencies. The South African National Academy of Intelligence is a part of the State Security Agency.

== History ==
Prior to the creation of the National Intelligence Agency and South African Secret Service in 1995, the old National Intelligence Service (NIS) created in 1980, had established an Intelligence Academy at its Farm, the NIS facility south-east of Pretoria. This would be where the intelligence officers of the two new organisations created in 1995, were trained prior to the establishment of a new academy.

SANAI was established in February 2003, and officially opened by Jacob Zuma on 28 February and comprises an academic faculty, an intelligence research institute as well as an education, training and development support component. The campus of SANAI is located in the town of Mafikeng and is known as the Mzwandile Piliso Campus. Mzwandile Piliso was a previous head of the exiled ANC's Department of National Intelligence and Security. This campus used to be owned by the Bophuthatswana Intelligence Service, which was one of the then statutory services amalgamated into the National Intelligence Agency and the South African Secret Service in 1995. In 2006, the principal of the academy was Mr. Mphakama Mbete.

== Organisational branches ==
The South African National Academy of Intelligence is organized into three branches:

- Academic Faculty
- Intelligence Research Institute
- Education, Training and Development Support.

== Legislation ==
The National Academy of Intelligence is governed by the following legislation:

- Intelligence Services Act 65 of 2002,
- Public Service Act, 103 of 1994,
- Public Finance Management Act, 1 of 1999,
- South African Qualifications Act of 1995.
