= Moe Shaik =

South African spy and diplomat

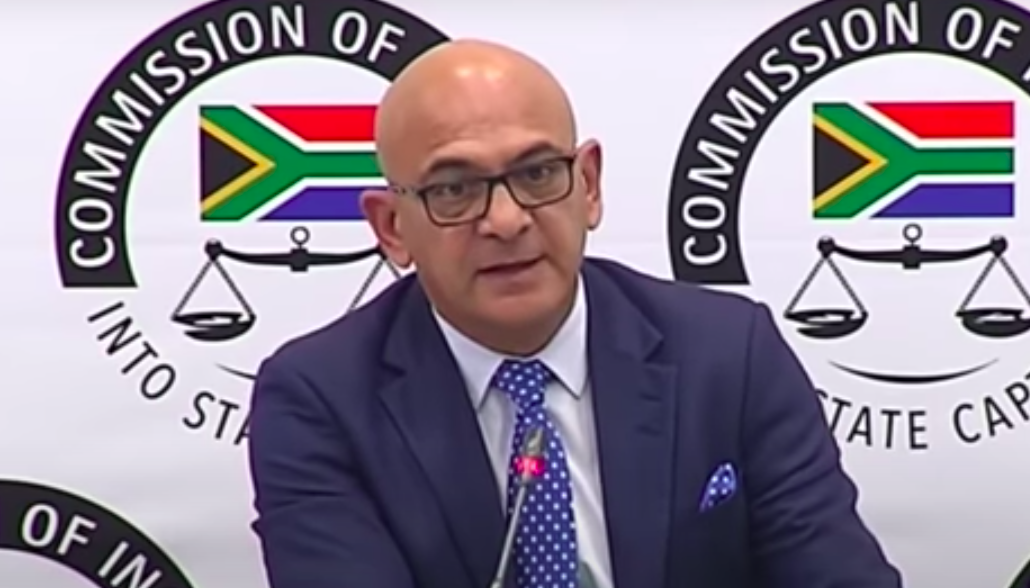
- Shaik at the Zondo Commission in November 2019
- Born: Riaz Shaik; 1958 or 1959 (age 67–68); Johannesburg, Transvaal; Union of South Africa
- Other name: Mo Shaik
- Education: University of Durban-Westville
- Known for: Operation Vula operative; Head of the South African Secret Service
- Political party: African National Congress
- Relatives: Schabir Shaik (brother); Chippy Shaik (brother); Yunus Shaik (brother)

Riaz "Moe" Shaik (born 1958 or 1959), also spelled Mo Shaik, is a South African civil servant, diplomat, businessman, and former intelligence operative who has been the South African High Commissioner to Canada since 2022. He is a former chief of the National Intelligence Co-ordinating Committee and a former director of the foreign intelligence wing of the State Security Agency, at that time still called the South African Secret Service.

During apartheid, Shaik practiced as an optometrist and worked in the underground structures of the African National Congress (ANC) in Natal province, reporting to Umkhonto weSizwe commander Jacob Zuma. He was known for his work in ANC intelligence, particularly as part of Operation Vula. In the post-apartheid period, he worked as a special adviser to Nkosazana Dlamini-Zuma in the Ministry of Foreign Affairs and Lindiwe Sisulu in the Ministry of Human Settlements, Water and Sanitation.

Shaik was also a key political ally of Zuma, who was elected President in 2009 and appointed Shaik to lead the South African Secret Service in October 2009. He left the position in February 2012 due to his poor relationship with Siyabonga Cwele, Zuma's Minister of State Security.

== Early life and education ==
Shaik was born in 1958 or 1959 in Johannesburg, in the former Transvaal, and grew up in Durban in the former Natal province. His father, Lambie, was an upholsterer, a Muslim, and an Indian South African from Pietermaritzburg in Natal; his mother, Rabia, was half-white and died in a car accident when he was a child. He is one of six brothers: his elder brothers are Salim, Faisal, Schabir, and Yunus, and his younger brother is Chippy.

The Shaik brothers lived in a Coloured area of Durban but attended a school designated for Indians under the strict racial classifications of apartheid South Africa. After matriculating, Shaik earned a bachelor's degree in computer science from the University of Durban-Westville, where he became involved in student politics and the Natal Indian Congress. He also received a master's degree in optometry.

== Early career ==
In the 1980s, Shaik practiced optometry in Durban while working secretly for the anti-apartheid African National Congress (ANC). His brother Yunus recruited him into the ANC in the early 1980s, inducting him into an underground intelligence cell that reported to the ANC's southern command in Swaziland. Jacob Zuma was Shaik's direct superior in the chain of command of the ANC's armed wing, Umkhonto weSizwe (MK).

In 1985, Shaik and Yunus were arrested by the Security Branch of the South African Police; they were detained without trial under the Internal Security Act and were held in solitary confinement for nine months, during which Shaik said he was tortured by police officers. According to Shaik, he and Yunus had allowed themselves to be arrested in order to provide a decoy while MK commander Ebrahim Ismail Ebrahim was smuggled across the South African border.

Some time in 1986 after his release, Shaik was visited at his optometry practice by a Security Branch officer who had met the Shaik brothers in jail and who offered to provide the ANC with access to confidential Security Branch files. In subsequent years, Shaik became the handler of the Security Branch double agent, who was nicknamed Nightingale, in an MK operation codenamed Operation Bible. Operation Bible was later incorporated into Operation Vula and while running it Shaik was sent by the ANC to receive intelligence training in East Germany. When the Security Branch uncovered Operation Vula in 1990, Shaik went underground and remained in hiding until South African President F. W. de Klerk indemnified all Vula operatives in 1991.

In the negotiations that ended apartheid, Shaik was a member of the ANC's delegation to the Convention for a Democratic South Africa. Ronnie Kasrils praised his contribution to the negotiations and to the security legislation drafted during the talks. In 1994, he was a member of the Transitional Executive Council and was on the sub-council on intelligence that restructured South Africa's intelligence services for the post-apartheid era.

== Post-apartheid career ==
Until 1996, Shaik was the chief of the National Intelligence Co-ordinating Committee, one of the most senior positions in the post-apartheid intelligence sector. He went on to be head of ministerial services in the Ministry of Intelligence Services and from 1997 as Deputy Coordinator of Intelligence Services.

In 1998, he was appointed South African Consul-General to Hamburg, Germany; he later became the South African Ambassador to Algeria under President Thabo Mbeki. From 2003 to 2004, he worked in the Department of Foreign Affairs, both as head of the department's policy research and analysis unit and as special adviser to Nkosazana Dlamini-Zuma, who was Minister of Foreign Affairs at the time.

=== Support for Jacob Zuma ===
Shaik was widely identified as a personal friend, close associate, and political supporter of his former MK comrade Jacob Zuma during and after the latter's tenure as Deputy President of South Africa from 1999 to 2005. In 2003, after Bulelani Ngcuka of the National Prosecuting Authority revealed publicly that Zuma had been investigated for corruption, Shaik and Mac Maharaj, another Zuma ally, told the press that Ngcuka had probably been an apartheid spy. The basis for the claim was an Operation Bible file opened on Ngcuka in the late 1980s. The claim was found untrue by a specially appointed commission of inquiry, the Hefer Commission, and in 2020 Shaik said that he regretted having made the allegation.

In 2004–2005, Shaik's brother, Schabir, was prosecuted for fraud and corruption in relation to improper payments made by Schabir to Zuma in connection with the 1999 Arms Deal. During the trial, Shaik was a spokesman for his family and defended Schabir in the press. He also was chief executive of CorpAfrica, which managed the affairs of Schabir's company, Nkobi Group, during his trial.

It was also reported that Shaik had played a key role as an adviser to Zuma during Zuma's successful campaign to be elected as ANC President at the party's 52nd National Conference in December 2007. According to the Sunday Times, between 2005 and 2007 Shaik "built a formidable network" of volunteers and donors to underwrite Zuma's presidential campaign. It was also rumoured that Shaik and an associate, Cyril Beeka, co-owned the Elexions Agency, the company which administered the election at the conference; Shaik strongly denied the rumours.

=== State Security Agency ===
When Zuma was elected President of South Africa in the 2009 general election, the Mail & Guardian reported that Shaik was considered a frontrunner for two high-profile posts in the public service: the Director-General in the Department of Foreign Affairs or the Director-General of the National Intelligence Agency. Instead, on 2 October 2009, Shaik was appointed head of the South African Secret Service, the foreign intelligence wing of the new State Security Agency. The Democratic Alliance and the Freedom Front Plus, both opposition parties, condemned his appointment, primarily because of Shaik's perceived political links to Zuma. During his tenure in the position, Shaik was named in leaked American diplomatic cables, written before his appointment in 2009.

Shaik resigned from the State Security Agency in February 2012, following months of reports that he had fallen out with Siyabonga Cwele, the Minister of State Security. He confirmed this in 2019; he said that one source of tension had been Cwele's instruction to abort an intelligence investigation into the Gupta family, who later were widely suspected of involvement in state capture under Zuma's administration.

=== Later positions ===
In August 2012, the Development Bank of Southern Africa announced that Shaik had been appointed as chief executive of its new subsidiary, Development Bank International. The Sunday Times reported that his appointment had been facilitated by Pravin Gordhan, who was the Minister of Finance and oversaw the bank, on behalf of Zuma's presidential office.

In January 2020, Shaik and Menzi Simelane were appointed as special advisers to Lindiwe Sisulu, who was then the Minister of Human Settlements, Water and Sanitation. The following month, he resigned because of the controversy his appointment had caused.

After the end of Zuma's term as president in 2018, Shaik spoke publicly about his relationship with Zuma, including in testimony to the Zondo Commission, and was critical of Zuma's conduct while in office.

Since 2022 he has been High Commissioner to Canada.

== The ANC Spy Bible ==
In 2020, Shaik published an autobiography, The ANC Spy Bible: Surviving Across Enemy Lines, which he co-wrote with Mike Nicol.

== Personal life ==
Shaik is married and has at least one child.
