= Intelligence Services Act, 1994 =

South African legislation

Parliament of South Africa
- Long title: Act to regulate the establishment, organisation and control of the National Intelligence Agency and the South African Secret Service; and to provide for matters connected therewith.
- Citation: Act No. 38 of 1994
- Enacted by: Parliament of South Africa
- Assented to: 23 November 1994

Repealed by
- Intelligence Services Act, 2002
- Status: Repealed

The Intelligence Services Act (also National Strategic Intelligence Act) was legislation revamping the intelligence agencies of the Republic of South Africa, passed by the National Assembly on 2 December 1994. The legislation established new intelligence agencies, dismantling those used to enforced the Apartheid regime. New institutions were established under a system designed to respect and protect civil liberties, promote transparency and de-politicize South Africa's security agencies.

== History ==
During the decades of Apartheid regime, South Africa's security and intelligence agencies were used to conduct surveillance, infiltration and intelligence activities against civil rights organizations such as the African National Congress, African politicians, militants and armed groups in Namibia and Rhodesia (now Zimbabwe). The Bureau of State Security (BOSS) and its successor, the National Intelligence Service were condemned for suppressing civil rights activities and organizations by harsh methods and had a notorious reputation for racism. The Intelligence Services Act was passed by the post-Apartheid democratic government to reform South Africa's security organizations.

== Provisions ==
The new laws were developed under the framework of the new Constitution of South Africa, with greater emphasis on civil liberties, rule of law and control of abuse of authority. Intelligence agencies would be subservient to the democratic, civilian government and responsible to parliamentary oversight. The agencies would be required to work within the law, be politically neutral and enforce an ethics code. The National Intelligence Service (NIS) was dismantled, with the responsibilities of non-military foreign intelligence and counterintelligence operations shifting to the newly created South African Secret Service. The National Intelligence Agency was created for domestic intelligence and internal security operations. The Crime Intelligence department of the South African Police Service was created to combat organized crime and trafficking. The Ministry of Intelligence Services was created in 1996 to regulate and oversee South Africa's intelligence agencies, bolstering co-operation between intelligence agencies. Much of the provisions reformed the administration, pay structure, functioning and operational methodology of intelligence and security services that would involve law enforcement, rights of the citizens and special permissions required for actions concerning national security.

== Implementation ==
Two subsequent amendments were passed – the Security Officers Amendment Act (1996) and the Amendment to the National Strategic Intelligence Act (1998). The National Strategic Intelligence Act incorporated regulations to make distinct "internal" military intelligence from "foreign" military intelligence, with new bodies governing the intelligence agencies and operations. However, South African government authorities have faced numerous challenges in undertaking a smooth transition for national security and intelligence, with remnants of the Apartheid-era regime being difficult to police and control and efficient staff and operatives being difficult to train and replace, affecting the quality of intelligence gathering.
