= Mike Louw =

South African intelligence officer (1939–2009)

- Born: Michael James Minaar Louw; 9 November 1939
- Died: 27 December 2009 (aged 70); Middelburg, Eastern Cape
- Occupation: Intelligence Service Head
- Espionage activity
- Allegiance: Republic of South Africa
- Service branch: South African Secret Service
- Service years: 1995-1997
- Rank: Director-General
- Codename: Michael James
- Codename: Mike Hicks

Michael James Minaar Louw (9 November 1939 – 27 December 2009) was Director-General of the South African National Intelligence Service (NIS), and after the 1994 South African elections, was appointed as head of the new South African Secret Service. He played a key role as a representative of the South African government in the secret negotiations held between them and the ANC in exile which brought about the unbanning of the latter in 1990 and the release of Nelson Mandela.

== Early life ==
Louw grew up in Prieska, Northern Cape. He completed his secondary education at Prieska High School. He was educated at the University of the Orange Free State and obtained a Bachelor of Arts in Political Science with honours.

== Background ==
Louw started his working career in the Department of Labour. His earliest intelligence career was with the SADF's Directorate Military Intelligence (DMI) which he joined in 1964. With its formation in 1969, he joined the Bureau of State Security (BOSS) where he worked as a researcher. BOSS was renamed the Department of National Security (DONS) in 1978 and then in 1980 to the National Intelligence Service. At the time of its name change, Louw was working as the Director of International Political Research.

Under Niel Barnard's restructuring of BOSS from 1980 into the NIS, the intelligence research division's importance grew and Louw was instrumental in growing the reputation of the organisation with a daily product called National Intelligence Flashes and Sketches (NIFS). He would be promoted to Chief Director Research in the early eighties.

In 1985 he was promoted to Deputy-Director NIS. He was also involved in talks with Nelson Mandela while he was still in prison.

In May 1988, Louw was one of four people appointed by President PW Botha to talk directly with Nelson Mandela. The others were, Fanie van der Merwe, Director-General of the Ministry of Justice, General Willie Willemse, Commissioner of Prisons, and Niel Barnard. These meetings took place at Pollsmoor Prison.

On 12 September 1989, in Lucerne Switzerland, Louw and Martiz Spaarwater (Chief of Operations NIS) met Thabo Mbeki (ANC National Executive Council member) and Jacob Zuma (Deputy Head of the Department of Intelligence and Security – ANC) at a hotel room in the Palace Hotel. The view of the NIS was that a negotiated settlement was the only route for South Africa and this meeting would forge a way for a political solution to the end of apartheid, with the release of Nelson Mandela and the unbanning of the African National Congress. The outcome of the meeting was that the ANC was prepared to enter into further discussions with the South African government while the NIS would report back to President FW de Klerk. On 16 September, Mike Louw and Maritz Spaarwater met de Klerk in Cape Town who became angry when he was told of the NIS meeting but calmed down when shown the authorisation for the meeting by Louw. Prior to the meeting, in August 1989, a resolution was brought before the State Security Council (SSC). The resolution, drafted by Niel Barnard and Mike Louw, and supported by Kobie Coetsee and President P.W. Botha, prior to the change in presidents, proposed examining the feasibility of entering discussions with the ANC, which was seen by the NIS as the go-ahead to hold discussions. The resolution was adopted by the State Security Council.

In January 1990, Louw instructed Martiz Spaarwater to organise a second meeting with Thabo Mbeki and Aziz Pahad, representing the ANZ in-exile, in Lucerne on 6 February 1990. This occurred four days after FW de Klerk's 2 February 1990 speech at the opening of parliament. Priorities such as the release of Nelson Mandela, return of ANC exiles to the country, release of political prisoners and preparations for constitutional negotiations were finalised. Four committees would be established to consider and make further recommendations on these four priorities. In 1992, he was appointed the Director-General of the National Intelligence Service replacing Niel Barnard.

After the amalgamation of the six old intelligence services into two intelligence services after the 1994 South African election, the South African Secret Service (SASS) and the National Intelligence Agency (NIA), he would lead the foreign intelligence branch, the SASS from 1 January 1995 until 1997 when he left due to illness.

In 2003 he was awarded the platinum version of the Intelligence Lifetime Award by the President through the Minister for Intelligence Services. Appointed in 2003, he was one of three part-time councillors on the Intelligence Services Council on Conditions of Service.

== Personal life and death ==
Louw was married to Marié and had three children; Kobus, Marianna (Marais) and Van Wyk. He died from a stoke on 27 December 2009, while in Middelburg, Eastern Cape as he was returning to Pretoria with his family.
