= State Security Agency (South Africa) =

Department of the South African government

Agency overview
- Formed: 2009
- Jurisdiction: Government of South Africa
- Headquarters: Musanda Complex, Joe Nhlanhla Street, Pretoria, Gauteng; 25°51′02″S 28°18′24″E
- Annual budget: R 4,308.3 million (2015)
- Ministers responsible: Khumbudzo Ntshavheni, Minister in the Presidency; Nomasonto Motaung Kenneth Morolong, Deputy Ministers in the Presidency for State Security
- Agency executive: Tony Msimanga, The Acting Director General of the SSA
- Key documents: Intelligence Services Act, 2002; Presidential Proclamation No R 59 of 2009
- Website: www.ssa.gov.za

The State Security Agency (SSA) is the department of the South African government with overall responsibility for civilian intelligence operations. It was created in October 2009 to incorporate the formerly separate National Intelligence Agency, South African Secret Service, South African National Academy of Intelligence, National Communications Centre, and COMSEC.

This restructuring and integration of the disparate agencies was ongoing as of 2011.

Political responsibility for the agency lies with the Minister in the Presidency; as of 2023 this is Khumbudzo Ntshavheni. The agency is headed by an acting director-general; as of 2022 this is Thembisile Majola. In the 2010/11 national budget, the secret services received a total transfer of 3,052.2 million rand. For the 2015/16 national budget, the secret services received a total transfer of 4,308.3 million rand.

The Spy Cables are a set of leaked communications published by Al Jazeera and The Guardian, derived from communications between the State Security Agency and other global intelligence agencies.

== Origins ==
The SSA’s focus on state security is significant and is best understood in the context of the evolution of South African politics since 1961. During the B. J. Vorster regime, state security was seen to be paramount by virtue of the fact that the state was the referent object simply because it represented an ethnic minority and was thus contested. The referent object is that which needs to be secured. This gave rise to the Bureau of State Security (BOSS), which came to an end after the Info Scandal, which involved the use of secret funds and covert capabilities to manipulate public opinion via the media, was revealed. Emerging from this was the P. W. Botha regime, which saw the rise of the State Security Council (SSC) as the premier decision-making organ. This organisation was hawkish and favoured the military, and was formed as a direct result of the emergence of paramilitary police units.

While this process was unfolding, the National Intelligence Service (NIS) was created but remained in the shadow under the leadership of Dr Niel Barnard. Central to the creation of the NIS was the burning question about what the referent object is and how it should be secured. Within the NIS, the view was that the only way to secure the state was to create a legitimate government representative of the majority of its citizens. This discourse was known as "National Security" and the focus of security was the nation. The idea being that if the nation is secured, then a legitimate government would emerge so state security would become irrelevant as a concept.

When the F. W. de Klerk regime took over, it inherited a security force in crisis arising from the actions of the paramilitary police. This created space for the National Security discourse to take its rightful place in underpinning the transition to democracy by creating the climate for negotiations to end the Armed Struggle. This saw the concept of "national security" dominate the intelligence community, at least during the transition to democracy and the decade thereafter. It was only when the state started to perceive that it was under threat, that the old thinking about "state security" again emerged. This drove the creation of the State Security Agency (with the security of the state as its primary objective) out of the remnants of what had evolved from the NIS (with the security of the nation as its primary objective).

== Functions and mandate ==
The SSA describes its mandate as to:

provide the government with intelligence on domestic and foreign threats or potential threats to national stability, the constitutional order, and the safety and well being of our people.

— State Security Agency

Some of the areas the SSA focuses on are:

- Terrorism
- Sabotage
- Subversion
- Espionage
- Organised crime

== Legislation ==
The following pieces of legislation govern and manage the role of the State Security Agency:

- Constitution of South Africa, 1996
- Proclamation: Government Gazette 32566
- Intelligence Services Act, 2002 (Act 65 of 2002)
- Ministerial Notices No 32576
- Government Gazette No 25592: Intelligence Services Regulations 2003
- National Strategic Intelligence Act, 1994 (Act 39 of 1994)
- Intelligence Services Oversight Act, 1994 (Act 40 of 1994)
- Intelligence Services Act, 2005 (Act 65 of 2005)
- White Paper on Intelligence (1994)
- Protection of State Information Bill, November 2011
- Diplomatic Immunities and Privileges Act, 2001 (Act 37 of 2001)
- Regulation of Foreign Military Assistance Act, 1998 (Act 15 of 1998)
- Defence Act, 2002 (Act 42 of 2002)
- SAPS Act, 1995
- Financial Intelligence Centre Act, 2001 (Act 38 of 2001)
- Regulation of Interception of Communications and Provision of Communication-related Information Act, 2002 (RICA) (Act 70 of 2002
- Auditor-General Act, 1995 (Act 12 of 1995).

== Director-Generals/Directors ==
The following people have held the position of Director-General since the restructure of the South African intelligence services in 2009:

- 2009 – 2011 Mzuvukile Jeff Maqetuka
- 2011 – 2013 Dennis Thokozani Dlomo (acting DG)
- 2013 – 2016 Sonto Kudjoe
- 2016 – 2018 Arthur Fraser
- 2018 – 2021 Loyiso Jafta (acting DG)
- 2021 - 2022 Gab Msimanga (acting DG)
- 2022 - 2023 Thembisile Majola

== Organisational structure ==
The following branches make up the State Security Agency:

=== Domestic branch ===
Previously known as the National Intelligence Agency, its mandate is gather and analyse intelligence concerning potential or existing threats to South Africa's security including economic, social, political and environmental issues. The intelligence is shared with President and National Intelligence Co-ordinating Committee (NICOC) and when required, with government departments and the South African Police. The branch is also responsible for counter-intelligence.

=== Foreign branch ===
Previously known as the South African Secret Service, the foreign branches mandate is to collect and analyse foreign intelligence and potential or existing foreign threats to South Africa's security. The intelligence is shared with National Intelligence Co-ordinating Committee.

=== National Communications branch ===
National Communications Centre (NCC)
The branch is responsible for integrating and co-ordinating all South African government signals and communications interception through the Signals Intelligence Evaluation Centre and the Office of Interception Centre.

COMSEC (South Africa) (Electronic Communications Security (Pty) Ltd)
Formed initially in 2002 as a private company called Civilian Intelligence Community, it became a government department in 2009 with a role to ensure that the government and civil service departments electronic communications are protected and secured.

Office for Interception Centre (OIC)
The office centralises the lead role for interception of communications for South African security and law-enforcement services. The office has been regulated since 2005 by the Regulation of Interception of Communications and Provision of Communications-Related Information Act, 2002 (Act 70 of 2002). Oversight rests with the Joint Standing Committee on Intelligence (JSCI) and the Inspector-General.

=== South African National Academy of Intelligence (SANAI) ===
The National Academy of Intelligence is based in Mafikeng and was established in February 2003 and comprises an academic faculty, an intelligence research institute and development support component.

=== Intelligence Services Council on Conditions of Employment (ISC) ===
The council consists of at least three people one of whom is the chairperson and are appointed by the Minister of Intelligence. The council make recommendations to the minister on conditions of service and other human resources activities such as salaries, fringe benefits and performance measures for staff in the agency.
