= Minister of State Security (South Africa) =

Former Minister of the South African government

South Africa Minister of State Security
- Flag of South Africa
- Department of State Security
- Style: The Honourable
- Appointer: Cyril Ramaphosa
- Inaugural holder: Joe Nhlanhla
- Formation: 18 June 1999
- Final holder: Ayanda Dlodlo
- Abolished: August 2021
- Website: Department of State Security

The minister of state security (formerly the minister of intelligence services) was a minister of the South African government, who oversaw South Africa's civilian intelligence agencies and national security matters. In 2021 the ministry was abolished and the function of the minister was taken over by the Presidency.

== Formation ==
In 1994, the intelligence service affairs were subordinated to the minister of justice. In 1995, Joe Nhlanhla became deputy minister of justice with responsibility for intelligence affairs.

When Jacob Zuma was elected president in 2009 he renamed the post to Minister of State Security, but kept Siyabonga Cwele in the job. After the ANC election win in May 2014, Jacob Zuma announced the new minister of state security as David Mahlobo.

== Agencies ==
The following agencies and their entities fell under the oversight of the minister of state security:

State Security Agency

- National Intelligence Agency - now known as the Domestic branch
- South African Secret Service - now known as the Foreign branch
- National Communications Centre
- COMSEC (Electronic Communications Security (Pty) Ltd)
- South African National Academy of Intelligence

National Intelligence Co-Ordinating Committee

== List of past ministers ==
=== Intelligence services, 1999-2009 ===
Name	Portrait	Term		Party	President
Joe Nhlanhla		18 June 1999	2000	ANC	Thabo Mbeki (I) (II)
Lindiwe Sisulu		2000	28 April 2004	ANC	Thabo Mbeki (I) (II)
Ronnie Kasrils		29 April 2004	2008	SACP	Thabo Mbeki (I) (II)
Siyabonga Cwele		2008	22 April 2009	ANC	Kgalema Motlanthe (takes office after Mbeki resigns)

=== State security, 2009-2021 ===
Name	Portrait	Term		Party	President
Siyabonga Cwele		22 April 2009	24 May 2014	ANC	Jacob Zuma (I) (II)
David Mahlobo		25 May 2014	16 October 2017	ANC	Jacob Zuma (I) (II)
Bongani Bongo		17 October 2017	26 February 2018	ANC	Jacob Zuma (I) (II)
Dipuo Letsatsi-Duba		26 February 2018	29 May 2019	ANC	Cyril Ramaphosa (I)
Ayanda Dlodlo		30 May 2019	August 2021	ANC	Cyril Ramaphosa (II)
