= State Security Council =

Defunct South African government body

The State Security Council (SSC) was formed in South Africa in 1972 to advise the government on the country's national policy and strategy concerning security, its implementation and determining security priorities. Its role changed through the prime ministerships of John Vorster and PW Botha (later State President), being little used during the former's and during the latter's, controlling all aspects of South African public's lives by becoming the Cabinet. During those years he would implement a Total National Strategy, Total Counter-revolutionary Strategy and finally in the mid-eighties, established the National Security Management System (NSMS). After FW de Klerk's rise to the role of State President, the Cabinet would eventually regain control of the management of the country. After the 1994 elections a committee called National Intelligence Co-ordinating Committee was formed to advise the South African president on security and intelligence as well as its implementation.

== Early origins ==
On 5 September 1969, Prime Minister John Vorster formed a commission led by Justice H.J. Potgieter to establish the guidelines and mission for intelligence gathering by the Military Intelligence (later DMI) and the Bureau for State Security (BOSS). The Commission to Inquire into Certain Intelligence Aspects of State Security, known better as the Potgieter Commission would investigate the clashes between the two organisations over who had primary responsibility for intelligence gathering in South Africa. As the BOSS head Hendrik van den Bergh was a close ally of the Prime Minister, it was seen by Military Intelligence as a foregone conclusion that BOSS would achieve favour. The Potgieter Commission reported back on 2 February 1972 and the results were subsequently used to enact the Security Intelligence and State Security Council Act 64 of 1972 on 24 May 1972. Part of this act established the formation of the State Security Council under the control of the cabinet and established it as the government's national centre for operational security. Due to the domination of BOSS, the State Security Council under Vorster would meet infrequently and would be purely advisory.

== B.J Vorster years and the SSC ==
In October 1974, Vorster initiated a foreign policy of "Détente" seeking support for a constellation of Southern African states who would be a united front against a common enemy, communism. The use of white buffers states began to fail in 1974 with a coup in Portugal, known as the Carnation Revolution, and by 1975 African nationalist groups were in control of its colonies of Angola and Mozambique. BOSS was instrumental in organizing the search for influential allies in the region and arranging the meetings. This policy was soon destroyed by the South African invasion of Angola in 1975 and in June 1976 with the Soweto riots.

The years between 1974 and 1978 were dominated by infighting as various areas of the government for control of the countries foreign and security policy. Foreign Affairs and the Department of Information argued over foreign policy in South Africa and abroad while BOSS and the military argued over the direction of security policy for the country. In 1977, a Defence White Paper was published and outlined the Total Strategy Plan that would later be implemented and dominate the PW Botha years. This plan envisioned the mobilization of South Africa's military, economic, political and social resources so as to defend and advance the country's interests at home and abroad and also called for an increase in the military budget so as to balance the playing fields relative to the southern African states.

In the wake of the Info scandal in which the Bureau of State Security (BOSS) had become mired, the head of the BOSS, Hendrik van den Berg, resigned in June 1978. By 2 October 1978, Prime Minister B.J. Vorster had resigned and on 9 October, the Defence Minister PW Botha was appointed as the new Prime Minister of South Africa.

== PW Botha years and the SSC ==
Vorster was appointed as State President on 10 October but would resign in May 1979 when the results of the Erasmus Commission of Inquiry into the Information Scandal were released in that year. On 20 November 1978, the Bureau of State Security was brought under tighter control as a cabinet portfolio called National Security managed by Prime Minister who also held the Minister of Defence portfolio. With the rise of PW Botha to prime minister, so the SADF's power increase in cabinet and with that the Directorate Military Intelligence (DMI), who would strive to dominate security issues in the new government and decide its policy and implementation.

In October 1978, Deputy Defence and Intelligence Minister Kobie Coetsee was appointed by Prime Minister PW Botha to lead a commission of inquiry into intelligence gathering in South Africa and in particular who would be the lead agency. It was believed that it was predetermined that the DMI would be the lead intelligence agency. PW Botha had decided to split the intelligence gathering ability of South Africa amongst four agencies, the DMI, BOSS/DONS, Security Branch and Foreign Affairs, hoping to reduce the political dominance by one over the others, but the rivalry would continue.

On 12 February 1979, the State Security Council issued guidelines for who could authorize five types of external operations by South African forces. A regional strategy for destabilization was also established to prevent the establishment of ANC bases in those countries. In Angola, the South African strategy was to divide the country, supporting secession in the south of the country, managed by the South African Defence Force (SADF) and DMI. In Mozambique, it meant the building up RENAMO, created by the Rhodesians in opposition to the Mozambican government, and under SADF control by 1980, managed by the DMI's Directorate of Special Tasks.

PW Botha described the Westminster system as not appropriate for the country and that in order to implement the Total Strategy, it was necessary to integrate the states resources and overhaul the states political and administrative structures. This rationalization process begun in March 1979 to restructure the states decision-making process. It would centralize the power with the prime minister and sideline the cabinet and parliament. A cabinet secretariat was created in the Office of the Prime Minister, with the reduction of Vorster's twenty cabinet advisory committees to four under PW Botha as decision-making bodies not advisory, not accountable to the cabinet. These would be the committees of National Security, Constitutional, Economic and Social Affairs, each under a minister appointed by the Prime Minister. The National Security committee would manage the SSC and the National Security Management System, with its decisions not having to be ratified by the Cabinet and only informed of them if required by the Prime Minister. The SSC's strategy was managed by thirteen to fifteen Interdepartmental Committees and implemented through fifteen internal and external Joint Management Centre's. On 16 August 1979, the National Security Management System (NSMS) was established which would integrate the efforts of the entire government and its assets towards protecting the state with the SADF, Police and Intelligence services as the core of the system and managed by the Security Council.

In November 1980, PW Botha ordered a Rationalisation Committee be formed to rationalise the intelligence services so as to improve the co-ordination of intelligence in the State Security Council. This committee met between 14 and 19 January 1981 in Simonstown to finalise the functions of each department. This resulted in the Simonstown Accords with the NIS responsible for political and economic intelligence, counter-intelligence and evaluation. DMI would be responsible for military intelligence and contra-mobilisation within South Africa and externally. The Security Branch would be responsible for counter-subversion within South Africa and externally.

By 1985, the South African government realized that its 1983 Tricameral Parliament and its new constitution was a failure as it left out black representation and was responsible for the loss of control of the large townships in the Vaal Triangle and the Eastern Cape to the ANC and its revolutionary struggle. On 21 July 1985, PW Bothas declared a State of Emergency to counter the violence in magisterial districts representing one-third of the country. PW Botha delivered his Rubicon speech to the world on 15 August 1985 that failed to announce the release of Nelson Mandela and the end of Apartheid, rather continuing the current policy. The negative speech had serious financial implications with a drop in the value of the Rand and the reduction of international loans, caused the SSC to realize that the Total Onslaught was not just by communist forces but also had a component of Western hostility.

In April 1986, the SSC developed guidelines to adopt a counter-revolutionary war by using anti-revolutionary groups within South Africa to counter the arming of black communities by ANC by arming and training anti-ANC groups. On 9 May 1986, the SSC received a document concerning a new force to counter revolutionary forces and consensus was reached in the council to create the force. This resulted in the formation of the Civil Cooperation Bureau (CCB) with the front company was launched by the South African Special Forces that May. In June 1986, Operation Marion was approved by the SSC with the DMI responsible for training Zulu Inkatha paramilitary forces to counter ANC forces in the townships and this strategy would be attempted in the Ciskei and the Transkei. On 12 June 1986, the governments State of Emergency, cancelled on 7 March 1986, was re-extended to the whole country. Its purpose was to restore law and order, normalise life in the townships so as to create a circumstance for constitutional, economic and social development.

== Council membership ==
The Act called for the following persons to be members of the State Security Council:

- Prime Minister
- Minister of Defence
- Minister of Foreign Affairs
- Minister of Justice
- Minister of Police
- Chief of the Defence Force
- Chief of the South African Police
- Director-General of Bureau for State Security (BOSS) (later National Intelligence Service (NIS))
- Secretary of Foreign Affairs
- Secretary of Justice

and anyone one else required to aid the discussions.

== Organisational structure ==
The State Security Council (SSC) presided over the National Security Management System (NSMS) of President P.W. Botha's National Party Government in South Africa. Its function was to advise the government on formulating and executing national security policy. Botha himself chaired the SSC, which was served by a secretariat of 100 full-time staff seconded from other government departments. The SSC had four divisions:

- Strategy Planning Branch (Strategy Branch)
- Strategic Communications (Stratkom)
- National Intelligence Interpretation Branch, (NIIB) and
- Administration Branch

=== Secretariat ===
Established in 1979, these are the three secretaries of the State Security Council:

- Lt Gen A.J. van Deventer (1979 – 1985)
- Lt Gen Pieter van der Westhuizen (1985 – 1988)
- Lt Gen Charles Lloyd (1988 – 1990)

Deputy secretary for most of the 1980s was Major-General J.F van Rensburg.

=== Strategy Branch ===
The Strategy Planning Branch developed the national government's strategy. This was undertaken through a Total Planning Cell made up of thirteen interdepartmental committees that developed Total Strategies; security, economic, social and constitutional to counter the Total Onslaught.

=== Stratkom ===
The Strategic Communication branch developed strategies and policies for combating the “Total Onslaught” by organisations opposed to South African government and were developed in conjunction with the Strategy and the National Intelligence Interpretation Branches. One of its aims was to discredit anti-apartheid organisations, neutralise anti-apartheid propaganda against the South African government and promote a positive image of the anti-communist organisations operating in Southern Africa. This was done by way of two means, one using the Bureau of Information to overtly sell the message of the South African government departments and secondly, covertly sell the South African governments message to the country or world through organisations not officially aligned to it. A second aim would be to develop strategies such as assassination, attacks, economic sabotage, character assassination and front companies against anti-apartheid organisations. By 1984, it was said that this branch consisted of around 2650 people of which 1930 were members of the SADF.

=== National Intelligence Interpretation Branch (NIIB) ===
The purpose of this branch was to coordinate the gathering of intelligence by the different South African intelligence and security organisations such as National Intelligence Service (NIS), Directorate Military Intelligence (DMI), Security Branch and Foreign Affairs intelligence committee. Its second purpose was to interpret all national security and intelligence gathered by the above bodies and provide a national intelligence brief to the South African government. The NIIB would come into existence on 1 January 1982 and the NIS would provide most of the analysts for this branch.

=== Administration Branch ===
As its name implies, this branch supplied the administrative staff required to assist the secretariat.

=== Other SSC committees ===
KIK – Koordineer Inligting Komitee – Co-ordinating Intelligence Committee

Formed on 30 January 1981, also known as the “K” Committee and chaired by Neil Barnard, its role was to co-ordinate activities and intelligence between all intelligence agencies and the non-security agencies. It had a number of sub-committees: Covert Collection (later called TREWITS), Open Information Gathering, Technical, Evaluation (later became NIIB), Counter Espionage and Security Intelligence.

TREWITS – Teen Rewolusionere Inligting Taakspan – Counter-revolutionary Intelligence Task Team

Formed during 1985, its role was to identify targets for action and or elimination as well as gather intelligence for such operations, with the specific aim of improving the co-ordination of the various security forces. It was under the command of the Security Branch and a sub-committee of KIK; it had members from the NIS, Security Branch, DMI and Special Forces. TREWITS would interact with the Joint Management Centres through the VEIKOM committees. This committee closed in early 1992 and its documents were destroyed.

=== Joint Management Centres ===
The core of the implementation of the NSMS was the Joint Management Centre. This was a network of regional, district and local committees or Joint Management Centres (JMCs) which reported on the activities and location of political activists so as to form an overall security profile, thus enabling decisions on security action to be taken. Such action included assassination of people opposed to the apartheid government's policies, and the widespread use of abduction, arson, sabotage and torture. The SSC put pressure on the security forces to "engage robustly" against persons and organisations opposed to the government.

The Joint Management Centres had two main roles. One, to obtain intelligence in the areas of the country they operated especially the activities of the African National Congress (ANC), Pan-African Congress (PAC) and later in the mid-eighties, the United Democratic Front (UDF) but essentially any organisation the SSC thought acted against the interests of the state. Its secondary role, that was neglected due to the overriding interests of the security and intelligence brief, was the implementation of the executive strategy and policy to improve the socio-economic and political affairs in the regions controlled by the JMC which were the three of the four pillars of the governments Total Strategy. These roles could be defined as through military control, bring stability to the townships, restoring the role of the state in those communities which would legitimise the states role and finally in the long term anticipating and controlling future resistance through the implementation of political, social and economic reform.

==== Structure ====
There were twelve JMC's based in each province and capital city which replicated the SADF command regions and under the command of a SADF Brigadier, except the Western Cape and Witwatersrand, which were under the command of a South African Police (SAP) Divisional Commander. There were also five external JMC's, Walvis Bay, Namibia Command, Southern Command (five Black Homelands), Northern Command (Frontline States) and Angola. The internal JMC'c were broken down into further three levels. There were sixty Sub-JMC's under the control of a SAP district commander and roughly covered the country's police districts. Mini-JMC's with 450 in total which covered the South African magisterial districts and represented by a local SAP commander. Last level of control of South African society was through Local Management Centres (LMC) which would be based in city and towns. Information would move back and forth from the lowest levels to the JMC, then SSC, its working committee and finally the cabinets and prime minister or state president.

The following seven components made up each Joint Management Centres and were replicated to a large extent in the lower levels of the Sub and Mini JMC's and was itself similar to the State Security Council's structure:

- Executive Committee – this was made up by the head of the individual JMC and the committee heads listed below
- Secretariat – administration of the JMC
- Security Committee (SECCOM/VEIKOM) – main aim was to plan, monitor and co-ordinate the security forces. The operational role was under the command of a SAP commander through a Joint Operations Centre. Members of this committee included the SAP, SADF, NIS, Security Police, Railway Police, Civil defence, Commandos and state and provincial officials
- Joint Intelligence Committee (JICOM/GIKOM) – main aim was to provide daily intelligence to the other committees. The operational role was under the command of an Army Intelligence commander through a Joint Intelligence Centre. Members of this committee included the Directorate Military Intelligence (DMI), NIS, Security Police, Prisons Service, Kitskonstabels, private security firms and provincial, regional and local affairs
- Communication Committee (COMCOM/KOMKOM) – main aim was to compile and disseminate propaganda in their area of JMC. Members of this committee consisted of the SAP, SADF and Bureau of Information
- Constitutional, Economic and Welfare Committee – main aim was to implement the National Welfare Management strategy of the government. Members included civil servants from housing, finance, constitutional affairs and pensions
- Liaison Committee – communication with the public sector

== FW De Klerk years and the SSC ==
PW Botha suffered a stroke in January 1989 and by 14 August 1989 he had resigned due to ill health. FW de Klerk was first appointed to the role of acting South African President and then on 20 September as State President. During November 1989, de Klerk began to abolish the National Security Management System which would begin to reign in the power the military and security establishment had over the government's civilian decision-making processes. With the SSC reduced to an advisory body, the JMC's were reduced to civilian run regional and co-ordinating centres no longer under SAP and DMI control. De Klerk formed a Cabinet Committee for Security, with the State President and his ministers as members with decision making and co-ordination for national security now under civilian control.

The dismantling of military and security power continued under de Klerk with the permission for marches and rallies, the reduction of national military service to one year and the return of foreign diplomacy as opposed to regional destabilisation in southern Africa. Judicial commissions of inquiries and investigations begun into the SAP and DMI as well as the use of third forces and death squads which resulted in the suspension of the CCB in February 1990 and its dismantling in July of the same year. The military and police intelligence services were reduced to purely internal matters while the power of the NIS rose becoming responsible for external intelligence and as an advisor to the State President.

In a statement on the death of former president P.W. Botha in 2006, his successor, F.W. de Klerk, said:

Personally, my relationship with P.W. Botha was often strained. I did not like his overbearing leadership style and was opposed to the intrusion of the State Security Council system into virtually every facet of government. After I became leader of the National Party in February 1989 I did my best to ensure that P.W. Botha would be able to end his term as president with full dignity and decorum. Unfortunately, this was not to be.

In August 2007, de Klerk was challenged to say what he knew about the atrocities carried out at the behest of the SSC. The Guardian quoted de Klerk as replying that although he was a member of the cabinet it was not briefed "on clandestine operations involving murders, assassinations or the like – all of which were evidently carried out strictly on a 'need to know' basis". The same newspaper report alleged that, in his last months as president in 1994, de Klerk ordered the wholesale shredding and incineration of tons of documents, microfilm and computer tapes that dealt with matters such as the chain of command in covert operations.

== New security structure and post 1994 investigations ==
A Transitional Executive Council (TEC) was formed by an act of parliament in September 1993 and was made up of members of the political parties who had negotiated the transition to free and fair elections that would take place in April 1994. The TEC would essentially run the country until the election and was made up of seven sub-committees, composed of members of the negotiating political parties, with one of those committees responsible for intelligence. This committee was called the Sub-Council on Intelligence and was established in November 1993. The committees role was to find a solution to the structure of South Africa's future intelligence service which would be acceptable to all six intelligence services of the various political parties in country. These six intelligence organisations consisted of the NIS, Department of Intelligence and Security (ANC), Pan African Security Service (PAC), and the three intelligence services of Venda, Transkei and Bophuthatswana.

The second role of the Sub-Council on Intelligence of the TEC, was the daily operation of the country's intelligence and security services. This would be done by means of a Joint Coordinating Intelligence Committee (JCIC) but as the NIS opposed ANC control over the services, the JCIC role changed to one of coordination and investigation of the intelligence services as well as the supply of intelligence to the TEC and the other sub-councils. The JCIC would eventually evolve into the Heads of Combined Services (HOCS) and in 1995 become the National Intelligence Co-ordinating Committee (NICOC).

=== TRC Investigation into the SSC ===
In a 1998 report on the former South African government and its security forces, the Truth and Reconciliation Commission (TRC) castigated South Africa's last hard-line apartheid president P.W. Botha and held him responsible for gross human rights violations, including all violence sanctioned by the State Security Council. The report said:

By virtue of his position as head of state and chairperson of the State Security Council (SSC), Botha contributed to and facilitated a climate in which ... gross violations of human rights did occur, and as such is accountable for such violations.

The TRC also found that the SSC had contributed to the prevailing culture of impunity by failing to recommend that action be taken against those members of the security forces who were involved in gross human rights violations.

=== SSC and Samora Machel ===
In 1996, the TRC conducted a special investigation into the 1986 aircrash in which president Samora Machel of Mozambique was killed. The investigation was unable to prove an allegation that South Africa was behind the Mozambican Tupolev Tu-134 air disaster, but the TRC stated in its report:

South Africa's State Security Council (SSC) minutes from January 1984 indicate that the Mozambican working group, including General Jac Buchner and Major Craig Williamson, discussed how to help RENAMO overthrow the FRELIMO government of Mozambique.

== See also ==
- South African Bureau of State Security (1969 to 1980)
- National Intelligence Service (South Africa) (1980 to 1994)
- Civil Cooperation Bureau
- State-sponsored terrorism
