= Tshikare =

Tshikare is a surname. Notable people with the surname include:

- Atang Tshikare (born 1980), South African artist and designer
- Peter Lesego Tshikare (1933–2008), South African activist
