= Thembi Majola =

South African politician

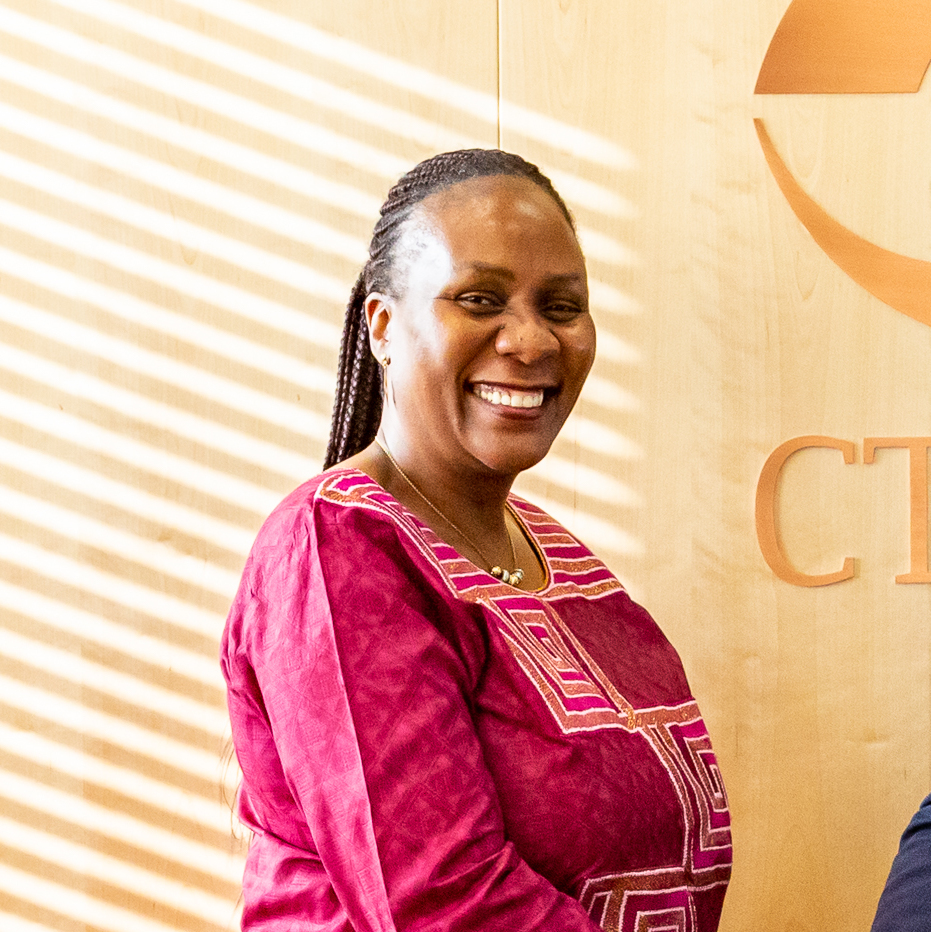
- Majola in November 2018

Deputy Minister of Energy
- In office 25 May 2014 – 31 December 2018
- President: Jacob Zuma; Cyril Ramaphosa
- Minister: Tina Joemat-Pettersson; Mmamoloko Kubayi; David Mahlobo; Jeff Radebe
- Preceded by: Barbara Thomson

Member of the National Assembly
- In office 14 August 2018 – 31 December 2018

Personal details
- Born: Thembisile Cheryl Majola Soweto, Transvaal, South Africa
- Party: African National Congress
- Spouse: Umaro Sissoco Embaló (div. 2014)
- Education: University of Camagüey

Thembisile Cheryl Majola is a South African politician and civil servant who was Deputy Minister of Energy between May 2014 and December 2018. She was also director-general of the State Security Agency between March 2022 and November 2023.

A civil engineer by training, Majola rose to prominence during the presidency of Thabo Mbeki, when she worked in Mbeki's presidential office and served as South African Ambassador to Senegal, Mauritania, Cape Verde, Gambia and Guinea Bissau. She joined the African National Congress in exile during apartheid.

== Early life and career ==
Majola was born in Soweto but spent part of her childhood in exile, attending school in Botswana, Zambia, and Cuba. She studied civil engineering at university in Zambia and Cuba, completing a bachelor of science and master of science in civil engineering at the University of Camagüey. Thereafter she filled roles in the exile missions of the South African African National Congress (ANC). Between 1986 and 1987, she was an engineer at the ANC's Solomon Mahlangu Freedom College in Tanzania, and from 1987 to 1989 she was stationed in Angola: while serving as the secretary of the ANC Women's Section in Angola, she spent a year at the Caculama military training camp and then worked on an irrigation project in Luanda.

In 1990, during the negotiations to end apartheid, Majola returned to South Africa; she was treasurer of the Johannesburg-based ANC Women's Task Force, responsible for preparing for the relaunch of the ANC Women's League, and worked as a project engineer for the Rural Advice Centre in the Northern Transvaal (now Limpopo). Between 1993 and 1997, she lived in Geneva, where she was executive secretary of the women and development programme of the World Council of Churches.

== Early career in government ==
Returning to South Africa in 1997, she spent a brief stint as a consultant at the Development Bank of Southern Africa, working on the Coega Special Development initiative, before entering the post-apartheid government. From 1997 to 2001 she was chief director of international relations and trade in the Office of the Deputy President under deputy presidents Thabo Mbeki and Jacob Zuma. In 2001 she followed Mbeki to the Presidency of South Africa, where she was deputy director-general in the presidential support unit until 2005.

In 2006, Mbeki appointed Majola as South African Ambassador to Senegal, Mauritania, Cape Verde, Gambia and Guinea Bissau. She returned in 2009 and became deputy coordinator of core business in the National Intelligence Co-ordinating Committee. In 2010, she worked as a consultant in the Office of the Gauteng Premier, then led by premier Nomvula Mokonyane. Thereafter she took a hiatus in the private sector: she was market development manager for the Africa region at Aurecon between 2010 and 2013 and then joined Thenoma Consulting, an Ekurhuleni-based company, as a director in 2013.

== Deputy Minister of Energy: 2014–2018 ==
In the May 2014 general election, Majola stood for election to an ANC seat in the National Assembly of South Africa, but she did not win a seat. Nonetheless, on 25 May 2014, President Jacob Zuma announced Majola's appointment as Deputy Minister of Energy in his second-term cabinet. Through the remainder of Zuma's presidency, Majola served under three consecutive energy ministers: Tina Joemat-Pettersson, Mmamoloko Kubayi, and David Mahlobo. The activities of the energy department in this period were controversial, particularly because of Zuma's support for a proposed nuclear deal with Russia and the 2015 sale of a large portion of the Central Energy Fund's strategic oil reserves.

When Zuma's successor, President Cyril Ramaphosa, took office in February 2018, Majola remained in the energy portfolio, now under Minister Jeff Radebe. On 14 August 2018, she was additionally sworn in as a member of the National Assembly, filling the casual vacancy created by Lynne Brown's resignation; before then, Majola had served in government under a constitutional provision allowing appointments from outside Parliament.

In November 2018, Ramaphosa announced that Majola would resign on 31 December for personal reasons.

== State Security Agency: 2022–2023 ==
On 28 February 2022, President Ramaphosa's office announced that Majola had been appointed as director-general of the State Security Agency (SSA) with effect from 1 March. Her appointment followed a prolonged period of instability at the agency: it had not had a permanent director-general since Arthur Fraser's departure in 2018, and two high-level reviews had concluded that the agency's functions had been politicised and abused during the Zuma administration.

Although Majola was appointed for a three-year term, she served less than two years: she announced her resignation in November 2023 with effect from 30 November. Although the presidency said that her resignation was by "mutual consent", it was rumored to be related to tensions between Majola and Ramaphosa's Minister in the Presidency, Khumbudzo Ntshavheni, and to Majola's opposition to Robert McBride's reinstatement as head of the SSA's foreign branch. Ntshaveni denied the rumors.

== Personal life ==
During her tenure as ambassador in West Africa, Majola met and married Umaro Sissoco Embaló, a Bissau-Guinean politician who later became the president of Guinea-Bissau. They divorced in 2014.
