= Peter Boroko =

South African MK veteran and SANDF major-general (1933–2008)

- Born: Peter Lesego Tshikare; 23 November 1933; Johannesburg, South Africa
- Died: 2 December 2008 (aged 75) Walkerville, Gauteng, South Africa
- Buried: Jakobskop Cemetery, Walkerville, Gauteng
- Allegiance: African National Congress / South African National Defence Force
- Branch: Umkhonto we Sizwe (MK); South African National Defence Force (SANDF)
- Service years: 1963–1998
- Rank: Major-General
- Commands: Deputy Chief of Intelligence (MK)
- Conflicts: Anti-apartheid struggle
- Awards: Order of Mendi for Bravery (Silver) (posthumous)
- Other work: ANC diplomatic representative in Egypt; Director of Dewina Africa; Director at Armscor

Peter Lesego Tshikare (23 November 1933 – 2 December 2008) was a South African anti-apartheid activist, veteran commander of Umkhonto we Sizwe (MK) and a South African National Defence Force (SANDF) major-general. Known during his years in exile as Peter Boroko, he played a key role in the ANC’s military intelligence structures such as being one of leaders of Mbokodo and later served in senior diplomatic and defence positions for the post-apartheid South African government. He was born in Johannesburg.

In 1963, he joined Umkhonto we Sizwe, the armed wing of the African National Congress (ANC). He left South Africa the same year to undergo military training in the Soviet Union, completing courses in Odessa in 1966 and later advanced security and intelligence studies in Moscow in 1970.

In late 1976, Tshikare was sent to Angola to discuss with the Angolan government possibilities of establishing MK camps there, which was approved. He returned to Lusaka in 1977 as chief of intelligence for the African National Congress (ANC) in South Africa, Botswana, Swaziland and Lesotho.

In the 1980s, Boroko deputized for Mzwai Piliso, then head of the ANC's Department of National Intelligence and Security.

After 32 years in exile, Tshikare returned to South Africa in 1993. Following the democratic transition, he was integrated into the South African National Defence Force and appointed a major-general in military intelligence in 1994, a position he held until his retirement in 1998.

He later entered the defence industry, serving as director of Dewina Africa in 1998 and as a director at Armscor the following year.

== Death ==
Tshikare died at his home in Walkerville, Gauteng, on 2 December 2008 after a long illness. He was buried at Jakobskop Cemetery in Walkerville.
