= Billy Masetlha =

South African intelligence officer (1954–2023)

Billy Lesedi Masetlha

National Intelligence Agency - Director-General
- In office 2004–2005
- Preceded by: Vusi Mavimbela
- Succeeded by: Manala Manzini

South African Secret Service - Director-General
- In office 1996–1999
- Preceded by: Mike Louw
- Succeeded by: Hilton Dennis

Personal details
- Born: 21 November 1954 Alexandra, Johannesburg, Transvaal, South Africa
- Died: 14 May 2023 (aged 68)
- Citizenship: South African citizenship
- Party: African National Congress
- Profession: Spy, diplomat, South African Ambassador to Algeria

Billy Masetlha (21 November 1954 – 14 May 2023) was a South African intelligence officer. He was the head of the South African National Intelligence Agency before being fired by South African President Thabo Mbeki in 2006.

Masetlha died on 14 May 2023, at the age of 68.
