= Department of National Intelligence and Security (South Africa) =

Department of National Intelligence and Security (NAT) is a defunct security service of the African National Congress (ANC) in exile. At the ANC's Morogoro Conference in Tanzania during 1969, in one of the many decisions made to the organisations structure, it was decided to form a department that would protect the organisations human and material resources. This department was then formed in April 1969.

== Background ==
There were four main functions of the new department. The first was to prevent infiltration of the ANC and its military wing by members of South African security services. Secondly, gather information about the South African governments intentions and strategies. Thirdly, minimize the damage that may have occurred from the infiltration by agents of the South African security services. And finally assist in the reconnaissance of targets inside South Africa which could be developed into potential operations.

Between 1969 and 1981, the department was of an ad hoc nature with staff drawn mainly from Umkhonto we Sizwe (MK), the military wing of the ANC. During those years the departments role was one of security and counter-intelligence. In 1981 a new head of the Department of National Intelligence and Security was sought, based in Lusaka, Zambia with the job offered to Mzwai Piliso, the man responsible for setting up the ANC camps in Angola after 1975 and which housed the recruits who fled South Africa after 1976 Soweto riots. His deputy and Intelligence head would be Peter Boroko (a.k.a. Peter Lesego Tshikare), the head of Security was Reddy Mazimba (a.k.a. Reddy Mampane) and the head of Administration was Sizakele Sigxashe. From 1981, the staffing was formalised with training in intelligence taking place in the Soviet Union, East Germany, Libya and Zimbabwe.

With the fall of the Portuguese colony in Angola during 1975, the ANC was allowed to set up training camps. By 1979, NAT had set up Rehabilitation Camp 32 also known as the Morris Seabelo Rehabilitation Centre or more infamously as Quatro. It was used as detention and torture camp for those thought to have betrayed the ANC organisation to the South African government or those involved in common crime. The security section of NAT was called the Mbokodo, gaining an infamous reputation by stamping out any sign of dissent in the ANC camps and a need to find scapegoats whether real or imagined when things went wrong.

== Known heads ==
- Moses Mabhida 1969 – 1976
- Simon Makana 1976 – 1980
- Mzwai Piliso 1981 – 1985
- Joe Nhlanhla 1985 – 1987

== Organisational structure ==
In the years following its formation, NAT had three main sections:

- Intelligence
- Security
- Processing of Information

As the department was professionalised, the structure changed and the following sections created or expanded:

- Intelligence
- Counter-Intelligence
- Security and Correctional Services
- VIP Protection
- Central Intelligence Evaluation

== Restructure ==
Due to human rights abuses in the ANC camps by the security section of NAT and a mutiny in 1984, it was decided at the May 1985 Kabwe Conference, to suspend NAT with its functions run by temporary committee. The task of restructuring the department would fall to Joe Nhandhla, Jacob Zuma, Alfred Nzo and Sizakele Sigxashe. By 1987 the Department of National Intelligence and Security was restructured and would assist the ANC to negotiate with the South African government's National Intelligence Service. The new department was called the Department of Intelligence and Security. Joe Nhandhla would become the head of the new organization.
