= Spy Cables =

The Spy Cables are a series of leaked documents from global intelligence agencies that were published by Al Jazeera and The Guardian in 2015. The documents date from 2006 to December 2014 and are largely derived from communications between South Africa's State Security Agency and various agencies. Agencies included in the leaks include Israel's Mossad, Russia's FSB, and agencies from France, Jordan, Oman, the United Arab Emirates, the United Kingdom's Secret Intelligence Service, the United States, and countries in Africa.

In one of its reports based on the document cache, Al Jazeera exposed that there are more than 140 foreign spies operating in South Africa and that these have gained access to government departments including the president's office, nuclear facilities, and military secrets. The report said that citizens, civil servants and diplomats are helping the spies "by unwittingly providing them with classified information or by allowing them access to restricted areas."

== Specific revelations ==
- The Israeli intelligence agency Mossad contradicted the Prime minister of Israel, Benjamin Netanyahu's assertion that Iran was a year away from making a nuclear weapon. A report written by Mossad said that Iran was "not performing the activity necessary to produce weapons".
- The United States's Central Intelligence Agency tried to contact Hamas even though they were banned from doing so.
- The leader of the environmental group Greenpeace was targeted by South Korean intelligence agencies.
- The President of the United States, Barack Obama "threatened" the Palestinian president to withdraw Palestine's attempt for recognition at the United Nations.
- In 2007, the People's Republic of China dispatched two armed teams to break into the Pelindaba nuclear research center to steal technology for a pebble bed modular reactor, according to the State Security Agency. A guard at the reactor was shot during the break-in.
- South African intelligence spied on Russia over a controversial $100m joint satellite deal.
- South African and Ethiopian agencies accused Sudan of 2012 plot to kill African Union Commission's chairperson Nkosazana Dlamini-Zuma in Addis Ababa. The documents also showed that Dlamini-Zuma's election in 2012 as head of the commission involved tense diplomatic politicking and included lobbying not just by South Africa but also by the United States and France.
- South Africa accused Israel of using El Al Airlines as cover for its intelligence agencies.
- On June 28, 2012, a group claiming to be former Mossad agents threatened South Africa with cyber attack against country's banking and financial sectors, if the government didn't intervene with Boycott, Divestment and Sanctions campaign.
- On July 30, 2012, Mossad requested detailed information on Mohamed Morsi, who had just been elected the President of Egypt.

== See also ==
- United States diplomatic cables leak
