= Operation Vula =

Secret programme of the African National Congress

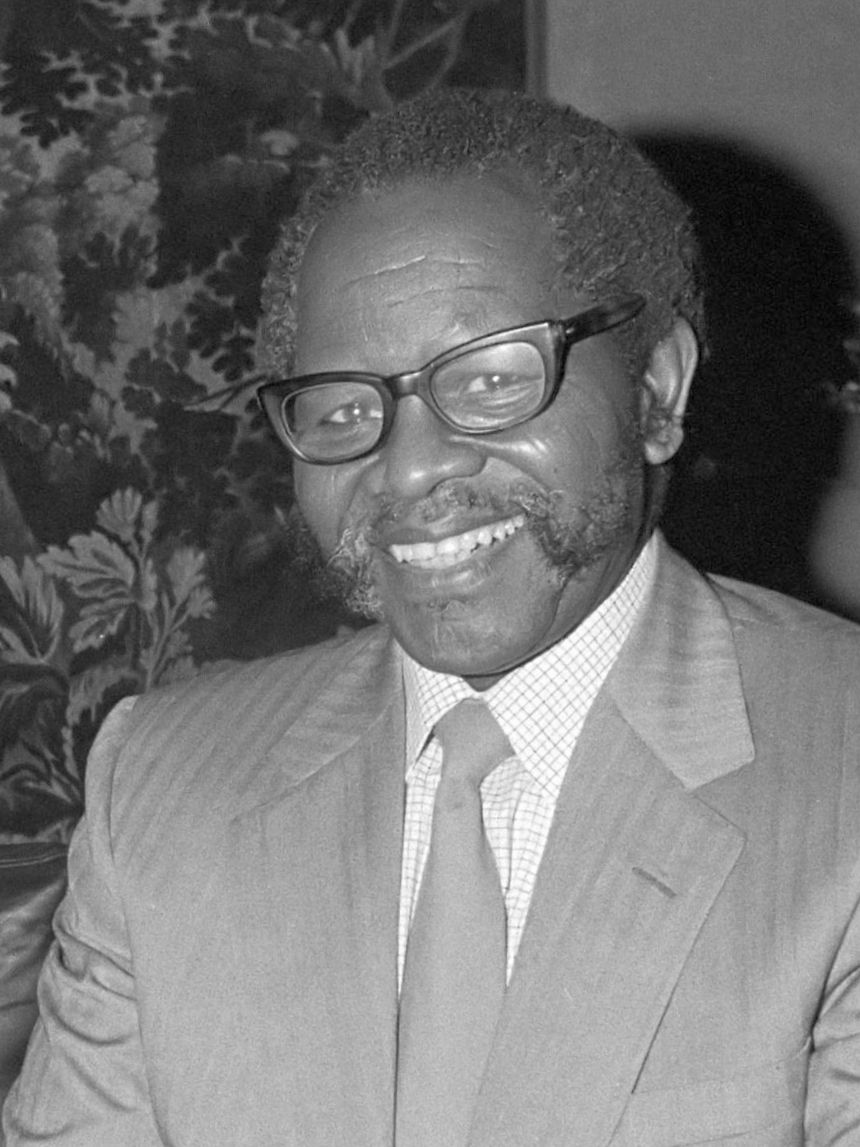
Known as the "President's Project," Vula was directly overseen by ANC President Oliver Tambo

Operation Vula (also known as Operation Vulindlela, Xhosa for Open the Road) was a secret domestic programme of the African National Congress (ANC) during the final years of apartheid in South Africa. Initiated in 1986 at the ANC headquarters in Lusaka and launched in South Africa in 1988, its operatives infiltrated weapons and banned ANC leaders into the country, in order to establish an underground network linking domestic activist structures with the ANC in exile. It was responsible for facilitating the only direct line of communication between ANC headquarters and Nelson Mandela, who at the time was imprisoned and was discussing a negotiated settlement with the government on the ANC's behalf. The operation was disbanded in 1990, after its existence had been publicly revealed and eight of its leaders charged under the Internal Security Act with terrorism and plotting an armed insurrection.

Operation Vula was approved by the ANC National Executive Committee but thereafter proceeded on a strictly need-to-know basis, with many ANC members unaware of its existence and many ANC leaders unaware of the details of its activities. It was commanded by Mac Maharaj and Siphiwe Nyanda, whom ANC President Oliver Tambo congratulated in 1988 on not only "the immense potential of the Vula concept but also its tremendous yield in terms of what has been achieved within a short period of time." Commentators have admired the sophistication of the operation, and historian Stephen Ellis calls it "the most effective and impressive project ever mounted by the ANC." However, Ellis also notes that Vula arrived "too late to have a major effect on the strategic balance" in the negotiations to end apartheid.

== Establishment ==
In 1986, the ANC National Executive Committee (NEC), based in Lusaka, Zambia, approved the initiation of Operation Vula, apparently having been lobbied to do so by Mac Maharaj. Maharaj was to be Vula's commander inside South Africa, with Siphiwe Nyanda as his deputy. In Lusaka, the operation was overseen by ANC President Oliver Tambo and by Joe Slovo, the general secretary of the South African Communist Party (SACP). Ellis has suggested that the SACP's influence over the operation was such that Vula might properly be considered an SACP operation, although the extent of the SACP's formal ownership of the operation is unclear.

The NEC agreed from the outset that Vula was to proceed on a "strictly need-to-know basis," administered through Tambo's office as the "President's Project," meaning that even the NEC would not receive reports on its activities. Particularly due to concerns about high-level informants or infiltrators within the ANC, the operation was highly secret until it was uncovered in 1990 – for example, when Maharaj left Lusaka to establish Vula in South Africa, members of the ANC in exile were told that he was going to Europe for medical treatment. The operation was also financed secretly, through front companies and dummy bank accounts. Some logistical aspects of the operation were handled by allies from European anti-apartheid groups, especially in the Netherlands.

== Rationale ==
From the mid-1980s, amid escalating "ungovernability" within South Africa, there was disagreement within the ANC as to how the end of apartheid should and would be secured. Though still banned in South Africa, the ANC in exile, through efforts spearheaded by Thabo Mbeki, had been meeting with prominent businessmen and government officials since at least 1987 to discuss a possible negotiated settlement; by then, Nelson Mandela, though still imprisoned, was also in contact with the government. Others, however, believed that negotiations would not necessarily preclude the need for an armed struggle and even the seizure of power by force. Maharaj was one adherent of this view. In the past, Operation Vula has been perceived – and was portrayed by the apartheid government – as straightforwardly seeking to establish internal networks for a violent insurrection, in line with this latter view. However, subsequent historical research has suggested that Vula, and the maintenance of an armed underground, was intended as a useful corollary to the process of negotiations. Among the potential benefits of maintaining an armed underground were that it could improve the balance of power in the ANC's favour during the negotiations; that it could help protect ANC supporters during local conflicts with Inkatha and others; and that it could provide the ANC with an "insurance policy" in the event that the apartheid government was indeed negotiating in bad faith.

Thus one of Vula's main objectives was to establish internal underground structures which could be mobilised in armed struggle if necessary – in one phrase, "potentially armed" structures. In December 1988, Tambo wrote to Maharaj:

We need a sustained, ever growing and expanding military offensive. But we are unable to take off in any significant manner. We hit one disaster after another, continuously, year in and year out, precisely because we sought to run before we could walk, and kept on walking. Vula must not follow the beaten path – it's a minefield. Vula must strike out on a new road – to lay the indispensable foundations for a viable armed struggle by first creating, building and consolidating a strong, resilient, extensive political network that is self-protective, absorb shocks. This is precisely the task Vula has started tackling with startling vigour and effectiveness.

A substantial and tested leadership was developing within the country. The time had arrived where the conditions had been created for the leadership of our movement, who had been driven into exile, to begin relocating itself within the country despite the formidable power of the apartheid state. The time had arrived that while relocating itself that leadership had to merge with the forces and leadership that had been developing within the country… Vula and other similar projects did not in any way constitute the pursuance of a double agenda, nor did they constitute actions inconsistent with our search for a negotiated resolution. [If] anything, they strengthened negotiations rather than undermined them.

— Nelson Mandela on Operation Vula in June 1991

However, such structures also had more immediate political uses. Over the preceding decade, the United Democratic Front (UDF), the Congress of South African Trade Unions (COSATU), and other anti-apartheid trade unions and community organisations had emerged as politically influential at the grassroots level, in the absence of an effective ANC leadership inside South Africa. By infiltrating senior leaders into the country and establishing effective intelligence networks, the ANC could assert strategic control over the internal anti-apartheid struggle, arguably for the first time since its banning in 1960. Academic Kenneth Good has gone so far as to argue that "through Operation Vula, the ANC intended to terminate the UDF and the broad and deep democratisation it encouraged," commandeering control of the internal struggle.

== Activities ==
Operation Vula was primarily based in Natal and the Witswatersrand. The first Vula operatives, including Maharaj and Nyanda, entered South Africa secretly in 1987. Various other exiled mid- and top-level ANC personnel were also infiltrated into the country, whereupon they set about establishing military capacity and establishing links with underground ANC members – including ANC leaders recently released from prison, such as Govan Mbeki – as well as with members of other anti-apartheid groupings, especially the influential UDF and COSATU. Notably, Vula operatives coordinated the ANC response to, and containment of, the scandal that arose around Winnie Madikizela-Mandela's involvement in the 1989 death of teenaged activist Stompie Seipei. The military capacity of Operation Vula was never tested, but it did reportedly manage to smuggle into the country large amounts of weapons, which the ANC underground stored in various safe houses. The Truth and Reconciliation Commission later found that many of the weapons were used in local conflicts involving ANC members during the early 1990s.

=== Communications ===
A central objective of Vula was the establishment of a single, reliable channel of communication between internal activists and the ANC headquarters in Lusaka. This was achieved through a purpose-built encrypted communication system, which was developed by Tim Jenkin in London and ran off personal computers. The system was used for such purposes as reporting intelligence, reporting operational instructions and outcomes, debating strategies, and coordinating meetings. In mid-1989, Maharaj obtained Tambo's approval to set up secretly a direct line of communication between Tambo and Mandela, who was then in Victor Verster prison and engaging in preliminary negotiations with the apartheid government. Their messages to each other were smuggled in and out of the prison by Mandela's lawyer, Ismail Ayob, and were transmitted to Tambo through Vula's communication system.

=== Operation Bible ===
Operation Bible was an ANC intelligence project involving the running of an Afrikaner agent, nicknamed the "Nightingale," recruited in 1986 from within the Security Branch of the South African Police. It was led by Moe Shaik and in 1987 was endorsed by the leadership of the ANC in exile, including Tambo and Jacob Zuma, who oversaw the project as head of ANC intelligence. By 1989, the project had effectively been merged into Operation Vula, and Shaik had been appointed Vula's head of intelligence. According to Shaik, the project got its name from Tambo, who had said of certain reports from the Nightingale that "I believe they are as true as the Bible."

== Exposure ==
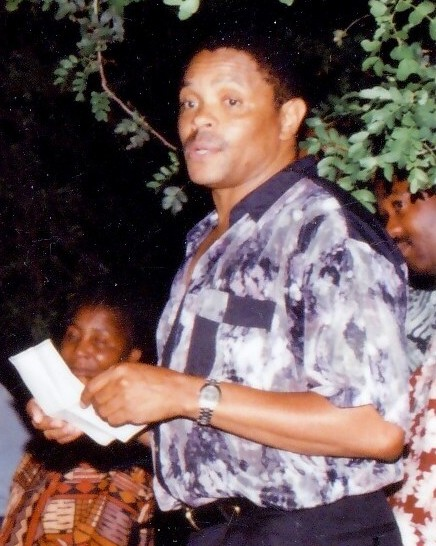
Vula deputy commander Siphiwe Nyanda was charged with terrorism

Operation Vula continued to operate secretly, with Mandela's blessing, even once the ANC had been unbanned and Mandela, recently released, had taken over the ANC leadership following Tambo's stroke. However, in July 1990, during a raid in Durban, the Security Branch uncovered evidence of Operation Vula, including communications between Vula operatives and the ANC headquarters in Lusaka. Although a police officer claimed that an ANC member had passed the police information about Vula, the ANC maintained that the police had stumbled upon it by chance. A series of arrests followed, and nine operatives were charged with terrorism under the Internal Security Act of 1982. Those were Maharaj, Nyanda, Pravin Gordhan, Billy Nair, Raymond Lala, Dipuo Catherine Mvelase, Susanna Tshabalala, Dipak Patel, and Amnesh Sankar. Eight were brought on trial in October, accused of plotting "to seize power from the government by means of an armed insurrection" and "to recruit, train, lead, and arm a revolutionary army," while other operatives, including Ronnie Kasrils, went back into exile or further underground. The police also claimed to have seized twenty arms caches, one of which it claimed had contained a ground-to-air missile.

Especially given that the ANC had recently signed the Groote Schuur Minute, the discovery of Vula – and the arrest of high-profile ANC leaders – destabilised the ongoing process of negotiations. The media referred to the operation as "the Red Plot," and the ANC reportedly spent some time distancing itself from it, before ultimately admitting that it had been sanctioned at the highest levels. In August 1990, the ANC formally ended its armed struggle upon signature of the Pretoria Minute, according to Ellis motivated by "the embarrassment resulting from Vula's exposure." All Vula operatives were indemnified by mid-1991.

Two ANC operatives detained in July 1990, Charles Ndaba and Mbuso Shabalala, were missing until 1998, when the Truth and Reconciliation Commission found that they had been arrested and killed by the Security Branch and their bodies thrown in the Tugela River. According to the testimony of a policeman, Ndaba and Shabalala were killed after refusing to turn on the ANC.

== Legacy ==
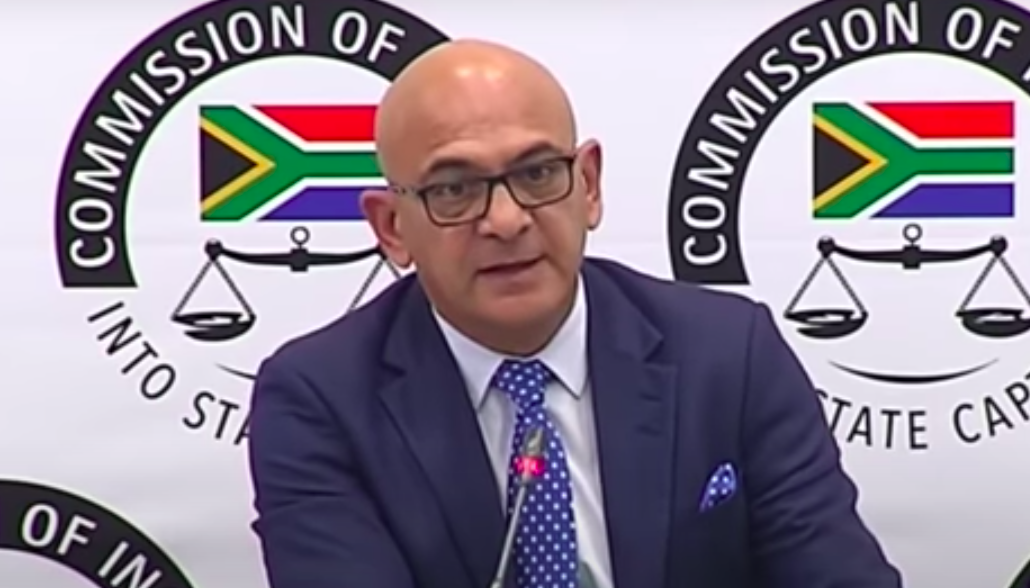
Moe Shaik at the Zondo Commission in 2019

Journalist Sam Sole of amaBhungane later suggested that relationships forged through Vula influenced the factional composition of the ANC of the early 2000s, with one internal group coalescing around former Vula operatives (mostly from Natal, mostly with strong links to the SACP, and aligned to Deputy President Zuma) and another around President Mbeki, who had not been involved in Vula.

In September 2003, Maharaj and Moe Shaik (by then the former transport minister and a foreign ministry adviser respectively) leaked to City Press that Bulelani Ngcuka, then the National Director of Public Prosecutions and an apparent Mbeki ally, had probably been an apartheid spy, nicknamed "Agent RS452." They were ultimately unable to substantiate the allegation, which they said was based on the tentative conclusion of an investigation into Ngcuka by ANC intelligence, which Operation Vula had relied on. The specially appointed Hefer Commission, chaired by former judge Joos Hefer, investigated. The commission's report, released in January 2004, dismissed the allegation and called a further allegation by Shaik – that Ngcuka had used the National Prosecuting Authority to investigate the former ANC intelligence operatives who had uncovered his alleged duplicity (including Maharaj, Zuma, and Shaik's brother) – "so implausible that it deserves no serious consideration." By then, human rights lawyer Vanessa Brereton had announced that she had been Agent RS452.

== Former operatives ==
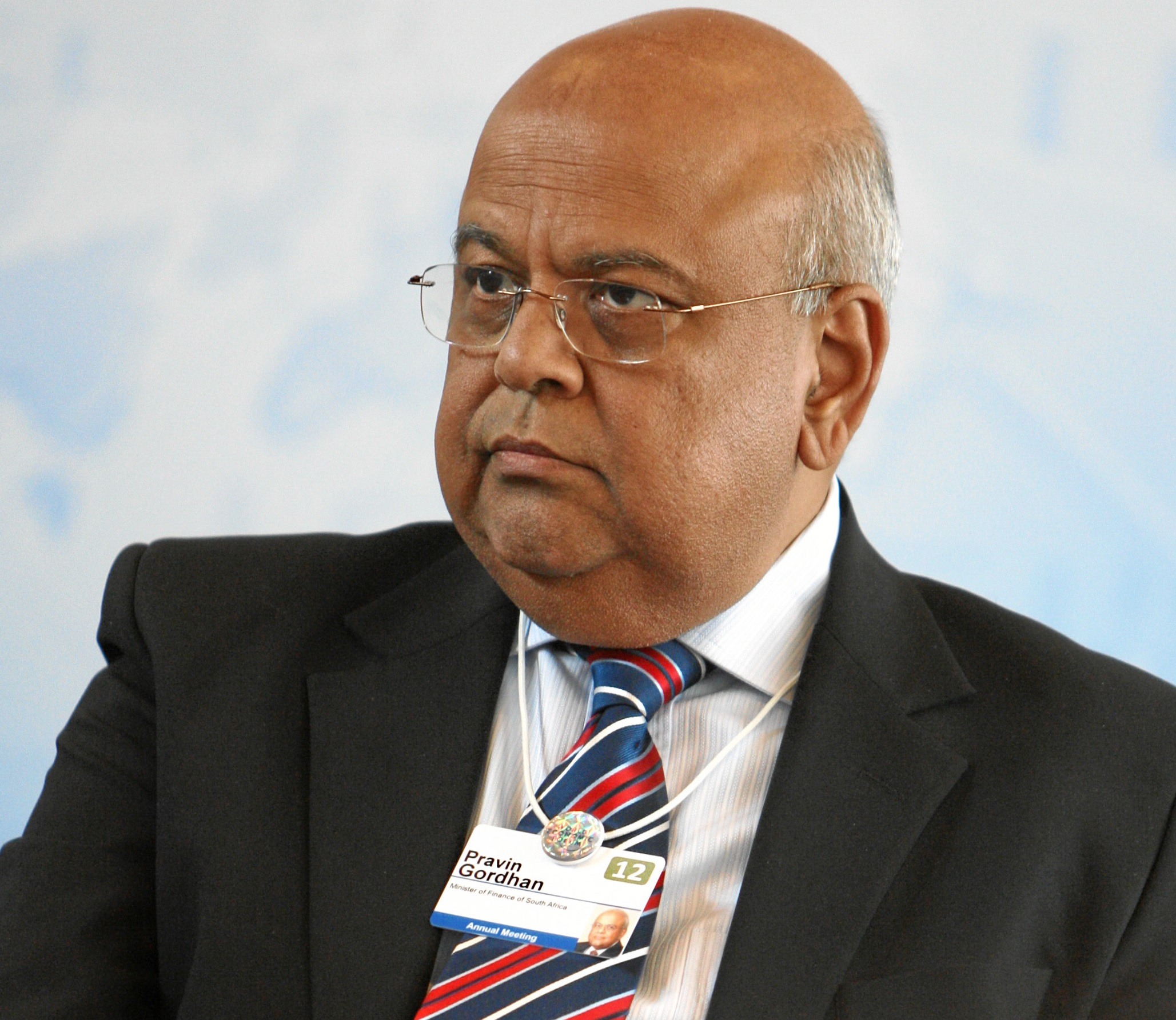
Pravin Gordhan was one of several Vula operatives to become a member of Cabinet after 1994

Former Vula operatives include:

- Mac Maharaj
- Siphiwe Nyanda
- Pravin Gordhan
- Tim Jenkin
- Ronnie Kasrils
- Nathi Mthethwa
- Billy Nair
- Charles Nqakula
- Ivan Pillay
- Moe Shaik
- Schabir Shaik
- Solly Shoke
- Jacob Zuma

== See also ==
- Umkhonto we Sizwe
- Third force
- History of the African National Congress
