= Crime Intelligence Division =

South African intelligence agency

The Crime Intelligence Division of the South African Police Service is an intelligence agency that tracks criminal elements within the Republic of South Africa. It is run by a Divisional Commissioner, who is also a member of the National Intelligence Co-Ordinating Committee (NICOC), to which they report.

The main functions of the CI division are:

- Operational Support.
- Crime Information Analysis Centre.
- Crime Information Management Centre.
- Counter Intelligence.
- Covert Intelligence.
- Crime Intelligence Collection.

In the 2020s, the Division has been under scrutiny by observers for misconduct. In 2024, the head of Crime Intelligence for the Western Cape was formally dismissed under misconduct grounds. In 2025, allegations were again raised against the police division, raising concerns around corruption, instability and leaks.
