= COMSEC (South Africa) =

COMSEC (formally Electronic Communications Security (Pty) Ltd) is a company owned by the Government of South Africa through its National Intelligence Agency.

COMSEC's main task is to secure South African government communications against any unauthorized access and also from technical, electronic or any other related threats. The company also provides verification services for electronic communications security systems, products and services used by the South African government.

The company was established by an act of government private company in 2002 in order to ensure that critical electronic communications of South African government were protected and secured. Prior to the establishment of the company, provision of communication security was fragmented in government.

The Chief Executive Officer of COMSEC (as of July 2005) is Ms. Taki Netshitenzhe.
