= South African Secret Service =

Intelligence agency of South Africa

Agency overview
- Formed: 1 January 1994
- Preceding agency: National Intelligence Service
- Jurisdiction: Government of South Africa
- Headquarters: Arcadia Building, Pretoria
- Minister responsible: Ayanda Dlodlo, Minister of State Security
- Agency executive: Mr Robert McBride, Director
- Website: www.sass.gov.za Archived 28 November 2004 at the Wayback Machine

The South African Secret Service (SASS) was the previous name of a South African intelligence agency. Currently, it is known as the Foreign Branch of the State Security Agency. It is responsible for all non-military foreign intelligence and for counterintelligence within the Service itself. It is also responsible for gathering, correlating, evaluating and analysing this intelligence.

== History ==
The SASS was formed in 1994 following South African first multiracial elections. It was created to take over the foreign intelligence functions of the now-defunct National Intelligence Service (NIS), with the domestic intelligence responsibilities taken up by the National Intelligence Agency (NIA). Both the SASS and NIA were created as part of the Intelligence Act of 1994. The service performs intelligence at the request of the President and the Minister of State Security. The Service is run by a Director-General. Prior to 2009, the Service was a self-governing organisation which was a member of the National Intelligence Co-Ordinating Committee (NICOC). Since 2009, the South African Secret Service is now a division of the State Security Agency (South Africa) and still responsible for foreign intelligence, retaining its own branch Director. The State Security Agency Director General and the SASS foreign intelligence Director in turn report via the National Intelligence Co-Ordinating Committee to the Minister of State Security. In August 2013, the Minister for State Security, Siyabonga Cwele, announced the new foreign intelligence Director as Batandwa Siswana. Other appointments made at the same time were Joyce Mashele as deputy director general for collection, Africa and Matshidiso Mhlambo as deputy director general for the rest of the world.

== Directors-General ==
- 1995 – 1996 Mike Louw
- 1996 – 1999 Billy Masetlha
- 1999 – 2009 Hilton Dennis
- 2009 – 2012 Mo Shaik
- 2012 – 2013 Simon Ntombela (acting DG)
- 2013 – 2016 Batandwa Siswana
- 2016 – 2020 Joyce Mashele (acting DG)
- 2020 – 2021 (suspended) Robert McBride
- 2021–present Joyce Mashele (acting DG)

== Current status ==
The Service is extremely secretive about its operations, and thus few details reach the public. However, when taking current South African policy and concerns into account, it appears the attentions of the SASS are currently focused on two main areas: The activities of Al-Qaeda and similar groups abroad in relation to South Africa's security, and the activities of illegal South African mercenaries, most especially in parts of Africa and Iraq.

== In popular culture ==
The SASS appear in the 2017–2018 Millarworld comic book series Kingsman: The Red Diamond, primarily embodied by Agent Kwaito.

== See also ==
- National Intelligence Co-Ordinating Committee
- National Intelligence Agency (South Africa)
