= Niel Barnard =

South African Intelligence chief (1949–2025)

- Born: Lukas Daniel Barnard; 14 June 1949; Otjiwarongo, South West Africa (now Namibia)
- Died: 13 January 2025 (aged 75); Gansbaai, Western Cape, South Africa
- Education: University of the Orange Free State
- Occupations: Academic; intelligence chief
- Spouse: Engela Brand
- Children: Two
- Espionage activity
- Allegiance: Republic of South Africa
- Service branch: National Intelligence Service
- Service years: 1979–1992
- Rank: Director-General

Lukas Daniel Barnard (14 June 1949 – 13 January 2025), known as Niel Barnard, was a South African academic and intelligence chief who was the head of South Africa's National Intelligence Service from 1979 until 1992 and was notable for his behind-the-scenes role in preparing Nelson Mandela and South African presidents P. W. Botha and F. W. de Klerk for Mandela's eventual release from prison and rise to political power.

== Early life ==
Barnard was born in Otjiwarongo, South West Africa (now Namibia) on 14 June 1949. His father was headmaster and chief-inspector of education in SWA/Namibia. Barnard was in his teens at the time of the Rivonia Trial of 1963, in which Nelson Mandela and several other African National Congress leaders were convicted of treason and sentenced to life in prison. He did his compulsory military service in the commando system and reached the rank of captain and then was part of the Citizen Force in Bloemfontein. He met his wife, Engela Brand in 1968 and they married on 1 April 1972.

== Education and university career ==
Barnard began his education at the University of the Orange Free State in 1968, obtaining a Bachelor of Arts in political science and history. He followed this up by completing a Master of Arts in 1972 and a PhD in 1975. By 1973, Barnard was a political science lecturer at the same university. In 1977, he was a senior lecturer and by 1978 a professor of political studies.

== Intelligence career ==
Barnard first came to the attention of P.W. Botha, after he had written a Ph.D. thesis at the University of the Orange Free State, although Barnard would claim in a 1992 newspaper interview that he was unsure as to why he was chosen, not having an intelligence background. In the wake of the Info scandal in which the Bureau of State Security (BOSS) had become mired, Botha appointed Barnard in November 1979 to form a new intelligence service. He started at the Department of National Security (DONS) as Chief Deputy Secretary on 3 December 1979. He would take over at DONS on 1 June 1980 after the retirement of the existing head Alec van Wyk. The Department of National Security was the new name of the Bureau of State Security (B.O.S.S.) and was renamed in September 1978 after the retirement of its head Hendrik van den Berg in June 1978. The National Intelligence Service was announced in 1980.

Central to the new National Intelligence Service was a debate triggered by Barnard, on the strategic objective of the new intelligence structure. Barnard believed that if the referent object is state security, then, in essence, it means that the intelligence structures have to secure the government from its own citizens. As an alternative, Barnard proposed a national security focus, which meant that security could best be achieved by focussing on threats to the nation, rather than the state. In essence, this implied constitutional reform to implement a universal franchise, thereby laying the foundation for the negotiated transition to democracy that took place in CODESA, an event envisaged by NIS.

The logic underpinning the new service was one of national security, which differed fundamentally from the state security paradigm that had underpinned BOSS. Central to this new vision was the core belief that the only way to find lasting security was to develop a nation, and that meant renegotiating the constitution to include all South Africans irrespective of race. As the head of South Africa's National Intelligence Service (NIS), he recognized that his country would have to find a political settlement to eliminate apartheid and that Nelson Mandela would have to play a fundamental role in the process. He first met with Mandela in 1988 at the prison. He met many times with Mandela in order to inform him about the political situation outside the prison and advise him on how to negotiate with the State President of South Africa, P. W. Botha. As secret talks commenced, Barnard arranged to have Nelson Mandela moved from Robben Island to the mainland, to facilitate more regular contact, but also to prevent the media from becoming aware of the status of this contact. To facilitate this process he allowed Operation Vula to continue because this deepened the contact between Nelson Mandela and the exiled leadership of the ANC.

He arranged for Mandela to be given a suit of clothes befitting a future leader, and for future meetings to take place in a private residence near the prison. While counselling both parties on how to come to some agreements on the terms for Mandela's eventual release, he arranged several more meetings. When P. W. Botha's health forced him to resign in late 1989, Barnard continued to facilitate discussions between Mandela and the new State President of South Africa, F. W. de Klerk.

== Career after the NIS ==
Barnard was Director of the NIS from 1980 to 1992, when he was replaced by his long standing deputy Mike Louw. In 1994, Barnard took over a post in the Department of Constitutional Development and Provincial Affairs under Roelf Meyer in the Government of National Unity. It was this core logic that defined the ultimate role that Barnard was to play in creating the political climate behind the scenes for the Convention for a Democratic South Africa (CODESA) that ultimately drafted the constitution underpinning the transition to democracy in 1994.

== Death ==
Barnard died from cancer in Gansbaai, Western Cape, on 13 January 2025, aged 75.
