= National Intelligence Agency (South Africa) =

Secret intelligence agency in South Africa

State Security Agency - Domestic Branch
- National Intelligence Agency List: 10 other official names: Nasionale Intelligensie Agentskap (Afrikaans); IPhiko leliZweloke lobuHloli (Southern Ndebele); I-Arhente yezoBuntlola beLizwe (Xhosa); uPhiko lukaZwelonke lwezoBunhloli (Zulu); Luphiko lweTebunhloli lwaVelonkhe (Swazi); Tirelo ya Bosetshaba ya Bohlodi (Northern Sotho); Lekala la Bohlwela la Naha (Sotho); Lekgotla la Botlhodi la Bosetshaba (Tswana); Ejensi ya Vunhlori bya Tiko (Tsonga); Dzhendedzi la Vhusevhi la Lushaka (Venda)

Agency overview
- Formed: January 1, 1994; 32 years ago
- Preceding Agency: National Intelligence Service (NIS)
- Dissolved: 2009
- Superseding Agency: Domestic Branch of the South African State Security Agency
- Headquarters: Musanda, Pretoria, South Africa; 28°18′24″S 25°51′02″E
- Employees: Classified; 2,500 estimated
- Annual budget: Classified
- Ministers responsible: Ayanda Dlodlo; Zizi Kodwa
- Agency executive: Mahlodi Muofhe
- Parent Agency: State Security Agency

The National Intelligence Agency (NIA) was the previous name of an intelligence agency of the South African government. Currently it is known as the Domestic Branch of the State Security Agency. It is responsible for domestic and counter-intelligence within the Republic of South Africa. The branch is run by a Director, who reports to the Director-General of the State Security Agency. The Director is also a member of the National Intelligence Co-Ordinating Committee (NICOC).

== Origins ==
The NIA was formed in 1994, the same year South Africa's first multi-racial elections were held. It was created to take over from the domestic intelligence segment of the then National Intelligence Service (NIS) with the foreign intelligence functions being taken over by the South African Secret Service (SASS). Both the SASS and NIA were created as part of the Intelligence Act of 1994. They were created out of the six intelligence organisations consisted of the NIS, Department of Intelligence and Security (ANC), Pan African Security Service (PAC), and the three intelligence services of Venda, Transkei and Bophuthatswana. These two new organisations would consist of a total of 4000 people with 2130 from the NIS, 910 from DIS (ANC), 304 from Bophuthatswana Intelligence and Internal Security Service (BISS), 233 from Transkei Intelligence Service (TIS), 76 from Venda National Intelligence Service (VNIS) and the rest from the PASS (PAC).

== Function and mandate ==
The National Strategic Intelligence Act of 1994 defines the primary functions of the National Intelligence Agency (NIA) as being to gather, correlate, evaluate and analyse domestic intelligence to:

- identify any threat or potential threat to the security of the Republic or its people
- supply intelligence regarding any such threat to the National Intelligence Coordinating Committee (NICOC)
- gather departmental intelligence at the request of any interested department of state and without delay to transmit such intelligence that constitutes departmental intelligence to the relevant department
- fulfil the national counter-intelligence responsibility and for this purpose to conduct and coordinate counter-intelligence to gather, correlate, evaluate, analyse and interpret information regarding counter-intelligence to identify any threat or potential threat to the security of the Republic or its people
- inform the President of any such threat
- supply (where necessary) intelligence relating to any such threat to the South African Police Services (SAPS) for the purposes of investigating any offence or alleged offence.

In view of these functions, NIA (the Domestic Branch) is responsible for the following:

- To fulfil a proactive, anticipatory or early warning role of scanning and assessing the total (economic, social, political and environmental) domestic security situation to identify and report to the policy maker or executive departments any signs or warning signals of threats or potential threats to the constitutional order and the safety of the people
- To perform a reactive monitoring role of tracking events when a threat/crime has been identified or a crisis has already arisen, without duplication of the role of the other executive departments. The purpose of this monitoring role is mainly to enhance investigation and prosecution by providing tactical information and intelligence to enforcement and prosecution institutions and to decide the extent and the implications of threats or potential threats to the national security of the Republic and the safety of the people
- To provide an integrated multi-analytical strategic projective assessment of patterns, trends and of security relevant issues, to provide strategic early warning and to enhance NIA's support/involvement in policy formulation.

== Directors-General/Directors ==
The following people have held the position of Director-General or Director since the restructure of the South African intelligence services in 1994:

- 1995–1999: Sizakele Sigxashe
- 1999–2004: Vusi Mavimbela
- 2004–2005: Billy Masetlha
- 2005–2009: Manala Manzini
- 2009–2011: Lizo Gibson Njenje
- 2011–2013: ?????
- 2013–2014: Simon Ntombela
- 2015–2017: Bheki WJ Langa
- 2017-2019: Bob Mhlanga
- 2019-2021: Mahlodi Sam Muofhe

== Organisational structure ==
The Domestic Branch's organisational structure is largely unknown but sources have mentioned the following departments or sections:

- Counter-intelligence
- Domestic collection
- Security

In 1999, the agency employed about 1,500 persons.

== Past names ==
Although commonly referred to as the NIA, the organization has undergone a name change:

- 1 January 1995: National Intelligence Service
- 2 October 2005: Domestic Branch - State Security Agency

== History ==
The history of the NIA has been recorded by the South African media, mostly in the cases were operations have gone wrong or have been leaked, but with all intelligence organisations, their successes remain mostly as state secrets:

=== Sizakele Sigxashe ===
Formerly an intelligence officer in Umkhonto we Sizwe, Sizakele Sigxashe was appointed the first director-general of the NIA on 1 January 1995. His task was to unify a new organization made up of members of many of the pre-1994 intelligence agencies each with its own culture and work techniques.

On 2 October 1995, Muziwendoda Mdluli, NIA chief of security, was found dead in his car in Pretoria from a gunshot wound to his head that would shock the organisation. A pathologist at the inquest would later claim that the suicide shooting was unusual as the victim had shot himself in the forehead and not the right temple. From the documents left at home he may have been investigating apartheid police hit-squads and gun-running to Rwanda. The police investigation went nowhere and an unhappy NIA conducted its own investigation of possible third force involvement with claims later that it had conducted wiretap surveillance on Police Commissioner George Fivaz and other senior policemen further degrading the relationship.

Sigxashe found himself in the news in October 1995 when police were called to his home after it was claimed that he had drawn a pistol on his wife and family. The NIA denied the pistol claim and later said that the police had leaked the allegation to the press resulting in tension between the two organisations.

In 1997, during its move to a new office, centralizing many offices under a single headquarters, it had vehicles and computer equipment stolen with the thieves never found nor brought to justice. In January 1997, the NIA had been instructed by Deputy Intelligence Minister Joe Nhlanhla to do an audit of its service files to determine if any were missing and whether any current personnel were in possession of files or if they had been destroyed as these may be required by Truth and Reconciliation Commission (TRC).

=== Vusi Mavimbela ===
Vusi Mavimbela was appointed as the new Director-General of the NIA on 20 October 1999 replacing Sizakele Sigxashe. Prior to 1994, he was a member of the ANC's Department of Intelligence and Security (DIS) and previously to the new appointment, was Deputy Director-General of the NIA from 1995 to 1997. In his opening address to his new organization, he highlight his aims which included strengthening the NIA deficiencies when it came to discipline and accountability in its corporate culture. Joe Nhlanhla, Minister of Intelligence Services, would also say at the same time that the NIA needed to accelerated its transformation into an institution whose personnel reflect the demographic profile of the country as a whole, united by a commitment to the new, non-racial South Africa and attain "full representativity " in gender, disability and race.

A NIA spokesperson, in November 1999, responded to claims by the Democratic Alliance (DA) of the bugging of their Western Province offices from an adjacent Government building saying there was no reason for surveillance of the organisation, despite the DA ever alleging it was the NIA. During the same month, a Ministry of Intelligence spokesperson said an investigation was under way to investigate claims made in a South African paper, that the NIA were running a counter-intelligence operation against the German Embassy since 1995 after it was claimed the latter was attempting to recruit South African citizens. The paper also claimed that the NIA had attempted to recruit German Embassy workers to establish the reasons for the Germans security services effort and had established a surveillance operation from a house opposite the embassy. On 18 November 1999, a covert security camera had been found in a waste bin opposite the German Embassy which officials would claim was part of an anti-crime operation and not the monitoring of visitors to the building.

In October 1998, police would arrest two members of the NIA after they attempted to cash stolen share certificates worth more than R180 million and the two were also linked to a financial brokerage which had accepted three illegal promissory notes from the Mpumalanga Parks Board, which had been used to secure a R340 million offshore loan. It was said the two members of the NIA had been laundering money through the brokerage and had claimed it was part of a NIA operation to against foreign exchange control violations. When the certificates were cashed by the brokerage in January 1999, the buyer, BFS Capital, established they were stolen and two brokerage members arrested. The two brokerage members later have the charges dropped would later have the charges dropped against them but the brokerage was closed down by the Reserve Bank, but one member would later be arrested in the United States for extradition to Switzerland for fraud. The two NIA members said they would disclose their handlers involvement in court in June 2000, though the handler insisted to the police that the two NIA members had gone beyond their mandate and pocketed profits from the operation. The NIA handler and his unit would later be suspended based on allegations of fraud, misuse of state resources and death threats.

NIA was also involved with the vetting of members of parliament's Joint Standing Committee on Intelligence, who would then appoint the Inspector-General of Intelligence. The Democratic Partys nominee was rejected, having been an old member of the ANC and its intelligence operations prior to 1994 though it was claimed that this not the reason for his rejection.

In early 2000, NIA was accused by Pagad's leader, Abdus Salaam Ebrahim, of being involved in a bombing at the Victoria & Alfred Waterfront in the previous years and the murders and attempted murder of its members. Pagad had led a vigilante campaign against crime and drugs in the Western Cape since 1995. The police dismissed the allegations as false but it appeared that the NIA had infiltrated the organisation.

During April 2000, the NIA and SASS became embroiled in an international fraud that had been initiated by a now former member of the NIA whom had used a series of apartheid-era front companies, created before 1994. The scam, having been discovered, resulted in a group American investors successfully suing the South African government in an American court for $14 million (R94 million). The front companies had been set up in the late 80s by a number of former apartheid South African intelligence officials including Eugene de Kock.

The Scorpions had failed to act on intelligence supplied when in September 2000, the NIA had provide information that Pagad was planning to assassinate a judicial official. Later that month, Cape Town magistrate, Pieter Theron was assassinated outside his house.

At the end of 2004, Mavimbela's appointment ended and he left the public sector for the private sector joining Mvelaphanda Holdings and the Mvelaphanda Group, responsible for business strategy development.

=== Billy Masetlha ===
Billy Masetlha was suspended on 22 October 2005 because of allegations that he had conducted illegal intelligence operation against an ANC official and businessman Saki Macozoma, a Mbeki supporter, a potential alternative candidate for president. It appeared that a succession battle for the presidency was occurring within the ANC between Thabo Mbeki and Jacob Zuma, with high-ranking civil servants involved. Saki Macozoma had complained to Intelligence Minister Ronnie Kasrils that he was under NIA surveillance, an operation that Kasrils was not aware was occurring. The Inspector-General of Intelligence Zolile Ngcakani was asked to investigate the allegations by Kasrils as to whether the operation had taken place and whether it was legal, which took three weeks to investigate, and he announced that it was unlawful and illegal. The other two suspended NIA officials were Gibson Njenje and Funokwakhe Madlala. It appeared that Macozoma become entangled during surveillance of another person in an authorized operation. On 6 November 2005, Gibson Njenje, head of operations of the NIA, who had been suspended because of his illegal surveillance of Saki Macozoma, resigned though he was not involved in the false e-mail issue being investigated by the Inspector General of Intelligence. With the withdrawal of his legal action against Ronnie Kasrils and the later lifting of his suspension, Njenje had resigned with his pension intact and a settlement package included. Njenje would be back with the NIA in four years as its director.

Later in November 2005, Masetlha challenged his dismissal in the Pretoria High Court alleging that Kasrils did not have the right to suspend him while the state alleged that President Mbeki had instructed the latter to suspend him and therefore was legal. On 22 March 2006, President Mbeki announced that suspended NIA director Masetlha's services had been terminated after a breakdown of trust and that trust could not be repaired. His remaining contract would be paid and criminal charges could still be pending. The following day, Inspector General Zolile Ngcakani released details of his investigation of the reasons leading to Masetlha's dismissal. Project Avani initially involved no targeting of individuals but was to evaluate potential threats occurring from the succession battle for the Presidency as well as any foreign interference in it, Zuma's corruption trial, problems from poor service delivery in the townships and lastly the security and stability in the country. Intelligence Minister Ronnie Kasrils was not aware of the project which appeared legitimate though he should have been informed to provide executive oversight because of the sensitivity of the research. Ngcakani alleged that the project had been highjacked by Masetlha which involved the telephonic interception of conversations of senior ANC officials, the opposition, businessmen and civil servants as well as surveillance of some people. He alleged there appeared to be an authorization from Masetlha to fabricate fake intercepted emails externally and which showed divisions in the ANC's succession battle, and these email's were included in a report submitted to President Mbeki.

In December 2006 the High Court in Pretoria ruled that there had been a breakdown of trust and the president was within his right to suspend and then sack Masetlha. Masetlha took his dismissal further by going to the Constitutional Court to get his job back and in October 2007 the court ruled in favor of him receiving all the benefits owed to him but ruled for his dismissal saying President Mbeki had the constitutional right to fire him.

He successfully defended the two other criminal cases he was charged with. In November 2007, Billy Masetlha was acquitted of charges of contravening the Intelligence Oversight Act when it was alleged that he had withheld information from the Inspector-General of Intelligence concerning the NIA's attempt to spy on businessman Sakumzi Macozoma. By January 2009, Billy Masetlha, IT expert Muziwendoda Kunene and former NIA manager for electronic surveillance Funokwakhe Madlala were acquitted in a Pretoria court of fraud charges relating to hoax emails that implicating senior ANC members in a conspiracy against Jacob Zuma.

=== Manala Manzini ===
On 29 March 2006, President Thabo Mbeki appointed Manala Manzini as director general of the National Intelligence Agency, who'd been the acting head since October 2005 with the suspension and eventual termination of Billy Masetlha's services. Manzini's appointment was for three years. Prior to this appointment, he held the position as head of the technical interception division and after his change of position had appointed Arthur Fraser as head of operations and Pete Richer as NIA deputy director general for systems development. During June 2006, he was part of a delegation including the Intelligence Minister Ronnie Kasrils and the SASS, that visited Zimbabwe and President Robert Mugabe with the aim of kick-starting the South African diplomatic effort to resolve the economic and political issues occurring in that country. His tenureship was tarnished in October 2007 with allegations concerning domestic violence being raised by his wife which he himself would confirm later though no government action was taken against him.

In January 2008, Manzini, the NIA, the President Thabo Mbeki and the South African Police Service became involved in preventing National Police Commissioner Jackie Selebi from being charged for corruption by the Scorpions and the National Prosecuting Authority (NPA). Manzini and police Crime Intelligence Service member Mulangi Mphego managed secured an affidavit from the NPA main witness Glenn Agliotti retracting most of his bribery allegations against Selebi and claimed that Gerrie Nel's Scorpions and the NPA were engaged in a political campaign against Selebi and that their chief witness Aliotti had been threatened and intimidated into making the allegations. Agliotti would later recant his affidavit against the Scorpions saying he had been drinking before making the statement and police crime intelligence boss Mulangi Mphego was later arrested and charged with defeating the ends of justice in obtaining the affidavit. Further investigations by the Mail and Guardian in November 2008 would find that Manzini had conducted business undertakings and a dodgy property deal with Tania Volschenk, Glenn Agliotti's landlady and fixer. Other members of the NIA were also involved in business with Volschenk. By May 2010, the State no longer pursued a prosecution against the now former head of police crime intelligence Mulangi Mphego. Selebi was later found guilty of corruption on 2 July 2010, but not guilty of further charges of perverting the course of justice. In May 2008, the NIA claimed that the xenophobic violence against foreigners in the country was being investigated as to whether there was a political aspect to the violence (third force) other than criminal and social reasons, aimed at destabilising and influencing the forthcoming 2009 general elections.

During October 2008, Manzini was accused by Joe Matthews of blocking the official release of a ministerial review of the intelligence services by ex-Minister of Intelligence Ronnie Kasrils despite the report being in the public domain and then attempted to retrieve it from the publisher of the review claiming if had never been declassified. The review recommended significant reforms to the South African intelligence services and called for an end to the vague mandate the National Intelligence Agency (NIA) had to gather domestic political and economic intelligence, which has been open to abuse.

By 9 May 2009, Jacob Zuma had assumed the presidency of South Africa and with Manzini's term ending on 31 August, it became clear that Zuma would prefer a trusted and loyal colleague as the new director general of the NIA with one name being mentioned, Mo Shaik. Manzini's contract, as anticipated, was not extended and on 2 October 2009, Lizo Gibson Njenje was appointed as director of the NIA. On the same date in 2009, the National Intelligence Agency now became a division of the new State Security Agency and would still responsible for domestic intelligence, retaining its own branch Director. The State Security Agency Director General and the domestic intelligence Director in turn report via the National Intelligence Co-ordinating Committee (NICOC) to the Minister of State Security.

=== Gibson Njenje ===
Gibson Njenje prior to his current appointment as director of the NIA in October 2009 had previously been head of NIA operations between 2003 and 2005 before resigning and returning to the private sector with involvement in at least thirty businesses. Prior to the NIAs formation in 1995, he was the Deputy Head of Counter Intelligence in the ANCs Department of Intelligence and Security.

He would hold the current position for almost two years before ANC infighting would again claim a head of the NIA. On 10 September 2011, Brian Dube, spokesman for State Security Minister Siyabonga Cwele, announced director of the NIA, Gibson Njenje, had resigned which was promptly denied by Njenje demanding proof of a resignation letter. It was said that his relationship with President Jacob Zuma and State Security Minister Siyabonga Cwele had become acrimonious. Reason for his 'resignation' concerned issues with Cwele that included political intelligence gathering operations being conducted on senior ANC members and ministers involved in a succession battle in Mangaung. In parliament, Cwele would not be drawn on the reasons for Njenje resignation nor whether Mo Shaik, foreign intelligence branch director and Jeff Maqetuka, State Security Agency director-general would lose their jobs too.

Other reasons mentioned for the breakdown included Cwele's lack of experience and management style in relation to the security environment and intelligence protection for his wife, Sheryl, during her drug-smuggling trial that resulted in her conviction and sentence to 12 years in jail which she would appeal. By 2013 it was believed the real reason for the 'resignations' was the intelligence agencies investigation of the Gupta family's influence of South African political leaders and government officials, regarding it as a threat to national security but when Cwele found out, he had the investigation stopped.

=== Dennis Dlomo ===
Dennis Thokozani Dlomo has been appointed National Intelligence Co-ordination Committee (Nicoc) intelligence co-ordinator on the 2 August 2013. No sources say who was the acting director of the domestic branch (NIA) was, but during the 2011-2013 period, Dlomo was the acting director-general of the State Security Agency.

=== Simon Ntombela ===
In August 2013, the Minister for State Security, Siyabonga Cwele, announced the new Domestic Intelligence Director as Simon Ntombela. Previous to this appointment, Ntombela had been the acting director of the foreign intelligence branch (old South African Secret Service). Other appointments made at the same time were Nozuko Bam Deputy Director: Domestic Collection, Africa and Thulani Dlomo as Deputy Director: Counter-Intelligence. But by the 3 September 2014, the now new Minister of State Security, David Mahlobo announced that Director of the Domestic Branch of the State Security Agency, Simon Ntombela and Deputy Director General of Domestic Collection Nozuko Bam, both appointed in 2013, have been “redeployed” to the Department of International Relations and Cooperation. DA Shadow Deputy Minister of State Security David Maynier MP expressed concern at the loss of experienced intelligence officials while Thulani Dhlomo, Deputy Director Counter Intelligence was retained despite serious allegations of corruption against him. He would refer the matter to Chairperson of the Joint Standing Committee on Intelligence (JSCI), Connie September to investigate. Ntombela was later appointed South African Ambassador to Poland.

=== Bheki WJ Langa ===
Bheki WJ Langa was appointed head of the domestic branch of the State Security Agency on 1 August 2015 filling the post that remained empty since the redeployment of Simon Ntombela in September 2014. Prior to his appointment, he was an ambassador to China and has a PhD in economics and prior to 1994 received comprehensive intelligence training in Russia. During January 2015, the State Security Agency was rocked by the leaking of NIA intelligence documents to the news agency al-Jazeera where the NIA was described by a quote from an intelligence officer to The Guardian as being politically factionalised and penetrated by foreign agencies.

== See also ==
- National Intelligence Service (NIS)
- State Security Agency (SSA)
- South African Secret Service (SASS)
- National Intelligence Co-Ordinating Committee (NICOC)
