= Mzwai Piliso =

Umkhonto we Sizwe commander (died 1996)

Personal details
- Born: 1922/1923 Transkei, Cape Province; Union of South Africa
- Died: 25 June 1996 (aged 73) East London, Eastern Cape; South Africa
- Party: African National Congress
- Other political affiliations: Umkhonto we Sizwe

Mzwandile "Mzwai" Piliso (died 25 June 1996) was a South African politician and former anti-apartheid activist. He was a member of the National Executive Committee of the African National Congress (ANC) from 1962 to 1985 while the organisation was banned in South Africa and operated in exile. He is best known for his tenure as head of the National Intelligence and Security Department (NAT) of Umkhonto we Sizwe (MK), the ANC's armed wing, and briefly represented the ANC in the post-apartheid National Assembly after the 1994 elections.

A pharmacist by profession, Piliso joined the ANC's external mission in 1960 and represented it abroad in Cairo and Dar es Salaam for the next decade. From 1976 to 1980, he was MK's regional commander in Angola and head of personnel and training. ANC president Oliver Tambo appointed him as director of NAT in 1981. His tenure at NAT over the next five years coincided with serious abuses by the department's internal security wing, known as Mbokodo, which tortured and even executed suspected spies and brutally suppressed a mutiny by MK recruits. Piliso's role in these abuses made him a controversial figure: although there was no question that Piliso had sanctioned and participated in some abuses, including the torture of at least one MK member, there remains debate about the extent to which he bears personal and principal responsibility for Mbokodo's conduct.

== Early life and career ==
Piliso was born in 1922 or 1923 to a Xhosa family in the Transkei in the former Cape Province. He had relatives who were senior members of the African National Congress (ANC), among them Joyce Piliso-Seroke, and joined the organisation in the late 1940s.

However, shortly afterwards, Piliso left South Africa for Edinburgh, Scotland, where he qualified as a pharmacist; he subsequently worked as a pharmacist in London, where he saved up capital to start his own pharmacy in the Transkei and where he was probably not politically active, though he claimed that he had joined the Communist Party of Great Britain.

== External mission of the ANC ==
=== Cairo and Dar es Salaam: 1960–1970s ===
In 1960, Piliso met in London with Oliver Tambo, an ANC leader who had gone abroad to establish a headquarters-in-exile for the recently banned ANC. Tambo encouraged him to join the ANC's external mission, and in June of that year he, with Tambo, represented the ANC at the founding meetings of the abortive South African United Front (SAUF), a coalition of anti-apartheid organisations also including the Pan Africanist Congress (PAC), the South African Indian Congress, and the South West African National Union. Shortly afterwards, Piliso was sent to Cairo, Egypt, where he led the SAUF's Egyptian mission together with his PAC counterpart, Vusi Make.

When the SAUF was disbanded in March 1962, the ANC established its own office in Cairo, headed by Piliso. From then until the early 1970s, Piliso was a diplomatic representative of the ANC abroad, in Cairo until 1965, then as chief representative in Dar es Salaam until 1969, and then in Cairo again. In this capacity, he often travelled abroad; he established contact between the ANC and the sympathetic governments of the Soviet Union, the People's Republic of China, and the German Democratic Republic, and he was responsible for arranging military training in Egypt for recruits of Umkhonto we Sizwe (MK), the ANC's armed wing.

In addition, from 1962 until 1985, Piliso was a member of the ANC's National Executive Committee (NEC), based initially in Tanzania and then in Zambia. In early 1969, he was appointed as a member of the seven-man disciplinary tribunal appointed for the sentencing of Chris Hani and the other signatories of the Hani memorandum, an open letter that was highly critical of MK's leadership; Hani later told historian Vladimir Shubin that Piliso had intervened to advocate for a less severe punishment. Piliso was re-elected to the NEC later in 1969 at the ANC's Morogoro Conference, and was also appointed to the NEC's new Revolutionary Council, established to coordinate the anti-apartheid struggle inside South Africa.

=== Angola: 1976–1980 ===
In the early 1970s, Piliso left Cairo to receive military training in the Soviet Union at his own request. He thereafter took a long leave with his family in Burnley, England. From 1976 to 1980, he was MK's overall head of personnel and training, with responsibility for all MK camps and training, as well as MK regional commander in Angola; he was deputised by Andrew Masondo, Ronnie Kasrils, and Julius Shekeshe. The two posts were compatible because Angola became MK's main base during the period in question, and its camps accommodated the vast majority of the many MK recruits who left South Africa in the aftermath of the 1976 Soweto uprising.

=== NAT and Mbokodo: 1981–1987 ===
In early 1981, Tambo appointed Piliso as director of the ANC's National Intelligence and Security Department (NAT), which at the time was highly preoccupied with concerns about ill-discipline and spying in MK camps. In his new post, Piliso was based in Lusaka, reported directly to Tambo, and was allowed to select his own personnel from the ranks of MK. Initially deputised by Joe Gqabi, Piliso oversaw each of the three wings of NAT: intelligence, security, and processing and administration. The security wing, nicknamed Mbokodo (Xhosa for "the grinding stone"), became notorious among the MK rank-and-file for its abuses, particularly in the camps' detention centres. Possibly with an explicit brief from the NEC to root out spies, in 1981 Piliso presided over the so-called Shishita, a clean-up operation which led to the executive of several alleged spies, and he later presided over NAT's repressive response to the Mkatashinga mutiny of 1983.

Those incidents led to an internal commission of inquiry and a decision to overhaul NAT, discussed at the ANC's next conference in Kabwe, Zambia in mid-1985. Piliso was dropped from the NEC elected at Kabwe, but he continued to represent NAT on the NEC's Politico-Military Council, the successor to the earlier Revolutionary Council. Over the next two years, NAT's governance structures were reformed and then suspended, until in 1987 the entire directorate was dissolved and replaced, and Piliso was transferred to become head of the ANC's Manpower Development Department.

== Return to South Africa ==
=== Political offices ===
In 1990, the apartheid government unbanned the ANC, which was therefore able to return to South Africa to undertake negotiations to end apartheid, and Piliso continued as head of the manpower department after the ANC relocated to headquarters at Shell House in Johannesburg. In South Africa's first post-apartheid elections in 1994, Piliso was elected to represent the ANC in the National Assembly, the lower house of the new South African Parliament. However, he resigned soon into his term and was appointed as an adviser in the office of Raymond Mhlaba, the inaugural Premier of the Eastern Cape.

=== Inquiries into NAT abuses ===
The return of MK recruits to South Africa was accompanied by media attention to their experiences in exile, and the ANC established two separate internal commissions of inquiry to investigate complaints in 1992–1993. During both inquiries, Piliso acknowledged his responsibility for having allowed NAT abuses to continue under his command.

The first of the commissions reported that Piliso had "candidly" admitted that Shishita had been based on intelligence extracted from recruits under torture; he told the commission that he had personally participated in beating a suspect in 1981, believing that information about a presumed assassination plot had to be extracted "at any cost". When the report was published in 1992, Piliso was the only MK commander identified by name as having participated in torture, and in general the report "fairly clearly attached a degree of personal responsibility" to him, even to the extent of assigning him "principal blame" for NAT's conduct. He received substantial media attention as a result, with the Weekly Mail's front page declaring him the "ANC's torture chief". The report of the second inquiry, which was initiated soon afterwards, named others but not Piliso.

Debate about Piliso's role continued after his death when the Truth and Reconciliation Commission held hearings on MK abuses, during which the ANC insisted that such abuses had been neither widespread nor systematic. The commission specifically asked the ANC how it "justifies the fact that Mzwai Piliso and [MK commissar] Andrew Masondo retained senior posts in the post-1994 administration". The ANC responded that both had been "seriously censured by the leadership of the ANC", with Piliso removed from NAT and the directorate restructured. It argued:

These officials [Piliso and Masondo] both performed well and with loyalty to the ANC in their new postings... To continue punishing these officials endlessly would be contrary to humane practice, and to the ANC's belief that after rehabilitation those members who had erred should be reintegrated fully into structures. In addition, these officials had not acted with personal vindictiveness; they had acted within the broader context of weaknesses and problems afflicting the ANC as a whole...

During the hearings, Piliso was linked to specific abuses – specifically to the death of Joe Seremane's brother, Timothy, a suspected spy – and more broadly was, with Masondo, "widely... held responsible for letting conditions in Angolan camps get out of control". ANC historians Stephen Ellis and Paul Trewhela, both noted critics of the exiled MK leadership, both questioned this assumption, suggesting that abuses were widespread and both preceded and outlasted Piliso's tenure at NAT; Piliso's supporters, such as Vladimir Shubin, argued that Piliso was simply one of the few prepared to "carry the can" and act as the ANC's scapegoat.

== Personal life and death ==
Piliso was married to Joyce, with whom he had children; while working for the ANC, he rarely saw his family, who lived in England. He developed diabetes upon his return to South Africa and died of related illness on 25 June 1996 at St Dominic's Hospital in East London. The campus of the South African National Academy of Intelligence in Mafikeng is named after him.
