= National Intelligence Co-ordinating Committee =

The National Intelligence Co-ordinating Committee (NICOC) is the organisation responsible for co-ordinating the actions and activities of all of South African intelligence agencies, and collating the intelligence information received from them. It reports to Cabinet level via the Minister of State Security, and is similar to the British Joint Intelligence Committee.

== Role of the Committee ==
The functions of the National Intelligence Co-ordinating Committee, as outlined in the document in 2008 by the Ministerial Review Commission on Intelligence, are to:

- Co-ordinate the intelligence collected by the South African intelligence services;
- Interpret the intelligence collected to identify and detect threats to South African national security;
- co-ordinate and prioritise intelligence activities within the national intelligence structures;
- prepare and interpret intelligence estimates;
- make recommendations to Cabinet on intelligence priorities.

== Committee Structure ==
The South African General Intelligence Laws Amendment Bill, 2011, sets out the structure of NICOC as:

- The Co-ordinator for Intelligence.
- The Director-General of the State Security Agency.
- The Director or Head of the domestic intelligence division known previously as the National Intelligence Agency.
- The Director or Head of the foreign intelligence division known previously as the South African Secret Service.
- The Head of the Crime Intelligence Division of the South African Police Service.
- The Chief of the South African National Defence Force Intelligence Division.
- The Director of the Financial Intelligence Centre.

== Current status ==
On 3 September 2014, State Security Minister David Mahlobo announced that the Head of the National Intelligence Co-ordinating Committee Dennis Dlomo, appointed to the role in 2013, has been “redeployed” to the Department of International Relations and Cooperation.

Madlanga Commission

The committee's acting coordinator Dr Ntandazo Sifolo revealed that NICOC was part of the coordination efforts that led to the 6 July 2025 media briefing, by SAPS Kwa-Zulu Natal Provincial Commissioner Lieutenant General Nhlanhla Mkhwanazi. The committee also took over the GCI Ops operations that led to the illegitimate arrests of SAPS Crime Intelligence Head Lieutenant General Dumisani Khumalo and five other senior crime intelligence officials by IDAC (Investigative Directorate Against Corruption).

NICOC established that these arrests were in effort to capture the country's intelligence and judicial system, and it was infiltration by cartels into the law enforcement agencies to take control of SAPS. Dr Ntandazo Sifolo during his public testimony at Madlanga Commission told the Chief Evidence Leader Advocate Matthew Chaskalson SC, hadn't NICOC intervened and took over the GCI Ops operations back in February 2025, "The country was gone" and would be in the hands of the cartels' networks.

== Co-ordinators for Intelligence ==
The following people have held the position of Co-ordinator since the restructure of the South African intelligence services in 1994:

- 1995 – 1996 Mo Shaik
- 1996 – 2001 Linda Mti
- 2001 – 2005 Jeff Maqetuka
- 2005 – 2007 Barry Gilder
- 2007 – ???? Silumko Sokupa.
- 2013 – 2014 Dennis Dlomo
- 2015 - 2016 Dr Clinton Swemmer (PhD) (acting?)
- 2016 - 2017 Dr Mike Masiapato (PhD) (acting)
- 2017 - 2026 Ambassador Gab Msimang (acting)
- 2026 - to date Dr Ntandazo Sifolo (PhD) (acting)
