= National Communications Centre =

The National Communications Centre (NCC) is a South African intelligence agency, and is responsible for bulk electronic surveillance and eavesdropping (otherwise known as SIGINT) of foreign communications. In this respect it serves a role similar to that of the United Kingdom's Government Communications Headquarters or United States National Security Agency. A 2019 High Court case ruled that its bulk surveillance and interception of foreign signals work was unlawful.
