= Department of Intelligence and Security (South Africa) =

Department of Intelligence and Security (DIS) is a defunct security service of the African National Congress (ANC) in exile. The existing service, the Department of National Intelligence and Security (NAT) was reformed between 1985 and 1987, which resulted in the new organisation.

== Background ==
Due to human rights abuses in the ANC camps by the security section of NAT, at the May 1985 Kabwe Conference, it was decided to restructure the department with that task falling to Joe Nhlanhla, Jacob Zuma, Alfred Nzo and Sizakele Sigxashe. By 1987 the Department of National Intelligence and Security was restructured and would assist the ANC to negotiate with the South African government's National Intelligence Service. The new department was called the Department of Intelligence and Security (DIS).

== Known directors and members ==
- Joe Nhlanhla - Director
- Jacob Zuma - Deputy Director

Other members of DIS include:

Gibson Njenje, later to be the head of the National Intelligence Agency in 2009, served as deputy head of counter-intelligence in the ANC's Department of Intelligence and Security.

== Organisational structure ==
- Intelligence
- Counter Intelligence
- Central Information and Evaluation Section
- Security
- Technical
- Administration
