= National Intelligence Service (South Africa) =

Defunct South African intelligence agency

The National Intelligence Service (NIS) was an intelligence agency of the Republic of South Africa that replaced the older Bureau of State Security (BOSS) in 1980. Associated with the Apartheid era in South Africa, it was replaced on 1 January 1995 by the South African Secret Service and the National Intelligence Agency with the passage of the Intelligence Act (1994).

== Background ==
During the Muldergate scandal, in which the Bureau of State Security (BOSS) had become mired, the head of BOSS, Hendrik van den Bergh, resigned in June 1978 and was replaced by Alec van Wyk. The Bureau for State Security was then renamed the Department of National Security (DONS) in September 1978.

On 2 October 1978, Prime Minister John Vorster resigned, and on 9 October, the Defence Minister P. W. Botha was appointed as the new Prime Minister of South Africa. Vorster was appointed as State President on 10 October, but resigned in May 1979 when the results of the Erasmus Commission of Inquiry into the Information Scandal were released in that year. On 20 November 1978, the Bureau of State Security was brought under tighter control as a cabinet portfolio called National Security managed by the Prime Minister, who also held the Minister of Defence portfolio. With the rise of P. W. Botha to prime minister, so the SADF's power increased in cabinet and with that the Directorate Military Intelligence (DMI), which would strive to dominate security issues in the new government and decide its policy and implementation.

In October 1978, Deputy Defence and Intelligence Minister Kobie Coetsee was appointed by Prime Minister Botha to lead a commission of inquiry into intelligence gathering in South Africa and in particular which would be the lead agency. It was believed that it was predetermined that the DMI would be the lead intelligence agency. Botha had decided to split the intelligence gathering ability of South Africa amongst four agencies: the DMI, BOSS/DONS, Security Branch and Foreign Affairs, hoping to reduce the political dominance by one over the others, but the rivalry would continue. At the same time the Erasmus Commission of Inquiry was investigating the Information scandal. Believing that the outcomes of both inquiries were already predetermined, BOSS officials began to shred any documents that could be used against them.

P. W. Botha was looking for an alternative to the policing function of BOSS as well as an alternative to a military view of intelligence, one which would provide long term strategic intelligence to the government about the southern African region and world. He viewed Foreign Affairs as too overt and tainted by the Information Scandal and therefore saw a need to organise BOSS into a new agency based around research and analysis; he removed its old covert operational function and transferred that to the Security Branch of the police.

P. W. Botha appointed Niel Barnard in November 1979 to form a new intelligence service. Barnard would take over the South African Department of National Security (DONS) after the retirement of the existing head Alec van Wyk. The now newly named National Intelligence Service was announced on 6 February 1980. Barnard had to restructure the NIS to a role based on analysis and evaluation, which meant that the old organisation's offensive operational and policing role had to change, resulting in many of the old BOSS/DONS personnel leaving. Research and analysis had been neglected under Van den Bergh, preferring to run things himself.

In November 1980, P. W. Botha ordered a Rationalisation Committee be formed to rationalise the intelligence services so as to improve the co-ordination of intelligence in the State Security Council. This committee met between 14 and 19 January 1981 in Simonstown to finalise the functions of each department. This resulted in the Simonstown Accords with the NIS responsible for political and economic intelligence, counter-intelligence and evaluation. DMI would be responsible for military intelligence and contra-mobilisation within South Africa and externally. The Security Branch would be responsible for counter-subversion within South Africa and externally.

== Directors-General of the NIS ==
- Niel Barnard (1979–1992)
- Mike Louw (1992–1994)

== Organisational structure ==
The NIS organisational structure from 1980 to 1990 was said to have consisted of the following departments or sections:

- Central Evaluation
- Collection ECINT
- Collection Ethological Intelligence
- Collection Military Intelligence
- Collection Police Intelligence
- Collection Subversion
- Counter-Intelligence
- Covert Intelligence
- Directorate “K”
- Foreign Liaison
- National Intelligence Training Academy
- National Signal Intelligence Unit
- National/Special Studies
- Operations

== Role in the end of Apartheid ==
It is said that the NIS may have begun as early as 1984 to facilitate indirect secret talks with the ANC after South Africa signed the Nkomati Accord with Mozambique. These accords resulted in the ANC losing access to its bases in that country and South Africa's Directorate Military Intelligence undertaking to end its support to RENAMO, which however it did not. These indirect talks may have been through third parties of Afrikaner academics and Broederbond members meeting with the ANC overseas.

With P. W. Botha's permission, Neil Barnard, Mike Louw, Kobie Coetzee and Fanie van der Merwe (Director General of the Prisons Department) began more secret but formal meetings with Nelson Mandela, while in the background white Afrikaner academics, politicians, businessmen, journalists and churchmen held both secret and open talks with the ANC overseas. The reason for the government's meetings with Mandela was to understand his views concerning politics and commerce but its main aim may have been to split the exiled ANC from Mandela and find what he knew about the ANC in exile. These meetings were said to have gone on for at least three years. On 5 July 1989, the many secret talks between the South African government representatives and Nelson Mandela led to a secret meeting between P. W. Botha and Mandela, and that only could have happened because Botha thought there was a chance of a negotiable settlement between the government and the ANC.

P. W. Botha suffered a stroke in January 1989 and on 14 August that year he resigned due to ill health. F. W. de Klerk was first appointed to the role of acting South African President and then on 20 September as State President. During August 1989, a resolution was brought before the State Security Council (SSC), now presided over by the acting President De Klerk. The resolution, drafted by Niel Barnard and Mike Louw, and supported by Kobie Coetsee and P. W. Botha prior to the change in presidents, proposed examining the feasibility of entering discussions with the ANC, which was seen by the NIS as the go-ahead to hold discussions. The resolution was adopted by the State Security Council. Maritz Spaarwater, NIS Chief of Operations, would select and prepare a team to arrange the meeting and its security. He made use of Willie Esterhuyse as an intermediary to help set up a communication line with Thabo Mbeki in Dar es Salaam so as to arrange a meeting between the NIS and the ANC in Switzerland. The meeting would be kept secret as there were elements in both the National Party and the ANC who were opposed to talks between the parties.

On 12 September 1989 in Lucerne, Switzerland, Mike Louw, (Deputy-Director NIS) and Maritz Spaarwater (Chief of Operations NIS) met Thabo Mbeki (ANC National Executive Council member) and Jacob Zuma (Deputy Head of the Department of Intelligence and Security – ANC) at a hotel room in the Palace Hotel. The outcome of the meeting was that the ANC was prepared to enter into further discussions with the South African government while the NIS would report back to F. W. de Klerk. On 16 September, Mike Louw and Maritz Spaarwater met de Klerk in Cape Town who became angry when he was told of the NIS meeting but calmed down when shown the authorisation for the meeting by Louw. Further meetings would take place between the NIS and the ANC with Niel Barnard and Joe Nhlanhla, the head of the ANC's Department of Intelligence and Security (DIS).

De Klerk set about dismantling the power of the Directorate Military Intelligence (DMI), returning the management of the country from the State Security Council (eventually abolished) to the Cabinet. As the DMI power ended so the NIS filled the gap left over and now reported directly to de Klerk. The NIS' new task was twofold, one to warn the government of any attempt by elements of the security police, military intelligence and "third forces" to disrupt the government's negotiation's with the ANC. Secondly, between 1990 and 1994, to provide intelligence and insight to the SA government to aid its negotiations with the ANC.

In January 1992, de Klerk made the Constitutional Development Services a full government department, that would negotiate with ANC and other parties at the Convention for a Democratic South Africa (CODESA), and appointed Niel Barnard to the lead that department. Mike Louw, Barnard's deputy was then appointed to the role of head of the NIS on 1 February 1992.

== Amalgamation after the end of Apartheid ==
A Transitional Executive Council (TEC) was formed by an act of parliament in September 1993 and was made up of members of the political parties who had negotiated the transition to free and fair elections that would take place in April 1994. The TEC would essentially run the country until the election and was made up of seven sub-committees, composed of members of the negotiating political parties, with one of those committees responsible for intelligence. This committee was called the Sub-Council on Intelligence and was established in November 1993. The NIS believed its role on this committee was to find a solution to the structure of South Africa's future intelligence service which would be acceptable to all six intelligence services of the various political parties in the country. These six intelligence organisations consisted of the NIS, Department of Intelligence and Security (ANC), Pan African Security Service (PAC), and the three intelligence services of Venda, Transkei and Bophuthatswana.

The second role of the Sub-Council on Intelligence of the TEC, was the daily operation of the country's intelligence and security services. This would be done by means of a Joint Coordinating Intelligence Committee (JCIC) but as the NIS opposed ANC control over the services, the JCIC role changed to one of coordination and investigation of the intelligence services as well as the supply of intelligence to the TEC and the other sub-councils. The JCIC would eventually evolve into the Heads of Combined Services (HOCS) and in 1995 become the National Intelligence Co-ordinating Committee (NICOC).

The SCI and the six intelligence services reached agreement concerning the integration of the ANC and other liberation groups into the existing intelligence and security services in South Africa, the establishment of an Inspector General to oversee the services, a parliamentary committee for intelligence, a code of conduct and a brief defining each services role. After the ANC win at the 1994 elections, Dullah Omar, Minister of Justice, announced the new structure of the intelligence services on 21 October 1994 as well as a White Paper on Intelligence which outlined the future direction of the services.

The Intelligence Service Oversight Act 40; and the National Strategic Intelligence Acts 39 and 38 of 1994; were signed into law by President Nelson Mandela on 23 November 1994.

== End of the NIS ==
The end of the National Intelligence Service came with the establishment of the new South African intelligence bodies on 1 January 1995. Foreign intelligence would be gathered by the South African Secret Service, while domestic intelligence would be handled by the National Intelligence Agency. These two new organisations would consist of a total of 4,000 people with 2,130 from the NIS, 910 from DIS (ANC), 304 from Bophutatswana, 233 from Transkei, 76 Venda and rest from the PASS (PAC). Most NIS managers kept their jobs which prevented the introduction of political appointees and the disruption of intelligence, though some took voluntary redundancy. Joe Nhlanhla would be the first Deputy Minister of Intelligence, later to be a full ministerial role.
