= Department of International Relations and Cooperation =

Foreign ministry of the South African government

- List: 10 other official names: Departement van Internasionale Betrekkinge en Samewerking (Afrikaans); umNyango wezangaPhandlea (Southern Ndebele); iSebe leMicimbi yezaNgaphandle (Xhosa); uMnyango Wezindaba Zangaphandle (Zulu); Litiko Letangaphandle (Swazi); Kgoro ya Merero ya ka Ntle (Northern Sotho); Lefapha la Merero ya ka Ntle ho Naha (Sotho); Lefapha la Merero ya Boditšhaba (Tswana); Ndzawulo ya Timhaka ta Matikomambe (Tsonga); Muhasho wa zwa Nnḓa (Venda)

Department overview
- Formed: 1927; 99 years ago
- Jurisdiction: Government of South Africa
- Headquarters: OR Tambo Building, 460 Soutpansberg Road, Rietondale, Pretoria, Gauteng, South Africa; 25°44′03″S 28°13′53″E
- Employees: 1,993 (2022); 1,276 foreigners (2023)
- Annual budget: R 7.23 billion (2026/27)
- Ministers responsible: Ronald Lamola, Minister of International Relations and Cooperation; Alvin Botes, Deputy Minister of International Relations and Cooperation; Thandi Moraka, Deputy Minister of International Relations and Cooperation
- Department executive: Zane Dangor, Director-General: International Relations and Cooperation
- Website: dirco.gov.za

The Department of International Relations and Cooperation (DIRCO) is the foreign ministry of the South African government. It is responsible for South Africa's relationships with foreign countries and international organizations, and runs South Africa's diplomatic missions. The department is headed by the Minister of International Relations and Cooperation, a position currently held by Ronald Lamola.

== Background ==
Prior to 1927, the British government attended to the external affairs of South Africa, though the latter did have its own trade commissioners that were sent to various countries. In November 1926, at the Imperial Conference, the various prime ministers of the Dominions attended, with conference negotiating what became the Balfour Declaration and an autonomy for the domains within a Commonwealth of Nations. The South Africans could now communicate with the commonwealth countries and others directly without communicating through the countries governors-general. A Department of External Affairs was created inside the prime minister's office on 1 June 1927. In 1931, the Statute of Westminster gave South Africa full sovereignty in regards to external affairs, and confirmed by the Status of the Union Act, 1934.

In 1955, a separate department was created, the Department of External Affairs with its own minister. Prior to that date, foreign affairs were conducted through the office of the prime minister of South Africa. Later known as the Department of Foreign Affairs, it was renamed the Department of International Relations and Cooperation by President Jacob Zuma in May 2009. In the 2010 national budget, it received an appropriation of 4,824.4 million rand, and had 4,533 employees.

According to OECD estimates, 2019 official development assistance from South Africa decreased to US$106 million. In 2022, when Cuba asked for humanitarian medical and food aid, AfriForum managed to obtain an interdict against a pending R50 million payout by the department, labelling it "squandering of taxpayers' money". The chairperson of the Portfolio Committee on International Relations and Cooperation, Supra Mahumapelo, decried the ruling due to its perceived impact on South Africa's solidarity work with countries like Cuba.

== Apostille and document legalisation services ==
As the designated competent authority under the 1961 Hague Apostille Convention, to which South Africa acceded in 1995, DIRCO issues apostille certificates for documents originating from South African government departments destined for use abroad in Convention member states. Eligible documents include birth, marriage and death certificates issued by the Department of Home Affairs, South African Police Service clearance certificates, and academic qualifications evaluated by the South African Qualifications Authority.

Documents that have been notarised by a notary public follow a parallel route via the Registrars of the High Court rather than DIRCO.

For documents destined for countries not party to the Apostille Convention — such as the United Arab Emirates, Qatar and Kuwait — DIRCO performs an authentication step within a longer embassy legalisation chain rather than issuing an apostille.

In February 2026, DIRCO launched a Registered Agent Programme to formally list private service providers authorised to submit documents on behalf of clients.
