= Vincent Smith (politician) =

South African politician (born 1960)

Member of the National Assembly
- In office June 1999 – 7 May 2019
- Constituency: Gauteng

Personal details
- Born: Vincent George Smith; 18 July 1960 (age 66)
- Citizenship: South Africa
- Party: African National Congress
- Education: Rand Afrikaans University
- Known for: indicted on fraud and corruption charges emanating from his tenure as chairperson of the Portfolio Committee on Correctional Services from 2009 to 2014

Vincent George Smith (born 18 July 1960) is a South African politician who represented the African National Congress (ANC) in the National Assembly from 1999 to 2019. In 2020, he was indicted on fraud and corruption charges emanating from his tenure as chairperson of the Portfolio Committee on Correctional Services from 2009 to 2014. He is accused of having accepted bribes from Bosasa, a major contractor of the Department of Correctional Services.

Smith rose to political prominence as deputy chairperson of the ANC's large regional branch in Johannesburg, an office he held from 1995 to 2004. One of the ANC's most active legislators, he was a key figure in the Standing Committee of Public Accounts during its investigation into the 1999 Arms Deal, including as ANC whip from 2002 to 2004. He also played a central role in the ANC's move to amend the Constitution to permit land expropriation without compensation.

== Early life and career ==
Smith was born on 18 July 1960 and has a bachelor of computing from Rand Afrikaans University. He became active in the ANC through the anti-apartheid students' movement and has said that he was active in ANC youth structures in the 1980s, though not much else is known about his activities during apartheid; in his account, "I went to a convent in Natal and resurfaced after 1994".

After the end of apartheid in 1994, Smith joined Transnet, a public entity, as part of its first intake of senior black officials. His political rise began during the same period in the ANC's large regional branch in Johannesburg, where he served three terms as deputy regional chairperson from 1995 to 2004. The Mail & Guardian said that he was reputed to be "at the forefront" of the ANC's assault on local politician Trevor Ngwane, who was suspended from the party in 1999 for criticising a plan to privatise municipal assets. After leaving office as deputy regional chairperson of the Johannesburg ANC, Smith served as its regional treasurer from 2004 to 2008.

== Parliament: 1999–2019 ==
In the 1999 general election, Smith was elected to represent the ANC in the Gauteng caucus of the National Assembly. According to the Mail & Guardian, his nomination was a surprise, because he had not initially appeared on the ANC's party list. Thereafter Smith served four consecutive terms in his seat. He continued to represent the Gauteng constituency, except for his third term between 2009 and 2014; during his third term, he filled a national seat initially designated for Dennis Bloem, who had defected to the Congress of the People and therefore was not sworn in.

=== Standing Committee on Public Accounts ===
Smith rose to public prominence during his first term as the ANC's ranking member and whip in the Standing Committee of Public Accounts (SCOPA), which at the time was investigating the government's highly controversial 1999 Arms Deal. The Mail & Guardian, while admiring Smith's "intelligence, smooth tongue and political acumen", argued that Smith was instrumental in the politicisation and overall "unraveling" of SCOPA. While other ANC members such as Billy Nair and Bruce Kannemeyer were more aggressive than Smith, the newspaper said that Smith derailed SCOPA's investigation by acting as a "master filibuster" and initiator of "partisan bickering". He was compared variously to a torpedo; to "a smaller version of presidential spin-doctor Essop Pahad"; and to the Wolf, the fixer of murder scenes in Quentin Tarantino's Pulp Fiction.

After the 2004 general election, at the outset of Smith's second term in the National Assembly, the ANC nominated him to chair SCOPA, in an unprecedented deviation from the tradition of granting the position to an opposition party. However, less than a month later, the party announced that it would instead support the return of opposition MP Francois Beukman as chairperson.

=== Portfolio Committee on Correctional Services ===
At the beginning of the fourth democratic Parliament in 2009, the ANC nominated Smith to chair the Portfolio Committee on Correctional Services. During his tenure in the chair from 2009 to 2014, the correctional services portfolio received extensive media attention due to allegations of improprieties in multibillion-rand contracts between the Department of Correctional Services and its primary private contractor, Bosasa. The Mail & Guardian published a series of exposés implicating senior officials, including former prisons commissioner Linda Mti, and in March 2011, City Press obtained a leaked copy of the report of an investigation by Willie Hofmeyr's Special Investigating Unit (SIU), which had uncovered extensive prima facie evidence of corruption in the Bosasa contracts.

The unpublished SIU report had been referred to the Smith's committee in November 2009, but the committee did not object to the Bosasa contracts or to their extension. As the Mail & Guardian later observed, the committee did not mention the corruption allegations in its final report to Parliament at the end of the parliamentary term in 2014. Smith later faced questioning about the committee's lacklustre response, and, as investigations into the contracts continued, his term as committee chairperson resulted in criminal charges against him years later.

=== Committee on Constitutional Review ===
By the outset of the fifth Democratic Parliament, Smith had a reputation as "one of the ANC's most formidable legislators" and "ever the party man". After the 2014 general election, the ANC nominated him to chair the Standing Committee on the Auditor-General. At the same time, at different points in the parliamentary term, he chaired several important ad hoc committees: the committee that investigated the fitness of the SABC board; the committee that considered proposals to regulate the party finance; and, most prominently, the ad hoc committee on constitutional review, which considered a proposal to amend Section 25 of the Constitution to allow for land expropriation without compensation. He led the latter committee as it held public hearings in all nine provinces.

However, in early September 2018, Smith said that he had asked to step aside from his committee duties until he had finalised his response to emerging corruption allegations against him. ANC chief whip Jackson Mthembu said that the ANC was "very inspired by the strong sense of integrity and political accountability" shown by Smith's request. Though the allegations pertained to Smith's tenure as chairperson of the correctional services committee, Mthembu suggested that they had been orchestrated by forces opposed to land expropriation without compensation. He told the media:

Whilst we do not understand the motive behind those who put this story in the public domain‚ we can only suspect that their timing is inspired by the ANC's position on the expropriation of land without compensation. In recent weeks‚ [Smith] has been on national and international platforms articulating the ANC's position on the expropriation of land without compensation. We are therefore convinced that he is a target of the organisations who are vehemently opposed to our people getting access to the land that they were dispossessed from by colonial and apartheid oppressors.

The corruption allegations dominated the remainder of Smith's fourth term in Parliament, and he vacated his seat after the 2019 general election.

== Relationship with Bosasa ==
=== Media reports ===
In 2018, while Smith was a senior MP and amid a broader media storm about alleged state capture during the presidency of Jacob Zuma, Smith was implicated in possible corruption in the correctional services portfolio during his tenure as chairperson of the relevant committee from 2009 to 2014. On 2 September 2018, News24 reported that it had seen evidence that Bosasa had paid a total of R671,000 to Smith's company, Euro Blitz 48, in two payments in 2015 and 2016. The payments were in addition to other benefits – the installation of a R200,000 security system and monthly cash payments – that Smith was alleged to have received from Bosasa and its chief executive, Gavin Watson. The opposition Democratic Alliance (DA) called for a parliamentary investigation into a possible conflict of interest.

In a statement, Smith denied that he had received the additional benefits but said that he had received R671,000 as a personal loan from former Bosasa chief operations officer Angelo Agrizzi. According to Smith, he had used the loans to pay for his daughter's university education in Wales. He said that he would welcome and cooperate with any ethics inquiry and that he would step aside from his committee chairmanships until the matter was finalised.

=== Zondo Commission ===
==== Agrizzi's testimony ====
In late 2018, Agrizzi announced his decision to turn whistleblower and expose corruption at Bosasa, his former workplace. In January 2019, during his testimony to the Zondo Commission, he denied Smith's account of the Bosasa payments, saying that the money was neither loaned to Smith nor paid by Agrizzi in his personal capacity; instead, the payments were part of a deliberate scheme by Bosasa to co-opt members of the correctional services committee and thereby "manage the negative impact" of media reports about corruption. According to Agrizzi, Bosasa executive Gavin Watson had paid monthly cash payments to Smith and two other ANC MPs on the committee, Vincent Magagula and Winnie Ngwenya.

In March, Agrizzi elaborated on his account, telling the commission that the relationship between Bosasa and Smith had been facilitated by another senior ANC MP, Cedric Frolick, whom Agrizzi claimed was also on the Bosasa payroll. In Agrizzi's account, Bosasa had first met with Smith in around 2010 with Frolick assisting to "break the ice"; Smith was at the time "very anti-Bosasa" and Watson had asked Frolick to "do whatever he could do to win over Vincent Smith, or alternatively find a way to have him moved".

==== Smith's testimony ====
When Smith himself appeared before the Zondo Commission in 2020 and 2021, he continued to maintain that the money he had received from Bosasa was a personal loan from Agrizzi. In addition, he admitted that, while committee chairperson, he had met with Bosasa officials at a hotel in Sandton, but he claimed that this was an ordinary engagement with portfolio stakeholders and that he and Watson had never discussed the corruption allegations against Bosasa.

Asked by commission chairperson Raymond Zondo why Smith and the committee had not followed up on the SIU's "horrific stories of corruption" in the Bosasa contracts, Smith said that the committee had likely flagged its concern even if not "outrightly", but admitted that, in retrospect, a more blunt warning would have been appropriate. However, he argued that committee minutes reflected that the committee under Smith's leadership had been "anti-outsourcing":

I have no doubt that my stance and the stance of the committee throughout my tenure was not anti-Bosasa, but it was anti-outsourcing. It was not an attack on a company but it was an attack on the management style. There were no holy cows. Bosasa was not a holy cow. I don't understand, chair, that if I was getting R45,000 to do a job, in other words to be soft on them, three years later I'm still as harsh as I am, and they continue to give me that money. It doesn't make sense to me.

==== Findings ====
Part three of the Zondo Commission's final report, released in March 2022, focused on Bosasa and largely accepted the allegations of misconduct by Smith. The commission was concerned about Smith's meetings with Bosasa officials; said that there was no evidence that the payments to Smith had been intended as a loan; and recapitulated prima facie evidence that Smith had received other benefits, including security upgrades at his Roodepoort home and, from 2011, monthly payments of R45,000. The commission noted that Smith appeared in a "black book" kept by Watson under an entry "Vincent Smith 100,000", supporting Agrizzi's claim that, by 2016, the payments were increased to R100,000 monthly at Smith's request.

The report concluded that Smith had breached the "oath sworn by Members of Parliament to uphold the Constitution and to perform their work to the best of their ability". It recommended that Smith's conduct should be referred for investigation and prosecution, though this was largely a technicality because Smith had already been indicted on related charges.

=== Criminal charges ===
In October 2020, Smith was indicted on criminal charges in the Johannesburg Specialised Commercial Crimes Court. He was charged with two counts of corruption – one in a personal capacity and one in his capacity as sole director of Euroblitz 48 – and a count of fraud. The National Prosecuting Authority alleged that he had accepted unlawful inducements in exchange for endorsing the extension of Bosasa's contract with the government; Agrizzi also faced criminal charges for having bribed him. Smith submitted to arrest at a police station in Alberton and pled not guilty to all charges, saying, "I have faith in and trust the South African legal system and that the facts will show that I'm not guilty of the charges levelled against me". He was released on R30,000 bail.

In November 2021, the Investigating Directorate amended the indictment to add charges of tax fraud and money laundering, pertaining to income of about R28 million that Euroblitz 48 had allegedly failed to disclose to South African Revenue Service between 2009 and 2018. He was also charged with breaching the Financial Intelligence Centre Act and faced additional charges unrelated to the Bosasa contract: prosecutors alleged that, from 2005 onwards, he had earned multimillion-rand consultancy fees for using his political influence to accelerate the award of planning permits for two other private companies. With the total indictment now running to 29 charges in total, the trial remained ongoing as of 2022.

In March 2026, Smith was sentenced to direct seven years in jail with 5 years suspended by the Johannesburg High Court.
