= Corruption in South Africa =

Corruption in South Africa includes the improper use of public resources for private ends, including bribery and improper favouritism. Corruption was thought to be at its highest during the period of the alleged "state capture" under the presidency of Jacob Zuma but has remained widespread during the current "New Dawn" presidency of his successor Cyril, negatively "affecting criminal justice, service provision, economic opportunity, social cohesion and political integrity" in South Africa.

South Africa has a robust anti-corruption framework, but laws are inadequately enforced and accountability in public sectors such as healthcare remains below par. According to a 2021 Afrobarometer survey, 76.2% of South Africans believe that ordinary people risk retaliation and other negative consequences if they report incidents of corruption.

A scandal involving the Gupta family and former South African President Jacob Zuma pushed Zuma out of office as a long list of corruption complaints against the former President resurfaced. Complaints against Zuma range from the former leader's lavish spending of state funds, to awarding contracts based on nepotism, and businesses with familial connections or close ties benefiting through their association with him. The Zondo Commission was later created to investigate Zuma and his associates for corruption.

Corruption has also negatively impacted South Africa's ability to resolve the country's long-running energy crisis. Despite efforts to reduce corruption, it remains a significant problem facing the country with a 2024 Afrobarometer survey showing that it has significantly contributed to a large drop in public support for democracy whilst hindering efforts to reduce poverty, unemployment, and inequality.

== Apartheid and corruption ==
Apartheid, a system of discrimination and segregation on racial grounds, dominated the ideology and political system in South Africa from 1948 to 1994. This system, which intentionally excluded non-Afrikaners from civil service jobs, government positions, and politics entirely, came to an end in 1994 when the African National Congress headed by Nelson Mandela conducted negotiations with the South African government at the time.

Before the abolition of Apartheid, the South African civil service was a pervasive medium for rent-seeking and the preferential treatment of Afrikaners. Policies favouring Afrikaner cultural and educational systems, the awarding of government contracts to Afrikaner businesses and the funding of parastatal Afrikaner organisations was a common phenomenon during the era of Apartheid. The building of rural homeland states in the 1980s created ideal projects for rent-seeking with many homeland leaders presiding over massive networks of patronage. A notable corruption scandal during apartheid was the Muldergate scandal that involved the improper use of public funds to conduct a pro-apartheid propaganda campaign; the scandal brought down the government of Prime Minister John Vorster.

During the anti-apartheid struggle, the African National Congress (ANC) was receiving funds from foreign donors in order to build up stronger opposition parties to protest against South Africa's National Party and Apartheid. These leaders were given large sums of money without formal bookkeeping. There are however no reports or evidence of corruption. The ANC's tradition of loyalty to the organization was shaped in the Apartheid era, with clear implications in modern-day ANC politics. In the middle years of Jacob Zuma's presidency, corruption became rampant in most government departments, intelligence agencies, the police and the military.

There is much ongoing debate regarding the origins of corruption and the definition of corruption in South Africa. The inherited bureaucracy and political culture which originated in the Apartheid era have rendered corruption issues hard to trace and tackle. The presidency of Jacob Zuma in 2009 created an environment where corruption flourished under the new leadership. Both the new and old political order created their own types of corruption, benefiting those in their inner circles. Although forms of endemic corruption were passed on to the new order in 1994, new forms of corruption have emerged adding new layers of theft from the State's purse.

== Perception of corruption in South Africa ==
Perception of honesty in the South African public sector from 1995 to 2023. The higher the score, the more honest people perceive the public sector to be. Source: Corruption Perceptions Index via SAIRR (Oct 2020)

In 2013, Afrobarometer found a substantial increase in the public's perception of corruption since 2008. 66% of South Africans believed that the government could be doing more to curb corruption, compared to 56% elsewhere on the continent. South Africans' experience of first-hand corruption ranks among the least on a first-hand basis in Africa. At one stage only 15% of South Africans admit to having paid a bribe. The average percentage of all Africans who have paid bribes to government officials was around 30%.

Between 2011 and 2015, former President Jacob Zuma's public approval ratings almost halved, from 64% to 36%, possibly due to corruption scandals over that period. The majority of South Africans believe that various branches of government should oversee other branches of government's work. Around a quarter of South Africans feel they should be allowed to be responsible for holding elected representatives and leaders accountable.

Transparency International's 2025 Corruption Perceptions Index scored South Africa at 41 on a scale from 0 ("highly corrupt") to 100 ("very clean"). When ranked by score, South Africa ranked 81st among the 180 countries in the Index, where the country ranked first is perceived to have the most honest public sector. Since Transparency International began using its current scoring system in 2012, South Africa's score has varied between a high of 45 in 2016 and its lowest score of 41 in 2023, 2024 and 2025. For comparison with regional scores, the average score among sub-Saharan African countries (Note: Angola, Benin, Botswana, Burkina Faso, Burundi, Cameroon, Cape Verde, Central African Republic, Chad, Comoros, Côte d'Ivoire, Democratic Republic of the Congo, Djibouti, Equatorial Guinea, Eritrea, Eswatini, Ethiopia, Gabon, Gambia, Ghana, Guinea, Guinea-Bissau, Kenya, Lesotho, Liberia, Madagascar, Malawi, Mali, Mauritania, Mauritius, Mozambique, Namibia, Niger, Nigeria, Republic of the Congo, Rwanda, Sao Tome and Principe, Senegal, Seychelles, Sierra Leone, Somalia, South Africa, South Sudan, Sudan, Tanzania, Togo, Uganda, Zambia, and Zimbabwe.) was 32. The best score in sub-Saharan Africa was 68 and the worst score was 9. For comparison with worldwide scores, the best score was 89 (ranked 1), the average score was 42, and the worst score was 9 (ranked 181, in a two-way tie).

In 2021, 9.1% of South Africans believed that corruption was the most important problem facing the country, meaning that corruption ranked second only to unemployment in the priorities of those surveyed. 60.5% believed that the government was doing "very badly" at fighting corruption, and another 15.4% believed that it was doing "fairly badly."

== Types of corruption in South Africa ==
Although South Africa is subjected to various types of corruption, three notable forms are wasteful expenditure, state capture, and corruption related to or using Black Economic Empowerment (BEE) legislation. Recent state capture scandals involving South African politicians and the Gupta family have brought these types of corruption into the public spotlight. Petty corruption is another relevant issue affecting public services and day-to-day life in South Africa. Local municipalities have also been reported as significantly impacted by corruption with Corruption Watch describing them as amongst the most corrupt institutions in the country. A 2022 report by the Global Initiative Against Transnational Organized Crime has described the presence of organised crime as "an existential threat to South Africa’s democratic institutions, economy and people."

Most prevalent sectors with reports of corruption in 2021.
Sector	% of total reports	The most common type of corruption	Province with the highest number of reports (percentage)
Police	10.0%	Abuse of authority	Gauteng (47%)
Schools	5.8%	Abuse of authority	Gauteng (37%)
COVID-19 related corruption	3.8%	Maladministration	
Housing	3.1%	Maladministration	Gauteng (55%)
Health	2.7%	Procurement corruption	Gauteng (41%)
Traffic	2.7%	Bribery and extortion	Gauteng (83%)
Licensing	2.3%	Bribery and extortion	
Mining	1.2%	Maladministration	Limpopo (31%)

=== State capture ===
State capture, a type of systemic political corruption in which private interests significantly influence a state's decision-making processes to their own advantage, became prevalent in South Africa during the presidency of Jacob Zuma (see section below). The most notable incident of state capture is the Gupta family scandal (see section below). State capture in South Africa has been estimated by the government to have cost the country up to R 250 billion (US$ 17 billion) between 2014 and 2017, and reduced the country's GDP growth rate by an estimated 4% a year. Former South African Treasury official Ismail Momoniat has stated that state capture during the Zuma administration caused such severe damage to the South African economy that it effectively reversed all the efforts of the Mandela and Mbeki administrations to develop the country's economy.

=== Black Economic Empowerment ===
Two notable types of corruption related to the government policies of BEE and Broad-Based Black Economic Empowerment (BBBEE) are BEE fronting and political corruption.

==== Political corruption ====
BEE and BBBEE requirements have been used to facilitate state capture in South Africa with government contracts improperly awarded, at inflated prices, to politically connected "tenderpreneurs," sometimes to the detriment of quality and service delivery. A notable criticism of BBBEE is that the policy has been co-opted and repurposed by factions and powerful members of South Africa's political elite, mostly within the governing ANC, for the purposes of corrupt self-enrichment at the expense of South Africans who are not politically connected, thereby fueling the growth of corruption within South Africa, reducing economic growth and increasing unemployment. Moeletsi Mbeki has argued that BEE is the biggest driver of corruption in South Africa.

==== BEE fronting ====
BEE fronting is an abuse of the rules governing BEE, where qualifying persons are given a seat on the board of a company while having no decision-making power in the company, in order to qualify the company for government contracts in terms of BEE. In June 2017, Netcare, a company which operates the largest private hospital network in South Africa, was accused of BEE fronting. Since then, 17 other complaints have been filed against various South African companies regarding BEE fronting. Related to this is Cadre deployment and employment, which is an official ANC policy to colonize the government with officials loyal to the ANC.

=== Petty corruption ===
Petty corruption is a prevalent issue in South Africa's public service sphere. A survey conducted by the ISS National Victims of Crime tested the extent and nature of petty corruption in South Africa. One of the main issues highlighted by this survey is South Africans' lack of access to information regarding how to report corrupt acts. The fear of facing repercussions for whistle-blowing and the pervasive belief that reporting corruption will not cause change are two other concerns revealed by the 2011 survey. Respondents of the survey were most likely to pay bribes to traffic officials, followed by police officers and officials in employment offices. These findings support the notion that the perception of corruption in local government departments such as traffic and municipal policing is high. The frequency of bribes involving police officers is concerning due to their role in tackling corruption and illicit behavior. Only 5.6% of South Africans reported experiencing forms of petty corruption involving money, favours and gifts. Even though the percentage of experienced corruption is low, the high perception of corruption has led respondents to prioritize corruption as the second most prevalent crime in the country.

== Corruption scandals ==
=== Jacob Zuma and corruption ===
Zuma's time in office was marked by controversy and numerous incidences of corruption. His resignation on February 14, 2018, came after months of pressure from the ANC. In April 2018 it was announced that Zuma would be prosecuted on 12 counts of fraud, one of racketeering, two of corruption and one of money laundering. Zuma faced corruption charges involving the US$2.5 billion South African Arms Deal. On 11 October 2019, a South African high court denied Zuma a motion to withdraw the recent criminal charges against him. Zuma was imprisoned for refusing to give evidence to the Zondo Commission resulting in the July 2021 unrest.

==== Nkandla ====
The Nkandla homestead scandal involved the controversial, and possibly corrupt, funding of President Jacob Zuma's personal homestead at public expense. After a home invasion and the subsequent rape of one of Zuma's four wives, Zuma accessed the means to upgrade security measures at his homestead. A report by South Africa's public protector in 2014 found Zuma had inappropriately allocated state funds to finance additional home improvements such as the addition of a swimming pool, amphitheater, visitor centre and cattle enclosure to his property (among others). In 2018, South Africa's highest court found Mr. Zuma guilty of violating the constitution in regard to the lavish spending of R 246 million (US$19.14 million) of State funds on his homestead in Nkandla.

==== Gupta family scandal ====
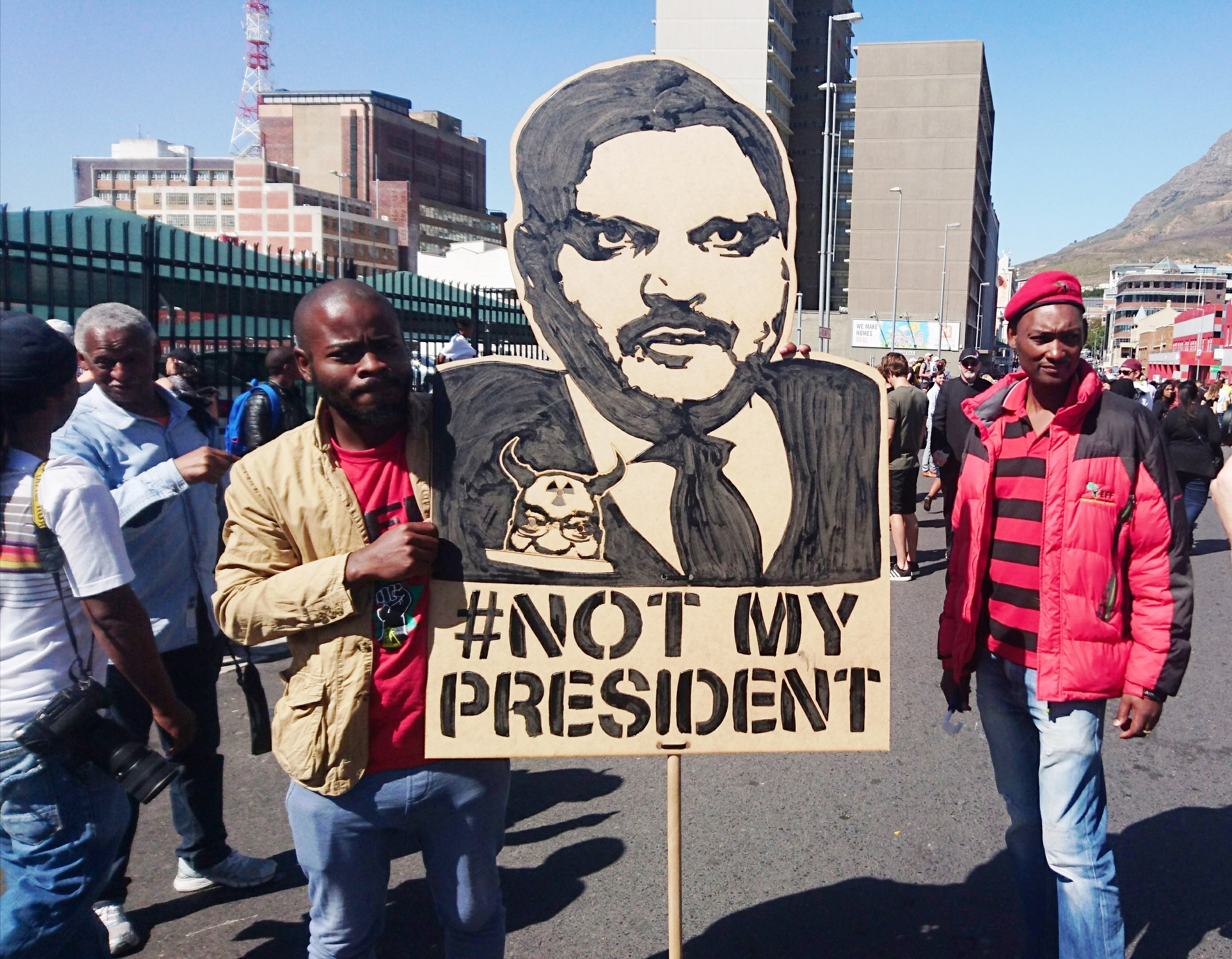
A protest placard depicting Gupta family member Atul Gupta at a protest against corruption during the Zuma administration. The slogan "#Not My President" on the placard explicitly links Atul Gupta with corruption and state capture associated with the Presidency of Jacob Zuma.

Zuma's close relationship with the Gupta family has been highlighted in the former South African Public Protector's report on State Capture.

In 2016, the Public Protector, Thuli Madonsela, investigated the Gupta Family Scandal after receiving a formal complaint from a Catholic priest, Father Stanslaus Muyebe. The State of Capture report released by the Public Protector in 2016 reported on the dangers of state capture in South Africa. The 355-page document reports Mr. Zuma's preferential treatment of the Gupta family and the involvement of Jacob Zuma's son and the Gupta family. The allegations reported include the Gupta Family's involvement in the appointments and removals of members of the South African cabinet, the unlawful awarding of state contracts to Gupta-linked companies or persons, the banks’ preferential treatment of Gupta-owned companies and, Zuma's conflict of interest concerning his position and business dealings. The Gupta brothers, who have been major players in South African business for over a decade began growing their relationship with former President Jacob Zuma in 2003 when he occupied the Office of Deputy President. Since 2003, both parties benefited from an understanding wherein the Gupta family financed the Zuma family while President Zuma appointed friendly officials and awarded lucrative state contracts to the Gupta empire. South African authorities are seeking to recover up to US$4.07 billion lost to these Gupta deals. Jacob Zuma's son, Duduzane and Gloria Ngeme Zuma, one of Mr. Zuma's wives, received large transfers and monthly salaries for positions held at one of the Gupta firms.

The Gupta family has engaged in numerous suspicious transactions involving a series of shell companies and state-owned enterprises. The OCCRP has reported on Transnet's contract with South China Rail and subcontracts with Gupta-run organizations. State-controlled companies like Eskom and Transnet are at the centre of illicit deals with Gupta companies. An arrest warrant for Ajay Gupta was issued in February 2018. Some of the members of the Gupta family – those accused in the corruption case – were reported as residing in the emirate of Dubai as of 11 June 2021. The Bank of Baroda played an important role in facilitating irregular financial transactions for the Guptas.

==== Russian nuclear deal ====
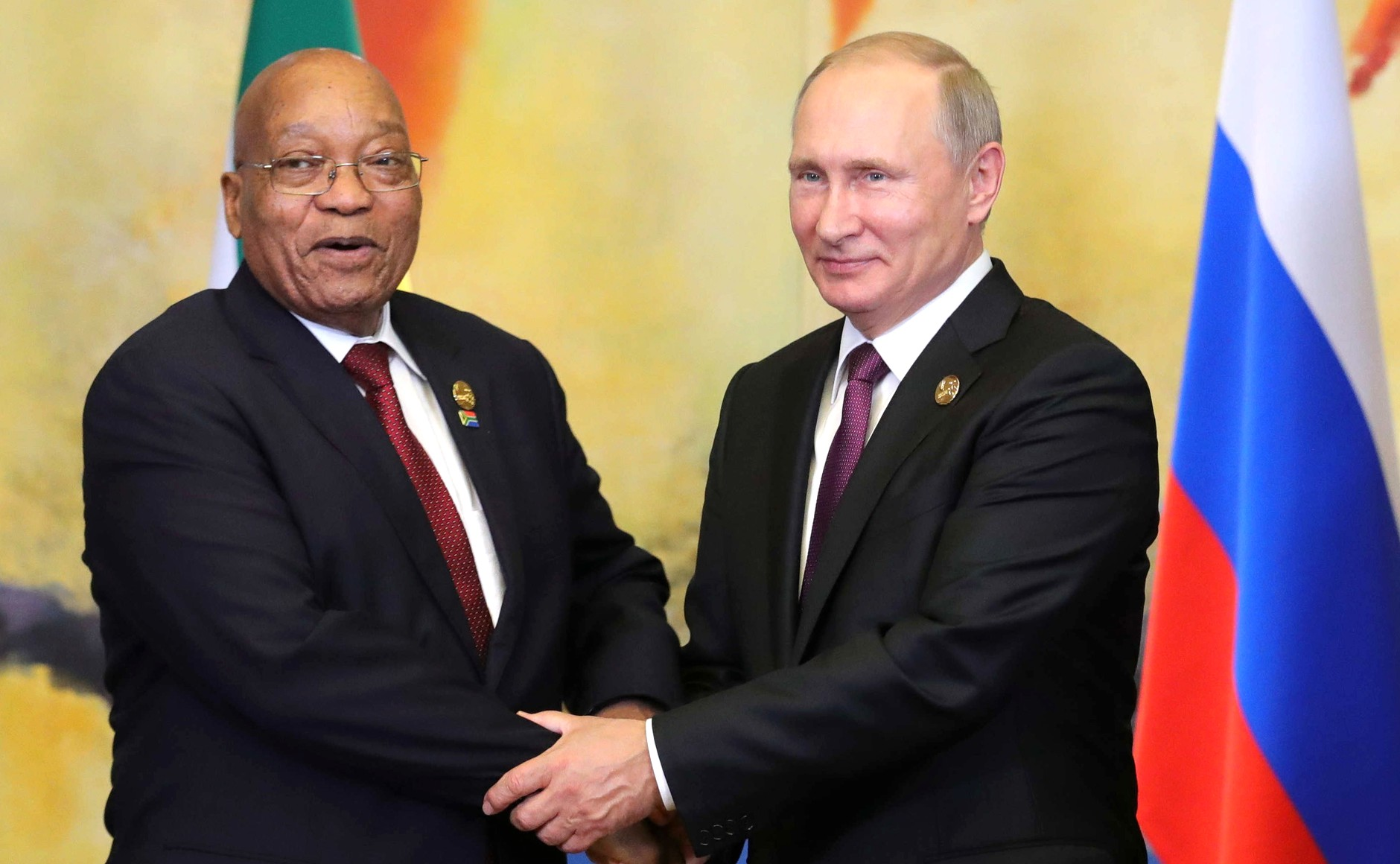
Russian President Vladimir Putin with South African President Jacob Zuma in 2017

In 2014 the Zuma administration and the Russian government put pressure on the South African government to sign a R1 trillion (US$66 billion) nuclear energy deal with the Russian state-owned enterprise Rosatom to build and operate up to eight nuclear power plants in an effort to resolve the South African energy crisis; both the Russian government and the Zuma administration were criticized for forcing through the deal by attempting to circumvent South Africa's procurement laws. The South African Finance Minister Nhlanhla Nene gave testimony to the Zondo Commission that he was fired for not approving a US$100 billion version of the deal in 2015. The deal was cancelled by court order in April 2017.

=== Eskom ===
The state-owned national power utility Eskom has experienced numerous corruption scandals since the start of the South African energy crisis in 2008 and increased in intensity from 2019 onward. These range from outright theft of diesel for backup generators, providing substandard coal for coal-fired power plants, and metal theft to sabotaging energy infrastructure so as to get contracts to do repairs. Corruption, particularly state capture, has also negatively impacted the construction and operation of new power plants, notably Medupi and Kusile.

Then Eskom CEO, André de Ruyter, controversially stated in a public interview that four criminal syndicates had established themselves within Eskom, that corruption was costing the utility a billion Rand a month (roughly equivalent to US$53.9 million), and that a senior ANC MP was involved. De Ruyter went on to say that "load shedding is, to a large extent, attributable to crime and corruption" within Eskom.

In December 2024, global consulting firm Mckinsey was ordered to pay more than $122 million to resolve a U.S. investigation into a scheme in which officials at Eskom and Transnet were given bribes in exchange for non-public information about consulting contracts. According to the U.S. Department of Justice, "McKinsey Africa bribed South African officials in order to obtain lucrative consulting business that generated tens of millions of dollars in profits."

=== The Arms Deal scandal ===
The arms deal, formally known as the Strategic Defence Package, was a multi-billion dollar deal involving arms acquisitions from countries such as Germany and France. This arms deal set a precedent for cases of large-scale corruption and high levels of bribery and embezzlement in the African National Congress. This arms deal came at a time when the AIDS epidemic was rampant throughout Africa and poverty and inequality in the region still remained among the highest in the world. Taxpayers protested the arms deal through a public interest lawsuit claiming that the deal was unconstitutional and irrational. Various South African and international evidence teams have been investigating the arms deal since the early 2000s. Rumors of embezzlement, bribes and kick-backs by and between the external players in this procurement and that of the ANC, have prompted further investigations. In 2011, Former President Zuma appointed a Commission of Enquiry headed by Judge Willie Seriti to investigate allegations of impropriety, fraud and corruption around the 1998 Arms Deal.

As of March 2018, Jacob Zuma has been facing 16 charges of corruption, money laundering, racketeering and fraud involving the 1998 Arms Deal. In total Zuma has been accused of accepting 783 illegal payments, including receiving bribes from a French Arms firm via his financial advisor. In April 2018, two months after resigning from office, Zuma was charged with graft by a national jury. On 11 October 2019, a South African high court upheld all 16 charges against Zuma. A 15-month prison sentence which was issued to Zuma for contempt of court on this case would be reserved by the Constitutional Court of South Africa on 12 July 2021. On 20 July 2021, it was agreed that former South African President Jacob Zuma's criminal trial for this case would begin on either August 10 or August 13, 2021. Prior to his imprisonment, Zuma threatened that his arrest would result in nationwide riots; following his imprisonment in July 2021 triggered large-scale riots and looting in KwaZulu-Natal and Gauteng provinces.

=== Sekunjalo Investments & Iqbal Survé ===
Sekunjalo Investments, a company owned by controversial South African businessman Iqbal Survé, has been involved in a number of scandals and accusations of corruption. These range from the Qatargate corruption scandal at the European Parliament, the alleged bypassing of normal processes by Public Investment Corporation executives to receive public investments and failed repayments on the investments, to allegedly problematic payments to various South African politicians.

=== Other notable corruption scandals ===
==== 1990s ====
"The A.N.C. has established a very clear pattern and the pattern is simple. You can be whatever you like as long as you are loyal. The minister of health may be responsible for 'Sarafina' but she is loyal, so she will be defended. The problem is you can't deal with corruption this way."

— Steve Friedman, Center for Policy Studies (1996)
- The Reverent Allan Boesak was found to have misappropriated donor funds in 1994 intended for his Foundation for Peace and Justice causing significant public controversy. Despite efforts by the ANC government to clear instances of misappropriation Boesak was found guilty of stealing R332,000 in 1999 and convicted.
- In 1995 senior ANC member Winnie Mandela was accused of receiving a US$20,000 bribe from a building contracting company so they could secure government tenders to build public housing.
- Sarafina 2 was a government-funded play based on the musical Sarafina! that was to increase awareness of the South African HIV/AIDS epidemic. In 1996 the ANC and South African government were criticized for not taking action against Health Minister Nkosazana Zuma and other ANC members accused of corruption and misconduct in organising the US$4 million play.
- ANC member and deputy minister of Environment and Tourism, Bantu Holomisa, was expelled from the ANC in 1996 after Holomisa accused former Transkei Prime Minister Stella Sigcau and a number of ANC members of being involved in a corrupt relationship with the South African casino magnate Sol Kerzner.
- Former President Jacob Zuma's financial advisor, Schabir Shaik, was sentenced to 15 years in 2005 for soliciting a bribe from a French arms company Thales in 1999. The bribe was solicited on behalf of Zuma when he was Deputy President of South Africa. Then presidential spokesperson Mac Maharaj was implicated in the bribery scandal when investigated by the Scorpions in 2003.

==== 2000s ====
- New National Party politician Abe Williams was convicted in the year 2000 of corruption involving R240,112 and theft of R383,000 of donor funds intended for the upliftment of impoverished West Coast communities.
- The 2004 Oilgate scandal involved the transfer of R11 million from the state-owned PetroSA to the ANC so as to help fund its re-election campaign in the run-up to the 2004 national elections. The Mail & Guardian newspaper was controversially gagged by the courts from publishing a report on the scandal following the election.
- Tony Yengeni, the ANC's chief parliamentary whip, was found guilty of fraud in 2005 after Yengeni received a large discount on a luxury car from a firm bidding for a government contract. In 2007 Goodwood police station commander, Siphiwu Hewana, was found guilty of attempting to defeat the ends of justice by tampering with the docket for convicted fraudster Tony Yengeni's arrest for driving under the influence.
- In 2005, the Travelgate scandal exposed Members of Parliament who were found to have illegally used parliamentary travel vouchers in a fraud exceeding R37,000,000 for personal use. As the CFO who identified the fraud reported: "I, Harry Charlton FCA, JP can confirm 6 travel agents and 435 then past and present MP's including 3 members of Mbeki's Cabinet were implicated - most of them ANC MPs. 50 plea-bargained for sentences that would allow them to remain as MPs. There were 3 formats of fraud totalling in excess of R37 million (USD12 million). The investigation went back 15 months but there was clear evidence that the fraud had been operating for a longer period. As I would not cooperate my services were terminated by Secretary Dingani in January 2016". Dingani was himself terminated for fraud.
- Former South African President Thabo Mbeki and Sepp Blatter agreed to a $10m deal in 2007, which US prosecutors say was a "bribe" to secure the 2010 World Cup.

==== 2010s ====
- Former National Police Commissioner and ex-President of Interpol, Jackie Selebi, was charged with graft in July 2010, for receiving (at least) R120,000 from alleged crime-syndicate boss, Glenn Agliotti.
- The Vrede Dairy Project was a 2012 government project established to empower black dairy farmers in the town of Vrede for R250 million. The Gupta family and Free State provincial premier Ace Magashule were implicated in the theft of almost all the project's funds.
- The National secretary general of the ANC, Ace Magashule, was suspended from his position and arrested on 21 charges of corruption for his involvement in a 2014 corruption scandal that took place whilst he was Premier of the Free State. The R255 million contract to remove asbestos from public housing in the province was awarded to Blackhead Consulting which in turn made numerous payments to third parties at Magashule's instruction or with his knowledge.
- In 2015 the German offices of the South African-based private company Steinhoff International were raided. This publicly exposed one of the biggest cases of "corporate fraud in South Africa's history" implicating Steinhoff's South African CEO Markus Jooste.
- The collapse of the VBS Mutual Bank in 2018 due to fraud and corruption created a scandal that implicated municipalities, the ANC, and the Economic Freedom Fighters.
- Government contractor Bosasa was found to have been giving senior ANC members bribes to secure lucrative government contracts and avoid investigation. After the scandal was exposed and the company entered voluntary liquidation in 2019 the CEO, Gavin Watson, died in uncertain circumstances. In 2023 two of the companies court-appointed liquidators were shot dead in a suspected assassination that was allegedly connected to their work tracing Bosasa's finances.

==== 2020s ====
- The emergence of a “rogue unit” within the Western Cape Crime Intelligence Division of the South African Police Service (SAPS) resulted in the murder of investigating officer Charl Kinnear in 2020.
- Corruption within the Gauteng Provincial Government Department of Health resulted in the 2021 murder of Babita Deokaran.
- Digital Vibes scandal involving Minister of Health Zweli Mkhize awarding a large COVID-19 communications tender to family members.
- The 2025 Nhlanhla Mkhwanazi whistleblowing scandal involving accusations of high-ranking police officials, politicians and members of the judiciary aiding criminal syndicates and obstructing justice.
- The Independent Development Trust (IDT) CEO's, Tebogo Malaka, kickbacks for tenders corruption scandal and exposed attempts to bribe an investigating journalist to cover up the story in 2025.
- National Police Commissioner Fannie Masemola is suspended and charged with corruption in 2026 for irregularities in the awarding of a medical services contract; making him the fourth permanent head of the South African Police Service to be removed or suspended before completing a term in office.

== Anti-corruption initiatives ==
Government initiatives against corruption are coordinated by the Department of Public Service and Administration. The Public Protector also plays a role in fighting corruption. A disbanded independent anti-corruption unit named the Scorpions was replaced by the Hawks. South Africa's Directorate for Priority Crime Investigation (DPCI), commonly known as the Hawks, was designed to target organized crime, economic crime and corruption. The group was established by the Zuma administration in 2008. South Africa has a well-developed framework and legislation outlining corruption initiatives. The Prevention and Combating of Corruption Act (PCCA) criminalizes corruption in public and private sectors and codifies specific offences making it easier for courts to use the legislation. This act especially condemns bribery, extortion, abuse of power and money laundering while obliging public officials to report corruption offences. Like many corruption regulations in South Africa, the PCCA is poorly implemented and the Act does not include any protection measures for whistle-blowers.

The National Anti-Corruption Forum provides an online guide to the Prevention and Combating of Corruption Act (PCCA). Other acts like the Promotion of Access to Information Act call for increased access to public information. The Public Finance Management Act examines government expenditures and the Code of Conduct for Assembly and Permanent Council members calls for the full disclosure of members to report gifts. Enforcement mechanisms remain weak for many of these preventative Acts, allowing for corrupt actions to go unreported. South Africa has ratified the United Nations Convention against Corruption, the African Union Convention on Preventing and Combating Corruption and the OECD Anti-Bribery Convention.

In 2020, South Africa saw multiple high-profile corruption arrests, including former Mangaung mayor Olly Mlamleli and two senior police officials: Lieutenant-Generals Khomotso Phahlane and Bonang Mgwenya.

Despite these efforts perceptions of the growth of corruption in South Africa continued to increase and deepen in 2023 and 2024 with the country's Corruption Perceptions Index dropping below the global average for the first time.

=== Zondo Commission ===
In 2018 the Zondo Commission of Inquiry was set up to investigate allegations of State Capture and corruption during the administration of President Jacob Zuma. Testimony given during the inquiry implicated Bosasa, Bain & Company, the Gupta family and associates of former President Zuma. During the inquiry hearings, a joint memorandum signed by the embassies of the United States, the United Kingdom, the Netherlands, Germany and Switzerland representing countries that make up 75% of foreign direct investment into South Africa warned that if unaddressed corruption would have a negative impact on future investment in South Africa. It called for President Ramaphosa to act against perpetrators of corruption. The South African government responded that it was disappointed by the memorandum not following "acceptable" diplomatic practices. The Zondo Commission's findings in 2022 exposed widespread corruption, three years later commentators and politicians have questioned the lack of action in implementing the commission's findings to pursuing identified individuals accused of corruption.

== See also ==
- International Anti-Corruption Academy
- Group of States Against Corruption
- International Anti-Corruption Day
- ISO 37001 Anti-bribery management systems
- United Nations Convention against Corruption
- OECD Anti-Bribery Convention
- Judicial Commission of Inquiry into Allegations of State Capture, Corruption and Fraud in the Public Sector including Organs of State
