= Linda Mti =

South African politician

National Commissioner of Correctional Services
- In office 1 September 2001 – 30 November 2006
- President: Thabo Mbeki
- Minister: Ben Skosana; Ngconde Balfour
- Preceded by: Lulamile Mbete
- Succeeded by: Vernie Petersen

Personal details
- Born: Linda Morris Mti; 1954 Port Elizabeth, Cape Province; Union of South Africa
- Party: African National Congress
- Other political affiliations: Umkhonto we Sizwe
- Nickname: Richman

Linda Morris Mti (born 1954) is a retired South African politician and civil servant who is best known for his tenure as National Commissioner of Correctional Services from 2001 to 2006. He currently faces charges of corruption, fraud, and money laundering in connection with contracts illegally awarded to Bosasa during his tenure as commissioner.

Mti was a senior member of Umkhonto we Sizwe during apartheid and he represented the African National Congress (ANC) in the National Assembly from 1994 until 1996, when he was appointed as chief of the National Intelligence Coordinating Committee. He also served on the ANC's National Executive Committee from 1994 to 1997 and is a former Provincial Chairperson of the ANC in the Eastern Cape. After leaving the Department of Correctional Services in late 2006, he served as local head of security for the 2010 FIFA World Cup.

== Early life and activism ==
Mti was born in 1954 in Port Elizabeth in the former Cape Province. He attended the University of Fort Hare and in 1976 began his working life as a laboratory technician in the Cape. He was also active in anti-apartheid politics through the Black Consciousness movement. In 1977, in the aftermath of the Soweto uprising, he was one of many Black Consciousness activists detained by the Security Branch of the police; upon his release, he went into exile in Lesotho, where he joined the African National Congress (ANC).

Until 1985, Mti was stationed with the ANC's operation in Lesotho, where he was a senior member of the Umkhonto we Sizwe command and Regional Politico-Military Council under Chris Hani and Lambert Moloi. From 1985 to 1990, he was a member of the Regional Politico-Military Council in Zimbabwe. He is still known in ANC circles by his nom de guerre, "Richman".

Mti returned to South Africa after the ANC was unbanned by the apartheid government in 1990, and in the early 1990s he served as chairperson of the ANC's branch in the region that became the Eastern Cape.

== Parliament: 1994–1996 ==
In South Africa's first post-apartheid election in 1994, Mti was elected to represent the ANC in the National Assembly, the lower house of the new South African Parliament. He chaired Parliament's Portfolio Committee on Safety and Security. In addition, in December 1994, the ANC's 49th National Conference elected him to a three-year term on the party's National Executive Committee.

== Civil service: 1996–2017 ==
=== National Intelligence Coordinator: 1996–2001 ===
In late 1996, Mti was appointed to succeed Moe Shaik as chief of the National Intelligence Coordinating Committee. The committee was responsible for coordinating the activities of all government agencies with intelligence-gathering functions.

=== Correctional Services Commissioner: 2001–2006 ===
In August 2001, President Thabo Mbeki appointed Mti as National Commissioner of Correctional Services. In July 2004, the Cabinet approved a three-year extension of his contract. In the same month, the Department of Correctional Services, under Mti's leadership, privatised the provision of nutrition services in its prisons, appointing Gavin Watson's Bosasa Operations as a contractor; over the next two years, a number of other large department contracts, cumulatively worth R1.8 billion, were signed with Bosasa.

On 31 March 2006, the Beeld and its sister paper, Die Burger, published front-page stories linking Mti to Bosasa by way of a private company called Lianorah Investment Consultancy (named after Mti's mother), which Mti had registered through Bosasa's company secretary, Tony Perry. Mti denied all allegations of improper conduct or inappropriate ties to Bosasa, but the story led to months of sustained pressure on him, invoking the consternation of Parliament and triggering an investigation by the Public Service Commission. In addition, on 7 November 2006, the South African Police Service reported that Mti had been arrested for drunk driving.

On 9 November, the department announced that Mti had resigned at the beginning of the month and would leave public service at the end of the month. In a statement, it commended him "for the critical role he has played in the transformation of the department from the quagmire of its apartheid legacy to its current status as a leading player in offender corrections and rehabilitation". Investigations into Mti's role in irregularities in the Bosasa contracts continued for over a decade after his resignation.

=== FIFA World Cup security: 2006–2010 ===
The Department of Correctional Services had announced that Mti was leaving the commissioner's office in order to accept a position as local head of security for the 2010 FIFA World Cup, which South Africa was hosting. The local organising committee initially denied this, saying that he was only under consideration for the role; he was, in any case, ultimately appointed. The Mail & Guardian said that he "kept a low profile" while in the position.

=== Nelson Mandela Bay security: 2016–2017 ===
In April 2016, the council of Nelson Mandela Bay Metropolitan Municipality appointed Mti as head of the city's department of safety and security. The Democratic Alliance (DA) reportedly opposed his appointment, on the grounds that he was still under investigation in connection with alleged fraud at the Department of Correctional Services. In addition, he was appointed on the recommendation of Nelson Mandela Bay Mayor Danny Jordaan, but Jordaan was succeeded in August by Athol Trollip, who publicly expressed concern that Mti's appointment had been irregular. In December 2016, the council announced that Mti would take early retirement in May 2017.

== Drunk driving charges ==
Mti has been arrested for drunken driving at least three times, twice during his tenure as Correctional Services Commissioner, and was convicted twice. In 1992, while he was ANC chair in the Eastern Cape, he was convicted in Port Elizabeth of drunk driving and reckless or negligent driving; he paid a R400 fine in lieu of serving two months' imprisonment. He was arrested again in February 2005, outside Port Elizabeth's Boardwalk Casino, after a late-night accident with another vehicle, and again in early November 2006 after an accident in rush-hour traffic in Sandringham, Johannesburg.

In respect of the November 2006 incident, Mti was acquitted of drunk driving and reckless or negligent driving in the Hillbrow Magistrate's Court in June 2008. The state failed to subpoena its main witness (the driver of the other car) or otherwise to prove its case. Irregularities in the prosecutorial procedure led the magistrate to castigate the prosecutors' "incompetent and unprofessional conduct" and led the Mail & Guardian to wonder whether the trial had been "cooked" in Mti's favour; the prosecutors involved were ultimately served written warnings by the National Prosecuting Authority (NPA).

Mti's trial on the February 2005 charge was postponed for some time after the charge was initially withdrawn by prosecutors, and it was not concluded until October 2009, when Mti entered into a plea bargain with the NPA. He pled guilty to drunk driving – having been almost three times over the legal blood alcohol limit – and paid a R20,000 fine in lieu of two months' imprisonment. He was also served a mandatory six-month prison sentence, suspended conditionally for five years, and his driving license was confiscated for six months.

== Corruption charges ==
After Mti resigned from the Department of Correctional Services in November 2006, the Special Investigating Unit (SIU) launched an investigation into the department's contracts with Bosasa. The report of the SIU investigation was finalised in late 2009 and was referred to the NPA for decision on possible prosecutions, but it was not released publicly. In the interim, the Mail & Guardian published a series of further exposés about Mti's relationship with Bosasa, leading Bosasa to complain that it was subjected to "trial by press". Among other things, leaked travel records apparently showed that Bosasa had provided Mti with substantial benefits, including luxury hotel stays and family travel, while he was serving as Correctional Services Commissioner. In March 2011, the SIU's report was leaked to City Press, which reported that the investigation had uncovered evidence of an "improper and corrupt relationship" between Mti (and other officials) and Bosasa; among the specific allegations was the claim that Bosasa had paid for Mti's house.

In February 2019, Mti submitted to arrest and appeared in the Specialised Commercial Crimes Court in Pretoria, alongside others, on charges emanating from the Bosasa contracts. He was granted R20,000 bail. Before the case was heard in court, in March 2022, the Zondo Commission on state capture published its report on government contracts with Bosasa. The commission noted that there were already pending charges against Mti, but the report nonetheless formally recommended that law enforcement agencies should investigate and prosecute Mti for his involvement in the Bosasa contracts. According to the commission, there was strong evidence to suggest that the department's former chief financial officer, Patrick Gillingham, had facilitated the unlawful award of contracts to Bosasa, and that Mti himself had been complicit. The report said:

[Mti's] complicity included providing Gillingham with protection from investigation, discipline and prosecution, at the highest level with the department. Mti facilitated the unlawful awarding of tenders in breach of the Constitution and legislation in order to benefit himself, his family, Bosasa, its associates and the Watson family.

In the criminal case, pre-trial proceedings resumed in the Gauteng High Court in May 2022, but Mti successfully applied for a postponement. Mti is accused alongside Gillingham, another former department executive, and former Bosasa executive Angelo Agrizzi. In the final docket, Mti is charged with one count of corruption, four counts of fraud, five counts of money laundering, and five contraventions of the Public Finance Management Act. The charges arise from four contracts, worth over R1.8 billion, awarded to Bosasa and its subsidiaries from 2004 to 2007.
