= Winnie Ngwenya =

South African politician

Winnie Ngwenya MP

Permanent delegate to the National Council of Provinces from Gauteng
- Incumbent
- Assumed office 23 May 2019

Member of the National Assembly of South Africa
- In office 2005–2014

Personal details
- Born: Winnie Ngwenya Transvaal Province, South Africa
- Party: African National Congress
- Occupation: Member of Parliament
- Profession: Politician

Winnie Ngwenya is a South African politician, African National Congress (ANC) member and a permanent delegate to the National Council of Provinces since 2019. She is a member of the Gauteng provincial delegation in the legislature. Ngwenya served as a Member of the National Assembly from 2005 until 2014.

== Early life ==
Ngwenya was born in the Transvaal Province. She only completed grade 9. She later obtained certificates in management, international relations and leadership skills.

== Political career ==
Ngwenya is a member of the ANC. She was appointed to the National Assembly, the lower house of parliament, in 2005. She served on the correctional services and transport committees. Ngwenya was re-elected to a second term in 2009 and left parliament in 2014. However, she returned to parliament in 2019, as a delegate to the National Council of Provinces, the upper house.

Ngwenya is a PEC member of the ANC in Gauteng and a member of the party's women's league.

== State capture allegations ==
In February 2019, former ANC MP and current COPE spokesperson, Dennis Bloem, said in his testimony at The Judicial Commission of Inquiry into Allegations of State Capture that Ngwenya attempted to recruit him to do tasks for Bosasa. A few weeks earlier, former Bosasa COO Angelo Agrizzi revealed that Ngwenya and other ANC politicians had been receiving bribes of up to R20,000 from the company.

In October 2023, Ngwenya was one of four ANC MPs who were absolved by the Joint Committee on Ethics and Members' Interests of breaching the Code of Ethical Conduct and Disclosure of Members' Interests. The committee cleared her on a technicality, citing that the code was adopted before the allegations against Ngwenya were made.
