= Jabu Moleketi =

South African politician, businessman (born 1957)

Deputy Minister of Finance
- In office 29 April 2004 – 23 September 2008
- President: Thabo Mbeki
- Minister: Trevor Manuel
- Preceded by: Mandisi Mpahlwa
- Succeeded by: Nhlanhla Nene

Member of the Gauteng Executive Council for Finance and Economic Affairs
- In office May 1994 – April 2004
- Premier: Tokyo Sexwale; Mathole Motshekga; Sam Shilowa
- Preceded by: Office established
- Succeeded by: Paul Mashatile

Personal details
- Born: Phillip Jabulani Moleketi; 15 June 1957 (age 69) Pimville, Soweto; Transvaal, South Africa
- Party: African National Congress
- Other political affiliations: South African Communist Party
- Spouse: Geraldine Fraser-Moleketi (m. 1983)
- Education: University of London

Phillip Jabulani Moleketi (born 15 June 1957) is a South African businessman and former politician. A member of the African National Congress (ANC), he was the Deputy Minister of Finance between April 2004 and September 2008. Before that, he was Member of the Executive Council (MEC) for Finance and Economic Affairs in Gauteng Province from May 1994 to April 2004. He was a member of the ANC National Executive Committee between December 1997 and December 2007.

Born in Soweto, Moleketi was an underground operative for the ANC's armed wing, Umkhonto weSizwe, during the anti-apartheid struggle. After the end of apartheid, he was appointed to the Gauteng Executive Council, where he headed the Gauteng Treasury under three consecutive premiers. Though a senior member of the South African Communist Party, Moleketi was reputed for his pro-market economic policies and was an outspoken opponent of so-called ultra-leftism in the party. President Thabo Mbeki promoted him to the National Treasury after the April 2004 general election, and he was viewed as a likely successor to Minister of Finance Trevor Manuel.

After Mbeki was unseated from his leadership positions, Moleketi lost his position in the ANC National Executive and resigned from government in September 2008. In later years he served as chairman of the Development Bank of Southern Africa and in various private-sector positions, including as chairman of Brait, Vodacom, and iOCO. He currently serves as the Chairman of PPC Limited.

== Early life and education ==
Moleketi was born on 15 June 1957 in Pimville, a township in Soweto in present-day Gauteng Province. His father had been a miner and his mother was a domestic worker; neither was literate or politically active, and they lived in a one-room house in Pimville where they raised Moleketi in the Catholic Church. He also had two sisters, one a nurse and the other a social worker. He attended Nchanga High School, a Catholic boarding school in the Valley of a Thousand Hills, but he was expelled in 1973 after he participated in a protest in solidarity with classmates who had themselves been expelled for bringing their girlfriends into the dormitories. Though he had been training to become a priest, Moleketi became disillusioned with the Catholic Church after his expulsion and henceforth abandoned organised religion.

After his expulsion, Moleketi attended Musi High School in Pimville. There he became involved in Black Consciousness politics through the South African Students' Movement (SASM); other members of his SASM branch included Jackie Selebi—a history teacher at the school—and Murphy Morobe and Billy Masetlha. He matriculated in 1975 and wanted to train as a medical doctor but could not attend university without a scholarship. Instead, unemployed, he spent 1976 participating in the Soweto uprising protests.

After the end of apartheid, while serving in government, Moleketi studied financial economics at the University of London, completing a master's degree in 2002.

== Umkhonto weSizwe: 1976–1991 ==
During the Soweto uprising, Moleketi was recruited into the underground African National Congress (ANC) by an activist named Roller Masinga, and in December 1976 he left the country to join the ANC in exile. He received training with the ANC's armed wing, Umkhonto weSizwe (MK), in neighbouring Mozambique, and then returned to South Africa as part of an MK combat unit. Between April 1977 and December 1980, he was an underground MK operative in South Africa, reporting to Siphiwe Nyanda's so-called Transvaal Urban machinery. For cover, Moleketi worked in the Catholic Church as a youth organiser for the Southern African Catholic Bishops' Conference. He lost his right eye in an explosion in an early sabotage operation in June 1977.

After Moleketi's unit's cover was endangered in late 1980, he returned to exile with the ANC. He received military training in Angola, officer training in the Soviet Union over a year in 1982 to 1983, and advanced military training in Cuba in 1989; he also spent time in the Lesotho, Mozambique, Zambia, and, for much of the latter half of the 1980s, Zimbabwe. During this period he was recruited into the South African Communist Party (SACP), and Ivan Pillay recruited him into the ANC's top-secret Operation Vula mission in the final years of apartheid. After the ANC and SACP were unbanned in 1990 during the negotiations to end apartheid, Moleketi returned to South Africa in 1991 as a full-time organiser for the SACP.

== Gauteng Treasury: 1994–2004 ==
After the first post-apartheid elections in April 1994, Moleketi joined the Gauteng Provincial Legislature and Gauteng Executive Council, where he served for a decade as Member of the Executive Council (MEC) for Finance and Economic Affairs. Appointed to that office by the inaugural Premier of Gauteng, Tokyo Sexwale, he continued in the position through the tenure of Premier Mathole Motshekga and the first term of Premier Sam Shilowa.

He was widely respected for his work in the portfolio, described by Africa Confidential as having "a reputation for probity and hard work". The Mail & Guardian said in 1999 that he had built "the finest financial management team – and probably the most racially representative – of any province". His pet initiative was the Blue IQ agency, which ring-fenced a substantial budget for investments in large development projects in Gauteng, including the Gautrain.

=== Tripartite Alliance positions ===
For part of his time in the provincial government, Moleketi served as secretary-general of the SACP's Gauteng branch. He was also repeatedly named as a potential candidate for the provincial leadership of the ANC and the premiership of Gauteng, but the Mail & Guardian observed in 1997 that he lacked a strong constituency in the ANC's local branches. Instead, Moleketi joined the ANC National Executive Committee in December 1997; he was elected to his first five-year term by the ANC's 50th National Conference, ranked as the 57th-most popular member of the 60-member committee by number of votes received. He was re-elected in December 2002, ranked 47th.

=== Political views ===
I do not go home and lock myself in a room and cry because I spoke to Harry Oppenheimer. He is a nice old man, and Anglo American is a key player. I leave the Utopian dreaming to the far left. I am a man of action, I believe that we should have a vision.

— Moleketi on his pragmatic politics in 1995

Moleketi, along with his wife and various other perceived allies of President Thabo Mbeki, was viewed as a member of a contingent of senior "moderates" in the SACP and Tripartite Alliance. A City Press profile described him as believing "that South Africa can only achieve socialism through a capitalist economy".

In a controversial interview in 2001, he castigated the SACP for taking outdated and unsophisticated policy positions and for failing to develop its political role beyond acting as the mere "voice of Cosatu". Moleketi also defended, against charges of neoliberalism, the ANC's prevailing macroeconomic economic policy under President Mbeki, a fiscally conservative and market-oriented programme called Growth, Employment and Redistribution (GEAR); per Moleketi, the experience of the People's Republic of China showed that pro-capitalist policies like privatisation were not necessarily "anti-communist".

In 2002, Moleketi and Josiah Jele co-authored a notorious pamphlet entitled Two Strategies of the National Liberation Movement in the Struggle for the Victory of the National Democratic Revolution, in which they alleged that an "ultra-left plot" inside the Tripartite Alliance was mobilising international support against Mbeki's democratically elected government and its GEAR policy. The pamphlet echoed President Mbeki's denunciation of "ultra-left" opposition as counter-revolutionary, and it inaugurated a public row in the Tripartite Alliance. Critics dismissed its rhetoric for leaning on "the politics of paranoia" and on "McCarthyism, liberal usage of red herrings, and what can only be described as a Qur’anic approach to Marxism–Leninism".

== Deputy Minister of Finance: 2004–2008 ==
In the April 2004 general election, Moleketi left Gauteng to take up an ANC seat in the National Assembly, the lower house of the South African Parliament. Announcing his second-term cabinet on 28 April, President Mbeki named Moleketi as Deputy Minister of Finance. He was expected to be groomed as prospective successor to the Minister of Finance, Trevor Manuel. In his capacity as deputy minister, he served as chairperson of the newly restructured Public Investment Commission (PIC). He also represented the government on the local organising committee that was preparing for the 2010 FIFA World Cup in South Africa; he chaired the technical coordinating committee.

At an early stage in his tenure, in 2005, Moleketi reportedly approached the ANC with a proposal for systematically relaxing South African labour laws in service of the development of a dual labour market. The policy proposal was strenuously opposed by trade unions.

Moleketi served less than a full parliamentary term in national government. At the ANC's next national conference in Polokwane in December 2007, Moleketi was among the several members of Mbeki's government who failed to gain re-election to the ANC National Executive Committee. On 23 September 2008, in response to the announcement that the new ANC leadership had forced Mbeki to resign from the national presidency, he and Manuel both joined the large group of ministers and deputy ministers who announced their own resignations from government.

After Kgalema Motlanthe was announced as Mbeki's successor in the presidency, Manuel's spokesman said that both Manuel and Moleketi were willing to return to their former positions in Motlanthe's government. However, while Manuel returned to the Treasury, Moleketi did not, and he also resigned his seat in the National Assembly on 25 September. Nhlanhla Nene replaced him as Deputy Minister of Finance, and Sicelo Shiceka filled his seat in Parliament. Moleketi was scathing about the Zuma-led ANC's treatment of Mbeki, saying that the party was entering "a man-made winter". He was subsequently courted by the nascent Congress of the People, the group of Mbeki supporters that ultimately broke away from the ANC.

== Career in business ==
Soon after leaving the government, Moleketi launched his career in the private sector. In 2009, the Mail & Guardian reported that he was being considered to succeed Mark Moody-Stuart as chairman of Anglo American. Later that year, he was appointed to the board of Remgro and succeeded Mervyn King as non-executive chairman of the board of asset manager Brait SA. He was appointed to the board of Vodacom in November 2009, and he went on to succeed Peter Moyo as Vodacom's chairman between July 2017 and July 2020, when he ceded the role to Saki Macozoma. In 2018 he was additionally appointed as the chairman of cement maker PPC Limited. In 2020, he was appointed as chairman of the board of technology company iOCO.

Moleketi has also served as chairman or director of three affiliated unlisted investment companies, Harith Fund Managers, Harith General Partners, and Lebashe Investment Group (iOCO's black economic empowerment partner). His interests in these companies became controversial in 2018 when opposition politician Bantu Holomisa wrote to President Cyril Ramaphosa demanding an inquiry into alleged corruption at the PIC, formerly chaired by Moleketi; among other things, Holomisa described Harith and Lebashe as a "cartel" that had improperly acquired PIC funds and profited from the putative conflict of interest that arose from Moleketi's former government offices. Testifying at Lex Mpati's judicial commission of inquiry into the PIC in 2019, Moleketi strongly denied Holomisa's allegations.

Moleketi also remained periodically involved in the governance of public entities. He was the chairman of the state-owned Development Bank of Southern Africa until December 2018. In addition, in 2017, Gauteng Premier David Makhura appointed him as the chairperson of a newly established 14-member provincial economic advisory panel. In May 2026, Carol Paton reported that the ANC had invited Moleketi to return to politics as the party's candidate for Mayor of Johannesburg in the November 2026 local elections; Moleketi declined.

== Personal life ==
Moleketi is married to former cabinet minister Geraldine Fraser-Moleketi. The couple met in exile at an MK camp in Angola and married in Lusaka, Zambia in 1983. They have three children. In 2013 he was robbed at his home in the Johannesburg suburb of Observatory.
