= Dennis Bloem =

South African politician (born 1952)

Delegate to the National Council of Provinces

Assembly Member for the Free State
- In office 7 May 2009 – 21 April 2014

Personal details
- Born: 4 August 1952 (age 73)
- Citizenship: South Africa
- Party: Congress of the People (2009 - 2023); African National Congress (until 2009)

Dennis Victor Bloem (born 4 August 1952) is a South African politician who served as the national spokesperson of the Congress of the People (COPE) until his resignation in August 2023. He represented COPE in the National Council of Provinces from 2009 to 2014 and before that he represented the African National Congress (ANC) in Parliament from 1994 to 2009. A former United Democratic Front activist in the Free State, Bloem defected from the ANC to COPE ahead of the 2009 general election.

== Early life and activism ==
Bloem was born on 4 August 1952. He lived in the Coloured neighbourhood of Brentpark in Kroonstad and was an organiser for the ANC-aligned United Democratic Front (UDF) in the Orange Free State.

In 1992, he and three others were arrested on suspicion of involvement in the murder of George "Diwiti" Ramasimong, the leader of Kroonstad's anti-UDF Three Million Gang. Specifically, Bloem had been seen driving with the killer, UDF member Roland Petrus, to the taxi rank where Ramasimong was killed. During the trial, he denied having prior knowledge of the murder conspiracy; Petrus was convicted and imprisoned for the murder, while Bloem was charged as an accomplice and fined R7,500, which was paid by UDF supporters in the community.

During Truth and Reconciliation Commission hearings in 1996, Petrus applied for amnesty for the murder, claiming that he had been instructed to assassinate Ramasimong after a community meeting had decided that Ramasimong should be killed for orchestrating attacks on UDF supporters. Bloem, by then serving in Parliament, was summoned as a witness. He denied that Petrus had been instructed to carry out the murder, but under cross-examination he admitted that he had perjured himself during the criminal trial: he said that Petrus had told him about his plan while they were driving to the taxi rank and that he had "tried to dissuade" Petrus. He told the Commission that he had lied to the court because "we did not trust South Africa's [apartheid-era] courts and were not free to speak".

== Post-apartheid political career ==
=== ANC: 1994–2009 ===
In the 1994 general election, South Africa's first under universal suffrage, Bloem was elected to represent the ANC in the Senate (soon to become the National Council of Provinces). However, the ANC reshuffled its parliamentary caucuses in 1997 and Bloem was moved to a seat in the National Assembly. He was re-elected to two further full terms in the National Assembly in 1999 and 2004. From 2004 to 2009, he chaired the Portfolio Committee on Correctional Services.

=== COPE: 2009–2023 ===
==== Defection and NCOP: 2009–2014 ====
In March 2009, the Electoral Commission published the draft party lists for the 2009 general election, which showed that Bloem was standing as a candidate both for the ANC and for the Congress of the People (COPE), a newly formed breakaway party. Bloem said that he was not a member of any party other than the ANC and that he was "busy sorting out this whole thing"; a COPE spokesperson said, more directly, that Bloem was indeed standing as a Cope candidate but denying it because he had not yet resigned from the ANC.

Shortly afterwards, Bloem confirmed that he was resigning from the ANC to join COPE. He said, "It was an extremely difficult decision to make. I love the ANC. It is the only political home that I know". However, he said that he felt that provincial party leaders in the Free State ANC did not trust him because of his association with Mosiuoa Lekota, the former ANC national chairperson who had defected to establish COPE. ANC spokesperson Jessie Duarte said Bloem's decision was "politically immoral".

In the general election of that year, Bloem was elected as a Delegate to the National Council of Provinces, representing COPE in the Free State. He and another ANC defector, though they were re-elected to Parliament, were instructed to move out of their four-bedroom parliamentary houses and into two-bedroom units to make room for ANC members, leading to a court battle which ended in an out-of-court settlement.

==== Party offices: 2014–2023 ====
At the end of his five-year term in the NCOP, Bloem stood for re-election to Parliament in the 2014 general election, ranked fourth on COPE's national party list. However, COPE performed very poorly in the election and won only three seats in the National Assembly, meaning that Bloem narrowly failed to gain a seat. In the next general election in 2019, Bloem was ranked 34th on COPE's national party list and again did not gain a parliamentary seat; he was also ranked first on the provincial party list for Gauteng, having stood as COPE's candidate for election as Premier of Gauteng, but COPE did not win any seats in the province.

Though he therefore did not serve in Parliament, Bloem remained active in COPE. In addition, in early 2019, he approached the Zondo Commission and asked to give evidence, emanating from his tenure as the portfolio committee chair, about corruption at the Department of Correctional Services. In his testimony, he was scathing about the ANC's management of the department and said that Linda Mti – the prisoners commissioner who had arranged dubious contracts with Bosasa – had been afforded the protection of top ANC officials, including former Minister Ngconde Balfour.

In 2022, Bloem, as national spokesperson of COPE, was involved in a serious power struggle inside the party. In August of that year, he and COPE deputy president Willie Madisha announced that the party's executive had suspended COPE president Mosiuoa Lekota; Lekota and his allies issued a parallel letter of suspension, claiming that Bloem and Madisha had themselves been suspended by an earlier meeting of the executive.

Bloem resigned from COPE in August 2023, saying that party leader Mosiuoa Lekota had turned the party into a 'laughing stock', and that he no longer wanted to be a part of 'stomach politics'.
