= Portfolio Committee on Correctional Services =

Committee in the National Assembly of South Africa

- Formation: 1994
- Purpose: Oversight of the Department of Correctional Services
- Chairperson: Anthea Ramolobeng (ANC)
- Parent organisation: National Assembly of South Africa

The Portfolio Committee on Correctional Services is a portfolio committee of the National Assembly of South Africa. It is responsible for oversight of the agencies managed by the Minister of Correctional Services, including the Department of Correctional Services.

The committee was established during the first post-apartheid Parliament, with Carl Niehaus as its inaugural chairperson. After the 2014 general election, it was merged into the Portfolio Committee on Justice and Correctional Services, in response to the corresponding ministerial merger that created the Ministry of Justice and Correctional Services. That merger was reversed after the 2024 general election and an independent portfolio committee was re-established.

== List of chairpersons ==
To date, all chairpersons of the committee have been members of the African National Congress (ANC), the national governing party.

=== 2024–present: Correctional Services ===
Session	Chairperson	Party	Election date	Citation
7th Parliament	Anthea Ramolobeng	ANC	9 July 2024	

=== 2014–2024: Justice and Correctional Services ===
Chairpersons of the Committee on Justice and Correctional Services
Session	Chairperson	Party	Election date	Citation
27th Parliament	Gratitude Magwanishe	ANC	2 July 2019	
26th Parliament	Refiloe Mothapo	ANC	9 October 2018	
26th Parliament	Mathole Motshekga	ANC	24 June 2014	

=== 1994–2014: Correctional Services ===
Chairpersons of the Committee on Correctional Services
Session	Chairperson	Party	Election date	Citation
25th Parliament	Vincent Smith	ANC	27 May 2009	
24th Parliament	Dennis Bloem	ANC	25 June 2004	
24th Parliament	Lewele Modisenyane	ANC	11 May 2004	
23rd Parliament	Ntsiki Mashimbye	ANC	7 May 2002	
22nd Parliament	Limpho Hani	ANC	1996	
22nd Parliament	Carl Niehaus	ANC	1994	
