= Lewele Modisenyane =

South African politician

Member of the National Assembly
- In office May 1994 – May 2009
- Constituency: Free State

Personal details
- Citizenship: South Africa
- Party: Congress of the People (since 2009); African National Congress (until 2009)

Lewele John Modisenyane is a South African politician who represented the African National Congress (ANC) in the National Assembly from 1994 to 2009, serving the Free State constituency. He lost his seat in the 2009 general election, in which he defected from the ANC to the opposition Congress of the People (COPE). In 2006, he was convicted of stealing from Parliament during the Travelgate scandal.

== Early life and activism ==
Modisenyane is from the eastern Free State. During apartheid, he was an activist for the United Democratic Front, and after the ANC was unbanned in 1990 he worked as an organiser for the party in the province.

== Legislative career: 1994–2009 ==
In the 1994 general election, South Africa's first under universal suffrage, Modisenyane was elected to an ANC seat in the new National Assembly. He served three terms in his seat, gaining re-election in 1999 and 2004, and represented the Free State constituency. After his re-election in 2004, he served briefly as Chairperson of the Portfolio Committee on Correctional Services: the ANC nominated him to the position in early May but replaced him with Dennis Bloem in a reshuffle in late June.

In January 2006, the Scorpions announced that they intended to pursue criminal charges against Modisenyane as part of the Travelgate scandal; he was one of several politicians accused of defrauding Parliament using false travel benefits claims. In October 2006, he accepted a plea deal and pled guilty in the Cape High Court to one count of theft in relation to the receipt of R45,000 in service benefits. He paid a fine of R25,000, in lieu of serving three years' imprisoned, and was also sentenced to a mandatory five years' imprisonment, suspended conditionally for five years. He and other convicted politicians received a formal reprimand during a parliamentary sitting in March 2007.

Ahead of the 2009 general election, Modisenyane announced that he would leave the ANC to join COPE, a newly formed breakaway party. He was listed 37th on COPE's national party list in the election but did not secure a seat. In February 2010, the Sowetan reported that he was likely to be appointed to manage COPE's parliamentary office.
