= PPC Limited =

South African construction material company

PPC Ltd
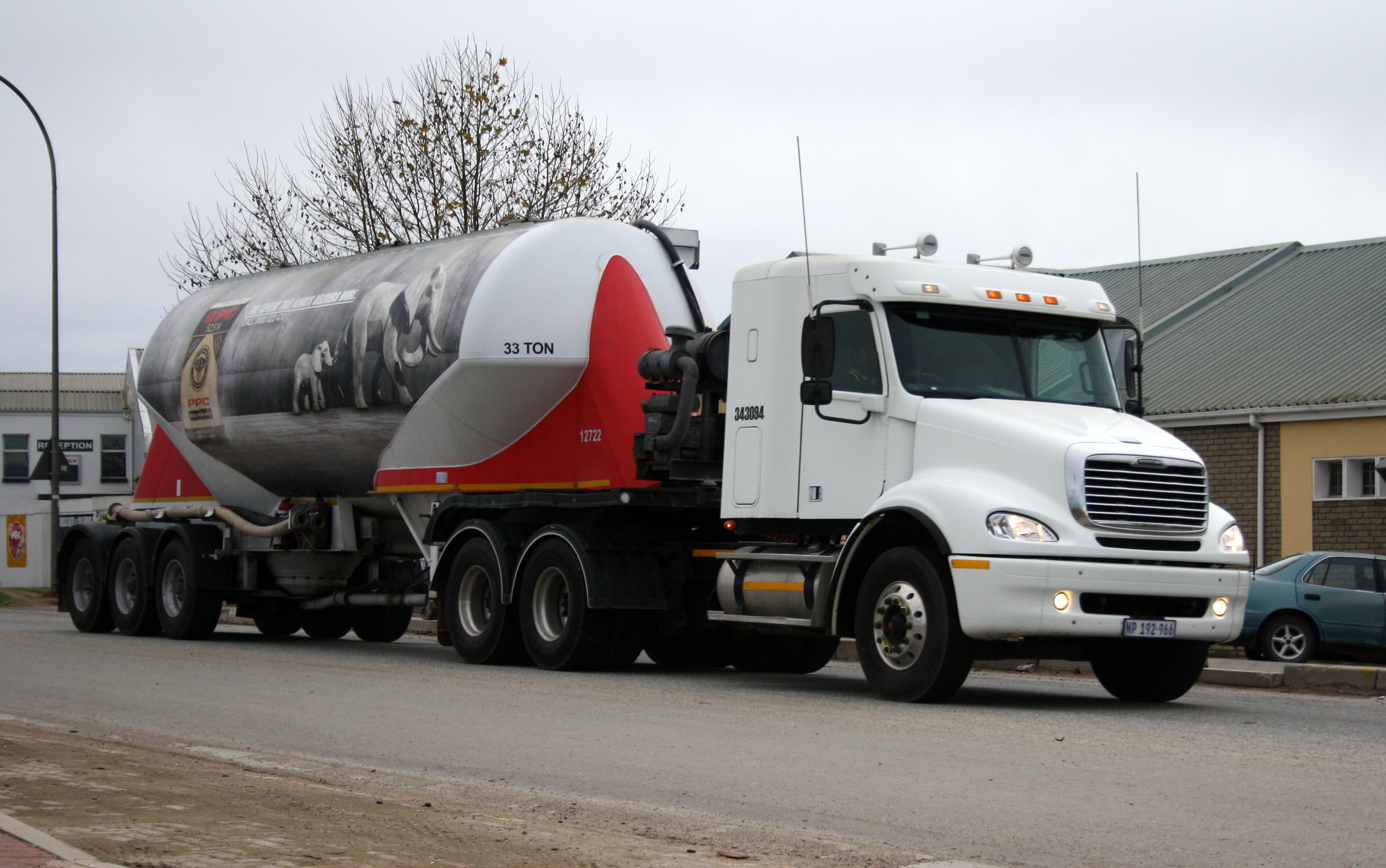
- Type: Public
- Traded as: JSE: PPC
- ISIN: ZAE000170049
- Founded: 1892; 134 years ago
- Headquarters: Johannesburg, South Africa
- Area served: Southern Africa
- Key people: Jabu Moleketi (Chairman); Matias Cardarelli (CEO)
- Products: Cement; Construction aggregate Pre-mix fly ash
- Revenue: ▼ R9.81 billion (2025)
- Operating income: ▲ R817 million (2025)
- Net income: ▼ R466 million (2025)
- Total assets: ▼ R9.01 billion (2025)
- Total equity: ▼ R5.68 billion (2025)
- Number of employees: 3,000 (2025)
- Subsidiaries: PPC Zimbabwe Limited
- Website: ppc.co.za

PPC Ltd is a South African manufacturer of cement, aggregates, ready-mixed concrete, and fly ash. The company is headquartered in Johannesburg, and operates mainly in South Africa, Botswana, and Zimbabwe. Founded in 1892, PPC is one of South Africa's oldest companies.

== History ==
Established in 1892, PPC operated South Africa's first cement plant.

In May 2025, it was reported that German company Heidelberg Materials was considering a bid to wholly acquire PPC. This followed PPC competitor AfriSam receiving a buyout offer from Chinese company West China Cement.

In 2021, PPC's revenue and profitability declined significantly, and the company embarked on a turnaround strategy. In 2024, interim results reported strong performance.

In November 2022, PPC said it had plans to sign a power purchase agreement for wheeled electricity, supplied by an independent power producer, in the coming 6 months.

This was followed up with an announcement in May 2026 that PPC had signed a 24.5 MW solar power agreement with Yellow Door Energy, which would contribute towards PPC's decarbonization goals by removing around 60,000 tons of carbon emissions per year. The project would deliver power to four PPC sites, sourced from YDE's solar facility in the North West province.

In the same month, PPC was approved for a secondary (South African) listing, to trade on the A2X stock exchange.

In August 2025, PPC announced a R3 billion investment in a new integrated cement facility in the Western Cape, which would subsume some of the production done by its Riebeeck site, also in the Western Cape. The new site is intended to have a capacity of 1.5 million tons per year, and promote a more sustainable approach to cement production.

== Operations ==
PPC operates four integrated plants, two grinding stations and three blending plants in South Africa, one integrated plant and two blending plants in Zimbabwe, and one blending plant in Botswana. For its aggregates, PPC has quarries in Laezonia, Mooiplaas, and Centurion.

The company produces around 2 million tons of cement per year, and has a total production capacity of approximately 11.5 million tons per year.
