= Sibongile Sambo =

South African aviation pioneer

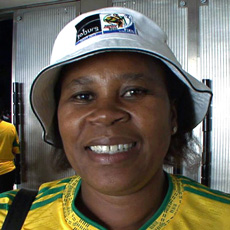
- Sibongile Sambo in Johannesburg, 2010
- Born: 1974 (age 51–52); Bushbuckridge, Mpumalanga, South Africa
- Citizenship: South African
- Education: University of Zululand (Bachelor's degree in Administration)
- Occupations: entrepreneur, motivational speaker
- Known for: Founder and CEO of SRS Aviation; first black female-owned aviation company in South Africa

Sibongile Sambo (born 1974 in Bushbuckridge, Mpumalanga), is a South African entrepreneur and motivational speaker. She is the founder and CEO of SRS Aviation.

== Career ==
She was rejected for a flight attendant position by South African Airways due to not meeting the minimum height requirement. After completing her education at the University of Zululand, She worked with organizations such as Telkom, City Power, and De Beers.

In 2004, buoyed by the opportunities presented by South Africa’s Black Economic Empowerment policies, Sambo founded SRS Aviation. With no prior experience in the aviation sector and limited financial resources, she relied on a modest family loan—secured from her mother and aunt—to purchase her first aircraft.

In February 2020, Sambo testified before the Zondo Commission of Inquiry into state capture in Parktown, Johannesburg, as part of its investigation into South African Airways management.

== SRS Aviation ==
SRS Aviation offers jet and helicopter rental services, air cargo charter, tourist transfers, general air security, medical evacuation and other aero services. SRS Aviation is the first black female owned aviation company in South Africa. SRS Aviation rapidly evolved from a small-scale operation into a comprehensive aviation enterprise. In 2006, following a successful inspection by the South African Civil Aviation Authority, her company was awarded an Air Operating Certificate.

Since it conception in 2004, the company diversified its services to include VIP charter flights, air cargo charters, tourist transfers, medical evacuations, aerial photography, and general aviation security services. By 2010, SRS Aviation had expanded into retail, opening a chain of stores across South Africa’s airport network, thereby solidifying its presence in the industry.

== Achievements ==
Sibongile works as a motivational speaker and mentor. She advocates for gender equality and youth empowerment, using her story to inspire others. She is the first black female to be on the (Commercial Aerospace Manufacturing Association of South Africa) CAMASA board.

In 2006, Sibongile won the BWA’s Regional Businesswomen of the Year award (Start-up category), the BIBA (Black Woman in Business Awards) in London, and the Impumelelo Top Female Entrepreneur award, and she was also a finalist at the Cosmopolitan Movers of the Year in 2007. Sambo was named on the "20 Young Power Women in Africa 2013" list.

== Education ==
She graduated from the University of Zululand where she obtained her Bachelor's degree in Administration. She later furthered her studies in Management and Technology from the same institution. She has Bachelor of Administration Honours and Advanced programme in Organisational Development from Unisa. She holds a Marketing certificate from Institute of Marketing Management. She holds a Mining Executive Preparation Programme from Wits. She also completed an International Executive Development Programme NQF 8 at Gordon Business Schools (Gibs) and Rollins College USA.
