= Duduzane Zuma =

Deputy President of the UMkhonto weSizwe Party

- Born: 20 May 1982 (age 44); Maputo, Mozambique
- Education: Groombridge Primary School, Harare, Zimbabwe; Empangeni High School; University of Pretoria.
- Political party: uMkhonto weSizwe Party (MKP)
- Spouse: Shanice Stork (m. 2015)
- Parent(s): Jacob Zuma; Kate Mantsho (deceased)

Duduzane Zuma is a South African politician currently serving as the Deputy President of the uMkhonto weSizwe Party (MKP), South Africa's third-largest political party in terms of national representation. He does not hold a seat in Parliament. Zuma is the son of the former president of South Africa, Jacob Zuma and twin brother of Duduzile Zuma-Sambudla.

== Biography ==
Zuma came to prominence between 2007 and 2009 when his father became the president of the African National Congress and later the President of South Africa, after which Zuma became the director of a number of South African businesses.

== Controversy ==
In 2014, the Randburg Magistrates Court found that Zuma's negligence had led to the deaths of 30-year-old Phumzile Dube and later Jeanette Mashaba when his Porsche collided with a taxi. The National Prosecuting Authority declined to prosecute. In July 2018, his culpable homicide case was reopened after he arrived back in South Africa for a family funeral. His passport was withdrawn and he has appeared in the Randburg Magistrates Court several times since.

Zuma met further controversy when he joined the companies of his father's best foreign friends, the Gupta family. Lucky Montana suggested that he was involved in the state capture of PRASA with the tender meant to be given to the Chinese; PRASA has taken legal action to recover the stolen money.

In March 2017, he accused Pravin Gordhan of putting pressure on the central bank to close all his bank accounts.

In February 2018, it was reported that Zuma was wanted in connection with the Vrede Dairy Project in the Free State, which allegedly saw politicians and businesspeople fraudulently pocketing millions from the project earmarked for emerging black farmers.

During April 2021 videos came out with him partying on his yacht with a bunch of women wishing happy birthday to a friend named Max, and not adhering to the COVID-19 protocols of Dubai.

After the historic incarceration of his father on Wednesday, 7 July 2021 for contempt of court linked to a refusal to appear before the Zondo Commission of Inquiry, violence and looting broke out across KwaZulu-Natal and Gauteng. Hundreds of supermarkets, shops, warehouses, factories, distribution centers as well as a branch of the South African National Blood Service and other establishments were looted while many buildings were set alight.

By 13 July 2021, the damage was estimated at R2 billion and was still ongoing. In response to allegations of inciting violence through an unverified Twitter account, he appeared in a video, shared on an Instagram page belonging to a friend, Winston Innes, where he stated that he did hold any social media accounts. In the video, he made an appeal to the looters saying "to the people that are protesting and looting, please do so carefully and please do so responsibly."

== Philanthropy ==
In 2017, Zuma pledged to donate his shares of the Oakbay media companies ANN7 and The New Age to the National Youth Development Programme.

== Politics ==
He announced he plans on running for president in the 2024 South African general election as a candidate for the ANC, claiming, "I want to do something different".

Duduzane is a twin with Duduzile Zuma-Sambudla and they were born in Maputo, Mozambique to Jacob Zuma and his late wife Kate Mantsho.

In August 2026, Zuma was appointed as the Deputy President of the uMkhonto weSizwe Party (MKP). He does not hold a seat in Parliament.
