= Vrede =

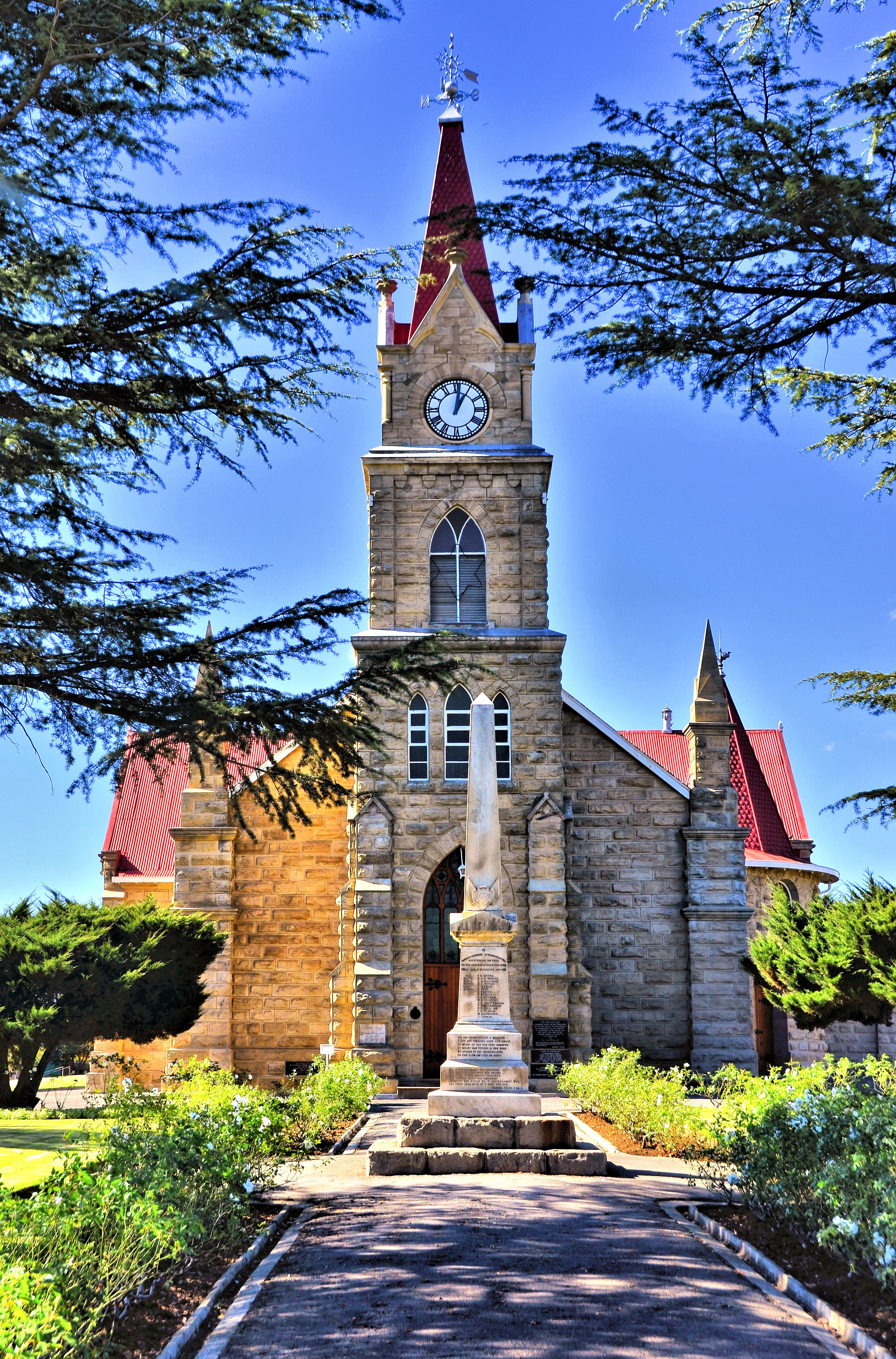
- NG church in Vrede

- Location within Free State (South African province) Location within South Africa
- Coordinates: 27°25′48″S 29°9′36″E
- Country: South Africa
- Province: Free State
- District: Thabo Mofutsanyane
- Municipality: Phumelela
- Established: 1876

Government
  - Councillor: Doreen Wessels (DA)

Area
  - Total: 50.1 km^{2} (19.3 sq mi)
- Elevation: 1,675 m (5,495 ft)

Population (2011)
  - Total: 17,689
  - Density: 353/km^{2} (914/sq mi)

Racial makeup (2011)
  - Black African: 93.1%
  - White: 5.7%
  - Indian/Asian: 0.5%
  - Coloured: 0.4%
  - Other: 0.4%

First languages (2011)
  - Zulu: 53.4%
  - Sotho: 36.5%
  - Afrikaans: 6.0%
  - English: 1.1%
  - Other: 3.1%
- Time zone: UTC+2 (SAST)
- Postal code (street): 9835
- PO box: 9835
- Area code: 058

Vrede is a town in the Free State province of South Africa that is the agricultural hub of a 100 km² region. Maize, wheat, mutton, wool, beef, dairy products and poultry are farmed in the region.

== History ==
Archeological and records conducted by Tim Maggs in 1976 provides evidence of the early Basotho settlement near Ntsoana-tsatsi. The distinctive corbelled house parttens called "N" for Ntsoana-tsatsi dates between 1600 and 1800 AD and was called "Mohlongwa-fatshe.

Before Afrikaaners arrived in the area, it was the Batlokwa's stronghold. In 1863 one J. H. Krynauw bought the farm, aptly named "Krynauwslust" located where the town of Vrede was later proclaimed in 1879. The town celebrated its centenary in 1979.

The town's Afrikaans name "Vrede" can be directly translated to "Peace" in English. This name resulted, due to a bitter feud that raged between the early settlers of the area where the town initially should have been placed. A compromise was reached and peace among the early citizens was achieved, hence the name, "Vrede".

The names Leeukop (Lionshead), Tygerspoort (Tiger's Passage), Kwaggaspoort (Zebra's Passage) still exist today. Unfortunately the folk of the earlier years were not conscious of the ecology and now only names of the game that roamed the area remain. The last known free roaming lion in the area was shot in 1865. In 1858 a sole hippo was spotted in the wetlands surrounding the district of Memel, the neighboring town.

Between 1899 and 1902 many famous battles were fought in and around Vrede and Vrede was also the setting of the stand of the Great Rebellion of 1914 when citizens were called to arms in aid of Britain in the First World War against Germany.

== Controversies ==
A farm outside Vrede was the location of the Vrede Dairy Project corruption incident, where a black-empowerment dairy farm was used as cover for the siphoning of funds to overseas Gupta bank accounts. The incident was a key topic in the investigation into state capture, as covered in the Zondo Commission.

== Notable people ==
- André Brink (1935–2015), novelist, born in Vrede but moving to Lydenburg in childhood
- Sid Kiel (1916–2007), doctor, athlete, and cricketer, born on a Vrede sheep farm but moving to Cape Town in childhood
- Mosebenzi Zwane, former Minister of Mineral Resources
- Bheki Radebe (1965-), Member of the National Assembly (Parliament), born and raised in Vrede. One of the township sections is named after him.
- Ruben Kruger (1970-2010), Springbok Rugby player, who was part of team who won the Rugby World Cup in 1995. His family still farms in the area.
- David Louw (1987-), actor, known for Villa Rosa and Getroud met Rugby.
- Piet van Zyl (1989-), Springbok Rugby player, now Stade Français Paris Rugby, was born in Vrede, but went to Grey College at age 14.
