= Bosasa =

South African company

- Company type: Facilities Management
- Industry: Government contracting
- Founded: 1981
- Defunct: 18 February 2019
- Fate: Voluntary liquidation
- Headquarters: Krugersdorp, Mogale City; Gauteng, South Africa
- Area served: South Africa
- Key people: Gavin Watson (CEO); Angelo Agrizzi (former COO); Joe Gumede (chairperson); Papa Leshabane Sesinyi Seopela Ronnie Watson Jacqueline Leyds Thandi Makoko
- Products: Business services, catering
- Number of employees: 3400
- Website: bosasaydc.com africanglobal.com

Bosasa was a South African company specialising in providing services to government, most notably correctional services. It consisted of Bosasa Group, Bosasa Youth Development Centres, and African Global Operations (formerly Bosasa Operations). The company was liquidated in 2019 after whistleblower Angelo Agrizzi revealed the malfeasance in prolonged scandal about its allegedly corrupt relationship with members of the governing African National Congress (ANC), aired during the Zondo Commission of Inquiry.

== History ==
The company was founded in 1981 as Emafini (Pty) Ltd. After a change of management the company changed its name to Meritum Hostels (Pty) Ltd in 1985 changing its name again to Dyambu Operations (Pty) Ltd in 1996 after signing an agreement with the ANC Women's League controlled Dyambu Trust. Gavin Watson was then made company CEO. The company was renamed Bosasa 2000. Gavin Watson bought Bosasa in the year 2000. Watson was well connected to ANC members such as Linda Mti, who was prisoners commissioner from 2001 to 2006.

In 2017 the company changed the name of its Bosasa Operations division to African Global Operations.

On 18 February 2019, the company announced that it would submit to voluntary liquidation as banks intended to close its accounts by the end of the month. Bosasa said that, due to reputational damage arising from corruption allegations, it was unable to find a financial services provider. Watson died in August 2019 in suspicious circumstances.

== Government contracts ==
Then known as Dyambu Operations, the company started providing services to prisons in 1995 when it established the Bosasa Youth Development Centres, a collection of juvenile detention facilities, in partnership with the Gauteng Department of Social Development. In 2004, the company received its first major government contract when the Department of Correctional Services appointed it to provide catering services to the prison system. The company is estimated to have received government tenders to the value of R12 billion ($918.8 million) between 2003 and 2018. Among other things, it operated the Lindela Repatriation Centre in Krugersdorp since 1996.

== Corruption ==
Bosasa's state contracts had been subject to allegations of impropriety since the mid-2000s, and they were investigated by the Special Investigating Unit between 2006 and 2009. In August 2018, the company's former chief operating officer, Angelo Agrizzi, announced his intention to become a whistleblower and "provide comprehensive details" about "racketeering, corruption and money laundering that I have been aware of over the last 18 years" at Bosasa. Over the next two years, Agrizzi testified at length to the Zondo Commission about Bosasa's relationship with ANC and government officials, which he characterised as deliberately corrupt. His account directly implicated President Jacob Zuma and his associates. Indeed, Agrizzi claimed that Bosasa made monthly payments of R300,000 to Zuma, collected on his behalf by former South African Airways chairperson Dudu Myeni.

Other politicians who allegedly received benefits from Bosasa included Cyril Ramaphosa, who reportedly received a R500,000 donation during his 2017 campaign for president of the ANC; minister Nomvula Mokonyane, who Agrizzi said was paid R50,000 a month for years to protect the company from law enforcement agencies; and minister Gwede Mantashe, who Agrizzi said received security upgrades at his properties. Agrizzi also said that senior prosecutors Nomgcobo Jiba and Lawrence Mrwebi were bribed to protect Bosasa from prosecution.

In addition, News24 reported that Bosasa had donated over R40 million to the ANC since the 1990s and that it was therefore a significant source of revenue for the party. Babalo Madikizela, the treasurer of the Eastern Cape ANC, said the Bosasa scandal will make it more difficult for the ANC to raise funds in the future.

The scandal led to comparisons of Bosasa and its executives to the controversial Gupta family.

In March 2022, the Zondo Commission published its findings about Bosasa's role in state capture and corruption. The commission found that the company "bribed politicians, government officials, President Jacob Zuma and others extensively. Bosasa and its directors and other officials simply had no shame in engaging in acts of corruption". It concluded that "the evidence revealed that corruption was Bosasa’s way of doing business." Agrizzi, Linda Mti, and former MP Vincent Smith were among those indicted on criminal charges relating to bribery by Bosasa.

In March 2023, two of Bosasa's court-appointed liquidators, Cloete and Thomas Murray, were shot dead in a suspected assassination. Freedom Under Law, a legal advocacy organisation, said that the shooting was likely linked to the Murrays' work tracing Bosasa's finances, comparing it with deaths of others investigating corruption such as Charl Kinnear and Babita Deokaran.
