= Tebogo Malaka =

South African public sector executive

- Occupation: Business executive
- Known for: CEO of the Strategic Fuel Fund
- Title: CEO of the Strategic Fuel Fund
- Term: 2024–present

Magogodi Elizabeth Tebogo Malaka is a South African public sector executive who served as Chief Executive Officer (CEO) and Board Chairperson of the Independent Development Trust (IDT), a schedule‑2 state-owned entity responsible for social infrastructure projects in South Africa.

== Education and career ==
Malaka holds a Bachelor of Arts degree from the University of KwaZulu‑Natal. Her early career began in the Department of Social Development as a Programme Manager for Community Development. She later joined the Department of Water Affairs and Forestry, holding multiple roles culminating in a director position from 2006 to 2009. She participated in various boards, including Magalies Water and the North West Development Corporation, and served as a trustee of Mmutla wa Noko Trust. She also held a non-executive director position at Sentech until April 2021. In August 2021, Malaka was appointed board chair of the IDT, and in November 2021 she became acting CEO. Her formal appointment as CEO was finalized in mid-2024.

== Controversies ==
Her leadership at IDT has faced scrutiny due to allegations of procurement irregularities and conflict of interest. A forensic report linked to an R836 million oxygen plant tender uncovered significant issues, and investigations revealed over R33 million in contracts were awarded to a company linked to her sister-in-law. In August 2025, Malaka was suspended following a bribery allegation of R60 000 involving a journalist and amid mounting pressure over her role in previous tender decisions. The IDT board emphasized that the suspension is precautionary, with formal investigations ongoing. The Tebogo Malaka family trust claimed that she wasn't aware of the bribery, while Malaka denies allegation.
