= IOCO =

South African technology company

iOCO Technology Group
- Formerly: Enterprise Outsourcing Holdings (EOH) Group
- Type: Public
- Traded as: JSE: IOC
- Industry: Telecommunications
- Founded: 1998; 28 years ago
- Headquarters: Johannesburg, South Africa
- Area served: EMEA
- Key people: Andrew Mthembu (Chairperson); Rhys Summerton and Dennis Venter (joint CEOs)
- Products: Technology Consulting, IT Services, Systems Integration, Software, Industrial Technologies, Business Process Outsourcing
- Revenue: ▼ R 5.58 billion (2025)
- Operating income: ▲ R 420.96 million (2025)
- Net income: ▲ R 245.93 million (2025)
- Total assets: ▼ R 2.8 billion (2025)
- Total equity: ▲ R 753.31 million (2025)
- Number of employees: ▼4,382 (2025)
- Subsidiaries: List: EOH UK; ALLOS Italy; iOCO Prague; NEXTEC; Sybrin; EOH Switzerland; ASSET Technology Group
- Website: ioco.tech

iOCO, formerly known as EOH Group, is a South African company specialising the provision of technology services to businesses and government. The company was rebranded in December 2024 as part of efforts to distance itself from the scandal around allegations of malpractice and tender irregularities under previous leadership.

== Controversies ==
EOH Group executive, Jehan Mackay, was implicated in a bribery scandal to obtain South African government contracts between 2015 and 2016. In 2020 company representatives gave testimony to the Zondo Commission on its involvement in government corruption and state capture.

In 2017, the company won a tender of almost R300 million to update the Department of Home Affairs's population register system, but as of 2022 no work had been completed. A subsequent investigation by forensic accounting firm Nexia SAB&T revealed that the company beat its competitors in a "corruption infested" bidding process.
