= Independent Development Trust =

South African electricity public utility

- Type: National government agency
- Founded: 1990; 36 years ago
- Headquarters: Glenwood Office Park, Cnr Oberon & Sprite Streets, Faerie Glen, Pretoria, Gauteng, South Africa
- Services: Government infrastructure development management
- Website: idt.org.za

The Independent Development Trust (IDT) is a South African state-owned entity established to manage and deliver cost-effective infrastructure and development programmes on behalf of the South African government. It was established in 1990 with a government grant of R2 billion with the aim of supporting "education, housing, health services and business development projects in previously disadvantaged and mainly rural areas."

Since 1999 until 2025 it has reportedly delivered around R27.4 billion worth in development programs.

In 2025 the organisation was embroiled in scandal when the Daily Maverick exposed corruption involving the IDT's CEO, Tebogo Malaka, and a resulting attempt by the CEO's office to bribe the investigating journalist to not publish the story. This resulted in the Minister of public works and infrastructure, Dean Macpherson, to initiate an investigation.
