= Murder of Charl Kinnear =

2020 murder in Cape Town, South Africa

- Date: 18 September 2020
- Time: 15:03 SAST
- Venue: Outside the home of the victim
- Location: Bishop Lavis, Cape Town, South Africa; 33°56′46″S 18°35′23″E
- Cause: Shooting
- Motive: Assassination of a police officer investigating state corruption
- Deaths: 1
- Suspects: 1. Zane Killian; 2. Amaal Jantjies; 3. Janick Adonis; 4. Nafiz Modack

The murder of Charl Kinnear occurred at around 15:03 SAST on 18 September 2020 as he was arriving at his home in Bishop Lavis, Cape Town, South Africa. He was shot multiple times in the upper body whilst seated in the driver's seat of his white Toyota Corolla resulting in his death. Kinnear was a lieutenant colonel in the South African Police Service (SAPS) and was a detective and section commander for the Western Cape anti-gang unit Team C. Former semi-pro rugby player Zane Killian was arrested shortly after the incident and charged with Kinnear's murder. Kinnear's mobile phone had been illegally tracked 2,116 times by Killian before his murder using a specialised mobile phone tracking software that was accessible through a web browser on his phone or a computer.

At the time of his death Kinnear was investigating a gun racketeering case involving the alleged organised crime boss Nafiz Modack and 8 high-ranking police officers. The Independent Police Investigative Directorate (IPID) reported that Kinnear's death could result in the collapse of a number of high-profile organised crime cases that he was investigating. The same report stated that there was a “rogue unit” in the Western Cape Crime Intelligence Division of SAPS and commended Kinnear's investigation of corruption within the organisation.

Modack and two additional suspects (Amaal Jantjies and Janick Adonis) were arrested and charged for Kinnear's murder in 2021. Recordings made by Jantjies indicated that a prior unsuccessful attempt on Kinnear's life had been made when a hand grenade failed to detonate in front of Kinnear's home on 23 November 2019. Following the first attempt a police detail was instructed to guard Kinnear's home but was removed on 19 December 2019.

As of January 2022 the IPID had lodged two criminal charges against National Police Commissioner Khehla Sitole for refusing to cooperate with its investigation into Kinnear's murder.

In April 2022 one suspect, Fareez Smith (a self confessed member of the Junky Funky Kids street gang), pleaded guilty of attempting to assassinate Kinnear at his home in November 2019. Smith's attempted assassination of Kinnear failed when the grenade he was given to implement the assassination with fell out of his pocket in view of police officers stationed outside Kinnear's home. Smith was convicted of attempted murder, illegal possession of explosives, and contravening the Prevention of Organised Crime Act.
