= Gavin Watson =

South African businessman and Bosasa CEO

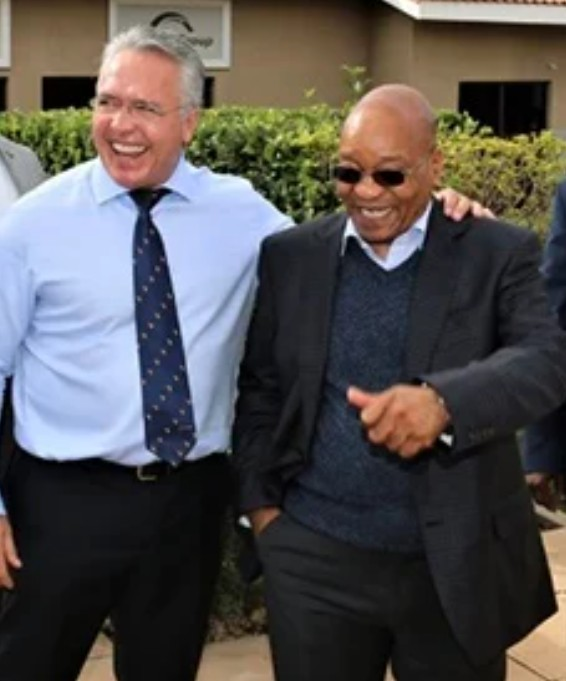
- Watson and former President Zuma
- Born: 12 July 1948; Somerset East, Cape Province, Union of South Africa
- Died: 26 August 2019 (aged 71); Johannesburg, Gauteng, South Africa
- Occupation: Businessman
- Children: 2
- Relatives: Cheeky Watson (brother), Luke Watson (nephew)

Gavin Joseph Watson (12 July 1948 – 26 August 2019) was a South African businessman who was Chief Executive Officer of African Global Operations, previously known as Bosasa, from 2000 until his death in 2019. His company was implicated in state capture during judicial hearings in January 2019.

== Early life and family ==
Watson and his brothers grew up on a farm near Somerset East, in the Eastern Cape province of South Africa where his father was a lay preacher who preached racial equality during apartheid. Noted South African rugby player Cheeky Watson is Gavin's younger brother. The Watson family was known for defying apartheid laws on racial segregation by playing in mixed race rugby games in the 1970s. During this time Watson befriended and made many connections with African National Congress (ANC) members who would go on to serve in the post-apartheid government of South Africa.

== Bosasa ==
In the mid-1990s following the end of apartheid, Watson's company Bosasa began providing services to state prisons. It received its first large contract from government in 2004 when the Department of Correctional Services awarded it a contract to provide catering services to the prison system. The company is estimated to have received government tenders to the value of R12 billion (US$918.8 million) between 2003 and 2018.

Bosasa was described as an ally of the ANC and donated about R3,000,000 to the ANC's 2014 election campaign. Watson also made a personal donation of about R500,000 to Cyril Ramaphosa's successful campaign to become president of the ANC.

In January 2019, former Bosasa Chief Operating Officer (COO), Angelo Agrizzi, while testifying at the State Capture Inquiry, implicated Watson and many senior government officials in serious allegations of corruption and money laundering.

== Death ==
Watson died in a car accident early on 26 August 2019 when the company Toyota Corolla he was driving struck a pillar on an approach road leading to O. R. Tambo International Airport in Johannesburg. His BMW X5 was in for mechanical repairs at the time.

Bosasa employee and former Chief Operating Officer, Angelo Agrizzi, said that he was saddened to hear about Watson's death. Agrizzi hinted at the possibility that Watson wanted to leave South Africa. The governing African National Congress described him as an "anti-apartheid activist", while the official opposition Democratic Alliance called for a transparent investigation into his death. The police have opened a culpable homicide case. A memorial service for Watson was held on 30 August 2019 in Roodepoort, Gauteng. Watson's funeral service was held on 3 September 2019 at the Feather Market Hall in Port Elizabeth, Eastern Cape. Former President Jacob Zuma delivered the eulogy and hinted at the possibility of an assassination plot.

A private pathology report, requested by the family, later found that Gavin Watson had been deceased at the time of the accident. Speculation of foul play remains, though current reports do not rule out natural causes. Facts that arose as a result continue to raise speculation as to the nature of and circumstances surrounding his death.
