= Vrede Dairy Project =

South African dairy project

The Vrede Dairy Project is a South African dairy project established in 2012 on Krynaauwslust Farm, near the town of Vrede (Thabo Mofutsanyana District Municipality), Free State Province. The dairy was established as a public-private partnership with Estina, a Black Economic Empowerment company, as part of the Free State provincial government's agricultural project, Mohoma-Mobung. Estina was given the land under a free 99 year lease.

The aim of the R250m dairy project was to empower black farmers, but bank statements show that no payments were made to black beneficiaries. The dairy farm was just a shell through which money was sent to India.

On 14 January 2022, the Premier of the Free State Sisi Ntombela handed over the project to 65 local farmers for management and implementation, with oversight from a trust and executive team.

== Allegations of corruption ==
In mid-2013, investigative journalism published in the Mail & Guardian newspaper alleged corruption, violations of Treasury rules and mismanagement and linked the project to the Gupta family and allies of President Jacob Zuma. Newspaper reports alleged that R30 million in government funds intended for the project were instead laundered through Dubai, paid for the 2013 wedding ceremony of Vega Gupta at Sun City and accounted for as a business expense. In January 2018, City Press claimed that only 1% of the R220 million allocated to the dairy by the Free State government was spent on actual farming, with most of it being diverted to associates of the Guptas. Bank statements showed that the Free State government paid R334 million to the farm over two years, with the project being transferred most of the money to its bank accounts in India and only small amounts spent on the farm itself.

In January 2018, the Asset Forfeiture Unit of the National Prosecuting Authority took control of the farm in a move against state capture and seized R220 million that Free State Department of Agriculture under Mosebenzi Zwane had paid to the Gupta family, calling it a "scheme designed to defraud and steal monies from the department". The Hawks unit of South Africa's Directorate for Priority Crime Investigation (DPCI) raided the offices of Ace Magashule, the Premier of the Free State, in connection with the project. Charges were laid against two state officials and a number of associates of the Gupta family. However, the National Prosecuting Authority provisionally dropped the charges in November 2018 by citing lack of co-operation from authorities in India and the United Arab Emirates.

In October 2018, one of the whistleblowers over corruption allegations in the project was found and murdered.

In October 2019, former Free State MEC for Finance Elzabe Rockman testified at The Judicial Commission of Inquiry into Allegations of State Capture in relation to the provincial treasury's role in the project. Rockman claimed that she had met the Guptas multiple times and said that the project should have been put through an open tender process, as it was unknown to the department as to why Estina had been chosen.

=== Public Protector report ===
In February 2018, Public Protector Busisiwe Mkhwebane released a report finding irregularities, gross negligence and maladministration and recommending for Magashule to institute disciplinary action against implicated officials. The Public Protector did not investigate alleged links between the project and the Gupta family. It claimed financial and resource constraints, which resulted in Mkhwebane being summoned to appear before the Parliamentary Portfolio Committee on Justice and Correctional Services to explain those comments. The report was criticised by the opposition Democratic Alliance as a whitewash of corruption, and by the South African Federation of Trade Unions for exonerating the main political figures responsible for the scandal (Magashule, Mosebenzi Zwane and the Guptas) and for making a scapegoat of minor players. The Democratic Alliance and the Council for the Advancement of the South African Constitution (Casac) successfully applied to have Mkhwebane's report on the project declared unconstitutional and set aside, with the Gauteng High Court finding that the Public Protector had failed in her duties to investigate the Vrede Dairy Project. The Public Protector's office was ordered to pay the costs of the challenge, with some of the costs awarded against Mkhwebane personally.

Mkhwebane's impartiality was called into question in 2020 after Mosebenzi Zwane, who was then under investigation by The Public Protector's office, attended Mkhwebane's 50th birthday party with another person accused of corruption, Bongani Bongo.

=== Parliament Ad Hoc Committee 2026 ===
In February 2026, Patricia Morgan-Mashale, a South African whistleblower and former administrative clerk for the South African Police Service (SAPS) in the Free State, testified at the parliamentary ad hoc committee public hearings where she implicated senior police officers and politicians in the province for their alleged cover-up of serious crimes.

Mashile made allegations relating to the murder of witnesses linked to the Vrede Dairy Farm case and also made mention of a convicted prisoner and self-confessed hitman, Zwelinzima Nquru, who told her that certain police officers and former premier, Ace Magashule were involved in these crimes. Mashale further alleged that anti-fraud investigator and employee of the Mangaung Metro Municipality in the Free State, Ms. Seipati Lechoano, was killed in 2018 by the same hitman who murdered a witness in the Vrede dairy farm case; her body was later found in the boot of her car on Christmas eve.
