= Public Finance Management Act, 1999 =

Law in South Africa

Parliament of South Africa
- Long title: To regulate financial management in the national government and provincial governments; to ensure that all revenue, expenditure, assets and liabilities of those governments are managed efficiently and effectively; to provide for the responsibilities of persons entrusted with financial management in those governments; and to provide for matters connected therewith.
- Citation: Act No. 1 of 1999
- Territorial extent: Republic of South Africa
- Enacted by: Parliament of South Africa
- Assented to: 2 March 1999
- Commenced: 1 April 2000
- Status: In force

The Public Finance Management Act, 1999 (PFMA; Act No. 1 of 1999) is the primary public finance management law in South Africa. It delineates standards for expenditure, accounting, and reporting for public entities. Its scope is generally limited to entities of national and provincial governments. A piece of framework legislation, its implementation is governed by regulations and directives produced by the National Treasury.

The act was drafted by the first post-apartheid government to modernise public finance management standards and comply with Section 216 of the Constitution of 1996. It replaced and superseded various pieces of apartheid-era legislation subsidiary to the Exchequer Act, 1975. In particular, the new public finance management framework was viewed as a necessary complement to the service-delivery focus of the Reconstruction and Development Programme, given that previous legislation focused on expenditure control to the detriment of reporting and accounting on the basis of non-financial service-delivery outputs. The act has been viewed as inspired by the New Public Management paradigm.

Since its commencement in April 2000, the PFMA has been amended several times, notably by the Public Finance Management Amendment Act, No. 29 of 1999.

== Purpose ==
The objects of the act are:

- to regulate financial management in the national government;
- to ensure that all revenue, expenditure, assets and liabilities of that government are managed efficiently and effectively;
- to provide for the responsibilities of persons entrusted with financial management in that government; and
- to provide for matters connected therewith.
