= Zondo Commission =

2018 South African corruption investigation

The Judicial Commission of Inquiry into Allegations of State Capture
- Date: 21 August 2018 – 15 June 2022
- Location: Johannesburg, South Africa
- Also known as: Zondo Commission
- Budget: R 1 billion (equivalent to ~US$66 million)
- Participants: Raymond Zondo (chairperson)
- Website: www.statecapture.org.za

The Judicial Commission of Inquiry into Allegations of State Capture, Corruption and Fraud in the Public Sector including Organs of State, better known as the Zondo Commission or State Capture Commission, was a public inquiry established in January 2018 by former President Jacob Zuma to investigate allegations of state capture, corruption, and fraud in the public sector in South Africa.

By December 2020, the commission had interviewed 278 witnesses and collected 159,109 pages and one exabyte of data as evidence. It received eight extensions to finish its report, with 15 June 2022 being the end of its mandate. The first part of the report was published on 4 January 2022. The fifth and final part was published on 22 June 2022. It cost the state close to R1 billion (US$ 66 million), far more than any prior South African judicial inquiry.

The reports provide strong evidence of state capture and detailed insight into how state capture was organised and facilitated by some leaders in both the public and private sectors.

== Background ==
In 2016, the Public Protector, Thuli Madonsela, launched an investigation into state capture after receiving formal complaints from Stanislaus Muyebe of the Dominican Order of Southern Africa, another member of the public, and leader of the opposition Mmusi Maimane. In November 2016, the publication of the report of her investigation, titled State of Capture, caused a major scandal. The report implicated Zuma and other state officials in improper relationships with the Gupta family, among other improprieties, and recommended that Zuma should appoint a commission of inquiry into state capture. Zuma sought to have Madonsela's findings overturned in the High Court, but the court dismissed his application, finding that the Public Protector's recommendation was binding and that Zuma had to appoint a commission of inquiry within 30 days. At the instruction of the court, it was Chief Justice Mogoeng Mogoeng who selected the chairperson of the inquiry, Deputy Chief Justice Raymond Zondo. Zondo is assisted by several other full-time officials, including former Auditor-General Terence Nombembe at the head of the investigations team, and Frank Dutton, who served as lead investigator until his death in January 2022.

The commission was established in January 2018 but did not hold its first hearing until August 2018, by which time Zuma had resigned and been replaced by President Cyril Ramaphosa. Following a series of extensions, it concluded its hearings in August 2021 with testimony from Ramaphosa. However, on 29 September, the Pretoria High Court granted the commission another three-month extension, which expired at the end of December 2021. Minister of Justice and Correctional Services Ronald Lamola – whose portfolio is responsible for financing the commission – lodged, and then withdrew, a legal challenge to the application for an extension. Another extension was granted to the commission on 28 December, giving it until 28 February 2022 to hand over the report to Ramaphosa.

The first part of the report was handed over to Ramaphosa on 4 January 2022. The second part was handed over on 1 February. On 23 February, the Pretoria High Court extended the deadline to 30 April. The commission delivered the third part of its findings on 1 March. An eighth extension was granted by the court on 28 April, extending the deadline to 15 June. The fourth tranche was handed over on 29 April. The commission however failed to meet the deadline for handing over the final part of the report. The fifth and final tranche was handed over on 22 June.

== Areas of interest ==
=== Terms of reference ===
The commission was appointed under terms of reference which were flexible but which singled out for investigation several issues, primarily arising from the State of Capture report and of varying degrees of specificity. Thus the commission was to investigate whether:

- attempts had been made through inducements to influence members of the national executive or other state functionaries, including whether the Gupta family had offered cabinet positions to politicians Vytjie Mentor and Mcebisi Jonas;
- the appointment of members of the national executive and office bearers had been disclosed to the Gupta family or other unauthorised persons prior to the appointments being formally made or announced;
- the national executive or state functionaries had facilitated the unlawful awarding of tenders by state entities to benefit the Gupta family or any other individuals or corporate entities;
- there had been corruption in the awarding of contracts and tenders by the 21 major state-owned entities listed in Schedule 2 of the Public Finance Management Act;
- there had been irregularities, undue enrichment, corruption, or undue influence in the awarding of contracts, mining licenses, government advertising in the New Age newspaper, and any other governmental services to the Gupta family;
- any member of the national executive had improperly intervened in the matter of the closing of banking facilities for Gupta-owned companies;
- any advisers in the Ministry of Finance had been appointed without proper procedures, including whether Minister Des van Rooyen's two senior advisers had been appointed improperly;
- there had been corruption in the awarding of contracts and tenders by government, and of what nature and extent; and
- in particular, whether the national executive or state functionaries had influenced the awarding of tenders to benefit themselves, their families, or entities in which they held a personal interest.

If irregularities were found, the Commission was also to investigate the extent to which the national executive – including Zuma and the deputy ministers – had been responsible for them.

=== Hearings ===
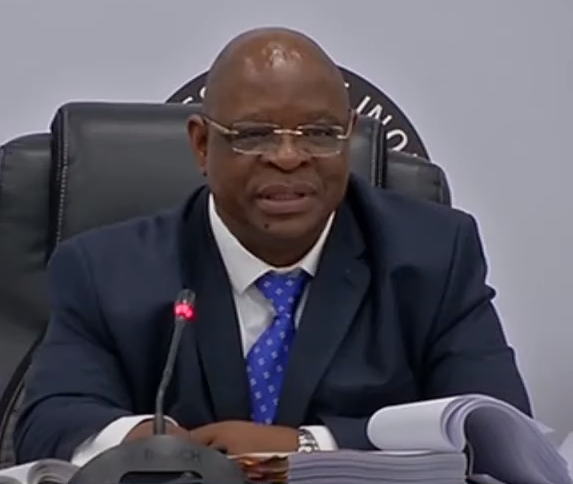
Deputy Chief Justice Raymond Zondo heading the Judicial Commission of Inquiry into Allegations of State Capture on 17 May 2019 as it was streamed live on TV.

Most testimony given to the inquiry focused on corruption and maladministration at state institutions during Zuma's administration (2009–2018). Over 300 witnesses testified, with revelations including allegations about:

- State capture by the Gupta brothers, including, through their media enterprises, contracts that companies associated with the brothers received from state-owned companies, and controversy over an Air Force Base Waterkloof incident;
- Corruption and maladministration at the Vrede Dairy Project;
- Issues relating to lobbying to protect the pay-TV monopoly of MultiChoice;
- Payment of kickbacks to secure government contracts by EOH Group;
- The role of McKinsey & Company in facilitating large-scale corruption by the Gupta brothers;
- The role of Bain & Company in helping to systematically de-capacitate the South African Revenue Service; and
- Harassment and persecution faced by whistleblowers who helped expose corruption.

During hearings on these sagas, the commission has heard extensive testimony about maladministration and/or corruption at state-owned enterprises and state institutions including:

- The state-owned rail monopoly Transnet;
- National energy utility Eskom;
- The state-owned defence conglomerate Denel;
- The South African Broadcasting Corporation;
- The state-owned airline South African Airways;
- Law enforcement agencies, including the South African Police Service and the National Prosecuting Authority;
- The South African Revenue Service;
- The State Security Agency; and
- The City of Johannesburg municipality.

==== Allegations against Zuma ====
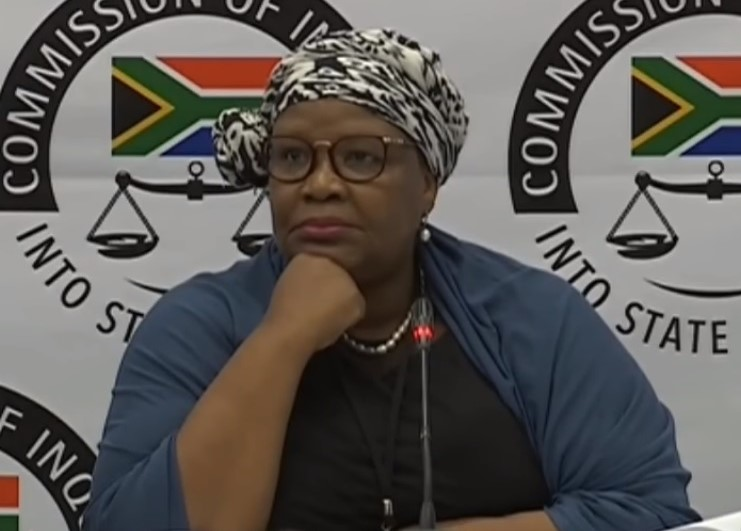
Vytjie Mentor giving testimony to the commission.

Several witnesses – according to the commission, more than 40 by February 2021 – personally implicated Zuma in misconduct. For example:

- Vytjie Mentor testified that in 2010, while Zuma was in a nearby room, the Gupta family had offered to make her Minister of Public Enterprises if she cancelled the South African Airways route to India, to the benefit of Jet Airways and Etihad Airways;
- Themba Maseko, former head of Government Communications and Information Systems, testified that in 2010 Zuma had asked him to "help" the Gupta family, including by placing government advertisements in the Gupta-owned New Age;
- Former Minister of Finance Nhlanhla Nene testified that in 2015, Zuma had scolded him for not having finalised a R1.6-trillion nuclear deal with Russia, which Nene thought exorbitantly expensive and which was ultimately approved by cabinet the same night that Nene was fired;
- Former Minister of Public Enterprises Barbara Hogan testified that Zuma had attempted to interfere in the appointment of chief executives at Transnet and Eskom, attempting to install Siyabonga Gama and Jacob Maroga respectively;
- Angelo Agrizzi, former Bosasa chief of operations, testified that the Bosasa chief executive Gavin Watson paid monthly R300,000 bribes to Zuma, and that Watson had hoped to lobby Zuma to hire a new director at the National Prosecuting Authority ahead of investigations into Bosasa; and
- Former ANN7 editor Rajesh Sundaram testified that Zuma – as well as his son Duduzane Zuma, who had a financial interest in the Gupta-owned ANN7 – was closely involved in ANN7 strategy and hoped to set ANN7 apart from eNCA, which he felt portrayed him and the government negatively.

== Notable testimony ==
Many individuals have been summoned to testify before the Commission, including former president Jacob Zuma and other current and former government ministers and officials, as well as various business executives. Those required to testify include Ben Ngubane, Mosebenzi Zwane, Barbara Hogan, Mcebisi Jonas, Des van Rooyen, Nomvula Mokonyane, Vytjie Mentor, Pravin Gordhan, Sibongile Sambo, Job Mokgoro and Angelo Agrizzi, among many others.

=== State Security Agency ===
Testimony given by multiple members of the South African State Security Agency (SSA) made national headlines for the amount of state funds used irregularly, breadth of controversial clandestine activities, and overt support the agency gave to president Zuma during his presidency. The acting director-general of the SSA, Loyiso Jafta, testified that it was highly a politicised agency following its formation in 2009 and that was used to improperly fund and support a number of African National Congress (ANC) political activities. This confirmed previous testimony given by the Former Chairperson of the High-Level Panel of Review into the SSA, Sydney Mufamadi. Jafta stated that at least R9 billion (roughly equivalent to US$758.7 million) of the SAA's fixed assets were "not to be found and that R125-million could not be accounted for in the 2017/18 financial year." Prior to Jafta's testimony the Minister of State Security Ayanda Dlodlo sought to muzzle Jafta arguing that it would endanger state security.

Testimony given to the commission regarding the improper activities of the SSA state that:

- The news wire service, African News Agency, was given R20 million in 2015/16 as part of a state campaign to action a "media project aimed at 'countering negative local and international perceptions of the country, Zuma and the SSA'".
- Then president Jacob Zuma was personally and improperly given millions of Rands in cash from the SSA budget on a monthly basis between 2015 and 2017.
- SSA resources and intelligence were used to fight political battles within the ANC. This includes fighting against President Ramaphosa's 2017 ANC presidential campaign to replace Zuma.
- SSA resources were used to enhance the electoral fortunes of the ANC.
- The SSA was used to spy on and neutralise civil society actives such as the Right2Know campaign, Zuma Must Fall and Fees Must Fall movements.
- SSA resources were used to prevent investigations into state corruption and improper activities within the SSA.

=== Angelo Agrizzi ===
Bosasa COO Angelo Agrizzi made national headlines when he testified to the commission that the company systematically gave substantial bribes to South African government officials to ensure that the company received government contracts and was not investigated. Agrizzi's testimony implicated then President Zuma, notable government minister Nomvula Mokonyane, chairperson of South African Airways Dudu Myeni, and ANC politician Gwede Mantashe.

=== Nomvula Mokonyane ===
Former minister of Water and Sanitation, Nomvula Mokonyane, was implicated in a number of allegations of corruption during the commission. This included testimony by Agrizzi that Mokonyane was paid R50,000 (around US$3,500) a month for years to protect Bosasa from law enforcement agencies and that she received numerous 'gifts' from Bosasa such as expensive vehicles. Mokonyane's testimony before the commission was notable for its contradictory statements, the serious nature of the allegations made against her, and the high profile it received in the media.

=== Dudu Myeni ===
Dudu Myeni, a close associate of president Zuma, was implicated in illegal activities when she was chairperson of South African Airways. When Myeni appeared before the commission on 5 November 2020 she repeatedly revealed the identity of a secret state witness, in violation of the terms set by the Commission. The witness had received anonymity as the commission had reason to believe that the witness's life would be at risk if their identity was made public. This resulted in Judge Zondo requesting that criminal charges be placed on Myeni.

=== Athol Williams ===
Former Bain & Company partner, Athol Williams, testified for two days presenting evidence of the alliance between Bain & Company, Jacob Zuma, Tom Moyane and others to plan the restructuring of numerous state institutions. His testimony provided evidence of the premeditated plans to restructure South African Revenue Service which led to its near collapse. In November 2021, Williams published Deep Collusion: Bain and the capture of South Africa which is based on his testimony.

=== Jacob Zuma ===
==== Testimony ====
From 16 July 2019, Zuma testified before the Zondo Commission about his role in state capture and corruption activities. On the first day of his testimony he claimed that there was a foreign-backed conspiracy against him and that some of those testifying against him were apartheid-era spies. Zuma accused the Zondo Commission of being a tool to end his political career. Zuma admitted to having a friendly relationship with the Gupta brothers, but denied engaging in any corrupt activities. Following the first day of Zuma's testimony, the Democratic Alliance accused Zuma of trying to play the victim and misleading the commission.

During Zuma's second day of testimony, he claimed that he was the target of a suicide bombing assassination attempt, the South African Police Service later stated that they were unaware of any such event taking place. Zuma controversially accused senior ANC member Ngoako Ramatlhodi of being a spy involved in a conspiracy against him. During the third day of Zuma's testimony he accused the commission of being biased against him and threatened to withdraw his cooperation. On the fourth day, Zuma's legal team announced that it would be withdrawing from the commission, but later the same day announced that he had changed his mind and would return to give additional testimony at a later date.

==== Contempt of court ====
Following Zuma's testimony to the commission, South African media speculated that the chances of Zuma being later charged and convicted for crimes committed during his administration or for giving false testimony to the commission had increased. On 11 October 2019, a South African high court denied Zuma a motion to strike down 16 criminal charges of fraud, racketeering and money laundering related to an illegal $2.5bn (£1.98bn) arms deal which allegedly was undertaken in the late 1990s in order to ensure that South Africa's armed forces could buy 30bn rand of European military hardware.

Zuma's legal team attempted to get Judge Zondo to recuse himself from the commission accusing Zondo of bias and having a supposed prior friendship with Zuma. Judge Zondo rejected the recusal request.

A little over 16 months after Zuma first appeared before the commission criminal charges were laid against him for walking out of the commission without permission and refusing to give testimony. This was preceded by a long period in which Zuma tried to avoid appearing before the commission through legal moves and arguments in the alleged hope that the commission would conclude before he would have to appear before it. This approach was dubbed as Zuma's Stalingrad defence strategy. In December 2020, Judge Zondo ordered Zuma to testify before the commission regarding Zuma's involvement with the Guptas business deals. Judge Zondo's order was taken to the Constitutional Court which ruled that Zuma had to answer questions before the commission and ordered Zuma to pay the commission’s legal costs.

Zuma defied the Constitutional Court and refused to testify to the Zondo Commission on 4 February 2021. The commission, whose mandate ends on 31 March, asked the court for an urgent order directing him to give evidence. A judge later requested that a contempt of court charge be filed against Zuma. On 25 March 2021, the Constitutional Court upheld a previously ruling which found that Zuma's refusal to testify before the Commission classified as contempt of court. On 29 June the Constitutional Court handed down a 15 month prison sentence to Zuma. Shortly after Zuma's imprisonment on 7 July large scale unrest and looting broke out in the provinces of KwaZulu-Natal and Gauteng, lasting from 9 to 17 July 2021.

== Findings ==
The Report comprises findings 6 volumes, each volume with multiple parts, and each part focusing on a specific genre of state capture and related findings. While there has been some follow-up on certain of the recommendations by the executive and/or other parties, much remains to be done.

Commission Findings
Volume	# of Parts	Subjects
1	1	Introduction, SAA, SAAT and SA Express
2	2	Transnet, Denel
3	4	BOSASA
4	4	Treasury, EOH, Alexkor, Free State, Eskom
5	2	SAA, Crime Intelligence, SABC, Waterkloof, PRASA
6	4	Estina, President, Parliament, Cadre deployment, Optimum Coal, Flow of funds, Recommendations

Initially the findings were to be released in three parts but this number was later increased. Each of the multiple parts of the report's findings were divided into multiple volumes. An extension was requested so that the commission would have additional time to deliver its findings; this pushed the deadline for releasing all of its findings out to 15 June 2022. The commission found that multiple incidents of state capture took place within South African government departments and state-owned enterprises during the presidency of Jacob Zuma as senior officials routinely broke law.

=== Part 1 ===
Part 1 was released on Tuesday 4 January 2022. It has three volumes with the first volume focused on corruption within the state owned South African Airways, the second on findings relating to the Gupta family, and the third on the South African Revenue Service and recommendations to reform the government procurement system. Part 1 of the Zondo Commission report found the following:

==== South African Airways ====
Part 1 made the following findings regarding South African Airways (SAA):

- The appointment Dudu Myeni as chairperson of SAA by then President Zuma had caused “sustainable damage” to the company.
- Despite public controversy over Myeni's actions as chairperson all attempts to remove her were resisted "at the highest level" of government.
- Myeni had "a sustained disdain for the authority and processes of the commission”.
- Resources that Myeni "unlawfully received from [the] State Security Agency" revealed "how close she was to President Zuma".
- Yakhe Kwinana, during her time as a board member between 2009 and 2016, caused "sustained damage" to the financial position of SAA and seemingly lacked "knowledge and appreciation" of her duties as a chartered accountant.
- PricewaterhouseCoopers effectively enabled capture of SAA by failing to adequately audit its financial and accounting processes between 2012 and 2016.

The report recommended that:

- Myeni be charged with corruption and fraud.
- Kwinana be investigated by the South African Institute of Chartered Accountants.

==== South African Revenue Service ====
Part 1 made the following notable findings regarding the South African Revenue Service (SARS):

- Moyane and Zuma played a critically important role in "capturing" the SARS and that Moyane was appointed by then President Zuma as SARS commissioner to facilitate this.
- SARS was targeted as its powers to investigate organised crime was seen as a threat to the state capture project.
- Zuma, Moyane and Bain & Company worked together to facilitate the take over of SARS.

The report recommended that:

- All state contracts with Bain & Company be reviewed.
- Moyane be charged with perjury for lying and providing false information to parliament.

==== Gupta family ====
Part 1 made the following notable findings regarding the Gupta family enterprises and activities:

- The awarding of government tenders and state owned enterprise advertising contracts to the Gupta owned New Age Newspapers defied both "logic and legal requirements."
- Then Minister for Public Enterprises, Malusi Gigaba, was “prepared to do wrong for the Guptas or Mr Zuma”.

The report recommended that:

- Brian Molefe and Collin Matjila facilitated Gupta corruption within Transnet and SAA respectively; and that they should face criminal charges.

==== African National Congress ====
Part 1 found that the ANC:

- Benefited from the extensive corruption of state enterprises, including SARS and SAA. This alleged corruption also benefited Zuma and his political allies.
- Exhibited an apparent lack of concern regarding the decline of state entities, and an unwillingness or inability to rectify these institutions.

=== Part 2: Transnet ===
Part 2 was published on 1 February 2022 and announced findings on corruption and maladministration within the state-owned companies Denel, Eskom and Transnet. The following notable findings were made:

- Jacob Zuma sought to have Siyabonga Gama appointed as CEO and thus served as a "willing enabler" of corrupt practices at Transnet.
- Soon after Gama and Brian Molefe were appointed to executive positions in 2011, the SOE saw the "first significant locomotive transaction tainted by corruption".
- Three main corrupt deals to procure 1,259 locomotives with China South Rail, China North Rail, General Electric, and Bombardier Transportation.

The report recommended that:

- Brian Molefe, Anoj Singh and Siyabonga Gama should be prosecuted for facilitating the corrupt procurement of train locomotives.
- Jacob Zuma should face charges of "corruption and racketeering" stemming from his instrumental role.

=== Part 3: Bosasa ===
Part 3 was published on 1 March 2022 and focused on findings relating to corruption relating to the privately owned state contractor BOSASA. Following the release of part 3 the commission's findings were criticized by allies of Jacob Zuma. Part 3 made the following notable findings and recommendations regarding government's interactions with state service provider BOSASA:

- Senior ANC politician Gwede Mantashe should be probed for corruption for receiving kickbacks from BOSASA.
- Dudu Myeni received bribes and helped halt a BOSASA corruption probe.

=== Part 4 ===
Part 4 of the commission's findings was divided into four volumes and published on the morning of 29 April 2022. The fourth part of the findings focused on the attempted capture of the National Treasury, corruption between the private technology service provider EOH and the City of Johannesburg, corruption within state owned diamond mining company Alexkor, the Free State asbestos removal and public housing project, and the capture of the state electrical utility Eskom. The fourth part of the commissions report made the following notable findings:

- The R1.2 billion Free State Housing project to construct 200,000 houses was a "dismal failure" due to government mismanagement.
- The 2015 firing of Nhlanhla Nene as finance minister confirmed that President Jacob Zuma was a puppet of the Gupta brothers and that it was "almost a miracle" that the national Treasury was not captured by Gupta interests.
- Zuma had been "determined", over several years, to grant control of the National Treasury to the Gupta family.
- "Certain Gupta-linked individuals or entities were irregularly or corruptly awarded certain contracts at Alexkor"

The report recommends that:

- Tony (Rajesh) Gupta be prosecuted for corruption.
- Mosebenzi Zwane, Moses Mpho Mokoena and other individuals involved in the Free State housing project should be investigated and potentially charged with fraud.
- Former Eskom executives Brian Molefe, Anoj Singh and Matshela Koko be criminally investigated for improperly awarding contracts to McKinsey & Company and Trillian Capital Partners.
- Alexkor executives be investigated for corrupt links to the Gupta family and their companies.
- Ramaphosa should "consider" Zizi Kodwa's position as Deputy Minister of State Security due to his links with allegedly corrupt individuals at EOH.

== Impact ==
Researchers at North-West University Business School found that while the Zondo Commission successfully exposed corruption and made valuable recommendations, its impact has been limited by a lack of prosecutorial power and insufficient political will for implementation. By 2025 a number of commentators and political parties had questioned the lack of action in implementing the commission's findings and pursuing identified individuals accused of corruption.

== See also ==
- Crony capitalism
- Madlanga Commission
- Salim Essa

== Links to findings ==
Part 1 findings

- Judicial Commission of Inquiry into State Capture Report: Part 1 Vol. 1: South African Airways (4 January 2022)

Part 2 findings

- Judicial Commission of Inquiry into State Capture Report: Part 2: Denel & Transnet (2 February 2022)
- Judicial Commission of Inquiry into State Capture Report: Part 2 Vol. 1: Transnet (2 February 2022)
- Judicial Commission of Inquiry into State Capture Report: Part 2 Vol. 2: Denel (2 February 2022)

Part 3 findings

- Judicial Commission of Inquiry into State Capture Report: Part 3 Vol. 1: BOSASA (1 March 2022)
- Judicial Commission of Inquiry into State Capture Report: Part 3 Vol. 2: BOSASA (1 March 2022)
- Judicial Commission of Inquiry into State Capture Report: Part 3 Vol. 3: BOSASA (1 March 2022)
- Judicial Commission of Inquiry into State Capture Report: Part 3 Vol. 4: BOSASA (1 March 2022)

Part 4 findings

- Judicial Commission of Inquiry into State Capture Report: Part 4 Vol. 1: Attempted Capture of National Treasury (29 April 2022)
- Judicial Commission of Inquiry into State Capture Report: Part 4 Vol. 2: Attempted Capture of National Treasury (29 April 2022)
- Judicial Commission of Inquiry into State Capture Report: Part 4 Vol. 3: Attempted Capture of National Treasury (29 April 2022)
- Judicial Commission of Inquiry into State Capture Report: Part 4 Vol. 4: Attempted Capture of National Treasury (29 April 2022)

== External references ==
=== Books ===
- Zondo At Your Fingertips (2023). Holden, Paul. Jacana Media Pty (Ltd), South Africa. ISBN 9781431433261

=== External links ===
- Final Reports - Commission of Inquiry into state capture
- Website of the Commission of Inquiry
- TimesLive coverage of the commission
- Eyewitness News coverage of the commission
- Daily Maverick coverage of the commission
- News24 coverage of the commission
- Betrayal of the Promise Report.
- ‘No Room To Hide: A President Caught in the Act’ Report
- OUTA’s State Capture Portfolio
