= Angelo Agrizzi =

South African businessman and whistleblower

Angelo Agrizzi is a South African convicted criminal and former chief operating officer of Bosasa, a South African logistics company, until 2016. He is best known for his testimony to the Zondo Commission, during which he blew the whistle on the corrupt relationship between Bosasa and members of the South African government and governing African National Congress (ANC).

His testimony followed a press statement released on the night of 21 August 2018, in which Agrizzi said that he had decided to "provide comprehensive details" about "racketeering, corruption and money laundering that I have been aware of over the last 18 years" at Bosasa.

In November 2025, Agrizzi entered into a plea agreement with the State, admitting to charges of corruption and money-laundering linked to the company’s controversial contracts with the Department of Correctional Services. Agrizzi received a 10-year sentence for each count of corruption and an additional 10 years for money laundering—but the sentences were wholly suspended for five years, as he is sick.

Agrizzi grew up in Germiston in the former Transvaal. His family immigrated to South Africa from Italy. In October 2026, Agrizzi was ordered to pay 1.66 billion to the state by the Gauteng High Court.
