= Department of Correctional Services (South Africa) =

Department of the South African government

- Logo of the department

Department overview
- Formed: 1990
- Jurisdiction: Government of South Africa
- Employees: 38,459 (2018/19)
- Annual budget: R26,800.0 million (2020/21)
- Ministers responsible: Pieter Groenewald, Minister of Correctional Services; Lindiwe Ntshalintshali, Deputy Minister of Correctional Services
- Department executive: Makgothi Samuel Thobakgale, Acting Commissioner: Correctional Services
- Website: www.dcs.gov.za

The Department of Correctional Services is a department of the South African government. It is responsible for running South Africa's prison system. The department has about 34,000 staff and is responsible for the administration of 240 prisons, which accommodates about 189,748 inmates. The prisons include minimum, medium and maximum security facilities. The agency is headquartered in the west block of the Poyntons Building in Pretoria's central business district.

The political head of the department is the Minister of Justice and Correctional Services, who is supported by a Deputy Minister of Correctional Services. As of June 2024 the minister is Pieter Groenewald and the deputy minister is Lindiwe Ntshalintshali. In the 2020 budget, R26,800.0 million was appropriated for the department. In the 2018/19 financial year the department had 38,459 employees.

== Correctional centres ==
The 178 prisons run by the department include:

- 9 women-only prisons
- 13 prisons for young offenders
- 40 prisons for male offenders
- 72 prisons for both male and female offenders
- 5 prisons that are temporarily closed down or undergoing renovations

== Notable prisons ==
- Pollsmoor Prison in the Western Cape Province is the largest maximum security prison and houses inmates serving life or long term sentences.
- C Max in Pretoria is also a maximum security prison which houses inmates serving long sentences and those that are considered flight risks.
- The former Pretoria Central Prison now known as Kgosi Mampuru II (who was hanged at the prison on 22 November 1883 for public violence and revolt, as well as the murder of rival leader Sekhukhune), was the official site for capital punishment in South Africa before the end of apartheid, frequently meted out against opponents of the apartheid regime. Capital punishment was abolished in 1995 (see Capital punishment in South Africa)
- Drakenstein Correctional Centre, the prison from which Nelson Mandela was released after being imprisoned for opposing apartheid.

== Branches ==
- Finance
- Development and Care
- Corrections
- Central Services
- Corporate Services
- Operations & Management Support
- Departmental Investigation Unit (DIU)
- Community Corrections

== Awards ==
=== Decorations ===
- Department of Correctional Services Star for Excellence (SPE)
- Department of Correctional Services Cross for Valour (Diamond) (CPV)
- Department of Correctional Services Cross for Valour (Ruby) (CPF)
- Department of Correctional Services Star for Distinction (SPO)
- Department of Correctional Services Star for Merit (SPM)
- Department of Correctional Services Cross for Merit (CPM)
- Department of Correctional Services Medal for Merit (Officers)
- Department of Correctional Services Medal for Merit (Non-Commissioned Officers)

=== Long service medals ===
- Department of Correctional Services Medal for Faithful Service (Gold)
- Department of Correctional Services Medal for Faithful Service (Silver)
- Department of Correctional Services Medal for Faithful Service (Bronze)
