= Athol Williams =

South African philosopher and poet

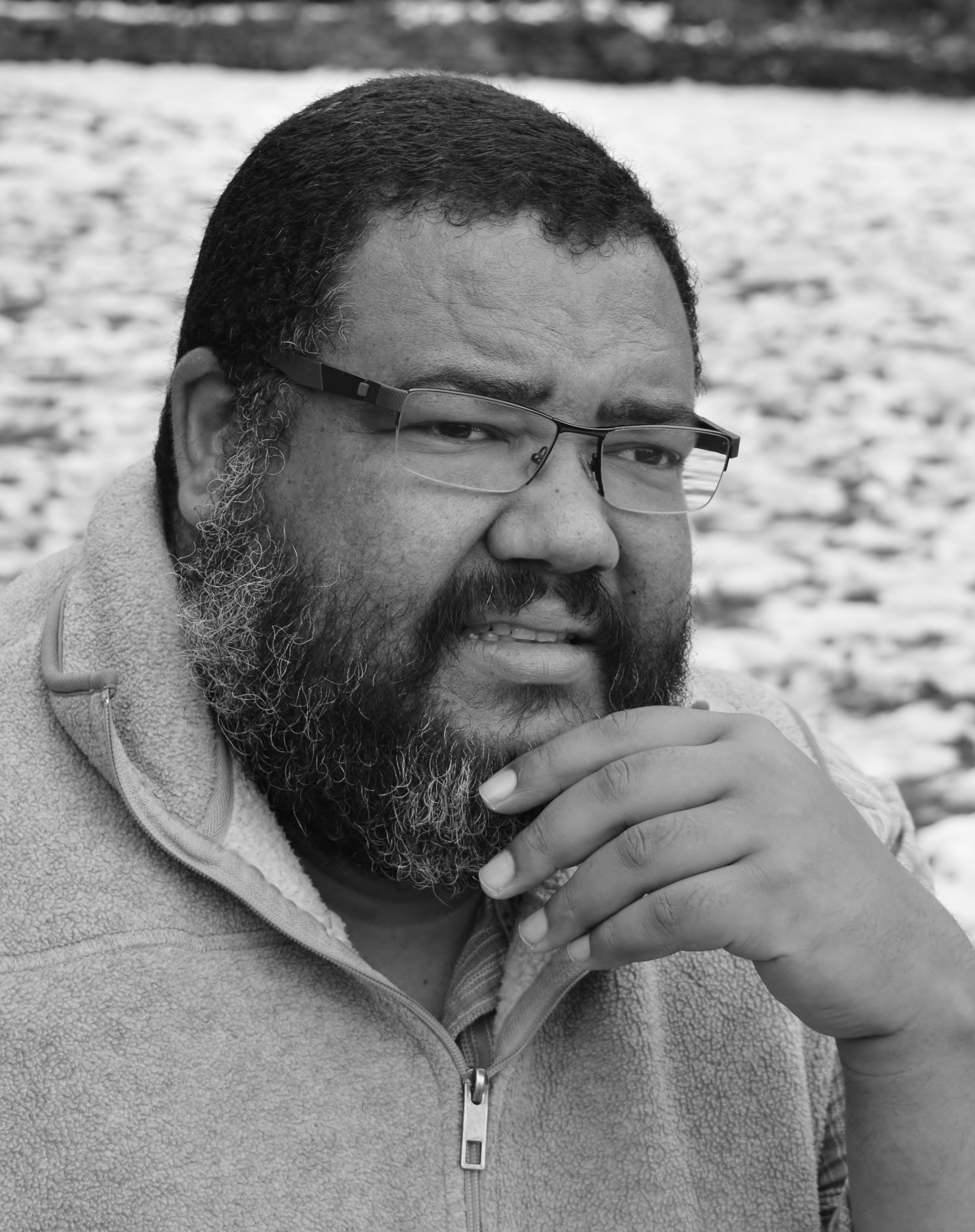
- Athol Williams in Oxford, UK, 2017
- Born: Athol Williams; Cape Town, South Africa
- Education: Oxford University; London School of Economics; Harvard University; London Business School; Massachusetts Institute of Technology; University of the Witwatersrand
- Occupations: Writer, Applied Philosopher
- Writing career
- Language: English
- Website: www.atholwilliams.com

Athol Williams is a South African poet, applied philosopher and business professor based at Oxford University. In 2026, Williams was appointed Poet Laureate at Oxford University's Saïd Business School.

== Life ==
Williams was born in Lansdowne, Cape Town, South Africa, and grew up in Mitchells Plain, the coloured township established under apartheid. Before becoming an academic and writer, he worked in business for fifteen years, mainly as a strategy advisor. He is founder of the Cape Flats Book Festival. On Freedom Day in 2025, a mural of Athol Williams was unveiled in Cape Town, measuring 10m x 8m, celebrating him as a 'South African Hero' and 'Education Champion.'

== Anti-corruption ==
In October 2019, Williams blew the whistle on Bain & Company stating that they had withheld relevant information from the Nugent Commission investigating irregularities at South African Revenue Service. In December 2019, several media outlets reported that Bain had attempted to buy Williams's silence. In March 2021, Williams testified for two days before the State Capture Commission presenting evidence relating to Bain's alliance with Jacob Zuma and Tom Moyane in alleged state capture in South Africa. The Commission's final report concluded that Bain's behaviour was 'unlawful' and praised Williams for rejecting hush money and acknowledged his contribution, stating 'it particularly wishes to express its appreciation to Mr Williams for the evidence he gathered and placed before the Commission.' In November 2021, Williams published Deep Collusion: Bain and the capture of South Africa based on his testimony and experience at Bain.

On 1 November 2021, Williams fled South Africa due to safety concerns. As a witness and whistle-blower who implicated dozens of individuals in the ongoing Zondo Commission, he feared possible reprisal.

== Academia ==
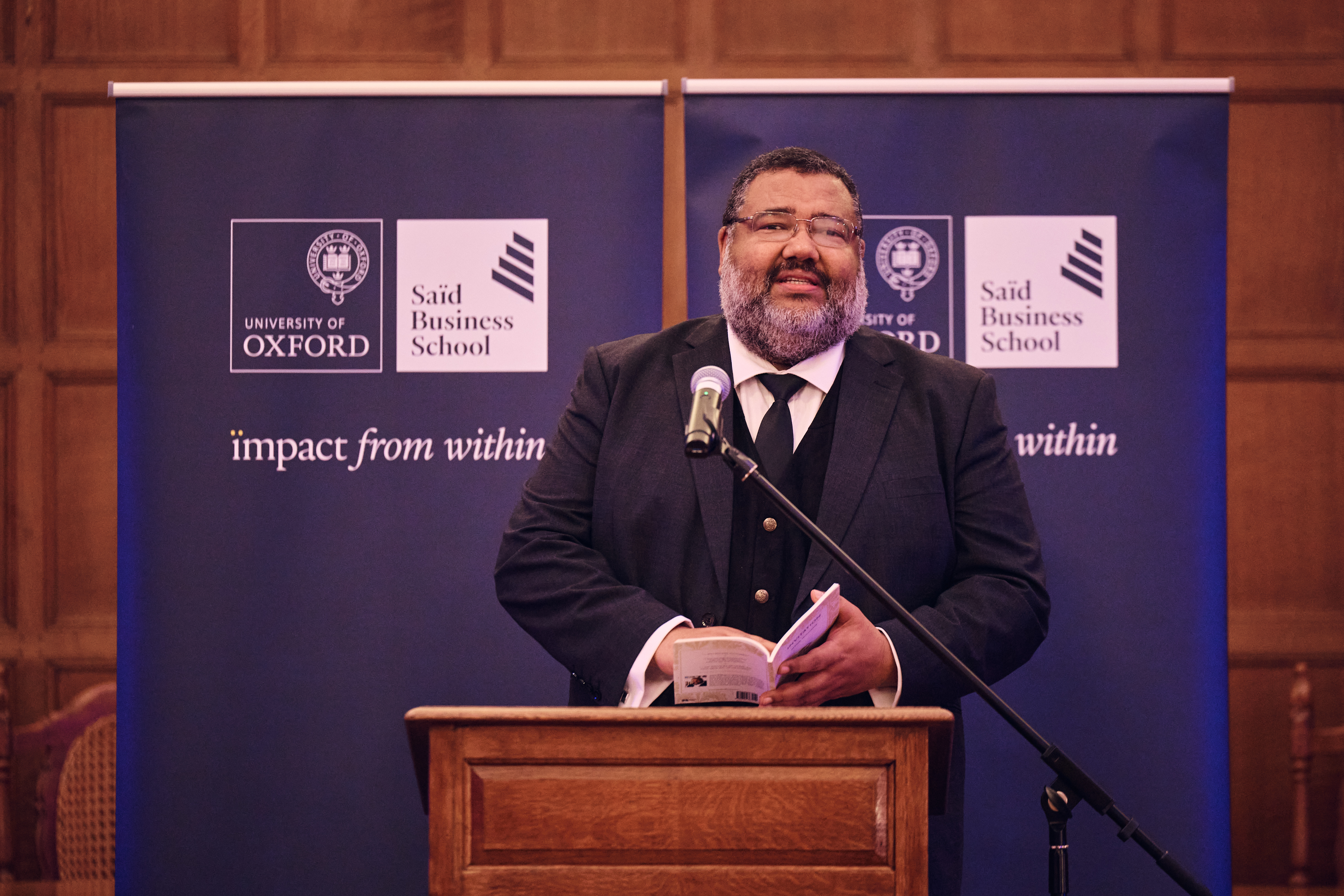

Williams holds the following degrees:

- BSc (Engineering)(Mech), University of the Witwatersrand
- MBA, MIT Sloan School of Management
- MSc (Finance), London Business School
- MPhil (Political Theory), University of Oxford (Hertford College)
- MPA, Harvard University
- MSc (Political Theory), London School of Economics and Political Science.
- DPhil (Politics), University of Oxford

Williams is a Senior Fellow of Management Practice in Strategy at Oxford Saïd Business School and Academic Director of the Oxford Advanced Management and Leadership Programme. He is a Research Associate at Hertford College. In June 2024, Hertford College awarded Williams an Honorary Fellowship and in 2026, he was appointed the world's first Poet Laureate at a business school.

== Writing ==
He has published a series of children's books about a character called Oaky, including Oaky and the Virus during the COVID-19 pandemic.

== Bibliography ==
=== Poetry ===
- Talking to a Tree: Poems of a Fragile World (2011; Theart Press)
- Whistleblowing (2021; Geko Publishing)

=== Non-fiction ===
- Deep Collusion: Bain and the capture of South Africa (2021; Tafelberg)
- Pushing Boulders: Oppressed to Inspired (2016; Theart Press)

== Awards and honours ==
=== Literary ===
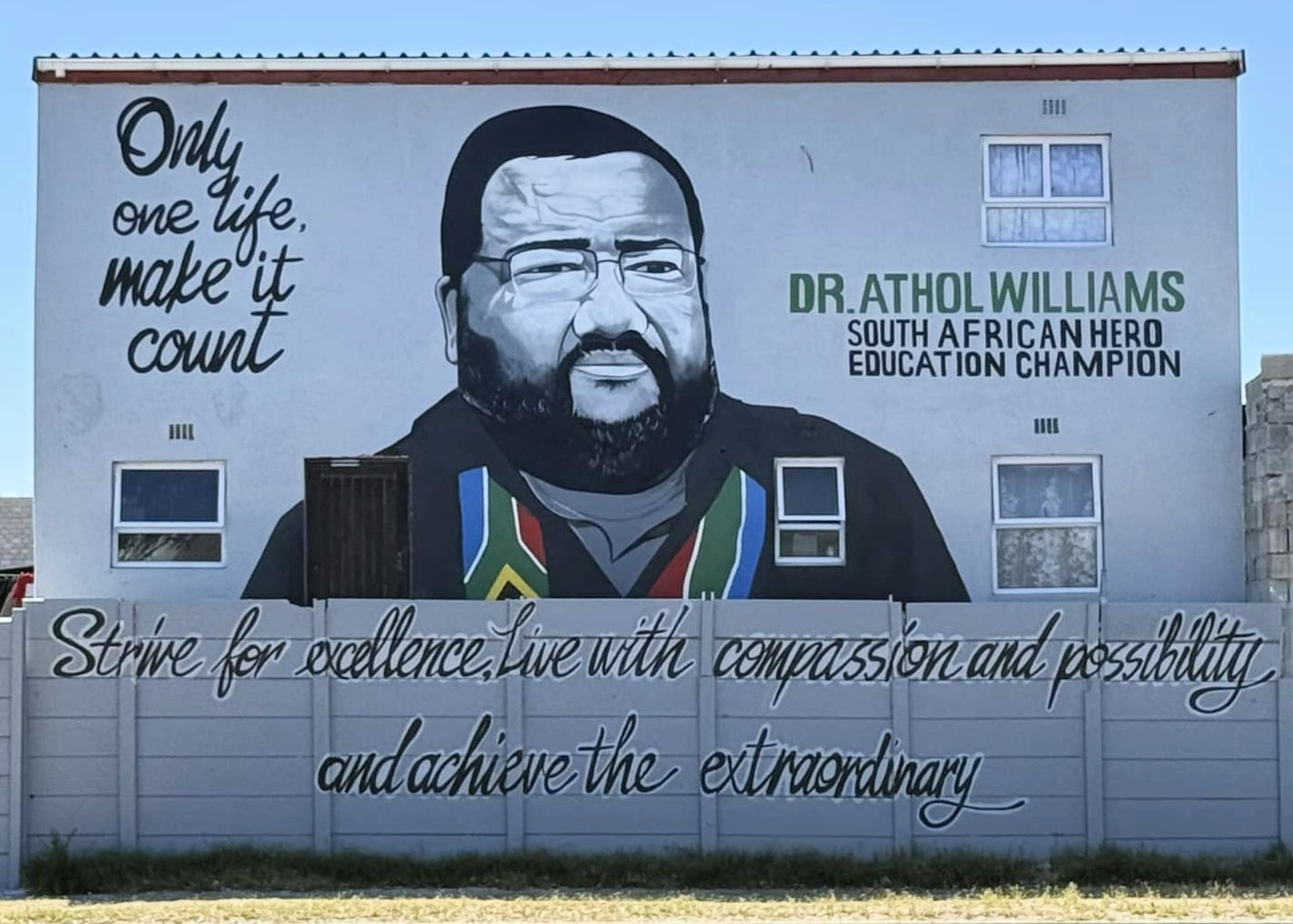
Mural of Dr Athol Williams (Cape Town)

- Sol Plaatje European Union Poetry Award (2015 and 2016)
- Award for Best Story, Short.Sharp.Stories Contest (2025)

=== Public Service ===
- Special Recognition Award, Blueprint for Free Speech, Australia, 2022
- Mayor's Medal for Extraordinary Bravery, Cape Town, South Africa, 2023
- Social Justice Champion of the Year, Centre for Social Justice, South Africa, 2024
