= National Debt of South Africa =

The national debt of South Africa is the total quantity of money borrowed by the Government of South Africa at any time through the issue of securities by the South African Treasury and other government agencies.

As of 2025/26 the gross South African government debt was R6.09 trillion (US$412.04 billion), with a debt-to-GDP ratio of 77.4%.

Roughly 90% of the national debt in 2019/20 was denominated in South African rand thereby reducing borrowing risk due to currency fluctuations. By September 2020 around US$157 billion of South Africa's national debt was externally owned. As of December 2021 the share of domestic bonds held by foreign investors was 28.2%, this represented a declined to a 10-year low.

South African National Government Budget breakdown for 2025/26.

Source: National Treasury (South Africa)

== History ==
=== Apartheid era ===
During apartheid South Africa faced a worsening financial situation stemming from an economic recession and increasing international sanctions in the 1980s. In 1980 the country's total debt amounted to US$16.9 billion, representing a debt to GDP ratio of 20%. By 1984 the country's debt had increased to US$24.3 billion representing a debt to GDP ratio of 46%. The deteriorating political situation stemming from apartheid policies resulted in "huge capital outflows and a temporary closure of foreign exchange markets" between 1984 and 1985. In August 1985 the stability of South Africa's financial situation was put under severe pressure following P.W. Botha's Rubicon speech. The speech and the lack of commitment by the government to roll back apartheid legislation resulted in a sovereign default on the debt when global lenders refused to rollover South Africa's debts. The final payment of $6.89 billion on the $13.6 billion 1985 debt was made by the South African government in 2001.

=== Post-apartheid era ===
South Africa's national debt was effectively reduced during the Mandela and Mbeki administrations. The debt significantly increased from 2008 onwards during the presidencies of Jacob Zuma and Cyril Ramaphosa.

By 2009 South Africa's debt to GDP ratio dropped to 28% from 34.6% in 2006. South Africa's debt grew between 2008 and 2012 as the country prepared for the 2010 FIFA World Cup and run a countercyclical fiscal policy in response to the 2008 financial crisis and the 2020 COVID-19 pandemic. This increased the debt to GDP ratio to 43.9% of GDP by 2014.

== Historic Data ==
Historic Overview of National Debt (1978-2025)
Financial Year	Net loan debt	Gross Debt					Cash Balances	
Financial Year	Net loan debt	Government bonds	Treasury bills	Bridging bonds	Non-marketable	Foreign debt	Domestic cash balance	Foreign cash balance
Financial Year	R billion							
1978/79	15	12	1	0	3	1	(1)	0
1979/80	17	13	1	0	4	1	(1)	0
1980/81	18	15	0	0	4	1	(2)	0
1981/82	20	17	1	0	3	1	(2)	0
1982/83	22	20	1	0	3	1	(3)	0
1983/84	27	23	0	0	4	1	(3)	0
1984/85	34	28	1	0	4	2	(1)	0
1985/86	38	33	1	0	4	2	(1)	0
1986/87	45	39	1	0	4	2	(2)	0
1987/88	56	47	0	0	8	2	(2)	0
1988/89	65	61	0	0	5	2	(4)	0
1989/90	71	71	2	0	7	2	(11)	0
1990/91	87	83	3	0	8	2	(9)	0
1991/92	104	101	4	0	7	3	(10)	0
1992/93	141	133	6	0	5	2	(5)	0
1993/94	185	175	7	0	3	5	(5)	0
1994/95	233	210	7	8	6	9	(7)	0
1995/96	271	249	11	4	5	11	(9)	0
1996/97	305	276	14	0	6	11	(3)	0
1997/98	331	301	17	0	3	15	(5)	0
1998/99	358	326	19	0	2	16	(5)	0
1999/00	374	333	22	0	1	26	(7)	0
2000/01	397	340	26	0	2	32	(3)	0
2001/02	427	332	18	0	2	82	(7)	0
2002/03	417	329	22	0	2	74	(10)	0
2003/04	442	360	29	0	2	65	(13)	0
2004/05	471	394	34	0	3	69	(31)	0
2005/06	470	417	40	0	4	67	(58)	0
2006/07	478	422	46	0	3	83	(75)	0
2007/08	483	426	52	0	3	96	(94)	0
2008/09	526	463	65	0	2	97	(101)	0
2009/10	673	586	115	0	5	99	(107)	(25)
2010/11	820	733	136	0	23	98	(111)	(59)
2011/12	990	890	155	0	26	117	(130)	(68)
2012/13	1,182	1,039	172	0	30	125	(104)	(80)
2013/14	1,379	1,218	192	0	31	144	(121)	(84)
2014/15	1,584	1,399	202	0	31	167	(120)	(94)
2015/16	1,805	1,573	209	0	37	200	(112)	(102)
2016/17	2,008	1,732	250	0	39	213	(110)	(114)
2017/18	2,260	1,950	293	0	29	218	(123)	(106)
2018/19	2,545	2,160	307	0	29	291	(121)	(123)
2019/20	2,998	2,501	333	0	39	387	(112)	(152)
2020/21	3,602	3,071	456	0	16	392	(240)	(94)
2021/22	4,011	3,398	448	0	19	412	(170)	(97)
2022/23	4,516	3,762	423	0	25	556	(121)	(129)
2023/24	5,064	4,129	511	0	28	592	(92)	(103)
2024/25	5,469	4,511	551	0	30	602	(131)	(94)
2025/26	5,964	4,820	588	0	29	653	(50)	(76)

== See also ==
- List of countries by public debt
- Economy of South Africa
- National Budget of South Africa
- Taxation in South Africa
