= Stephen Fritz =

South African indigenous and traditional leader

Chief Stephen Michael Fritz
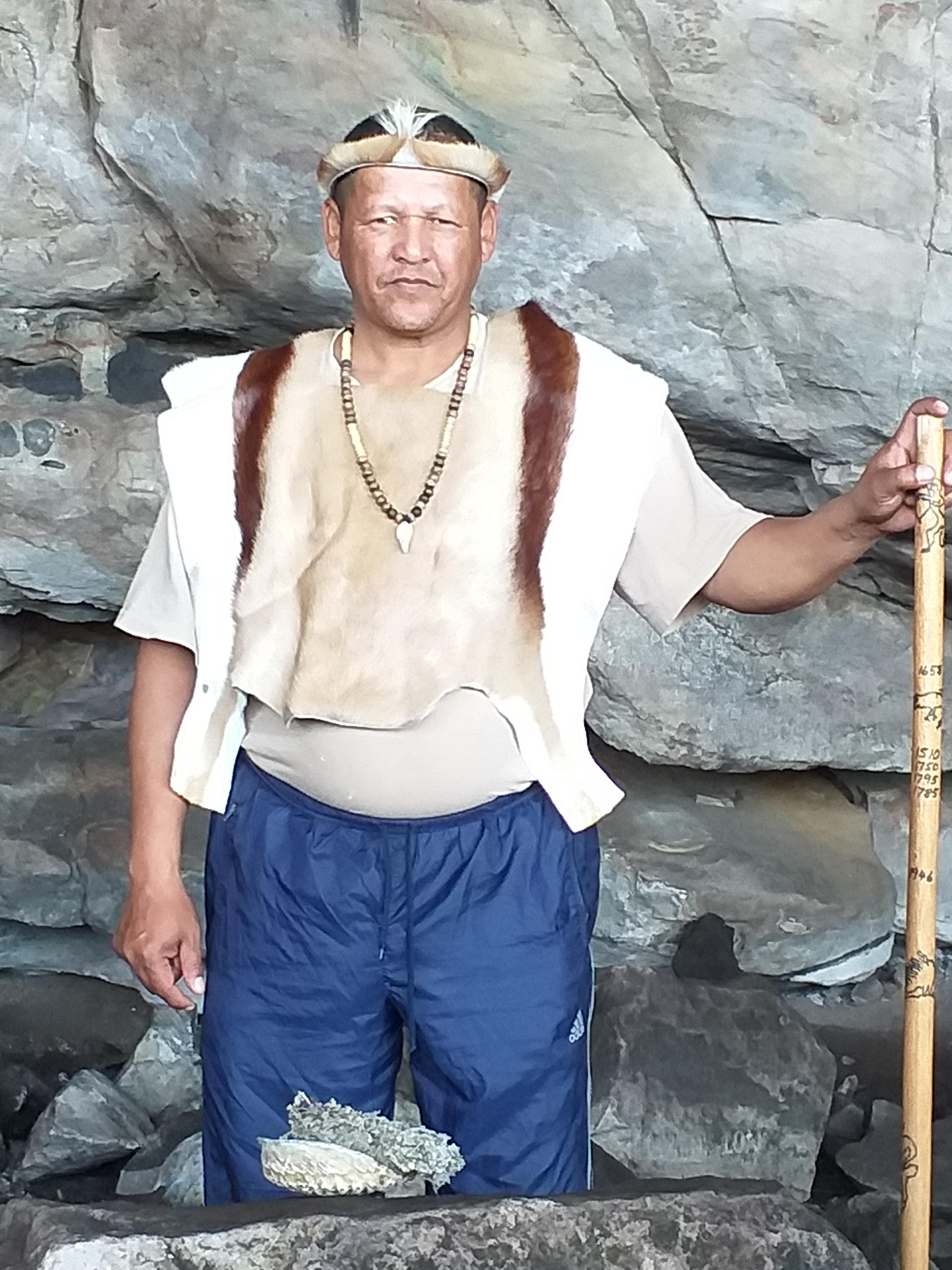
- Born: 4 June 1970 (age 55); Sunnydale, Western Cape, South Africa
- Occupations: Community leader, public speaker, senior chief of the South Peninsula Customary Khoisan Council, traditional healer, indigenous guide
- Years active: 1994 – present
- Spouse: Patricia Natus
- Children: Amanda, Nicole, Stephanie, Jodie, Justin
- Parents: Frederick Zimmerie (father); Kathleen Fritz (mother)
- Website: www.chiefstephenfritz.com

Stephen Michael Fritz is a Khoi leader born in South Africa on 4 March 1970. He is a South African indigenous and traditional leader and Senior Chief of the South Peninsula Khoi Council, which is based in the Western Cape of South Africa. He is a well-known environmentalist and public speaker. He is an expert in the use of plants for medicinal purposes and he is a qualified indigenous guide and wildlife conservationist. He is also an activist for the rights of the indigenous people of South Africa. Chief Fritz is a founding member of the Pro Elephant Network and member of the Wildlife Animal Protection Forum South Africa.

== Education and indigenous heritage ==
Fritz attended conventional schooling during the difficult Apartheid era in South Africa. The Khoisan people have the most incredible knowledge and insight into wild animals and the environment they inhabit. This knowledge has been passed on from generation to generation. Fritz learned about the healing power of medicinal plants from his grandmother Anna Pietersen. The intrinsic belief that the natural world is not separate from the Khoi, that they need to live in perfect harmony with nature is a belief that has been passed onto Fritz.

== Leadership ==
Fritz has been a community leader for more than twenty years and a fore-runner in the movement towards the global recognition of indigenous leaders. He is active promoter and teacher of the Khoi culture. He is committed to raising awareness about the Khoi culture, their history and their heritage. As a Khoi leader Fritz is entitled to hold Khoi ancestral ceremonies.

=== Khoi teacher ===
Fritz has developed social projects in his community which include traditional youth drumming programs. He conducts workshops about the traditional medicinal purposes of indigenous plants Fritz offers classes on the Khoi heritage and history.

=== Community involvement ===
During COVID19 global pandemic Fritz ran a soup kitchen program for the under privileged members of his community.

In his role as a community leader he has taken care of the elderly and the infirm, using his knowledge of traditional medicine. His cultural knowledge especially with regard to the use of indigenous plants is gained from his ancestors, namely his grandmother Anna Pietersen.

=== Political activism ===
Fritz has engaged with members of the National Assembly and of the Parliament of South Africa in Cape Town since 2012. He has advocated on behalf of the movement to recognise the Khoisan culture and their heritage. Fritz has argued for the recognition of the Khoisan land restitution and reform.

He has engaged with stakeholders at the opening of the National House of Traditional Leaders in 2018]

== Environmental advocacy and activism ==
In his capacity as a lion tracker and communicator, Fritz was awarded a scholarship to the annual Academy for Lion Hearted Leadership, as part of the Global White Lion Protection Trust. He has participated in a Global White Lion Protection Trust research project which took place in the UNESCO Kruger to Canyon Biosphere. During this research project he combined his indigenous knowledge with cutting-edge science.

Fritz represented the South Peninsula Khoi Council in the Parliament of South Africa in Cape Town in August 2018. During a two-day colloquium on the captive lion breeding for hunting and lion bone trade, he addressed the Portfolio Committee on Environment, Forestry and Fisheries. Chief Fritz's presentation included the subject matter of the importance of the wild white lion in his culture as well as issues relative to the South African lion bone trade and the trophy hunting of lion. More specifically, he spoke about a controversial killing of a much loved South African lion called Skye who was killed on 7 July 2018 in Umbabat Nature Reserve, a private reserve sharing an unfenced border with the Kruger National Park in South Africa.

Fritz was opening speaker at the "Taking Elephants Out of the Room" Indaba held in Hermanus, South Africa in 2019. This was an international convention of elephant experts addressing the issue of captive elephants. He is the founding member of the Pro Elephant Network, an international organisation of elephant specialists, and he is a member of the Wildlife Animal Protection Forum South Africa. Fritz is presently assisting various conservation organisations and stakeholders with regard to negotiations with the City of Cape Town and Cape Nature.

Fritz is in support of designing better human baboon conflict policies in the Western Cape of South Africa. Due to the deep spiritual connection between the natural environment and the wild animals who reside in it, Fritz is against abusive wildlife practises in South Africa. These practises include the violence and disrespect shown towards the wildlife and the environment during wildlife captivity, wildlife breeding and trophy hunting. He believes these practises are deeply disrespectful to the indigenous people of South Africa.

=== Khoi mountain guide ===
Fritz is a registered indigenous guide, his area of expertise stretches across the mountains between Kommetjie and Ocean View, including Peers Cave and the Elephant Eye. His guided tours include visits to sacred Khoi sites in the Western Cape and the Piketberg.

== Acknowledgements and legacy ==
On 9 February 2012, President of South Africa Jacob Zuma said that "It is important to remember that the Khoisan peoples were the most brutalised by the colonialists who tried to make them extinct and undermine their language and identity. As a free and democratic South Africa today we cannot ignore to correct the past."

On 8 May 1996 President Thabo Mbeki announced at the "I am an African" speech, made to the Constitutional Assembly on the adoption of the South African Constitution: "I owe my being to the Khoi and the San who […] fell victim to the most merciless genocide our native land has ever seen, they who were the first to lose their lives in the struggle to defend our freedom and independence and they who perished in the result".

“We Khoisan are honest, strong and peaceful people. Our understanding of the natural world is deep, sophisticated and comprehensive. There was a deliberate distortion of our history to destroy our dignity and identity. We were victims of cultural genocide and dispossession. We were treated as non-existent people. Soon the day will come when the Khoisan are finally recognised as one of the oldest Peoples of the human species and as the first Nation of South Africa.” Chief Fritz, 2019
