= South African Revenue Service =

Revenue service of the South African government

Coordinates: 25°46′22.06″S 28°13′56.13″E

Agency overview
- Formed: 1 October 1997; 28 years ago
- Preceding agencies: Department of Inland Revenue; Department of Customs and Excise
- Jurisdiction: Government of South Africa
- Headquarters: Lehae la Sars Building; Pretoria, South Africa
- Employees: 12,479 (2020/21)
- Minister responsible: Enoch Godongwana, Minister of Finance
- Agency executive: Dr Ngobani Johnstone Makhubu, Commissioner
- Parent department: National Treasury
- Key document: South African Revenue Service Act 34 of 1997
- Website: sars.gov.za

The South African Revenue Service (SARS) is the revenue service of the South African government. It administers the country's tax system and customs service, and enforces compliance with related legislation. It is governed by the SARS Act 34 of 1997, which established it as "an organ of state within the public administration, but as an institution outside the public service". It thus has a significant degree of administrative autonomy, although it is under the policy control of the Minister of Finance. SARS manages, administers, and implements the tax regime as designed by the Minister and National Treasury.

SARS was established in 1997 by a merger of the customs and inland revenue departments, at the recommendation of the Katz Commission, which had been instituted to review the South African tax system for the post-apartheid era. In subsequent years, under the leadership of Pravin Gordhan, SARS gained a reputation for effectiveness. However, between 2015 and 2019, the agency's tax collection and investigative capacities were severely undermined, or even "decimated", as a result of a restructuring", allegedly calculated to enable the capture of SARS. This was investigated by the Nugent Commission.

== Functions ==
In terms of the SARS Act, the main functions of SARS are to:

- collect all tax and customs revenue due to the state;
- enforce compliance with tax and customs legislation; and
- facilitate legitimate trade through the customs service.

Among others, SARS administers the personal income tax, corporate income tax, capital gains tax, value-added tax, customs and excise duties, skills development levies, environmental levies, unemployment insurance fund contributions, and employment tax incentives.

== History ==
=== Predecessors ===
The Union of South Africa came into existence on 31 May 1910, uniting the Cape Colony, Transvaal Colony, Colony of Natal, and Orange River Colony. Three months later, on 9 August, the Governor-General, Herbert Gladstone, retroactively appointed Joseph Clerc Sheridan, Esq., as the acting Commissioner for Inland Revenue with effect from 1 July 1910. Two days later, on 11 August, the Department of Inland Revenue was established under the control and direction the Minister of Finance. The Department of Inland Revenue was charged with "the duty of properly collecting and duly accounting for all revenues of the Union other than railway and harbour revenues and the revenues which by law or regulation are accounted for by the Commissioner for Customs and Excise or by the Postmaster-General."

=== Mandela and Mbeki presidencies ===
==== Katz Commission ====
At the time that the transition to democracy was completed in 1994, South Africa was marked by immense income inequality and by a long history of tax avoidance, which had been used as a means of protest against the colonial and apartheid governments. Moreover, under apartheid, various bantustans were governed by separate tax administrations. In 1994, the first post-apartheid government instituted the Katz Commission to review the tax structure in South Africa, with an eye to modernising it in line with international best practice and improving its equity and efficiency. The commission, which ran between 1994 and 1999, recommended an overhaul of the entire tax system. In particular, in 1997, the commission recommended that the two agencies responsible for revenue collection at the time – the Department of Inland Revenue and the Customs and Excise Department – should be amalgamated into a single entity and fundamentally reformed. This led to the passage of the SARS Act and the establishment of SARS on 1 October 1997.

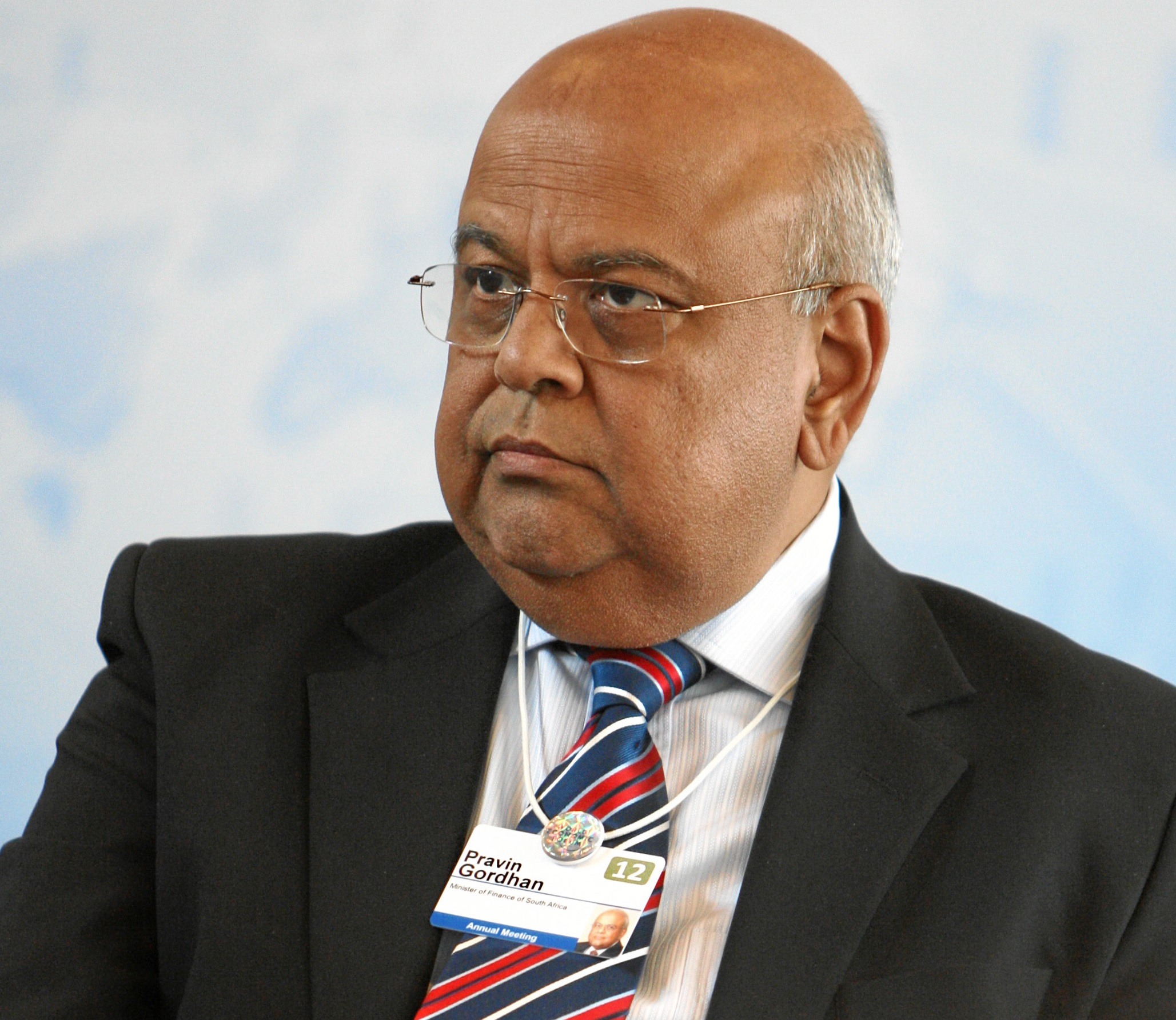
Pravin Gordhan was SARS Commissioner from 1999 to 2009

Following the retirement of the first SARS Commissioner, Trevor van Heerden, in late 1999, van Heerden's deputy Pravin Gordhan was appointed Commissioner. Gordhan is the longest-serving Commissioner to date, having held the role from November 1999 to May 2009, and by the end of his tenure SARS was widely acclaimed as a "success story" or "model public institution." During this period, SARS substantially improved revenue collections and tax compliance, establishing an effective tax bureaucracy. Between 1998 and 2002, for example, the number of individuals registered for tax purposes increased by 43% and the number of companies registered by 40%, while progressive reforms enabled the tax system to contribute to the government's redistributive programme. A 2014 benchmarking review by the International Monetary Fund found that SARS conformed to good international practice in 15 of 27 indicators and performed only slightly worse than that on the other 12 indicators, overall a "world class" performance.

=== Zuma presidency ===
==== Leadership changes ====
In May 2009, Gordhan was appointed Minister of Finance and replaced at SARS by Oupa Magashula. In March 2013, however, a recording was leaked to the media of part of a phone call in which Magashula improperly offered a top SARS job to a young female chartered accountant. Gordhan appointed a fact-finding inquiry, led by Zak Yacoob and Muzi Sikhakhane, to investigate possible misconduct. In July, the inquiry found that Magashula's conduct had endangered SARS's reputation and that Magashula had been dishonest during the course of the proceedings. Magashula resigned, apologising for the "inappropriate conversation," which he said had been "banter" and did not reflect any intention to subvert proper recruitment processes. It was later alleged, in 2016, that the conversation had been illegally recorded by crime intelligence operatives.

Following a fourteen-month period in which Magashula's former deputy, Ivan Pillay, acted as Commissioner, President Jacob Zuma appointed the controversial Tom Moyane to replace Magashula. Years later, Moyane admitted that Zuma had informed him that he intended to appoint him long before the appointment was publicly or formally made. He has been described by journalist Adriaan Basson as having been "willing to choose the interests of Zuma and his cronies over those of the country," and by a subsequent commission of inquiry as having "considered SARS to be his personal fiefdom, whose money he could spend in his own interests."

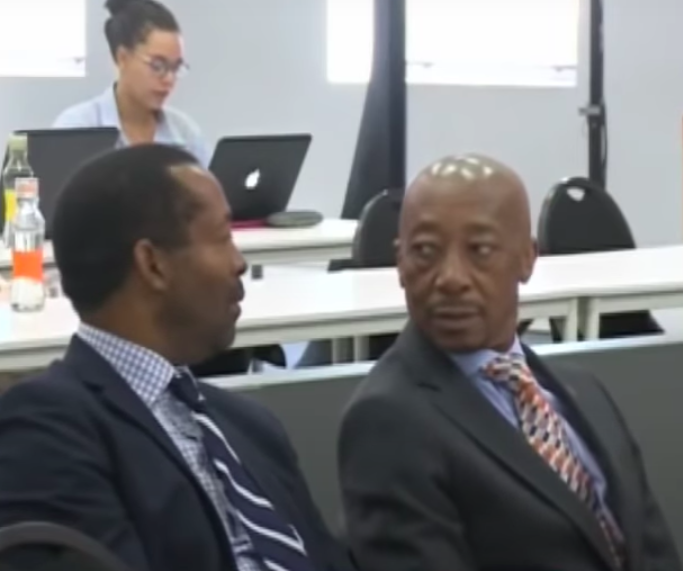
Tom Moyane (right) at the Zondo Commission in 2019

==== State capture revelations ====
By 2016, SARS was being implicated in developing allegations about state capture under the Zuma presidency. In February of that year, amaBhungane published a story about an initiative to restructure the key Large Business Centre at SARS. It reported that the restructuring was destabilising SARS and might have been "a deliberate attempt by Moyane's 'new guard' to give themselves undue influence." The journalists were subsequently sued by Moyane and acting chief operations officer Jonas Makwakwa, both in a personal capacity and on behalf of SARS, and both for defamation and for unlawfully disclosing taxpayer information in contravention of the Tax Administration Act. The latter charge led to a protracted dispute between SARS and amaBhungane about the correct interpretation of the law's confidentiality protections. Further journalistic investigations followed, including in Jacques Pauw's 2017 The President's Keepers; Pauw was also sued by SARS for contravening the Tax Administration Act. Other details were elicited or demonstrated during the course of the Nugent Commission, which ran in 2018, and the Zondo Commission, which has been ongoing since 2018.

===== Involvement of Bain & Company =====
Soon after Moyane was appointed in September 2014, Bain & Company was contracted to review and later to restructure SARS. The Nugent Commission ultimately found that the procurement process had been "manipulated" in Bain's favour. Bain representatives had met several times with Moyane and with President Zuma himself prior to submitting a bid for the contract – and even prior to Moyane's appointment as Commissioner. The head of the local Bain office later testified that Bain had provided "executive coaching" to Moyane a year before his appointment. The commission also found that the restructuring plan ultimately recommended by Bain was highly damaging to SARS, and suggested that Bain and Moyane had pursued the plan "in deep collusion" and for purely self-interested reasons. It called this

a premeditated offensive against SARS, strategized by the local [Gauteng] office of Bain & Company... for Mr Moyane to seize SARS, each in pursuit of their own interests that were symbiotic, but not altogether the same. Mr Moyane's interest was to take control of SARS. Bain's interest was to make money.

Whistleblower Athol Williams, a former Bain partner, agreed with this assessment, testifying at length at the Zondo Commission about Bain's extensive engagements with Zuma and Moyane about plans to restructure SARS and other public entities.

===== Restructuring =====
[T]here has been a massive failure of integrity and governance at SARS, and all else follows from that. What SARS was, and what it has become, is sufficient proof in itself that integrity and governance failed on a massive scale... [Moyane] arrived without integrity and then dismantled the elements of governance one by one. This was more than mere mismanagement. It was seizing control of SARS as if it was his to have... [T]he organisational structure of SARS, that provided oversight, was pulled apart. Dissent was stamped out by instilling distrust and fear. Accountability to other state authorities was defied. Capacity for investigating corruption was disabled.

— Report of the Nugent Commission

The Nugent Commission found that the restructuring of SARS that occurred after 2014, under the advice of Bain & Company, largely had the effect of undermining SARS's tax collection capacity and quality of governance. Most significantly, oversight of individual tax and corporate tax were amalgamated into a single unit, called Business and Individual Tax, which reported directly to the Commissioner. At the same time, other key business units were fragmented, especially the Large Business Centre – which had been responsible for 35% of SARS's revenue and which the Nugent Commission said was "eviscerated" – and also the Litigation Unit and Compliance Unit. The Anti-Corruption and Security Unit, which investigated internal corruption at SARS and which had consistently been rated as among the best such units in the South African government, was also restructured such that its independence was undermined. The Executive Committee of SARS had by the end of 2015 "been denuded of virtually all the management and skills that had existed when Mr Moyane arrived". An existing modernisation strategy was also suspended, pending a review which the commission found to have been valueless.

Gordhan, then Minister of Finance and reportedly clashing with Moyane on several fronts, attempted unsuccessfully to block the restructuring in 2016, raising concerns about its likely effects on the agency's capacity. He has said that, in the same year, he asked Zuma to fire Moyane, on the basis that his and Moyane's working relationship had broken down. Among the detrimental consequences of the restructuring later identified by the Nugent Commission were that non-compliance became easier; that some 200 managers were displaced from their former positions and often relegated to less meaningful roles; that SARS's relationship with other state institutions, and its international reputation, suffered; and that SARS's measures to counter criminality were "rendered ineffective," to the benefit of the illicit tobacco trade in particular. The Tobacco Institute of South Africa told Parliament that South Africa lost R27 billion in customs and excise revenue between 2014 and 2018, and total tax collections fell by about R90 billion between 2015 and 2018.

===== Rogue unit allegations =====
On 12 October 2014, shortly after Moyane's appointment, the Sunday Times reported that one of the SARS investigative units had gone "rogue," and had broken into Zuma's home to plant listening devices. In subsequent articles, it published various other allegations about nefarious activities of the so-called rogue unit. On the basis of the allegations, Moyane disbanded both the unit and the SARS Executive Committee. The unit was also investigated by an independent panel chaired by Muzi Sikhakhane, which found in November 2014 that the unit had been established unlawfully. Moyane appointed KPMG at a cost of R23 million to perform investigations "focused on the conduct of" four employees cited in the Sikhakhane report, one of whom was former acting Commissioner Pillay. A series of protracted labour disputes followed, in which Pillay and others were suspended and subject to disciplinary charges arising largely from the rogue unit allegations, and Pillay resigned in May 2015. Other senior managers and investigators also departed, under similar circumstances and amid public perception that they had been "driven out" of or "purged" from SARS. The Nugent Commission later said it was highly plausible that Moyane's response to the rogue unit allegations had been "the first step in 'neutralising' possible detractors" within SARS, and Nugent said that, regardless of the source of the original allegations, SARS had used them "opportunistically."

The report of the KPMG investigation was submitted to Moyane in December 2015, and recommended that Gordhan, then the Minister of Finance, should be investigated for his role in establishing the unit while SARS Commissioner. The Daily Maverick reported that part of the KPMG report was copied and pasted from recommendations made by SARS's own legal team, and accused SARS and KPMG of conspiring against the unit and its members. Almost two years later in September 2017, KPMG withdrew the 2015 report, despite Moyane's objections, and apologised to Gordhan. Retired judge Frank Kroon of the Kroon Committee, another inquiry into the allegations, also disowned and retracted his prejudicial findings on the rogue unit, and in 2020 SARS announced that it would not rely on or use the Sikhakhane report for any purpose.

The Sunday Times, which broke many of the rogue unit stories, has since faced criticism for having been "drawn into an elaborate cloak-and-dagger campaign to discredit SARS" and for exhibiting "poor journalistic standards" – or, in Jacques Pauw's words, for "arguably the worst journalism that has ever been perpetrated in this country." In December 2015, the Press Ombudsman found that its coverage of the rogue unit allegations had been "inaccurate, misleading and unfair," and the Times published an apology admitting to factual errors and other missteps. The Nugent Commission found that it had done "great damage to SARS and the people of South Africa."

===== Allegations against Pravin Gordhan =====
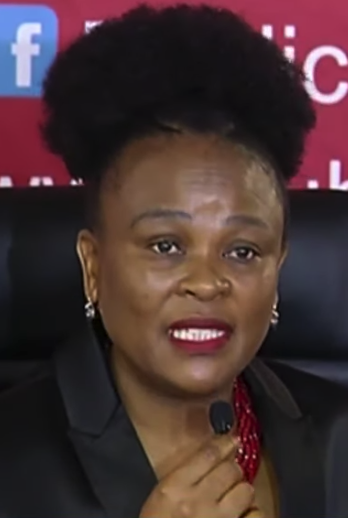
Busisiwe Mkhwebane investigated Gordhan for his activities at SARS

The Hawks investigated Gordhan in relation to the rogue unit allegations, and intensified their investigation shortly before the 2016 Budget Speech, timing which Gordhan suggested was calculated to "intimidate and distract" him and the National Treasury. In October 2016, fraud charges were brought against Gordhan, Pillay, and Magashula, in relation to early retirement benefits paid to Pillay with the authorisation of Gordhan and Magashula in 2010 (before Pillay left retirement to rejoin SARS). At the Zondo Commission, senior SARS official Vlok Symington testified that he had effectively been "held hostage" in the SARS offices by Moyane's bodyguard and Hawks officers, who wanted Symington to hand over a document which cast doubt on the legitimacy of the charges against Gordhan. The charges were withdrawn shortly afterwards. The Public Protector Busisiwe Mkhwebane also conducted several investigations into Gordhan's conduct at SARS and in 2019 recommended that he should be subject to disciplinary action in relation to Pillay's early retirement. The Pretoria High Court overturned the recommendation, finding that the relevant part of Mkhwebane's report was "vague, contradictory and/or nonsensical."

The attention of law enforcement to Gordhan is largely believed to have been politically motivated – Zuma fired Gordhan from the Finance Ministry in March 2017 – and Gordhan later told the Zondo Commission that he believed that Moyane had pursued the criminal charges against him as part of an effort to facilitate the capture of the Treasury.

=== Ramaphosa presidency ===
==== Nugent Commission ====
In his February 2018 State of the Nation address, newly elected President Cyril Ramaphosa committed to "stabilise and strengthen" SARS, and to restore its credibility. He said that, at the request of the Minister of Finance Malusi Gigaba, he would institute a commission of inquiry into the situation at SARS. A month later, on 19 March 2018, he suspended Moyane pending disciplinary proceedings, writing in a letter to Moyane that

Developments at the SARS under your leadership have resulted in a deterioration in public confidence in the institution and in public finances being compromised. For the sake of the country and the economy, this situation cannot be allowed to continue, or to worsen.

Moyane's suspension followed a meeting during which Ramaphosa told Moyane that "he had lost confidence in his ability to lead SARS", and "offered him an opportunity to resign", which Moyane declined. The Commission of Inquiry Into Tax Administration and Governance by SARS, commonly known as the Nugent Commission, was formally appointed two months later, on 23 May, under the chairmanship of retired judge Robert Nugent. It had a mandate to investigate various operational, administrative, and governance matters at SARS, and focused primarily on the years after mid-2014, at which point Nugent said that SARS's previously good condition had begun to deteriorate.

The commission's interim report, released in October 2018, recommended that Moyane should immediately be fired, on the basis that there had been "at least reckless mismanagement" under his tenure which "ought not to be permitted to continue". In line with this recommendation, Ramaphosa fired Moyane on 1 November. Moyane later unsuccessfully challenged his dismissal and the commission's report in court. The final report was released in December and concluded that SARS had been subject to extreme mismanagement along the lines discussed above, amounting to what it called a "catastrophe". Among the commission's recommendations were that:

- The National Prosecuting Authority should consider criminal prosecution related to the awarding of the Bain & Company contract;
- SARS should re-establish its Large Business Centre, Compliance Unit, and Integrity Unit;
- SARS should re-establish its capacity to monitor and investigate illicit trades;
- SARS should pursue the recovery of state funds used by Moyane to pay for personal legal fees;
- All posts at SARS should be re-evaluated, and "reparations" should be made to mistreated employees;
- Legislation should be amended, including to amend the procedure for appointing the SARS Commissioner; and
- An Inspector-General should be appointed at SARS.

On the involvement of Bain & Company, Nugent acknowledged that Bain had unconditionally paid back about R217 million to cover the value of the contract with interest, and that there was no evidence that Bain headquarters was complicit in the scheme. However, he also emphasised the parent corporation's responsibility for the activities of its local offices, and chastised Bain representatives – both from headquarters and from the South African office – for failing to cooperate adequately with the inquiry.

Moyane declined to appear before the Nugent Commission but responded to its report in May 2021 at the Zondo Commission. He called the findings "preposterous", although he said that he had never read the full report. He also maintained that he had "performed sterlingly" at SARS and that his removal had been "orchestrated" by Gordhan, with whom he had an acrimonious relationship and who he claimed was racist towards him. By contrast, another witness at the Zondo Commission – the former SARS group executive – suggested that Moyane had been appointed precisely in order to undermine SARS's efforts to counteract illicit trade, organised crime, and tax evasion. Others have implied the same.

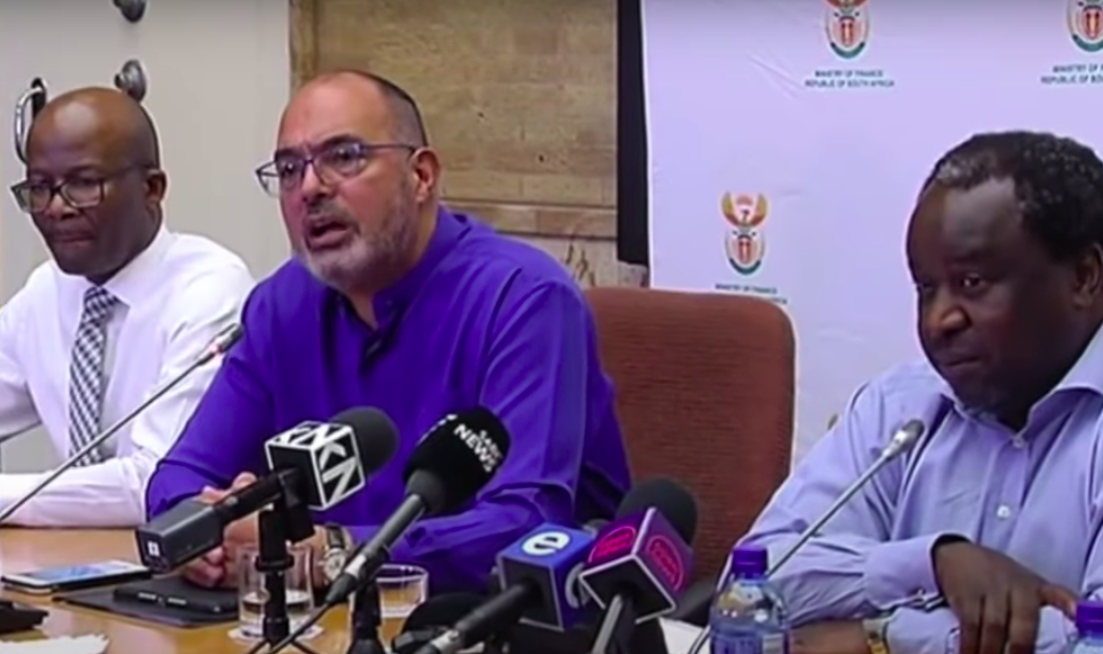
Edward Kieswetter and Finance Minister Tito Mboweni at a press briefing announcing Kieswetter's appointment

==== Aftermath ====
The day after Moyane's suspension, long-time SARS employee Mark Kingon was appointed acting SARS Commissioner, and he continued to act in that role after Ramaphosa had dismissed Moyane permanently. On 1 May 2019, Edward Kieswetter was appointed SARS Commissioner for a term of five years. Kieswetter is the former SARS Deputy Commissioner and former chief executive officer of financial services provider Alexander Forbes, and his appointment was recommended by an independent selection panel chaired by former Finance Minister Trevor Manuel.

Since 2019, Kieswetter has spoken publicly about his efforts to rebuild the agency's capacity and reputation following the "massive failure in governance and integrity" within SARS between 2014 and 2018. He has cited as residual obstacles internal opposition to reform, low employee morale, and the high rate of turnover since 2014 – in April 2021, he told Parliament that more than 2,000 employees had left SARS since 2014. According to Kieswetter, state capture "traumatised" the organisation and its employees. However, SARS has re-established its Large Business Centre, Compliance Unit, and other key units; and taxpayer compliance improved by 26% in the 2020/21 financial year.

On 2 April 2026, President Ramaphosa announced the appointment of Dr Ngobani Johnstone Makhubu as the new SARS Commissioner for a five-year term commencing 1 May 2026, succeeding Kieswetter whose contract concluded on 30 April 2026. The appointment was made in terms of section 6 of the SARS Act following a unanimous recommendation by a selection panel convened by Finance Minister Enoch Godongwana and chaired by former Finance Minister Nhlanhla Nene. Dr Makhubu had served as Deputy Commissioner for Taxpayer Engagement and Operations since May 2023 and had been involved in formulating SARS strategic direction since 2020, playing an active role in implementing the Vision 2024 strategy alongside Kieswetter. The Vision 2024 strategy delivered revenue collections with a compounded annual growth rate of 7.6 percent while voluntary compliance rose by 3.4 percentage points. Dr Makhubu brings more than 17 years of senior leadership experience across the public and private sectors, spanning tax administration, finance, mining, power generation and fast-moving consumer goods, and holds a PhD in Leadership, a Master in Business Leadership, a Bachelor of Electrical Engineering and a Bachelor of Economics. President Ramaphosa described SARS as a key institution responsible for mobilising financial resources to fund infrastructure and social services, and noted that the transition demonstrated the value of structured succession planning within the state.

A requirement to submit an online travel declaration was introduced for most travellers entering or leaving South Africa on 1 July 2026. Before they travel, unless they qualify for one of a limited number of paper-based exceptions, all travellers must complete a declaration form, part of the Customs process, which SARS says "helps travellers [to] meet their legal obligation to declare goods, currency, bearer negotiable instruments (traveller's cheques, bearer cheques, money orders, and bearer bonds) and other relevant items in their possession".

== Organisational structure ==
On 1 July 2020, SARS completed its transition to a new and flatter organisational structure, based around four "clusters":

- Tax engagement (with nine geographic regions and three segment-based regions);
- Enterprise design and enablement;
- Enterprise services and support; and
- Corporate.

== Tax collection ==
South African 2022 Budget Expected Revenue

	2017	2018	2019	2020	2021	2022
Personal Income Tax	482.1	505.8	552.9	546.8	516	587.9
Vat	312.8	348.1	360.5	360.6	370.2	439.7
Corporate Income Tax	218.7	231.2	229.6	230.2	213.1	269.9
Customs And Excise Duties	96.1	97.4	106.8	112.7	100.5	117.4
Fuel Levies	70.9	84.8	89.5	91.8	83.1	89.1
Other	84.9	77.5	83	83.4	82.2	94.5
Total	1265.5	1344.8	1422.3	1425.5	1365.1	1598.5

== Commissioners ==
The chief executive officer and accounting authority at SARS is the Commissioner, who, under Section 6 of the SARS Act, is appointed by the President for a pre-determined (but renewable) term not exceeding five years. Prior to an amendment to the act in 2002, the Commissioner was appointed by the Minister of Finance in consultation with the cabinet and the SARS board.

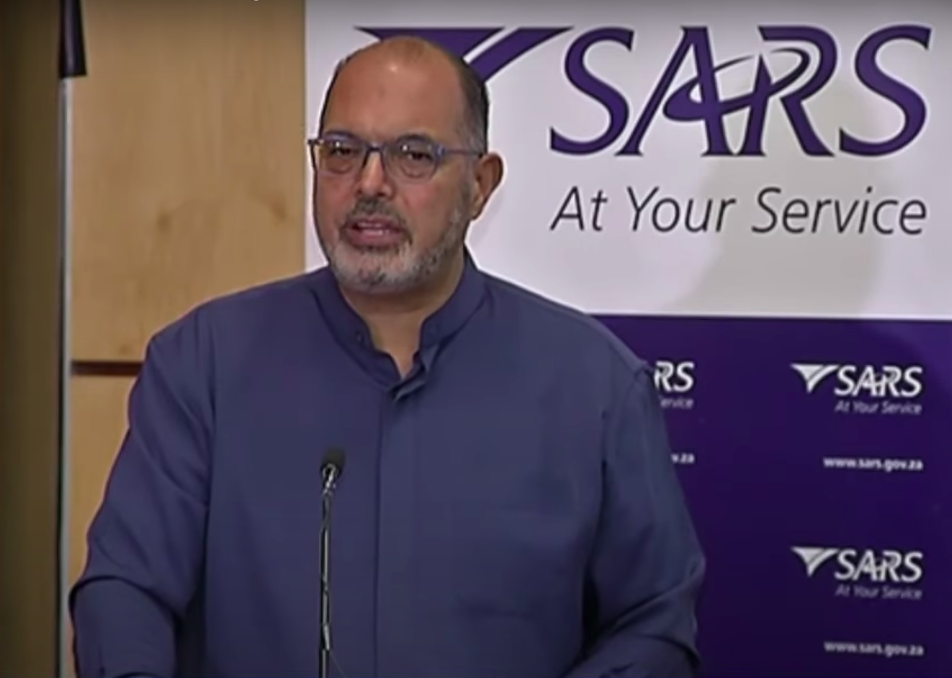
SARS Commissioner Edward Kieswetter in 2019

The list of SARS Commissioners is as follows:

Commissioner	Start of term	End of term	Appointed under	
Dr Ngobani Johnstone Makhubu	May 2026	–	President Cyril Ramaphosa	
Edward Kieswetter	May 2019	April 2026 (conclusion of contract)	President Cyril Ramaphosa	
Mark Kingon (acting)	March 2018	May 2019	President Cyril Ramaphosa	
Tom Moyane	September 2014	March 2018 (suspended) November 2018 (fired)	President Cyril Ramaphosa	President Jacob Zuma
Ivan Pillay (acting)	July 2013	September 2014		President Jacob Zuma
Oupa Magashula	May 2009 (acting) July 2009 (permanent)	July 2013		President Jacob Zuma
Pravin Gordhan	November 1999	May 2009	Minister Trevor Manuel	
Trevor van Heerden	October 1997	September 1999	Minister Trevor Manuel	

== See also ==
- SARS eFiling
- Nhlanhla Nene
- Progressive taxation
- National Budget of South Africa
