= Speech at the Opening of the Parliament of South Africa, 1990 =

1990 speech by South African president F. W. de Klerk

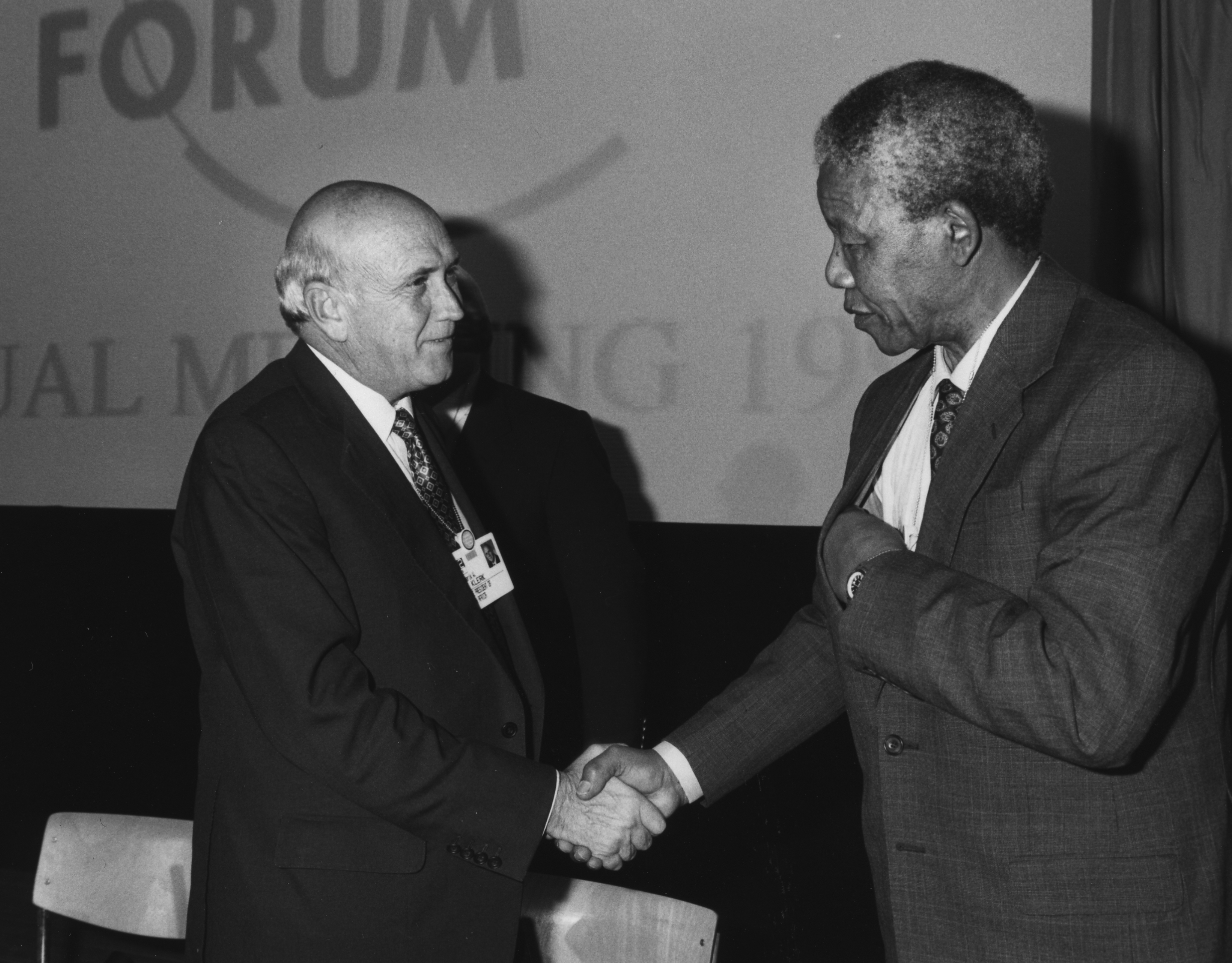
- State President F. W. de Klerk and ANC leader Nelson Mandela
- Date: 2 February 1990; 36 years ago
- Venue: South African Houses of Parliament
- Location: Cape Town, South Africa
- Participants: F. W. de Klerk

On 2 February 1990, the State President of South Africa F. W. de Klerk delivered a speech at the opening of the 1990 session of the Parliament of South Africa in Cape Town in which he announced sweeping reforms that marked the beginning of the negotiated transition from apartheid to constitutional democracy. The reforms promised in the speech included the unbanning of the African National Congress (ANC) and other anti-apartheid organisations, the release of political prisoners including Nelson Mandela, the end of the state of emergency, and a moratorium on the death penalty.

== Background ==
South Africa's ruling National Party (NP) had instituted a policy of apartheid in 1948, separating the different ethnic groups into set areas and only giving white South Africans the right to vote. This was opposed by several groups including the African National Congress (ANC) which often resorted to violent means to oppose it. This resulted in most African nationalist groups being banned by the apartheid government. Accordingly, the South African government made it a criminal offence to be a member of any banned organisation. As a result, Nelson Mandela, the leader of the ANC, was arrested by the South African Police and had been in prison for 27 years at the time of the speech. In 1984, South Africa introduced a new constitution establishing a Tricameral Parliament with representation for Coloureds and Indians as well as whites and making the role of State President an executive post. P. W. Botha of the National Party was the first to hold it but he resigned in 1989 following a stroke, after which he was "effectively forced out of office by cabinet ministers regarded as less intractable about talking with ANC" and its supporters. F. W. de Klerk was elected as the new State President by National Party members (though Botha retained party leadership) beating Pik Botha and Barend du Plessis.

Upon winning the 1989 South African general election, de Klerk started to loosen restrictions on peaceful protest marches and released political prisoners such as Thabo Mbeki. He then secretly met with Mandela and discussed the end of apartheid. Two days before giving the speech, he swore his cabinet to secrecy after telling them what he was going to do.

== Speech ==
When de Klerk gave the speech on 2 February 1990, he had not planned to release Mandela and only told his wife in the car on the way to Parliament that he would. He had previously been urged to by the British Prime Minister Margaret Thatcher who told him it would have the biggest impact over any other action he could take. De Klerk started his speech by commenting on foreign relations and human rights before announcing the suspension of the death penalty. After discussing economic issues, de Klerk announced the unbanning of the ANC, the Pan Africanist Congress, the South African Communist Party and a number of their associated ancillary groups. The audience audibly gasped at hearing this being announced. He then announced an end to some of the restrictions implemented in the state of emergency.

De Klerk then announced he would begin negotiations to end the apartheid system and would negotiate for an equal country with equal rights and protections and voting rights for all. Following this, he announced he was releasing Mandela unconditionally but the release would be delayed slightly due to concerns over right-wing extremists and due to administrative issues. He ended by inviting all political leaders to join in the negotiations.

== Reaction ==
During the speech, Conservative Party MPs walked out shouting "traitor" at him. The Conservative MP Koos van der Merwe said "de Klerk is a traitor to his own people, he's trying to kill the Afrikaner nation." In Cape Town, crowds gathered on the streets to wave ANC flags in celebration, while in Johannesburg people also assembled, but police acting under emergency rules left in place by de Klerk used tear gas and nightsticks to break up the marching crowds. The Conservatives led a strike in Pretoria one year later in February 1991, where 5,000 white farmers blocked the roads.

Domestically, Archbishop Desmond Tutu said that de Klerk "...has taken my breath away". However Mandela's wife Winnie doubted the sincerity citing that it was dangerous to unban all the African nationalist organisations, saying "we're not going to accept a bone without meat". Internationally, Thatcher wrote to congratulate de Klerk for making the move. The President of the United States George H. W. Bush responded positively to the news but needed to hear more before he would lift American sanctions on South Africa.

De Klerk would later announce Mandela's release on 11 February 1990. South Africa held a whites only referendum in March 1992 asking if they approved the end of apartheid, which the result was 68% for yes over Conservative opposition. An interim constitution was set up in 1993 in preparation for the 1994 South African general election.

== See also ==
- Rubicon speech
- I Am an African
