= Electronic services delivery =

Electronic services delivery or ESD refers to providing government services through the Internet or other electronic means. It is related to e-services and e-government.

== Defining e-service ==
E-service (or eservice) is a highly generic term usually referring to ‘The provision of services via the Internet (the prefix 'e' standing for ‘electronic’, as it does in many other usages), thus e-Service may also include e-Commerce, although it may also include non-commercial services (online), which is usually provided by the government.’ (Alexei Pavlichev & G. David Garson, 2004: 169-170; Muhammad Rais & Nazariah, 2003: 59, 70-71).

‘An umbrella term for services available on the Internet, e-Service include e-Commerce transaction services for handling online orders, application hosting by application service providers (ASPs) and any processing capability that is obtainable on the Web.’ (Computer Desktop Encyclopedia, 2009)

E-Service or 'electronic service' constitutes the online services available on the Internet, whereby a valid transaction of buying and selling (procurement) is possible, as opposed to the traditional websites, whereby only descriptive information are available, and no online transaction is made possible.' (Jeong, 2007).
