= Robert Nugent (judge) =

South African judge

Judge of the Supreme Court of Appeal
- In office 2002–2013
- Appointed by: Thabo Mbeki

Judge of the Supreme Court
- In office 1993–2001
- Appointed by: F. W. de Klerk
- Division: Transvaal

Personal details
- Born: Robert Wolseley Nugent; 3 October 1948 (age 77) Germiston, Transvaal; Union of South Africa
- Education: Kimberley Boys' High School
- Alma mater: University of the Witwatersrand

Robert Wolseley Nugent (born 3 October 1948) is a South African retired judge who served in the Supreme Court of Appeal from 2002 to 2013. Formerly an advocate and Senior Counsel in Johannesburg, he was appointed to the bench in 1993 as a judge of the Transvaal Provincial Division (later the Gauteng High Court). In 2018, he chaired the Nugent Commission into maladministration at the South African Revenue Service.

== Early life and legal career ==
Nugent was born on 3 October 1948 in Germiston. He matriculated at Kimberley Boys' High School in 1965. Over the next decade, he worked in commerce and journalism and studied at the University of the Witwatersrand, where he completed a BCom in 1970 and an LLB cum laude in 1974.

After graduating, he worked as a legal adviser to the Johannesburg City Council for one year and then lived abroad for two years, working in industrial relations. Thereafter he returned to Johannesburg, where he was admitted as an advocate in January 1978. He practiced law at the Johannesburg Bar for the next 15 years, taking silk in 1991.

== Gauteng High Court: 1993–2001 ==
On 15 November 1993, Nugent joined the bench as a judge of the Transvaal Provincial Division of the Supreme Court of South Africa. He presided at the Johannesburg seat of the Supreme Court (later the High Court) for the next eight years. During that time he presided in the inquest into the death of 19 protestors during the Shell House massacre.

In October 2000, the Judicial Service Commission interviewed Nugent as a candidate for elevation to one of four vacancies in the Supreme Court of Appeal. During his interview, held in Pretoria, he was asked at length about transformation and affirmative action in the judiciary. By that time, according to the Mail & Guardian, he was "widely admired as being among the very best judges in this country".

== Supreme Court of Appeal: 2002–2013 ==
President Thabo Mbeki appointed Nugent to the Supreme Court of Appeal in 2002. His notable appellate judgements include Oudekraal Estates v City of Cape Town, co-written with Craig Howie, and Greys Marine Hout Bay v Minister of Public Works, both important judgements in administrative law, as well as Midi Television v Director of Public Prosecutions (Western Cape) on the limits of the sub judice rule.

== Constitutional Court nominations ==
While serving as a judge of appeal, Nugent was twice shortlisted by the Judicial Service Commission as a candidate for elevation to the Constitutional Court of South Africa. In 2009, he was one of 24 candidates nominated for four vacancies on the Constitutional Court, but he withdrew his application after the Judicial Service Commission declined to investigate allegations of misconduct against Western Cape Judge President John Hlophe. Retired justice Johann Kriegler, who had nominated Nugent for the position, said that Nugent was "not prepared to submit his candidacy to the deliberations of people he does not trust".

In June 2012, Nugent was one of four candidates (alongside Raymond Zondo, Mandisa Maya, and Ronnie Bosielo) to fill Sandile Ngcobo's seat on the Constitutional Court, and, during his interview in Johannesburg, he was subjected to "relentless grilling" over his decision to withdraw from contention in 2009. The Judicial Service Commission recommended all four candidates as suitable for appointment, but President Jacob Zuma elected to appoint Zondo.

== Retirement ==
Nugent retired from the bench in 2003. However, during his retirement, he was appointed by President Zuma to serve as an acting judge in the Constitutional Court from 3 November to 30 November 2015.

In May 2018, Zuma's successor, President Cyril Ramaphosa, appointed Nugent to chair a commission of inquiry into tax administration and governance at the South African Revenue Service (SARS), best known as the Nugent Commission. The commission's interim report, published in October 2018, led to the dismissal of SARS commissioner Tom Moyane. Moyane attempted unsuccessfully to interdict the commission's final report, which was published in December 2018.
