= Rubicon speech =

1985 speech by South African President P. W. Botha

- Date: 15 August 1985; 41 years ago
- Location: Durban, South Africa
- Participants: P. W. Botha

The Rubicon speech was delivered by South African State President P. W. Botha on the evening of 15 August 1985 in Durban. It was widely expected that Botha would announce major reforms in his government, including the dismantling of apartheid and the release of Nelson Mandela. However, he did not do so.

The speech is known as the 'Rubicon speech' because in its second-last paragraph, Botha used the phrase, "I believe that we are today crossing the Rubicon. There can be no turning back," alluding to the historical reference of Julius Caesar crossing the Rubicon River.

== Background ==
After a long period of isolation and strained diplomatic relations between South Africa and the international community, the National Party decided to hold a meeting to bring about reforms in the government. However, the meeting was shrouded in secrecy and mystery, and Botha was reported to have kept quiet and to have not participated even though he was present. This was taken as a sign that he was approving of the proposed changes. There were also reports that Botha did not participate due to his doctor's orders to avoid emotional outburst and not to engage in discussions that might upset him. At the final draft of the original agreed speech, which would be named the "Prog speech" ("Prog" being short for the Progressive Federal Party, then in opposition), and which would have recognised black human dignity, eradicated all forms of discrimination, and created equal opportunities, the nature of the speech, in conjunction with the news that a US bank was threatening to call in its loan, made Botha feel that he was being forced to capitulate to the revolutionary movements. Botha, whose fierce will had earned him the name "Die Groot Krokodil" (The Big Crocodile), simply refused and said he was not going to make that speech but was going to draft his own.

== The speech ==
Due to its anticipation and publicity by different international media houses, the speech was delivered live to a worldwide audience of over 200 million. Botha declared that he would not support majority rule or the participation of black South Africans in the national government, stating there were alternatives offered through the "devolution of power" on the local level, a reference to the bantustans. However, he also conceded that his government had yet to find a political solution for the country's large urban black population, which resided outside the bantustans. Botha refused to release Nelson Mandela from prison, although he claimed that if the latter renounced violent tactics he would, "in principle, be prepared to consider his release." He blamed recent political unrest in South Africa on communist agitators financed by external actors.

In referring to the decisions the speech references as "crossing the Rubicon", Botha accepted that South Africa was passing a point of no return and that his government would maintain the apartheid system, regardless of the external or internal consequences.

== Aftermath ==
The speech had serious ripple effects to the economy of South Africa and it also caused South Africa to be even more isolated by the international community. The rand fell drastically against major currencies and the economy continued to shrink rapidly in growth until after the democratic handover of power a decade later. The speech played an important role in creating the conditions for the government defaulting on part of South Africa national debt obligations in 1985. This is the first and so far only time South Africa experienced a sovereign default.

== See also ==
- Speech at the Opening of the Parliament of South Africa, 1990
