= SARS eFiling =

South African online tax return submission portal

SARS eFiling is the South African governments official online tax returns submission portal for the South African Revenue Service (SARS). SARS eFiling provides free services to individual taxpayers, trusts, companies and tax practitioners to submit tax returns, submit declarations and make relevant payments in an online environment.

The eFiling service is of an international standard and is comparable to online tax submission services offered in the United States, Australia, Singapore, Ireland, Chile and France.

== History ==
The service was originally launched under a different name and business model in 2000 by private sector companies. These private sector companies charged an average fee of R46 per transaction for this service. This chargeable business model failed as taxpayers were loath to pay to submit their tax returns but the technology had proven itself and in September 2003 Taxbreak, the predominant online tax service, was rebranded and launched by the South African Minister of Finance as a free SARS service.

SARS contracted a private company, Interfile (https://interfile.co.za/), to enhance and operate SARSeFiling until 2010 when SARS took the initiative in house. In the 2015/2016 tax year SARS eFiling processed 36.8 million electronic submissions and payments which equates to 98.7% of all submissions and payments to SARS in South Africa.

== Services ==
- Pay-As-You-Earn (EMP201 return)
- Skills Development Levy (included on the EMP201 and EMP501 return)
- Unemployment Insurance Fund (included on the EMP201 and EMP501 return)
- Value Added Tax (VAT201)
- Provisional Tax (IRP6)
- Secondary Tax on Companies (IT56)
- Corporate Income Tax (ITR14)
- Personal Income Tax (ITR12)
- Trusts (ITR12T)
- Advanced Tax Ruling (ATR)
- Change of Personal Details c(IT77/RFC)
- Additional Payments
- Request for Tax Clearance Certificate
- Request for Tax Directive
- Transfer Duty
- Stamp Duty
- Security Transfer Tax (STT)
- Tax Practitioner Registration
- VAT Vendor Search
- Notification Tool
- Tax Calculators
- Complete history of eFiling usage
- Customs payments
- Air Passenger Tax payments

== See also ==
- National Budget of South Africa
- SARS
