= National Treasury (South Africa) =

Government department of South Africa

- List: 10 other official names: Departement van Finansies (Afrikaans); umNyango wezeeMali (Southern Ndebele); iSebe lezeMali (Xhosa); uMnyango Wezezimali (Zulu); Litiko Letetimali (Swazi); Kgoro ya Matlotlo (Northern Sotho); Lefapha la Ditjhelete (Sotho); Lefapha la Matlotlo (Tswana); Ndzawulo ya Timali (Tsonga); Muhasho wa Gwama (Venda)

Department overview
- Formed: 31 May 1910; 116 years ago
- Jurisdiction: Government of South Africa
- Headquarters: Old Reserve Bank Building, 40 Church Square, Pretoria; 25°44′44″S 28°11′18″E
- Employees: 1,167 (2009)
- Annual budget: R 1.17 trillion (2026/27)
- Ministers responsible: Enoch Godongwana, Minister of Finance; Dr David Masondo, Deputy Minister of Finance; Ashor Sarupen, Deputy Minister of Finance
- Department executives: Director-General: National Treasury; Dr Duncan Pieterse
- Website: www.treasury.gov.za

The National Treasury is one of the departments of the South African government. The Treasury manages national economic policy, prepares the South African government's annual budget and manages the government's finances.

Along with the South African Revenue Service and Statistics South Africa, the Treasury falls within the portfolio of the Minister of Finance.

In the 2010 national budget, the Treasury received an appropriation of 1,504.4 million rand and had 730 employees.

== History ==
The Treasury has been responsible for South African Airways, the country's flag air carrier, since December 2014.

Throughout the course of President Jacob Zuma's second administration, the ministry has undergone several changes. Most notably, Nhlanhla Nene was suddenly dismissed on 9 December 2015, without explanation, and replaced with a relatively unknown parliamentary back-bencher from the ruling ANC's caucus, David 'Des' van Rooyen for a record-total of 3 days.

He was, in turn, replaced by Pravin Gordhan after the President faced significant pressure from political and business groups over the move.

On 30 March 2017, Jacob Zuma fired Pravin Gordhan and appointed Malusi Gigaba as Minister of Finance. Following Zuma's resignation, President Cyril Ramaphosa returned Nhlanhla Nene as Minister in his cabinet reshuffle on 26 February 2018.

== Corruption ==
=== Oracle Corporation contract and corruption probe ===
In 2017, a whistleblower notified the U.S. Securities and Exchange Commission and US Department of Justice, alleging possible violations of the Foreign Corrupt Practices Act in awarding of a R1 billion (2015) (equivalent to R1.17 billion or US$88.54 million in 2018) contract to the Oracle Corporation by National Treasury in 2015.

In March 2024, the Special Investigating Unit found that there were conflicts of interest, irregular processes, and non-compliance with policies and legislation, and said it would petition to blacklist Oracle in South Africa, cancel the contract and recover the money paid.

== See also ==
- National Budget of South Africa
