= Tom Moyane =

South African development economist

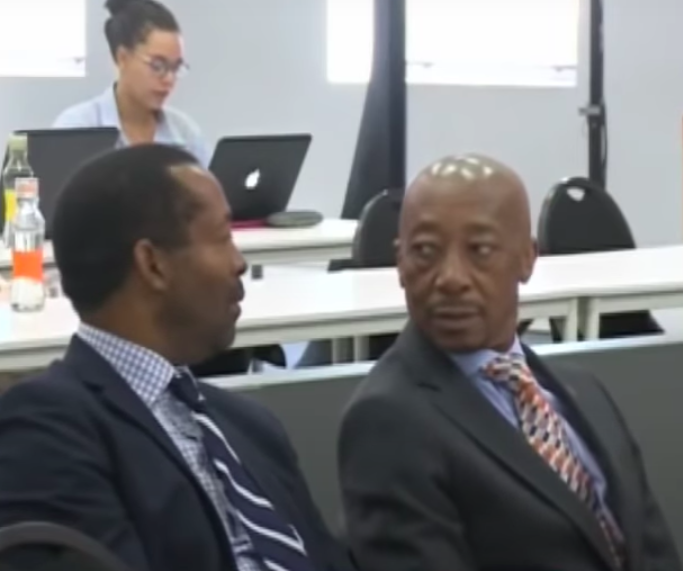
- Former SARS Commissioner Tom Moyane at the Zondo Commission in March 2019
- Born: January 31, 1953 (age 73); Soweto, Johannesburg
- Occupation: Economist

Thomas Moyane (born 31 January 1953) is a South African development economist and former commissioner of the South African Revenue Service (SARS).

== Early life and career ==
Moyane was born in 1953 in Soweto, a township outside Johannesburg. His father was a Mozambican immigrant who worked on the mines. After finishing high school, Moyane worked as a clerk before moving to Turfloop to attend the University of the North on a bursary. He returned to Soweto in June 1976, when the university was closed amid the Soweto uprising; he was detained and tortured by apartheid police in the ensuing state crackdown, and soon afterwards he went into exile in Mozambique. He joined the African National Congress (ANC), where he was known by the nom de guerre Tommy Ndhlela, Ndhlela being his mother's maiden name.

During his exile he worked for government departments in Mozambique and Guinea-Bissau. After obtaining a BSc in Economics from the Eduardo Mondlane University in Mozambique, he served as national commissioner of the Department of Correctional Services and chief executive of the Government Printing Works. He had also been an advisor to the State Information Technology Agency.

== SARS Commissioner ==
Moyane was appointed chief tax collector in September 2014. During his tenure, Moyane had been heavily criticised for his financial management of SARS and his treatment of a controversial investigation that saw the departure of 55 senior staff and managers from the organisation. The 2017 book The President's Keepers claimed that Moyane's predecessor had begged South African President Jacob Zuma to submit tax returns before Zuma appointed Moyane, and described Moyane as a crony of Zuma. SARS rejected the allegations in the book, threatened to sue its author and lay criminal charges on the disclosure of confidential taxpayer information.

These allegations and investigations led to his suspension on 19 March 2018 by South Africa's president Cyril Ramaphosa, who cited a need to "restore the credibility of SARS without delay" after Moyane's leadership compromised the organisational and financial position of SARS. The suspension was enacted after Moyane had refused to step down voluntarily. He was eventually fired on 1 November 2018 by President Cyril Ramaphosa on the recommendation of the SARS commission of inquiry's chair, retired judge Robert Nugent.

After his firing Moyane launched a "marathon" legal battle to get his job back. After the North Gauteng High court on 11 December upheld his dismissal, the Constitutional Court dismissed Moyane's plea on 4 February as well, arguing that it "bears no reasonable prospect for success".

On January 4, 2022, Part 1 of the Zondo Commission Report on state capture was published. The report recommended that Moyane be charged with perjury for lying and providing false information to parliament in relation to his activities at SARS.
