= I Am an African =

1996 speech by Thabo Mbeki

"I Am an African" was a speech made by Thabo Mbeki on behalf of the African National Congress in Cape Town on 8 May 1996, on the occasion of the passing of the new Constitution of South Africa. At the time Mbeki was the Deputy President of South Africa under the presidency of Nelson Mandela. The speech defined the political mood of the moment in post-Apartheid South Africa and enhanced Mbeki's reputation as a political orator, in which respect he has been likened to Martin Luther King Jr.
