= National Budget of South Africa =

Budget of the South African Government

2026 South African National Budget
Budget Review 2026 (RP05/2026)
- Presented: 25 February 2026
- Passed: 24 March 2026
- Parliament: 28th South African Parliament
- Finance minister: Enoch Godongwana
- Total revenue: ▲R 2.35 trillion
- Total expenditures: ▲R 2.67 trillion
- Program spending: ▲R 2.23 trillion
- Debt payment: R 432 billion
- Deficit: R 324 billion
- Debt: ▲78.9% of GDP
- GDP: ▲R 7.60 trillion (2025)
- Website: www.treasury.gov.za

The National Budget of South Africa is the annual financial plan presented by the Minister of Finance to Parliament. It outlines how the government expects to raise revenue and how that money will be allocated across departments and programs for the coming financial year. The budget is built on national priorities set through medium term planning. Revenue comes mainly from taxes, including personal income tax, corporate income tax, and value added tax. Spending areas include education, health, social development, and economic development. The National Treasury prepares the budget and monitors its implementation throughout the year.

== National Budget ==
=== Budget Revenue ===
2026–27 Budget revenue overview
1. (36.0%) Personal income tax: R 844.8 bn
2. (22.2%) VAT: R 521.4 bn
3. (15.5%) Corporate income tax: R 364.3 bn
4. (3.79%) Trade & Tariffs: R 89 bn
5. (13.1%) Other taxes: R 307.5 bn
6. (9.31%) Non-tax revenue: R 218.4 bn

Consolidated Budget Revenue (R billion)
| Fiscal Year | 2017–18 | 2018–19 | 2019–20 | 2020–21 | 2021–22 | 2022–23 | 2023–24 | 2024–25 | 2025–26 | 2026–27 |
|---|---|---|---|---|---|---|---|---|---|---|
| Personal income tax | 482.1 | 505.8 | 552.9 | 546.8 | 516.0 | 587.9 | 640.3 | 738.7 | 792.5 | 844.8 |
| VAT | 312.8 | 348.1 | 360.5 | 360.6 | 370.2 | 439.7 | 471.5 | 476.7 | 482.2 | 521.4 |
| Corporate income tax | 218.7 | 231.2 | 229.6 | 230.2 | 213.1 | 269.9 | 336.1 | 302.7 | 338.8 | 364.3 |
| Trade & Tariffs | 53.6 | 54.1 | 61.3 | 60.6 | 54.0 | 62.5 | 76.6 | 78.7 | 84.2 | 89.0 |
| Other taxes | 198.3 | 205.8 | 217.9 | 227.2 | 211.8 | 238.4 | 263.0 | 266.2 | 287.9 | 307.5 |
| Non-tax revenue | 148.6 | 145.7 | 161.6 | 158.5 | 155.3 | 172.2 | 171.4 | 173.6 | 215.2 | 218.4 |
| Total | 1414.1 | 1490.7 | 1583.8 | 1583.9 | 1520.4 | 1770.6 | 1958.9 | 2036.6 | 2200.8 | 2345.4 |

=== Expenditure Overview ===
Consolidated Government Expenditure (R billion)
| Fiscal Year | | 2017–18 | 2018–19 | 2019–20 | 2020–21 | 2021–22 | 2022–23 | 2023–24 | 2024–25 | 2025–26 | 2026–27 |
|---|---|---|---|---|---|---|---|---|---|---|---|
| Economic Development | Economic infrastructure and regulation | 89.5 | 97.9 | 101.3 | 105.3 | 93.1 | 117.5 | 124.9 | 146.1 | 175.5 | 164.1 |
| Economic Development | Industrialisation and trade | 28.9 | 32.9 | 37.5 | 39.0 | 36.2 | 39.2 | 40.5 | 39.1 | 40.8 | 45.8 |
| Economic Development | Employment and labour | 75.9 | 23.3 | 23.2 | 22.4 | 33.4 | 27.5 | 24.6 | 22.2 | 23.7 | 13.2 |
| Economic Development | Agriculture and rural development | 26.5 | 30.2 | 30.7 | 28.3 | 27.4 | 24.8 | 27.8 | 27.7 | 29.4 | 39.5 |
| Economic Development | Innovation, science and technology | 20.6 | 15.8 | 16.5 | 16.4 | 17.4 | 18.1 | 19.8 | 20.7 | 20.2 | 21.3 |
| Economic Development | Total | 241.6 | 200.1 | 209.2 | 211.5 | 207.5 | 227.1 | 237.6 | 255.4 | 289.8 | 283.9 |
| Defence & Security | Police services | 93.8 | 99.1 | 104.2 | 106.1 | 104.6 | 110.2 | 112.1 | 125.0 | 133.4 | 140.1 |
| Defence & Security | Defence and state security | 54.0 | 48.4 | 50.0 | 51.4 | 48.5 | 50.8 | 52.7 | 54.4 | 59.7 | 59.3 |
| Defence & Security | Law courts and prisons | 43.8 | 45.4 | 48.4 | 49.6 | 46.7 | 50.0 | 51.4 | 53.5 | 57.2 | 60.9 |
| Defence & Security | Home affairs | 7.2 | 7.9 | 8.4 | 9.9 | 8.9 | 9.7 | 11.1 | 11.1 | 12.9 | 14.3 |
| Defence & Security | Total | 198.7 | 200.8 | 211.0 | 217.0 | 208.6 | 220.7 | 227.3 | 244.0 | 263.2 | 274.6 |
| Governance | Public administration and fiscal affairs | 43.9 | 40.4 | 41.6 | 47.3 | 46.1 | 46.1 | 48.1 | 49.1 | 53.7 | 55.4 |
| Governance | Executive and legislative organs | 14.3 | 16.0 | 16.2 | 14.6 | 14.5 | 14.8 | 16.8 | 17.0 | 17.8 | 19.8 |
| Governance | External affairs | 12.4 | 7.6 | 7.6 | 8.2 | 7.9 | 8.3 | 8.4 | 8.5 | 9.1 | 9.2 |
| Governance | Total | 70.7 | 64.0 | 65.3 | 70.0 | 68.4 | 69.2 | 73.6 | 74.7 | 80.7 | 84.4 |
| Education & Culture | Basic education | 216.7 | 230.4 | 250.4 | 248.6 | 255.1 | 282.8 | 293.7 | 303.0 | 329.2 | 344.7 |
| Education & Culture | University transfers | 31.6 | 34.9 | 37.0 | 44.8 | 45.6 | 48.7 | 45.1 | 47.7 | 48.4 | 50.5 |
| Education & Culture | NSFAS | 15.3 | 22.8 | 33.3 | 37.1 | 37.3 | 46.1 | 50.1 | 53.6 | 55.4 | 54.3 |
| Education & Culture | Skills development levy institutions | 21.1 | 19.3 | 21.7 | 21.0 | 21.3 | 21.7 | 24.3 | 28.6 | 27.9 | 30.1 |
| Education & Culture | Education administration | 15.8 | 16.8 | 17.6 | 17.8 | 19.6 | 18.0 | 18.5 | 19.4 | 21.6 | 22.7 |
| Education & Culture | Technical & Vocational education and training | 7.4 | 10.7 | 12.7 | 13.4 | 13.0 | 12.6 | 13.3 | 13.6 | 14.2 | 15.0 |
| Education & Culture | Arts, Sports, Recreation and Culture | 10.4 | 10.7 | 11.3 | 11.7 | 11.0 | 11.8 | 12.0 | 12.1 | 12.5 | 12.9 |
| Education & Culture | Total | 320.5 | 351.1 | 386.4 | 396.4 | 402.9 | 441.5 | 457.1 | 480.6 | 505.6 | 527.2 |
| Health | District health services | 83.6 | 90.2 | 98.2 | 102.0 | 105.5 | 115.7 | 113.1 | 120.0 | 130.9 | 137.8 |
| Health | Central hospital services | 35.9 | 38.6 | 43.1 | 44.7 | 51.4 | 49.4 | 48.6 | 52.8 | 57.8 | 59.7 |
| Health | Provincial hospital services | 32.3 | 34.3 | 36.7 | 37.6 | 44.1 | 42.4 | 40.2 | 47.5 | 48.5 | 50.6 |
| Health | Other health services | 25.8 | 33.8 | 35.6 | 35.4 | 38.1 | 40.4 | 46.1 | 40.2 | 47.1 | 50.5 |
| Health | Facilities management and maintenance | 9.9 | 8.5 | 8.8 | 10.1 | 9.7 | 11.1 | 11.3 | 11.3 | 11.9 | 11.8 |
| Health | Total | 187.5 | 205.4 | 222.6 | 229.7 | 248.8 | 259.0 | 259.2 | 271.9 | 296.1 | 310.4 |
| Local Development & Infrastructure | Municipal equitable share | 72.9 | 62.7 | 69.0 | 74.7 | 78.0 | 87.3 | 96.5 | 101.2 | 106.1 | 110.1 |
| Local Development & Infrastructure | Human settlements, water and electrification programmes | 52.8 | 56.5 | 56.4 | 55.7 | 52.9 | 58.7 | 61.7 | 59.0 | 58.0 | 53.6 |
| Local Development & Infrastructure | Public transport | 44.1 | 38.6 | 43.6 | 44.7 | 45.0 | 47.4 | 53.2 | 57.2 | 63.8 | 70.9 |
| Local Development & Infrastructure | Other human settlements and Municipal infrastructure | 26.0 | 38.5 | 39.6 | 37.2 | 42.9 | 42.9 | 48.2 | 47.7 | 52.6 | 59.6 |
| Local Development & Infrastructure | Total | 195.8 | 196.3 | 208.5 | 212.3 | 218.8 | 236.3 | 259.7 | 265.3 | 280.4 | 294.3 |
| Social Development | Social security funds | | 66.0 | 71.3 | 88.0 | 105.9 | 84.2 | 92.4 | 89.0 | 99.5 | 107.6 |
| Social Development | Old-age grant | 64.5 | 70.5 | 77.0 | 83.1 | 86.5 | 92.1 | 99.1 | 107.0 | 117.4 | 121.8 |
| Social Development | Child-support grant | 56.3 | 60.6 | 65.0 | 69.8 | 73.3 | 77.2 | 81.9 | 85.8 | 90.4 | 89.0 |
| Social Development | Provincial social development | 19.2 | 20.6 | 22.3 | 23.3 | 23.6 | 22.0 | 21.4 | 22.0 | 23.3 | 24.3 |
| Social Development | Disability grant | 21.2 | 22.1 | 23.1 | 24.4 | 23.6 | 24.7 | 26.8 | 29.2 | 30.2 | 31.9 |
| Social Development | Other grants | 10.7 | 9.7 | 10.1 | 10.6 | 12.2 | 54.3 | 46.0 | 44.2 | 46.7 | 58.6 |
| Social Development | Policy oversight and grant administration | 8.3 | 9.8 | 9.6 | 10.0 | 10.2 | 9.9 | 10.9 | 10.1 | 12.6 | 13.4 |
| Social Development | Total | 180.0 | 259.4 | 278.4 | 309.2 | 335.3 | 364.4 | 378.5 | 387.3 | 420.1 | 446.6 |
| Debt-service costs | | 162.4 | 180.1 | 202.2 | 229.3 | 269.7 | 301.8 | 340.5 | 382.2 | 426.3 | 432.4 |
| Contingency reserve | | 6.0 | 8.0 | 13.0 | 5.0 | 12.0 | 10.0 | 5.0 | 5.0 | 5.0 | 5.0 |

== Provincial Budgets ==
FY 2025/26 Budget Overview by Province (R 000)
| Sector | Province | | | | | | | | |
| Sector | Eastern Cape | Free State | Gauteng | Kwazulu-Natal | Limpopo | Mpumalanga | North West | Northern Cape | Western Cape |
|---|---|---|---|---|---|---|---|---|---|
| Agriculture | 2,577,809 | 883,720 | 647,304 | 2,757,443 | 1,909,803 | 1,644,634 | 1,218,610 | 793,016 | 1,021,484 |
| Economic Development, Tourism and the Environment | 1,815,756 | 705,641 | 2,223,973 | 3,606,998 | 2,079,629 | 1,324,261 | 1,013,489 | 340,394 | 1,184,949 |
| Education | 44,636,479 | 18,889,391 | 68,000,575 | 66,690,206 | 42,529,435 | 28,732,641 | 22,894,639 | 8,886,543 | 33,259,103 |
| Health | 31,652,682 | 14,187,504 | 67,042,497 | 56,211,801 | 26,073,702 | 19,750,974 | 17,040,332 | 6,868,747 | 32,007,601 |
| Local Government and Housing | 3,535,562 | 1,726,680 | 6,280,116 | 5,481,030 | 2,573,445 | 2,360,127 | 2,529,739 | 1,068,064 | 10,267,651 |
| Office of the Premier | 1,519,072 | 633,571 | 1,505,486 | 817,875 | 554,810 | 493,827 | 519,498 | 302,262 | 2,012,784 |
| Provincial Legislature | 750,510 | 317,306 | 1,200,122 | 850,796 | 671,660 | 549,137 | 522,583 | 222,825 | 269,189 |
| Provincial Treasury | 519,185 | 384,032 | 787,853 | 710,190 | 512,897 | 647,494 | 695,181 | 373,638 | 359,755 |
| Public Works, Roads and Transport | 8,797,777 | 6,088,777 | 17,288,201 | 16,140,272 | 8,651,421 | 8,021,174 | 6,653,848 | 2,723,605 | 3,976,946 |
| Social Development | 3,115,648 | 1,373,855 | 5,458,504 | 3,613,297 | 2,294,866 | 1,877,527 | 1,876,413 | 1,002,757 | 2,725,610 |
| Sport, Arts and Culture | 1,079,768 | 666,075 | 1,013,402 | 1,598,141 | 877,492 | 812,298 | 776,063 | 457,814 | 958,692 |
| Total | 100,000,249 | 45,856,552 | 171,448,033 | 158,478,049 | 88,729,158 | 66,214,094 | 55,740,395 | 23,039,665 | 88,043,764 |

== See also ==
- Economy Of South Africa
- Government of South Africa
- National Debt of South Africa
