= List of judgments of the Constitutional Court of South Africa delivered in 2011 =

The table below lists the judgments of the Constitutional Court of South Africa delivered in 2011.

The members of the court at the start of 2011 were Chief Justice Sandile Ngcobo, Deputy Chief Justice Dikgang Moseneke, and judges Edwin Cameron, Johan Froneman, Chris Jafta, Sisi Khampepe, Mogoeng Mogoeng, Bess Nkabinde, Thembile Skweyiya, Johann van der Westhuizen and Zak Yacoob. Chief Justice Ngcobo retired in August and Justice Mogoeng was elevated to the post of Chief Justice. The vacant seat was not filled during the year.

| Citation | Case name | Heard | Decided | Majority author |
|---|---|---|---|---|
| [2011] ZACC 1 | Mvumvu and Others v Minister of Transport and Another | 4 November 2010 | 17 February 2011 | Jafta |
| [2011] ZACC 2 | Twee Jonge Gezellen (Pty) Ltd and Another v Land and Agricultural Development Bank of South Africa t/a The Land Bank and Another | 18 November 2010 | 22 February 2011 | Brand (acting) |
| [2011] ZACC 3 | Mankayi v AngloGold Ashanti Ltd | 17 August 2010 | 3 March 2011 | Khampepe |
| [2011] ZACC 4 | Le Roux and Others v Dey | 26 August 2010 | 8 March 2011 | Brand (acting) |
| [2011] ZACC 5 | Viking Pony Africa Pumps (Pty) Ltd t/a Tricom Africa v Hydro-Tech Systems (Pty) Ltd and Another (costs) | | 10 March 2011 | Mogoeng |
| [2011] ZACC 6 | Glenister v President of the Republic of South Africa and Others | 2 September 2010 | 17 March 2011 | Moseneke and Cameron |
| [2011] ZACC 7 | S v S | 9 November 2010 | 29 March 2011 | Cameron |
| [2011] ZACC 8 | Residents of Joe Slovo Community, Western Cape v Thubelisha Homes and Others (discharge of order) | | 31 March 2011 | The Court |
| [2011] ZACC 9 | Minister for Correctional Services and Another v Van Vuren and Another, in re: Van Vuren v Minister for Correctional Services and Others | | 31 March 2011 | The Court |
| [2011] ZACC 10 | HBR (Hola Bon Renaissance) Foundation v President of the Republic of South Africa and Others | | 31 March 2011 | The Court |
| [2011] ZACC 11 | The Citizen 1978 (Pty) Ltd and Others v McBride | 30 September 2010 | 8 April 2011 | Cameron |
| [2011] ZACC 12 | Cherangani Trade & Invest 107 (Pty) Ltd v Mason and Others | 15 March 2011 | 8 April 2011 | Yacoob |
| [2011] ZACC 13 | Governing Body of the Juma Musjid Primary School & Others v Essay NO and Others | 31 August and 25 November 2010 | 11 April 2011 | Nkabinde |
| [2011] ZACC 14 | Gundwana v Steko Development CC and Others | 10 February 2011 | 11 April 2011 | Froneman |
| [2011] ZACC 15 | Baphalane ba Ramokoka Community v Mphela Family and Others, in re: Mphela Family and Others v Haakdoornbult Boerdery CC and Others | 22 February 2011 | 21 April 2011 | Cameron |
| [2011] ZACC 16 | Electoral Commission of the Republic of South Africa v Inkatha Freedom Party | 6 May 2011 | 10 May 2011 | Ngcobo |
| [2011] ZACC 17 | De Lacy and Another v South African Post Office | 8 February 2011 | 24 May 2011 | Moseneke |
| [2011] ZACC 18 | Qhinga and Others v S | 17 February 2011 | 25 May 2011 | Mthiyane (acting) |
| [2011] ZACC 19 | Minister for Safety and Security v Van der Merwe and Others | 3 March 2011 | 7 June 2011 | Mogoeng |
| [2011] ZACC 20 | Stainbank v South African Apartheid Museum at Freedom Park and Another | 15 February 2010 | 9 June 2011 | Khampepe |
| [2011] ZACC 21 | South African Police Service v Police and Prisons Civil Rights Union and Another | 1 March 2011 | 9 June 2011 | Nkabinde |
| [2011] ZACC 22 | S and Another v Acting Regional Magistrate, Boksburg and Another | 12 May 2011 | 14 June 2011 | Mthiyane (acting) |
| [2011] ZACC 23 | Justice Alliance of South Africa v President of the Republic of South Africa and Others, Freedom Under Law v President of the Republic of South Africa and Others, Centre for Applied Legal Studies and Another v President of the Republic of South Africa and Others | 18 July 2011 | 29 July 2011 | The Court |
| [2011] ZACC 24 | Naidoo and Others v National Director of Public Prosecutions and Another | 24 May 2011 | 10 August 2011 | Cameron |
| [2011] ZACC 25 | Premier: Limpopo Province v Speaker: Limpopo Provincial Legislature and Others | 24 February 2011 | 11 August 2011 | Ngcobo |
| [2011] ZACC 26 | Falk and Another v National Director of Public Prosecutions | 8 March 2011 | 16 August 2011 | Van der Westhuizen |
| [2011] ZACC 27 | Moutse Demarcation Forum and Others v President of the Republic of South Africa and Others | 10 March 2011 | 23 August 2011 | Jafta |
| [2011] ZACC 28 | Haffejee NO and Others v eThekwini Municipality and Others | 19 May 2011 | 25 August 2011 | Froneman |
| [2011] ZACC 29 | Hlophe v Premier of the Western Cape; Hlophe v Freedom Under Law and Others (postponement) | | 29 September 2011 | The Court |
| [2011] ZACC 30 | Everfresh Market Virginia (Pty) Ltd v Shoprite Checkers (Pty) Ltd | 10 May 2011 | 17 November 2011 | Moseneke |
| [2011] ZACC 39 | Aviation Union of South Africa and Another v South African Airways (Pty) Ltd and Others | 11 May 2011 | 24 November 2011 | Yacoob |
| [2011] ZACC 32 | President of the Republic of South Africa and Others v M & G Media Ltd | 17 May 2011 | 29 November 2011 | Ngcobo |
| [2011] ZACC 33 | City of Johannesburg Metropolitan Municipality v Blue Moonlight Properties 39 (Pty) Ltd and Another | 11 August 2011 | 1 December 2011 | Van der Westhuizen |
| [2011] ZACC 34 | Pheko and Others v Ekurhuleni Metropolitan Municipality | 15 September 2011 | 6 December 2011 | Nkabinde |
| [2011] ZACC 35 | Occupiers of Portion R25 of the Farm Mooipaats 355 JR v Golden Thread Ltd and Others | 13 September 2011 | 7 December 2011 | Yacoob |
| [2011] ZACC 36 | Occupiers of Skurweplaas 353 JR v PPC Aggregate Quarries (Pty) Ltd and Others | 13 September 2011 | 7 December 2011 | Yacoob |
| [2011] ZACC 37 | F v Minister of Safety and Security and Another | 4 August 2011 | 15 December 2011 | Mogoeng |
