= List of Constitutional Court opinions of Dikgang Moseneke =

Dikgang Moseneke served in the Constitutional Court of South Africa from his appointment on 29 November 2002 until his retirement on 20 May 2016.

== Majority opinions ==
No.	Case name	Citation	Year	Notes
1	Fourie v Minister of Home Affairs	[2003] ZACC 11	2003	Unanimous.
2	Thebus v S	[2003] ZACC 12	2003	
3	S v Basson	[2004] ZACC 13	2004	Co-written with Ackermann, Madala, Mokgoro, Ngcobo and O'Regan JJ.
4	Minister of Finance v Van Heerden	[2004] ZACC 3	2004	
5	City of Cape Town v Robertson	[2004] ZACC 21	2004	Unanimous.
6	Laugh It Off Promotions v South African Breweries International	[2005] ZACC 7	2005	Unanimous.
7	Van der Merwe v Road Accident Fund	[2006] ZACC 4	2006	Unanimous.
8	Dikoko v Mokhatla	[2006] ZACC 10	2006	
9	Steenkamp v Provincial Tender Board, Eastern Cape	[2006] ZACC 16	2006	
10	Mohunram v National Director of Public Prosecutions	[2007] ZACC 4	2007	
11	Department of Land Affairs v Goedgelegen Tropical Fruits	[2007] ZACC 12	2007	Unanimous.
12	Van Der Merwe v Taylor	[2007] ZACC 16	2007	Co-written with Nkabinde J.
13	Masetlha v President	[2007] ZACC 20	2007	
14	Independent Newspapers v Minister for Intelligence Services	[2008] ZACC 6	2008	
15	Gumede v President	[2008] ZACC 23	2008	Unanimous.
16	Von Abo v President	[2009] ZACC 15	2009	Unanimous.
17	Abahlali baseMjondolo Movement SA v Premier of Kwazulu-Natal	[2009] ZACC 31	2009	
18	Head of Department, Mpumalanga Department of Education v Hoërskool Ermelo	[2009] ZACC 32	2009	Unanimous.
19	International Trade Administration Commission v SCAW South Africa	[2010] ZACC 6	2010	Unanimous.
20	Law Society of South Africa v Minister for Transport	[2010] ZACC 25	2010	Unanimous.
21	Glenister v President	[2011] ZACC 6	2011	Co-written with Cameron J.
22	De Lacy v South African Post Office	[2011] ZACC 17	2011	Unanimous.
23	Everfresh Market Virginia v Shoprite Checkers	[2011] ZACC 30	2011	
24	National Treasury v Opposition to Urban Tolling Alliance	[2012] ZACC 18	2012	
25	Ramakatsa v Magashule	[2012] ZACC 31	2012	Co-written with Jafta J.
26	Kwalindile Community v King Sabata Dalinyebo Municipality	[2013] ZACC 6	2013	Unanimous.
27	Mazibuko v Sisulu	[2013] ZACC 28	2013	
28	Minister of Police v Premier of the Western Cape	[2013] ZACC 33	2013	Unanimous.
29	Ferris v Firstrand Bank Limited	[2013] ZACC 46	2013	Unanimous.
30	Director-General Department of Home Affairs v Mukhamadiva	[2013] ZACC 47	2013	Unanimous.
31	South African Informal Traders Forum v City of Johannesburg	[2014] ZACC 8	2014	Unanimous.
32	Florence v Government	[2014] ZACC 22	2014	
33	South African Police Service v Solidarity	[2014] ZACC 23	2014	
34	Arun Property Development v City of Cape Town	[2014] ZACC 37	2014	Unanimous.
35	South African Reserve Bank v Shuttleworth	[2015] ZACC 17	2015	
36	FEDSAS v Member of the Executive Council for Education, Gauteng	[2016] ZACC 14	2016	Unanimous.
37	Gbenga-Oluwatoye v Reckitt Benckiser South Africa	[2016] ZACC 33	2016	Co-written with Cameron J; unanimous.
