= List of judgments of the Constitutional Court of South Africa delivered in 2010 =

The table below lists the judgments of the Constitutional Court of South Africa delivered in 2010.

The members of the court during 2010 were Chief Justice Sandile Ngcobo, Deputy Chief Justice Dikgang Moseneke, and judges Edwin Cameron, Johan Froneman, Chris Jafta, Sisi Khampepe, Mogoeng Mogoeng, Bess Nkabinde, Thembile Skweyiya, Johann van der Westhuizen and Zak Yacoob.

Citation	Case name	Heard	Decided	Majority author
[2010] ZACC 1	Hennie De Beer Game Lodge CC v Waterbok Bosveld Plaas CC and Another		4 February 2010	The Court
[2010] ZACC 2	Moloi and Others v Minister for Justice and Constitutional Development and Others		4 February 2010	The Court
[2010] ZACC 3	Billiton Aluminium SA Ltd t/a Hillside Aluminium v Khanyile and Others	29 November 2009	18 February 2010	Froneman
[2010] ZACC 4	Albutt v Centre for the Study of Violence and Reconciliation and Others	10 November 2009	23 February 2010	Ngcobo
[2010] ZACC 5	Poverty Alleviation Network and Others v President of the Republic of South Africa and Others	3 November 2009	24 February 2010	Nkabinde
[2010] ZACC 6	International Trade Administration Commission v SCAW South Africa (Pty) Ltd	12 November 2009	9 March 2010	Moseneke
[2010] ZACC 7	Chonco and Others v President of the Republic of South Africa ("Chonco 2")	4 February 2010	16 March 2010	Khampepe
[2010] ZACC 8	Mthembu v S		25 March 2010	The Court
[2010] ZACC 9	Minister for Justice and Constitutional Development v Chonco and Others ("Chonco 3")		8 April 2010	The Court
[2010] ZACC 10	Tongoane and Others v National Minister for Agriculture and Land Affairs and Others	2 March 2010	11 May 2010	Ngcobo
[2010] ZACC 11	City of Johannesburg Metropolitan Municipality v Gauteng Development Tribunal and Others	24 February 2010	18 June 2010	Jafta
[2010] ZACC 12	S v Thunzi and Another	16 February 2010	5 August 2010	Skweyiya
[2010] ZACC 13	Malachi v Cape Dance Academy International (Pty) Ltd and Others	25 March 2010	24 August 2010	Mogoeng
[2010] ZACC 14	Stuttafords Stores (Pty) Ltd and Others v Salt of the Earth Creations (Pty) Ltd and Others		2 September 2010	The Court
[2010] ZACC 15	Greenfields Drilling CC and Others v Registrar of the Supreme Court of Appeal and Others		7 September 2010	The Court
[2010] ZACC 16	S v Marais		21 September 2010	The Court
[2010] ZACC 17	Van Vuren v Minister of Correctional Services and Others	6 May 2010	30 September 2010	Nkabinde
[2010] ZACC 18	Road Accident Fund and Another v Mdeyide	11 May 2010	30 September 2010	Van der Westhuizen
[2010] ZACC 19	Camps Bay Ratepayers' and Residents' Association and Another v Harrison and Another	5 August 2010	4 November 2010	Brand (acting)
[2010] ZACC 20	Offit Enterprises (Pty) Ltd and Another v Coega Development Corporation (Pty) Ltd and Others	3 August 2010	18 November 2010	Skweyiya
[2010] ZACC 21	Viking Pony Africa Pumps (Pty) Ltd t/a Tricom Africa v Hidro-Tech Systems (Pty) Ltd and Another	10 August 2010	23 November 2010	Mogoeng
[2010] ZACC 22	Zwane and Others v Alert Fencing Contractors CC		23 November 2010	The Court
[2010] ZACC 23	Betlane v Shelly Court CC	24 August 2010	24 November 2010	Mogoeng
[2010] ZACC 24	Malachi v Cape Dance Academy International (Pty) Ltd and Others (order for costs)		25 November 2010	Mogoeng
[2010] ZACC 25	Law Society of South Africa and Others v Minister for Transport and Another	12 August 2010	25 November 2010	Moseneke
[2010] ZACC 26	Bengwenyama Minerals (Pty) Ltd and Others v Genorah Resources (Pty) Ltd and Others	7 September 2010	30 November 2010	Froneman
[2010] ZACC 27	S v Thunzi and Another	11 November 2010	2 December 2010	Froneman
[2010] ZACC 28	Bernert v Absa Bank Ltd	19 August 2010	9 December 2010	Ngcobo
