= Glenister v President =

Glenister v President may refer to any of a series of cases decided in the Constitutional Court of South Africa:

- Glenister v President of the Republic of South Africa and Others (2008) – Glenister I
- Glenister v President of the Republic of South Africa and Others (2011) – Glenister II
- Glenister v President of the Republic of South Africa and Others (2013) – costs in Glenister II
- Helen Suzman Foundation v President of the Republic of South Africa and Others; Glenister v President of the Republic of South Africa and Others (2014) – Glenister III
