= Glenister v President (2008) =

South African legal case

- Court: Constitutional Court of South Africa
- Full case name: Glenister v President of the Republic of South Africa and Others
- Decided: 22 October 2008
- Docket nos.: CCT 41/08
- Citations: [2008] ZACC 19; 2009 (1) SA 287 (CC); 2009 (2) BCLR 136 (CC)

Case history
- Prior actions: Glenister v President of the Republic of South Africa and Others [2008] ZAGPHC 143 in the High Court of South Africa, Transvaal Provincial Division

Court membership
- Judges sitting: Langa DCJ, Moseneke DJC, Madala J, Mokgoro J, Ngcobo J, O’Regan J, Sachs J, van der Westhuizen J, and Yacoob J

Case opinions
- Courts may not intervene in a pending legislative process unless the absence of intervention would result in material and irreversible harm that could not be remedied once the legislation has been enacted.
- Decision by: Langa CJ (unanimous)

Glenister v President of the Republic of South Africa and Others, often known as Glenister I, is a 2008 decision of the Constitutional Court of South Africa on the separation of powers and the scope of judicial review. The Constitutional Court unanimously dismissed an application by businessman Hugh Glenister, who challenged Cabinet's decision to introduce draft legislation that would disband the Scorpions.

In his judgment, handed down on 22 October 2008, Chief Justice Pius Langa held that judicial intervention in pending legislation is not appropriate except in exceptional cases in which immediate intervention is required to prevent material and irreversible harm.

== Background ==
The Directorate of Special Operations, commonly known as the Scorpions, was an elite multi-disciplinary unit located within the National Prosecuting Authority (NPA) and mandated to investigate high-level and priority crimes, including organised crime and political corruption. In December 2007, in the aftermath of a series of high-profile investigations into politicians, South Africa's governing party, the African National Congress (ANC), passed a policy resolution under which its 52nd National Conference held that the Scorpions should be disbanded and incorporated into the South African Police Service (SAPS).

In February 2008, the Minister of Safety and Security, Charles Nqakula, announced that the government would seek to implement the ANC resolution. In April, Cabinet approved draft legislation which would amalgamate the Scorpions into the SAPS; the bills were the National Prosecuting Authority Amendment Bill of 2008, an amendment to the National Prosecuting Authority Act of 1998, and the General Law Amendment Bill of 2008, subsequently renamed the South African Police Service Amendment Bill of 2008. This policy was extremely controversial and was opposed publicly by a number of opposition parties. However, because the ANC had won a supermajority in the 2004 general election, opposition parties had little legislative recourse to oppose the amendments in the Parliament of South Africa.

== Court action ==
=== High Court ===
In March 2008, Hugh Glenister, a retired businessman, approached the High Court of South Africa on an urgent basis, seeking to challenge the government's policy. He said in a public statement that he was acting as "a concerned citizen". Because the bills had not yet been finalised, he initially sought a final order, alternatively an interim order, interdicting the President, the Minister of Safety and Security (custodian of the SAPS), and the Minister of Justice and Constitutional Development (custodian of the NPA) from initiating legislation to disband the Scorpions. Once Cabinet approved the draft legislation in April, Glenister amended his notice of motion to seek an order interdicting the respondents "from persisting with the passage of legislation" to disband the Scorpions. Five opposition parties – the African Christian Democratic Party, the Democratic Alliance, the Independent Democrats, the Inkatha Freedom Party, and the United Democratic Movement (UDM) – were admitted as amici curiae and supported Glenister's application.

On 27 May 2008, Judge Willem van der Merwe of the Pretoria High Court dismissed Glenister's application, holding that the High Court lacked jurisdiction to hear it due to separation of powers concerns. However, van der Merwe suggested that the Constitutional Court of South Africa might be competent to consider the matter.

=== Constitutional Court ===
Glenister indeed approached the Constitutional Court, seeking urgent leave to appeal against the High Court's judgment and order. In addition, he applied for direct access to the Constitutional Court to challenge the constitutionality of the decision to initiate the impugned legislation and compel the government to withdraw the legislation. In July 2008, the Constitutional Court agreed to hear the application, but the parties received directions to file argument only on the narrow question of whether it was appropriate for the court to intervene at the current stage of the legislative process – that is, to intervene before the draft legislation had been passed or enacted. In other words, the court sought to decide "whether, in the light of the doctrine of the separation of powers, it is appropriate for this court, in all the circumstances, to make any order setting aside the decision of the national executive that is challenged in this case".

Glenister's application was opposed by the Minister of Safety and Security and the Minister of Justice and Constitutional Development; President Kgalema Motlanthe abided the decision of the court. Of the political parties who had joined the High Court action as amici curiae, only the UDM appeared in the Constitutional Court to support Glenister's application; however, the Centre for Constitutional Rights, a unit of the F. W. de Klerk Foundation, was newly admitted as amicus curiae and broadly supported the arguments of Glenister and the UDM.

== Argument ==
The Constitutional Court heard the matter on 20 August 2008. On the narrow legal question posed by the Constitutional Court, the UDM contended that the separation of powers doctrine should be adapted to the prevailing political conditions, including the ANC's dominance and a putative power imbalance between the branches of government which resulted in the marginalisation of the legislature and the opposition parties therein. Moreover, the UDM argued that Cabinet's decision to initiate the legislation, insofar as it emanated directly from a party-political resolution, amounted to an abdication of constitutional responsibility and therefore stood to be overturned as a violation of the principle of legality.

Meanwhile, Glenister's counsel, David Unterhalter, relied on the court's remarks in Doctors for Life v Speaker, an earlier judgment on the separation of powers, to argue that there are exceptional cases in which an aggrieved litigant should be permitted to challenge a statute before it has been enacted, because effective redress would become impossible after the statute's enactment. In this respect, Glenister pointed to evidence that many employees had resigned or planned to resign from the Scorpions as a result of the initiation of the draft legislation, thus substantially undermining the unit's capacity.

== Judgment ==
On 22 October 2008, delivering judgment on behalf of a unanimous court, Chief Justice Pius Langa dismissed Glenister's application on the basis that it shared the High Court's separation of powers concerns. The court was willing to accept, "for the purposes of argument", Glenister's contention that courts are permitted to intervene in pending legislation in exceptional circumstances. However, were this contention true, it would permit such intervention only in an extraordinarily narrow range of cases. In particular, the minimum test for intervention is the requirement that the applicant:

can show that there would be no effective remedy available to him or her once the legislative process is complete, as the unlawful conduct will have achieved its object in the course of the process. The applicant must show that the resultant harm will be material and irreversible.

According to Langa, this test, borrowed from Rediffusion (Hong Kong) Ltd v Attorney-General of Hong Kong, a 1970 decision of the Privy Council, accords proper respect to the separation of powers. In doing so, it places "a formidable burden" on the applicant seeking intervention:

Cases that would warrant intervention on this approach will be extremely rare. As acknowledged in an Australian case, Cormack v Cope, it is not the introduction of a Bill that affects rights; it is the making of a law that does that. Thus, before the law has been enacted, it would be extremely unusual to be able to demonstrate harm.

The court concluded that this test had not been met in the case of the disputed legislation, because the applicant had not established that material and irreversible harm would result in the absence of intervention. Because judicial intervention was not justifiable in the circumstances, both Glenister's application for leave to appeal and his application for direct access stood to be dismissed.

== Reception and aftermath ==
While the Constitutional Court case was pending, the National Assembly continued to process the draft legislation, and the Speaker of the National Assembly called a vote on the bills for 23 October 2008. Thus, the week before the Constitutional Court judgment was handed down, Glenister lodged a separate urgent application in the Cape High Court seeking to interdict the National Assembly's vote. The High Court dismissed that application the same day that the Constitutional Court dismissed the original application. Glenister's lawyer said that he had known the campaign would be "a long shot". The day after the judgments were handed down, the National Assembly passed the impugned legislation, and two years later, Glenister returned to the Constitutional Court to challenge the enacted legislation's constitutionality in Glenister II.

Theunis Roux later complimented Chief Justice Langa's judgment in Glenister for having "neatly defused the politics of the case" and "taking the political heat out of the questions presented to [the court]".
