= President v M&G Media =

South African legal case

- Court: Constitutional Court of South Africa
- Full case name: President of the Republic of South Africa and Others v M & G Media Ltd
- Decided: 29 November 2011
- Docket nos.: CCT 03/11
- Citations: [2011] ZACC 32; 2012 (2) BCLR 181 (CC); 2012 (2) SA 50 (CC)

Case history
- Prior actions: Supreme Court of Appeal – President v M & G Media [2010] ZASCA 177; High Court of South Africa, North Gauteng Division – M & G Media v President [2010] ZAGPPHC 43
- Subsequent actions: High Court – M & G Media v President [2013] ZAGPPHC 35; Supreme Court of Appeal – President v M & G Media [2014] ZASCA 124

Court membership
- Judges sitting: Ngcobo CJ, Cameron J, Froneman J, Jafta J, Mogoeng J, Nkabinde J, van der Westhuizen J, Yacoob J and Mthiyane AJ

Case opinions
- Decision by: Ngcobo CJ (Froneman, Mogoeng, Yacoob and Mthiyane concurring)
- Concurrence: Froneman J
- Concurrence: Yacoob J
- Dissent: Cameron J (Jafta, Nkabinde and van der Westhuizen concurring)

President of the Republic of South Africa and Others v M & G Media Ltd is 2011 decision in South African administrative law. Decided in the Constitutional Court of South Africa, it concerned access to information and the adjudication of disputes under the Promotion of Access to Information Act, 2000.

The matter arose from the Mail & Guardian's campaign to gain access to the Khampepe Report on the 2002 Zimbabwean presidential election. "Surprisingly," instead of confirming the lower courts' order to release the report, a majority of the Constitutional Court remitted the matter to the High Court with an instruction that the court should examine the report in secret and make a fresh determination.

== Background ==
In 2002, President Thabo Mbeki appointed two senior judges – Judges Sisi Khampepe and Dikgang Moseneke – to lead a judicial observer mission to that year's Zimbabwean presidential election, which was hotly contested. After the election, and despite allegations of vote-rigging by Robert Mugabe's ZANU–PF, Mbeki relied on a favourable report from another, larger observer mission in endorsing Mugabe's re-election as valid. Khampepe and Moseneke's report, which came to be known as the Khampepe Report, was submitted to Mbeki but never released to the public. M&G Media Limited, the publisher of the Mail & Guardian newspaper, lodged a request for access to the report in terms of section 11 of the Promotion of Access to Information Act, 2000. The Presidency refused the request, in terms of confidentiality provisions of the Information Act, and M&G launched litigation in the High Court of South Africa.

In 2010, the North Gauteng High Court ruled in M&G's favour, finding that the Information Act did not justify the Presidency's decision and ordering the respondents – the President, his Deputy Information Officer, and the Minister in the Presidency – to release the report to M&G in its entirety. In 2014, in a judgment written by Judge of Appeal Robert Nugent, the Supreme Court of Appeal upheld the High Court's decision, dismissing an appeal by the state. A final appeal was lodged in the Constitutional Court of South Africa, which heard argument on 17 May 2011 and delivered judgment on 29 November 2011. Jeremy Gauntlett represented M&G.

== Majority judgment ==
The court's majority judgment was written by Chief Justice Sandile Ngcobo and joined by Justices Johan Froneman, Mogoeng Mogoeng, and Zak Yacoob, and Acting Justice Kenneth Mthiyane. The majority upheld the state's appeal, setting aside the lower courts' orders. Instead, the matter was remitted to the High Court with the instruction that that court should examine the Khampepe Report in order to determine afresh whether the state was justified in exempting it from disclosure.

Ngcobo traversed the evidentiary difficulties for courts in proceedings under the Information Act, given that – as the state had argued – state respondents would be constrained in delivering evidence about confidential records, while applicants would be constrained in delivering evidence about records that they had not seen. Because of these difficulties, he held that courts are empowered to call for evidence in camera and to examine the contested records in question in order to determine whether the state was justified in claiming an exemption. Courts should exercise this power whenever it is in the interests of justice for them to do so, and the High Court should have exercised it in this case.

Though Justices Froneman and Yacoob concurred in Ngcobo's reasoning and order, each also filed a separate judgment in order to record additional qualifications about the circumstances in which courts should examine contested records.

== Dissenting judgment ==
Justice Edwin Cameron wrote the dissenting judgment, in which Justices Chris Jafta, Bess Nkabinde, and Johann van der Westhuizen joined. This minority would have dismissed the appeal and upheld the lower courts' orders directing the state to release the Khampepe Report in its entirety. More generally, it held that courts should invoke their powers to examine contested records "only where government has laid a plausible foundation for a plea that its hands are tied, or where government has laid a basis for claiming an exemption, but a court considers that doubt exists about its validity".
