= Mankayi v AngloGold Ashanti =

South African legal case

- Court: Constitutional Court of South Africa
- Full case name: Thembekile Mankayi v AngloGold Ashanti Limited
- Decided: 11 March 2011
- Docket nos.: CCT 45/10
- Citations: [2011] ZACC 3; 2011 (5) BCLR 453 (CC); 2011 (3) SA 237 (CC); [2011] 6 BLLR 527 (CC); (2011) 32 ILJ 545 (CC)

Case history
- Prior actions: Supreme Court of Appeal – Mankayi v AngloGold Ashanti [2010] ZASCA 46; High Court of South Africa, South Gauteng Division – Mankayi v AngloGold Ashanti (22312/06) (26 June 2008, unreported)

Court membership
- Judges sitting: Ngcobo CJ, Moseneke DCJ, Cameron J, Froneman J, Khampepe J, Mogoeng J, Nkabinde J, Skweyiya J, Yacoob J and Brand AJ

Case opinions
- Section 35(1) of the Compensation for Occupational Injuries and Diseases Act, 1993 does not extinguish the common-law liability of mine-owners for occupational injury or occupational disease suffered by mineworkers.
- Decision by: Khampepe J (unanimous)
- Concurrence: Froneman J

Mankayi v AngloGold Ashanti Ltd is a 2011 decision of the Constitutional Court of South Africa in South African labour law and the South African law of delict. The court upheld the right of mineworkers to sue at common law for damages incurred due to occupational disease and occupational injury. The High Court and Supreme Court of Appeal had found that section 35(1) of the Compensation for Occupational Injuries and Diseases Act, 1993 established a statutory bar to such claims, but the Constitutional Court held unanimously that the relevant provision applied only to workers who were entitled to claim for compensation under that act.

== Background ==
Thembekile Mankayi worked underground as a mineworker for AngloGold Ashanti between January 1979 and September 1995. He contracted tuberculosis and chronic obstructive airway disease, rendering him unable to work, and he contended that he contracted these illnesses because of his exposure to harmful respirable dust and gases at his AngloGold workplace. In 2004, he received compensation of R16,320 from the public Compensation Commissioner, awarded in terms of the Occupational Diseases in Mines and Works Act, 1973 (ODIMWA).

However, Mankayi also sought compensation from AngloGold. He sued for damages in the High Court of South Africa, claiming about R2.6 million in past and future lost earnings, future medical expenses, and general damages. His claim arose at the common law of delict and consisted in the contention that AngloGold had been negligent in its legal duty to provide a safe and healthy work environment. However, entering an exception to the claim, AngloGold contended that section 35(1) of the Compensation for Occupational Injuries and Diseases Act, 1993 (COIDA) presented a statutory bar to such a claim. Section 35(1) provided that:

No action shall lie by an employee or any dependant of an employee for the recovery of damages in respect of any occupational injury or disease resulting in the disablement or death of such employee against such employee's employer, and no liability for compensation on the part of such employer shall arise save under the provisions of this Act in respect of such disablement or death.

In response, Mankayi argued that section 35(1) of COIDA did not apply to him or other mineworkers, because occupational disease in mineworkers was compensated under the industry-specific statute, ODIMWA. Section 100(2) of ODIMWA explicitly provided that workers who had a claim to compensation under ODIMWA were not entitled to claim compensation under any other law, and Mankayi took this to exclude the application of COIDA. ODIMWA, unlike COIDA, did not contain any prohibition against common-law claims against employers.

Handing down judgment on 26 June 2008, the Johannesburg High Court ruled in favour of AngloGold, upholding its exception. The High Court agreed with AngloGold that section 35(1) of COIDA extinguished the common-law right of mineworkers to recover damages from negligent mine owners. On appeal, in a judgment written by Judge of Appeal Fritz Brand and delivered on 31 March 2010, the Supreme Court of Appeal found the same. Mankayi lodged a final appeal in the Constitutional Court of South Africa, where he was represented by Richard Spoor during a hearing on 17 August 2010.

== Judgments ==
On 3 March 2011, the Constitutional Court handed down a unanimous judgment written by Justice Sisi Khampepe. The court upheld Mankayi's appeal, overturning the judgments of both lower courts on AngloGold's exception to his plea and preserving Mankayi's claim. Khampepe reached this decision by reading the "plain meaning" of the two statutes. As defined in section 1 of the act, COIDA did not contemplate mineworkers as "employees"; the act and section 35(1) thereof were intended to apply only to workers who had a claim to benefits under COIDA. Mineworkers were not included in this group. Indeed, in historical context, it was imminently reasonable for Parliament to have established two separate legislative regimes for compensating occupational injury; mineworkers were handled separately, under ODIMWA, because of "the particular risks and dangers associated with mining" and because of the unique importance of mining to the South African economy.

Justice Johan Froneman, who concurred in Khampepe's judgment, wrote separately to discuss the Constitutional Court's exercise of its discretion in granting leave to appeal to litigants. He agreed with Khampepe that leave to appeal should be granted in this case, but he outlined different reasons for that conclusion.

== Significance ==
The judgment was welcomed as "the Court's latest and most promising innovation in the area of occupational health and safety" and for seeking to "instil some sense of accountability in employers who have exploited workers working under horrendous conditions for many years". Though Makanyi had died of his illness just over a week before the judgment was delivered, his counsel, Richard Spoor, told the press that the judgment "opened the doors for miners to pursue class-action suits against negligent mining companies". Indeed, mineworkers with silicosis and tuberculosis went on to lodge a class action of unprecedented scale against 32 gold mining companies; it culminated in a R5 billion settlement.

== See also ==
- Occupational lung disease
- Mining in South Africa
- Statutory interpretation in South Africa
