= List of Constitutional Court opinions of Edwin Cameron =

Edwin Cameron served in the Constitutional Court of South Africa from January 2009 until his retirement in August 2019.

== Majority opinions ==
No.	Case name	Citation	Notes
1	In re: Constitutionality of the Liquor Bill	[1999] ZACC 15	Written as an acting justice.
2	SACCAWU v Irvin & Johnson	[2000] ZACC 10	Written as an acting justice.
3	Centre for Child Law v Minister for Justice and Constitutional Development	[2009] ZACC 18	
4	Women's Legal Centre Trust v President	[2009] ZACC 20	
5	Glenister v President	[2011] ZACC 6	Co-written with Moseneke.
6	S v S	[2011] ZACC 7	
7	The Citizen v McBride	[2011] ZACC 11	
8	Baphalane ba Ramokoka Community v Mphela Family	[2011] ZACC 15	
9	Naidoo v National Director of Public Prosecutions	[2011] ZACC 24	
10	Maphango v Aengus Lifestyle Properties	[2012] ZACC 2	
11	Sebola v Standard Bank	[2012] ZACC 11	
12	Giant Concerts v Rinaldo Investments	[2012] ZACC 28	
13	National Director of Public Prosecutions v Elran	[2013] ZACC 2	
14	KwaZulu-Natal Joint Liaison Committee v MEC for Education, KwaZulu-Natal	[2013] ZACC 10	
15	Food and Allied Workers Union v Ngcobo	[2013] ZACC 36	
16	Mbatha v University of Zululand	[2013] ZACC 43	
17	Estate Agency Affairs Board v Auction Alliance	[2014] ZACC 3	
18	MEC for Health, Eastern Cape v Kirkland Investments	[2014] ZACC 6	
19	Minister of Local Government, Environmental Affairs and Development Planning, Western Cape v Habitat Council	[2014] ZACC 9	
20	Sali v National Commissioner of the South African Police Service	[2014] ZACC 19	
21	National Union of Metal Workers of South Africa v Intervalve	[2014] ZACC 35	
22	Democratic Alliance v African National Congress	[2015] ZACC 1	Co-written with Froneman and Khampepe.
23	Nkata v Firstrand	[2016] ZACC 12	
24	University of Stellenbosch Legal Aid Clinic v Minister of Justice and Correctional Services	[2016] ZACC 32	Co-written with Zondo.
25	Gbenga-Oluwatoye v Reckitt Benckiser South Africa	[2016] ZACC 33	Co-written with Moseneke.
26	Absa v Moore	[2016] ZACC 34	
27	Merafong City Local Municipality v AngloGold Ashanti	[2016] ZACC 35	
28	Association of Mineworkers and Construction Union v Chamber of Mines	[2017] ZACC 3	
29	Genesis Medical Scheme v Registrar of Medical Schemes	[2017] ZACC 16	
30	Jordaan v City of Tshwane	[2017] ZACC 31	
31	Trinity Asset Management v Grindstone Investments	[2017] ZACC 32	
32	Salem Party Club v Salem Community	[2017] ZACC 46	
33	S v Okah	[2018] ZACC 3	
34	Electoral Commission of South Africa v Speaker of the National Assembly	[2018] ZACC 46	
35	Ruta v Minister of Home Affairs	[2018] ZACC 52	
36	Aquila Steel v Minister of Mineral Resources	[2019] ZACC 5	
37	Tiekiedraai Eiendomme v Shell South Africa Marketing	[2019] ZACC 14	
38	Mwelase v Department of Rural Development and Land Reform	[2019] ZACC 30	
39	Gelyke Kanse v Chairperson of the Senate of the University of Stellenbosch	[2019] ZACC 38	
