= Masetlha v President =

South African legal case

- Court: Constitutional Court of South Africa
- Full case name: Masetlha v President of the Republic of South Africa and Another
- Decided: 3 October 2007
- Docket nos.: CCT 01/07
- Citations: [2007] ZACC 20; 2008 (1) SA 566 (CC); 2008 (1) BCLR 1

Case history
- Prior actions: Masetlha v President of the Republic of South Africa and Another [2006] ZAGPHC 107; (2007) 28 ILJ 1013 (T) in the High Court of South Africa, Transvaal Provincial Division
- Related actions: Independent Newspapers v Minister for Intelligence Services [2008] ZACC 6; 2008 (5) SA 31 (CC); 2008 (8) BCLR 771 (CC)

Court membership
- Judges sitting: Langa CJ, Moseneke DCJ, Skweyiya J, Sachs J, Ngcobo J, Madala J, O'Regan J, Nkabinde J, van der Westhuizen J and Navsa AJ

Case opinions
- The presidential power to appoint and dismiss the head of the National Intelligence Agency is an executive power. The exercise of such power does not constitute administrative action and is not subject to review on the grounds of procedural fairness.
- Decision by: Moseneke DCJ (Langa CJ, Nkabinde J, O’ Regan J, Skweyiya J, van der Westhuizen J and Navsa AJ concurring)
- Concur/dissent: Sachs J
- Dissent: Ngcobo J (Madala J concurring)

Keywords
- Administrative action; audi alteram partem; executive power; Intelligence Services Act, 2002; National Intelligence Agency; procedural fairness; Promotion of Administrative Justice Act, 2000; Public Service Act, 1994

Masetlha v President of the Republic of South Africa and Another is an important decision in the Constitutional Court of South Africa which held that procedural fairness was not a ground for the review of executive action. Upholding President Thabo Mbeki's decision to dismiss Billy Masetlha as the head of the National Intelligence Agency, a majority of the court held that, unlike legality and rationality, procedural fairness was not a requirement for the lawful exercise of the President's powers of appointment and dismissal, the exercise of which constituted executive rather than administrative action. The matter was heard on 10 May 2007 and decided on 3 October 2007, with Deputy Chief Justice Dikgang Moseneke writing for the majority.

== Background and prior action ==
Billy Masetlha, the director-general of the National Intelligence Agency, was suspended from his office in October 2005 pending the outcome of a disciplinary probe into claims of misconduct. He remained on suspension until March 2006, when President Thabo Mbeki fired him, citing a breakdown of trust in their relationship. His difficulties at the National Intelligence Agency were widely believed to be related to an ongoing factional political battle between Mbeki and his former deputy, Jacob Zuma.

In the interim between his suspension and dismissal, Masetlha approached the High Court of South Africa seeking review of his suspension. He claimed that the suspension had been effected by an unlawful procedure: his suspension letter was signed by Ronnie Kasrils, the Minister of Intelligence, though President Mbeki later set down in a Presidential Minute that he had authorised the suspension. When Masetlha was fired in March, he filed a further application seeking review of his dismissal. He also enjoined Manala Manzini, who was appointed to replace him as director-general, as second respondent.

The two applications were conjoined and heard in the Pretoria High Court in November 2006, but they were dismissed in December 2006, when Judge Ben du Plessis held that his dismissal constituted lawful executive action and that his dismissal, in turn, rendered the suspension dispute moot. In March 2007, Masetlha was granted leave to appeal du Plessis's decision in the Constitutional Court of South Africa.

== Majority judgment ==
In a judgment written by Deputy Chief Justice Dikgang Moseneke, the majority refused Masetlha's appeal but ordered the President to pay him all remuneration and benefits that would have been due to him had he completed his three-year term in office.

The substantive contribution of the judgment was its discussion of the President's power to appoint and dismiss heads of the National Intelligence Agency. The majority held that although national legislation – in this case the Public Service Act, 1994 and Intelligence Services Act, 2002 – regulates the terms and conditions of employment of presidential appointees, the President's powers of appointment and dismissal arise from the Constitution, in this case section 209(2) thereof. The procedural requirements of national legislation must therefore be read in conjunction with the Constitution and with the overall "constitutional and operative legislative scheme" regulating national security and presidential authority. As Moseneke wrote, "The power and indeed obligation of the President to appoint the head of an intelligence service is not sourced from a private law relationship. It is a public law power. In other words, this dispute between the parties is not merely about a breach or wrongful termination of an employment contract. It is rather about whether public authority has been exercised in a constitutionally valid manner." The majority therefore held that the President had the requisite power and legal authority to terminate Masetlha's employment.

The majority held that the President's "special power" of appointment and dismissal is "reviewable on narrow grounds and constitutes executive action and not administrative action". Importantly, as an executive power, it is not constrained by the requirements of procedural fairness, which apply instead to the review of administrative action. Specifically, it is not subject to the requirements of the Promotion of Administrative Justice Act, 2000 or to the natural justice and common law principle of audi alteram partem. Instead, its exercise is subject to the constraint that it must be exercised lawfully, rationally, and in a manner consistent with the Constitution. Insofar as the lawful exercise of the power of appointment leads to the termination of an employment contract, employment law may additionally give rise to further legal consequences – in this case, the court ordered the President to pay out the remainder of the remuneration due to Masetlha in terms of his employment contract.

The majority also agreed with the High Court that the suspension dispute was rendered moot by the finding that the termination was lawful.

== Minority judgment ==
Justice Albie Sachs wrote a separate judgment in which he concurred with the majority's order and agreed that Masetlha's termination was lawful, but argued that Masetlha was entitled to fair labour practice (and financial recompense) as a matter of constitutional obligation.

Justice Sandile Ngcobo dissented from the majority, holding that the rule of law required that the President act fairly and that fairness in turn required the President to consult with Masetlha before deciding to terminate his appointment. In that respect, the President had acted in breach of the Constitution.

== Significance ==
Masetlha is sometimes viewed as unusually permissive in the narrow standards it applies to the review of exercises of public power. Clive Plasket, for example, was highly critical of the majority opinion insofar as it severed a presumed connection between procedural fairness and the rule of law; in Plasket's view, the rule of law entails procedural fairness and, contra Masetlha, executive decision-makers are required to follow fair procedures.

In 2010, the court handed down Albutt v Centre for the Study of Violence and Reconciliation, in which it held that the legality principle sometimes requires the application of procedural fairness standards to the exercise of public power, in cases where procedural fairness is a requirement for the rational exercise of that power. Plasket regarded Albutt as "an attempt... to undo some of the damage that had been caused by Masetlha (short of overruling it)", while others were concerned that it was "at loggerheads" with the decision in Masetlha. The Constitutional Court later addressed this tension directly in Law Society of South Africa v President, in which Chief Justice Mogoeng Mogoeng wrote for the majority:

The proposition in Masetlha might be seen as being at variance with the principle of procedural irrationality laid down in both Albutt and Simelane. But it is not so. Procedural fairness has to do with affording a party likely to be disadvantaged by the outcome the opportunity to be properly represented and fairly heard before an adverse decision is rendered. Not so with procedural irrationality. The latter is about testing whether, or ensuring that, there is a rational connection between the exercise of power in relation to both process and the decision itself and the purpose sought to be achieved through the exercise of that power.

In other words, according to Law Society, procedural fairness (at issue in Masetlha) must be distinguished from procedural rationality (at issue in Albutt). The latter, but not the former, is entailed by the principle of legality and is a requirement for the lawful exercise of a public power.
