= Albutt v Centre for the Study of Violence and Reconciliation =

South African legal case

- Court: Constitutional Court of South Africa
- Full case name: Albutt v Centre for the Study of Violence and Reconciliation and Others
- Decided: 23 February 2010
- Docket nos.: CCT 54/09
- Citations: [2010] ZACC 4; 2010 (3) SA 293 (CC); 2010 (2) SACR 101 (CC); 2010 (5) BCLR 391 (CC)

Case history
- Appealed from: High Court of South Africa, North Gauteng Division – Centre for the Study of Violence and Reconciliation and Others v President of the Republic of South Africa and Others [2009] ZAGPPHC 35

Court membership
- Judges sitting: Ngcobo CJ, Moseneke DCJ, Cameron J, Froneman J, Khampepe J, Mogoeng J, Nkabinde J, Skweyiya J and van der Westhuizen J

Case opinions
- Decision by: Ngcobo CJ (unanimous)
- Concurrence: Froneman J (Cameron and Froneman concurring)

Albutt v Centre for the Study of Violence and Reconciliation and Others is a 2010 decision of the Constitutional Court of South Africa which concerned a special presidential dispensation to pardon the perpetrators of politically motivated crimes committed during the apartheid era. The Constitutional Court held that the President of South Africa had contravened the Constitution in deciding not to consult the victims of those crimes before granting the pardons. The unanimous judgment was written by Chief Justice Sandile Ngcobo and delivered on 23 February 2010.

The Albutt judgment was notable for implicitly expanding the scope of rationality review to include the process by which organs of state take decisions – in this case, to include the relationship between the objectives of the special dispensation and the factors that the President considered in deciding how to use his constitutional power of pardon. By this method, the court found that the principle of rationality may confer upon organs of state a duty to consult, regardless of whether such a duty arises separately from the requirement that administrative action must be procedurally fair.

== Background ==
Between 1995 and 1998, the Truth and Reconciliation Commission operated as a restorative justice tribunal of the post-apartheid transition. Part of its mandate was to hear applications for amnesty from the perpetrators of politically motivated human rights abuses. Almost a decade after the commission concluded its work, in November 2007, President Thabo Mbeki announced that, in order to deal with the "unfinished business" of the Truth and Reconciliation Commission, he would institute a special dispensation under which he would pardon individuals who claimed to have been convicted of politically motivated criminal offences on any date before 16 June 1999. The Pardon Reference Group was appointed to consider applications for pardon and make recommendations to Mbeki and, later, to his successors, President Kgalema Motlanthe and President Jacob Zuma, but the pardons would be granted by the President in terms of the power granted to him by section 84(2)(j) of the Constitution.

A coalition of non-governmental organisations, under the name of the Civil Society Coalition, publicly opposed the special dispensation, warning that it could result in the award of pardons to notorious white nationalists such as Adriaan Vlok and the Afrikaner Weerstandsbeweging members who perpetrated the 1996 Shoprite bombing. The same group sought to secure public participation – and, in particular, the participation of the victims of the relevant offences – in the special dispensation process. They were rebuffed by the Pardon Reference Group in August 2008 and by the Presidency in March 2009.

== High Court action ==
The coalition of non-governmental organisations (comprising the Centre for the Study of Violence and Reconciliation, the Khulumani Support Group, the International Centre for Transitional Justice, the Institute for Justice and Reconciliation, the South African History Archives Trust, the Human Rights Media Centre, and the Freedom of Expression Institute) subsequently sought legal enforcement of their request in the High Court of South Africa. Represented by Geoff Budlender, they argued that the President's exclusion of victims was inconsistent with section 33 of the Constitution, with the Promotion of Administrative Justice Act 3 of 2000 (PAJA), and with the common law requirement of procedural fairness. President Motlanthe opposed the application, and he was joined by seven convicted individuals, who were granted leave to intervene.

On 29 April 2009, Judge Willie Seriti of the North Gauteng High Court ruled in favour of the applicants in granting an interim interdict which barred the President from granting any pardon under the special dispensation until the substantive challenge, regarding victim participation, had been resolved. Although this judgment did not, in principle, decide the substantive constitutional challenge, it expressed strong support for the applicants' arguments, holding that the victims of crime have a right to be heard prior to the award of presidential pardons, including pardons under the special dispensation. Per Seriti, this finding was supported by multiple legs of argument. For one thing, the exercise of the power to award a presidential pardon constitutes administrative action under PAJA and therefore is subject to PAJA's statutory requirements for procedural fairness; for another, it would be arbitrary to exclude victims from pardon proceedings when they are routinely included in parole proceedings.

The seven intervening convicts, supported by the President and the Minister of Justice and Constitutional Development, sought leave to appeal the High Court's judgment directly in the Constitutional Court of South Africa. In addition, one of the convicts, Ryan Albutt, an Afrikaner Weerstandsbeweging member, filed an application for direct access to the Constitutional Court, seeking to challenge the constitutionality of PAJA; that application was conditional on the Constitutional Court finding that PAJA supported the non-governmental organisations' case. The non-governmental organisations opposed both applications, which were heard by the Constitutional Court on 10 November 2009.

== Judgment ==
The Constitutional Court handed down judgment on 23 February 2010, with Chief Justice Sandile Ngcobo writing on behalf of a unanimous court. The court granted the convicts leave to appeal but dismissed the appeal, upholding the High Court's interim order. Although the High Court's order was upheld, the Constitutional Court's reasoning differed substantially with respect to the right of victims to be heard before a pardon is granted.

=== Rationality review ===
As Ngcobo pointed out, the Constitutional Court had recently affirmed in Minister for Justice and Constitutional Development v Chonco that the applicants for presidential pardons had the right to have their applications considered in accordance with the principle of legality and principle of rationality. The court therefore tested the President's decision according to a rationality test, under which, "the President’s decision to undertake the special dispensation process, without affording victims the opportunity to be heard, must be rationally related to the achievement of the objectives of the process".

Ngcobo surmised, based on Mbeki's public statements, that the purpose of the special dispensation was – akin to the Truth and Reconciliation Commission – the promotion of national unity and national reconciliation. Yet "the participation of victims" would be crucial to the achievement of these objectives. Likewise, the special dispensation was explicitly intended to grant pardons to the perpetrators of politically motivated offences, and the participation of victim would be crucial to establishing "the truth about the motive with which a crime was committed". Thus, "the context-specific features" of the special dispensation entail that victims "are entitled to be given the opportunity to be heard before the President makes a decision to grant pardon under the special dispensation". The President's decision to exclude victims was therefore irrational and inconsistent with the Constitution.

However, the court emphasised that its decision arose from "context-specific features" and special objectives of the special dispensation under dispute. Unlike the High Court, therefore, it did not make a determination on the question of whether the President has a broader duty to consult victims before considering any application for pardon.

=== Procedural fairness ===
A second challenge to the President's conduct arose not from the rationality principle but from the principle of procedural fairness. The non-governmental organisations' argued that procedural fairness itself implied a duty to consult the victims, procedural fairness in turn being grounded in three sources of law: the common law, section 33 of the Constitution (requiring just administrative action), and PAJA (applying only to administrative action as defined in PAJA). Counsel for the state and convicts argued that the President's power to grant pardon was an executive power, not an administrative power, and therefore was not subject to the requirement of procedural fairness.

Because the court grounded its finding of unconstitutionality in the principle of rationality, applied to the "context-specific" features of the case, it was not required to consider whether the power to pardon constitutes administrative action, nor whether a duty to consult arose separately from the principle of procedural fairness. Indeed, Ngcobo wrote that the High Court had erred in posing and answering those questions, which should instead be left "open". However, Ngcobo noted obiter that the non-governmental organisations' argument from common law was "attractive", citing in that connection his own dissent in Masetlha v President. Because the court did not reach PAJA, it also did not make any order concerning Albutt's application for direct access to challenge PAJA.

== Concurring judgment ==
In a brief concurring judgment, Justice Johan Froneman wrote separately to outline further reasons for his agreement with Ngcobo's approach. His opinion was joined by Justices Edwin Cameron and Johann van der Westhuizen; all three had also joined in Ngcobo's judgment.

== Significance ==
Albutt is frequently discussed alongside the Constitutional Court's judgment in Masetlha v President, which was handed down in November 2007 and from which Ngcobo had dissented. The Masetlha court had held that, per Deputy Chief Justice Dikgang Moseneke, "It would not be appropriate to constrain executive power to requirements of procedural fairness, which is a cardinal feature in reviewing administrative action." Clive Plasket, a critic of the Masetlha judgment, welcomed Albutt as "an attempt... to undo some of the damage that had been caused by Masetlha (short of overruling it)", while other commentators were concerned that it was "at loggerheads" with the decision in Masetlha.

The Constitutional Court later addressed this tension directly in Law Society of South Africa v President, in which Ngcobo's successor, Chief Justice Mogoeng Mogoeng, explained that Albutt concerned the duty to consult not as an element of procedural fairness (as in Masetlha) but as an element of rationality. Albutt came to be regarded as cornerstones of the doctrine of so-called procedural rationality, which concerns the procedure by which decisions are made and which substantially expands the test for rationality. That doctrine was further developed in the Simelane judgment, which cited Albutt as authority for the proposition that "both the process by which the decision is made and the decision itself must be rational".

== See also ==
- President v Hugo – early decision on presidential pardons
