= South African Police Service v Barnard =

South African legal case

- Court: Constitutional Court of South Africa
- Full case name: South African Police Service v Solidarity on behalf of Renate Barnard
- Decided: 2 September 2014
- Docket nos.: CCT 01/14
- Citations: [2014] ZACC 23; 2014 (6) SA 123 (CC); [2014] 11 BLLR 1025 (CC); 2014 (10) BCLR 1195 (CC); (2014) 35 ILJ 2981 (CC)

Case history
- Prior actions: Solidarity obo Barnard v South African Police Service [2013] ZASCA 177 in the Supreme Court of Appeal; South African Police Services v Solidarity obo Barnard [2012] ZALAC 31 in the Labour Appeal Court; Solidarity obo Barnard v South African Police Services [2010] ZALC 10 in the Labour Court

Court membership
- Judges sitting: Moseneke ACJ, Skweyiya ADCJ, Cameron J, Froneman J, Jafta J, Khampepe J, Madlanga J, van der Westhuizen J, Zondo J, Dambuza AJ and Majiedt AJ

Case opinions
- Decision by: Moseneke ACJ (Skweyiya, Dambuza, Jafta, Khampepe, Madlanga and Zondo concurring)
- Concurrence: Jafta J (Moseneke concurring)
- Concur/dissent: Cameron J, Froneman J and Majiedt AJ; Van der Westhuizen J

South African Police Service v Solidarity obo Barnard is a 2014 decision of the Constitutional Court of South Africa. It marked the first time that the Constitutional Court considered the constitutionality of employment equity measures. In a majority judgment written by Justice Dikgang Moseneke, the court upheld as lawful a decision by the South African Police Service not to promote a white woman on the basis that her elevation would not promote to the achievement of employment equity targets.

== Background ==
Renate Barnard, a white woman and a captain in the South African Police Service (SAPS), applied for a promotion in May 2006. After she and the other candidates were interviewed, the hiring panel recommended her as the most suitable candidate for the promotion, and the Divisional Commissioner endorsed this recommendation. However, the National Commissioner of the SAPS, Jackie Selebi, declined to appoint her, taking the view that the panel's recommendation did not take sufficient account of employment equity considerations. Since it was not a critical post, he recommended that the post should not be filled and that the vacancy should be re-advertised the following year.

== Court action ==
Aggrieved by the National Commissioner's decision, Barnard filed an internal complaint and later referred the dispute to the Commission for Conciliation, Mediation and Arbitration. Thereafter she approached the Labour Court for relief with the assistance of her trade union, Solidarity. She claimed that, in declining to promote her, the SAPS had unfairly discriminated against her on the ground of her race, in violation both of section 9(3) of the Constitution and of section 6(1) of the Employment Equity Act, 1998.

This argument was reprised in three different courts: the Labour Court of South Africa ruled in Barnard's favour in February 2010, but the Labour Appeal Court upheld the SAPS's appeal in November 2012, and then the Supreme Court of Appeal upheld Barnard's own appeal in November 2013. Thus the SAPS lodged a final appeal in the Constitutional Court of South Africa, which heard argument on 20 March 2014 and delivered judgment on 2 September 2014. The Police and Prisons Civil Rights Union was admitted as amicus curiae.

== Majority judgment ==
The Constitutional Court's majority judgment was written by Acting Chief Justice Dikgang Moseneke and was joined by Acting Deputy Chief Justice Thembile Skweyiya; Justices Chris Jafta, Sisi Khampepe, Mbuyiseli Madlanga, and Raymond Zondo; and Acting Justice Nambitha Dambuza. The majority upheld the SAPS's appeal against the decision of the Supreme Court of Appeal, setting that decision aside. Instead, it restored and upheld the decision of the Labour Appeal Court, which was written by Judge President Dunstan Mlambo, subject only to an amendment of the costs order handed down by Mlambo.

The majority found that the Supreme Court of Appeal had erred in its approach to Barnard's claim. Judge of Appeal Mahomed Navsa had applied the test for unfair discrimination outlined in Harksen v Lane, finding that the SAPS's decision constituted discrimination on the basis of race in terms of section 9(3) of the Constitution and that SAPS had not rebutted the presumption of unfairness that attached to that discrimination in terms of section 9(5) of the Constitution. Contrary to this approach, the appropriate test was outlined in Minister of Finance v Van Heerden, in which the Constitutional Court had held that the state can defend against a claim of unfair discrimination by demonstrating that the maligned decision was taken in terms of a restitutionary affirmative action measure protected under section 9(2) of the Constitution. In the present case, the National Commissioner had made his decision in terms of an Employment Equity Plan, which was uncontroversially a lawful affirmative action measure. It was therefore authorised both by section 9(2) of the Constitution and by section 6(2) of the Employment Equity Act.

Indeed, Barnard had accepted as much in her argument before the court. Instead, Barnard had pressed a different argument, contending that – even though the employment equity policy itself was lawful and valid – the National Commissioner's decision had not been made within the bounds of that policy, had been unreasonable, and therefore stood to be overturned as unlawful. The majority acknowledged that the National Commissioner's decision could be reviewed on these grounds: at the least, the principle of legality requires that the National Commissioner should implement the affirmative action measure in a manner that is "rationally related to the terms and objects of the measure". However, it was impermissible for Barnard to lodge this new line of attack during her argument before the Constitutional Court. Moreover, even if the court were to entertain the argument, it would find it to be without merit, because the National Commissioner's decision had been rational and lawful given the objectives of the affirmative action policy.

== Minority judgments ==
The full bench of the court was unanimous that SAPS's appeal should be upheld, but three additional judgments were filed. Justice Johann van der Westhuizen wrote separately on the grounds that, though he agreed with Moseneke's interpretation of section 9 of the Constitution, he disagreed that "an enquiry into the decision of the National Commissioner is not properly before us". Holding that such an enquiry stemmed naturally from Barnard's application to the court, he tested the National Commissioner's decision against the standard designed in Van Heerden. He concluded that the National Commissioner had adequate reasons for his decision and that the decision and underlying policy were lawful and consistent with the Constitution.

Justice Edwin Cameron, Justice Johan Froneman, and Acting Justice Steven Majiedt likewise filed a separate opinion, co-written between them, in which they, like van der Westhuizen, held that it was necessary to test the lawfulness of the National Commissioner's decision. They held that the decision must meet the standard of fairness, and they concluded that the National Commissioner's decision met this standard.

Finally, Justice Jafta, who had joined in Moseneke's judgment, also wrote a separate concurring judgment, in which Moseneke joined. He set out a detailed defence of Moseneke's finding that it was not necessary for the court to adjudicate Barnard's bid to review the lawfulness of the National Commissioner's decision, which he argued amounted to a new cause of action.

== Reception ==
Barnard was the Constitutional Court's first encounter with the constitutionality of affirmative action in the context of employment equity and related statute. Several commentators regarded it as a "missed opportunity" for the Constitutional Court to "reassert and refine" the Van Heerden test in that context. However, the Helen Suzman Foundation suggested that the limitations of the judgment were not due to any missteps by the court but instead were due to the misconceived litigation strategy of Solidarity on behalf of Barnard; in this view, the case should have been litigated from the outset as an application to review and set aside the National Commissioner's decision as a flawed implementation of the underlying employment equity policy.
