= Scorpions (South Africa) =

Specialised unit of the National Prosecuting Authority of South Africa

Directorate of Special Operations
- Common name: The Scorpions
- Abbreviation: DSO
- Motto: "Justice in action"

Agency overview
- Formed: January 2001
- Dissolved: January 2009
- Superseding agency: Directorate for Priority Crime Investigation
- Employees: 536
- Annual budget: R429 million (2008–09)

Jurisdictional structure
- Operations jurisdiction: South Africa
- Constituting instrument: National Prosecuting Authority Act of 1998

Operational structure
- Overseen by: Minister of Justice and Constitutional Development
- Agency executives: Frank Dutton (1999–2001); Percy Sonn (2001–2003); Leonard McCarthy (2003–2008)
- Parent agency: National Prosecuting Authority

The Directorate of Special Operations (DSO), commonly known as the Scorpions, was a specialised unit of the National Prosecuting Authority of South Africa formed by President Thabo Mbeki, tasked with investigating and prosecuting high-level and priority crimes including organised crime and corruption. An independent and multidisciplinary unit with a unique methodology which combined investigation, forensic intelligence, and prosecution, the Scorpions were known as an elite unit, and were involved in several extremely high-profile investigations, especially into the Arms Deal and into high-ranking African National Congress (ANC) politicians including Jackie Selebi, Jacob Zuma, and Tony Yengeni.

President Thabo Mbeki announced the establishment of the Scorpions in June 1999, promising "a special and adequately staffed and equipped investigative unit... to deal with all national priority crime, including police corruption." Though formally launched in Gugulethu on 1 September 1999 as the Directorate of Special Investigations, the unit did not legally or operationally come into existence until January 2001, by which time it had been renamed DSO. It was formally disbanded in January 2009 and replaced by the Hawks, a move pushed through Parliament by the ANC and often alleged to have been politically motivated.

== Mandate and organisational structure ==
The Scorpions were led by a Deputy Director of Public Prosecutions, a position first held by Frank Dutton (1999–2001) and later by Percy Sonn (2001–2003) and Leonard McCarthy (2003–2008). Their founding complement was 200 staff and, though this was supposed to expand to about 2,000 staff within two years, they employed only 536 staff at the time of their disbanding. They were divided into two main directorates: Operations, and Strategic and Investigative Support. Though independent, as a unit of the National Prosecuting Authority (NPA) the Scorpions drew their budget through the Ministry of Justice and Constitutional Development and were ultimately subject to the Minister's oversight.

The unit was governed by the 1998 NPA Act, Section 7 of which gave it extremely broad powers to investigate and prosecute any organised crime or any other crimes determined by presidential proclamation. Its operational mandate, however, was slightly narrower than its legislative mandate – it was envisaged that the Scorpions would discuss the cases it took on with the Minister and with the police. It came to focus on such crimes as drug trafficking; white-collar crime in government and the private sector, especially organised corruption and serious and complex financial crime; and money laundering and racketeering, especially under the 1998 Prevention of Organised Crime Act.

The Scorpions pursued a "prosecution-led" approach or "troika model", meaning that investigators, forensic analysts, and prosecutors worked together on each case – investigators collected evidence for study by analysts, and both were directed by the needs of prosecutors in building a legally strong case. This model has been criticised for undermining "the separation of powers" between investigators and prosecutors. However, it was evidently successful, with the Scorpions achieving a conviction rate of over 90% during its tenure. By February 2004, they had completed 653 cases, comprising 273 investigations and 380 prosecutions. 349 prosecutions resulted in convictions, representing an average conviction rate of 93.1%. Between 2005 and 2007, they initiated 368 investigations, completed 264, and prosecuted 214, with a conviction rate of 85%; during that period they also seized R1 billion in assets and contraband worth R1 billion.

== High-profile cases ==
The Scorpions gained a reputation for investigating and prosecuting high-profile cases, sometimes involving high-ranking politicians of the ruling party, the African National Congress (ANC). The Scorpions led the multi-year investigation into the Arms Deal, which began in 2001 or earlier and which led to the conviction on fraud and corruption charges of ANC politician Tony Yengeni and businessman Schabir Shaik, a close associate of Deputy President Jacob Zuma, who was himself ultimately charged with corruption. The investigation involved well-publicised raids at the houses of Shaik, Zuma, and former Transport Minister Mac Maharaj. The Congress of South African Trade Unions, the ANC's partner in the Tripartite Alliance, complained publicly about an 18 August 2005 raid at Zuma's home, alleging that the raids showed that the NPA "could be manipulated and influenced to take biased political decisions and act accordingly." Zuma later unsuccessfully challenged the legality of a raid on his former attorney's offices. At the time of the Scorpions' disbanding, they had reinstated corruption charges against Zuma. The last raid the Scorpions ever undertook was reportedly a major raid on BAE Systems premises in Pretoria and Cape Town in November 2008, linked to the Arms Deal probe.

In 2003, the Scorpions prosecuted Winnie Madikizela-Mandela and her broker on fraud charges. In 2004, they arrested Mark Thatcher, son of former Prime Minister Margaret Thatcher, at his house in Cape Town, in relation to his suspected involvement in a coup attempt in Equatorial Guinea earlier that year. He pled guilty in the Cape Town High Court to contravening the Regulation of Foreign Military Assistance Act of 1998. In 2005, the Scorpions charged forty or more Members of Parliament (MPs), primarily ANC members, with fraud, in so-called "Travelgate." More than thirty MPs, including Bathabile Dlamini, were ultimately convicted on fraud or related charges. And, from 2006 or earlier, the Scorpions investigated National Police Commissioner and close Mbeki ally Jackie Selebi, also for corruption. Selebi was ultimately convicted, following a highly politicised trial – in the run-up to which the chief prosecutor, Gerrie Nel of the Scorpions, was himself arrested, and the head of the NPA, Vusi Pikoli, suspended. The Scorpions also investigated and charged mafia don Vito Palazzolo, mining magnate Billy Rautenbach, and – both on drug smuggling charges and on charges related to the death of ANC donor Brett Kebble – Glen Agliotti.

== Controversies and demise ==
The Scorpions, though popular with most of the public, were controversial among politicians and government officials. Common complaints were that the details of the Scorpions' investigations were frequently leaked to the public before prosecution had commenced; that the Scorpions abused their power in exercising search and seizure warrants (including in the Zuma investigation, in which the ANC said that they had displayed "Hollywood tactics"); that they pursued selective and politically motivated prosecutions; and that they did not work well with the South African Police Service (SAPS).

=== Khampepe Commission ===
On 1 April 2005, amid such complaints against the Scorpions, President Mbeki appointed Judge Sisi Khampepe to head a commission of inquiry (known as the Khampepe Commission) to review the mandate and location of the Scorpions. In June 2006, Mbeki decided, in consultation with Cabinet and the National Security Council, to "accept in principle the recommendations of the Commission." These recommendations included that:

- The Scorpions should continue to reside within the NPA;
- The Scorpions' prosecutors should continue to be subject to the authority of the National Director of Public Prosecutions and to the oversight of the Minister of Justice and Constitutional Development;
- The Scorpions should additionally be subject to the oversight of the Minister of Safety and Security on its law enforcement (as opposed to prosecutorial) responsibilities;
- The Scorpions should continue to deal with high-level priority crimes and cases referred to it by the SAPS; and
- The capacity of the police should be enhanced, for example by awarding it the same legal powers as the Scorpions and by co-locating prosecutors within its structures.

The Commission also expressed concern about "the manner in which the DSO publicised the subject matter [of] some of its investigations," which it felt could violate the rights of those being investigated, and about the poor relationship between the Scorpions and the police.

Controversially, Mbeki did not release the Khampepe report itself, only a statement summarising its contents. In early 2008, opposition party the Democratic Alliance requested the release of the report in terms of the Promotion of Access to Information Act, though the Presidency claimed that complying with the request would undermine national security. The report was released on 5 May 2008.

=== Disbanding ===
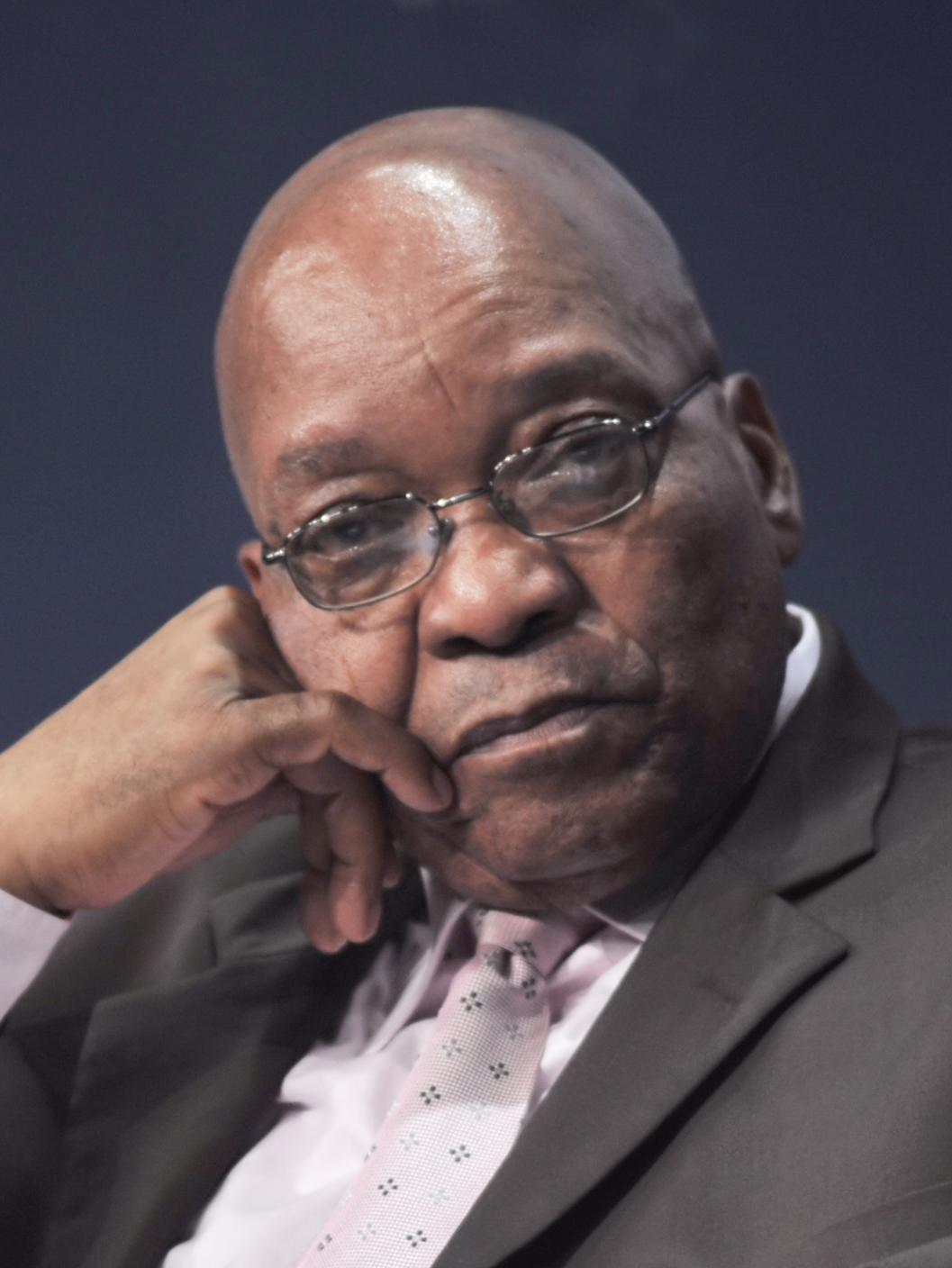
The ANC under Jacob Zuma resolved to disband the Scorpions

In 2007, in the run-up to the ANC's 52nd National Conference, Zuma ran for the ANC presidency, challenging the incumbent, national President Mbeki. A key part of his campaign platform was the disbanding of the Scorpions. Zuma won the election comfortably, and the conference resolved that the Scorpions should be disbanded "as a matter of urgency" in order to facilitate the constitutional imperative of a "single police service." When Parliament reconvened in early 2008, the disbanding of the Scorpions was announced as a legislative priority. Minister of Safety and Security, Charles Nqakula (who was at that time responsible for the SAPS), said in February that the Scorpions would be dissolved and amalgamated with a new organised crime unit of the SAPS. This was pursued through amendments to the NPA and SAPS Acts, and the ANC National Executive Committee set a deadline of June 2008 for the passage of the amendments, with a parliamentary committee, chaired by Maggie Sotyu, set up to oversee progress.

The decision was controversial, and it was opposed by a majority of South Africans and various interest groups. The Inkatha Freedom Party, the Democratic Alliance (DA), the African Christian Democratic Party, the Independent Democrats, the United Democratic Movement, and the Congress of the People all expressed extreme dismay over the decision, and the DA was prominent in accusing the ANC of making the move in order to subvert investigations into corrupt ANC officials. However, because the ANC had a supermajority in Parliament, opposition parties had little legislative recourse to oppose the amendments. Mbeki, still the national President though no longer the ANC President, also reportedly fought to keep the Scorpions intact.

On 23 October 2008, the National Assembly passed both amendments by a vote of 252 in favour and 63 opposed. President Kgalema Motlanthe (appointed after Mbeki resigned) signed the legislation into law in January 2009. Prosecutors at the Scorpions were absorbed into other branches of the NPA, while investigators were moved to the new Directorate for Priority Crime Investigation, colloquially known as the Hawks, which the new legislation established under the SAPS. Controversially, the Hawks subsequently shut down the Scorpions' investigation into Arms Deal corruption, which on some accounts had been at the centre of political opposition to the Scorpions.

=== Court challenge ===
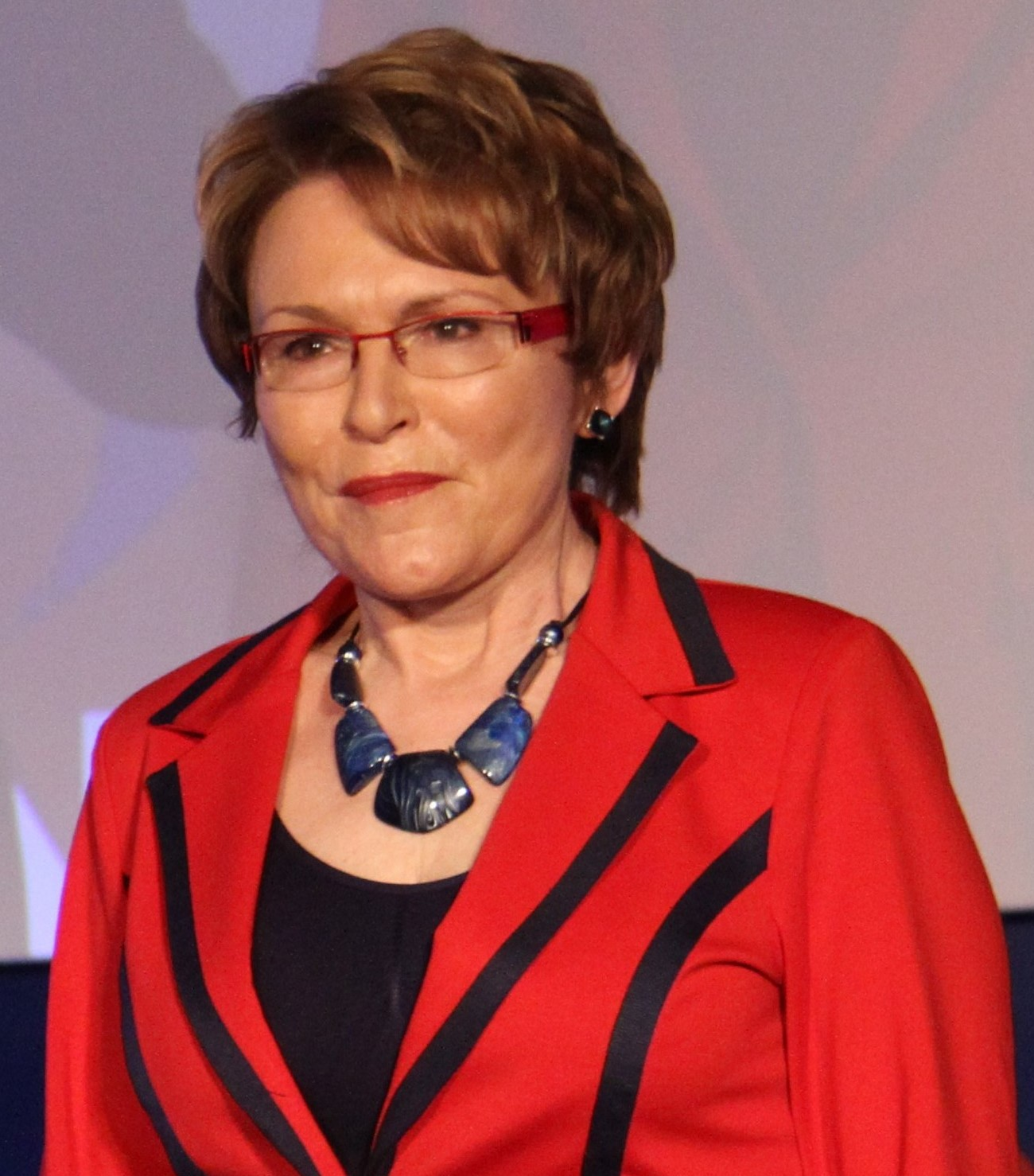
Helen Zille was a vocal supporter of the Scorpions

In May 2008, while the relevant legislation was before Parliament, the Pretoria High Court heard an application to interdict, on constitutional grounds, the disbanding of the Scorpions. A private citizen, businessman Hugh Glenister, filed the application. The DA, the African Christian Democratic Party, the Independent Democrats, and the United Democratic Movement all participated in the hearing as friends of the court, and in a joint submission alleged that the decision to disband the Scorpions had been made not by an organ of state but by the ANC, "in an effort to protect its members from investigation and prosecution for alleged transgressions." The High Court found that it did not have jurisdiction to adjudicate a separation of powers matter, and the case went to the Constitutional Court, where it was heard and dismissed as Glenister v President.

Once the legislation had been passed into law, Glenister challenged it anew in Glenister v President II. On 17 March 2011, the Constitutional Court ruled – in a narrow five-to-four judgement – that sections of the relevant acts were inconsistent with the Constitution, and that the disbanding of the Scorpions had therefore been constitutionally invalid. The substance of the dispute was over the autonomy of the Hawks: international norms and the Constitution provide that the state must establish some independent body to investigate corruption, so the legal question was whether the Hawks fulfilled this role. Dissenting judges said that the Hawks did have structural and operational autonomy, while the majority judgement, prepared by Dikgang Moseneke and Edwin Cameron, found otherwise. Whereas the Scorpions, as a unit of the NPA, had been nominally independent of the executive branch, the activities of the Hawks were effectively directly controlled by the Minister of Safety and Security, who had executive authority over the police, and it was therefore "insufficiently insulated from political interference."

The Constitutional Court judgement did not disband the Hawks and reinstate the Scorpions – instead, Parliament was given 18 months to make the legislation compliant with the Constitution. Parliament attempted to address the judgement by amending the SAPS Act again, and in 2014 Glenister – who had already paid R3.8 million in legal fees in the preceding court challenge – again challenged the law in court, arguing that the amendments provided insufficient remedy. The Helen Suzman Foundation also launched its own application. The case ultimately went to the Constitutional Court, which agreed that certain provisions of the Act remained unconstitutional, and struck those provisions aside.

In 2019, Minister of Police Bheki Cele, announced that the SAPS Act would be reviewed and the independence of the Hawks re-examined. Further amendments to the SAPS Act are currently proposed in the SAPS Amendment Bill of 2020, which SAPS has said responds to the 2014 Constitutional Court judgement and which would put crime intelligence units under the control of the SAPS National Commissioner, rather than the Minister.

== See also ==
- Corruption in South Africa
- Bulelani Ngcuka
- Vusi Pikoli
- Glynnis Breytenbach
