= S v Singo =

South African legal case

- Court: Constitutional Court of South Africa
- Full case name: Maluto Singo v The State
- Decided: 12 June 2002
- Citations: [2002] ZACC 10, 2002 (4) SA 858 (CC), 2002 (8) BCLR 793 (CC)

Case history
- Appealed from: Venda Division

Court membership
- Judges sitting: Chaskalson CJ, Langa DCJ, Ackermann, Goldstone, Kriegler, Madala, Ngcobo, O'Regan & Sachs JJ, Du Plessis & Skweyiya AJJ

Case opinions
- Decision by: Ngcobo

S v Singo is an important case in South African criminal procedure, heard in the Constitutional Court on 12 March 2002, with judgment delivered on 12 June 2002. The presiding officers were Chaskalson CJ, Langa DCJ, Ackermann J, Goldstone J, Kriegler J, Madala J, Ngcobo J, O'Regan J, Sachs J, Du Plessis AJ and Skweyiya AJ. JG Wasserman SC (with A. Louw) appeared for the applicant at the request of the Court, and JA van S d'Oliveira SC (with AL Collopy and R. Sampson) for the State.

== Procedure ==
The procedure envisaged in section 72(4) of the Criminal Procedure Act consists of two distinct yet connected enquiries. The court may, but need not, undertake either enquiry.

The first is when the court considers whether or not to issue a warrant for the arrest of the accused person. At this stage the accused is absent and the court of its own accord establishes whether the two pre-conditions to issue a warrant of arrest exist. These conditions are that the accused person

1. had been duly warned in terms of sections (1)(a) or (b); and
2. has failed to comply with the warning.

The second phase begins when the accused person is brought to court and the summary procedure is invoked. At this stage it is not necessary for the court to be satisfied afresh as to whether the two pre-conditions exist. Their existence will ordinarily appear from the record and therefore be prima facie established. The court is indeed required to record in full the proceedings at which the warning is given, and an extract of such proceedings, if certified as correct, is prima facie proof of the warning given. It is therefore imperative that the warning be recorded in full.

Where the warning was issued by a police official, the terms of the warning will appear from a written notice completed by the official. When the accused appears in court pursuant to the provisions of section 72(4), she or he may be asked by the presiding officer whether non-compliance with the warning is conceded. Depending on the response to the question, the summary procedure may continue. In order to comply with the obligation imposed by section 35(3) of the Constitution, the presiding officer implementing the 72(4) procedure must ensure that it is fair. Therefore, unless the accused is legally represented, the court ought, the moment it decides to pursue the matter of the ostensible non-compliance with the warning, to explain the nature and requirements and effect of the proceedings about to be commenced. This explanation should include telling the accused that it appears from the record that she or he was duly warned—the contents of the warning may have to be explained—and that there was a non-appearance or other failure to comply with the warning. It should include telling the accused

- that such non-compliance is an offence for which the law allows a fine or imprisonment of up to three months; and
- that, unless the pre-conditions are cogently challenged, they may be regarded as having been established, whereupon the court will be empowered there and then to investigate the issue of culpable non-compliance and intends doing so.

In addition to the above, the presiding officer is obliged to inform an undefended accused of his or her basic procedural rights. The enquiry must be conducted in a fair and impartial manner. As part of the enquiry, the presiding officer must establish from the accused whether she or he disputes the fact that she or he was duly warned, giving the details of the warning as recorded, and that she or he failed to comply with the warning. If the accused does not dispute the two basic facts, the presiding officer must then establish from the accused the reason for his failure to appear in court. Fairness requires the presiding officer to assist an undefended accused to explain their failure to appear in court by putting questions to the accused.

By its very nature, the enquiry envisaged in section 72(4) contemplates that the presiding officer will play an active role in such an enquiry by putting questions to the accused. The objective of such questions is to elicit the explanation, if any, for failure to appear in court. Provided that the questioning is conducted in a fair and impartial manner, this will help an undefended accused to put forward the reason for his failure to appear in court.

== Judgment ==
It could not be gainsaid, the court held, that the person being dealt with in terms of section 72(4) was an accused person as contemplated in section 35(3) of the Constitution. From this it followed that the provisions of section 35(3) were applicable to the enquiry.

=== Constitutionality of the summary procedure in section 72(4) ===
The court found that, although the procedure provided for in s 72(4) is summary and does not conform to the customary adversarial trial procedure, the enquiring court is obliged to furnish details of the alleged offence to the accused. The elements of the charge are likely to be very simple. Should the accused require particularity, however, the enquiring court must furnish it there and then. The absence of a formal written charge-sheet, therefore, is of no consequence. While the accused does not have the opportunity to make a formal written request for further particulars, he nevertheless enjoys the right to be informed of the details of the charge against him. The court held, accordingly, that the summary procedure does not, in this respect, limit the accused's right to a fair trial. There is, furthermore, nothing is section 72(4) to the effect that the right to adduce and challenge evidence is limited.

The purpose of the summary procedure, the court found, is to get the accused to explain his failure to comply with a warning. To achieve this purpose, the burden of proof is imposed upon the accused, which, if he should fail to discharge it, usually results in a conviction. Remaining silent, therefore, invariably invites conviction. This is so because the fact of the warning and the failure to comply will ordinarily become conclusive proof and, in the absence of an explanation for the failure, the conviction must usually ensue. Viewed in this context, the court found that the summary procedure and the burden of proof imposed upon the accused are inseparable. The burden of proof is essential to the effectiveness of the summary procedure and the achievement of its purpose. The combined effect of the two is that the accused is compelled to break her or his silence by the risk of a conviction. To this extent, the court determined, the summary procedure envisaged in s 72(4) limits the right to remain silent and not to testify at such an inquiry.

=== Limitation on the right to be presumed innocent and the right to remain silent ===
The effect of the phrase "unless such a person satisfies the court that his failure was not due to fault on his part" was found by the court to be plain. Once the warning and the failure to comply with it have been established, the accused must establish that the failure was not due to his or her fault. If the probabilities are evenly balanced, the accused has failed to satisfy the court as required. Conviction and sentence must therefore follow. In effect, the court found, where there is a reasonable doubt as to whether the failure to appear was due to the fault of the accused, he or she is nevertheless liable to be convicted because the court has not been satisfied as required by the provision.

What emerges from s 72(4), therefore, are two features that raised constitutional concerns for the court:

1. It requires the accused to disprove fault, which is an element of the offence he or she faces.
2. The accused is liable to be convicted despite the existence of a reasonable doubt.

These, the court held, are clear limitations of the right to be presumed innocent guaranteed in section 35(3)(h) of the Constitution.

Apart from this, the accused was compelled to adduce evidence in order to avoid a conviction. The effect of the presumption therefore was to force the accused to break his silence. Therefore, s 72(4) limited the rights to be presumed innocent and to remain silent guaranteed in s 35(3)(h) of the Constitution.

=== Justification for limitation of accused's rights ===
The court held, having regard to the importance of dealing effectively with conduct that hampers the administration of justice, that the incursion into the right to silence was justifiable. The same could not be said, however, of the legal burden which required a conviction despite the existence of a reasonable doubt.

Section 72(4) also limited the right to be presumed innocent. The South African conception of justice and forensic fairness demands that an accused person be presumed innocent until proven guilty, and that the State be required to establish his or her guilt beyond a reasonable doubt. Section 72(4) demanded the opposite, presuming the accused guilty and requiring the accused to establish his innocence on a balance of probabilities. It carried the risk that an innocent person might be sent to jail. That this may have been a rare occurrence did not matter. The court held that, once it is established that such a risk exists, a fundamental principle of the South African criminal justice system has been offended.

Having regard to the importance of the right to be presumed innocent in the South African criminal justice system and the fact that the State could have achieved its objective by less intrusive means, the imposition of the legal burden upon an accused had a disproportional impact on the right in question. In these circumstances, the court held, the risk of convicting an innocent person was too high, and outweighed the other considerations in favour of the limitation. There were no compelling societal reasons in this particular case that would justify imposing this legal burden on the accused. Therefore, the court held that the limitation was not justified.

=== Remedy ===
Striking down section 72(4) and leaving it at that, the court held, would leave a vacuum in the present legislative structure which was designed to deal with conduct that hinders the administration of justice. In this regard, the court thought it important to bear in mind that section 72(4) deals with the case of an accused who has failed to comply with the warning to appear in court. There was no other provision that dealt with such an accused. While it was true that Parliament could remedy the situation, that would take time; in the interim a gap would remain.

In all the circumstances, the court found it appropriate to read in words necessary to establish an evidentiary burden. This would be less invasive than simply to strike down section 72(4), which accordingly was henceforth to be read as if the words "there is a reasonable possibility that" appeared between the words "that" and "his failure."

== See also ==
- Criminal procedure in South Africa
