= Doctors for Life v Speaker =

South African legal case

- Court: Constitutional Court of South Africa
- Full case name: Doctors for Life International v Speaker of the National Assembly and Others
- Decided: 17 August 2006
- Docket nos.: CCT 12/05
- Citations: [2006] ZACC 11; 2006 (12) BCLR 1399 (CC); 2006 (6) SA 416 (CC)

Court membership
- Judges sitting: Langa CJ, Moseneke DCJ, Madala, Mokgoro, Ngcobo, Nkabinde, O'Regan, Sachs, Skweyiya, Van der Westhuizen and Yacoob JJ

Case opinions
- The Constitution obliges the legislatures to take reasonable steps to enable effective public participation in the legislative process in respect of each bill passed. The National Council of Provinces failed to fulfil this obligation in respect of the Choice on Termination of Pregnancy Amendment Act, 2004 and the Traditional Health Practitioners Act, 2004; both laws are therefore invalid.
- Decision by: Ngcobo J (Langa, Moseneke, Madala, Mokgoro, Nkabinde, O'Regan and Sachs concurring)
- Concurrence: Sachs J
- Dissent: Yacoob J (Skweyiya concurring)
- Dissent: Van der Westhuizen J

In Doctors for Life International v Speaker of the National Assembly and Others, the Constitutional Court of South Africa held that Parliament and the provincial legislatures are constitutionally obliged to take reasonable steps to enable effective public participation in the legislative process in respect of every law passed. The court invalidated the Choice on Termination of Pregnancy Amendment Act, 2004 and the Traditional Health Practitioners Act, 2004 on the basis that the National Council of Provinces had not solicited public submissions on the laws before passing them.

The court was split eight-to-three on the merits of the application. Justice Sandile Ngcobo wrote the majority judgment, a lengthy judgment that drew heavily on the principle of participatory democracy. Justice Zak Yacoob, who wrote the leading dissent, disagreed with Ngcobo's conception of the nature, scope, and justiciability of the section 72 obligation, and he warned strongly against judicial trespass on the separation of powers, arguing that such trespass indirectly infringed the political rights of voters in a representative democracy.

== Background ==
The case concerned the passage of four national statutes: the Choice on Termination of Pregnancy Amendment Act, 2004; the Sterilisation Amendment Act, 2005; the Traditional Health Practitioners Act, 2004; and the Dental Technicians Amendment Act, 2004. Because they concerned the provision of healthcare services, the statutes were passed in both houses of the Parliament of South Africa, as required by section 76 of the Constitution. In turn, the upper house, the National Council of Provinces (NCOP), was required to obtain a mandate from each of the nine provincial legislatures before passing the statutes.

The applicants in the case, the non-profit Doctors for Life International, complained that, in respect of the health legislation, the NCOP and provincial legislatures had not complied with their constitutional obligations. In particular, section 72(1)(a) of the Constitution requires the NCOP to "facilitate public involvement in the legislative and other processes of the [NCOP] and its committees"; an identical requirement applies to the upper house, the National Assembly, in terms of section 59(1)(a), as well as to the provincial legislatures in terms of section 118(1)(a). Doctors for Life contended that these provisions obliged the legislatures to invite public submissions (in writing or orally at public hearings) on pending bills. In respect of the health legislation, the National Assembly had taken those steps but the NCOP and provincial legislatures had not.

== Constitutional Court proceedings ==
Doctors for Life brought its application to the Constitutional Court directly, on the basis that, under section 167(4)(e) of the Constitution, the court's exclusive jurisdiction was engaged by the claim that Parliament had failed to fulfil a constitutional obligation. The first and second respondents were the Speaker of the National Assembly and the Chairperson of the NCOP respectively; the speakers of the nine provincial legislatures joined during proceedings, as was the Minister of Health. The matter was heard over days, 23 August 2005 and 21 February 2006, and judgment was delivered on 17 August 2006.

Justice Sandile Ngcobo wrote for the Constitutional Court's eight-member majority, joined by Chief Justice Pius Langa, Deputy Chief Justice Dikgang Moseneke, and Justices Tholie Madala, Yvonne Mokgoro, Bess Nkabinde, Kate O'Regan, and Albie Sachs. Sachs also wrote a separate concurrence with additional comment on the "special meaning" of participatory democracy in South Africa, as well as on the proper remedy in such cases. The leading dissent was written by Justice Zak Yacoob and joined by Justice Thembile Skweyiya; Justice Johann van der Westhuizen wrote a separate judgment outlining his reasons for agreeing with Yacoob's findings.

== Constitutional challenge ==
=== Majority judgment ===
In his majority judgment, Ngcobo held that section 72(1)(a) and similar provisions should be interpreted in light of the principles of South African democracy, which he viewed as a participatory democracy as well as a representative democracy. The Constitution granted the legislature "considerable discretion in determining how best to achieve this balanced relationship" between the democracy's representative and participatory elements, but it also obliged the Constitutional Court to intervene – even at the cost of impinging on legislative autonomy – when Parliament failed to fulfil a constitutional obligation.

In Ngcobo's interpretation, section 72(1)(a) requires that the NCOP should have "taken steps to afford the public a reasonable opportunity to participate effectively in the law-making process" and thus "a meaningful opportunity to be heard in the making of the laws that will govern them". This includes extending opportunities for such participation, such as by soliciting oral and written submissions from the public, and taking "measures to ensure that people have the ability to take advantage of the opportunities provided", such as by providing adequate notice, information, and political education.

In deciding whether the legislature had complied with its section 72(1)(a) obligation, Ngcobo found that the court's task was to determine whether the legislature had taken reasonable steps, in the circumstances, to facilitate effective public participation, with reference to such factors as parliamentary rules, the nature and urgency of the bills under consideration, and "practicalities such as time and expense". Ngcobo viewed the reasonableness standard as the best way for the courts to "balance, on the one hand, the need to respect parliamentary institutional autonomy, and on the other, the right of the public to participate in public affairs". Using this standard, he found that the NCOP's process in respect of the Dental Technicians Amendment Act had been reasonable, because there had been little evidence of public interest in the legislation. By contrast, there was a great deal of public interest in the Choice on Termination of Pregnancy Amendment Act and the Traditional Health Practitioners Act; in failing to solicit public submissions on those two laws, the NCOP had failed to fulfil its duty to take reasonable steps to facilitate public involvement in the laws' passage.

The Sterilisation Amendment Act was excluded from consideration because it had not been signed into law at the time that Doctors for Life launched the proceedings; the court held that it was not competent to grant relief in relation to bills before they were assented to by the President.

=== Dissenting judgment ===
Yacoob's dissent turned on a narrower examination of the meaning of the constitutional directive to "facilitate public involvement in... legislative and other processes". Based on an analysis of the Constitution's use of the words "participate" and "participation", he concluded that "public involvement", as envisaged in section 72(1)(a), is distinct from, and means "something less than", direct public participation. Indeed, given that the provision requires public involvement in "legislative and other processes" broadly, a stronger interpretation would have absurd consequences: it would clearly be untenable for the public to be directly involved in every process of the legislature, such as the election of the President (an indirect election in terms of the Constitution) or of presiding officers.

On the whole, the language of section 72(1)(a) cannot sensibly be construed as requiring that the public must be given an opportunity to comment on draft legislation. Even the implication that Parliament is required to take "reasonable steps" to facilitate public involvement would be too strong: the provision was carefully drafted at a high level of generality. And it was still more strained to infer that either public participation or public involvement was a constitutional pre-requisite to the passage of valid legislation, given that other sections of the Constitution provided a detailed synopsis of the legislative process without referring to any mandatory consultation stage.

More broadly, Yacoob argued that direct public involvement in the legislative process was not a pre-requisite for participatory democracy. Further, the importance of representative democracy should not be understated: "Constitutionally speaking, it is the people of our country who, through their elected representatives pass laws". The majority's interpretation of section 72(1)(a) thus imposed a significant "limitation on the power of elected representatives of the people to make law", which in turn undermined the public's political rights.

== Order and remedy ==
=== Majority judgment ===
The majority's order declared, in terms of section 167(4)(e) of the Constitution, that Parliament had failed to comply with its section 72(1)(a) constitutional obligation to facilitate public involvement before passing the Choice on Termination of Pregnancy Amendment Act and Traditional Health Practitioners Act. It directed that both Acts were therefore "adopted in a manner that is inconsistent with the Constitution" and declared both Acts to be invalid, although the declaration of invalidity was suspended for 18 months to enable Parliament to re-enact them in a manner compliant with the Constitution. The invalidation of the legislation on the basis of a procedural flaw was an exceptional measure, but Ngcobo held that public involvement was "a material part of the law-making process, "a requirement of manner and form", and that legislation passed in its absence was therefore invalid.

In his separate judgment, Sachs wrote that, although he concurred with the order in this case, he felt that similar orders should not be handed down in future cases without caution:

I would prefer to leave the way open for incremental evolution on a case by case in future. The touchstone, I believe, must be the extent to which constitutional values and objectives are implicated. I fear that the virtues of participatory democracy risk being undermined if the result of automatic invalidation is that relatively minor breaches of the duty to facilitate public involvement produce a manifestly disproportionate impact on the legislative process. Hence my caution at this stage. In law as in mechanics, it is never appropriate to use a steam-roller to crack a nut.

=== Dissenting judgment ===
In his dissent, Yacoob warned strongly against nonchalantly issuing section 167(4)(e) declarations of the kind endorsed by the majority, given the "grave separation of powers implications" of such orders:

In my view section 167(4)(e) orders can only be made when it is in the interests of justice and good government to do so. Circumstances that come into the equation when determining whether an order must be made cannot be exhaustively defined. They do include the following: the nature of the obligation; the importance of its performance to a society based on dignity, equality and freedom; whether the obligation emerges sufficiently clearly from the Constitution so as to draw the inference that Parliament, that is to say, the majority of legislators in the legislative body concerned, would have understood the nature of the obligation and would have known that they had to perform it and whether there had been sufficient time after the knowledge and understanding by the relevant legislators to facilitate compliance with the obligation.

Because he found that the health legislation's passage had complied with the Constitution, he was not required to formulate a remedy, but he suggested that "this Court ought never to intervene during the proceedings of Parliament unless irreparable and substantial harm would otherwise result".

== Significance ==
Doctors for Life was the first time that the Constitutional Court elucidated the content of the legislature's duty to facilitate public involvement. It was reinforced very shortly afterwards by the court's judgment in Matatiele Municipality v President (No. 2); according to his former law clerk, Elizabeth Brundige, Ngcobo's research for his judgment in Doctors for Life inspired his approach in Matatiele, in which he also wrote the majority judgment.
