= Kenneth Mthiyane =

South African judge (1944–2021)

The Honourable Kenneth Mthiyane SC

Deputy President of the Supreme Court of Appeal of South Africa
- In office 2012–2014
- Preceded by: Louis Harms
- Succeeded by: Mahomed Navsa (Acting)

Judge of the Supreme Court of Appeal
- In office 2001–2012

Judge of the KwaZulu-Natal Division of the Supreme Court
- In office 1997–2001

Personal details
- Born: Khayelihle Kenneth Mthiyane; 13 September 1944 Ndwedwe, South Africa
- Died: 28 January 2021 (aged 76)
- Citizenship: South African
- Education: University of South Africa; University of Natal

Khayelihle Kenneth Mthiyane SC (13 September 1944 – 28 January 2021) was a South African jurist, judge and deputy President of the Supreme Court of Appeal of South Africa.

== Early life and education ==
Mthiyane was born in Ndwedwe, in Kwazulu-Natal and received his education at Loram Secondary school, where he matriculated in 1967. He then enrolled at the University of South Africa and obtained his BIuris degree in 1972 after which he furthered his studies at the University of Natal obtaining an LL.B. in 1984 and an LL.M. in 1994.

== Career ==
Mthiyane was admitted as an attorney in 1975 and nine years later was admitted as an advocate, joining the Durban Bar in 1984. He was granted senior counsel status in 1995 and was given his first acting judge appointment shortly thereafter. Mthiyane was appointed judge to the KwaZulu-Natal Division of the High Court. In 2001, he was appointed a Judge of the Supreme Court of Appeal and, after serving for eleven years in that court, was appointed its Deputy President of the court in 2012, which post he held until he retired in 2014. He then served as a Chairperson of the Electoral Court of South Africa.

== Death ==
Mthiyane died on 28 January 2021, after a short illness due to COVID-19 complications during the COVID-19 pandemic in South Africa, and within a week after the funeral of his wife, Mrs S'thandiwe Mthiyane.
