= Mahomed Navsa =

South African judge

The Honourable Mahomed Navsa SC

Acting Justice of the Constitutional Court of South Africa
- In office February 2008 – May 2008

Acting Deputy President of the Supreme Court of Appeal of South Africa
- In office 2015–2015
- Preceded by: Kenneth Mthiyane
- Succeeded by: Mandisa Maya

Judge of the Supreme Court of Appeal
- In office 2000–2022
- Nominated by: Judicial Service Commission
- Appointed by: Thabo Mbeki

Judge of the Transvaal Division of the Supreme Court
- In office 1995–2000

Personal details
- Born: Mahomed Solomon Navsa; 24 May 1957 (age 69) Edenvale, Gauteng, South Africa
- Children: 3
- Education: William Pescod Secondary School University of the Western Cape
- Occupation: Judge of Appeal
- Profession: Lawyer

Mahomed Solomon Navsa (born 24 May 1957) is a judge of the Supreme Court of Appeal of South Africa and its Acting Deputy President in 2015.

== Early life ==
Navsa was born in 1957 in Edenvale, Gauteng. He studied at the University of the Western Cape, where he obtained a BA degree in 1978 and an LLB degree in 1980. He was heavily involved in setting up and running the community law clinic.

== Career ==
Navsa was admitted to the Bar in 1981 and subsequently took up employment at the Legal Resources Centre for fourteen years. He was director of the Johannesburg office from 1990 to 1994. In September 1994 he was granted senior counsel and shortly thereafter was appointed as an Acting Judge of the Supreme Court. Navsa was appointed to the bench in the Transvaal Division of the Supreme Court on 1 July 1995.

He was appointed to the bench of the Supreme Court of Appeal with effect from 9 December 2000 and acted as Constitutional Court judge during 2008. During 2015, Navsa acted as the deputy President of the Supreme Court of Appeal.
