= Glenister v President (2011) =

South African legal case

- Court: Constitutional Court of South Africa
- Full case name: Glenister v President of the Republic of South Africa and Others
- Decided: 17 March 2011
- Docket nos.: CCT 48/10
- Citations: [2011] ZACC 6; 2011 (3) SA 347 (CC); 2011 (7) BCLR 651 (CC)

Case history
- Prior actions: High Court of South Africa, Western Cape Division – Glenister v President of South Africa and Others [2010] ZAWCHC 92
- Related actions: Glenister v President of the Republic of South Africa and Others [2013] ZACC 20 (costs)

Court membership
- Judges sitting: Ngcobo CJ, Moseneke DCJ, Cameron J, Froneman J, Mogoeng J, Nkabinde J, Skweyiya J, Yacoob J and Brand AJ

Case opinions
- Decision by: Moseneke DCJ and Cameron J (Froneman, Nkabinde, and Skweyiya concurring)
- Dissent: Ngcobo CJ (Brand, Mogoeng, and Yacoob concurring)

Glenister v President of the Republic of South Africa and Others, often known as Glenister II, is a 2011 decision of the Constitutional Court of South Africa, in which the court held that the state is constitutionally obligated to establish and maintain an independent agency to combat corruption. It ruled that the Hawks were not sufficiently independent to fulfil this obligation and that the statutory provisions that created the Hawks were therefore, and to that extent, constitutionally invalid. The case was part of a series of litigation that sought to challenge the disbanding of the Scorpions.

== Background ==
The case concerned the constitutional validity of two pieces of national legislation promulgated on 27 January 2009, which disbanded the Scorpions, a specialist anti-corruption unit of the National Prosecuting Authority. The laws were the National Prosecuting Authority Amendment Act 56 of 2008 and the South African Police Service Amendment Act 57 of 2008. Among other things, the latter act amended the South African Police Service Act 68 of 1995 to insert a new chapter 6A, which established the Hawks (formally the Directorate for Priority Crime Investigation) to replace the Scorpions; the Hawks were to be located within the South African Police Service, rather than within the National Prosecuting Authority.

The matter was a sequel to Glenister I, a 2008 case of the same name in which the applicant, businessman Hugh Glenister, had attempted unsuccessfully to challenge the legislation while it was still pending in draft form before Parliament. His challenge to the enacted legislation was first heard in the Western Cape High Court, where it was dismissed; thereafter, Glenister applied both for leave to appeal the High Court's judgment and, alternatively, for direct access to the Constitutional Court to plead his constitutional challenge. The Constitutional Court heard the application on 2 September 2010, and it delivered judgment on 17 March 2011.

== Judgments ==
With the bench split five-to-four, the Constitutional Court filed two opinions. Deputy Chief Justice Dikgang Moseneke and Justice Edwin Cameron co-wrote the majority opinion, in which Justices Johan Froneman, Bess Nkabinde, and Thembile Skweyiya concurred; they upheld Glenister's appeal in part. Chief Justice Sandile Ngcobo wrote a dissenting opinion, which was joined by Acting Justice Fritz Brand and Justices Mogoeng Mogoeng and Zak Yacoob; the minority would have dismissed the appeal and Glenister's constitutional challenge in its entirety.

For reasons set out in Ngcobo's judgment, the Constitutional Court granted leave to appeal and dismissed Glenister's broad challenge, holding that it was not in itself unconstitutional for Parliament to abolish the Scorpions and establish the Hawks. However, as set out in Moseneke and Cameron's judgment, the majority held that the Constitution obligates the state "to establish and maintain an independent body to combat corruption and organised crime"; they also held that the Hawks were not sufficiently independent to fulfil this requirement. For that reason, the majority declared that Chapter 6A of the amended South African Police Service Act was inconsistent with the Constitution. The declaration of invalidity was suspended for 18 months in order to give Parliament the opportunity to remedy the defect.

== 2013 costs order ==
A related judgment of the same name was handed down by the Constitutional Court on 14 June 2013 after Glenister's attorney applied, in terms of the Uniform Rules of Court, for an amendment of the costs order handed down in Glenister II. The costs judgment, written per curiam, refused this application.
