= Sandile Ngcobo =

South African judge

The Honourable Sandile Ngcobo

Chief Justice of South Africa
- In office 12 October 2009 – 14 August 2011
- Appointed by: Jacob Zuma
- Deputy: Dikgang Moseneke
- Preceded by: Pius Langa
- Succeeded by: Mogoeng Mogoeng

Justice of the Constitutional Court
- In office 15 August 1999 – 14 August 2011
- Appointed by: Nelson Mandela
- Preceded by: John Didcott
- Succeeded by: Raymond Zondo

Judge of the Supreme Court
- In office September 1996 – August 1999
- Appointed by: Nelson Mandela
- Division: Cape Provincial Division

Personal details
- Born: 1 March 1953 (age 73) Durban, Natal Province; Union of South Africa
- Spouse: Zandile Ngcobo
- Education: University of Zululand; University of Natal; Harvard Law School

Sandile Ngcobo (born 1 March 1953) is a retired South African judge who was the Chief Justice of South Africa from October 2009 to August 2011. He served in the Constitutional Court of South Africa from August 1999 until his retirement in August 2011. Before that, he was a judge of the Cape Provincial Division and the Labour Appeal Court.

Born in Durban, Ngcobo split his legal career between his hometown and the United States. In South Africa, he was admitted as an attorney in 1981 and as an advocate in 1988, and he practised primarily in labour law and public interest law. After the end of apartheid, President Nelson Mandela appointed him to the Supreme Court of South Africa in September 1996, to the Labour Appeal Court in November 1997, and, in May 1999, to the Constitutional Court, where he succeeded the late Justice John Didcott. He also served on the amnesty committee of the Truth and Reconciliation Commission between 1998 and 1999.

After ten years on the bench, Ngcobo was elevated to the Office of the Chief Justice in 2011, nominated by President Jacob Zuma to succeed Chief Justice Pius Langa. He retired two years later after Zuma controversially, and unsuccessfully, attempted to extend his term five years beyond the standard maximum.

== Early life and education ==
Ngcobo was born on 1 March 1953 in Durban in the former Natal Province. After matriculating, he was a clerk at Barclays Bank in 1975. Thereafter, supported by a scholarship from Barclays, he attended the University of Zululand, where he completed a BProc in 1975. He later completed an LLB at the University of Natal in 1985 and an LLM at Harvard Law School in 1986; he was a Fulbright Scholar and a Harvard Law School Human Rights Fellow.

== Legal career ==
Ngcobo graduated from the University of Zululand amid the political turmoil of the mid-apartheid period, and he was arrested during the Soweto uprising of 1976 and detained without trial until July 1977; he later said that his detention was a formative experience in his legal career. Upon his release, he worked for several months at the Magistrate's office in Maphumulo, Natal, first as a clerk and later as a public prosecutor. In 1978, he became an articled clerk and then an associate attorney at KK Mthiyane and Company, Kenneth Mthiyane's Durban-based law firm. He was admitted as an attorney in 1981, and he did both civil and criminal work at the firm. He moved to the Legal Resources Centre, also in Durban, in 1982. The Centre focused on public interest litigation, particularly cases involving apartheid legislation and including matters before the Supreme Court of South Africa.

After studying towards his LLB at the University of Natal from 1983 to 1985, he moved to the United States for further education. After completing an orientation course on American law at the Georgetown University Law Center, he enrolled at Harvard Law School, concentrating on constitutional law, labour law, and international law. He graduated with his LLM in 1986. From July 1986 to July 1987, he clerked for A. Leon Higginbotham Jr. in the United States Court of Appeals for the Third Circuit. He was also Higginbotham's research associate at the University of Pennsylvania during that period. Thereafter he was a visiting foreign attorney, specialising in labour law, at Pepper, Hamilton & Scheetz in Philadelphia.

At the beginning of 1988, Ngcobo returned to Durban, where he gained admittance as an advocate. Having formerly served several stints as a visiting lecturer, he joined the University of Natal as the acting director of its Legal Aid Services Clinic. Then, through 1989, he practised as an advocate in Durban. At the end of that year, however, he returned to Pepper, Hamilton & Scheetz as an associate attorney with a labour and immigration law practice. After three more years in Philadelphia, he returned permanently to South Africa in 1992 during the negotiations to end apartheid. He returned to the Durban Bar, establishing a generalist practice as an advocate but retaining his specialism in labour law. In 1993, he became coordinator of the Equal Opportunities Project of the Centre for Socio-Legal Studies at the University of Natal, and in the same year he was appointed to the now-defunct Industrial Court of KwaZulu. The following year, during South Africa's first post-apartheid elections, he was a presiding officer in the Independent Electoral Commission's Electoral Tribunal, and in April 1996 he was appointed to a term as an acting judge of the Supreme Court's Cape Provincial Division.

== Cape Supreme Court: 1996–1999 ==
Ngcobo's stint as an acting judge ended in August 1996, and the following month he was permanently appointed to the bench in the same division (later renamed the Cape High Court). He spent three years in that court. During that period, he was also seconded to the Labour Appeal Court; he was an acting judge there throughout 1997, gained permanent appointment in November 1997, and acted as judge president in 1999. In addition, from February 1998, he served on the amnesty committee of the Truth and Reconciliation Commission.

== Constitutional Court: 1999–2011 ==
In April 1999, Ngcobo was interviewed in Cape Town as a potential candidate for appointment to succeed the late John Didcott as a justice of the Constitutional Court of South Africa. Though Edwin Cameron was viewed as the favourite candidate among the legal fraternity, President Nelson Mandela confirmed Ngcobo's appointment on 30 May 1999. He served a full 12-year term in the court.

He wrote the Constitutional Court's opinion in the landmark Doctors for Life v Speaker of the National Assembly, a 2006 challenge to the Choice on Termination of Pregnancy Act which demarcated the scope of the constitutional right to public participation in lawmaking, and in Albutt v Centre for the Study of Violence and Reconciliation, on victim participation in presidential pardons. Other notable matters in which Ngcobo wrote the majority judgement included Hoffmann v South African Airways, on discrimination in South African labour law; S v Singo, on criminal procedure; Barkhuizen v Napier, in contract law; and President v M & G Media, in administrative law.

More controversially, in 2008, Ngcobo dissented from the majority's judgement in Thint v NDPP, which upheld several search warrants issued against President Jacob Zuma in Zuma's long-running corruption prosecution. Analyst Pierre de Vos later suggested that Ngcobo's defence of Zuma in that case might have gained political notice, establishing him as a potential candidate for promotion, and the Mail & Guardian said that this suspicion prevailed throughout Ngcobo's tenure in the court. More generally, Ngcobo was often viewed as a conservative judge, and his critics accused him of executive bias. His majority judgment in S v Jordan, on the criminalisation of prostitution, was unpopular with feminist commentators, as was his concurrence in Volks v Robinson.

=== Chief Justice: 2009–2011 ===
Ahead of Pius Langa's resignation as Chief Justice of South Africa in 2009, Ngcobo was initially viewed as an "outsider" for the position, with Deputy Chief Justice Dikgang Moseneke viewed as the overwhelming favourite to succeed Langa. However, on 6 August 2009, President Zuma announced that Ngcobo was his sole nominee for elevation to Langa's position, saying that Ngcobo had "more experience" than Moseneke. Three major opposition parties – the Democratic Alliance, the Congress of the People, and the Independent Democrats – released a joint statement objecting to Zuma's announcement, claiming that the opposition had not been consulted on the nomination. They also expressed a preference for Moseneke over Ngcobo. However, Ngcobo was interviewed by the Judicial Service Commission in September, in a discussion which focused on Ngcobo's views on the importance of judicial integrity and equal access to justice. His appointment was confirmed by Zuma on 1 October 2009.

Ngcobo was often described as an "imperial" and "intimidating" Chief Justice, in contrast to his more "egalitarian" predecessors, Pius Langa and Arthur Chaskalson. However, he was lauded for his administrative skills, as well as for the series of judicial reforms which he launched during his brief tenure in the office. These included proposals to empower the Office of the Chief Justice, proposals to amend the Constitution to expand access to the Constitutional Court, and a draft judicial code of conduct.

=== Retirement: 2011 ===
Upon his appointment as Chief Justice, Ngcobo was only two years away from mandatory retirement, sparking speculation that President Zuma intended for his term to serve as a stopgap ahead of the appointment of a more controversial successor, such as John Hlophe. However, in mid-2011, as Ngcobo's retirement approached, rumours circulated that Zuma was considering extending Ngcobo's term, an unusual measure. Indeed, on 3 June, Zuma announced that Ngcobo had agreed, at his request, to serve five additional years as Chief Justice, an extension that would be effected in terms of Section 8(a) of the Judges Remuneration and Conditions of Employment Act. The announcement was highly controversial: while some observers, like commentator Richard Calland, supported the move, others strongly opposed it on the grounds that a presidential extension derogated a parliamentary power and undermined judicial independence.

The Centre for Applied Legal Studies, based at the University of the Witwatersrand, spearheaded an application against the extension and the underlying legal provision, which was heard in the Constitutional Court in July 2011. In addition, while the court's judgement was pending, the Cabinet initiated a legislative amendment to the Judges Remuneration Act which would explicitly provide for an extension to the Chief Justice's term. However, on 27 July, Ngcobo announced that he had withdrawn his acceptance of the extension and that he would instead retire the following month as initially planned. Justice Minister Jeff Radebe that that, "Ngcobo said he found it undesirable for a chief justice to be party in litigation involving the question of whether or not he should continue to hold office as this detracts from the integrity of the office of the chief justice and the esteem in which it is held". Two days later, the Constitutional Court handed down its judgement in the challenge to the extension, finding unanimously that Section 8(a) of the Judges Remuneration Act was unconstitutional and that Zuma lacked the authority to extend a Constitutional Court judge's term of office.

On 12 August 2011, ahead of a farewell ceremony, Ngcobo handed down his final judgement in the court in the matter of Limpopo Premier v Limpopo Speaker, an administrative law matter which overruled the Limpopo Provincial Legislature's attempt to pass provincial financial management legislation without the assent of the Premier of Limpopo.

== Retirement ==
In his retirement, Ngcobo continued his public service by chairing several high-profile judicial inquiries in South Africa. In 2013, he was appointed by President Zuma to chair the newly established Presidential Remuneration Review Commission; between 2014 and 2019, he chaired the Competition Commission's Health Market Inquiry into the private healthcare sector; and, in 2021, Health Minister Zweli Mkhize appointed him to chair the no-fault compensation fund established to compensate adverse events suffered by COVID-19 vaccine users. Finally, in September 2022, the Speaker of the National Assembly, Nosiviwe Mapisa-Nqakula, appointed him as chairperson of the independent panel which Parliament tasked with investigating whether the Phala Phala scandal provided possible grounds for impeaching President Cyril Ramaphosa. The three-person panel found that Ramaphosa "has a case to answer".

Internationally, Ngcobo is the president of the Arbitration Foundation of Southern Africa's International Court, and he has acted as a judge of appeal in the Supreme Court of Namibia.

== Academic appointments ==
Before his appointment to the bench, Ngcobo occasionally served as a part-time lecturer at the University of Natal, teaching race legislation in 1988 and constitutional litigation in 1995. He was made an honorary professor at the University of Cape Town in February 1999. In subsequent decades, he was a visiting professor at several law schools in the United States, including the New York University School of Law, Columbia Law School, and Harvard Law School.

== Personal life ==
He is married to Zandile Ngcobo, with whom he has two sons and a daughter. He speaks English, Afrikaans, Zulu, and Xhosa, and also knows Latin.

Legal offices
Preceded by Pius Langa	Chief Justice of South Africa; 2009–2011	Succeeded by Mogoeng Mogoeng
