= Edwin Cameron =

South African judge (born 1953)

The Honourable Edwin Cameron SCOB
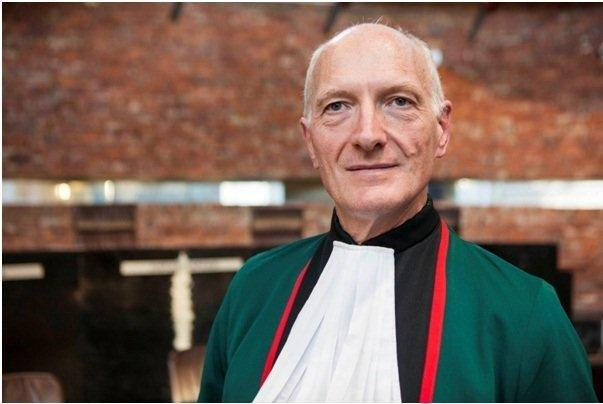

Justice of the Constitutional Court of South Africa
- In office 1 January 2009 – 20 August 2019
- Appointed by: President Kgalema Motlanthe

Judge of the Supreme Court of Appeal
- In office July 2000 – 31 December 2008
- Appointed by: President Thabo Mbeki

Acting Judge of the Constitutional Court of South Africa
- In office August 1999 – May 2000

Judge of the Witwatersrand Local Division
- In office 1 January 1995 – July 2000
- Appointed by: President Nelson Mandela

Chancellor of Stellenbosch University
- In office 1 January 2020 – Current

Personal details
- Born: 15 February 1953 (age 73) Pretoria, Union of South Africa
- Education: Stellenbosch University; Keble College, Oxford; University of South Africa

Edwin Cameron SCOB (born 15 February 1953 in Pretoria) is a retired judge who served as a Justice of the Constitutional Court of South Africa. He is well known for his HIV/AIDS and gay-rights activism and was hailed by Nelson Mandela as "one of South Africa's new heroes". President Ramaphosa appointed him as Inspecting Judge of Correctional Services from 1 January 2020 and in October 2019 he was elected Chancellor of Stellenbosch University.

== Early life ==
Cameron was born in Pretoria. His father was imprisoned for car theft and his mother did not have the means to support him. He therefore spent much of his childhood in an orphanage in Queenstown. His elder sister was killed when Cameron was seven.

Cameron won a scholarship to attend Pretoria Boys High School, one of South Africa's best state schools, and reinvented himself, he says, "in the guise of a clever schoolboy". Thereafter he went to Stellenbosch University, studying Latin and classics. While studying here, he resided at Wilgenhof Mens Residence. After this he attended Oxford University as a Rhodes Scholar. There he switched to law and earned a BA in Jurisprudence and the Bachelor of Civil Law, winning the Vinerian Scholarship. When he returned to South Africa he completed an LLB at the University of South Africa and was its best law graduate.

Cameron's early career combined academia and legal practice. In 1982, he famously wrote a scathing critique of the late Chief Justice L. C. Steyn, then a darling of the apartheid establishment. And, in 1987, Cameron argued that three senior South African judges, including its former Chief Justice, Pierre Rabie, ought to resign to preserve the legitimacy of the judiciary. Cameron practised at the Johannesburg Bar from 1983 to 1994. From 1986 he was a human rights lawyer at Wits's Centre for Applied Legal Studies, where in 1989 he was awarded a personal professorship in law. Cameron's practice included labour and employment law; defence of African National Congress fighters charged with treason; conscientious and religious objection; land tenure and forced removals; and gay and lesbian equality. In 1992 he became a co-author (with Tony Honoré, one of his mentors at Oxford) of Honoré's South African Law of Trusts. Cameron took silk in 1994.

== Judicial career ==
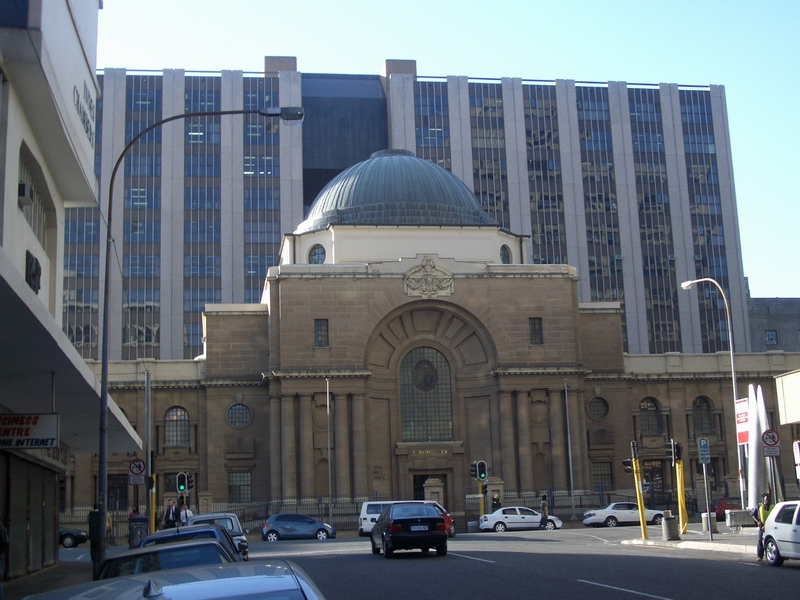
The Witwatersrand Local Division (now the South Gauteng High Court) in Johannesburg

=== High Court ===
In October 1994, President Nelson Mandela appointed Cameron as an acting judge of the High Court to chair a commission of inquiry into illegal arms sales by Armscor, operating as the sales arm of the SANDF, to Yemen. Cameron's report was described as a "hard-hitting" critique of Armscor's conduct, but was quickly eclipsed by myriad other allegations about the South African government's illegal arms trades.

Cameron was appointed permanently to the Witwatersrand Local Division in 1995. His best-known judgment in this capacity is Holomisa v Argus Newspapers Ltd, where Bantu Holomisa had brought a defamation suit against The Star for alleging that he had been "directly involved" in the infiltration into South Africa of an Azanian People's Liberation Army "hit squad" aimed at "killing whites". Cameron's judgment was described as a "most rigorous exposition" of the Constitution's application to private disputes and a "landmark" defence of free speech. Others, while acknowledging the judgment had departed importantly from apartheid-era law, said it should have gone further in protecting journalists. Cameron's position was substantially confirmed, in subsequent cases, by the Supreme Court of Appeal.

=== Supreme Court of Appeal ===
In 1999, Cameron was given an acting stint on the Constitutional Court, during which he partook in its seminal judgments in Pharmaceutical Manufacturers and Grootboom and wrote the Liquor Bill judgment on provincial legislative powers — the first, and still the only, case to be referred to the Court by the President of South Africa under section 79 of the Constitution. The Judicial Service Commission had recommended that Cameron be permanently appointed, but Sandile Ngcobo was ultimately preferred due to the late intercession of Thabo Mbeki, then Deputy President, who felt the appointee should be black. Cameron has said there is "no doubt" this was the correct decision.

Cameron was instead appointed to the Supreme Court of Appeal (at the same time as Mahomed Navsa and Robert Nugent), where he served for eight years. There he wrote leading judgments on legal causation, hearsay evidence, public contracts and contempt of court. In Minister of Finance v Gore, Cameron co-authored a judgment with Fritz Brand that held the state could be delictually liable for causing pure economic loss by fraud.

=== Constitutional Court ===
On 31 December 2008 President Kgalema Motlanthe appointed Cameron to the Constitutional Court, taking effect from 1 January 2009. He was considered a crucial member of the Court's progressive wing. He has been described as a "jurist of the highest order", "the greatest legal mind of his generation" and "in a league of his own".

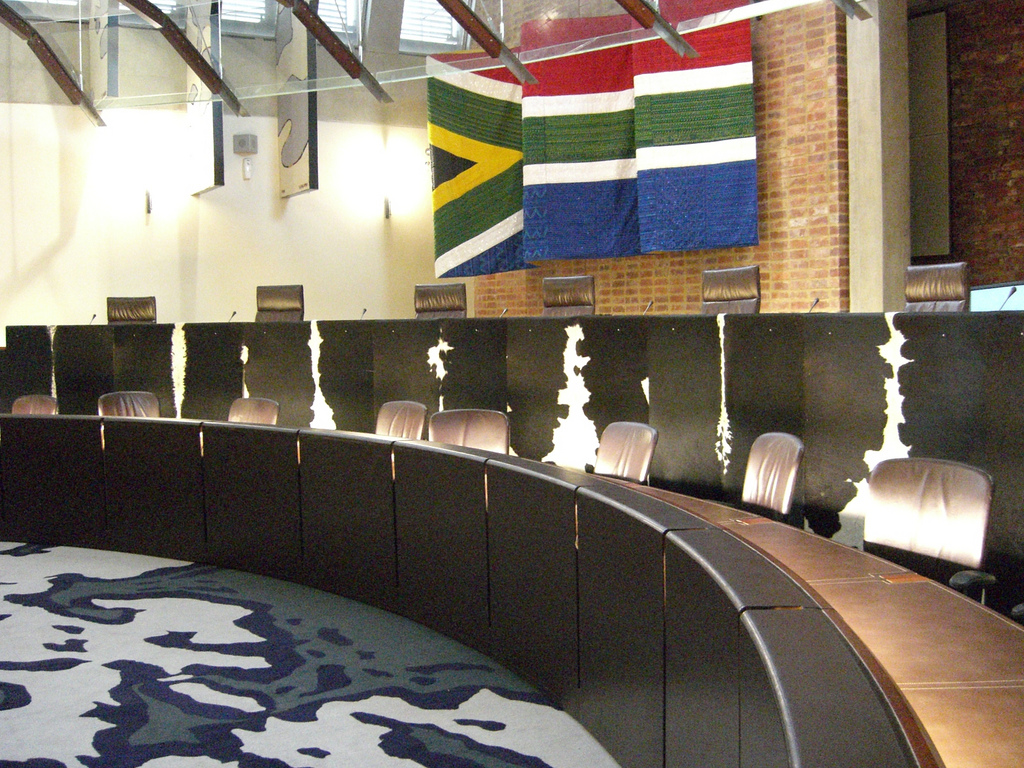
The courtroom of the Constitutional Court of South Africa

Cameron's judgment in Glenister v President, co-authored with Deputy Chief Justice Dikgang Moseneke, struck down amendments to the National Prosecuting Act and South African Police Service Act on the basis that they failed to create an "adequately independent" anti-corruption unit. This was praised as an "imaginative" and "brilliant" judgment by commentators and means South Africa must have an independent corruption-fighting agency notwithstanding the ruling ANC's controversial disbanding of the Scorpions.

Also well-known are Cameron's judgments on defamation law and free speech:

- In The Citizen v McBride, Cameron's majority judgment enlarged the scope of the fair comment defence and substantially excused The Citizen from liability to Robert McBride for calling him a "murderer" unsuited for public office, even though McBride had received amnesty for the murders in question.
- Le Roux v Dey, handed down in 2012, concerned three schoolboys who had superimposed an image of their deputy principal's face on the naked body of one man masturbating alongside another. The Constitutional Court's majority judgment held the image was defamatory of the deputy principal. Cameron, however, in a judgment co-authored with Justice Froneman, dissented on this point, saying it could not be actionable to imply someone is gay. Leading commentators praised this conclusion. Others, however, criticised Cameron's "schizophrenic" judgment for holding that the picture had nevertheless actionably harmed the plaintiff's dignity by suggesting he engaged in "sexually promiscuous or exhibitionist" conduct.
- In Democratic Alliance v African National Congress, handed down in 2015, Cameron's majority judgment, co-authored with Justices Froneman and Khampepe, dismissed the ruling ANC's claim against the opposition Democratic Alliance for stating in a bulk SMS that Public Protector Thuli Madonsela's report shows how President Zuma "stole" taxpayers' money to build his Nkandla home. The judgment was "hailed as a victory for freedom of expression during election campaigns", though some thought it risked conceptual muddiness.

Cameron retired on 20 August 2019, the 25th anniversary of his appointment to the bench.

== Activism ==
=== LGBTIQ+ rights ===
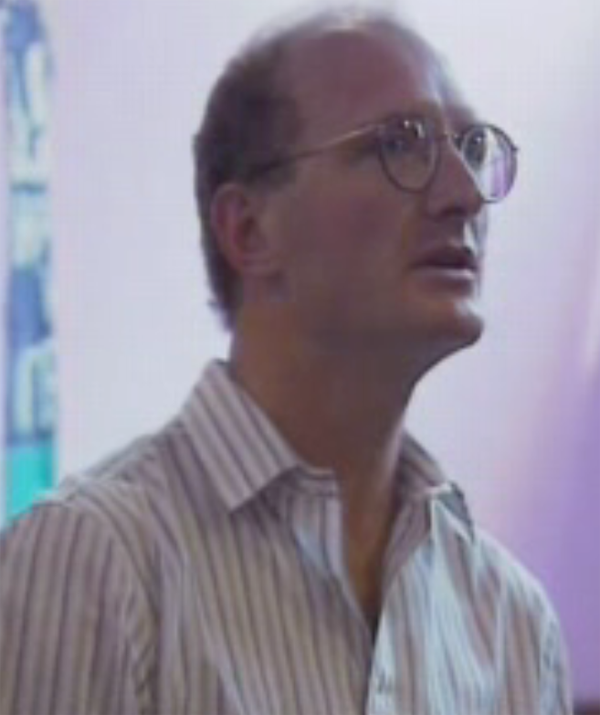
Cameron at the first pride parade in South Africa

Cameron has been openly gay since the early 1980s. He addressed the crowd in the first pride parade in South Africa held in Johannesburg on 13 October 1990. Thereafter he oversaw the gay and lesbian movement's submissions to the drafters of the South African Constitution and was instrumental in securing the inclusion of an express prohibition on discrimination on the basis of sexual orientation. He is one of 29 signatories to the Yogyakarta Principles. He also was a founding member of the Society for Homosexuals on Campus, a student organization at the University of the Witwatersrand, which later became known as Activate Wits.

1995 saw the publication of Defiant Desire: Gay and Lesbian Lives in South Africa, "a celebration of the lives of gay men and lesbians in South Africa" which Cameron co-edited with Mark Gevisser.

=== HIV/AIDS ===
From 1988 Cameron advised the National Union of Mineworkers on HIV/AIDS, and helped draft and negotiate the industry's first comprehensive AIDS agreement with the Chamber of Mines. While at the Centre for Applied Legal Studies, he co-drafted the Charter of Rights on AIDS and HIV, co-founded the AIDS Consortium (a national affiliation of non-governmental organizations working in AIDS), which he chaired for its first three years, and founded and was the first director of the AIDS Law Project.

Cameron had himself contracted HIV in the 1980s and became extremely ill with AIDS when working as a High Court judge. His salary allowed him to afford anti-retroviral treatment, which saved his life. Cameron's realisation that he owed his life to his relative wealth caused him to become a prominent HIV/AIDS activist in post-apartheid South Africa, urging its government to provide treatment to all. He has strongly criticised President Thabo Mbeki's AIDS-denialist policies. Cameron was the first, and remains the only, senior South African official to state publicly that he is living with HIV/AIDS.

His prize-winning first memoir, Witness to AIDS, is about his struggle with the illness. It has been published in South Africa, the UK, the US and in translation in Germany and in China. His second memoir, Justice: A Personal Account, urges that the best path forward to a more just society in South Africa is through the Constitution and the rule of law. Justice has been translated into Chinese, and has been published in translation in Korean and Italian.

=== Decriminalization of sex work ===
Cameron has been a staunch supporter of the full decriminalization of sex work. His advocacy and activism has sought to link criminalization, discrimination and stigma, and more recently how these link to Sustainable Development Goal 16. In 2008, at the 17th International AIDS Conference held in Mexico, Cameron called for a sustained and vocal campaign against HIV criminalization. At the 21st International Aids Conference, held in 2016 in Durban, South Africa, Cameron expanded on the call for decriminalization of HIV, stating "[t]he biggest problem is stigma. Stigma, stigma, stigma, stigma. Stigma remains a barrier to prevention, it remains a barrier to behavior change, it remains a barrier to people accessing treatment." During the same speech, Cameron invited any sex workers present to join him on stage and indicated that sex work is "one of the most dangerous and despised occupations, and one that deserves our support and our respect and our love." He further stated "Sex workers are perhaps the most reviled group in human history - indispensable to a portion of mostly heterosexual males in society, but despised, marginalized, persecuted, beaten up and imprisoned. Sex workers work. Their work is work with dignity."

In July 2019, at a UNAIDS Press Conference, Cameron linked activism against criminalization, discrimination and stigma, to achieving Sustainable Development Goal 16 where he stated "Almost all countries have some form of criminal prohibition on sex work. [...] criminalization has severe consequences taking people outside of areas of protection. It declares [the criminalized group's] actions or identity illegitimate, and increases stigma. It excludes them from protections that our judicial, social and economic systems may provide. UNAIDS data indicates that criminalized groups often experience high rates of violence. If you suffer criminal violence and you yourself are criminalized, in most cases you simply cannot go to the police."

=== Judicial Inspectorate for Correctional Services ===
After he retired from the Constitutional Court, President Ramaphosa appointed him as Inspecting Judge of Correctional Services. The Judicial Inspectorate of Correctional Services (JICS) is an watchdog body created during the Mandela Presidency to inspect and report on conditions in prisons, with a view to safeguarding inmates' dignity. Cameron has been active in advocating for reform of South Africa's penal and carceral system, as well as for greater independence of JICS.

=== Dealing with litigants' "Stalingrad" tactics ===
Cameron has been a vocal critic of the use of "Stalingrad" tactics in litigation. Stalingrad tactics involve "a well-resourced accused, over a protracted period, postponing or frustrating the trial process... by deploying every possible legal argument and stratagem to thwart the prosecution." Cameron has argued that these tactics harm the administration of justice and exacerbate overcrowding in the prison system. Cameron has proposed a range of solutions, including firmer institutional discipline and, in exceptional cases, the imposition of time limits on the start and finalisation of criminal trials.

== Awards ==
Cameron's awards include the Nelson Mandela Award for Health and Human Rights (2000); Stellenbosch University's Alumnus Award; Transnet's HIV/AIDS Champions Award; and the San Francisco AIDS Foundation Excellence in Leadership Award. In 2008 he served as a member of the Jury of the Red Ribbon Award, a partnership of the UNAIDS Family. He is the 2009–2010 winner of the Brudner Prize from Yale University, awarded annually to an accomplished scholar or activist whose work has made significant contributions to the understanding of LGBT issues or furthered the tolerance of LGBT people. In 2019, Cameron was awarded the Asijiki Award for Service and Humanity from the Asijiki Coalition, which advocates for the decriminalization of sex work in South Africa.

In 2002 the Bar of England and Wales honoured him with a Special Award for his contribution to international jurisprudence and human rights. He is an honorary fellow of the Institute of Advanced Legal Studies, London, and Keble College, Oxford; and was a visiting fellow of All Souls College, Oxford in 2003–04, researching "Aspects of the AIDS Epidemic, examining in particular the denialist stance supported by SA President Mbeki". In 2009 Cameron was appointed as an Honorary Master of the Bench of the Honourable Society of the Middle Temple. Cameron is also an Honorary Member of the American Academy of Arts and Sciences (2016). He has seven honorary doctorates (King's College London (2008), Wits University (2009), University of Oxford (2011), University of St Andrews (2012), Stellenbosch University (2015), University of Sussex (2016) and Stetson University, Florida (2021).

Cameron was, until 2015, the general secretary of the Rhodes Scholarships in Southern Africa and is a patron of the Oxford University Commonwealth Law Journal. Between 1998 and 2008, Cameron chaired the Council of the University of the Witwatersrand. He has been an active and involved patron of the Guild Cottage Children's Home since 1997, and is also patron of the Soweto HIV/AIDS Counselors' Association and Community AIDS Response. In January 2020 he became the Chancellor of Stellenbosch University.

In 2021 he was awarded the Order of the Baobab (Gold), South Africa's highest civilian honour, for his contribution to the judicial system, as well as his "tireless campaigning against the stigma of HIV and AIDS, and the rights of lesbian, gay, bisexual, transgender, queer, intersex and asexual (LGBTQIA+) communities".

== Media ==
Cameron's critical role in the battle for access to antiretroviral treatment in Africa and other parts of the global south is portrayed in the award-winning documentary Fire in the Blood.

== Controversies ==
Cameron was the subject of a complaint to the Judicial Service Commission, alleging that he had failed to declare a potential conflict of interest in relation to a case before the Constitutional Court. Cameron was approached in 2019 by the vice chancellor of Stellenbosch University to offer him the position of university chancellor while a case was pending before the Court on the university's language policy. Cameron declined the offer and offered the parties full disclosure of all pertinent correspondence and contacts. The offer of disclosure was not taken up by either party until after the ruling on the matter, when the losing party belatedly sought and was granted access. The Court ruled unanimously in favour of Stellenbosch University in a judgment written by Cameron. The Judicial Service Commission dismissed the complaint against Cameron in 2020, finding that the complaint lacked substance. Cameron subsequently accepted and took up the post of Chancellor.

In 2023, Cameron appeared before Parliament during enquiries into the May 2022 escape of convicted rapist and murderer Thabo Bester. When DA MP Glynnis Breytenbach asked Cameron why JICS had not informed the public of Bester's escape, Cameron revealed that he had provided publicly available information relating to the matter to GroundUp, a public interest, not-for-profit news agency. Cameron indicated that he approached GroundUp after becoming frustrated with the slow pace of the investigations and lack of urgency to apprehend Bester. He provided GroundUp with a High Court interdict launched by Bester's alleged accomplice, Nandipha Magudumana, and a High Court judges' report which mentioned the results of the post-mortem of the body found in Bester's cell. This was confirmed by GroundUp editor, Nathan Geffen, in an editorial for News24. GroundUp later obtained post mortem results from public court documents. Cameron was a board member of GroundUp at the time, which is an unpaid position with no role in editorial decisions.

== See also ==
- List of Constitutional Court opinions of Edwin Cameron

== Publications ==
- Defiant Desire: Gay and Lesbian Lives in South Africa (ed), Routledge, London: 1993 (with Mark Gevisser).
- Witness to AIDS, Tafelberg, Cape Town: 2005 (with two chapters co-written by Nathan Geffen).
- Justice: A Personal Account , Tafelberg, Cape Town: 2014.
- Honore's South African Law of Trusts: 2018 (sixth edition).
- Behind Prisons Walls: Unlocking a Safer South Africa, Tafelberg, Cape Town: 2025 (with Rebecca Gore and Sohela Surajpal).
