= Dikgang Moseneke =

South African judge

The Honourable Dikgang Moseneke
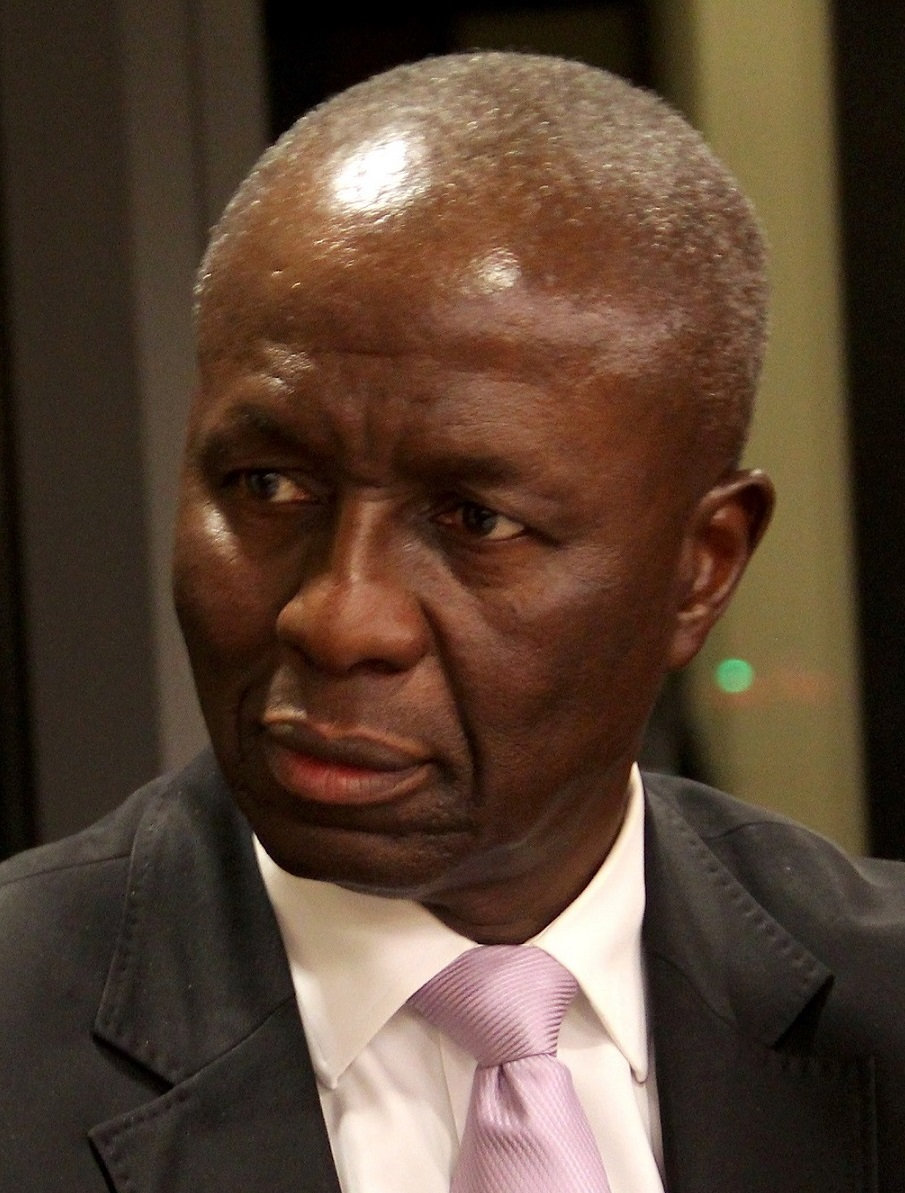

3rd Deputy Chief Justice of South Africa
- In office 1 June 2005 – 20 May 2016
- Chief Justice: Pius Langa; Sandile Ngcobo; Mogoeng Mogoeng
- Preceded by: Pius Langa
- Succeeded by: Bess Nkabinde (Acting)

Chief Justice of South Africa
- Acting
- In office 4 November 2013 – 31 March 2014
- Deputy: Thembile Skweyiya (Acting)
- Preceded by: Mogoeng Mogoeng (Chief Justice)

Justice of the Constitutional Court of South Africa
- In office 29 November 2002 – 20 May 2016
- Appointed by: Thabo Mbeki

8th Chancellor of the University of the Witwatersrand
- In office 7 September 2006 – 1 December 2018
- Vice-Chancellor: Adam Habib
- Preceded by: Richard Goldstone
- Succeeded by: Judy Dlamini

Personal details
- Born: 20 December 1947 (age 78) Pretoria, Union of South Africa
- Spouse: Khabo Moseneke
- Children: 3
- Education: University of South Africa

Dikgang Ernest Moseneke OLG (born 20 December 1947) is a South African jurist and former Deputy Chief Justice of South Africa.

== Biography ==
Moseneke was born in Pretoria and went to school there. He joined the Pan-Africanist Congress (PAC) at the age of 14. The following year he was arrested, detained and convicted of participating in anti-apartheid activity. He spent ten years as a prisoner on Robben Island, where he met and befriended Nelson Mandela and other leading activists. While imprisoned he obtained a Bachelor of Arts in English and political science and a B.Iuris degree, and would later complete a Bachelor of Laws, all from the University of South Africa. He also served on the disciplinary committee of the prisoners' self-governed association football body, Makana F.A.

Moseneke started his professional career as an attorney's articled clerk at Klagbruns Inc in Pretoria in 1973. He was admitted as an attorney in 1976 and practised for five years at Maluleke, Seriti and Moseneke, mainly before the Company Court in liquidation matters and in criminal trials. In 1983 he was called to the Pretoria Bar. His application had sparked a dispute within the Bar which culminated in its abolishing its "whites-only" membership rule. Moseneke practised as an advocate in Johannesburg and Pretoria and was noted for his Company Law, Bankruptcy and indirect tax practice and was briefed extensively by black and Asian businessmen. He was awarded senior counsel status ten years later. Moseneke worked underground for the PAC during the 1980s and became its Deputy President when it was unbanned in 1990. Moseneke also served on the technical committee that drafted the interim constitution of 1993. In 1994 he was appointed Deputy Chairperson of the Independent Electoral Commission, which conducted the first democratic elections in South Africa.

== Judicial career ==
In September 1994, while practising as a silk, Moseneke accepted an acting appointment to the Transvaal Provincial Division. Between 1995 and 2001, however, Moseneke left the Bar to pursue a full-time corporate career, most famously as the chair of Telkom. In November 2001, Moseneke was appointed to the High Court in Pretoria, his hometown, by then President Thabo Mbeki. A year later, he was made a judge in the Constitutional Court and, in June 2005, became Deputy Chief Justice. On 4 November 2013, Moseneke was appointed Acting Chief Justice during the long-term leave of Mogoeng Mogoeng.

Moseneke was regarded as one of the strongest judges on South Africa's Constitutional Court. For example, he was praised for his "towering legal mind" and "commitment to fairness and justice" and described as "a most independent-minded and imaginative jurist". Moseneke's judgments include:

- S v Thebus, which upheld the constitutional validity of the doctrine of common purpose;
- Steenkamp NO v Provincial Tender Board, which details the relationship between public- and private-law remedies;
- Masetlha v President, which held National Intelligence Agency head Billy Masetlha was not entitled to procedural fairness when he was dismissed by then President Thabo Mbeki;
- National Treasury v Opposition to Urban Tolling Alliance, where the Court refused to grant an interim injunction to stop Gauteng's controversial e-tolls;
- Mazibuko v Sisulu, in which then leader of the opposition Lindiwe Mazibuko succeeded in obtaining an order declaring unconstitutional the parliamentary rules that allowed the National Assembly to stall, rather than proceed with, the motion of no confidence in President Jacob Zuma that she had tabled; and
- Minister of Police v Premier of the Western Cape, in which the Court found in favour of Premier of the Western Cape Helen Zille when the African National Congress sought to invalidate her creation of the Khayelitsha Commission.

Also well-known are his two leading judgments on affirmative action, Minister of Finance v Van Heerden and SAPS v Barnard.

Moseneke made a significant contribution to South African property law. He penned the Constitutional Court's last three majority judgments on the Restitution of Land Rights Act and decided a leading case on expropriation in 2014. The following year, in Shoprite v MEC, Eastern Cape, which dealt comprehensively with the meaning of the constitutional right to property, Moseneke's judgment attracted the most concurrences.

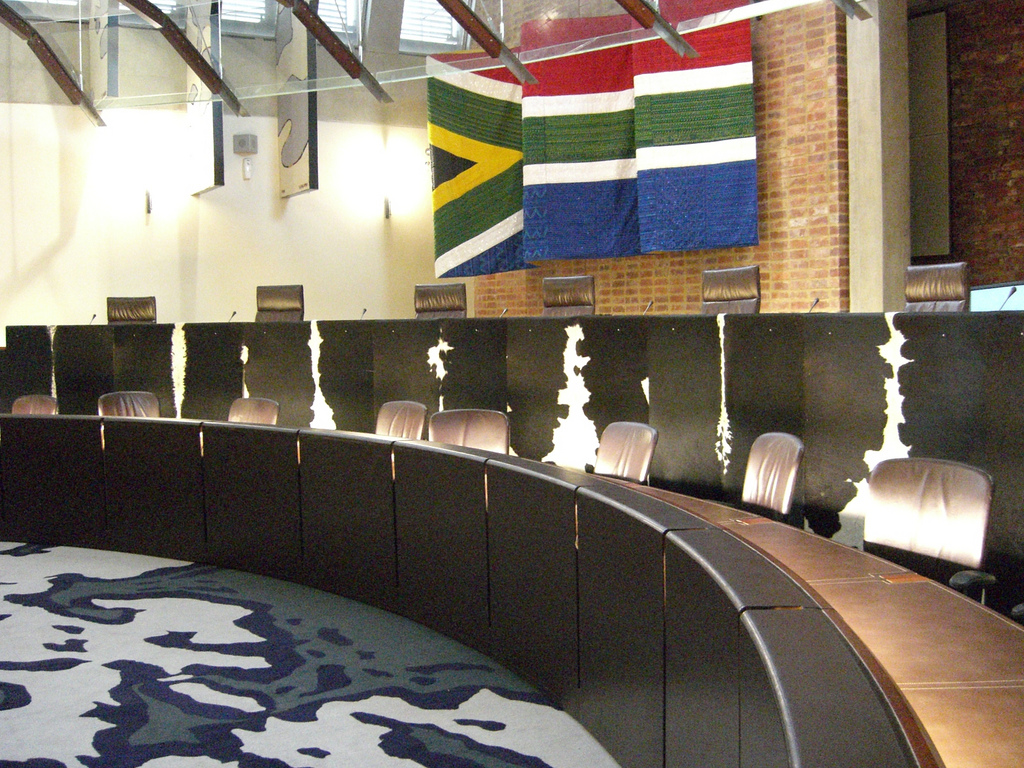
The courtroom of the Constitutional Court of South Africa

Most celebrated is Moseneke's judgment in Glenister v President, co-authored with Justice Edwin Cameron, which struck down amendments to the National Prosecuting Act and South African Police Service Act on the basis that they failed to create an "adequately independent" anti-corruption unit. This was hailed as an "imaginative" and "brilliant" judgment by commentators and means South Africa must have an independent corruption-fighting agency notwithstanding the ruling ANC's controversial disbanding of the Scorpions.

Before his judicial appointment, Moseneke had succeeded, as a litigant, in having South Africa's racially discriminatory system of estate administration declared constitutionally invalid.

Moseneke is also known for his independence. At public events, he has distanced himself from ANC interests, criticised the government's flouting of court orders, and decried the extensive powers afforded the President - in each case triggering an angry response from the ruling party. Moseneke has twice been passed over for appointment as Chief Justice, despite being the most senior judge on the Court. On the second occasion, when Mogoeng was appointed, many prominent figures said Moseneke was the better candidate, and questioned the ANC's motives in snubbing him. Mogoeng was one of the Constitutional Court's most junior members, having been appointed to it less than two years earlier, and having had a relatively short judicial career at one of the smallest High Court divisions prior to that. His nomination ahead of Moseneke reminded many of the notorious supersession by L. C. Steyn, a National Party favourite, of Oliver Schreiner. Finally, whereas Moseneke had been active in the struggle against apartheid, Mogoeng had been a prosecutor in a bantustan.

Moseneke retired from the Constitutional Court in May 2016.

=== South Africa v. Israel ===
On January 4, 2024, the South African government appointed Moseneke as an ad hoc judge to serve on the International Court of Justice case South Africa v. Israel, brought against Israel by South Africa on charges of genocide.

== Other positions and awards ==
Moseneke has seven honorary doctorates from the University of the North, University of Natal, University of Pretoria, Tshwane University of Technology, University of South Africa, University of Cape Town, Nelson Mandela University and CUNY.

In 2006, he succeeded Justice Richard Goldstone as chancellor of the University of the Witwatersrand. Moseneke was also named as an executor of the will of Nelson Mandela, who died in late 2013. He is currently chairman of the board of directors of the Johannesburg Philharmonic Orchestra.

Moseneke was the 2020 recipient of the Bolch Prize for the Rule of Law, awarded by the Bolch Judicial Institute at Duke Law School.

== See also ==
- List of Constitutional Court opinions of Dikgang Moseneke
