= Malusi Gigaba =

South African politician

The Honourable Malusi Gigaba MP
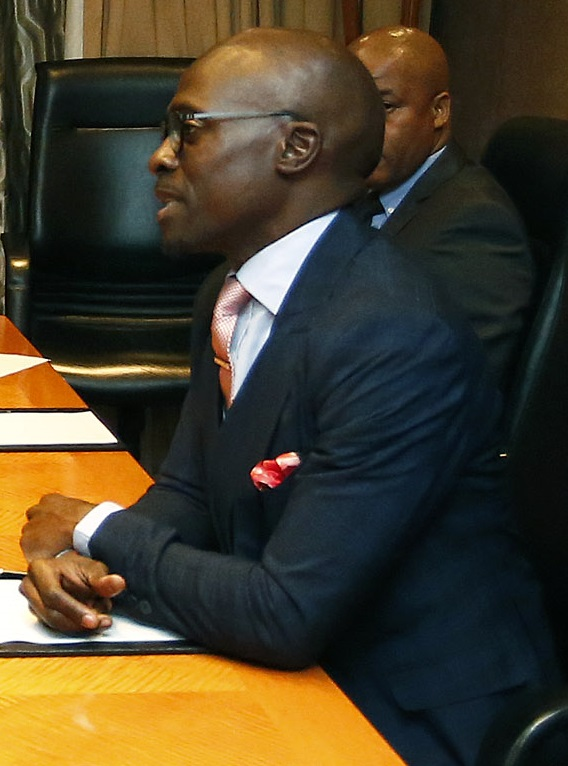
- Gigaba in 2016

Member of the National Assembly
- Incumbent
- Assumed office 14 June 2024
- In office 23 April 2004 – 15 November 2018
- In office 2 June 1999 – 19 November 2001
Government offices 2004–2018
Minister of Home Affairs
In office 27 February 2018 – 13 November 2018
President	Cyril Ramaphosa
Deputy	Fatima Chohan
Preceded by	Ayanda Dlodlo
Succeeded by	Siyabonga Cwele
In office 25 May 2014 – 31 March 2017
President	Jacob Zuma
Deputy	Fatima Chohan
Preceded by	Naledi Pandor
Succeeded by	Hlengiwe Mkhize
Minister of Finance
In office 31 March 2017 – 27 February 2018
President	Jacob Zuma
Deputy	Sfiso Buthelezi
Preceded by	Pravin Gordhan
Succeeded by	Nhlanhla Nene
Minister of Public Enterprises
In office 1 November 2010 – 25 May 2014
President	Jacob Zuma
Deputy	Ben Martins; Gratitude Magwanishe
Preceded by	Barbara Hogan
Succeeded by	Lynne Brown
Deputy Minister of Home Affairs
In office 29 April 2004 – 1 November 2010
President	Thabo Mbeki; Kgalema Motlanthe; Jacob Zuma
Minister	Nosiviwe Mapisa-Nqakula; Nkosazana Dlamini-Zuma
Preceded by	Lindiwe Sisulu
Succeeded by	Fatima Chohan

7th President of the African National Congress Youth League
- In office March 1996 – August 2004
- Deputy: Andrew Dipela; Joe Maswanganyi; Rubben Mohlaloga
- Preceded by: Lulu Johnson
- Succeeded by: Fikile Mbalula

Personal details
- Born: Knowledge Malusi Nkanyezi Gigaba; 30 August 1971 (age 55) Eshowe, Natal Province; South Africa
- Party: African National Congress
- Spouses: Thabong Nxumalo (div. 2014) Norma Mngoma (m. 2014; div. 2021)
- Education: University of Durban-Westville

Knowledge Malusi Nkanyezi Gigaba (born 30 August 1971) is a South African politician who represents the African National Congress (ANC) in the National Assembly. He served as a cabinet minister between 2010 and 2018, with stints as Minister of Home Affairs, Minister of Public Enterprises, and Minister of Finance. He returned to the National Assembly in the May 2024 general election after a hiatus from frontline politics.

Gigaba joined the government of South Africa in April 2004 as Deputy Minister of Home Affairs under President Thabo Mbeki and was promoted to the cabinet by President Jacob Zuma in October 2010. Thereafter he served as Minister of Public Enterprises from November 2010 to May 2014 and Minister of Home Affairs from May 2014 to March 2017, when Zuma controversially appointed him to replace Pravin Gordhan as Minister of Finance. Zuma's successor, President Cyril Ramaphosa, demoted him back to the home affairs portfolio in February 2018. He resigned from the government and National Assembly in November 2018 under sustained public and political pressure, arising from a finding by the High Court and Public Protector that he had lied under oath in a lawsuit brought by the Oppenheimers' Fireblade Aviation.

In 2022, the Zondo Commission recommended that Gigaba should face criminal investigation for allegedly receiving corrupt payments from the Gupta family during his tenure in the cabinet. His critics associate him closely with the project of state capture allegedly pursued by Zuma and the Guptas in that period, accusing him of using his position as public enterprises minister to interfere with the governance of state-owned enterprises. In the home affairs portfolio, a parliamentary inquiry found that Gigaba had improperly granted South African citizenship to members of the Gupta family in a naturalisation process riddled with fraud and other irregularities.

Born in Eshowe, KwaZulu-Natal, Gigaba rose to prominence as three-term president of the ANC Youth League from March 1996 to August 2004. He has been a member of the ANC National Executive Committee since December 2002 and served one term on the party's National Working Committee between 2013 and 2017. He also led the ANC's national election campaign in the 2014 general election.

== Early life and education ==
Gigaba was born on 30 August 1971 at Eshowe in Natal Province, now part of KwaZulu-Natal. He grew up in the area, attending primary school in Mandeni. The second of five siblings, he has three sisters and a brother. His family was comfortably middle-class; his father, Jabulani Gigaba, was an Anglican priest, and his mother, Nomthandazo Gigaba, was a nurse. He later said that his upbringing was "both religious and clean". He matriculated in 1988 at Vryheid State High School.

He attended the University of Durban-Westville, completing a bachelor's degree in pedagogics in 1991 and a master of arts in social policy in 1993. His master's research focused on urban affairs and policy and his dissertation, about land invasions in Cato Manor, was adapted for publication in Development Southern Africa in 1996. At the university he was a founding member of the Education Students Society and a member of the Geography Students Society.

He was also active in student anti-apartheid politics. He became politically active as a teenager in 1985 and participated in the Congress of South African Students, South African Youth Congress, and Young Christian Students. As a university student, he joined the African National Congress (ANC), ANC Youth League, and South African Communist Party (SACP) when they were unbanned in 1990 during the negotiations to end apartheid. In 1993 he was chairperson of his university's branch of the ANC-aligned South African Student Congress.

== ANC Youth League ==
Gigaba rose to political prominence in the leadership of the ANC Youth League's Southern Natal branch, serving a stint as its chairperson and becoming its provincial secretary in 1994, the year of South Africa's first democratic elections; in that capacity he was an ex officio member of the mainstream ANC's Provincial Executive Committee, then chaired by Jacob Zuma.

At a league conference in March 1996, Gigaba was elected to succeed Lulu Johnson as national president of the ANC Youth League. He became the first league president to serve three consecutive terms, gaining re-election in March 1998 and April 2001. At the 1998 conference, he defeated a leadership challenge from Lassy Chiwayo, and at the 2001 conference, apparently with the support of Peter Mokaba and other members of the league's "old guard", he defeated a leadership challenge from David Makhura and Mahlengi Bhengu.

At Mokaba's funeral in June 2002, Gigaba called for the youth to boycott the Mail & Guardian newspaper in protest of its critical reporting on Mokaba and his links to HIV/AIDS denialism.

=== Parliament: 1999–2001 ===
In 1997 Gigaba worked full-time for Macsteel as a consultant. Thereafter, between 1999 and 2001, he served half a parliamentary term as an ANC representative in the National Assembly, the lower house of the South African Parliament. Elected to the seat in the June 1999 general election, he resigned on 19 November 2001, after the April 2001 conference resolved that the league president should work on league business full-time.

=== Succession: 2004 ===
Though Gigaba's league presidency entitled him to ex officio membership of the ANC National Executive Committee, he was directly elected to a five-year term on the committee at the ANC's 51st National Conference in Stellenbosch in December 2002. By number of votes received, he was ranked 39th of the 60 members elected to the committee. Ahead of the conference, he had been a vocal supporter of ANC president Thabo Mbeki's successful bid for re-election, declaring that, "The positions of president and his deputy are sacrosanct – there will be no challengers".

At the league's next conference in August 2004, Gigaba did not stand for re-election as league president, ceding the office to his secretary-general, Fikile Mbalula. Gigaba and Mbalula were reportedly close confidantes who had planned their political careers together.

As league president, Gigaba was frequently criticized for the league's uncritical support of the mainstream ANC's national leadership under Mbeki, with opponents labelling him Mbeki's "lapdog". However, he graduated from the league with an excellent reputation among observers of ANC politics. Regarded both as politically gifted and as highly ambitious, he was "earmarked as among the best young leaders to come out of the organisation". His supporters widely viewed him as a potential future president of South Africa.

== National executive ==
=== Home Affairs: 2004–2010 ===
In the April 2004 general election, Gigaba returned to the ANC's caucus in the National Assembly. Announcing his second-term cabinet on 28 April 2004, President Mbeki appointed Gigaba to serve as Deputy Minister of Home Affairs under Minister Nosiviwe Mapisa-Nqakula. The Mail & Guardian described his appointment as "Mbeki's overture to the youth". He remained in the portfolio for the next six years, serving through the remainder of Mbeki's presidency, the entirety of Kgalema Motlanthe's presidency, and the first eighteen months of Jacob Zuma's presidency.

==== Public Protector investigation ====
In 2007, Gigaba caused a minor scandal when there were reports that he had sent R1,020 worth of flowers to his wife at the expense of the Department of Home Affairs. Gigaba said that the flowers had been expensed to the department because of an administrative error and he undertook to pay back the department in full.

In September 2007, the Public Protector announced that it would investigate the flower purchase and other allegations of improper conduct against Gigaba, especially an allegation that he had used his ministry office to establish the private Malusi Gigaba Institute of Leadership and to pay associated travel expenses. But the investigation was long delayed; it was not closed until February 2009, when the incumbent Public Protector, Lawrence Mushwana, reported that there was no evidence of wrongdoing. However, Mushwana noted that Gigaba did not "cooperate properly at all" with the investigation and recommended that the Speaker of the National Assembly should follow up on his non-compliance.

==== Polokwane conference ====
At the ANC's 52nd National Conference, held in Polokwane in December 2007, Gigaba was elected to a second term on the ANC National Executive Committee, ranked thirteenth of 80 members by number of votes received. Zuma unseated Mbeki as ANC president at the same conference, and observers described Gigaba as "seamlessly" switching alliances from Mbeki to Zuma in pursuit of his own political ambitions.

=== Public Enterprises: 2010–2014 ===
On 31 October 2010, in a major reshuffle, President Zuma promoted Gigaba to the cabinet, where he replaced Barbara Hogan as Minister of Public Enterprises. He was deputised by Ben Martins, and from 2012 by Gratitude Magwanishe.

From the outset of his tenure, he was noted for his overtly interventionist stance with respect to the governance of state-owned entities, which supporters linked to the ANC's policy of state-driven economic growth. However, in 2011, he was the first cabinet member, other than mining minister Susan Shabangu, openly to oppose the ANC Youth League's new pro-nationalisation mining policy. In August 2011, he told a meeting of the American Chamber of Commerce that the nationalisation debate "harms the good image and investments of the country". The league issued a strong rebuke of Gigaba in response, for which league secretary-general Sindiso Magaqa faced disciplinary sanctions. In what was viewed as a pro-Zuma gesture, Gigaba continued to criticise the incumbent leadership of the league under Julius Malema, later describing them as anarchists.

==== Alleged state capture ====
Gigaba's tenure in the public enterprises portfolio became highly contentious in the late 2010s due to revelations that massive corruption had occurred at state-owned enterprises during the same period, in what was later commonly referred to as state capture. The corruption was often alleged to have benefitted companies linked to the Gupta brothers, and Gigaba was a known associate of the Guptas and had visited their Saxonwold compound on several occasions. The opposition Economic Freedom Fighters (EFF) and other critics described Gigaba as having been an "architect of state capture", "the engine of state capture", and "a Gupta stooge". Betrayal of the Promise, a seminal State Capacity Research Project paper on state capture, said that Gigaba had inaugurated the "systematic reconfiguring" of state-owned enterprises such that their governance structures "became broadly representative of 'Gupta-Zuma' interests".

In particular, Gigaba was accused of undermining the governance of state-owned enterprises by appointing Gupta associates to board or executive positions, where they oversaw spectacular procurement irregularities, and by directly pressuring incumbents to channel procurement funds to Gupta-linked companies. Frequently mentioned in the first regard was Gigaba's role in appointing Dudu Myeni as South African Airways (SAA) chairperson, Brian Molefe and Siyabonga Gama as Transnet chief executives, Rafique Bagus as Alexcor chairperson, and Iqbal Sharma, Salim Essa's business partner, as a Transnet director. He also spearheaded a controversial overhaul of Eskom's board, which the Portfolio Committee on Public Enterprises later questioned. Commenting on such appointments, Gigaba said in 2017 that, "If I'd known then some of the things I know now, I would have done some things differently". In the second regard, Denel chief executive Riaz Salojee testified that Gigaba had introduced executives to the Gupta family and had personally pressured him to grant Denel contracts to Gupta-linked companies. Cheryl Carolus, Myeni's predecessor as SAA chairperson, gave similar testimony.

Gigaba was also accused of directly interfering in the operations of state-owned enterprises. For example, the Zondo Commission found that Gigaba had directly helped engineer public contracts with the Guptas' TNA Media, the parent company of the New Age and ANN7. A 2018 investigation by the National Treasury found that Gigaba had also interfered in two notoriously irregular locomotive supply contracts at Transnet, including by advising Transnet to continue with the procurement process without Treasury approval and in disregard of Treasury procurement rules. At Eskom, he controversially vetoed the board's recommendation to contract with Westinghouse for Koeberg Nuclear Power Station's steam generators.

Gigaba denied that he had been involved in tender corruption at the state-owned enterprises. When he appeared before the Zondo Commission in June 2021, he said of the evidence against him that, "Nothing that has been presented here places me anywhere near the money… to the extent that [corruption] happened during my tenure, it would be coincidental." However, his critics suggest that he received kickbacks from the Gupta family for pursuing their interests at the state-owned enterprises. At the Zondo Commission, Gigaba's driver and estranged wife both testified that they suspected that Gigaba took cash from the Guptas. Finding these allegations credible, the Zondo Commission ultimately recommended that Gigaba should face criminal investigation to determine whether he had received corrupt payments.

==== Mangaung conference ====
In the run-up to the ANC's 53rd National Conference, Gigaba publicly supported Zuma's bid to be re-elected as ANC president. In early 2012, he also chided those in the party – including his old friend Mbalula – who had begun to campaign for other leadership positions. However, by that time, Gigaba was rumoured to be preparing his own campaign for election as a Zuma-aligned secretary-general or deputy secretary-general, and his campaign reached full force by the spring. He was nominated for senior positions by some local party branches, but he did not ultimately appear on the ballot paper. Instead, when the conference was held in Mangaung in December 2012, he was re-elected as an ordinary member of the National Executive Committee; by number of votes received, he was ranked second of the 80 elected candidates, beaten only by Nkosazana Dlamini-Zuma.

In the aftermath of the conference, Gigaba was elected to the party's influential 20-member National Working Committee. The National Executive Committee also appointed him to replace Ngoako Ramatlhodi as the party's head of elections. In that capacity, he ran the party's national campaign in the 2014 general election as chairperson of a small committee that also included Thoko Didiza, as his deputy chairperson, and Amos Masondo as administrative lead.

==== Offshore bank account ====
In 2014 the Mail & Guardian reported that the State Security Agency had uncovered and investigated a bank account opened in Gigaba's name in Dubai. Sources told the newspaper that Gigaba had told the investigators that the account was opened by one of his officials without his knowledge. In subsequent years he repeatedly denied having any account in Dubai, telling Parliament that he had only a single FNB account.

=== Return to Home Affairs: 2014–2017 ===
When the general election was held in May 2014, Gigaba was ranked third on the ANC's national party list. Zuma re-appointed him to his second-term cabinet but moved him to his former home affairs portfolio, now as Minister of Home Affairs. PASSOP released a statement welcoming the appointment on the basis of Gigaba's record as deputy minister.

==== Immigration regulations ====
Shortly after he entered the ministry, Gigaba implemented new immigration regulations that included, inter alia, the new rule that minor children would not be allowed to travel without their unabridged birth certificate and written proof of parental consent. The new rule aimed to prevent child trafficking but, after it went into effect in June 2015, several organisations, including the South African Reserve Bank and Tourism Business Council of South Africa, raised strident concerns about its effects on tourism. Gigaba initially dismissed the tourism sector's concerns. However, in September 2018 – during his second stint as home affairs minister – he relaxed the requirements. Defending Gigaba, Peter Bruce pointed out that the regulations had been formulated under Gigaba's predecessor, Naledi Pandor, and he had only had "the great misfortune" of entering the ministry shortly after they were scheduled to come into effect.

In 2016, Gigaba was commended by LGTBQ activists for reversing a departmental decision that would have allowed Steven Anderson entry into South Africa to proselytize on behalf of his Faithful Word Baptist Church. After receiving a petition signed by around 60,000 people, Gigaba announced that Anderson and his colleagues would not be granted South African visas short of "public repentance" for their bigotry against gay people, black people, and women.

A long-time critic of South Africa's traditional ID books, Gigaba also continued the government's roll out of smart ID cards, introducing the pilot programme that allowed major banks to issue ID cards directly to residents.

==== Gupta family naturalisation ====
In 2015, Gigaba approved Ajay Gupta's application for South African citizenship, granting early naturalisation to Gupta and his family and reversing an adverse decision that his department had made on the application several months earlier. Gigaba confirmed that he had made the approval in 2017, after related documents were leaked and circulated on social media, but he said that his decision to waive the residency requirement for naturalisation had been lawful under the South African Citizenship Act.

The Portfolio Committee on Home Affairs subsequently launched an investigation into the decision, but it did not conclude until after Gigaba left government. The inquiry brought renewed attention to Gigaba's personal relationship with the Gupta brothers. In his own testimony before the committee in October 2018, Gigaba said that the family were no more than "acquaintances" and that he had attended their Diwali parties for "social cohesion reasons" alone. In March 2019, the committee concluded its investigation with a finding that the naturalisation process had involved "significant irregularities" and that Gigaba's decision had ultimately been "incorrect," in part because the Gupta family's applications had contained false and fraudulent information and partly because Ajay Gupta was an Indian citizen and ineligible for dual citizenship. The committee resolved to refer its findings to the Zondo Commission on the basis that the incident was potentially linked to state capture.

Opposition politicians also referred the findings to the acting Public Protector, Kholeka Gcaleka, for further investigation of Gigaba's culpability. Gcaleka concluded that Gigaba had reasonably exercised his ministerial discretion and instead blamed department officials for failing to verify the application information that Gigaba had relied on. However, she found that Gigaba had violated the executive members ethics code by failing to report the naturalisation to Parliament as required by the Citizenship Act.

In a related matter, the Organisation Undoing Tax Abuse alleged that Gigaba, with the assistance of home affairs officials, had intervened in visa processes on behalf of Tony Gupta. The organisation launched a private prosecution against Gigaba and three others in September 2017.

==== Fireblade Aviation ====
In November 2016, the Oppenheimer family sued Gigaba in his ministerial capacity, alleging that he had reneged on an agreement regarding the VIP airport terminal operated by the Oppenheimer aviation company, Fireblade Aviation, in Johannesburg. The Oppenheimers claimed that Gigaba had promised to declare the terminal an international port of entry, enabling international transit through it, but that he had subsequently obstructed the project. They suggested that his decision-making was swayed by the Gupta family, who allegedly hoped to redirect the premises – Denel-owned premises leased by Fireblade – for their own profit. In response Gigaba categorically denied that he had approved Fireblade's application, saying that he disapproved of the VIP terminal project not because of Gupta or Denel influence but because he viewed it as "exclusionary" and even unconstitutional.

The ensuing litigation outlasted Gigaba's tenure in the home affairs portfolio. On 27 October 2017, the North Gauteng High Court handed down a ruling that was scathing of Gigaba's conduct, finding that he had deliberately lied under oath when he denied that an agreement existed with Fireblade. Judge Neil Tuchten wrote of Gigaba that he had "committed a breach of the Constitution so serious that I could characterize it as a violation". Gigaba sought unsuccessfully to appeal the court's judgment: the Supreme Court of Appeal dismissed his application for leave to appeal on 28 March 2018, finding the appeal lacked a reasonable prospect of success, and the Constitutional Court dismissed a concurrent application on the same grounds on 1 November 2018.

After the High Court's judgment, opposition leader John Steenhuisen laid a complaint against Gigaba with the Public Protector, Busisiwe Mkhwebane. In October 2018 she released the report of her investigation, which concluded that Gigaba had violated the Constitution, the executive members ethics code, and the parliamentary ethics code when he lied under oath. Mkhwebane instructed the Speaker of the National Assembly, Baleka Mbete, to refer the matter to Parliament's ethics committee, while President Ramaphosa was directed to take disciplinary action against Gigaba directly.

=== Finance: 2017–2018 ===
In the early hours of 31 March 2017, President Zuma announced a major cabinet reshuffle in which Gigaba replaced Pravin Gordhan as Minister of Finance. The decision sparked unease: while Gordhan was viewed as highly credible, Gigaba's appointment was regarded by critics as "shockingly inappropriate". Senior ANC leaders severely criticised the reshuffle, and it partly precipitated the so-called #ZumaMustFall protests of early April. The value of the rand fell precipitously, and both S&P and Fitch downgraded South Africa's sovereign credit rating to junk status. The youngest finance minister in South African history, Gigaba said that his immediate priority would be "to stabilise the economy‚ to calm the markets and to continue engaging with different stakeholders".

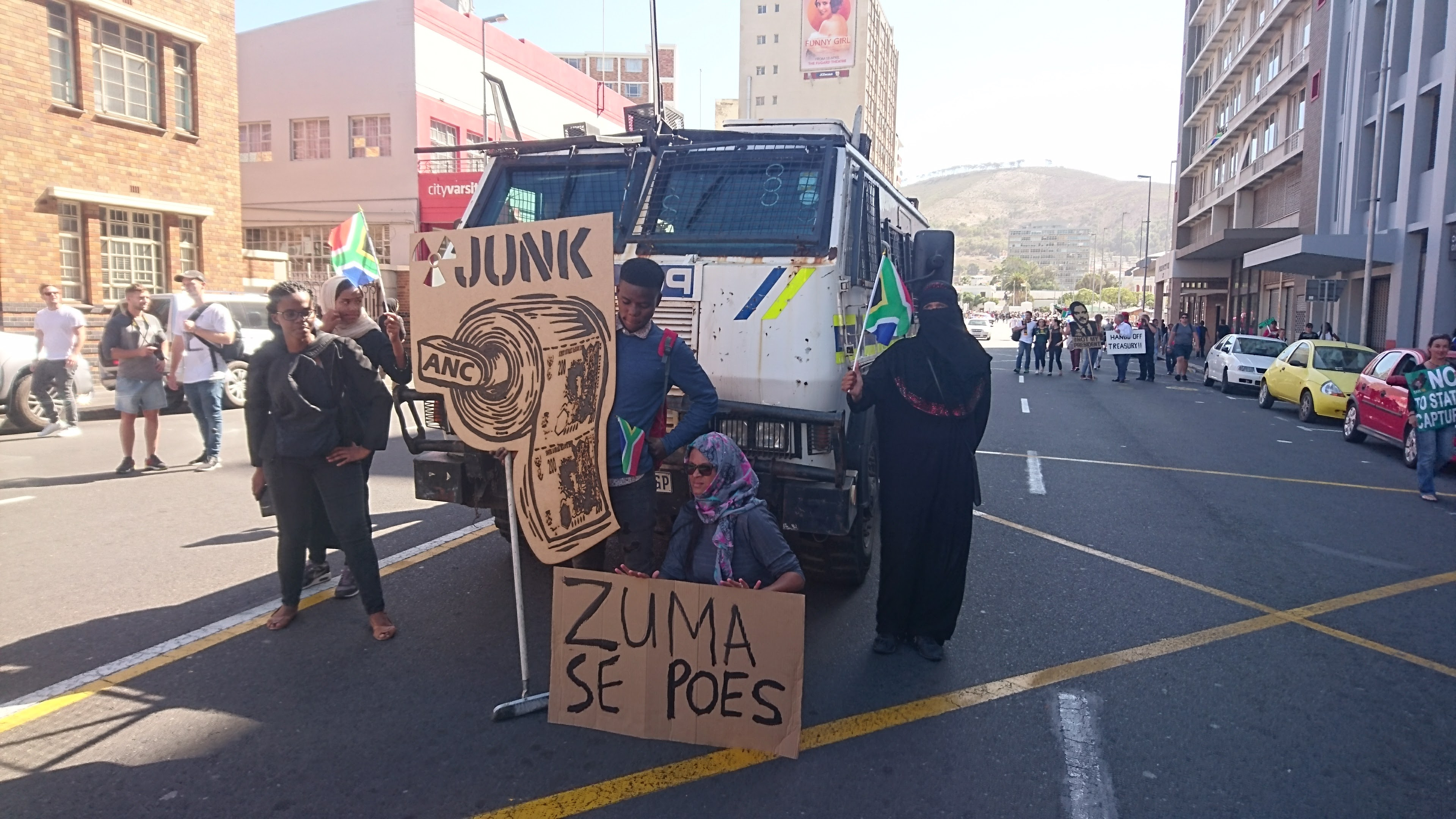
Insulting placards at the Zuma Must Fall protest in Cape Town, alluding to the downgrade of South Africa's sovereign credit rating, 7 April 2017

During his first media briefing, Gigaba said that his ministry would seek to promote Zuma's agenda of radical economic transformation but to do so "within the fiscal policy ceilings we have set". Likewise, he said that he supported Zuma's nuclear procurement programme but only "at a pace and scale we can afford". In subsequent months, as a national recession worsened, Gigaba published a fourteen-point "inclusive growth action plan" that received a lukewarm reception. He also floated a proposal to use Public Investment Corporation assets to fund state projects, including a prospective multi-billion-rand bailout of SAA, to the condemnation of the Federation of Unions of South Africa. His mini-budget in October 2017 was poorly received by the markets and by economists, and responses to his February 2018 budget speech were mixed.

Meanwhile, in December 2017, Gigaba attended the ANC's 54th National Conference at Nasrec, where he was re-elected to the party's National Executive Committee; by number of votes received, he was ranked fifth of the 80 ordinary members elected to the committee. However, he was not re-elected to the National Working Committee. In the run-up to the conference, Gigaba had again been mentioned as a potential candidate for a top leadership position, potentially for the deputy president slot on Nkosazana Dlamini-Zuma's losing slate.

=== Return to Home Affairs: 2018 ===
In the aftermath of the Nasrec conference, in February 2018, the ANC compelled Zuma to resign from the national presidency, and Cyril Ramaphosa was elected to replace him. Announcing his new cabinet on 26 February, Ramaphosa demoted Gigaba and returned him to his former position as Minister of Home Affairs, where he succeeded Ayanda Dlodlo. Nhlanhla Nene was named as the new Minister of Finance.

Gigaba retained his new position for less than a year, as he faced mounting public and political pressure over the Fireblade revelations. Calls for Gigaba's resignation intensified in the first half of November due to the release of the Public Protector's Fireblade report and the Constitutional Court's denial of leave to appeal, compounded by a sex tape scandal. On 3 November 2018, Gigaba told City Press that he would not resign because to do so would be to surrender "to a devious plot". However, on 13 November, he resigned from the cabinet, saying in a statement that his decision was motivated by the need to protect the "integrity and public standing" of the government and ANC. He also resigned from the National Assembly on 15 November. The Sunday Times reported that President Ramaphosa had personally called Gigaba to convey the ANC leadership's instruction that he should resign. Transport minister Blade Nzimande was appointed to take over Gigaba's home affairs portfolio in an acting capacity.

== Later career ==
=== Hiatus: 2018–2024 ===
Gigaba stood as an ANC candidate in the next general election in May 2019, but, though he won a seat, he announced after the election that he would not be sworn in. He subsequently retreated from frontline politics, leading commentators to lament "the implosion of what could have been Malusi Gigaba's stellar political career". He took up employment at Luthuli House, the ANC's headquarters, where he was a member of the party's policy unit. However, in an interview on Radio 702 in July 2020, he said that his resignation had been the culmination of an "intensified campaign to single me out" and that he still believed himself to "have a future in the ANC and a long one".

==== Zondo Commission recommendations ====
After holding hearings between 2018 and 2021, the Zondo Commission published its second report, dedicated to corruption in the public enterprises portfolio, in February 2022. The report recommended that Gigaba should face criminal investigation for possible violations of the Prevention of Organised Crime Act and Prevention and Combating of Corrupt Activities Act – in particular for reinstating Siyabonga Gama as Transnet chief executive and for allegedly receiving cash payments from the Gupta family. An amended version of the report, published in October 2022, recapitulated specific examples of gratuities that Gigaba was credibly alleged to have received from the Guptas, including two luxury watches; a holiday to Dubai; and a series of payments to renovate his father's Mandeni home, to pay off his sister's debts, to pay for his wedding, and to pay his children's school fees. Gigaba responded with vitriol, Tweeting that commission chairperson Raymond Zondo had made his recommendations "in the hope this will kill me politically".

==== Nasrec II conference ====
In October 2022, Gigaba suggested publicly that he should be considered for election as ANC secretary-general when the party held its 55th National Conference at Nasrec in December that year. He did not ultimately stand for a top leadership position, but the 55th Conference re-elected him to the National Executive Committee; he received 1,856 votes across roughly 4,000 ballots, making him the seventh-most popular member of the 80-member committee.

=== Return to Parliament: 2024–present ===
Ahead of the May 2024 general election, the ANC's internal Integrity Commission, chaired by Frank Chikane, recommended that Gigaba and other party leaders should not be nominated to Parliament because of the Zondo Commission's adverse findings against them. However, the party included Gigaba on its list of national candidates, and he was elected to return to the National Assembly in the election. He was also elected as co-chairperson of Parliament's Joint Standing Committee on Defence, serving alongside Phiroane Phala of the National Council of Provinces.

== Personal life ==
Gigaba's first wife was Thabong Nxumalo, with whom he has a daughter. In 2010 they initiated acrimonious divorce proceedings. In August 2014, a month after his divorce was finalised, Gigaba remarried to businesswoman Nomachule "Norma" Mngoma in a ceremony at the Durban Botanic Gardens. He has two sons with Mngoma.

Gigaba and Mngoma initiated divorce proceedings in 2020. In July that year, Mngoma was arrested by the Hawks and charged with malicious property damage for vandalising a Mercedes-Benz G-Wagon that Gigaba was borrowing from a friend. She sued the state, with lawyer Dali Mpofu arguing on her behalf that she had been arrested as a "favour for her husband"; in February 2021, the North Gauteng High Court ruled that the arrest had been unlawful. In April and May 2021, the couple traded recriminations in their respective appearances before the Zondo Commission, leading the Sowetan to comment that they had turned the commission into "a divorce court". Among other things, Mngoma testified that Gigaba had regularly received cash and gifts from the Gupta brothers.

Among ministers, Gigaba was an early adopter of social media, and he has a substantial Twitter following. In February 2018, while Gigaba was finance minister, News24 photographed him playing Candy Crush on his iPad during a parliamentary meeting addressed by President Ramaphosa and Chief Whip Jackson Mthembu; the photo went viral on social media and Gigaba joked in his budget speech later that week that he would attend "Candy Crush rehab".

=== Sex scandals ===
In November 2015, a New York-based stylist named Buhle Mkhize published an open letter describing a year-long extramarital affair with Gigaba. After intermittently exchanging insults with Mkhize on social media, Gigaba's wife confirmed in January 2016 that he had cheated with Mkhize.

In October 2018, a video of Gigaba masturbating went viral on social media and trended on Pornhub's viewership charts. Gigaba apologized for the incident on Twitter, saying that he had been subject to phone hacking and attempted blackmail in 2017.

Political offices
Preceded by Naledi Pandor	Minister of Home Affairs; 2014–2017	Succeeded by Hlengiwe Mkhize
Preceded by Pravin Gordhan	Minister of Finance; 2017–2018	Succeeded by Nhlanhla Nene
Preceded by Ayanda Dlodlo	Minister of Home Affairs; 2018–2018	Succeeded by Siyabonga Cwele
