= Peter Bruce (journalist) =

South African journalist (born 1952)

- Born: November 1952 (age 73); Umtata, Cape Province; South Africa
- Education: Rhodes University
- Employer: Times Media Group (1997–2017)
- Spouse: Robyn Chalmers
- Father: Harold Clyde Bruce
- Relatives: Wendy Woods (sister); Donald Woods (brother-in-law)

Peter Bruce (born November 1952) is a South African business journalist and political commentator. He is best known as the former editor of the Business Day between January 2001 and August 2012. He left that position to become publisher and editor-in-chief of the Business Day and its sister paper, the Financial Mail. He retired as an editor in 2017 but continues to write popular newspaper columns about South African politics and business.

== Early life and career ==
Bruce was born in November 1952 in Umtata in the Eastern Cape. His father, Harold Clyde Bruce, was an Umtata-born carpenter who served in the British Royal Navy; he also wrote Once in My Beloved Transkei, a memoir about his upbringing in the Transkei. Bruce's elder sister was Wendy Woods, an activist who married the journalist Donald Woods in 1962.

After attending Umtata High School, Bruce studied journalism at Rhodes University in Grahamstown, where he was taught by Peter Temple. His first newspaper job was at The Mercury in Durban. He worked briefly for the Rand Daily Mail before joining the English Financial Times, where he was a journalist for the next 18 years; he left South Africa in 1978 while evading conscription into the apartheid-era South African Defence Force.

At the Financial Times, he was a staff correspondent in Germany (in Bonn), Spain (in Madrid), and Japan, and he later settled in London, England as the editor of the newspaper's European news desk and then of its United Kingdom news desk. In 1996 he returned to South Africa as editor of The Star's new weekday business supplement, Business Report.

== Editorial career at the Times Media Group ==
=== Editor of Financial Mail: 1997–2001 ===
In November 1996, Nigel Bruce (no relation) resigned as editor of the Financial Mail, one of the two major business titles of the Times Media Group (TMG); Bruce, then less than a year into his tenure at Business Report, was viewed as a frontrunner to succeed him. He was appointed to the job shortly afterwards, amid a deal which saw Pearson, the British publisher of the Financial Times, acquire a 50-per-cent stake in TMG's business titles. The Mail & Guardian later said that over the next 15 years Pearson was "very supportive" of Bruce's career in those titles.

Beginning work at the Financial Mail in January 1997, Bruce was succeeded at the Business Report by his protégé James Lamont. In May 1999 Bruce caused significant controversy by publishing an editorial in which he endorsed the opposition United Democratic Movement ahead of the June 1999 general election. TMG's chairperson, former politician Cyril Ramaphosa, criticised the endorsement at length in his own op-ed, also printed in the Financial Mail, and the exchange led to a public debate about editorial independence. In the aftermath, the Mail & Guardian's Phillip van Niekerk decided to reverse his own paper's stance on editorial endorsements to come out in favour of the African National Congress.

=== Editor of Business Day: 2001–2012 ===
In January 2001, Bruce left the Financial Mail to succeed Jim Jones as the editor of the Financial Mail's sister paper, TMG's Business Day; Caroline Southey succeeded him at the Financial Mail. He edited the Business Day for the next 11 years.

As an editor Bruce identified as an opponent of a ubiquitous right of reply, arguing that many replies were "a total waste of precious editorial space". Sarah Wild, who was a science writer at the paper, said that Bruce was known for his "'so what?' test", according to which stories weren't published unless their authors could answer Bruce when asked "So what?".

In December 2004, the Business Day published the first edition of its new monthly luxury lifestyle supplement, Wanted, which was inspired by the Financial Times's How To Spend It. Between 2006 and 2009, it was published alongside a Saturday supplement called The Weekender, which ultimately failed to meet its circulation targets. Bruce also pursued the development of the newspaper's website, which was managed in-house, with a dedicated online editor, from 2007 onwards.

=== Editor-in-chief and editor-at-large: 2012–2017 ===
On 31 August 2012, Bruce announced that he would resign as editor of Business Day to become publisher of BDFM Publishers, the TMG–Pearson joint venture that published Business Day, the Financial Mail, and Summit TV. He replaced Mzi Malunga, who had resigned as BDFM's managing director, and he said that he would have responsibility both for operations and for broad editorial strategy. The Mail & Guardian later described Malunga's departure as the prelude to a "bloody purge" at TMG, which took place amid a restructuring of the company's media holdings; over the next year TMG also acquired Pearson's shareholding in BDFM, becoming sole shareholder.

In late February 2013, further reorganisation was announced: in addition to his position as BDFM publisher, Bruce returned to his former position as Business Day editor, and he was named as editor-in-chief of both BDFM titles. However, he returned to the Business Day editorship for only a year: on 1 May 2014, he ceded the job to Songezo Zibi in order to focus on his responsibilities as editor-in-chief and especially on the growth of Summit TV (newly renamed Business Day TV).

Meanwhile, as publisher and editor-in-chief, Bruce presided over the Business Day's transition from a broadsheet format to a tabloid format, over a significant round of retrenchments, and over a change in advertising strategy necessitated by looser JSE rules for the mandatory publication of financial notices. He also spearheaded organisational reforms to integrate the newsrooms of the Financial Mail and Business Day, particularly with an eye to creating digital content for the BDlive platform. Barney Mthombothi reportedly resigned as Financial Mail editor due to dissatisfaction with Bruce's plans for the newsroom merger.

After businessman Iqbal Survé's controversial acquisition of the Independent Group, Survé repeatedly accused Bruce of spearheading a conspiracy against him and the Independent Group's newspapers, suggesting that Bruce was publishing investigative reporting on the acquisition as a means of character assassination. The Mail & Guardian said that this accusation was met with "mirth".

Bruce was later named as editor-at-large at TMG (renamed Tiso Blackstar Group). He retired after his 65th birthday in November 2017, though he continued to write his columns in the Business Day, Financial Mail, and Sunday Times.

== Columns and podcast ==
Bruce is well known for his columns, long published in TMG newspapers. In 2017 Gareth van Onselen said of the columns that Bruce was "a maverick and a speculator, and an invaluable one at that", while noting that any individual column "is either right on the money, or, occasionally, right off it". In a similar vein, Jeremy Gordin expressed fondness for Bruce but said that he "can write the most awful codswallop"; he nicknamed Bruce's Business Day column, The Thick End of the Wedge, as The Thin End of the Old Duffer's Intellect.

In November 2020, Bruce published an interview with politician Helen Zille as the first episode of his new podcast series, Podcasts from the Edge. The podcast, a current affairs interview series, is produced by the TimesLIVE podcast company.

== White monopoly capital campaign ==
In June 2017, a dossier on Bruce was published on a blog called WMCleaks, WMC being an abbreviation of so-called white monopoly capital. The document contained various surveillance photographs of Bruce going about his daily business, alongside an unproven allegation that Bruce was having an extramarital affair. On 29 June, in a Business Day column, Bruce linked the dossier to ongoing Twitter harassment and suggested that both were an organised response to his critical reporting about the Gupta brothers, President Jacob Zuma's notorious allies. This conclusion received support in an investigation by the Daily Maverick's Jean Le Roux and Marianne Thamm, who found links between Gupta employees and the dossier, as well as the website on which the dossier was hosted.

Later on 29 June 2017, about 20 members of Black First Land First (BFLF) staged an aggressive picket outside Bruce's home in Parkview, Johannesburg; protestors vandalised his garage door with the slogan "land or death" and held placards that accused him of being a propagandist to white monopoly capital. Business Day editor Tim Cohen was physically accosted by protestors when he visited the house. The protest was condemned as an intimidation campaign and attack on media freedom by the South African Human Rights Commission, the African National Congress, and the South African National Editors' Forum (SANEF). Later the same week, Bruce was among the journalists who joined a lawsuit lodged by SANEF against BFLF and its leader, Andile Mngxitama; the suit succeeded in obtaining an urgent interdict against further harassment of journalists and editors.

Over the next few months, amaBhungane and other media outfits reported on emails leaked in the so-called GuptaLeaks, which revealed a fake news campaign coordinated by the Gupta family and the public relations firm Bell Pottinger, with the participation of BFLF and others. Among other things, the emails showed that Bell Pottinger and the Guptas had worked together to devise a Twitterbot campaign in response to Bruce's critical columns about the Guptas. It also transpired that the surveillance of Bruce had included illegal access to his private phone records. In 2018, Bruce joined with Huffington Post editor Ferial Haffajee and News24 editor Adriaan Basson to sue Bell Pottinger's insurer for defamation and breach of privacy resulting from the fake news campaign.

== Awards ==
In 2014 Bruce received the Lifetime Achievement Award at the 2014 Sanlam Awards for Excellence in Financial Journalism. His alma mater, Rhodes University, awarded him its JSM50 Distinguished Alumni Award in 2022.

== Personal life ==
He lives in Stanford, Western Cape, where he opened a restaurant with his wife Robyn Chalmers.
