= Gupta family =

Indian South African business family

Gupta
- Place of origin: Saharanpur, Uttar Pradesh, India
- Members: Ajay Gupta (b. 5 February 1966); Atul Gupta (b. 14 June 1968); Rajesh ("Tony") Gupta; Varun Gupta
- Estates: Sahara Estate, Saxonwold, Johannesburg

The Gupta family is a wealthy and influential business family from India, with close ties to former South African President Jacob Zuma and his administration. The family's most notable members are the brothers Ajay, Atul, and Rajesh "Tony" Gupta—as well as Atul's nephews Varun, and US-based Ashish and Amol.

The family's business empire in South Africa spanned a variety of industries, including mining, media, and technology. The family name has become synonymous with corruption in South Africa as well as undue influence, and state capture.

They have been sanctioned by multiple countries for their activities, with investigations ongoing in both South Africa and the United States. Many prominent South Africans and politicians have been linked to the family's corrupt activities, including members of the ruling African National Congress (ANC) party. The Gupta family has since fled South Africa and has been spotted in Switzerland, the United Arab Emirates (UAE), and Vanuatu. In 2023, the UAE refused to extradite Atul and Rajesh Gupta to South Africa where they face charges of fraud and money laundering.

== History ==
The family migrated from the Indian state of Uttar Pradesh to South Africa in 1993 to establish Sahara Computers. The family was based at the Sahara Estate in Saxonwold, Johannesburg, a compound comprising at least four mansions, until 2016 when they left South Africa for Dubai, United Arab Emirates.

In 2016, Atul Gupta became the seventh-wealthiest person in South Africa, with an estimated net worth of R10.7 billion (US$773.47 million), based on JSE-listed holdings.

The family has been the focus of extensive international scrutiny and caused much political controversy as a result of their close ties to Jacob Zuma before and during his presidency. Their strong connections to Zuma, both personal and through their company Oakbay Investments, have led to widespread speculations of corruption and undue influence. These ties have also led to accusations of state capture: it is alleged that the government has undertaken activities and decisions, decided some high-level appointments, and directed state enterprises, for the Gupta family's direct or indirect benefit, or in agreement with the family.

In 2015, the Guptas' influence on the presidency was described by anti-corruption campaigner and former trades unionist Zwelinzima Vavi as being a "shadow government." Multiple Members of Parliament and ministers have stated that they were offered government positions by, or on behalf of, the Gupta family, in return for beneficial commercial decisions once appointed.

In 2017, it was discovered that British PR company Bell Pottinger, acting on behalf of Gupta-owned Oakbay Investments, had deliberately manipulated and inflamed racial tensions, stirred up racial hatred, and made accusations of "white monopoly capital," using a large number of fake Twitter and other accounts online, as part of a campaign to portray Oakbay and those connected to it as victims, apparently intended to deflect corruption claims. Bell Pottinger subsequently collapsed in the wake of the scandal.

== Interests ==
The family has operated a number of companies in different industries, including information and communications technology, mining, engineering, media, real estate, and leisure.

Their first venture into South Africa was in the early 1990s, with the establishment of Sahara Computers and Sahara Systems PLC, the former being a hardware distribution company.

In mining, the family's investments have included:

- Oakbay Resources and Energy — a mining and processing company that supplies such products as gold, uranium, platinum, coal, and diamonds, as well as conducting trackless/mechanised mining, track bound mining, breast mining, down-dip mining, and open-pit gold operation. It began trading on the JSE on 28 November 2014.
  - The Shiva Uranium Mine (acquired in 2010 as Uranium One) — a uranium and gold mining and processing company in Hartbeesfontein, North West.
- Tegeta Exploration and Resources — coal mining and exploration company
- Westdawn Investments Ltd (tradename: JIC Mining Services) — a contract mining company
- Black Edge Exploration
- VR Laser Services — a steel-plate processing centre for the mining, rail, transport, and defence industries.

They held substantial media interests in South Africa through:

- TNA Media — a company that published the now-defunct The New Age, a national daily newspaper.
- Infinity Media — aired the now-defunct (ANN7 or African News Network) — a 24-hour news channel.

The family invested in real estate and hospitality through Islandsite Investments 180, which held properties in Johannesburg, Cape Town, Durban, Rustenburg, and Welgevonden, among others.

Other interests include Confident Concepts. On 8 September 2016, Oakbay Investments released their annual audited results: for the financial year ending on 29 February 2016, the company's group revenue totaled R2.62 billion.

=== Sales of business units (August 2017) ===
On 21 August 2017, Oakbay announced the sale of both media units, Infinity Media (ANN7 TV news) and TNA Media (The New Age newspaper), to a firm named Lodidox, owned by Mzwanele Manyi. Per the company's statement, Oakbay would sell its shareholding in Infinity Media for R300-million and its two-thirds stake in TNA Media for R150 million. The sale was vendor-financed, which entailed the lending of R450 million worth of shares to Manyi-owned Lodidox by Gupta-owned Oakbay so the sale could occur. The Economic Freedom Fighters criticised the deal, stating that it simply disguised continued Gupta ownership.

On 23 August 2017, Oakbay announced the sale of Tegeta Exploration and Resources to Swiss-based Charles King SA for R2.97-billion. Oakbay stipulated that the purchaser safeguard mine employment and maintain a minimum of 30% of shares allocated to a BEE partner.

== Relationship with Jacob Zuma ==
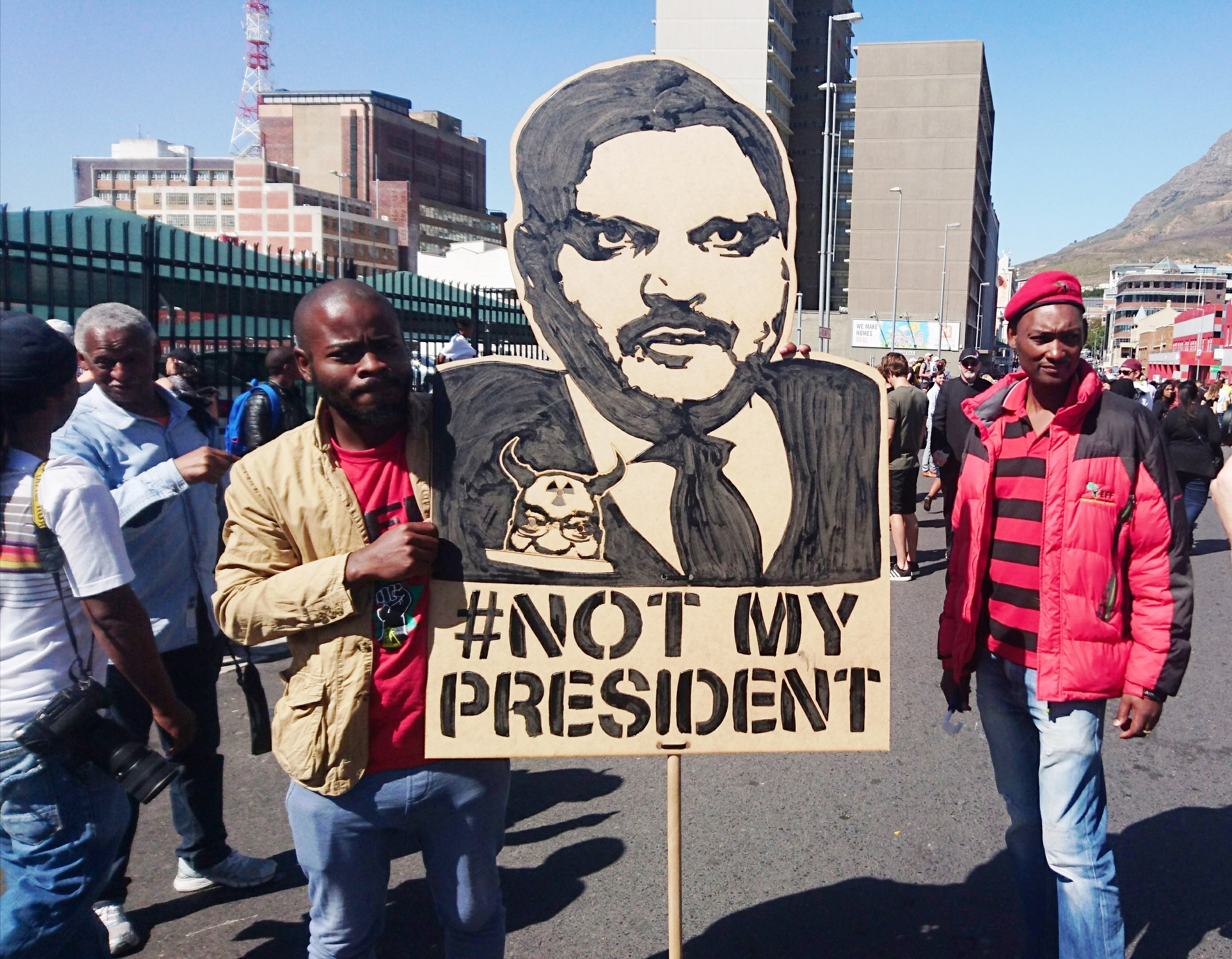
A protest placard depicting Atul Gupta at a Zuma Must Fall protest in Cape Town. The slogan "#Not My President" on the placard explicitly links Atul Gupta with President Zuma.

The Gupta family has been the focus of extensive international scrutiny and caused much political controversy as result of their close ties to former President Jacob Zuma, before and during his presidency. Zuma's close relationship with the family is also a source of tension within his own party, the ANC. Both Zuma and the Guptas, however, deny that the relationship has granted any undue influence to the family.

The Guptas and then-Deputy President Zuma first met at a function hosted by the Guptas at their Sahara Estate in 2003. Since then, the family have been involved in a number of events involving Zuma and his family. The family is also known to have been a supporter of Zuma during his power struggle for leadership of the ANC with then-president Thabo Mbeki in 2005.

The family is known to have employed one of Zuma's wives, Bongi Ngema-Zuma. Moreover, one of Zuma's sons, Duduzane Zuma, was a director in a number of Gupta-owned firms, but has since resigned from all positions held at Gupta-owned businesses; and one of his daughters, Duduzile Zuma, was made a director of the Gupta-owned Sahara computers in 2008, and has also since resigned from that position.

The Guptas' influence on the presidency has been described by Zwelinzima Vavi, the former General Secretary of the Congress of South African Trade Unions, as a "shadow government." Donwald Pressly, of the South African business publication Biznews, has stated that comments made by then-Deputy President Cyril Ramaphosa about the state capture of public enterprises by people with political connections was referring to the close relationship between Zuma and the Guptas. One of South Africa's opposition parties, the Economic Freedom Fighters (EFF), stated that the Guptas "have de facto colonised South Africa, with Zuma being the chief colonial administrator." The Guptas have denied this allegation, saying that they have never taken any benefit from the relationship with Zuma.

Prior to its national executive committee over the weekend of 18–20 March 2016, spokesperson Zizi Kodwa said that the ANC was concerned about state capture. As result, in March 2016, the ANC launched an investigation into state capture and the Gupta family. In May 2016, ANC Secretary-General Gwede Mantashe said that it would be a "fruitless" exercise for the party to continue to investigate allegations of state capture against the Gupta family as they had only received one written submission on the matter. A spokesman for the ‘Hawks’, serious-crime investigative unit set up by the Zuma administration, stated that reports of corruption charges being filed against three ministers and the Gupta family were "baseless."

As part of the company's annual results announcement in September 2016, Oakbay Investments stated that government contracts accounted for 9% of the company's sales. Oakbay also stated that its largest mining company, JIC Mining Services, has never had a government contract, while Sahara, the second biggest contributor, has had no government contacts following a deliberate decision taken by the board in 2008.

=== Zupta ===
The term Zupta refers to the close relationship between the Gupta family and Jacob Zuma, particularly used by detractors of both Zuma and the family.

The portmanteau—a combination of "Z" from "Zuma" and the "upta" from "Gupta"—was first coined by the Economic Freedom Fighters at the 2016 South African presidential State of the Nation Address when they disrupted the event by repeatedly chanting "Zupta must fall" to express their dissatisfaction with this relationship.

=== "Guptagate" wedding controversy ===
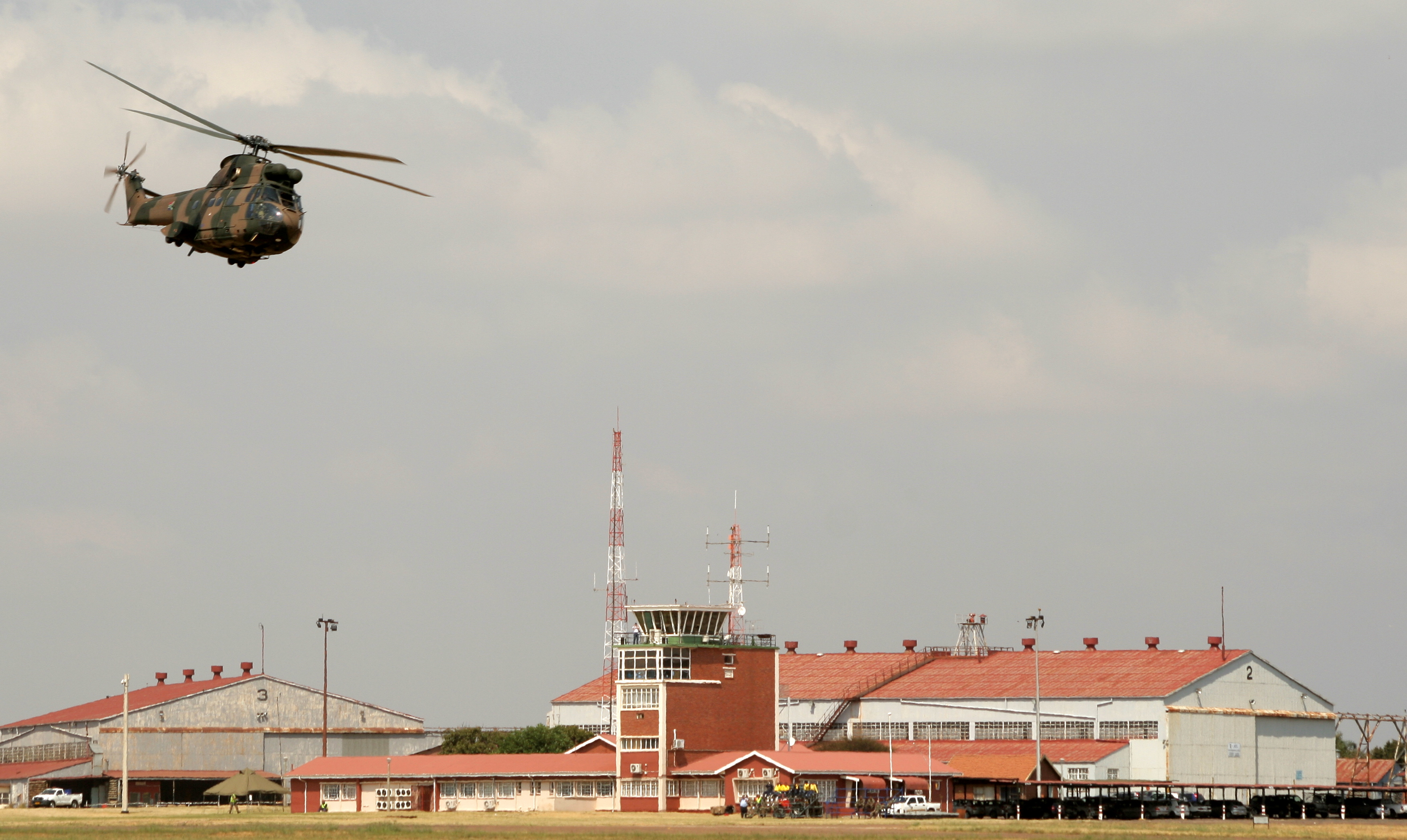
Waterkloof Air Force Base where the Jet Airways plane landed in April 2013, sparking the Guptagate controversy

On 30 April 2013, an Airbus A330-200 chartered aircraft run by Jet Airways carrying 217 guests from India was cleared to land at the South African Air Force base at Waterkloof for the wedding ceremony of Vega Gupta to Aakash Jahajgarhia at Sun City, North West. This event caused a significant controversy that led to the African National Congress (ANC) and other political parties, as well as the South African National Defence Union, to denounce this irregular use of the air force base. The ANC issued a statement calling for "those responsible for giving the family permission to come into the country without going through the normal channels be 'brought to book'."

In the aftermath of the event, India's High Commissioner Virendra Gupta (no relation) said publicly that the Indian High Commission had been given permission to land the plane at Waterkloof Air Force Base. He explained that the Commission communicated through its defence adviser with the chief of defence for foreign relations in the SA National Defence Force (SANDF).

The landing was cleared by Bruce Koloane, then-chief of state protocol at the Department of International Relations, who insisted that the flight was a "sensitive" official visit. Koloane was demoted after an investigation concluded that he used Zuma's name to illegally authorise the landing. President Zuma was scheduled to attend the wedding but cancelled after the incident became public. The family apologised for the incident, stating that they had applied for special permission to land as a number of the guests were Indian government ministers and that it was promoting tourism to South Africa. The incident prompted a significant outcry, so much so that it was dubbed "Guptagate" by the South African media.

In 2017, it was revealed that the wedding was paid for by funds, laundered through Dubai, and granted to a Gupta-linked company by the Free State Province government, purportedly as part of the Vrede Dairy Project. In January 2018, the Asset Forfeiture Unit of the National Prosecuting Authority seized R220 million that Free State Department of Agriculture under Mosebenzi Zwane had paid to the Gupta family as part of this project, calling it a "scheme designed to defraud and steal monies from the department". The Hawks unit of South Africa's Directorate for Priority Crime Investigation (DPCI) raided the offices of Ace Magashule, the Premier of the Free State, in connection with the project.

=== Influence over Cabinet appointments ===
In 2016, a series of allegations of the Guptas' influence over appointments to the South African Cabinet came to the fore. Former ANC MP Vytjie Mentor claimed that in 2010 the Guptas had offered her the position of Minister of Public Enterprises, provided that she arranged for South African Airways to drop their India route, allowing Gupta-linked Jet Airways to take the route. She said she declined the offer, which occurred at the Guptas' Saxonwold residence, while President Zuma was in another room. This came a few days before a cabinet reshuffle in which minister Barbara Hogan was dismissed by Zuma. The Gupta family denied that the meeting took place and denied offering Vytijie a ministerial position. President Zuma claimed that he had no recollection of Vytjie Mentor.

Deputy Finance Minister Mcebisi Jonas confirmed media reports that he had been offered the ministerial position by the Guptas shortly before the disastrous dismissal of Finance Minister Nhlanhla Nene in December 2015, but had rejected the offer out of hand as "it makes a mockery of our hard-earned democracy‚ the trust of our people and no one apart from the President of the Republic appoints ministers." The Gupta family denied offering Jonas the job of Finance Minister.

The Sunday Times has reported that the Minister of Mineral Resources, Mosebenzi Zwane, and then Minister of Co-operative Governance and Traditional Affairs, David van Rooyen (who was controversially appointed by President Zuma as Minister of Finance in December 2015) met with members of the Gupta family in Dubai. Van Rooyen allegedly met with them only a few days after his unsuccessful appointment to be Minister of Finance on 20 December 2015. Minister Zwane assisted in the sale of a large coal mine to a Gupta owned company.

Former bodyguards of the Gupta family have stated that they often saw important government officials, such as Hlaudi Motsoeneng the COO of the state broadcaster, the SABC, and large amounts of money in cash moving out of the Gupta's Saxonwold estate. The bodyguards also stated that Ajay Gupta would visit President Zuma up to three times a week until 2015 at the presidential guest house in Pretoria. A spokesperson for president Zuma denies that the visits ever happened.

Ranjeni Munusamy of the Daily Maverick stated the "Gupta family has effectively usurped the function of the ANC deployment committee," thereby undermining the party's ability to independently and legitimately select senior ministers and executives in government and state owned companies. In 2011, Atul Gupta was interviewed by journalist Mandy de Waal (now known as Charles Lee Mathews) for the Daily Maverick, where she examined his business ventures and political connections, particularly his family's ties to Zuma. Atul defended their relationship with Zuma and said the press often mixed “small insignificant truisms” with “incorrect innuendoes” when analyzing the matter.

Following a formal complaint submitted in March 2016 by a Catholic priest, Father Stanslaus Muyebe, the Gupta's alleged influence became the subject of an investigation into "state capture" by outgoing Public Protector Thuli Madonsela. President Zuma and Minister Des van Rooyen applied for an interdict to prevent the publication of the report on 14 October 2016, Madonsela's last day in office. Van Rooyen's application was dismissed, and the President withdrew his application, leading to the release of the report on 2 November. The report recommends the establishment of a judicial commission of enquiry into the issues identified.

The report recommends that a full probe of Mr. Zuma's dealings with the Guptas should be conducted by a commission of inquiry, with the findings published within 180 days. Zuma and Des van Rooyen have since denied any wrongdoing.

The Gupta's lawyer disputed the evidence in the report. The Gupta family have denied any wrongdoing and welcomed the opportunity to challenge the report's findings in an official judiciary inquiry.

On 25 November 2016, Zuma announced that the presidency would be reviewing the contents of the state capture report. He said it "was done in a funny way" with "no fairness at all" and argued he was not given enough time to respond to the public protector.

In late May 2017 a number of emails were leaked to the public from the Guptas and their associates implicating them in efforts to appoint government ministers and heads of government owned companies in addition to coordinating activities with political figures associated with President Zuma for their own personal gain. Most notable were efforts to appoint Gupta friendly executives for Transnet, Eskom, the appointment of Mosebenzi Zwane as minister of mineral resources. The ANC Youth League and the pro-Gupta political party Black First Land First (BLF) disputed the authenticity of the emails whilst the Communist Party of South Africa stated that the emails "look genuine".

=== Mining and energy interests ===
Oakbay Resources and Energy is a mining and processing company run by the Guptas that began trading on the JSE on 28 November 2014.

==== Iron ore dispute ====
In 2010, the Gupta-owned firm Imperial Crown Trading (ICT), along with Duduzane Zuma who was a part owner in ICT, were involved in a dispute with ArcelorMittal and Anglo American plc over the rightful ownership of Kumba Iron Ore, which owns Sishen mine, one of Africa's largest iron mines. The Department of Mineral Resources granted the ICT 21.4% ownership in the mine when ArcelorMittal did not renew their mining licence in time. The case was taken to the Constitutional Court where, in 2013, it was ruled that the Gupta/Zuma consortium could not claim rightful ownership. Had they won the case, ArcelorMittal would have had to pay them R800 million (US$80 million).

==== Coal ====
The South African Sunday Times alleged that a Gupta owned company, Tegeta, benefited from official connections in the awarding of a R4 billion contract to supply coal to the state electrical utility company Eskom. The Mines Minister Mosebenzi Zwane denied this allegation saying that he didn't give Tegeta any preferential treatment and was only interested in preserving jobs following Tegeta's purchase of a coal mine that supplies Eskom. According to the business rescue practitioners Tegeta will also take on the R2.4 billion penalty imposed by Eskom on Optimum for delivering poor-quality coal. On 12 June, City Press alleged that Eskom awarded Tegeta a contract worth more than R564 million, paying in advance in order to ‘bail out the Guptas’ and that it also allowed the company to divert a significant portion of Optimum's coal to another power station in order to be bought at a higher price. An executive for Eskom said that paying companies in advance has been done before and that Eskom was not diverting coal from the Hendrina power plant to the Arnot power plant. Nazeem Howa described allegations as "sublime and ridiculous" and that prepayments were a standard practice of Eskom.

On 8 September 2016, Nazeem Howa, the head of Oakbay Investments, told Bloomberg that Oakbay had signed a contract to export power-plant coal at a premium to the highest price it gets from Eskom of R150 ($11) per ton. He declined to comment on whether its export allocation was being sold.

==== Uranium interests, Nhlanhla Nene, Pravin Gordhan and KPMG ====
The family is alleged by the Rand Daily Mail to have worked closely with Zuma to secure interests in South Africa's nuclear energy sector. In 2014 the South African government announced that a 9 600 MW nuclear procurement programme that entailed the construction of six to eight nuclear reactors at an estimated cost of between R800 billion to R1.6 trillion (US$50 billion to US$100 billion) was under consideration. This proposal was approved by the Zuma cabinet on 9 December 2015. Zuma's controversial dismissal of then minister of finance Nhlanhla Nene on 9 December 2015 is alleged to have been partially motivated by Nene's department's resistance to the nuclear agreement. President Zuma stated that this move was motivated by Nene's nomination to head the African Regional Centre of the New Development Bank/Brics Bank. Zuma's statement was met with skepticism by the media and opposition political parties, partly because Nene was unaware of his nomination to the post.

Nene was briefly replaced with the little known David van Rooyen before public criticism, and a sharp decline in the South African Rand and stock market led to Zuma re-appointing former minister of finance Pravin Gordhan to the position instead. Strong links between both of Van Rooyen's top two advisers and the Gupta family came to light a few months after Nene's dismissal. Shortly after Gordhan's appointment an investigation was initiated by the Hawks into allegations of corruption whilst he was head of the South African Revenue Service. The investigation was criticised on legal grounds and for being politically motivated by a number of organisations and individuals including the South African Communist Party. Gordhan stated that the Gupta family was behind the charges. The Gupta family denied being involved in any effort to remove Gordhan from office, however, in 2017, much of Gupta auditor KPMG’s senior leadership in South Africa resigned, and a report, issued by KPMG in 2015, accusing Gordhan of improprieties was withdrawn, after an internal investigation found that the work done by KPMG for the Gupta family fell "considerably short" of the firm's standards, and amid a rising political and public backlash.

==== Power plants ====
The Gupta family was implicated in the alleged improper awarding of a contract to install a new boiler at the Duvha Power Station to Dongfang Electric after the Gupta connected advisory firm Trillian gave the Dongfang bid the go ahead. General Electric filed court papers stating that Dongfang was given the contract through a rigged tendering process by Eskom even though the Dongfang bid was R1 billion (US$76 million) more than the General Electric bid.

=== Railways ===
The Gupta family along with Duduzane Zuma have been implicated in an attempt to improperly influence the awarding of a R51 billion (roughly equivalent to US$6 billion in 2012) contract to deliver 600 trains to South Africa on behalf of the China South Rail company. In 2012 the former head of the South African Passenger Rail Agency (Prasa), Lucky Montana, wrote a letter detailing an attempt by the Guptas and Zuma to pressure then South African minister of transport, Ben Martins, and Montana, Prasa's then CEO, to favour China South Rail. The letter became public in June 2016 when Montana sent a copy to the amaBhungane Centre for Investigative Journalism.

==== SAP kickback allegations ====
In July 2017, SAP was accused of having paid CAD House, a Gupta-controlled company, R100 million in order to secure a Transnet deal in 2015. SAP denied the allegations, claiming that the money was paid as "an extension of the sales force", despite CAD House having no prior SAP experience. As a consequence of the allegations, SAP suspended some managers, and launched an investigation appointing an acting managing director for Africa while the investigation continued.

=== Armaments ===
VR Laser Services, in which the Guptas and Duduzane Zuma, President Zuma's son, own a 25% stake, entered into a partnership with the state owned aerospace and defence company Denel to establish Denel Asia, based in Hong Kong. The official opposition, Democratic Alliance have alleged that the establishment of the joint venture is illegal as certain provisions of the Public Finance Management Act have not been complied with. The Minister of Public Enterprises, Lynne Brown, confirmed that the Asian marketing arm of Denel was not in compliance with various legal provisions.

=== Media ===
The international news broadcaster Al Jazeera English has alleged that Zuma's close relationship with the Guptas has "translated into friendly coverage in the outlets they own," specifically ANN7 and The New Age. In 2022 the Zondo Commission found that the awarding of government tenders and state owned enterprise advertising contracts to The New Age defied both "logic and legal requirements."

==== Economic Freedom Fighters criticism ====
On 4 February 2016 Julius Malema of the Economic Freedom Fighters (EFF) announced that members of the press from Gupta owned media companies, ANN7 and The New Age, would no longer be welcome at future EFF media announcements. The EFF alleged that this was because of their role as being part of a "propaganda machinery" of a "corrupt cartel". He stated that the EFF "cannot guarantee the safety of those who are working in those studios and printing factories of the New Age and ANN7." The EFF criticised the "New Age Breakfasts", a series of breakfast events organised by The New Age with and often paid for by government departments, as well as accused the paper of receiving preferential treatment in receiving advertising contracts from government. A spokesperson for the African National Congress defended the Gupta family, stressing their history of investment in South Africa. A few days later the EFF released a list of 25 reasons why they are against the family, again accusing them of receiving preferential treatment in business dealings with government as well as government preference and collusion with Gupta owned media interests.

The EFF's perceived threats towards ANN7 and New Age employees caused a number of other media commentators and publications to criticise Malema's remarks as threatening media independence and advocating violence towards the media and a particularly strong rebuke from the New Age and ANN7. An anti-gag order disallowing the EFF from banning The New Age and ANN7 from EFF media briefings was issued by the High Court following Malema's remarks. The court also upheld the applicants’ rights and those of the Gupta family as South African citizens to remain in South Africa and carry out business operations. The judge presiding over the case concluded that Malema's statement was a "threat of violence" and said the Guptas and their employees "have a constitutionally protected right not to be threatened with violence".

==== Sekunjalo Investments dispute ====
In November 2012, the Gupta family, through Oakbay Investments, were granted an option to buy 50% of the shares of Independent News and Media South Africa, one of the largest newspaper operations in South Africa, after the company had been bought out by Sekunjalo Investments who was negotiating the purchase of the group from the Irish owned Independent News and Media. After the successful purchase of the group by Sekunjalo in February 2013 Oakbay sought to exercise its share purchase options. This led to disagreements between Oakbay and Sekunjalo about the true value and cost of the options and so they could not settle on an agreement as to how much Oakbay should pay for the shares. Ten percent of buyout by Sekunjalo was also funded by the South African Government Employees Pension Fund who had never agreed to Oakbay having the options and, when asked in early 2016, rejected Oakbay's request to exercise the option to buy 50% of the now Sekunjalo owned newspaper publishing company. This led to Oakbay taking Sekunjalo to court.

==== Public relations efforts and the Bell Pottinger controversy ====
"[T]he NEC expressed its utmost disgust at the arrogance, disrespect and reckless journalism displayed by the New Age Newspaper (18, 19 March 2016), ANN7 News Channel (16–18 March 2016) and representatives of the Gupta-family. They have characterized the ANC as a group of factions for and against President Zuma."

- Gwede Mantashe, ANC secretary general

To deal with mounting public criticism the Gupta family hired the public relations firm Bell Pottinger. In late February 2016 several internet-based sources were altered to be favourable to the Guptas. These included activities in Wikipedia, chat rooms, blogs and on news articles related to the Gupta family. It is thought by the Mail and Guardian that these favourable alterations were part of a sustained media campaign to improve the family's image.

After emails from servers associated with Gupta newspapers were leaked, Bell Pottinger was reported to be involved in substantial editing of this Wikipedia page about the Guptas; a Bell Pottinger employee was said to have emailed much of the content to a Gupta account for it to be uploaded.

In a statement to the Financial Times on 25 November 2016, Bell Pottinger stated that their role has been "to correct misperceptions" about Oakbay. They have intended to communicate that a competitive, disruptive, job-creating narrative is what is needed to achieve transformation in South Africa.

Gupta owned media outlets, ANN7 and The New Age, ran stories alleging an anti-Zuma plot by a faction within the ANC was one possible source of allegations against the Gupta family. Following the ANC's national executive council meeting in March 2016 the ANC's secretary general issued a statement criticising the coverage of the event by Gupta family owned media. In response ANN7 and The New Age agreed to publish an official apology to the ANC.

Bell Pottinger announced they had dropped the Gupta family as clients on 12 April 2017. This followed a Sunday Times article that claimed that the Gupta family and President Zuma worked with the firm to incite racial tensions using bots and sockpuppets on social media in an effort to manipulate public opinion. Leaked emails allegedly from the Guptas suggested that the family planned to deal with negative publicity by buying newspapers critical of the family such as Mail & Guardian.

Bell Pottinger went into administration (bankruptcy) in September 2017, as a consequence of the scandal resulting from activities undertaken by the firm on behalf of the Guptas, particularly its role in inflaming racial tension in South Africa.

=== Fake news ===
Media interests owned by Gupta were blamed by other South African media organisations and civil society organisations for running fake news campaigns against a number of individuals and groups judged hostile to Gupta interests. Targets included The Huffington Post, Sunday Times, Radio 702, and City Press in addition to individuals such as Finance Minister Pravin Gordhan who was seen as blocking Gupta attempts at state capture. Attacks against Gordhan focused on accusations of him promoting state capture for "white monopoly capital".

=== Corporate response ===
Due to the controversial nature of the family's relationship with Jacob Zuma numerous South African and international banking and auditing firms decided to end their business dealings with Gupta-owned firms in early April 2016. The auditing firm KPMG, the brokerage Sasfin Bank, and Barclays Africa's Absa bank as well as First National Bank all announced that they would no longer be dealing with the Gupta-owned Oakbay Investments, the holding company for the family's investments. Johan van Dyk at the South African financial forensics firm Censeo stated that companies were disassociating with the family due to concerns that an association with the family could cost them customers.

In response the Gupta-owned Oakbay alleged that this is "clear proof that the recent allegations against the company and the wider Gupta family are all part of a carefully orchestrated political campaign". Oakbay executives publicly repeated the accusation and went on to accuse South African businessman Johan Rupert of being involved in a conspiracy against them. Oakbay stated that Rupert, through the Rupert-owned Remgro investment company, had interests in the country's financial institutions and that this allowed him to influence banks so that they would stop doing business with Oakbay. Although Remgro had a 3.3% share ownership in FirstRand it did not have any investments or ownership in any of the other financial institutions Oakbay accused it of having.

On 8 April 2016, Duduzane Zuma, Atul Gupta, and Varun Gupta announced that they would be stepping down from their director positions at Oakbay Resources and Energy in response to mounting pressure. Oakbay stated that it had become nearly impossible to conduct business due to the business community's decision to discontinue doing business with the controversial firm. A few days later, Ajay and Atul Gupta along with other members of the family were reported to have left South Africa for Dubai. Julius Malema of the EFF, claimed that president Zuma illegally took out R6 billion (US$400 million) of the Gupta's money for them from South Africa when he visited the United Arab Emirates in March 2016.

The trade union and ANC political ally COSATU criticised the move by South African financial institutions to refuse to do business with Oakbay on the grounds that it was "political posturing" and put the jobs of thousands of South African employees of the firm at risk. On 20 June it was reported that the Gupta family were back in South Africa after an extended time away from the country.

On 8 September 2016, after announcing their annual results, Nazeem Howa told Reuters that the company was intending to urge the four banks that ended their relationships with the company to reopen their accounts. Howa was also quoted as stating that a judicial commission of enquiry into the banks would be the "best way" to shed light on the reasoning behind their decision to close the accounts with Oakbay.

=== Public response ===
Notable ANC members Ahmed Kathrada and Derek Hanekom called on the ANC to address public concerns relating to President Zuma's relationship with the Gupta family. Prior to criticising financial institutions for refusing to do business with Oakbay, the trade union COSATU called for Zuma to distance himself from the Gupta family. Following Kathrada's death in March 2017, Zuma was not invited to his funeral at the request of Kathrada's family, due to Zuma's controversial relationship with the Gupta family; former President Kgalema Motlanthe read an open letter from Kathrada, published a year before his death, in which he called on Zuma to resign.

A hacktivist group claiming to be associated with Anonymous launched a number of Distributed Denial of Service attacks on websites associated with the Gupta family in June 2016. Targeted Gupta-owned companies included Oakbay Investments, Oakbay Resources and Energy, The New Age (newspaper), Sahara (IT firm), and ANN7 (broadcaster).

South African artist Ayanda Mabulu exhibited a controversial painting criticizing Zuma's controversial and close relationship with the Guptas. The painting portrayed Zuma performing anilingus on Atul Gupta in the cockpit of an airplane with an ANC flag backdrop.

Zuma's relationship with the family became a campaign issue that negatively affected the ANC's performance in the 2016 South African municipal elections.

Following the dismissal of Gordan as Minister of Finance in April 2017, anti-Zuma protests were held across South Africa, including in front of the Gupta estate in Johannesburg.

== Financial transactions ==
In October 2016, the South African Minister of Finance Pravin Gordhan stated in court documents that the Guptas were implicated in "suspicious transactions worth R6.8 billion". The court documents were filed as part of a high court application explaining why the Minister of Finance could not intervene on the Gupta's behalf to require that South African banks continue to provide services to Gupta-owned companies. The documents stated that South African banks were alarmed by the financial dealings of 14 Gupta-owned businesses and discontinued services to the family to avoid possible legal implications.

The Gupta's lawyers publicly disputed Gordhan's statement and stated that a number of errors were made including that a number of the disputed transactions regarding one of the financial dealings, the Optimum mine, occurred when the mine was not yet under the control of the family. On 18 August 2017, the North Gauteng High Court dismissed Gordhan's court application seeking declaratory relief from having to intervene with the banks' decisions to close the bank accounts of the Oakbay investments.

An investigation by the South African-based amaBhungane Centre for Investigative Journalism alleges that the Guptas benefited from a number of state contracts using their political connections through a sophisticated system of financial dealings totalling up to R144 million (US$10.6 million) in only one six-month period.

A report compiled by the South African Council of Churches and South African academics stated that R40 billion (equivalent to US$3 billion) was illegally smuggled out of South Africa to Dubai by the Gupta family and their associated companies between 2011/12 and 2017. The money having allegedly originated from South African parastatials such as South African Airways, Eskom and Transnet.

The Gupta family has filed an interdict against its last remaining bank in South Africa, the Bank of Baroda, to prevent it from closing their accounts at the bank. The Bank of Baroda did this after flagging 36 suspicious transactions on Gupta linked accounts over a ten-month period valued at R4.2bn and amid accusations of the bank helping the family launder money. On 4 September 2017 the Bank of Baroda was fined R11 million (equivalent to US$837,000) by the South Africa Financial Intelligence Centre for flouting anti-corruption laws in transactions on accounts owned by the Gupta family.

By September 2017 two international and four South African banks had closed Gupta linked accounts they had held due to suspicious transactions.

== Investigations ==
=== United States of America ===
In October 2017, it was reported that the FBI had opened an investigation into Gupta nephews Ashish and Amol, who are US citizens, resident in Texas, as a result of payments received from a Gupta-linked company in the United Arab Emirates.

On 16 February 2018, two days after Zuma had stepped down as president of South Africa, Ajay Gupta was declared a fugitive from justice by South African authorities after failing to turn himself over to the authorities. This was later withdrawn by the National Prosecuting Authority after all charges against Ajay Gupta were dropped. The US Treasury imposed sanctions on the Gupta family and an associate for engaging in "widespread corruption and bribery" in October 2019.

=== South Africa ===
In January 2018, President Ramaphosa announced that there would be a Commission of Inquiry into State Capture, better known as the Zondo Commission, and this would be chaired by Deputy Chief Justice of South Africa Raymond Zondo. In 2022 the Zondo Commission found that multiple government ministers, senior ANC members, and the heads of state owned enterprises engaged in corrupt acts in support of the Gupta family. The commission specifically noted former Minister for Public Enterprises, Malusi Gigaba and the former head of Transnet, Brian Molefe, as engaging in wrongdoing on behalf of the family.

== Arrest and failed extradition ==
In 2022, an Interpol red notice was issued for the arrest of Atul and Rajesh Gupta to face fraud and money-laundering charges. The brothers were reportedly arrested in Dubai in the UAE on 6 June 2022 although the application to extradite Atul and Rajesh to South Africa was controversially rejected by the UAE on a technicality. It was reported in South Africa that both the public and South Africa were only informed of the failed extradition six weeks after the Guptas lawyers had been informed. The extradition refusal and subsequent release of the Guptas caused a diplomatic incident between the UAE and South Africa with both sides blaming the other for the failed extradition. Shortly afterwards the Bloemfontein High Court acquitted all the accused in the case for lack evidence.
