= Nhlanhla Nene =

South African politician (born 1958)

The Honourable Nhlanhla Nene MP
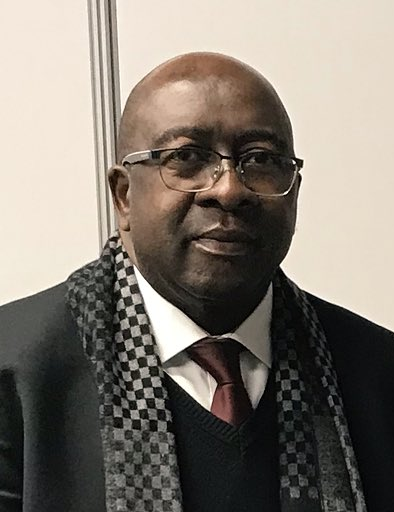
- Nene in 2018

Minister of Finance
- In office 27 February 2018 – 9 October 2018
- President: Cyril Ramaphosa
- Deputy: Mondli Gungubele
- Preceded by: Malusi Gigaba
- Succeeded by: Tito Mboweni
- In office 26 May 2014 – 9 December 2015
- President: Jacob Zuma
- Deputy: Mcebisi Jonas
- Preceded by: Pravin Gordhan
- Succeeded by: David van Rooyen

Personal details
- Born: 5 December 1958 (age 67) Kranskop, South Africa
- Party: African National Congress
- Education: University of Western Cape

Nhlanhla Musa Nene ([ntɬantɬa], born 5 December 1958) is a South African politician who served as the Minister of Finance under President Jacob Zuma from 25 May 2014 until his controversial removal on 9 December 2015, and under President Cyril Ramaphosa from 27 February 2018 until his resignation on 9 October 2018. He also previously served as the Deputy Minister of Finance in the Cabinet of South Africa from November 2008 to May 2014, as chairperson of the Finance Portfolio Committee in the South African Parliament, and as a Member of Parliament for the African National Congress (ANC) starting in 1999. His home is in Kranskop, KwaZulu-Natal.

== Education ==
Nene holds a B.Com Honours degree in Economics from the University of Western Cape (UWC). He also obtained a Diploma in Marketing Management DMS; an Advanced Diploma in Economic Policy from the UWC; a Certificate in Economic Policy from the University of South Africa (UNISA); and a Certificate in Macro and Micro Economics from the University of London. He also attended a Course in Evaluating Macroeconomic Strategies in 2000 at Williams College (CDE), MA, USA. He matriculated at Gcothoyi Adult Centre.

== Career ==
Nene was active in student politics in the 1970s, and became a member of African National Congress (ANC) Regional Executive Committee, Bambatha region where he became a Chairperson of the Bambatha Branch.

He worked as a Regional Administrative Manager for Metropolitan Life Insurance for 15 years. He became a labour union shop steward and led a negotiating team for better working conditions during the period 1990 to 1995 and he organised the first ever strike in the financial sector, under the banner of SACAWU, while working at Metropolitan Life Insurance Company in 1990.

He served as regional secretary of ANC Ukhahlamba region from 1997 until 2000 and as a chairperson of Kranskop Policing Forum from 1997 to 1999. He became ANC Local Government councillor and caucus chairperson from 1996 until 1999 and chairperson of Ntunjambili Development Forum from 1994 until 1999.

He became a Member of Parliament in 1999, and as an MP was a co-chairperson of Joint Budget Committee from October 2002 to August 2005 and a chairperson of the Portfolio Committee on Finance from 2005 until 2008.

== Political career ==
As a new Member of Parliament, Nene served on the finance committee, which Barbara Hogan chaired between 1999 and 2004. He has said he had a great deal of respect for her and her "no nonsense" ways.

Nene held the Chair of the Joint Budget Committee and is currently a member of the ANC Regional Executive Committee for the Bambatha region. Previously he has held the position of ANC Secretary for the Bambatha region. As chairman of the portfolio finance committee, he has said that it is "not proper" for parliament to be involved in process of drafting the budget, adding "Parliament has an oversight responsibility with regard to the budget so [our effectiveness] depends on how well we use the parliamentary process." In 2008 when Parliament passed legislation that would give them more control over budgeting, Nene expressed concern, stressing that "utmost care should be taken that parliament does not undermine macroeconomic stability."

Earlier, he had been mentioned as a possible successor to Finance Minister Trevor Manuel in a possible Jacob Zuma-led ANC administration in 2009. In November 2008 President Kgalema Motlanthe appointed Nene as South Africa's Deputy Minister of Finance. Nene replaced Jabu Moleketi, who resigned after the recall of president Thabo Mbeki. Nene was appointed the new Minister of Finance on 25 May 2014. Nene status as to whether he is either the first or the second black Minister of Finance of South Africa is disputed.

Nene was hailed by financial analysts as a good finance minister who criticized several government spending plans, including a plan to build several nuclear plants.

=== 2015 removal as Finance Minister ===
On 9 December 2015, President Jacob Zuma issued a statement removing Finance Minister Nhlanhla Nene from his post without outlining the reasons: "I have decided to remove Mr Nhlanhla Nene as Minister of Finance, ahead of his deployment to another strategic position. Mr Nene has done well since his appointment as Minister of Finance during a difficult economic climate. Mr Nene enjoys a lot of respect in the sector locally and abroad, having also served as a Deputy Minister of Finance previously."

Nene was replaced by ANC back-bencher David van Rooyen. Markets reacted extremely negatively to Nene's replacement by Van Rooyen, and South African Rand dropped as much as 5.4 percent against the dollar in a single day. The FTSE/JSE financial 15 index fell 13.36%‚ the FTSE/JSE banks index dropped 18.54% and the FTSE/JSE all-share index shed 2.94%. The market capitalisation of the whole JSE went down by 1.49% to R11.18 trillion‚ a loss of R169.6-billion. The benchmark government bond‚ the R186‚ which was trading on a yield of 8.66% at the beginning of the week‚ ended the week at 10.40%. Within days, van Rooyen was removed as Finance Minister and replaced by Pravin Gordhan.

The Presidency announced that Nene had been nominated to lead the African Regional Center of the New Development Bank/BRICS Bank in Johannesburg. Nene however indicated in the Financial Mail that he had not received official confirmation of this nomination, and the nomination did not materialise.

In a Sunday newspaper Nene said he had acted "in the best interest" of the country when he took on President Jacob Zuma's close ally, SAA chairwoman Dudu Myeni.

Nene initially returned to Parliament, but resigned as an MP later that month.

=== Second term as Finance Minister in 2018 ===
Cyril Ramaphosa succeeded Zuma as President of South Africa in early 2018, and appointed Nene as Finance Minister. Nene resigned on 9 October 2018, following his admission that he had visited the controversial Gupta family on several occasions. Tito Mboweni was appointed to succeed him.

== Other activities ==
- African Development Bank (AfDB), Ex-Officio Member of the Board of Governors (since 2018)
- Joint World Bank-IMF Development Committee, Member (since 2018)
- Multilateral Investment Guarantee Agency (MIGA), World Bank Group, Ex-Officio Member of the Board of Governors (since 2018)
- World Bank, Ex-Officio Member of the Board of Governors (since 2018)

== 2008 chair mishap ==
In 2008, Nene went viral online after a 26-second clip of him falling from his chair while being interviewed on View from the House was uploaded to YouTube. The fall occurred while Nene was answering questions on Finance Minister Trevor Manuel's mini-budget. During the interview, Nene's chair audibly cracked, causing him to wince though he kept speaking. Twelve seconds after the cracking sound, his chair broke completely, causing Nene to fall backwards, his hands grabbing at the desk as the chair collapsed beneath him. Presenter Hayde Fitzpatrick remained emotionless as the camera quickly switched to her. The program then went to a commercial break while the producers ascertained Nene's condition. He was unharmed and the interview continued with Nene in a different chair.

The incident led to an apology from the South African Broadcasting Corporation (SABC) after the clip was leaked onto the internet. SABC spokesperson Kaizer Kganyago called the event "unforeseeable and an accident," adding that "Mr. Nene must be applauded for being a true professional. He carried on with the interview after a short ad break." The video was viewed 498,000 times on 27 October 2008 and was shared on viral video websites and social networks.

Though Nene has said that the incident would not be good for his public image he later joked about it, stating that he had asked colleagues not to refer to his job title of Chair of the Committee whilst in his company. One colleague quipped that perhaps Nene should give up his chairmanship of the portfolio finance committee to lead a standing committee instead. Nene's office was swamped by media requests, and Nene stated he no longer wished to talk about the matter. He denied that his weight was responsible for the chair's failure, saying "I know I am heavy but I sit on these chairs all the time. It can't be my weight." He indicated that his children have been teased about the incident at school by classmates, and he reportedly sought legal advice concerning his rights and options regarding the way the video was leaked.

Political offices
| Preceded by Pravin Gordhan | Minister of Finance; 2014–2015 | Succeeded by David van Rooyen |
| Preceded by Malusi Gigaba | Minister of Finance; 2018 | Succeeded by Tito Mboweni |
