= Pravin Gordhan =

South African politician (1949–2024)

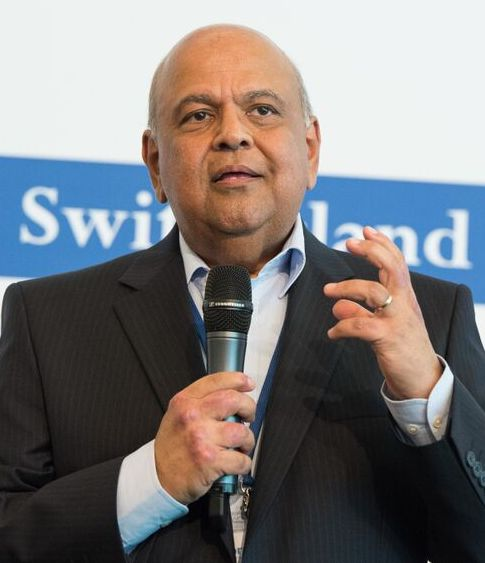
- Gordhan in 2015

Minister of Public Enterprises
- In office 28 February 2018 – 19 June 2024
- President: Cyril Ramaphosa
- Preceded by: Lynne Brown
- Succeeded by: position abolished

Minister of Finance
- In office 14 December 2015 – 31 March 2017
- President: Jacob Zuma
- Deputy: Mcebisi Jonas
- Preceded by: David van Rooyen
- Succeeded by: Malusi Gigaba
- In office 11 May 2009 – 25 May 2014
- President: Jacob Zuma
- Preceded by: Trevor Manuel
- Succeeded by: Nhlanhla Nene

Minister of Cooperative Governance and Traditional Affairs
- In office 25 May 2014 – 14 December 2015
- President: Jacob Zuma
- Preceded by: Solomon Lechesa Tsenoli
- Succeeded by: David van Rooyen
Additional offices 1994–2024
Member of the National Assembly of South Africa
In office May 2009 – 26 May 2024
In office April 1994 – November 1999
Constituency	Durban
Commissioner of the South African Revenue Service
In office November 1999 – May 2009
President	Jacob Zuma
Preceded by	Trevor van Heerden
Succeeded by	Oupa Magashule

Personal details
- Born: Pravin Jamnadas Gordhan; 12 April 1949 Durban, Natal, Union of South Africa
- Died: 13 September 2024 (aged 75) Johannesburg, Gauteng, South Africa
- Party: South African Communist Party (before 2009); African National Congress (2009–2024)
- Spouse: Vanitha
- Children: Anisha and Priyesha Gordhan
- Education: University of Durban-Westville
- Occupation: Politician; consultant; anti-apartheid activist
- Profession: Pharmacist

Military service
- Allegiance: Umkhonto We Sizwe
- Branch/service: Operation Vula (1986–1990)
- Years of service: 1970–1994
- Rank: Military operative

Pravin Jamnadas Gordhan (12 April 1949 – 13 September 2024) was a South African politician and anti-apartheid activist who held various ministerial posts in the Cabinet of South Africa. He served as Minister of Finance from 2009 until 2014, and again from 2015 until 2017, as Minister of Cooperative Governance and Traditional Affairs from 2014 until 2015, and as Minister of Public Enterprises from February 2018 until June 2024, when the entire Department of Public Enterprises and its ministry were abolished following the 2024 general elections.

== Early years and education ==
Pravin Gordhan was born on 12 April 1949 to an Indian South African family, in Durban, and matriculated from Sastri College in 1967.

In 1973 he graduated from the University of Durban-Westville with a Bachelor of Pharmacy degree. He completed his pharmacy internship at King Edward VIII Hospital in 1974 and worked there until 1981.

== Early political activism ==
Gordhan became associated with members of the Natal Indian Congress (NIC) in 1971 and was elected to its executive council in 1974. During the 1970s, Gordhan helped establish grassroots organizations that became involved in underground activities and associated with the African National Congress (ANC) and later the South African Communist Party (SACP).

In 1981 the Natal Provincial Administration dismissed Gordhan from King Edward VIII Hospital for his political activities while he was in detention. He was released from jail in 1982 and received banning orders effective until June 1983. Gordhan became a key figure in the United Democratic Front (UDF) since 1983 when the NIC became an affiliated organization.

Gordhan attended the preparatory meeting for the Convention for a Democratic South Africa (CODESA) in 1991 as a joint NIC/Transvaal Indian Congress (TIC) representative, and was appointed NIC/TIC delegate to the steering committee responsible for organising CODESA 1. In 1993 he was appointed to the panel of chairpersons on the planning committee of the multi-party negotiation process.

== Career ==
Gordhan was previously the Commissioner of the South African Revenue Service from 1999 to 2009. From 1991 and 1994, he chaired the Convention for a Democratic South Africa, and he was the co-Chairman of the Transitional Executive Council, which prepared South Africa for the country's first non-racial election in April 1994.

As a member of parliament from 1994 to 1998, Gordhan chaired the parliamentary committee that focused on the implementation of the new Constitution and the transformation of local government in the post-apartheid.

Gordhan was chairman of the World Customs Organization from 2000 to 2006.

On 10 May 2009, President Jacob Zuma appointed Gordhan as Minister of Finance, succeeding Trevor Manuel. On 25 May 2014, he was replaced by Nhlanhla Nene as Minister of Finance.

In 2014, Gordhan was appointed the Minister of Cooperative Governance and Traditional Affairs, succeeding Lechesa Tsenoli who became Deputy Speaker of the National Assembly of South Africa.

On 14 December 2015, Gordhan was re-appointed Minister of Finance, replacing David van Rooyen who had been minister for four days.

In 2018, Gordhan was re-appointed to the Cabinet of President Cyril Ramaphosa as Minister of Public Enterprises, taking over from former Minister Lynne Brown. He would oversee state-owned enterprises including the likes of Eskom, SAA, Denel, and others.

Gordhan did not receive enough branch nominations to be included on the "Top 200" list of people nominated for election to the ANC National Executive Committee ahead of the party's 55th National Conference in December 2022. At the conference, he was one of a number of high-profile ANC leaders to lose their seats on the NEC.

Gordhan retired from politics at the end of the sixth administration of South Africa's democratic government. His intention to retire was announced in March 2024.

== Controversies and court cases ==
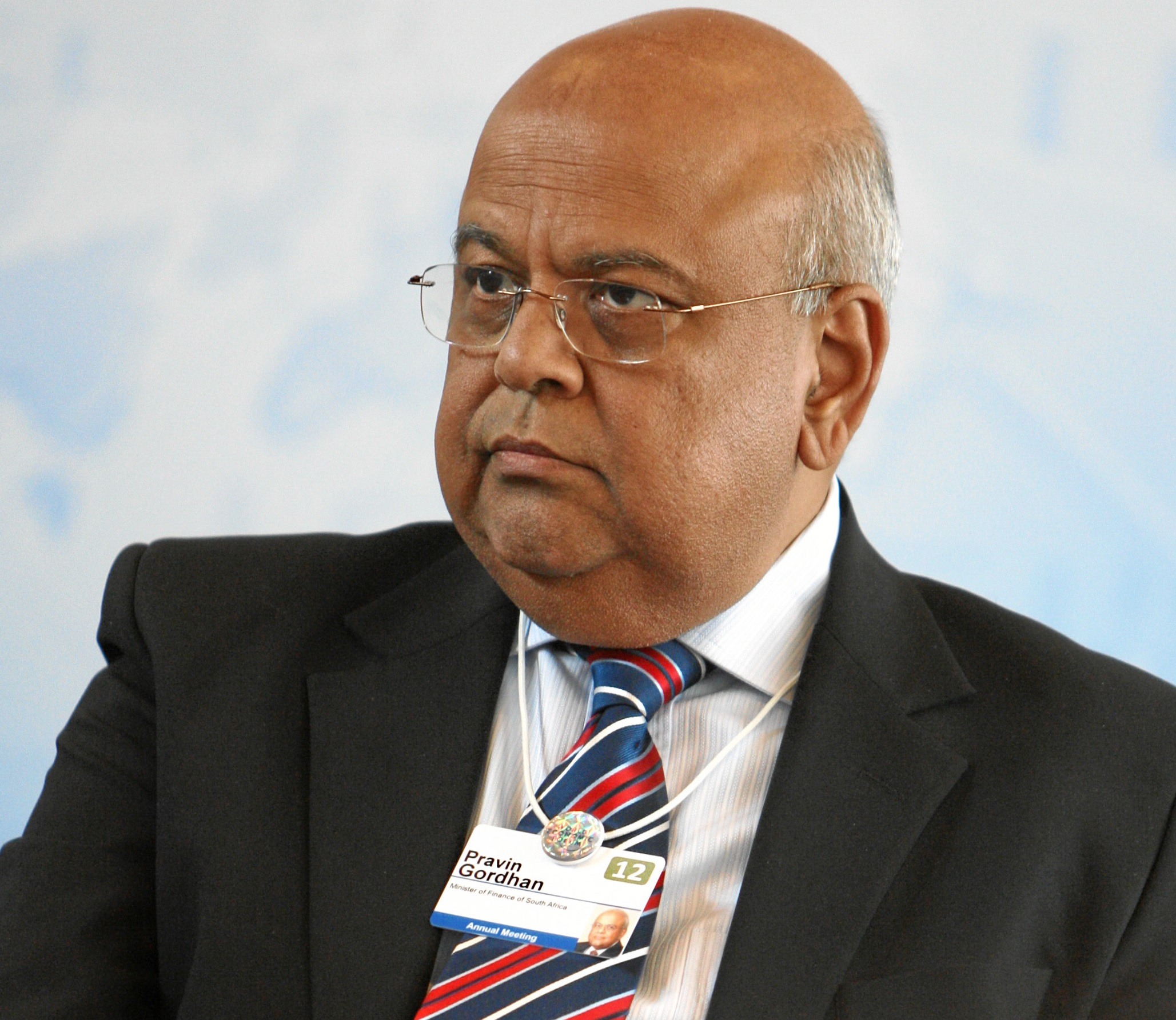
Gordhan during the WEF 2012

South African journalist Pieter du Toit has written that Gordhan has become target of a smear campaign by people involved in state capture related corrupt activities due to Gordhan's efforts to fight corruption; du Toit names people associated with the Gupta family, Economic Freedom Fighters (EFF), and factions within the ANC as being amongst Gordhan's harshest critics whilst also being implicated themselves in possible corrupt activities. Other people and organisations, including the Kathrada Foundation, author Pieter-Louis Myburgh, and journalist Ferial Haffajee. have also stated that Gordhan is the target of smear campaigns.

Controversial businessman Iqbal Survé had repeatedly accused Gordhan of targeting Survé's Sekunjalo Group while Survé and Sekunjalo companies faced fraud investigations by the FSCA and termination of banking services. Survé's accusations against Gordhan were found to be baseless and lacking in evidence.

Since becoming Minister of Cooperative Governance and Traditional Affairs, Gordhan's middle name, Jamnadas, has been used extensively by critics, most notably on Twitter, as a pejorative term and dog whistle to highlight his Indian ethnicity in a racially prejudicial way.

=== Rogue unit ===
On the eve of the 2016 Budget Speech that was to be tabled on 24 February 2016, a list of questions from the Hawks was sent to Gordhan. In total there were 27 questions around the alleged "rogue unit" at South African Revenue Service (SARS). Gordhan was the SARS commissioner in 2007, when the so-called rogue unit was set up. He has maintained that it was legitimate and had ministerial approval. Many questioned the timing of the questions sent including Gwede Mantashe, the Secretary General of the African National Congress (ANC). Gordhan himself was baffled by the questions, having the following to say "Once again, the Hawks and those who instruct them, have no regard for the economic and social welfare of millions". He then sent a letter to the Hawks through his department that he would be unable to meet the deadline imposed. The letter from his office stated that "He will respond in due course, once he has properly examined the questions and ascertained what information, of the information you request, he is able to provide". He also wanted to know from what authority the Hawks asked these questions of him. On 30 March 2016, he replied to the questions put to him by the Hawks. Gordhan was quoted, "I believe this was meant to intimidate and distract us from the work we had to do in preparing the 2016 Budget".

In September 2017, international auditing firm KPMG abruptly withdrew all of its findings‚ recommendations, and conclusions around its report into the SARS "rogue spy unit" which had implicated Gordhan. SARS Commissioner Tom Moyane disputed KPMG's withdrawal of the report withdrawal, calling it "unethical conduct", and claimed that the report is not flawed.

=== Hiring practices ===
In October 2016, South Africa's state prosecutor levied fraud charges against Gordhan for allowing a former colleague at SARS to take early retirement and then re-hiring them as a consultant. Charges were dropped a few days later. In October 2016, Gordhan lodged an application in the North Gauteng High Court to rule that he may not interfere with the major banks' decision to close the Oakbay Investments accounts. In August 2017, the court ruled against his application deeming it unnecessary.

=== Public Protector ===
In May 2019, Public Protector Busisiwe Mkhwebane released a controversial report recommending that the presidency take disciplinary action against Gordhan for past allegations of fraud at SARS. Gordhan's legal team challenged Mkhwebane's findings as being "totally wrong both in fact and in law". Mkhwebane publicly denied that it was part of a larger political struggle to target and discredit Gordhan. In July 2019 the Gauteng Division of the High Court of South Africa ruled that Mkhwebane's action as Public Protector against Gordhan be suspended, pending a judicial review of Mkhwabane's report on the SARS "rogue unit". The judge stated that a number of Mkhwebane's assertions were "vague, contradictory and/or nonsensical".

=== Sale of South African Airways ===
Gordhan was accused of orchestrating the sale of South African Airways (SAA) in "an irregular manner". Gordhan had planned to sell the state-owned airline for ZAR 51 to the Takatso group, but the deal was scrapped after two years in the making. This resulted in UDM leader Bantu Holomisa to call on President Cyril Ramaphosa to fire Gordhan.

Parliament's portfolio committee on public enterprises referred the matter to the Special Investigative Unit for further investigation, citing the importance of transparency and accountability and concerned about the undervaluation of SAA.

== Death ==
On 10 September 2024, Gordhan's family announced that he was admitted to hospital. At a press conference on 12 September, ANC secretary-general Fikile Mbalula said that Gordhan was in a "critical condition" and receiving the best care in hospital. Gordhan died from cancer at Wits Donald Gordon Medical Centre in Johannesburg, on 13 September. He was 75.

== Awards ==
Year	Country	Award name	Given by	Field of Merit
2019	India	Padma Bhushan	President of India	
2010	India	Pravasi Bharatiya Samman	President of India	Public service

=== Honorary degrees ===
- University of South Africa, Honorary Doctor of Commerce, May 2007
- University of Cape Town, Doctor of Law (honoris causa), June 2007
- Central University of Technology, Doctor of Technology (honoris causa), March 2009
- Sunday Times Business Leader of the Year, November 2016
- Henley Business School (University of Reading, UK), Doctor of Business Administration (honoris causa), November 2018

Political offices
Preceded by Trevor Manuel	Minister of Finance; 2009–2014	Succeeded by Nhlanhla Nene
Preceded by Lechesa Tsenoli	Minister of Cooperative Governance and Traditional Affairs; 2014–2015	Succeeded by David van Rooyen
Preceded by David van Rooyen	Minister of Finance; 2015–2017	Succeeded by Malusi Gigaba
