= Black First Land First =

- Abbreviation: BLF
- President: vacant
- Deputy President: Zanele Lwana
- Secretary General: Gandhi Baai
- Treasurer General: Thandiswa Yaphi
- Founded: 24 October 2015
- Split from: Economic Freedom Fighters (EFF)
- Student wing: BLF-Student Movement (BLF-SM)
- Ideology: Pan-Africanism; Sankarism; Revolutionary socialism
- Political position: Far-left
- National affiliation: uMkhonto we Sizwe
- Colors: Red, Green and Black
- National Assembly: 0 / 400
- National Council of Provinces: 0 / 90

Website
- blf.org.za

Black First Land First (BLF) is a political movement and political party in South Africa. It was founded in 2015 by Andile Mngxitama following his expulsion from the Economic Freedom Fighters (EFF), led by Julius Malema.

Mngxitama’s chief policy is ‘expropriation without compensation’ of white-owned land, which he declares to have been directly stolen from Africans. On this issue, he has accused EFF of selling out to the ANC, which he regards as too friendly to business interests. BLF has been supportive of South Africa’s ex-President Jacob Zuma, and has also shown support for the influential Gupta family. Some of its members have been accused of threatening investigative journalists.

In early-2019, the Freedom Front Plus (FF+) appealed to have the BLF deregistered. The Independent Electoral Commission (IEC) officially annulled the party registration on 15 July 2019 as a result of its violation of the Electoral Act, which prohibits limiting membership on the basis of race. The Electoral Court dismissed BLF's appeal in November 2019 and upheld an earlier ruling that the organisation can not be registered as a political party.

In November 2019, the movement decided to amend its constitution to allow Whites to be members of the movement. In an interview a few days later, the movement's Zanele Lwana slammed the media for "deliberately reporting untruthfully on what happened" in the conference. It appears that the alleged amendment of the BLF constitution to allow Whites was false because BLF leader Andile Mngxitama confirmed that "Whites still not allowed in the party" The movement's Deputy President said that the motive was more to allow its admittance on the IEC rather than to welcome Whites.

In November 2020, the BLF was re-registered as a political party by IEC.

In January 2024, party leader Andile Mngxitama announced that he had joined uMkhonto weSizwe, although he stated that BLF would not cease to exist, and that it was an electoral pact.

== History ==
Andile Mngxitama served as an EFF member of parliament after the party won 25 seats in the 2014 general election, the first elections ever contested by the EFF after their founding the previous year. Mngxitama became unhappy with EFF leadership after its inaugural elective conference in December 2014. He accused EFF leadership, and in particular its founder Julius Malema, of having the "same tendencies as the ANC", a party that Malema had been expelled from in 2012. These accusations caused a rift in the EFF, a rift that widened in February 2015 when the two sides "came to blows" following accusations that Malema had made a deal with the ANC to help get Mngxitama and his sympathisers out of parliament. Mngxitama and two of his comrades, Mpho Ramakatsa and Khanyisile Litchfield-Tshabalala, were expelled in April.

Mngxitama was perturbed by this development, and condemned the EFF of being a "watered-down version of the ANC". His main policy disagreement was the EFF's abandonment of his ideas of land reform, the "principle of expropriation without compensation" of white-owned land. This had always been an essential issue for Mngxitama, who had voiced his opinion to no avail during his tenure on the parliamentary Committee on Rural Development and Land Reform. He accused Malema of "selling out" on the issue, labelling him a "revisionist". This stated commitment to radical land reform would become the selling point of the Black First Land First manifesto.

In 2016-2017, after accusing the EFF of having the same tendencies as the ruling ANC, BLF came out in support of former ANC and South African President Jacob Zuma, who has faced numerous corruption charges. BLF have also shown support for the controversial Gupta family, who have been widely accused of "capturing" the South African state through their dealings with Zuma. Questions have been asked to what extent the Guptas have been funding Andile Mngxitama and BLF, and whether the Guptas intended to use BLF to escalate racial tensions in order to distract from their controversial activities.

In August 2017, Mngxitama exhorted the South African Reserve Bank to seize white farms and to initiate the formation of a black bank.

In July 2017, e-mails surfaced suggesting that Mngxitama received instructions from the Gupta family and their contracted PR company Bell Pottinger. Bell Pottinger was subsequently suspended by the British Public Relations and Communications Association for "exploiting and creating racial divisions in South Africa" for five years.

== Policies ==
In its "Revolutionary Call" released on 13 August 2015, BLF notes that, "[w]ithout land there is no freedom or dignity. We want Land First because it is the basis of our freedom, our identity, our spiritual well-being, our economic development and culture. The land of Africans was stolen and this theft has rendered us landless in our own land. We want all the land with all of its endowments on its surface together with all the fortunes underground as well as the sky. All of it belongs to us! We are a people crying for our stolen land! Now we have decided to get it back by any means necessary" SCI: "By any means necessary means without regard to famine, bloodshed or deteriorating as Zimbabwe did as our spiritual well-being demands it".

Founder Mngxitama also made it clear that BLF has a policy called "Code of dealing with house negroes and sell outs". This is a ten-point code touted as a guide for party members to defend black people they differ with who come under attack from white supremacy.

== Colours and logo ==
The logo of the Black First Land First (BLF) movement is the Sankofa Bird, forming part of a clenched black fist, with the base forming a fountain pen. The Sankofa Bird is a symbol for understanding a people engaged in the struggle for freedom through the power of revolutionary historical lessons. In this regard, the Sankofa bird, while looking backwards, flies forward with an egg in its mouth. The clenched black fist symbolises Black Power, and the fountain pen signifies the importance of revolutionary theory as a guide to action in the revolutionary struggle. At the centre of the Sankofa's wing is the five pointed red star. The five-pointed red star symbolises socialism and the blood of blacks whose lives were lost through the anti-blackness of white supremacy. Moreover, the five points of the star represent the five continents and hence an internationalist outlook in pursuit of the total freedom of all the oppressed peoples of the world. The circle is coloured in green to signify the Land and all the minerals beneath it that must be returned to the people. The circle itself, with its red outer and black inner boundary lines, serves to protect the people engaged in revolution.

== Structure ==
According to its Constitution, The BLF operates under the Leninist party organisational structure known as democratic centralism. (Note: Constitution Section 3.13) There are 4 chief organs of the party, arranged in the following hierarchy: (Note: Constitution Section 7.1)

1. The National Imbizo which elects the National Coordinating Committee
2. The Provincial Imbizo which elects the Provincial Coordinating Committee
3. The Regional Imbizo which elects the Regional Coordinating Committee
4. The Branch Biennial General Imbizo which elects the Branch Coordinating Committee

The National Imbizo, as the supreme ruling body, will convene at least once every 5 years. It is responsible for electing the members of the National Coordinating Committee (NCC) including the Secretary General. (Note: Constitution Section 11.1) This is very similar to the relationship between the Party Congress and the Central Committee in Marxist–Leninist parties. The BLF Constitution mandates the 50% of the seats in both the NCC and its subcommittee, the Central Committee (CC), be occupied by women. (Note: Constitution Section 12.3-12.8) The lower level Imbizos and Coordinating Committees function in a similar fashion. (Note: Constitution Section 17-22)

== Ideology ==
Mngxitama has stated that the party's core ideologies are Black Consciousness and Pan-Africanism with a Sankarist leadership ethos. BLF describes itself as a "vanguard organisation". The party believes that no revolution can take place without raising the consciousness of the people against the enemy so as to resolve the contradictions via the revolutionary process itself. The party was registered with the Independent Electoral Commission and contested the 2019 elections but won no representation in parliament or the provincial legislatures. The party's registration was annulled on 15 July 2019.

== Controversies ==
=== Threatening of politicians ===
In July 2017 a BLF member was accused of harassing and sending death threats to ANC MP Makhosi Khoza following Khoza's criticisms of President Zuma. Khoza was among a few ANC Members of Parliament urging other members to vote with their conscience in a vote of no confidence against President Jacob Zuma. In a series of text messages, Khoza was urged to vote against the motion of no confidence against President Jacob Zuma or face death. Threats escalated towards Khoza's children and Khoza was also told that she had 21 days to live. Founder Mngxitama denied the accusations and argued that Khoza is loud and irrelevant, as well as that Khoza is black and that BLF will never threaten a black person. Mngxitama further stated that there must be a white person behind the threats.

BLF Launched their own investigation into the accusations regarding the threats against Makhosi Khoza. BLF argued that Daily Maverick is a white monopoly capital publication that manufactured the story to increase Makhosi Khoza's public image in order to facilitate in a pro-white monopoly capital break-away party from the ANC.

=== Harassment of journalists ===
==== Ferial Haffajee ====
Mngxitama has been implicated in a sexual smear campaign against former HuffPost editor-at-large Ferial Haffajee. Various images of Haffajee came to light with amateur photo manipulation depicting Haffajee in various acts with South African businessman Johann Rupert. An army of fake Twitter accounts, also known as "Paid Twitter", retweeted and spread the images over social media. The only real accounts found spreading the images were BLF leader Andile Mngxitama, Decolonisation Foundation's Mzwanele Manyi and Uncensored Opinion's Pinky Khoabane. The Paid Twitter campaign has since been linked to UK-based PR firm Bell Pottinger, employed by the Gupta family to spread fake news and discredit journalists that speak out against President Zuma or the Gupta Family. BLF's sister publication, Black Opinion, has since expressed their discontent with Haffajee, stating that she is a Black Liberal acting in favour of white monopoly capital.

==== Peter Bruce and Tim Cohen ====
Tiso Blackstar editor-at-large Peter Bruce and Business Day editor Tim Cohen were intimidated and assaulted by BLF members after publishing an article about the Gupta family. The South African Human Rights Commission (SAHRC) expressed concerns over intimidation of journalists by BLF and cited the South African Constitution Section 15 and 16 addressing free press and freedom of religion and opinion. The South African National Editors' Forum (SANEF) applied for an urgent interdict to stop BLF members from harassing and intimidating journalists. SANEF further gave BLF the opportunity for assurance that they will not further intimidate journalists. BLF, however, declined and released a statement in which they listed other white journalists whom they indicated would be next on their target list. Among other parties who expressed their concern was the Ahmed Kathrada Foundation, who condemned the intended target list by BLF.

After being taken to court by SANEF, BLF, through their publication arm Black Opinion, accused SANEF of being racist white journalists and the poodle of white monopoly capital. BLF further accused the non-white journalists who form part of the SANEF court case as 'house negroes' who suffer from an identity crisis. BLF stated that they will take action only against the white journalists who form part of the court case.

==== Micah Reddy ====
BLF members were accused of harassing and assaulting investigative journalist for amaBhungane, Micah Reddy, following the filming of a televised debate on the subject of fake news in South Africa. BLF founder Andile Mngxitama was of the opinion that Reddy provoked BLF members and further stated that Reddy can be lucky he is black because BLF will never assault a black person.

=== Views on climate change ===
In June 2017, leader Andile Mngxitama blamed white monopoly capital for a severe storm that hit Cape Town the preceding week. Mngxitama is of the opinion that climate change is the fault of "capitalism and racism". Mngxitama stated that white people have assaulted nature and that Africa is now paying for these assaults. He further argues that there are no natural disasters, only white-made disasters such as droughts and earthquakes. Mngxitama also stated that the blame for deaths caused by the Cape Storm should be placed at the feet of the Oppenheimer and Rupert family as well as the Democratic Alliance.

=== Hate speech ===
In September 2018, Spokesperson Lindsay Maasdorp told The Citizen reporter Daniel Friedman that as a white person his existence is "a crime". Maasdorp also posted on his now-suspended Twitter account, in 2018, "I have aspirations to kill white people, and this must be achieved!".

In December 2018, in response to comments made by Johann Rupert in support of the South African taxi industry, Mngxitama asserted at a BLF rally that "For each one person that is being killed by the taxi industry, we will kill five white people", giving rise to the BLF slogan "1:5". Mngxitama went on to say, "You kill one of us, we will kill five of you. We will kill their children, we will kill their women, we will kill anything that we find on our way." The comments were criticized by many, including the African National Congress, with an ANC spokesperson claiming that "[Mngxitama's] comments clearly incite violence in South Africa" and urged the South African Human Rights Commission to investigate. The Congress of the People and Democratic Alliance also criticized the statements and filed criminal charges against Mngxitama for incitement of violence. Mngxitama's Twitter account was also suspended as a result. In response, the BLF’s deputy president, Zanele Lwana, responded that Mngxitama's comments were made in the context of self defence and "The only sin committed by BLF president is defending black people. President Mngxitama correctly stated that for every one black life taken, five whites would be taken!"

In March 2022 the Equality Court of South Africa ordered BLF members Lindsay Maasdorp and Zwelakhe Dubasi to pay R200,000 in damages and make a public apology for “celebrat[ing] the tragic deaths” of four children on social media in statements that were judged to be hate speech. The four children, all of whom were white, died when a walkway collapsed at Driehoek Highschool, VanderbijlPark.

=== Conspiracy theories ===
BLF has been criticised for endorsing a number of conspiracy theories, including "the Bill Gates Covid vaccine chip and 5G magnetising nonsense".

== Election results ==
=== National elections ===
Election	Total votes	Share of vote	Seats	+/–	Government
2019	19,796	0.11%	0 / 400	–	extraparliamentary

=== Provincial elections ===
Election	Eastern Cape		Free State		Gauteng		Kwazulu-Natal		Limpopo		Mpumalanga		North-West		Northern Cape		Western Cape	
Election	%	Seats	%	Seats	%	Seats	%	Seats	%	Seats	%	Seats	%	Seats	%	Seats	%	Seats
2019	-	-	-	-	0.13%	0/73	0.16%	0/80	-	-	0.09%	0/30	0.07%	0/33	-	-	-	-

=== Municipal elections ===
Election	Votes	%
2021	8,798	0.03%

== See also ==
- Azania in modern usage
