= South Africa–United Arab Emirates relations =

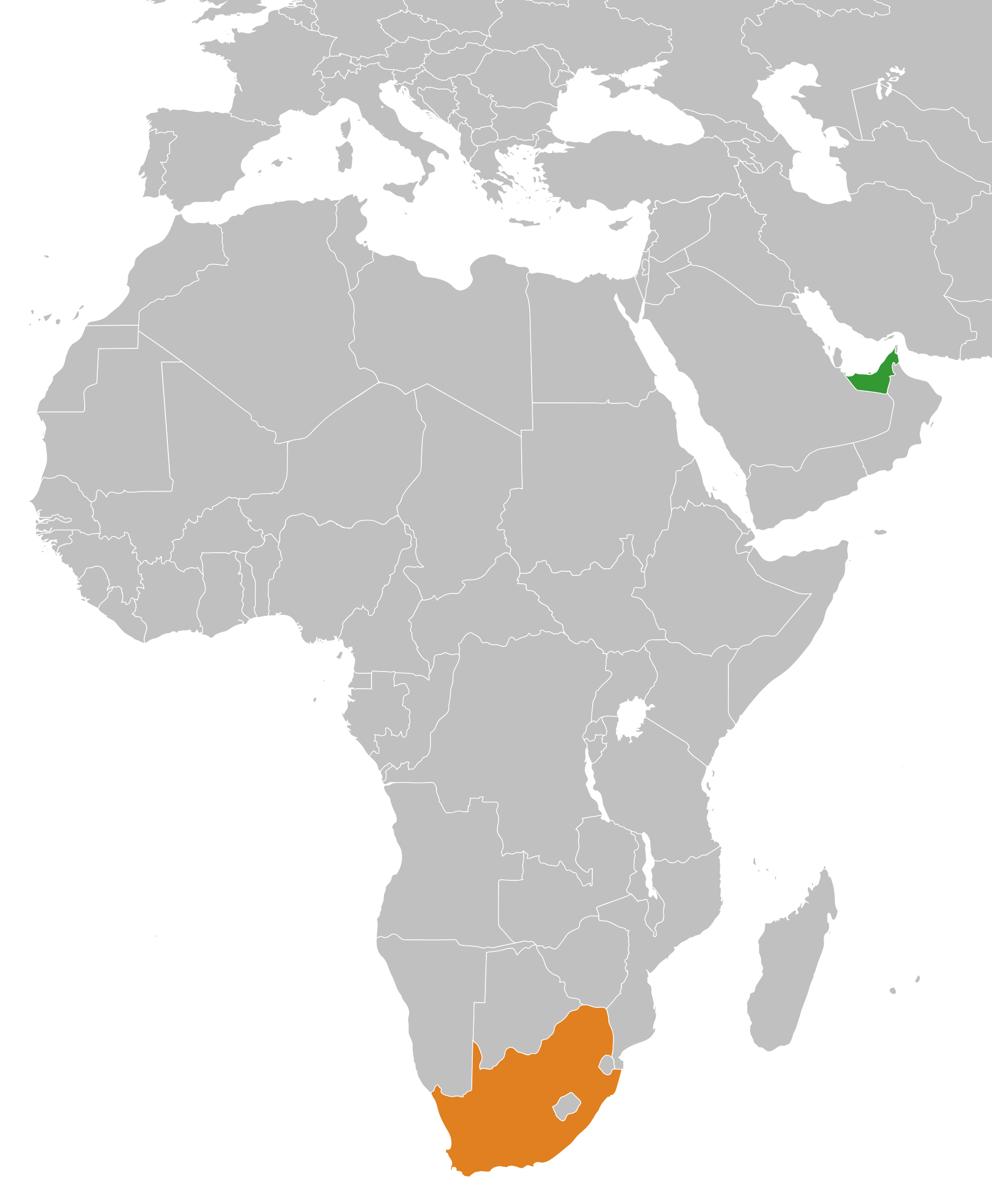

- United Arab Emirates: South Africa

Envoy

South Africa–United Arab Emirates relations refer to the bilateral relations between South Africa and the United Arab Emirates. South Africa has an embassy in Abu Dhabi. United Arab Emirates has an embassy in Pretoria.

== History ==
Diplomatic relations began when Sheikh Hamdan bin Zayed Al-Nahyan visited South Africa in 1994 for the inauguration of President Nelson Mandela. The first UAE ambassador arrived in South Africa on 12 November 1995.

== Economic relations ==
Economic ties between South Africa and the UAE have been particularly strong, with the UAE serving as an important trade and investment partner for South Africa in the Middle East. South Africa is one of the largest trading partners of the UAE in Africa, with bilateral trade between the two countries valued at over $3 billion in 2013. By 2021, South Africa exported US$4.47 billion to the UAE with the most significant exports being gold, diamonds and ferroalloys whilst the UAE exported US$ 2.4 billion mostly consisting of petroleum products and copper.

== Cultural relations ==
Cultural exchanges between South Africa and the UAE have also been significant, with both countries hosting various events and festivals to showcase their respective cultures. South African artists and performers have participated in events in the UAE, while Emirati cultural delegations have visited South Africa to promote intercultural understanding and cooperation.

== Gupta family incident ==
In recent years, there have been some challenges in the South African-UAE relationship. In 2022, two wanted fugitives, Atul and Rajesh Gupta, were arrested in the UAE on an Interpol red notice issued by South Africa to face fraud and money-laundering charges. The Guptas were controversially released by the UAE on a technicality with both government blaming each other for the failed extradition. It was reported in South Africa that the South African government was informed of the failed extradition six weeks after the Guptas lawyers had been informed thereby giving the Guptas time to leave the country. This caused a serious diplomatic incident between the two countries.

A few days after it was announced in South Africa that the Guptas would not be extradited to South Africa it was reported in the South African media that President of the UAE, Sheikh Mohamed bin Zayed Al Nahyan, and his family landed at the Waterkloof Air Force Base during their vacation to a South African game lodge in the Eastern Cape. The landing drew comparisons to the illegal landing of Gupta family members (known as Guptagate) at the same air force base to attend a wedding 10 years before. During the same trip Al Nahyan had also landed at Bhisho Airport following a R20 million upgrade to it paid for by the UAE.

== Resident diplomatic missions ==
- South Africa has an embassy in Abu Dhabi and an consulate-general in Dubai.
- the United Arab Emirates has an embassy in Pretoria.

== See also ==
- Foreign relations of South Africa
- Foreign relations of United Arab Emirates
