= Andile Mngxitama =

South African politician

Member of the National Assembly of South Africa
- Incumbent
- Assumed office 21 August 2024

Member of the National Assembly of South Africa
- In office 21 May 2014 – April 2015

Personal details
- Born: John Andile Mngxitama; July 7, 1969 (age 57)
- Party: Black First Land First (2015–2024)
- Other political affiliations: Economic Freedom Fighters (2013–2015) uMkhonto we Sizwe (2024–present)
- Profession: Politician

John Andile Mngxitama (born 7 July 1969) is a South African politician serving as a member of Parliament for newly formed UMkhonto WeSizwe Party in the 7th Parliament. Previously he served as the president of the Black First Land First party from October 2015 until November 2023. Moreover, he was a member of the Economic Freedom Fighters, he served as a Member of the National Assembly of South Africa for the party from May 2014 until his expulsion in April 2015.

== Economic Freedom Fighters ==
Mngxitama joined the Economic Freedom Fighters in its early days in 2013 and was ranked tenth on the party's national candidate list for the May 2014 general election. He was sworn in as a Member of the National Assembly on 21 May 2014 and was assigned to the Portfolio Committee on Rural Development and Land Reform in June 2014.

At the EFF's leadership conference in December 2014, Mngxitama declined the nomination to serve on the party's Central Command Team. He then became disgruntled with the party's new leadership. In February 2015, he accused the party leader Julius Malema and his former deputy and now president of Afrika Mayibuye Movement; Floyd Shivambu of making a deal with the African National Congress to get rid of seven EFF MPs. On 13 April, Mngxitama was expelled from the EFF and lost his parliamentary membership in accordance to the terms of section 47(3)(c) of the Constitution.

=== Black First Land First ===
In October of the same year, he formed the Black First Land First party. The party took vigorous positions in support of Jacob Zuma and the Gupta family. In July 2017, e-mails surfaced suggesting that Mngxitama received instructions from the Guptas and their contracted PR company Bell Pottinger. Bell Pottinger was subsequently suspended by the British Public Relations and Communications Association for "exploiting and creating racial divisions in South Africa" for five years.

The party pondered contesting the 2016 municipal elections. They did not contest it. Mngxitama has been a vocal supporter of the controversial Gupta family at the centre of state capture in South Africa. When a series of emails dubbed the Gupta Leaks came out detailing the family's corrupt relationship and involvement in manipulating South African politics, it was revealed that Mngitxama had asked the family for cash to fund Black First Land First.

The party did contest the May 2019 general election and won no representation in parliament or in the nine provincial legislatures. In July, the IEC announced the annulment of the party's registration, following an appeal by the Freedom Front Plus. The party appealed the judgement but it was upheld in November.

In January 2024, Mngxitama announced that he had joined the Umkhonto we Sizwe party, although he stated that BLF would not cease to exist, and that it was an electoral pact.

== Accusations of hate speech ==
On 8 December 2018, Mngxitama delivered a speech to a crowd of BLF supporters in Tlokwe, Potchefstroom in which he stated, "We will kill the white man’s children, we will kill their women, we will kill anything that we find in our way" and "for every one black person, we will kill five white people". He invited the crowd to participate in a call and response, asking "They kill one of us, we [will] kill how many?", to which the crowd would respond, "Five!" He brought up comments made four days earlier by Johann Rupert, where Rupert stated that he had his "own army" that would be remembered "when those red guys come" (presumably referring to the red berets frequently worn by members of the Economic Freedom Fighters.)

Three days later on 11 December, BLF held a press conference, where Mngxitama addressed his initial comments, saying that many videos of the incident "lacked context" and that his comments were made in self-defense in response a perceived threat of Rupert unleashing "black-on-black violence."

On 2 May 2023, AfriForum's complaint against the BLF and Mngxitama regarding his comments in 2018 were dismissed by an Equality Court due to "the complainants [falling] far short of presenting evidence" that such comments could be classified as hate speech given the guidelines outlined in PEPUDA.

In november 2026, Mngxitama became the centre of controversy once again after remarks on social media about a farm atack where a farmers ears were cut of. He stated: "Attacking the ears is symbolic to denote the refusal of land thieves to listen. No land, no peace".
