= Nigel Bruce (journalist) =

South African journalist and politician (born 1942)

Member of the National Assembly
- In office June 1999 – April 2004
- Constituency: Gauteng

Personal details
- Born: Nigel Strathearn Bruce; 30 November 1942 (age 83)
- Citizenship: South Africa
- Party: Democratic Alliance; Democratic Party

Nigel Strathearn Bruce (born 30 November 1942) is a South African journalist and politician best known as the former editor of the Financial Mail. He later represented the Democratic Party (DP) and Democratic Alliance (DA) in the National Assembly from 1999 to 2004, serving the Gauteng constituency.

== Career in journalism ==
Bruce worked at the FM for over two decades and as its editor for 11 years. Sanlam named him Financial Journalist of the Year in 1980, and he was awarded the Free Market Foundation's Free Market Award – for his "campaigning for economic and personal liberty" – in 1996.

In mid-1996, Bruce denied reports that he was involved in an attempted takeover of a rival magazine, Finance Week. However, in November that year, he resigned from the FM shortly after one of his columnists, David Gleason, became the major shareholder of Finance Week. According to Bruce, his already tense relationship with the management of the Times Media Group, FM's stable, became untenable after he allowed Gleason to write a farewell column in the FM despite objections from management. His departure from FM was not cordial, and he was openly critical of the board and management at the Times Media Group and its owner, Johnnic Holdings. He was succeeded as editor by Peter Bruce (no relation).

Later in November, Bruce became the editor of Finance Week, as well as a shareholder. After the magazine was bought by Naspers, he was also appointed to edit a sister publication, Finansies & Tegniek. He resigned from both positions in February 1999.

== Political career ==
After resigning as editor, Bruce announced that he would stand as a candidate for the DP in the 1999 general election. He was elected to a seat in the National Assembly, representing the Gauteng constituency. After the DP formally launched the DA, a multi-party coalition in opposition, in 2000, Bruce was appointed as the DA's spokesman on trade and industry. He was also a member of the Standing Committee on Public Accounts; in April 2002, he was nominated for the chairmanship of the committee but lost in a vote to the New National Party's Francois Beukman. He left Parliament after the 2004 general election, in which he was placed in an unelectable position on the DA's party list.

At the DA's federal congress in November 2004, Bruce and Sheila Camerer were awarded the party's annual award for fundraising efforts. He later served as chairperson of the DA's international ancillary, the DA Abroad, until 2021.
