= Welgevonden =

- Location within North West (South African province) Location within South Africa
- Coordinates: 26°9′50″S 26°48′59″E
- Country: South Africa
- Province: North West
- District: Dr Kenneth Kaunda
- Municipality: JB Marks

Area
  - Total: 2.09 km^{2} (0.81 sq mi)

Population (2022)
  - Total: 4,000
  - Density: 1,900/km^{2} (5,000/sq mi)

Racial makeup (2011)
  - Black African: 97.4%
  - Coloured: 1.9%
  - Indian/Asian: 0.2%
  - White: 0.5%

First languages (2011)
  - Tswana: 79.2%
  - Xhosa: 7.8%
  - English: 5.0%
  - Afrikaans: 4.6%
  - Other: 3.4%
- Time zone: UTC+2 (SAST)
- Postal code (street): 2710
- PO box: 2710
- Area code: 018

Welgevonden is a village in Dr Kenneth Kaunda District Municipality, North West Province, South Africa.
