= Des van Rooyen =

Ex-Finance Minister of South Africa (born 1968)

David van Rooyen

Member of the National Assembly of South Africa
- Incumbent
- Assumed office 21 August 2024

Minister of Cooperative Governance and Traditional Affairs
- In office 13 December 2015 – 27 February 2018
- President: Jacob Zuma; Cyril Ramaphosa
- Preceded by: Pravin Gordhan
- Succeeded by: Zweli Mkhize

Minister of Finance
- In office 10 December 2015 – 13 December 2015
- President: Jacob Zuma
- Preceded by: Nhlanhla Nene
- Succeeded by: Pravin Gordhan

Personal details
- Born: 20 November 1968 (age 57) Khutsong, Carletonville
- Party: uMkhonto we Sizwe (from 2024)
- Other political affiliations: African National Congress (until 2024)
- Education: University of Witwatersrand; School of Oriental and African Studies

David Douglas "Des" van Rooyen (born 20 November 1968) is the former Minister of Cooperative Governance and Traditional Affairs and Minister of Finance of the Republic of South Africa. He took office on 13 December 2015 and was dropped from cabinet on 27 February 2018 by President Cyril Ramaphosa.

He was elected as a member of the National Assembly, representing the uMkhonto we Sizwe, in the 2024 South African general election.

== Political career ==
=== African National Congress ===
Van Rooyen served as an operative and soldier of the African National Congress's paramilitary force, Umkhonto we Sizwe (MK), which was integrated into the South African National Defence Force by 1994. Van Rooyen has also held various leadership positions in labour and student organisations such as the COSAS, Khutsong Student Congress, United Democratic Front and National Union of Mineworkers.

Van Rooyen also held a number of leadership positions in the ANC from 1994 to 2007, during which he was elected as mayor of Merafong City Local Municipality in the central Gauteng province. He has been a National Assembly member since 2009 for Westville Westonaria City. Van Rooyen was the party whip in the National Assembly from 2009 to 2014 and the Whip on the Standing Committee on Finance and of the Economic Transformation Cluster of the National Assembly from 2014 to 2015.

=== Cabinet roles ===
Van Rooyen was appointed the Minister of Finance by President Jacob Zuma on 9 December 2015 after the removal of Nhlanhla Nene from the position. Van Rooyen was sworn into office the following day. The markets reacted negatively to his appointment as the South African rand dropped as much as 5.4 percent against the dollar in a single day. President Jacob Zuma reversed his decision late on 13 December 2015 when he announced that Van Rooyen would switch positions with then Minister of Cooperative Governance and Traditional Affairs, Pravin Gordhan. Van Rooyen and Gordhan took their new positions the next day without swearing in ceremonies as they were both already ministers in the government.

Van Rooyen's four-day tenure as Minister of Finance earned him the nickname "Weekend Special" in South African media.

=== uMkhonto we Sizwe Party ===
Van Rooyen joined the uMkhonto we Sizwe (MK) party in 2024, and represents the party in the National Assembly of South Africa.

On 4 November 2025, he was named MK's chief whip in Parliament, but his appointment was reversed by Jacob Zuma the following day, leading local media to draw parallels with his short tenure as Finance Minister.

== Education ==
Van Rooyen attended high school at Badirile High in Khutsong, Carletonville, where he led the student body in a youth movement. He was detained several times before he fled South Africa.

Van Rooyen earned an MSc in Finance (Economic Policy) from the School of Oriental and African Studies of the University of London (2014) and a master's degree in Public Development and Management from the University of the Witwatersrand (2009). He also holds a certificate in investment analysis and portfolio management from UNISA, as well as several other qualifications including Diplomas in Business Management, Municipal Governance, Councillor Development, Municipal Finance, and Economic & Public Finance.

== Private life ==
Van Rooyen owns a property in Suideroord, Johannesburg. According to the Parliamentary Register of Members' Interests, Van Rooyen is partner or director of several companies. He has personal interests in soccer, golf, tennis, reading and hunting.

Political offices
Preceded by Nhlanhla Nene	Minister of Finance; 10–13 December 2015	Succeeded by Pravin Gordhan
Preceded by Pravin Gordhan	Minister of Cooperative Governance and Traditional Affairs; 13 December 2015– 27 February 2018	Succeeded by Zweli Mkhize
