= South African National Defence Union =

Trade union in South Africa

SANDU
- South African National; Defence Union
- Founded: 1994
- Headquarters: Pretoria, Gauteng, South Africa
- Location: South Africa
- Members: 12 000
- Key people: National Secretary, Adv Pikkie Greeff
- Affiliations: None
- Website: https://www.sandu.co.za

The South African National Defence Union (SANDU) is a South African trade union for SANDF members. It is not affiliated to any trade union federation as state by COSATU. Military trade Unions in South Africa are by law not allowed to affiliate. SANDU is apolitical.

In April 2016, after the Constitutional Court found that President Zuma had failed to uphold the country's constitution, and Zuma responded with only an apology, the union backed mass action to remove the president.
