= Fatima Chohan =

South African politician

Her Excellency Fatima Chohan

Deputy Minister of Home Affairs
- In office 1 November 2010 – 29 May 2019
- President: Jacob Zuma
- Succeeded by: Njabulo Nzuza

Personal details
- Party: African National Congress
- Education: University of Witwatersrand Rhodes University

Fatima Ismail Chohan (formerly known as Fatima Chohan-Kota) is a South African politician and activist who is currently deputy chair of the South African Human Rights Commission. A member of the African National Congress (ANC), Chohan was formerly a member of the National Assembly of South Africa, where she served from 1996 to 2019.

From 2010 to 2019, Chohan served as Deputy Minister of Home Affairs under President Jacob Zuma. A Muslim South African, Chohan is a former member of the Executive Committee of the Muslim Student Society.

== Early life and education ==
Chohan completed her schooling in Laudium, Gauteng. She attended the University of Witwatersrand, where she received her B.Proc. degree. As a student, Chohan was a member of the Black Students Society from 1987 to 1990 and served as a member of the Executive Committee of the Muslim Student Society.

== Legal career ==
In 1998, Chohan was admitted to the Side Bar. Chohan was a legal advisor to the Gauteng Legislature and chairwoman of the Western Cape's Provincial Committee on the Magistrates Commission. She later became deputy head of Metro Legal Services in Greater Johannesburg.

== Political career ==
In 1996, Chohan became a member of the National Assembly of South Africa. During the presidency of Thabo Mbeki, Chohan was considered a "rising star" within the ruling African National Congress (ANC).

Chohan was appointed Deputy Minister of Home Affairs in November 2010 and was reappointed in May 2014, serving in the position until May 2019. In this role, Chohan was an outspoken supporter of liberal refugee resettlement policies. In the 2019 South African general election, Chohan served as a surrogate for the ANC's outreach into Muslim communities. However, as a result of the party receiving a reduced majority in the election, Chohan lost her seat in parliament.

=== South African Human Rights Committee (SAHRC) ===
In 2021, Chohan was recommended for the position of deputy chair of the South African Human Rights Commission (SAHRC) by the parliamentary committee on justice and correctional services. Since taking office, Chohan has advocated for an increase in funding for the SAHRC, arguing that budget constraints hinder the commission's activities.

== See also ==
- African Commission on Human and Peoples' Rights
- Constitution of South Africa
- History of the African National Congress
- Politics in South Africa
- Provincial governments of South Africa
