= Jeremy Gordin =

South African journalist, writer, and editor

- Born: November 25, 1952; Pretoria, South Africa
- Died: March 31, 2023 (aged 70); Parkview, Johannesburg, South Africa
- Cause of death: Homicide (house robbery)
- Education: Hebrew University of Jerusalem, Rhodes University
- Occupations: Journalist, author, newspaper editor
- Known for: Associate Editor of the Sunday Independent * Author of Zuma: A Biography

Jeremy Gordin (25 November 1952 – 31 March 2023) was a South African journalist, newspaper editor, biographer, and poet. He worked in senior editorial roles for major South African publications, including the Sunday Independent, The Star, and Sunday Tribune. He was also the author of a bestselling biography on former South African President Jacob Zuma.

== Early life and education ==
Gordin was born in Pretoria in 1952 and attended Pretoria Boys High School before pursuing his higher education in Israel, where he studied Hebrew literature and history at the Hebrew University of Jerusalem. He later returned to South Africa and completed a master's degree in journalism at Rhodes University in Makhanda.

== Career ==
Gordin began his journalism career in the late 1970s and over the course of his career, he worked in various capacities as a reporter, columnist, and editor.

=== Journalism and editing ===
Gordin held several prominent positions in South African print media. He was an Associate Editor of the Sunday Independent and also worked for The Star . He was an editor of the Sunday Tribune and a senior editor at the Financial Mail He was known for his political commentary, investigative reporting, and regular columns, which often appeared on platform outlets such as PoliticsWeb.

=== Publishing and literary work ===
In addition to his journalism work, Gordin was an author, biographer, and poet. He published collections of poetry early in his career and co-authored several investigative books. His most notable literary work was Zuma: A Biography (2008), an in-depth account of the life and political rise of Jacob Zuma prior to his presidency. The book became a national bestseller and was widely cited for its nuanced examination of South African political dynamics at the time.

== Death ==
On 31 March 2023, Gordin was murdered during a house robbery at his residence in Parkview, Johannesburg, at the age of 70. His death, suspected to be from possible poisoning for his critical reporting on corruption and the criminal justice system, led to widespread tributes from the South African media landscape, political figures, and civic organizations, highlighting his contributions to post-apartheid journalism and freedom of the press.

== Selected publications ==
- Gordin, Jeremy (1990). With the Eyes of the Mind. (Poetry)
- Gordin, Jeremy; Pauw, Jacques (1998). In the Heart of the Whore: The Story of Apartheid's Death Squads. (Contributor/Editor)
- Gordin, Jeremy (2008). Zuma: A Biography. Jonathan Ball Publishers. ISBN 978-1868422630.
