= Biznews =

South African business publication

- Biznews screenshot on 8 January 2024
- Type: Digital news
- Format: Online newspaper, Podcasts, YouTube, daily e-newsletter, annual conference
- Owner: self-funded
- Editor: Alec Hogg
- Staff writers: 10-15
- Founded: August 2013
- Language: English
- Headquarters: Hermanus, Western Cape, South Africa
- Country: South Africa
- Website: www.biznews.com

Biznews, is a South African daily business news online newspaper and news portal founded in August 2013 by Alec Hogg. Hogg previously founded and ran the South African business news publication Moneyweb before leaving in 2012 and founding Biznews the following year. The publication claims to reach one million visitors a month through its website, YouTube channel, daily newsletter and annual conference.
