= Jacob Zuma contempt of court =

2021 crime in South Africa

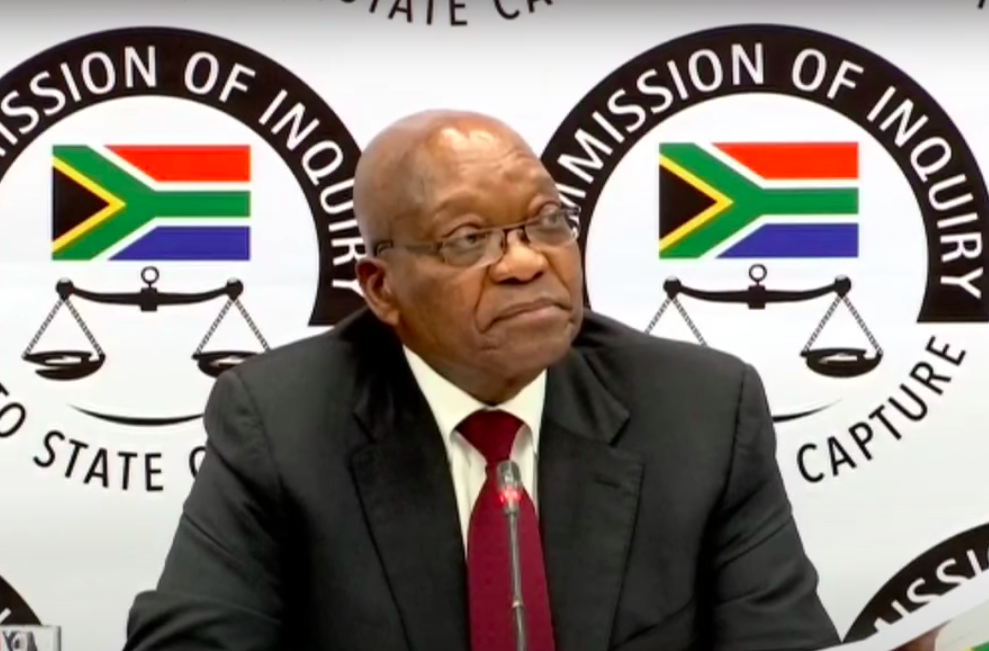
- Jacob Zuma's third and final day of testimony at the Zondo Commission, 17 July 2019
- Charges: Contempt of court
- Sentence: 15 months' imprisonment
- Disputants: Jacob Zuma; Zondo Commission
- Court: Constitutional Court of South Africa

Jacob Zuma, the former President of South Africa, was imprisoned on 7 July 2021 following a finding by the Constitutional Court of South Africa that he was guilty of contempt of court. The charges originated in Zuma's refusal to provide testimony to Deputy Chief Justice Raymond Zondo's judicial commission of inquiry into alleged state capture. During 2021, the Constitutional Court handed down three related decisions.

In Secretary of the Judicial Commission of Inquiry into Allegations of State Capture, Corruption and Fraud in the Public Sector including Organs of State v Zuma (known as Zuma I), the Zondo Commission applied urgently for a court order compelling Zuma to comply with the commission's summons and provide evidence before it. Zuma declined to oppose the application, and the Constitutional Court granted the order on 28 January 2021. The unanimous judgment, a straightforward application of the Commissions Act, 1947, was written by Justice Chris Jafta.

However, Zuma violated the court's order the following month, when he openly refused to comply with a summons to appear before the commission. Thus, on 29 June 2021, in Secretary of the Judicial Commission of Inquiry into Allegations of State Capture, Corruption and Fraud in the Public Sector including Organs of State v Zuma and Others (Zuma II), the Constitutional Court sentenced Zuma to 15 months' imprisonment for contempt of court. The majority judgment was written by Acting Deputy Chief Justice Sisi Khampepe, who held that it was justifiable for the court to impose a punitive, unsuspended prison sentence in order to vindicate its own integrity and uphold the rule of law. A two-member minority of the court, comprising Justices Chris Jafta and Leona Theron, argued that the majority's order trenched on Zuma's constitutional right to a fair trial.

Zuma, who had again declined to oppose the commission's application, submitted to arrest in Estcourt, KwaZulu-Natal on 7 July; observers linked his detention to an outbreak of civil unrest later the same week. At the same time, he applied to the Constitutional Court for the rescission of its order in Zuma II. On 17 September 2021, in Zuma v Secretary of the Judicial Commission of Inquiry into Allegations of State Capture, Corruption and Fraud in the Public Sector Including Organs of State and Others (Zuma III), the Constitutional Court dismissed that application, holding that Zuma's case did not meet the standard set for rescission in the Uniform Rules of Court and did not justify a departure from the doctrines of res judicata and functus officio. Justice Khampepe again wrote on behalf of a seven-member majority, and Justices Jafta and Theron again dissented in deference to Zuma's constitutional rights.

== Background ==
The Judicial Commission of Inquiry into Allegations of State Capture, Corruption and Fraud in the Public Sector including Organs of State (State Capture Inquiry) was established in January 2018 to investigate allegations of state capture and political corruption under the administration of Jacob Zuma, who was President of South Africa from May 2009 to February 2018. Chaired by Deputy Chief Justice Raymond Zondo, it was best known as the Zondo Commission and opened its hearings in August 2018, after Zuma had been replaced as president by his former deputy, Cyril Ramaphosa.

Because much of the commission's evidence implicated him directly, Zuma himself was scheduled to testify before the commission for five days in mid-July 2019, beginning on 15 July 2019, but he proved an uncooperative witness. Zondo adjourned proceedings before the end of Zuma's third day of testimony, on 17 July, in order to meet with Zuma to discuss his grievances. On the morning of 19 July, Zuma's lawyer, Muzi Sikhakhane, announced that Zuma would "take no further part" in the commission's proceedings.

Over the next 18 months, Zuma did not cooperate with attempts to secure his testimony before the commission. After he declined to resume testifying in the week of 21 September 2020, Zondo issued a summons for his appearance in the week of 16 November. However, on 29 October, Zuma lodged an application for Zondo's recusal from the commission's proceedings. Zondo considered that application into the week of 16 November, dismissing it on 19 November and announcing his intention to resume Zuma's testimony after a tea break. During the tea break, however, Zuma left the commission's premises without notifying Zondo. He did not return on 20 November.

== Zuma I: Court order ==
State Capture Inquiry v Zuma I
- Court: Constitutional Court of South Africa
- Full case name: Secretary of the Judicial Commission of Inquiry into Allegations of State Capture, Corruption and Fraud in the Public Sector including Organs of State v Jacob Gedleyihlekisa Zuma
- Decided: 28 January 2021
- Docket nos.: CCT 295/20
- Citations: [2021] ZACC 2; 2021 (5) BCLR 542 (CC); 2021 (5) SA 1 (CC)

Court membership
- Judges sitting: Jafta J, Khampepe J, Madlanga J, Majiedt J, Mhlantla J, Theron J, Tshiqi J, Mathopo AJ and Victor AJ

Case opinions
- Jacob Zuma is ordered to obey all lawful summonses and directives of the Zondo Commission and to appear and give evidence before the Commission on dates determined by it.
- Decision by: Jafta J (unanimous)

Keywords
- Commissions Act, 1947; direct access; witness before a commission

On 4 December 2020, the Secretary of the Zondo Commission, Itumeleng Mosala, announced that Zuma had been issued a second and third summons, compelling him to appear before the commission during the weeks of 18 January and 15 February 2021. At the same time, the Zondo Commission applied to the Constitutional Court of South Africa for a court order requiring Zuma to appear on those dates, as well as declaring that his departure on 19 November and non-appearance on 20 November had been unlawful. On 11 December, the court agreed to hear the urgent application later that month, though Zuma declined to oppose the application, with attorney Eric Mabuza filing a one-sentence submission stipulating that, "We are instructed by our client... that he will not be participating in these proceedings at all".

Secretary of the Judicial Commission of Inquiry into Allegations of State Capture, Corruption and Fraud in the Public Sector including Organs of State v Zuma (Zuma I) was heard virtually on 29 December 2020, with Tembeka Ngcukaitobi arguing on behalf of the Zondo Commission, instructed by the State Attorney. The Council for the Advancement of the South African Constitution and the Helen Suzman Foundation were admitted as amici curiae. While judgment was reserved, and as the scheduled 18 January hearing of the Zondo Commission approached, Zuma's lawyers wrote to Zondo to inform him that Zuma would not appear until the Constitutional Court had handed down its judgment.

=== Judgment ===
On 28 January 2021, the Constitutional Court handed down a unanimous judgment written by Justice Chris Jafta. The court granted the applicant direct access, accepting the commission's argument that it was important for the Constitutional Court to make an urgent and final determination on the issue, because an application brought in the High Court could lead to a prolonged process of appeals that might outlast the commission's own mandate. Although Jafta was critical of the commission for not having issued Zuma with summons earlier than the spring of 2020, he held that it was overwhelmingly in the public interest for the court to hear the application.

On the merits of the application, the court's judgment was primarily a straightforward application of the Commissions Act, 1947, section 3(2) of which empowered the commission's secretary to issue summons for the attendance of witnesses at hearings. The court confirmed that Zuma was obliged to comply with such summons, with Jafta commenting that:

The respondent’s conduct in defying the process lawfully issued under the authority of the law is antithetical to our constitutional order. We must remember that this is a Republic of laws where the Constitution is supreme. Disobeying its laws amounts to a direct breach of the rule of law, one of the values underlying the Constitution and which forms part of the supreme law. In our system, no one is above the law. Even those who had the privilege of making laws are bound to respect and comply with those laws.

The court therefore ordered that Zuma must obey all lawful summonses and directives issued by the Zondo Commission, and it directed him to appear and give evidence before the commission on dates determined by the commission. In addition, inspired by a threat made by one of Zuma's lawyers, the court issued a declaratory order stating that Zuma did not have a right to remain silent during the commission's proceedings – where he was a witness, not an arrested or accused person – but that he was entitled to all privileges granted to witnesses under section 3(4) of the Commissions Act, including the privilege to abstain from self-incrimination.

=== Reception ===
Although the judgment did not deal with substantive constitutional questions, it received significant media attention. Zuma released a six-page statement in which he denounced the judgment at length, saying that the Constitutional Court was "politicised" and had "effectively decided that I as an individual citizen, could no longer expect to have my basic constitutional rights protected and upheld by the country's Constitution."

== Zuma II: Contempt of court conviction ==
State Capture Inquiry v Zuma II
- Court: Constitutional Court of South Africa
- Full case name: Secretary of the Judicial Commission of Inquiry into Allegations of State Capture, Corruption and Fraud in the Public Sector including Organs of State v Jacob Gedleyihlekisa Zuma and Others
- Decided: 29 June 2021
- Docket nos.: CCT 52/21
- Citations: [2021] ZACC 18; 2021 (9) BCLR 992 (CC); 2021 (5) SA 327 (CC)

Court membership
- Judges sitting: Khampepe ADCJ, Jafta J, Madlanga J, Majiedt J, Mhlantla J, Theron J, Tshiqi J, Pillay AJ and Tlaletsi AJ

Case opinions
- Jacob Zuma is guilty of the crime of contempt of court for failure to comply with a court order to appear before the Zondo Commission. He is sentenced to undergo 15 months' imprisonment.
- Decision by: Khampepe ADCJ (Madlanga, Majiedt, Mhlantla, Pillay, Tlaletsi and Tshiqi concurring)
- Dissent: Theron J (Jafta concurring)

Keywords
- Contempt of court; direct access; judicial integrity; punitive costs; punitive sanction; right to a fair trial; rule of law; unsuspended committal

=== Background ===
Following the Zuma I decision, Zuma was summoned to appear before the Zondo Commission on 15 February 2021. However, on the morning of his scheduled appearance, his lawyers released a statement alerting the public that he had decided not to attend, in violation of the Constitutional Court's order in Zuma I. By then, the commission had laid criminal charges against Zuma in terms of the Commissions Act for breaching his summons in November and January. However, after Zuma's absence in February, Zondo announced that the commission would additionally seek to bring a contempt of court charge against Zuma in the Constitutional Court.

The Commission applied for direct access to the apex court on an urgent basis, giving rise to a second application, Secretary of the Judicial Commission of Inquiry into Allegations of State Capture, Corruption and Fraud in the Public Sector including Organs of State v Zuma and Others (Zuma II). In court papers, the Commission requested that a two-year prison sentence be imposed as sanction for Zuma's contempt. The matter was heard on 25 March 2021, with Tembeka Ngcukaitobi again arguing on behalf of the Zondo Commission. The Helen Suzman Foundation was admitted as amicus curiae.

Zuma again declined to oppose the application, though he released a public statement hours after the hearing in which he complained about "the emergence of a judicial dictatorship in South Africa". Zuma wrote:

We have in South Africa today the gradual entrenchment of the counter-majoritarian problem. Unfortunately, when people rise up against this judicial corruption, our young democracy will unravel and many democratic gains will be lost in the ashes that will be left of what used to be our democratic state... My experience is that many South African judges, including those of the Constitutional Court, can no longer bring an open mind to cases involving me. It is a travesty of justice to observe how the Constitutional Court has allowed itself to be abused in this manner, and the repeated warnings I have made in this regard continue to go unheard simply because they emanate from me.

=== Majority judgment ===
The court agreed unanimously to grant the applicant direct access; it was also unanimous in holding that Zuma was in contempt of court insofar as he had failed to comply with the court's order in Zuma I. However, the court split nine to two on the question of the appropriate remedy.

The nine-member majority sentenced Zuma to 15 months' imprisonment. Writing on behalf of the majority, Acting Deputy Justice Sisi Khampepe reflected broadly on the role of the judiciary, the importance of the rule of law, and the dual coercive (or remedial) and punitive functions of imposing sanctions for contempt of court. On the latter point, she held that it would be both "futile and inappropriate" to impose a coercive sanction, aimed at securing Zuma's compliance with the Zuma I order: futile because Zuma had demonstrated his brazen commitment to non-compliance, and inappropriate because of the exceptional features of Zuma's situation, which meant that his contempt presented a particularly severe threat to judicial integrity and the rule of law. In this regard, Khampepe considered both Zuma's unique political influence as a former president and the "intensity" of his "attacks on the Judiciary", which she described as "part of a deliberate and calculated strategy to undermine this Court's authority". Khampepe therefore held that a punitive sentence was necessary to send "an unequivocal message that [the court's] orders must be obeyed".

In terms of the majority's order, Zuma was instructed to submit himself to the South African Police Service within five calendar days, failing which the Minister of Police and National Police Commissioner would have three calendar days to ensure his delivery to a correctional centre. The majority also imposed punitive costs.

=== Minority judgment ===
In a dissenting judgment, Justice Leona Theron argued against imposing an unsuspended prison sentence. Indeed, she held that it was unconstitutional to impose unsuspended committal as a punitive sanction in the context of civil proceedings, where the respondent was not guaranteed the fair trial protections he would be granted in criminal proceedings. Applying a rights balancing exercise under section 36 of the Constitution, she held that the exceptional facts of Zuma's case did not justify limiting his constitutional rights in this manner, especially because the court's purpose – vindicating the rule of law – could be achieved by less restrictive means were Zuma subjected to criminal prosecution or were his prison sentence made conditional on his compliance with the Zuma I order. Theron concluded that Khampepe's judgment had unjustifiably "pushed the bounds of our law of contempt in order to meet these exceptional circumstances". Justice Chris Jafta concurred in her judgment.

=== Reception and aftermath ===
The judgment received international attention when it was handed down on 29 June 2021. It was welcomed by South African legal commentators including Pierre de Vos, Richard Calland, and Eusebius McKaiser, each of whom congratulated the majority on recognising the severity of the impending threat to the rule of law. However, other commentators agreed with the minority that Zuma's fair trial rights were unjustly ignored by the majority. The Jacob Zuma Foundation said in a statement that the judgment violated the principle of equality before the law.

Zuma did not hand himself in to police by the court-mandated deadline of 4 July, but he did so on 7 July, 40 minutes before the police's midnight deadline to effect his arrest. He was taken to the correctional centre in Estcourt, KwaZulu-Natal. On 9 July, the Pietermaritzburg High Court dismissed Zuma's application to have the arrest overturned, citing a lack of evidence for the medical grounds his lawyers raised. On the same day, there was a severe outbreak of civil unrest in KwaZulu-Natal, which observers linked to Zuma's detention. Commentator Moeletsi Mbeki questioned whether it was "worth it" to uphold the rule of law, a Western construct, at the cost of the civil unrest and concomitant economic and social damage.

== Zuma III: Rescission application ==
Zuma v State Capture Inquiry
- Court: Constitutional Court of South Africa
- Full case name: Jacob Gedleyihlekisa Zuma v Secretary of the Judicial Commission of Inquiry into Allegations of State Capture, Corruption and Fraud in the Public Sector Including Organs of State and Others
- Decided: 17 September 2021
- Docket nos.: CCT 52/21
- Citations: [2021] ZACC 28; 2021 (11) BCLR 1263 (CC)

Court membership
- Judges sitting: Khampepe J, Jafta J, Madlanga J, Majiedt J, Mhlantla J, Theron J, Tshiqi J, Pillay AJ and Tlaletsi AJ

Case opinions
- There were no rescindable errors or omissions in the Zuma II judgment.
- Decision by: Khampepe J (Madlanga, Majiedt, Mhlantla, Pillay, Tlaletsi and Tshiqi concurring)
- Dissent: Jafta J (Theron concurring); Theron J

Keywords
- Direct access; finality; functus officio; legal certainty; peremption; rescission; res judicata; rule 42 of the Uniform Rules of Court

=== Application ===
On 2 July 2021, before submitting to arrest the following week and while pursuing related legal action in the High Court, Zuma filed an application in the Constitutional Court seeking the rescission of the Zuma II order. Although the doctrine of finality means that Constitutional Court decisions are immune from ordinary appeal, Zuma sought to trigger the provision that allows the Constitutional Court to rescind its own judgments in a narrow range of circumstances. In court papers, Zuma argued, inter alia, that he had medical problems requiring "constant and intense therapy and attention", meaning that "In the present circumstances, it is the right to life itself which may be at stake. It is therefore no exaggeration to label mine as cruel and unusual punishment". He said that his "only sin" was seeking to postpone his testimony at the Zondo Commission until after the dispute over his application for Zondo's refusal was resolved; he had not intended to provoke "such acerbic judicial ire" as the Constitutional Court had shown in Zuma II. Commentators suggested that the application was "an elaborate exercise in gaslighting", "an appeal masquerading as a rescission application", or "a political stunt rather than a seriously intended legal challenge". However, the Constitutional Court agreed to hear the application.

Zuma v Secretary of the Judicial Commission of Inquiry into Allegations of State Capture, Corruption and Fraud in the Public Sector Including Organs of State and Others (Zuma III) was heard in the Constitutional Court on 12 July, and Zuma was represented in the court for the first time since the beginning of the saga – Dali Mpofu served as his counsel, while Tembeka Ngcukaitobi continued to represent the secretary of the Zondo Commission, the first respondent, and now also the commission's chairperson, Zondo, whom Zuma cited as second respondent. The other respondents were the Minister of Police, who was bound by the Zuma II order; the Minister of Justice and Correctional Services; and the Helen Suzman Foundation, which was amicus curiae in Zuma II. Two non-profit organisations, the Council for the Advancement of the South African Constitution and Democracy in Action, were newly admitted as amici curiae in the rescission matter.

Judgment was handed down on 17 September 2021, by which time the matter was practically moot because Correctional Services Commissioner Arthur Fraser had granted Zuma medical parole.

=== Majority judgment ===
The coram that heard Zuma III was identical to that which heard Zuma II, and it split along the same lines, though the court was unanimous in granting Zuma direct access. On behalf of the seven-judge majority, Justice Khampepe dismissed Zuma's rescission application with costs, finding that it did not meet the statutory and common law requirements for rescission in terms of rule 42 of the Uniform Rules of Court. According to Khampepe, the interests of justice and the rule of law demanded that only wholly exceptional circumstances sufficed to justify a departure from the doctrines of res judicata and functus officio, or else the administration of justice would be compromised by "chaos". Zuma's case did not meet this threshold.

Moreover, the majority criticised Zuma for his "litigious vacillation" on the issue of whether he wished to be represented during the Constitutional Court's proceedings. The amici curiae argued that Zuma preempted his right to bring the rescission application through his earlier conduct, which was clearly intended to indicate his lack of interest in the proceedings and their outcome; Khampepe expressed "reservations about extending the application of the doctrine of peremption to the present circumstances", but observed that "the underlying principles of peremption do resonate" in Zuma's case.

=== Minority judgments ===
Justices Theron and Jafta comprised the two-member minority of the court, as they had in the Zuma II decision. Jafta wrote that the majority judgment in Zuma II was unconstitutional and did not comply with international law, particularly with Articles 9 and 14 of the International Covenant on Civil and Political Rights attached to the International Bill of Rights; he argued that in sentencing Zuma without the option of an appeal, the Constitutional Court had denied Zuma a fair trial. Jafta therefore held that, because the Zuma II order was made by a procedure that was inconsistent with the Constitution, it should be set aside.

Theron concurred in Jafta judgment but also wrote a separate dissent on the minority's grounds for intervention, arguing that the Constitutional Court can reconsider its orders whenever it faces "exceptional circumstances" in which "the interests of justice 'cry out' for intervention". In particular, the Zuma II order "resulted in Mr Zuma’s incarceration without affording him a right of appeal. This is an unprecedented state of affairs and to uphold the order, which is fruit of the poisoned tree, would result in substantial hardship and injustice to Mr Zuma." In Theron's view, no further grounds of intervention were required to justify setting aside the order.

=== Reception ===
Through its spokesperson Mzwanele Manyi, the Jacob Zuma Foundation said that the majority's judgment was unjust, amounted to "bullying against the former president", and implied that "the rights of the human being, in this case president Zuma, were less important that the court protecting its own dignity through upholding a wrong judgment of imprisoning the former president without a trial being afforded to him." Pierre de Vos, on the other hand, was highly critical of the minority judgment. Accusing Jafta and Theron of "judicial decadence", he wrote in the Daily Maverick that:

[the Zuma II dissent's] main point – that there may, in most instances, be constitutional problems with sending a contemnor to prison using motion proceedings instead of a criminal trial – is one over which reasonable people could easily differ, and with which I have some sympathy. Our jurisprudence was enriched by having the benefit of the dissenting judgment in the original case – despite a few odd, politically incendiary phrases making their way into the judgment.

I fear the same cannot be said for the judgment of the dissenters in the rescission matter. The judgment is a bit of a mess: reading it is like watching a snake swallow its own tail. This is because it treats a rescission application as an appeal, and tries to re-argue the original case in which the dissenters lost the argument, but claims that it is doing no such thing.

== See also ==
- Stalingrad legal defense
- Jacob Zuma corruption charges – separate, contemporaneous legal charges against Zuma
