= List of Commissions of Inquiry in South Africa =

This is a list of Commissions of Inquiry established in South Africa since the end of Apartheid. A Commission of Inquiry, or more formally a Judicial Commission of Inquiry, is a public inquiry which has been established by either the President of South Africa or a Premier of one of the nine provinces of South Africa. Inquiries are generally established under two pieces of legislation, either the Commissions Act, 1947, or the Constitution of the Republic of South Africa, although they have also been established under other legislation too, such as the Promotion of National Unity and Reconciliation Act and the National Prosecuting Authority Act etc.

Section 4 of the Commissions Act, 1947 states "All the evidence and addresses heard by a commission shall be heard in public...". Section 3(3) of the act states "If required to do so by the chairman of a commission a witness shall, before giving evidence, take an oath or make an affirmation, which oath or affirmation shall be administered by the chairman of the commission or such official of the commission as the chairman may designate". No person appearing before the Commission may refuse to answer any question on any grounds other than those contemplated in section 3(4) of the Commissions Act, 1947.

The Constitution of the Republic of South Africa states:

- The President is responsible for appointing commissions of inquiry - Section 84(2)(f)
- The Premier of a province is responsible for appointing commissions of inquiry - Section 74(5)(a)
- A province may investigate, or appoint a commission of inquiry into, any complaints of police inefficiency or a breakdown in relations between the police and any community; and must make recommendations to the Cabinet member responsible for policing - Section 206(5)

Inquiry name	Enabling legislation	Reason for inquiry	Chair	Announcement date
Mokgoro Commission	National Prosecuting Authority Act (32 of 1998); Section 12(6)(a)	Enquiry into fitness of Advocate Nomgcobo Jiba and Advocate Lawrence Sithembiso Mrwebi to hold the office	Yvonne Mokgoro	9 November 2018
PIC Commission	Constitution of the Republic of South Africa, 1996 Section 84(2)(f)	Inquiry into allegations for impropriety regarding Public Investment Corporation	Lex Mpati	17 October 2018
Nugent Commission	Constitution of the Republic of South Africa, 1996 Section 84(2)(f)	Inquiry into Tax Administration and Governance by SARS	Robert Nugent	23 May 2018
Zondo Commission (aka State Capture Commission)	Commissions Act 1947 (8 of 1947); Section 1	Inquiry into allegations of state capture, corruption and fraud in the Public Sector including organs of State	Raymond Zondo	8 February 2018
Fees Commission	Constitution of the Republic of South Africa, 1996 Section 84(2)(f)	Inquiry into Higher Education and Training	John Heher	14 January 2016
Cassim Inquiry	National Prosecuting Authority Act (32 of 1998); Section 12(6)(a)	Inquiry into the National Director of Public Prosecutions’ fitness to hold office.	Nazeer Ahmed Cassim	5 February 2015
Marikana Commission	Constitution of the Republic of South Africa, 1996 Section 84(2)(f)	Enquiry into tragic incident at or near area commonly known as Marikana Mine in Rustenburg, North West Province	Ian Farlam	23 August 2012
Khayelitsha Commission of Inquiry	Constitution of the Republic of South Africa, 1996 Section 206(5)	To investigate allegations of police inefficiency in Khayelitsha and the breakdown in relations between the community and the police	Kate O'Regan	August 2012
Seriti Commission (aka Arms Procurement Commission)	Constitution of the Republic of South Africa, 1996 Section 84(2)(f)	Inquiry into allegations of fraud, corruption, impropriety or irregularity in the Strategic Defence Procurement Packages	Willie Seriti	24 October 2011
Ginwala Enquiry	National Prosecuting Authority Act 32 of 1998; Section 12(6)(a)	Enquiry into the fitness of Advocate Vusumuzi Pikoli to hold the office of National Director of Public Prosecutions	Frene Noshir Ginwala	4 October 2007
Khampepe Commission	Constitution of the Republic of South Africa, 1996 Section 84(2)(f)	To investigate the Scorpions and recommend on whether they should be merged into the South African Police Service.	Sisi Khampepe	1 April 2005
Hefer Commission	Commissions Act, 8 of 1947; Section 1	Inquiry into Allegations of Spying Against the National Director of Public Prosecutions, Mr Bulelani Thandabantu Ngcuka	Joos Hefer	19 September 2003
Donen Commission	Commissions Act, 8 of 1947; Section 1	Inquiry into the Alleged Illicit Activities of Certain South African Companies or Individuals Relating to the United Nations Oil-for-Food Programme in Iraq	Michael Donen	13 February 2002
Myburgh Commission	Commissions Act, 8 of 1947; Section 1	Inquiry into the Rapid Devaluation of the External Value of the Rand	John Myburgh	30 January 2002
Ngobeni Commission of Inquiry	Constitution of the Republic of South Africa, 1996 Section 84(2)(f) and Commissions Act	Inquiry Into the Fire at the Pretoriuskop Area In The Kruger National Park That Broke Out on 4 September 2001	David Dlamafa Ngobeni	21 December 2001
Jali Commission	Constitution of the Republic of South Africa, 1996 Section 84(2) and Commissions Act	Inquiry into alleged incidents of corruption, maladministration, violence or intimidation in Department of Correctional Services	Thabani Jali	3 December 2001
Inquiry into human rights violations in farming communities	Human Rights Commission Act, 54 of 1994. Section 9(6)	Inquiry into incidence of human rights violations within farming communities and for holding a public inquiry.	Jody Kollapen	11 June 2001
Ngoepe Commission	Commissions Act, 8 of 1947; Section 1	Inquiry into the 11 April 2001 Ellis Park disaster	B M Ngoepe	20 April 2001
Nel Commission	not known	Inquiry into the Affairs of the Masterbond Group and Investor Protection in South Africa.	H C Nel	April 2001
Truth and Reconciliation Commission	Promotion of National Unity and Reconciliation Act, 34 of 1995	The commission invited witnesses of gross human rights violations to give statements about their experiences, and selected some for public hearings.	Desmond Tutu	December 1995

== See also ==
- List of committees of the Parliament of South Africa
