= Sisi Khampepe =

South African Constitutional Court judge

Justice of the Constitutional Court
- In office 12 October 2009 – 11 October 2021
- Appointed by: Jacob Zuma

Judge of the Labour Appeal Court
- In office November 2007 – 11 October 2009
- Appointed by: Thabo Mbeki

Judge of the High Court
- In office 1 December 2000 – 11 October 2009
- Appointed by: Thabo Mbeki
- Division: Transvaal Provincial Division

Personal details
- Born: 8 January 1957 (age 69) Soweto, Transvaal; Union of South Africa
- Spouse: Siza Khampepe
- Education: University of Zululand; Harvard Law School

Sisi Virginia Khampepe (born 8 January 1957) is a retired South African judge who served in the Constitutional Court of South Africa between October 2009 and October 2021. Formerly a prominent labour lawyer, she joined the bench in December 2000 as a judge of the Transvaal Provincial Division. She was also a member of the Truth and Reconciliation Commission.

Born in Soweto, Khampepe entered legal practice as a fellow of the Legal Resources Centre before she gained admission as an attorney in 1985. For a decade thereafter, she ran her own firm in Johannesburg, primarily representing employees and trade unions in labour law matters. Between 1995 and 1998, she served at the appointment of President Nelson Mandela as a member of the post-apartheid Truth and Reconciliation Commission, and from 1998 to 1999 she was a director in the National Prosecuting Authority.

In December 2000, President Thabo Mbeki appointed her as a judge of the High Court of South Africa, and he additionally appointed her to the Labour Appeal Court in November 2007. During this time, Khampepe chaired the high-profile Khampepe Commission which advised against the disbanding of the Scorpions. After President Jacob Zuma elevated her to the Constitutional Court in October 2009, she served a full 12-year term in the apex court. Her best-known judgment was Judicial Commission of Inquiry into Allegations of State Capture v Zuma, in which she sentenced former President Zuma to imprisonment for contempt of court.

== Early life and education ==
Khampepe was born on 8 January 1957 in the township of Soweto, where she grew up. The youngest of three sisters, she was born into a Zulu family. She attended Mosepele Primary School in Soweto and matriculated in 1975 at Dlwangezwa High School in Natal Province.

During her childhood, Khampepe's mother, a domestic worker, often left her in the care of her uncle, until he was arrested for contravening pass laws and forced to return to Natal, where he was stabbed to death; Khampepe's mother blamed the apartheid law for his death. Also formative for Khampepe's interest in the legal profession was her involvement in competitive debating in high school. One of her coaches told her that she reminded him of politician Helen Suzman and that, if she went to university, she should study law as Suzman had.

After matriculating, she studied law at the University of Zululand in Empangeni, where she completed a BProc in 1980 and where she was, in her own words, "always one of the top in my class". During her vacations as a student in 1979 and 1980, she worked as a legal adviser at the Industrial Aid Society, which advocated for the labour rights of black workers. After graduation, she accepted a fellowship at the Legal Resources Centre, which lasted between 1981 and 1983. During that period, one of her former professors encouraged her to apply for a postgraduate scholarship, and she ultimately moved to Massachusetts to attend Harvard Law School, completing an LLM in 1982.

== Legal career ==
=== Practice as an attorney ===
Upon her return to South Africa, Khampepe struggled to find a placement for her articles of clerkship at any of the few firms that would allow her to practice labour law. With the assistance of her teenage inspiration, Helen Suzman, and the Legal Resources Centre's Felicia Kentridge, she was ultimately recruited as a candidate attorney at Bowman Gilfillan, where she served her articles from 1983. She later said that the firm's clients were resistant to being represented in litigation by a young black woman.

After she was admitted as an attorney in the Transvaal in 1985, Khampepe established her own firm, SV Khampepe Attorneys, of which she remained the sole director for the next decade. Her clients included hawkers, civic organisations, black consumer unions (including the National Black Consumer Union from 1985 to 1986), and the Orlando Pirates Football Club. However, she specialised in labour law, later describing herself as having been "a labour lawyer at heart, through and through". Her firm frequently defended workers against unfair employment practices, and it also represented various trade unions affiliated to the progressive National Council of Trade Unions and Congress of South African Trade Unions. As national legal advisor to the South African Commercial, Catering and Allied Workers Union, she was a trustee of the union's investment trust when it was established in the 1990s; and from 1990 to 1995, she was the administrator of the trade unions' fund of the international Federation international des employés. She was also a member of the Black Lawyers' Association throughout her legal career, and, in Soweto, she was a facilitator of the local street committee.

=== Truth and Reconciliation Commission ===
On 15 December 1995, Khampepe was among the 17 individuals appointed by President Nelson Mandela to the post-apartheid Truth and Reconciliation Commission, chaired by Archbishop Desmond Tutu. She served in the commission's Amnesty Committee, which heard applications for grants of amnesty to those who had committed politically motivated human rights violations. There she worked closely with Bernard Ngoepe, another commissioner and a judge, who became a mentor to her and ultimately influenced her decision to join the judiciary.

=== National Prosecuting Authority ===
Upon the conclusion of the commission's work, in September 1998, Khampepe was appointed to the newly established National Prosecuting Authority as Deputy National Director of Public Prosecutions under Bulelani Ngcuka. She held that position until December 1999.

== Gauteng High Court: 2000–2009 ==
On 31 October 2000, President Thabo Mbeki announced that Khampepe would join the bench as a judge of the Transvaal Provincial Division of the High Court of South Africa (later the North Gauteng Division), then led by her mentor, Bernard Ngoepe. She took office on 1 December 2000. She later moved to sit in Johannesburg in the Witwatersrand Local Division (later the South Gauteng Division).

During her High Court Service, Khampepe was appointed as the vice-chairperson of the National Council for Correctional Services in 2005 (a position she held until 2010), and Donald McKinnon of the Commonwealth of Nations seconded her as a member of the Commonwealth Observer Group to the 2006 Ugandan general election. In addition, President Mbeki appointed her to two high-profile government panels in South Africa.

=== Khampepe Report ===
In 2002, President Mbeki appointed Khampepe and Judge Dikgang Moseneke to lead a judicial observer mission to the 2002 Zimbabwean presidential election, the outcome of which was disputed due to claims of vote-rigging by Robert Mugabe's ZANU–PF. Khampepe and Moseneke's report, the so-called Khampepe Report, was not published; instead, Mbeki relied on a favourable report from another mission, the larger South African Observer Mission, in endorsing Mugabe's re-election as valid. The Mail & Guardian subsequently launched a prolonged campaign to gain access to the Khampepe Report, lodging a request in terms of the Promotion of Access to Information Act and fighting governmental appeals, under three successive South African presidents, in three courts. The report was finally made public in November 2014, and it transpired that Khampepe and Moseneke had advised Mbeki that the 2002 election was not free or fair.

=== Khampepe Commission ===
In March 2005, President Mbeki appointed Khampepe to lead a one-person commission of inquiry into the future of the Directorate of Special Operations, the specialised anti-corruption unit better known as the Scorpions. She was tasked with investigating the mandate of the Scorpions, its relationship with other law enforcement agencies, and its location under the National Prosecuting Authority. The appointment was viewed as a "hot political potato", given that the Scorpions had conducted several high-profile investigations into sitting politicians. The Khampepe Commission conducted its work between April 2005 and February 2006, but Khampepe's report was not released to the public until May 2008.

Her report was broadly supportive of the Scorpions, concluding that it fulfilled a valuable mandate and recommending that it should continue to exist as a unit of the National Prosecuting Authority, though under the political oversight of the Minister of Safety and Security rather than the Minister of Justice. However, by the time the report was released, Mbeki's political party, the African National Congress (ANC), had already initiated legislation to disband the Scorpions entirely. Nonetheless, observers said that Khampepe's "principled line" and "politically incorrect defence of the unit's prosecutorial independence" cemented her public profile and her reputation as a judge.

=== Labour Appeal Court ===
On 19 November 2007, President Mbeki appointed Khampepe as a judge of the specialised Labour Appeal Court of South Africa. She took office later the same month, alongside Judges Dennis Davis and Monica Leeuw. She was nominated to the court by its acting Judge President, Ronnie Bosielo, and was its only woman judge at the time of her appointment. During her two years there, she served a stint as acting Deputy Judge President.

== Constitutional Court: 2009–2021 ==
=== Nomination ===
In August 2009, Khampepe was among the 24 candidates whom the Judicial Service Commission shortlisted for possible appointment to four vacancies on the Constitutional Court of South Africa, arising from the respective resignations of Justices Pius Langa, Yvonne Mokgoro, Kate O’Regan, and Albie Sachs. Khampepe was regarded as one of the frontrunners, both because she was respected as a judge and because of her "perceived closeness" to Justice Sandile Ngcobo, who was earmarked for appointment as Chief Justice of South Africa. She was interviewed by the Judicial Service Commission on 21 September in Kliptown, Soweto, and the panel asked her primarily about her experience as the head of the Khampepe Commission and her treatment of political stakeholders in that process. The Mail & Guardian viewed these questions as indicative of the Judicial Service Commission's "soft handling" of Khampepe.

The following day, upon the conclusion of its interviews, the Judicial Service Commission endorsed Khampepe and six other candidates as suitable for appointment. Anonymous sources told News24 that Khampepe had the unanimous support of the commission's members, including Justice Minister Jeff Radebe and outgoing Chief Justice Pius Langa, less because of her jurisprudence than because of "her wide experience and her ability to apply her mind". On 11 October 2009, President Jacob Zuma announced that he had appointed Khampepe and three others – Johan Froneman, Chris Jafta, and Mogoeng Mogoeng – to the Constitutional Court bench, with effect from the following day.

=== Judicial leadership ===
Justice Edwin Cameron later characterised Khampepe as "perhaps the second most powerful person in this Court after the Chief Justice", and in 2011, as Ngcobo's retirement approached, she was regarded as one of the frontrunners in the race to succeed him as Chief Justice, especially given rumours that Ngcobo himself supported her elevation. Although Deputy Chief Justice Dikgang Moseneke was considered to be the overall favourite, commentators believed that Khampepe would be the foremost candidate if President Zuma elected to appoint a woman; according to Eusebius McKaiser, she was "more politically acceptable to the ANC than other options". Over the objections of civil society groups, both Moseneke and Khampepe were ultimately overlooked in favour of Justice Mogoeng Mogoeng. However, there were reports that Zuma had offered the position to Khampepe ahead of Moseneke, but that she had declined because she felt that Moseneke was better-qualified.

In later years, Zuma's successor, President Cyril Ramaphosa, twice appointed Khampepe to fill in for Mogoeng as Acting Chief Justice, once in 2019 and once in 2021; on both occasions, she assumed Mogoeng's office through appointment as Acting Deputy Chief Justice in place of Raymond Zondo, who at the time was presiding over his commission of inquiry into state capture. She additionally served as the chairperson of the court's Artworks Committee from 2015 onwards, having joined the committee in 2012 as a birthday present to Justice Johann van der Westhuizen.

=== Jurisprudence ===
At the end of Khampepe's tenure in the Constitutional Court, Chief Justice Raymond Zondo singled out for commendation her jurisprudence "on the rights of women and children, and other vulnerable members of society". This included notably her judgment in Teddy Bear Clinic v Minister of Justice, handed down unanimously in 2013, which decriminalised consensual sexual acts between minor children and which was widely heralded as progressive. Likewise, in the labour law matter of Mankayi v AngloGold Ashanti, Khampepe wrote on behalf of the majority in finding that mineworkers with occupational lung disease were entitled to institute civil claims against their employers; this holding enabled an unprecedented flurry of class action litigation against South African mines.

Also welcomed was Khampepe's majority concurring judgment in Tshabalala v S; Ntuli v S, which contained various obiter remarks about the nature of rape in patriarchy; she characterised rape as fundamentally "an abuse of power expressed in a sexual way" and as "structural and systemic" rather than "unusual and deviant". Her minority judgment in AB v Minister of Social Development was described as a "tour de force infused with both reason and compassion" and based on an expansive conception of reproductive rights.

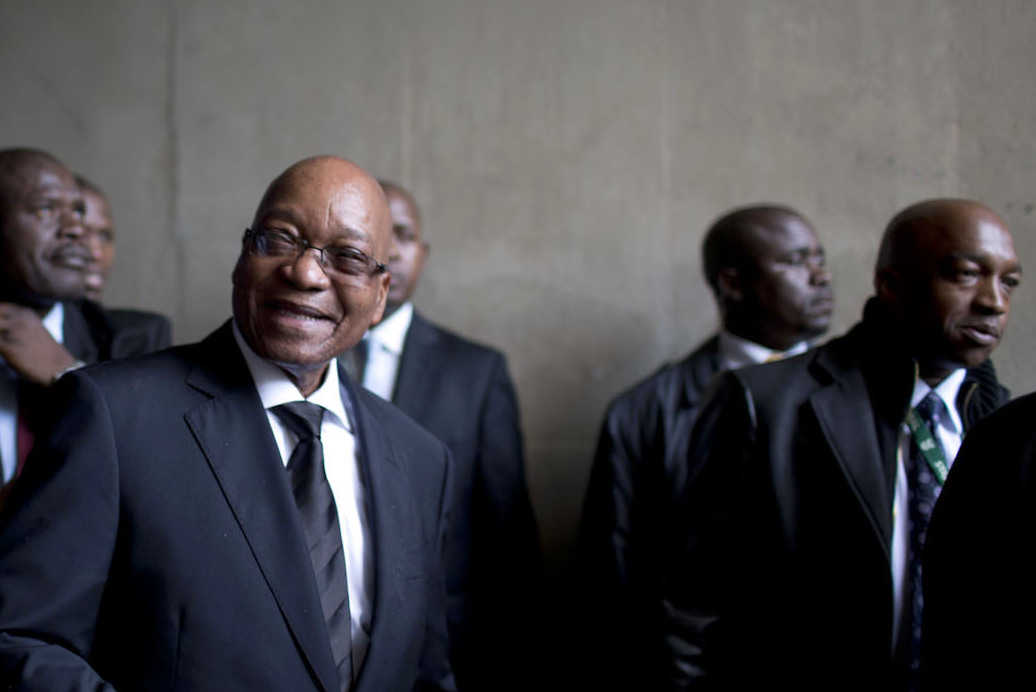
President Jacob Zuma, who appointed Khampepe to the apex court, was imprisoned as a result of her judgment in Zuma II.

==== Zuma judgments ====
Khampepe herself considered the highlight of her career to be her defence of the rule of law in Judicial Commission of Inquiry into Allegations of State Capture v Zuma (Zuma II), the June 2021 judgment in which Khampepe wrote for the court's majority in sentencing former President Zuma to 15 months' imprisonment for contempt of court. Khampepe, who was acting as Chief Justice at the time, wrote that Zuma had "left this court with no real choice" but to imprison him. The ruling was significant because it marked the first time that the Constitutional Court had imprisoned someone for contempt of court, but also because of its political sensitivity; Zuma's arrest the following week was followed by an outbreak of civil unrest. Khampepe later said that, though aware of the judgment's political significance, "I felt the same way that I feel when handing down any judgment... I had a sense of simply discharging my constitutional obligations". Asked about the Jacob Zuma Foundation's claim that the judgment was "emotional and angry", she said that she had expected "these misogynistic attacks".

Described by Ferial Haffajee as a "decisive defence of the rule of law" and by Pierre de Vos as a "forceful and eloquent defence of the judiciary", Khampepe's Zuma II judgment was viewed as momentous and was welcomed by civil society organisations including AfriForum, Corruption Watch, Freedom Under Law, and Frank Chikane's Defend Our Democracy campaign. Adriaan Basson said that the judgment was "proof of the supremacy of the Constitution and will have a chilling effect on generations of delinquent politicians", and Richard Calland said that "there could be no clearer or stronger sign of the independence of the judiciary" than the judgment. However, some commentators worried that the judgment neglected Zuma's right to a fair trial, an argument that was made sharply by Justice Leona Theron in her dissenting judgment.

In Zuma v Judicial Commission of Inquiry into Allegations of State Capture (Zuma III), a related judgment handed down three months later, Khampepe wrote on behalf of the same majority in dismissing Zuma's application for rescission of the Zuma II order. Though Zuma's spokesman, Mzwanele Manyi, called this judgment a "miscarriage of justice", it was commended for resisting Zuma's so-called Stalingrad tactics; quoting approvingly from Khampepe's opening paragraph, which stated that, "Like all things in life, like the best of times and the worst of times, litigation must, at some point, come to an end", Mpumelelo Mkhabela suggested that the doctrine of legal finality should be renamed the Khampepe Doctrine in her honour.

== Retirement ==
Khampepe retired from the judiciary on 11 October 2021, at the end of her non-renewable 12-year term in the Constitutional Court.

=== Higher education ===
In May 2022, Khampepe was appointed to succeed Wiseman Nkuhlu as the Chancellor of the University of Pretoria; she began her renewable five-year term on 28 June 2022.

The following month, the University of Stellenbosch appointed her to conduct an independent inquiry into allegations of racism at the institution, which had proliferated in the wake of a video of a student urinating on a black student's belongings in the Huis Marais residence. Her findings, published in November 2022, pointed to "a very toxic culture" at Huis Marais, which she recommended should be addressed through various governance reforms. She also recommended a review of the university's language policy, observing an enduring "cultural preference" for the use of Afrikaans, which she said caused linguistic exclusion and racial division. This recommendation attracted the ire of AfriForum and of the opposition Democratic Alliance (DA), which said it would seek judicial review of the report; DA politician Leon Schreiber accused Khampepe of "equating Afrikaans with racism".

In November 2022, Khampepe was appointed to an independent panel at the University of Cape Town, which, under the chairmanship of retired Judge of Appeal Lex Mpati, was tasked with investigating allegations of governance failures at the university, including alleged gross misconduct by controversial vice-chancellor Mamokgethi Phakeng.

=== Other activities ===
In September 2023, Panyaza Lesufi, the Premier of Gauteng, appointed Khampepe to chair a three-member commission of inquiry into a recent deadly fire in an illegally occupied government building in Marshalltown, Johannesburg. During the commission's proceedings, Khampepe recused a co-commissioner, Thulani Makhubela, saying that his involvement would create an appearance of bias because he had previously used his Twitter account to voice support for xenophobic organisations, including Operation Dudula. Dudula objected strongly, accusing Khampepe of "cheap politicking" and calling for her own removal from the commission.

In November 2020, Danny Jordaan announced that Khampepe would be appointed to chair the newly established ethics committee of the South African Football Association (Safa). In that capacity, she was called on to investigate various allegations of corruption in Safa.

== Personal life ==
She is married to businessman Siza Khampepe, with whom she has two children, a son and a daughter, both born before she joined the bench. Her husband was a director of a firm, Kgorong Investment Holdings, which received a subcontract in the controversial Arms Deal; reports in this connection caused a minor stir during the Khampepe Commission, because the Scorpions had investigated and prosecuted corruption in the Arms Deal. In June 2012, she was the victim of an armed robbery at her family home in Randburg.
