= Mzwanele Manyi =

South African politician and businessman (born 1964)

Mzwanele Manyi MP
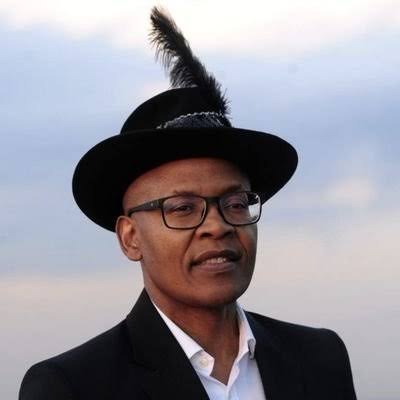
- Manyi at a birthday soiree in 2017

Member of the National Assembly of South Africa
- In office 7 June 2023 – Current

Chief Executive Officer (CEO) of the Government Communication and Information System
- In office February 2011 – August 2012
- President: Jacob Zuma
- Preceded by: Themba Maseko
- Succeeded by: Phumla Williams

Director-General of the Department of Labour
- In office May 2009 – February 2011
- President: Jacob Zuma
- Preceded by: Vanguard Mkosana

Personal details
- Born: Jimmy Mzwanele Manyi; 20 January 1964 (age 62) Meadowlands, Soweto; Transvaal, South Africa
- Party: uMkhonto weSizwe Party (since 2024)
- Other political affiliations: Economic Freedom Fighters (2023–2024); African Transformation Movement (2019–2023); African National Congress (until 2019)

Mzwanele Manyi (born Jimmy Mzwanele Manyi 20 January 1964) is a South African businessman, politician, and former government spokesperson. He serves as a member of the National Assembly of South Africa. Manyi previously was chief executive officer of the Government Communication and Information System (GCIS) before acquiring The New Age newspaper and the ANN7 news channel. He was elected to the National Assembly in 2023 as a member of the Economic Freedom Fighters (EFF).

Active in the African National Congress (ANC) and later the EFF, Manyi has been a prominent figure in South Africa's political landscape.

== Early career ==
Manyi was a geologist by profession before starting his political career.

In July 2005, Manyi was named for the second Commission on Employment Equity (CEE) by Minister of Labour Membathisi Mdladlana. In September 2007, as chairperson of the CEE, he proposed to Parliament that employment equity legislation be amended to exclude white women from benefiting from affirmative action, a suggestion that generated significant public debate. Manyi compared South African companies to Irish coffee, stating: "There is the white part on top and a mass of black at the bottom, with a sprinkling of black right on top... We can conclude that the management of the economy is still being controlled by whites."

Manyi also was a member of the Black Management Forum (BMF), and its president. South African journalist Mandy Rossouw stated in 2011 that Manyi transformed the BMF, "from a garden-variety pro-transformation organisation to one that every television-watching South African knows about". He was a strong proponent of the government's early Black Economic Empowerment (BEE) policies.

== Labour Director-General (2009–2011) ==
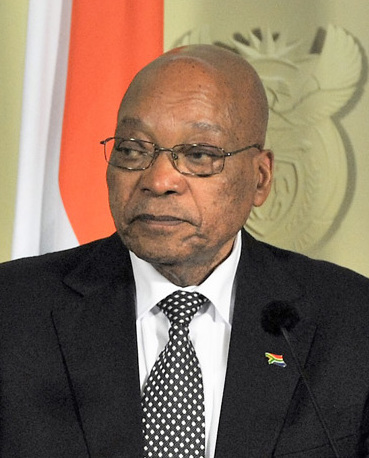
Manyi entered government as an ally and appointee of President Jacob Zuma.

In August 2009, President Jacob Zuma appointed Manyi as Director-General in the Department of Labour, then under the political leadership of Minister Membathisi Mdladlana. In the weeks following his appointment, Manyi stated that he would remain an advocate for employment equity, pledging to "with the greatest of passion" enforce compliance with BEE requirements and end what he described as the prevailing "nicey, nicey, nicey" attitude towards non-compliant companies.

=== Re-election to the BMF: October 2009 ===
While Director-General, Manyi remained in office as president of the BMF. Reports indicated that some members of the BMF were dissatisfied with his leadership, particularly those who believed that the organisation's non-partisan stance was incompatible with his support for the governing African National Congress (ANC). Earlier that year, Manyi had publicly endorsed the ANC ahead of the general election. He dismissed concerns about his proximity to the governing party, stating, "We want the government to give the forum a call before they move [on policy] and say 'How must we do this?' We want to influence policy. It is not the forum's job to criticise the government; we've got the DA to do that".

At the BMF's annual general meeting in Midrand in October 2009, the other leadership contender—outgoing deputy president and Shell SA executive Bonang Mohale—withdrew from the contest, resulting in Manyi's re-election for a second three-year term. Following his re-election, Manyi announced that his new deputy, Thembakazi Mnyaka, would "carry the can" for the BMF and become its public face, while he would "play a supporting role". Nevertheless, he continued to be a prominent figure within the organisation. In 2010, he played a key role in the BMF's involvement in leadership elections at major South African trade association Business Unity South Africa (BUSA), where the BMF supported Sandile Zungu over the eventual winner, Futhi Mtoba. The BMF subsequently described Mtoba's election as "a blow against transformation".

In May 2010, The Sunday Independent reported that Minister of Labor Membathisi Mdladlana had given Manyi an ultimatum to choose between his government position and his role in the BMF, a claim Mdladlana later denied. Manyi argued there was no reason for him to step down from the BMF, as he already held the position when he was appointed Director-General. In September 2010, three former BMF presidents called for his removal, citing his closeness to government and the ANC, as well as what they described as his "frightening brand of arrogance, amateurism and lack of logic". The BMF's annual general meeting declined to remove him but appointed a panel to review his fitness for office.

=== Constitutional change remarks: April 2010 ===
In April 2010, at a BMF symposium attended by President Zuma, Manyi argued that the South African Constitution "does not support the transformation agenda in this country". He cited, among others, the property rights clause, which he said made land expropriation prohibitively expensive, hindering land reform, and the clause guaranteeing freedom of expression, which he suggested the media had "taken a tad too far". Referring to criticism of the presidency, he asked, "Why is it that media can have a field day with impunity, railroading the office of the president. Why is it so easy?". The Sunday Times editorial described his remarks as "baffling" and "unfortunate".

=== Norwegian complaint: June 2010 ===
In March 2010, Manyi met in Pretoria with Norwegian diplomats, including Ambassador Tor Christian Hildan, to discuss Norway's involvement in South African job-creation initiatives. According to reports, the discussion became tense when BEE policies were raised.

The Norwegian ambassador subsequently lodged a complaint with the South African government, first approaching Minister Mdladlana and later escalating the matter to Minister of International Relations and Cooperation Maite Nkoana-Mashabane after receiving no initial response. According to the Mail & Guardian the complaint expressed concern about Manyi's conduct and his perceived "political clout".

Manyi stated that the discussion on BEE arose naturally in the meeting and that he offered to provide a presentation to clarify the policy's objectives. However, unconfirmed reports alleged that he had sought to steer Norwegian involvement towards partnerships with black South African businessmen rather than the government, raising concerns about a conflict of interest given his role as BMF president. The Democratic Alliance (DA) cited this as evidence of such a conflict.

In 2011, after Manyi had left the Department of Labour, Public Protector Thuli Madonsela released a report titled To be or not to be in conflict, which concluded that he had failed to disclose and manage a conflict of interest between his government role and his BMF presidency. The report stated that he had offered the Norwegian delegation paid BMF training on BEE, which could be seen as an inappropriate use of his government position to benefit a private organisation. Manyi maintained that the offer was pro bono and that the ambassador had misunderstood his intentions.

=== Suspension: June 2010 ===
In June 2010, the Ministry of Labour placed Manyi on precautionary suspension without providing specific reasons, prompting speculation in the media. Some reports linked the suspension to the Norwegian diplomatic incident. During the same period, The Sunday Times published allegations from multinational accounting company KPMG of "massive fraud and corruption" within the Department of Labour, which Minister Mdladlana denied, stating the suspension was unrelated.

Manyi did not return to his position as Director-General and was not subjected to formal disciplinary proceedings. In February 2011, he was transferred to the role of chief executive officer at the Government Communication and Information System (GCIS). The Mail & Guardian speculated that, "Manyi seems to have fought his suspension and successfully negotiated being moved to an equally powerful position as top government spokesperson." Manyi later said that he had remained a salaried employee during his suspension. Nkosinathi Nhleko succeeded him as Director-General.

== Director-General of GCIS (2011–2012) ==
On 2 February 2011, Zuma announced that Manyi had been appointed, with immediate effect, as Director-General of the Government Communication and Information System (GCIS), a position in which he would also serve as the official spokesperson for the Cabinet. The appointment was unexpected, as the incumbent, Themba Maseko, was widely regarded for his competence. According to the Presidency, Maseko had been asked to transfer to the role of Director-General in the Department of Public Service and Administration.

When asked about the appointment, Minister in the Presidency Collins Chabane stated that he saw no conflict of interest arising from Manyi's role in the Black Management Forum (BMF) and described the Norwegian complaint against him as "neither here nor there for now". However, the Mail & Guardian questioned Manyi's suitability, citing his BMF presidency—in which capacity he also chaired the BMF's investment arm, the Black Management Forum Investment Company, which invested in regulated industries—as well as concerns that he might overshadow government communications by "becoming the story". In response, the African National Congress (ANC) accused the media of "demonising" Manyi before he had assumed his new role.

=== "Over-concentration of Coloureds" remarks: February 2011 ===
Less than a month after his appointment to the Government Communication and Information System (GCIS), Manyi faced a major controversy. In late February 2011, amid a wider political debate on proposed amendments to employment equity legislation, the trade union Solidarity released a video clip of comments he had made in March 2010 while serving as Director-General of Labour, during a televised interview on KykNet's Robinson Regstreeks.

In the interview, Manyi addressed concerns that uniform provincial employment equity targets could disadvantage Coloured South Africans, the majority of whom lived in the Western Cape and Northern Cape. He suggested that Coloured people could improve their employment opportunities by relocating to provinces where they were under-represented, as businesses there would be more likely to hire them to meet equity targets. In a widely circulated excerpt, he stated:

"I think it's very important for Coloured people in this country to understand that South Africa belongs to them in totality, not just the Western Cape. So this over-concentration of Coloureds in the Western Cape is not working for them. They should spread in the rest of the country... so they must stop this over-concentration situation because they are in over-supply where they are. You must look into the country and see where you can meet the supply."

==== Response ====
The comments drew strong criticism. The Freedom Front Plus and the South African Municipal Workers' Union called for his dismissal, while the Congress of South African Trade Unions (Cosatu) urged an investigation, saying the remarks "cast serious aspersions on his suitability for senior public office". The Democratic Alliance (DA) accused the government of pursuing "social engineering on a scale not seen since the darkest days of apartheid" and described the comments as "crude racism".

The DA also released a separate video from February 2010 in which Manyi remarked that "Indians have bargained their way to the top". While he said the statement about Indians was made "on a lighter note" and in jest, he defended the Coloureds comment as reflecting the position of the Black Management Forum (BMF) rather than his personal views:

This was the BMF position. I have no feelings on any issue. I speak as BMF chairman or as the government spokesman. This has nothing to do with me personally... Why is this being personalised?

GCIS deputy Vusi Mona later issued an apology on Manyi's behalf, stating that Manyi "wished to apologise unreservedly" to those offended. However, Mona also suggested that the issue had resurfaced as part of a "vendetta" against Manyi, aimed at undermining his recent appointment as government spokesperson.

The African National Congress (ANC) distanced itself from the "disturbing" remarks, saying they were inconsistent with the non-racial principles of the Freedom Charter, but rejected calls for his dismissal. Secretary-General Gwede Mantashe, described Manyi as "an agent of transformation" and said, "People who make calls to fire Jimmy Manyi have a hatred for change. Change is painful". Rossouw, writing in the Mail & Guardian, suggested that his close ties to President Jacob Zuma shielded him from political consequences.

==== Trevor Manuel's open letter ====
The saga became memorable partly because of the ferocious response of Trevor Manuel, a struggle stalwart then serving as a Minister in the Presidency, who published an open letter in the Mercury in which he accused Manyi of being "a racist in the mould of H. F. Verwoerd". Other ANC associates defended Manuel and expressed similar sentiments, with Zwelinzima Vavi of Cosatu agreeing that Manyi's remarks were "absolutely racist" and "a most unfortunate statement ever to be made in a democracy"; Kader Asmal released a statement which urged that, "Minister Manuel deserves the support and praise of all right-thinking South Africans. The choice facing us is very clear: do we stand behind the humane and generous values of Minister Manuel, or do we, by staying silent, lend our support to the mischievous and dangerous notions of Mr Manyi." Allan Boesak wrote his own ferocious open letter to Manyi in the Rapport, accusing Manyi of poisoning people's minds.

[Putatively over-concentrated Coloureds], which so irritate you, include many who made huge sacrifices in the struggle against apartheid, at a time when people with views like Jimmy Manyi were conspicuous by their absence from the misery of exile, the battles at the barricades and from apartheid's jails. By the way, what did YOU do in the war, Jimmy?
I want to put it to you that these statements would make you a racist in the mould of H. F. Verwoerd. I want to put it to you that you have the same mind that operated under apartheid, never merely satisfied with inflicting the hurt of forced removals and the Group Areas Act, would encamp language groups so that horrible aberrations, such as Soshanguve, were created to accommodate "non-Tswanas" in their own little encampments in greater Mabopane... I want to put it to you that your behaviour is of the worst-order racist...
I now know who Nelson Mandela was talking about when he said from the dock that he had fought against white domination and that he had fought against black domination.
Jimmy, he was talking about fighting against people like you.

— Trevor Manuel's open letter to Manyi, March 2011

However, the ANC Youth League professed itself "disturbed" by Manuel's letter, saying, "We now do not know who Trevor Manuel represents, because his remarks falls squarely into the political agenda of right-wing political forces opposed to the ANC". Manuel's letter also drew a response from Paul Ngobeni, who, writing in the Sunday Independent, called for Manuel to be fired. Ngobeni accused Manuel of being "a gangster of the worst kind", of acting as though he was "the king of Coloured people", and of seeking to undermine President Zuma and his cabinet through his "cowardly, unwarranted and racist attacks on Manyi". Ngobeni was subsequently suspended from his position as legal adviser to Defence Minister Lindiwe Sisulu, who distanced herself from his letter and "all its contents", though he returned to work in July.

When questioned about the saga two years later, Manyi said, "If such a honourable man such as Jesus Christ, who brought good news and salvation, was harmed very viciously on the cross, who am I?" He maintained that his remarks about Coloureds had been "grossly misrepresented" and said that the response of academics and analysts, who had criticised him in the media without taking the time to understand his view, had led him to "los[e] all respect for these so-called experts".

=== Retreat from the BMF: March 2011 ===
Later in March 2011, the BMF announced that, at Manyi's request, deputy president Tembakazi Mnyaka would take over most of Manyi's BMF responsibilities, including speaking for the organisation in public. The forum said that this would allow Manyi to concentrate on his new government responsibilities, as well as help prepare for a smooth leadership transition when Manyi's BMF term ended in October 2012.

However, the remainder of his term at BMF provided further minor controversies. The BMF once again became involved in Busa's governance: in mid-2011, Beeld reported that Manyi had arrived uninvited at a meeting of Busa management to insist that BMF should have a say in the appointment of Busa's new CEO, though Busa said that the meeting had been "fully procedural". In addition, in March the next year, GCIS staff complained to the Mail & Guardian that Manyi had hired several BMF associates to senior positions in the agency.

=== Vuk'unzenzele: March 2011 ===
In late March 2011, Manyi told City Press that the government would launch its own newspaper, a revamped version of the existing government magazine, Vuk'uzenzele, which was currently published every two months. Manyi said that the GCIS would publish the newspaper monthly from April and planned to ramp up to fortnightly publication within a year. With plans for print-run of between 1.7 million and two million copies, Vuk'unzenzele would have the largest circulation of any newspaper in the country, would be free to all residents, and would be published in all 11 official languages. Edited by a GCIS official, the newspaper would, according to Manyi, solve the problem whereby the government was forced to abdicate its public communication responsibilities to commercial editorial discretion. Manyi said, "The media is censoring a lot of government information. Niyasivusa ukuba sizenzele [Xhosa for "You are rousing us to do things ourselves"]." He further suggested that Vuk'unzenzele could become a daily newspaper if the commercial media continued to "censor" the government.

Manyi's announcement drew criticism from multiple quarters. Corné Mulder, leader of the opposition Freedom Front Plus, accused GCIS of abusing its power and infringing on media freedom by effectively threatening to publish ANC "party-political propaganda" using public funds. The South African National Editors' Forum (SANEF) was highly aggrieved by Manyi's accusation of censorship, with deputy chairperson Raymond Louw challenging Manyi to provide specific examples of censored information.

=== Advertising restructuring plan: June 2011 ===
In June 2011, weeks after announcing the Vuk'unzenzele initiative and still in his first six months in office, Manyi announced that cabinet had resolved to centralise all government media buying under GCIS. The implication was that GCIS would control the entirety of government's R1 billion advertising budget, hitherto dispersed across the different departments. Manyi said that centralisation would allow GCIS to "monitor and enforce adherence to the government brand" and to realise economies of scale, directing the advertising budget to media outlets where the government would get the most "bang for its buck". The same week, he announced that GCIS, "forced" to find alternative ways of communicating government's message, was planning to procure substantial television airtime for national government ministers to inform the public about their programmes.

Although they pointed out that government advertising was a relatively minor component of overall advertising revenues, news editors were furious with what SANEF described as an unconstitutional attempt to coerce the independent press into giving favourable coverage to the government, tantamount to "bribery" or economic sanctions. Manyi reversed the accusation of blackmail on the media outlets, saying, "If the press takes offence, it shows all they are interested in is government money... The media is saying: 'Government, you can make all the press statements you want, but if you don't pay us we won't carry these.'" As the centralisation process was rolled out in 2012, DA leader Mmusi Maimane accused of Manyi of assembling a "propaganda machine" and of seeking "to shield the government's advertising expenditure from public scrutiny".

=== Crisis in SANEF relations: June 2011 ===
A major feature of Manyi's tenure at GCIS was his increasingly poor relations with the press. In mid-2011, the Sunday Times advised Manyi, "you should not accept a job as cabinet's spokesman if you hate dealing with the press", while a Mail & Guardian editorial said that Manyi "is increasingly reminding me of a mash-up of George Orwell's Nineteen Eighty-Four and the movie This Is Spinal Tap... Because there seems to be a desire, à la the Spinal Tap amplifier that has a volume knob that goes up to 11, to ramp up the vitriol and doublespeak when it comes to portraying 'the media' in South Africa". Tensions peaked in June 2011, in the aftermath of Manyi's announcement about the restructuring of advertising spending and also amid a controversy about the Secrecy Bill. A meeting between SANEF and a GCIS delegation in mid-June ended in deadlock.

In this context, appearing on Radio 702 on 21 June, Manyi launched a personal attack on SANEF's chairperson, Mondli Makhanya of Avusa Media, whom he accused of fostering anti-government hostility among journalists through his "cartel-like tendencies". In response, Makhanya said that Manyi was personally responsible for rapidly deteriorating relations between the media and the state, which he said had not been so bad "even in the days of [former minister] Essop Pahad". SANEF requested an urgent meeting with Manyi's boss, Minister Chabane, to discuss GCIS–press relations, which Makhanya said were "headed for rock bottom". The National Press Club supported SANEF, saying, "The media fraternity is extremely concerned about Manyi's hostility", and called for intervention "at the highest level". Manyi said that the problem long predated his arrival at GCIS.

=== e-Tolls: February 2012 ===
In February 2012, articulating the government's position on Gauteng's highly unpopular e-tolls, Manyi told the public, "This is not just a bad dream; it's a reality, it's going to happen. No one should have any illusion whatsoever that this thing is going to go away. It's a fact of life and it's going to happen". He was long remembered for this remark, which critics said exemplified his abrasive communications style. In April 2012, as Cosatu promised the "mother of all protests" against the tolls, Manyi explained, "the whole process is quite simply a roll out of democracy".

=== Departure: August 2012 ===
Manyi continued at the head of GCIS until mid-2012, and in January of that year, he was additionally appointed by Zuma to a three-year term on the five-person board of the Media Development and Diversity Agency. However, in June, the Mail & Guardian reported that Manyi's three-year contract as director-general – counted as having begun in 2009 when he entered the Department of Labour – would not be renewed when it expired in August.

On 27 August 2012, the expiry of Manyi's contract was formally announced, and he departed the GCIS office. The Mail & Guardian had reported earlier that week that an ambitious proposal by Manyi for organisational restructuring had been blocked by the National Treasury and Ministry in the Presidency.

=== Alleged role in state capture ===
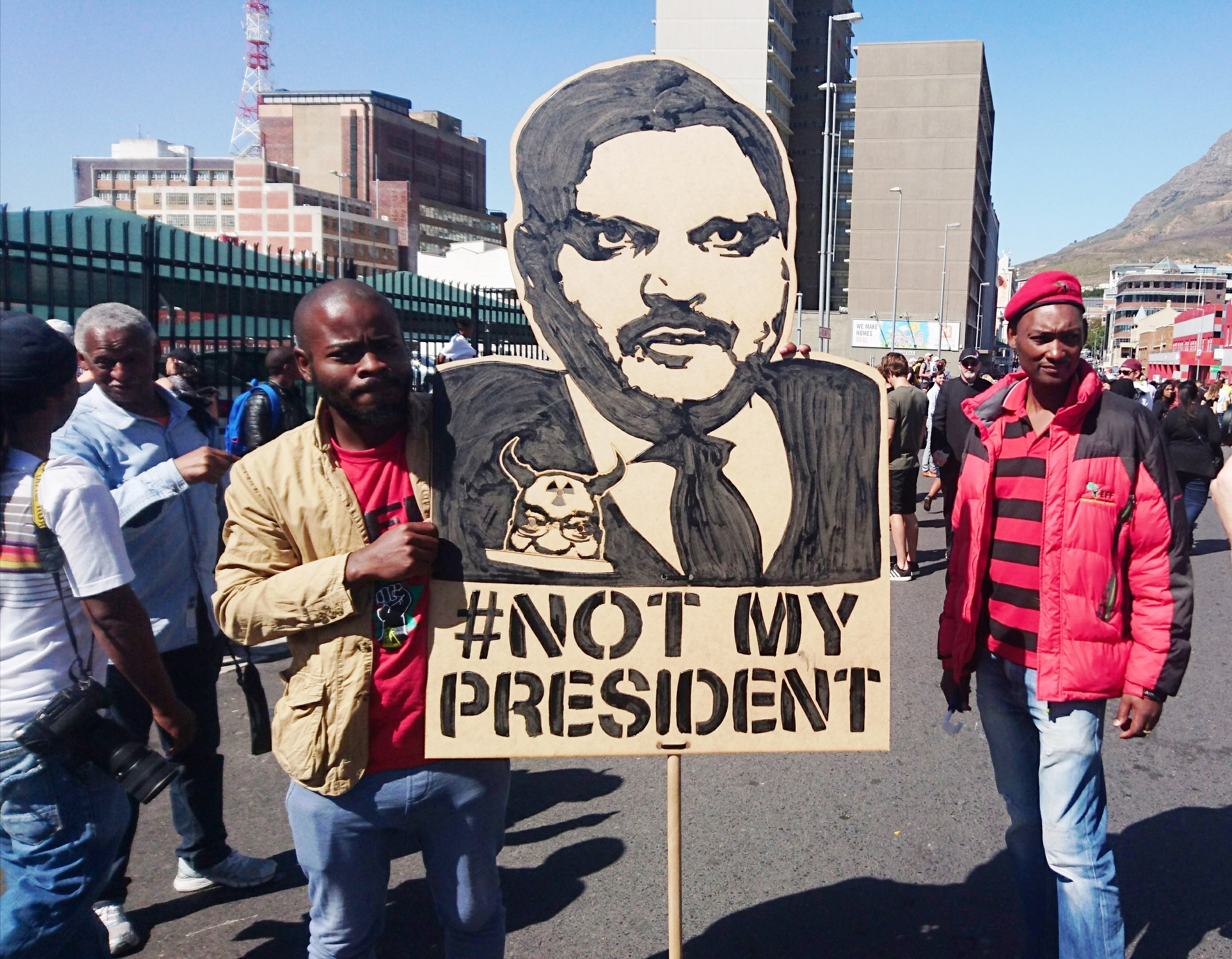
Two EFF members carry a placard depicting Atul Gupta at a Zuma Must Fall protest in Cape Town, April 2017.

Even after Manyi left GCIS, his tenure in the department – less than two years in duration – remained controversial. In later years, GCIS was identified as a possible site of state capture by the controversial Gupta family, who were alleged to have acquired undue influence over the Zuma administration. Manyi, who went on to become an employee and prominent defender of the Guptas, was implicated in several respects, but his tenure at GCIS, in particular, was investigated by the Commission of Inquiry into Allegations of State Capture (colloquially the Zondo Commission). Established in 2018, the commission's terms of reference included an instruction to investigate irregularities in the award of government advertising contracts to the New Age, the government-friendly Gupta-owned newspaper established in 2010.

One central point of discussion was the circumstances under which Manyi had entered GCIS in 2011, unseating his respected predecessor, Themba Maseko, who later blew the whistle on state capture. In July 2019, former President Zuma told the Zondo Commission that Maseko had been removed because of a conflict between him and former Minister in the Presidency, Collins Chabane, who had died in 2015. Maseko accused Zuma of lying, and he was supported by commission chairperson Raymond Zondo, who observed that Chabane had given Maseko an extremely high performance score (114%) shortly before Maseko was removed. Instead, Maseko said that he had been fired on Zuma's instructions because he had refused to help channel the government's advertising spending to the Gupta-owned New Age. In addition, GCIS deputy director-general Phumla Williams testified that the transition from Maseko's leadership to Manyi's leadership was the most rapid she had ever witnessed in government, with Manyi asking to be introduced to his new staff before Maseko had even moved out of his former office.

The commission heard evidence that the New Age had received a disproportionately large share of government advertising contracts, relative to its circulation; in the 2011/2012 financial year, it had received R8.7 million from government, while three major newspapers – the City Press, the Star, and the Sunday Times – had received less than R200,000 apiece. Williams additionally testified that Manyi had changed GCIS's media procurement processes, requiring that he, rather than the department's bid adjudication committee, would sign off on tender processing, and that both the media-buying division and the internal audit unit would report directly to him.

==== Testimony to the Zondo Commission ====
During his testimony to the Zondo Commission in 2018 and 2019, Manyi contradicted these claims. He said that he had dismantled the bid committee and sidelined Williams in the oversight of internal audit precisely because Williams and the bid committee had been implicated in procurement irregularities. He also questioned the commission's approach, saying that he could not speculate about why he had been hired at GCIS and arguing, "I was a pawn in the process. Why are you calling a pawn? Why don't you call the people who were playing the chess?" He challenged the commission to broaden the scope of its investigations, contending "that actually there has never been a time in which the state has not been captured"; he suggested that the capture of the state by white monopoly capital predated the Gupta empire and in fact had led to the downfall of the Gupta empire. By then, Manyi was in fact the owner of the defunct New Age, and he argued that the newspaper, quite contrary to being an instrument of state capture, had threatened the interests of white media monopolists, who, in collaboration with the National Treasury, had created "this monster called the Guptas" as a diversionary narrative.

==== Zondo Commission findings ====
The Zondo Commission, in its first installment of the final report released in January 2022, unequivocally rejected Mzwanele Manyi's defense regarding his actions during his tenure as chief executive officer of the Government Communication and Information System (GCIS). The commission determined that Manyi's installation at GCIS represented one of the initial acts of state capture by the Gupta family, highlighting that he "cooperated with the Guptas" and failed to justify the substantial government advertising expenditures directed to The New Age, a newspaper owned by the Gupta family. Consequently, Manyi was identified as a "facilitator" of state capture, and GCIS under his leadership was labeled an "enabler" of the corrupt activities linked to the Gupta family's influence over the Zuma administration.

In response, Manyi vehemently criticized the commission's conclusions, describing them as "rubbish" and asserting that they were not substantiated by credible evidence. He argued that the commission's findings were influenced by his later role as the spokesperson for former President Jacob Zuma, whom he referred to as "the most-hated person" in South Africa. Manyi maintained that his real "crime" was his association with Zuma, rather than any misconduct during his time at GCIS, suggesting that the narrative surrounding state capture had been manipulated to unfairly target him.

== Post-GCIS (2012–2023) ==
Manyi vacated the BMF presidency in October 2012, two months after leaving GCIS; Bonang Mohale was elected unopposed to succeed him. However, Manyi remained prominent in several other civil society organisations, in the media, and as prolific Twitter user. He also ran his own investment firm, Afrotone.

=== Straight Talk and the Guptas ===
In August 2013, the Gupta brothers launched ANN7, a joint venture between their Oakbay Investments and India's Essel Media. Later the same month, ANN7 announced that Manyi would host a weekly interview show, Straight Talk, on the channel, airing on Saturday afternoons in direct competition with other channels' sports offerings. The tagline of the show was "No comment is not an option". Manyi said that ANN7 had "headhunted" him: "They were looking for someone fresh and bold who is able to deal with different and difficult issues." However, in 2018, former ANN7 editor Rajesh Sundaram claimed in his tell-all book that Manyi had been hired as a presenter at the suggestion of President Zuma, despite having "failed miserably" during his interview for the position.

During and after his employment at ANN7, Manyi frequently defended the Gupta brothers in the press. Journalist Ferial Haffajee, while admiring Manyi as "an architect of modern [black economic] empowerment laws" and "an eloquent spokesperson for empowerment", said that he was "clearly a Gupta lieutenant or stooge"; Palesa Morudu said that his "main occupation seems to be acting as a shill for the Guptas". In 2017, the Gupta Leaks revealed that Manyi, in 2014, had sent his own CV and that of a former colleague, Xoliswa Mpongoshe, to the Guptas, apparently with the expectation that the family would secure employment for them, according to Mpongoshe probably on the board of a parastatal. Manyi said he had no recollection of the emails and later told CapeTalk that there was nothing untoward about them.

=== Government posts ===
In May 2013, Manyi was appointed as a senior manager at Rand Water, a public water utility, responsible for strategy. In July 2014, he was additionally appointed as a member of the National Communications Task Team, an advisory panel established by Faith Muthambi, then the Minister of Communications. He also remained a board member at the Media Development and Diversity Agency until October 2014, when he was appointed as a special adviser to Minister Muthambi. He held the ministry position simultaneously with the Rand Water post. His departure from the communications ministry was revealed belatedly in October 2016: he had recently defended the SABC's Hlaudi Motsoeneng, following reports that Motsoeneng had lied about his qualifications, and Muthambi's office released a statement distancing itself from Manyi's remarks and saying that "Manyi is no longer an advisor to the Minister of Communications and therefore does not speak on behalf of the Ministry".

In November 2017, a week after the Sunday Times reported that Manyi had sent his CV to the Guptas, former Minister of Public Service and Administration Ngoako Ramatlhodi told the same newspaper that he had blocked an attempt by Mosebenzi Zwane, a Gupta-linked minister, to have Manyi hired as director-general in the Department of Mineral Resources in 2016. Ramtlhodi later told the Zondo Commission that he believed he had been dismissed from the cabinet in early 2017 partly because of his refusal to sign off on Manyi's hiring.

=== Civil society platforms ===
==== Progressive Professionals Forum ====
In 2013, Manyi became the founding president of a new organisation, the Progressive Professionals Forum (PPF). Openly affiliated to the ANC – though purportedly independent of the party – the PPF's mission was to represent professionals and intellectuals who supported the ANC's agenda and policies, with its founding secretary-general, Siphile Buthelezi, explaining, "we are the beneficiaries of the ANC-led government policies and now it is time to plough back". In 2017, following a parliamentary question from the DA's David Maynier, the government disclosed that two parastatals, Eskom and Transnet, had provided R840,000 in donations to the PPF.

From his PPF platform, Manyi remained an outspoken advocate for so-called radical economic transformation. In January 2017, Manyi announced that the PPF was "not convinced" about the merits of constitutional democracy and supported a "discussion" about a possible transition to pure majoritarian democracy under parliamentary sovereignty. Controversially, Manyi argued that the South African Constitution had been introduced during the post-apartheid transition by the Afrikaner Broederbond, who benefitted from constitutional democracy because it limited the democratic government's ability to effect structural economic change. He reprised this argument on several occasions, and additionally argued in March 2017 that ANC policies, including the Public Finance Management system, had been "infiltrated" and now served white monopoly capital. In one example derided by columnists, Manyi criticised a 2017 tax increase for South Africa's top earners (about 105,000 people), saying that a heavy income tax on earnings above R1.5 million favoured white monopoly capital and disadvantaged the black middle class.

Manyi also spearheaded the PPF's vociferous opposition to the Financial Intelligence Centre Amendment Bill (FIC), which updated anti-money laundering measures to meet international standards. Manyi argued that the bill was prejudicial to the ANC's black donors, who he said would be persecuted as politically exposed persons. He warned that the FIC was "dangerous", would "enslave" businesspeople, and would ensure that the ANC ended up "broke as hell". The ANC's Cyril Ramaphosa distanced the party from the PPF's stance, clarifying that the party did not accept laundered donations.

People are hypocritical. Whatever is perceived to have been done by them cannot be worse than what apartheid has done in this country. If the [Guptas] have committed any crime, our own constitution says presumption of innocence until proven guilty.

— Manyi on "Guptaphobia", August 2017

On at least one occasion, the PPF distanced itself from views expressed by its president. In late April 2017, Manyi told the press that he was unbothered by the public perception that he was a Gupta associate, because the Guptas had not been found guilty of any wrongdoing, except the crime of challenging the dominance of white monopoly capital. In Manyi's words, "I am not Guptaphobic, and I would like people to be cured of that disease". The PPF released a statement saying that the organisation did not share Manyi's diagnosis of "Guptaphobia" and was vehemently opposed to any individuals or organisations who had been involved in state capture.

==== Black Business Council ====
Manyi was also active in the Black Business Council (BBC), and in late September 2016 he was elected as the council's head of policy, serving under BBC president Danisa Baloyi. In December of that year, the Sunday Times published reports, denied by Manyi, that he had been rebuffed by the BBC's membership committee after he proposed that the Guptas' Oakbay Resources would provide a R5-million donation in exchange for corporate membership of the council.

Manyi remained in the policy role for only six months, stepping down in late March 2017. Though the Business Day reported that he had been forced to resign due to his association with the Guptas, Manyi said that he was leaving to focus on his other responsibilities, especially assisting with the launch of the PPF's youth and student wings. He remained a member of the BBC national council in his capacity as a PPF representative.

==== Decolonisation Foundation ====
In August 2016, Manyi founded the Mzwanele Manyi Decolonisation Foundation. Soon after its establishment, the foundation lodged a flurry of formal complaints against public figures generally viewed as hostile to the Guptas. Among other things, the foundation asked the Public Protector to investigate three former finance ministers – Trevor Manuel, Pravin Gordhan and Nhlanhla Nene – for dereliction of duty in connection with the approval of dodgy tenders for the construction of the Medupi and Kusile power stations. He also said he would lodge complaints against AngloGold Ashanti and its chairman, Sipho Pityana, in response to Pityana's call for business leaders to take a stand against the ANC and demand Zuma's removal from office.

In March 2017, when the Sunday Times published its exposé of a Gupta-aligned fake news campaign coordinated by British firm Bell Pottinger, the newspaper claimed to have seen leaked internal documents proving that Manyi's Decolonisation Foundation, as well as Andile Mngxitama's Black First Land First, had been established or funded by Bell Pottinger as part of the campaign. In a follow-up report, the Sunday Times labelled Manyi as one of the "real-life commanders of the Guptas' fake news army", claiming that Manyi's Twitter account had been one of the 19 authentic accounts which, alongside a network of bot accounts, had amplified pro-Zuma and pro-Gupta social media campaigns. Manyi denied any direct links to or funding from Bell Pottinger.

=== Media acquisitions ===
On 21 August 2017, the Guptas' Oakbay Investments announced that it had sold both of its media units – Infinity Media, which operated broadcaster ANN7, and TNA Media, which operated newspaper the New Age – to Lodidox, a company in which Manyi was the sole shareholder. The R450-million acquisition was sponsored by Oakbay through a vendor-financing agreement. The deal created a major stir, especially because of the financing arrangement and because the price – R300 million for ANN7 and R150 million for the New Age – was widely viewed as inflated. Some observers suggested that Manyi had been installed to front for the Guptas, either to make the media companies more attractive clients to banks – as related bank accounts had recently been closed in the aftermath of the state capture scandal – or to facilitate money laundering. Manyi strongly denied these suggestions.

Manyi said that the media companies would retain their earlier strategy of pursuing advertising business with the state, promising, "I'll be knocking on government doors unapologetically because they talk about radical economic transformation, so I'll be saying: 'Stay true to your word'." In April 2018, he announced a "strategic decision" to distance the companies from their former owners through rebranding, with ANN7 renamed Afro Worldview and the New Age renamed Afro Voice; he also said that he had fully repaid his vendor debt to Oakbay Investments, after the amount had been lowered through renegotiations. ANN7 continued to bid for a new broadcasting contract, after Multichoice said that it would drop the channel in August 2018 due to the channel's involvement in "controversies".

In June 2018, Afro Voice staff told the press that the newspaper had ceased production, and in July, Manyi applied to liquidate the newspaper. In court papers, Manyi said that the newspaper's revenues had declined due to the cancellation of state contracts and negative perceptions of the Guptas, while operations had been negatively affected by the collapse of VBS Mutual Bank, the custodian of the newspaper's operational bank accounts. Afro Worldview ceased to air the following month; Manyi refused to comment "on Afro Worldview business on any issue whatsoever".

=== Jacob Zuma Foundation ===
In June 2021, former President Zuma's daughter, Dudu Zuma-Sambudla, announced that Manyi had been appointed as official spokesman to her father and his foundation, the Jacob G. Zuma Foundation. Zuma had been removed from the presidency in 2018 and was facing revived corruption charges, and Manyi was to provide Zuma's "side of the story" in the trial and all other matters.

=== African Transformation Movement (2019–2023) ===
Formerly a member of the governing African National Congress (ANC), Manyi announced in January 2019 that he would join the African Transformation Movement (ATM), a party founded in 2018 that became closely associated with supporters of Zuma and of Radical Economic Transformation. At the press conference where he announced his decision, Manyi said that the ANC was "sabotaging" itself, particularly in its apparent lack of will to implement land expropriation without compensation and other transformative measures. ATM leader Vuyolwethu Zungula said that the party had no objection to Manyi's history, saying:

We want to transform society. We can't just be working with the most clean people. We can't reject a person from wanting to take part in developing South Africa... [Manyi's] character has changed, his language has changed, because the work of the ATM is to transform minds. It can best be seen in Manyi.

Manyi's recruitment to the ATM followed an abortive attempt to establish his own movement, the All Africa Decolonisation Congress (AADC), in December 2018. The day after he announced that he was joining the ATM, the AADC released a statement saying that it felt it had to "distance ourselves from Mzwanele Jimmy Manyi and all his fraudulent activities", especially because Manyi intended for the AADC to ally with the ATM. In the statement, the AADC's Edward Mokomele said that he had become aware that "Manyi and ATM leadership are laundering money through the party" via sympathetic churches, and additionally claimed that Manyi had met with the Guptas overseas to discuss the funding of the AADC. Manyi said that he would sue for defamation and that, "AADC is my own creation, my own party and I will prove that by shutting it down".

Manyi was appointed to the ATM's national executive committee and as the party's head of policy. In addition, in the 2019 general election, he stood as an ATM candidate for election to the National Assembly, but he was ranked 14th on the ATM's party list and was not elected to a seat.

== Member of Parliament (2023–present) ==
=== Economic Freedom Fighters ===
In May 2023, ahead of the next year's general election, Manyi announced that he was leaving the ATM to join the Economic Freedom Fighters (EFF), another opposition party. He said that he was leaving the ATM amicably and hoped to act as a bridge between the two parties. He explained that, because the EFF was a larger party than the ATM, "I have decided that I can serve South Africa better in an organization like the EFF".

On 6 June 2023, it was reported that Manyi had selected by the EFF to represent the party in the National Assembly. He was sworn in the following day in a ceremony presided over by Speaker Nosiviwe Mapisa-Nqakula.

=== MK Party 15 August 2024 to present ===
In mid-August 2024, Mzwanele Manyi resigned from the Economic Freedom Fighters (EFF). On Monday, 12 August 2024, Manyi tendered his resignation from the EFF, a decision that was soon followed by the resignation of former EFF Deputy President Floyd Shivambu on Thursday, 15 August 2024. The news of their departures was publicly announced by Julius Malema, the leader of the EFF, during a press conference on Friday of that same week.

Although the timing of the resignations appeared coordinated, Manyi clarified that he was unaware of Shivambu's plans to resign and expressed surprise at the coincidence. Following his departure from the EFF, Manyi joined former President Jacob Zuma's newly established uMkhonto weSizwe Party (MKP). He was sworn in as an MP for the second time in August 2024.

Immediately after being sworn in as a member of the MKP, Manyi was appointed as the party's Chief Whip, before being dismissed in May 2025.

== Personal life ==
Manyi was commonly known as Jimmy until around 2015, when he began going by Mzwanele. According to Manyi, he decided to make the change during the Rhodes Must Fall protests of 2015, on the same day that the statue of Cecil Rhodes was toppled at the University of Cape Town. He now rejects the name wholeheartedly as a matter of decolonial principle, and told the Sunday Times in 2017:

The only reason I [was] called 'Jimmy' was for working purposes, to enable the white man to be able to call me for work. So it's no different from having a slave name, because the master would struggle to say Mzwanele. Now that I am my own master I get very offended if you insist on using 'Jimmy', because I feel like you're enslaving me.

He married Nomaphelo, also known as Stella, in around 1985, and they have three children together. He is also a lay preacher at the Bantu Church of Christ.
