= Phumla Williams =

South African public servant (born 1960)

Deputy Director-General of the Government Communication and Information System
- In office 2009–2020
- President: Jacob Zuma

Chief Executive Officer (CEO) of the Government Communication and Information System
- In office 2020–2022
- President: Cyril Ramaphosa
- Preceded by: Donald Liphoko

Chief Financial Officer (CFO) of the Government Communication and Information System
- In office 1998–2009
- President: Thabo Mbeki

Personal details
- Born: Mirriam Phumla Williams; 1 July 1960 (age 65) Pimville, Soweto, Gauteng, South Africa
- Party: African National Congress

Mirriam Phumla Williams (born 1 July 1960) is a former South African public servant who served as spokeswoman of the Cabinet of South Africa and Chief Executive Officer of the Government Communication and Information System (GCIS). An anti-apartheid activist for the African National Congress (ANC), she was an operative of the uMkhonto we Sizwe (MK) from 1978 until its disbandment in 1993.

As head of GCIS, Williams was responsible for all of South Africa's government communications - in charge of all spokespeople in government departments - and the spokeswoman for the Government of South Africa.

== Early life and political activism ==
Phumla Williams was born in Pimville, Soweto on 1 July 1960. She attended Musi High School. As a member of the ANC, her involvement in politics began after pupils across Soweto schools were shot and arrested by apartheid police during the 1976 Soweto student riots. She said during the day of the riots her female schoolmate was shot dead by an apartheid policeman when a stray bullet hit her while she was sweeping the yard of her home. In 1978, Williams left South Africa to join the exiled ANC in Swaziland and subsequently its military wing, the uMkhonto we Sizwe. Williams was based in Swaziland and Mozambique. She was arrested and tortured for weeks in 1989 for plotting to topple the apartheid government.

On being released in the early 1990s after the release of Nelson Mandela and the unbanning of political parties by apartheid-era president F.W. de Klerk, she worked at the ANC's Johannesburg headquarters as administrator before joining government in 1995.

== Education and career ==
Williams holds a Master's Degree in Public Administration from the University of South Africa. When she joined government in 1995, Williams served as Director of Finance of GCIS and was then appointed the Chief Financial Officer (CFO) of GCIS in 1998. In 2009, she became the Deputy Chief Executive Officer (CEO) of the GCIS until August 2012 when she became the acting CEO following the expiry of CEO Mzwanele Manyi's contract, serving in the acting capacity until May 2020 when she was appointed the CEO of the GCIS - becoming the first female to hold such a position. She resigned in 2022.
