= Themba Maseko =

South African businessman and public servant (born 1964)

Chief Executive Officer of the Government Communication and Information System
- In office 2006–2011
- President: Thabo Mbeki; Kgalema Motlanthe; Jacob Zuma
- Preceded by: Joel Netshitenzhe
- Succeeded by: Mzwanele Manyi

Member of the National Assembly
- In office 1994–1995

Personal details
- Born: 27 January 1964 (age 62)
- Citizenship: South African
- Party: African National Congress
- Education: University of Witwatersrand; DeMontfort University

Themba Mveli James Maseko (born 27 January 1964) is a South African businessman, former public servant, and whistleblower who was the head of the Government Communication and Information System (GCIS) between 2006 and 2011. Since July 2024, he has been the head of the Wits School of Governance at the University of the Witwatersrand. He is known for publicly accusing the Gupta brothers of attempting improperly to influence the allocation of public advertising contracts during his time at GCIS.

Formerly an anti-apartheid activist, Maseko was briefly a member of the National Assembly of South Africa between 1994 and 1995, representing the African National Congress. In addition to his position at GCIS, and between stints in the private sector, he served as head of the Gauteng Department of Education from 1995 to 2000, as head of the national Department of Public Works from 2003 to 2006, and as head of the national Department of Public Service and Administration in 2011.

== Early life and education ==
Maseko was born on 27 January 1964. He matriculated in 1982 at Immaculata High School in Diepkloof, Soweto. Thereafter he attended the University of the Witwatersrand (Wits), completing a BA in sociology and law in 1987 and an LLB in 1992. Later, in 2002, he completed an MBA at De Montfort University in the Leicester, England.

== Career ==
While a student, Maseko was active in the students' anti-apartheid movement, including as a member of the South African National Students Congress and the Azanian Students' Organisation, and he joined the National Education Coordinating Committee (NECC) in 1990. From 1991 to 1993 he was the general secretary of NECC, and during that period he was also a member of the Regional Executive Committee of the South African Communist Party in Gauteng. In the April 1994 general election, he was elected to represent the African National Congress (ANC) in the National Assembly, the newly established lower house of the post-apartheid Parliament of South Africa.

Maseko resigned from the National Assembly in 1995 and became superintendent-general of the Gauteng Department of Education from 1995 to 2000. During a subsequent stint in the private sector, in 2001 and 2002 he was managing director of the Damelin Education Group and CEO of Sifikile Investments.

=== National government ===
From February 2003 to February 2006, Maseko was the director-general of the national Department of Public Works, then under the political leadership of Minister Stella Sigcau. He returned briefly to the private sector until 14 June 2006, when the Cabinet approved his appointment as CEO of the Government Communication and Information System (GCIS), a position which came with the responsibilities of cabinet spokesperson. He succeeded Joel Netshitenzhe in the role.

Initially appointed for three years, he remained in office at GCIS until 2011, a period which spanned the end of Thabo Mbeki's presidency, the entirety of Kgalema Motlanthe's presidency, and the first quarter of Jacob Zuma's presidency. Maseko's departure from GCIS, announced by Minister in the Presidency Collins Chabane on 2 February 2011 and taking immediate effect, was met with the surprise of the media, which had viewed Maseko as a competent public servant. Chabane said that Maseko had "requested to be moved within government" and that Jimmy Manyi would replace him at GCIS.

Upon his exit from GCIS, Maseko was transferred to become director-general of the national Department of Public Service and Administration. Although his contract was due to last until the end of June 2012, he resigned with effect from 22 July 2011, after less than six months in the new position. Maseko later explained that his relationship with Public Service Minister Richard Baloyi "did not gel", saying that Baloyi "felt I was imposed on him" and that he was sidelined in departmental decision-making.

=== Whistleblowing ===
In October 2016, Maseko allegedly publicly – in a submission to a civil society panel and in an interview with City Press – that President Zuma had sacked him from GCIS in 2011 because of his refusal to acquiesce in state capture. According to Maseko, the Zuma-allied Gupta brothers had repeatedly lobbied him to use public funds to place advertisements in their New Age newspaper. In 2018 he provided testimony in this vein to the Zondo Commission, which concluded in its final report that Maseko's replacement by Manyi had been calculated to facilitate state capture by the Guptas.

In 2021, Maseko published a memoir titled For My Country: Why I Blew the Whistle on Zuma and the Guptas. He won a Whistleblower Award in the "Individual Whistleblower Excellence" category at Public Interest SA's inaugural Whistleblower Awards in October 2023.

=== Later career ===
On 7 August 2017, Business Leadership South Africa (BLSA) announced that Maseko had been appointed as its director of communications. However, BLSA did not renew his contract at the expiry of its one-year term on 31 July 2018, instead embarking upon an overhaul of its communications department; Maseko said that his departure was amicable.

In January 2022, Maseko announced on Twitter that he had been appointed as the executive director of the executive development unit at the Wits School of Governance, housed at his alma mater. He was also an adjunct professor there. He became acting head of the school in September 2023 and was permanently appointed to the position from 1 July 2024.

== Other activities ==
Before his appointment to GCIS, Maseko was a member of the council of Vista University and a member of the boards of the Adopt-a-School Foundation and the Centre for Public Service Innovation. In later years, he was a member of the boards of the Nelson Mandela Foundation, Corruption Watch, and the Council for the Advancement of the South African Constitution.

== Personal life ==
Maseko married Phindile in 1991 and they had children. She went to Bopasenatla Secondary School in Soweto and they married without inviting their families to save money. They lived in Sandton, Johannesburg.
