= ANN7 =

South African TV news channel

Afro Worldview
- Country: South Africa
- Broadcast area: South Africa; Sub-Saharan Africa
- Network: DSTV
- Headquarters: Midrand, South Africa

Programming
- Language: English
- Picture format: 16:9 (576i, SDTV)

Ownership
- Owner: Mzwanele Manyi (since 2017); Atul Gupta, Ajay Gupta

History
- Launched: 21 August 2013; 13 years ago
- Closed: 20 August 2018; 8 years ago
- Replaced by: Newzroom Afrika
- Former names: ANN7 (2013 - 2018)

ANN7 (Africa News Network 7), later renamed to Afro Worldview, was a 24-hour satellite TV news channel that operated from August 2013 to August 2018 in South Africa. It was established and owned by the Gupta family. The channel was broadcast on the DStv satellite television service owned by Multichoice.

== History ==
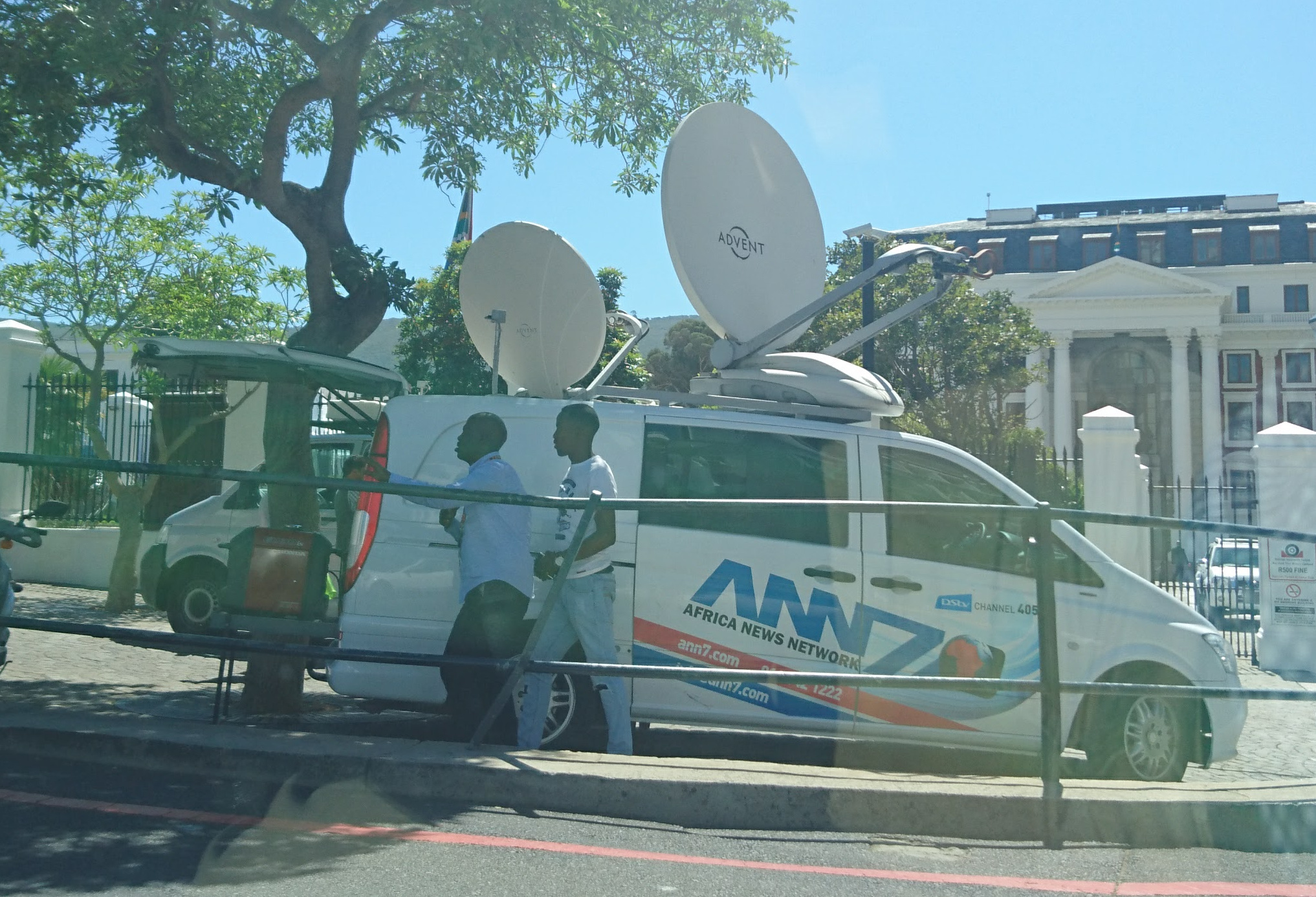
An ANN7 news van parked outside of Parliament in Cape Town.

The channel's launch in August 2013 was initially met with public mockery when numerous technical issues and mistakes made by untrained presenters went viral online.

In 2017, the channel was sold to Afrotone Media Holdings, a holding company owned by former Tiger Brands group executive Mzwanele Manyi.

In January 2018, It was announced that ANN7 would shut down on 20 August 2018 due to failure to renew their contract with DStv. The channel was renamed Afro Worldview on 30 April 2018, but still ceased to air on the platform.

Afro Worldview logo used after the name ANN7 was discontinued until the channel was shut down soon afterwards

== Ownership ==
Prior to August 2017, ANN7 was primarily controlled by Infinity Media Networks which was owned jointly by Essel Media (35%), Oakbay Investments, the Gupta family's investment vehicle (35%), Mabengela Investments (21%). Mabengela Investments is a Broad-Based Black Economic Empowerment company of which Duduzane Zuma -the son of President Jacob Zuma- held a 45% stake, with other shareholders including Rajesh Kumar Gupta (25%), Aerohaven Trading (15%), Fidelity Investments (10%), Mfazi Investments (3%) and Ashu Chawla (2%). In August 2017, ANN7 and The New Age were sold to Mzwanele Manyi.

== Format ==
Programming provided by ANN7 included news segments, sports highlights, political and news-based talk-shows with round-table discussions, nationwide weather reports, and lifestyle, entertainment and special interest news

The ANN7 studios, operated out of their purpose-built Midrand studio, employed a team of 76 journalists. According to its website, Africa News Network 7 (ANN7) focused on "constructive, nation-building stories in the interests of building a culture of unity and pride."

== Accusations of propaganda ==
In March 2017, during the run-up to President Jacob Zuma's firing of Finance Minister Pravin Gordhan — who had previously actively resisted the pro-Zuma Gupta family's continued and repeated attempts at state capture of the Treasury, Eskom and other state-owned companies — ANN7 ran repeated and aggressive propaganda campaigns to discredit the minister, often using incomplete or fabricated evidence. The channel was fiercely criticised for spreading partial, biased and fake news in a bid to undermine the Finance Minister, and paint the President in a more favourable light.

The international news broadcaster Al Jazeera English reported that Zuma's close relationship with the Guptas has "translated into friendly coverage in the outlets they own," such as ANN7 and The New Age newspaper.

During the Zondo Commission of Inquiry into state capture in June 2019 former ANN7 editor, Rajesh Sundara, testified that then president Jacob Zuma was actively involved in running the station and dictating its content and message.

=== Coverage of the 2016 Gupta family controversy ===
"[T]he NEC expressed its utmost disgust at the arrogance, disrespect and reckless journalism displayed by the New Age Newspaper (18, 19 March 2016), ANN7 News Channel (16–18 March 2016) and representatives of the Gupta-family. They have characterized the ANC as a group of factions for and against President Zuma."

- Gwede Mantashe, ANC secretary general

In March 2016 ANN7, along with the Gupta-owned newspaper The New Age, was strongly criticised by the African National Congress (ANC) for its coverage of President Jacob Zuma's relationship with the Gupta family and the ensuing political controversy around the issue. The broadcaster along with The New Age apologised for its coverage shortly after the ANC's criticism was stated.
