= Joel Netshitenzhe =

South African politician and political strategist

Head of Government Communication and Information System
- In office 1998–2006
- President: Nelson Mandela; Thabo Mbeki
- Preceded by: Office established
- Succeeded by: Themba Maseko

Personal details
- Born: 21 December 1956 (age 69) Sibasa, Northern Transvaal; Union of South Africa
- Citizenship: South African
- Party: African National Congress
- Education: School of Oriental and African Studies
- Occupation: Politician; strategist; anti-apartheid activist

Joel Netshitenzhe (born 21 December 1956) is a South African politician and strategist, known for his policy and communications work for the African National Congress (ANC). He served as head of communications under President Nelson Mandela (1994); head of Government Communication and Information System (1998–2006); and head of the policy unit in the Presidency (2001–2009) under Presidents Thabo Mbeki and Jacob Zuma, though he was viewed as a particularly close ally of Mbeki's. A former anti-apartheid activist, Netshitenzhe was a member of the ANC National Executive Committee between 1991 and 2022, and he was a member of the ANC's delegation to the negotiations that ended apartheid.

== Early life and career ==
Netshitenzhe was born on 21 December 1956 in Sibasa, Northern Transvaal, a village in what became the bantustan of Venda and, after the end of apartheid, became the Limpopo province. He attended medical school at the University of Natal, but dropped out at age twenty to join the African National Congress (ANC) in exile. He received military training (with Umkhonto weSizwe) in Angola until 1978, and then, remaining in exile, worked as a journalist at the ANC's Radio Freedom. He went on to edit the organisation's official journal, Mayibuye, under his nom de guerre, Peter Mayibuye. In 1984, he received a diploma in Political Science from the Institute of Social Sciences in Moscow; he later earned a postgraduate diploma in economics (1996) and an MSc in financial economics (1999), both from London's School of Oriental and African Studies.

From 1983, Netshitenzhe was a member of the ANC's Political HQ (and later of its successor body, the Internal Political Committee), the arm of the ANC National Executive Committee with responsibility for the political aspects of the anti-apartheid struggle inside South Africa. By 1985, he was also a member of the broader Politico-Military Council, which coordinated the military and political aspects of the struggle. At the same time, between 1984 and 1990, Netshitenzhe was head of the ANC's information and propaganda department, becoming, in Ferial Haffajee's phase, the organisation's "ultimate spin doctor". He was first elected to the National Executive Committee itself, the ANC's top leadership body, in July 1991. By then, the National Party government of South Africa had unbanned the ANC, and Netshitenzhe returned to South Africa from exile to serve as a member of the ANC negotiating team during the negotiations to end apartheid.

== Career in government ==
After Nelson Mandela of the ANC was elected President in South Africa's first democratic elections in 1994, Netshitenzhe became Mandela's head of communications and principal speechwriter. In 1998, he was appointed the inaugural chief executive officer of the Government Communication and Information System (GCIS), which was established in that year to replace the apartheid-era South African Communications Services. In later years, and concurrently, he served as the head of policy in the Presidency under President Thabo Mbeki. The policy unit which he helped set up in the Presidency became known as Policy Coordination and Advisory Services (PCAS), and Netshitenzhe was viewed as particularly influential in developing macroeconomic policy.

When Jacob Zuma replaced Mbeki as President in 2009, Netshitenzhe became Director General of PCAS, in which capacity he was responsible for formulating policy alongside Minister Trevor Manuel, who oversaw the National Planning Commission. He resigned from PCAS unexpectedly in October 2009, with his resignation effective from the end of December. Although the media speculated that his resignation was related to recent criticisms he had made publicly of Zuma's administration, Netshitenzhe said that it had been by mutual agreement and was related to a reorganisation of the planning units in the Presidency and cabinet.

In 2010, he joined Nedbank as an independent non-executive director, and was a member of the National Planning Commission between 2010 and 2015. He also served on the boards of the Council for Scientific and Industrial Research and the Life Healthcare Group, was a visiting professor at the Wits School of Governance, and was executive director and vice chairperson at the Mapungubwe Institute for Strategic Reflection, a South African think tank.

== Career in the ANC ==
During the Mandela and Mbeki presidencies, Netshitenzhe continued to advise the ANC on communications while working for the government, and was viewed as one of the ANC's foremost strategists and policymakers, or, in the Mail & Guardian's phrase, as its "chief ideologue". A 1996 paper he wrote on the National Democratic Revolution for Umrabulo, an ANC magazine, was cited as central to the formulation of the ANC's post-apartheid cadre deployment policy. Netshitenzhe was particularly close to Mbeki: Mbeki's biographer, Mark Gevisser, viewed him as Mbeki's protégé, comparing his mentorship by Mbeki to Mbeki's earlier mentorship by Oliver Tambo. Netshitenzhe himself cited Mbeki and Pallo Jordan as key influences, and during Mbeki's presidency he was frequently touted as a possible successor to Mbeki.

However, the growing rivalry between Mbeki and Zuma was viewed as diminishing Netshitenzhe's prospects, as Zuma gained power within the ANC. Ahead of the ANC's 52nd National Conference in Polokwane in 2007, Netshitenzhe accepted a nomination to stand as National Chairperson of the party, but lost in a vote to Baleka Mbete, the Zuma-aligned candidate. He was, however, re-elected to the ANC National Executive Committee, and was again in 2012 and in 2017. In November 2022, ahead of the ANC's 55th National Conference, the ANC Veterans' League endorsed Netshitenzhe as a candidate for the National Chairperson post, although he had not campaigned for the position. When the conference was held, Netshitenzhe was not re-elected to the National Executive Committee; newly elected ANC Secretary-General Fikile Mbalula said that he viewed Netshitenzhe's exclusion as "a big problem".
