= Newzroom Afrika =

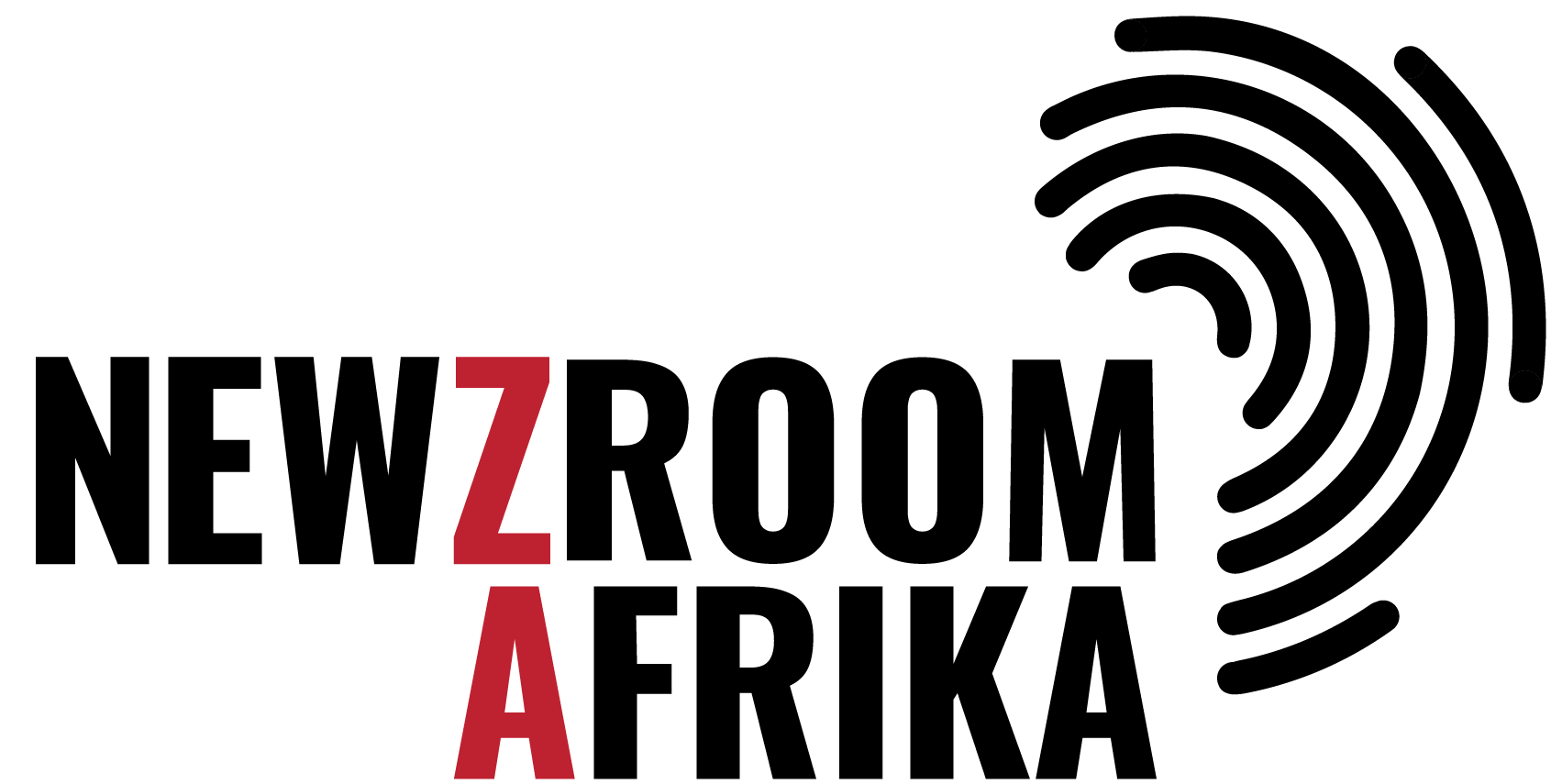
- Country: South Africa
- Broadcast area: South Africa; Sub-Saharan Africa
- Headquarters: Randburg, Johannesburg

Programming
- Language: English
- Picture format: 1080i HDTV

Ownership
- Sister channels: Movie Room; Play Room

History
- Launched: 2 May 2019; 7 years ago
- Replaced: Afro Worldview

Links
- Website: www.newzroomafrika.tv

Availability

Terrestrial
- Sentech: Channel depends on nearest repeater
- DStv: Channel 405

Newzroom Afrika is a South African 24-hour digital satellite television news channel broadcasting across Africa on DStv. It is one of two channels on the platform that is 100% black-owned, and 50% female-owned. The channel comes after MultiChoice ended their contract with the now defunct and controversial Afro Worldview. The channel has a number of top journalists who have long been in the industry, the likes of Xoli Mngambi, Vuyo Mvoko, Masa Kekana and Michelle Craig with established reporters as Linda Mnisi and Ziyanda Ngcobo. The news network is owned by Thabile Ngwato and Thokozani Nkosi as co-founders, Editor in chief and Managing director is Mapi Mhlangu

== Programming ==
• AM Report With Iman Rappetti and Arabile Gumede

Weekdays 06:00 - 09:00

• Newsfeed AM With Michelle Craig

Weekdays 09:00 - 12:00

• Daytime Update With Stephen Grootes

Weekdays 12:00 -15:00

• Newsfeed PM

Weekdays 15:00 - 17:00

• News@Prime With Xoli Mngambi

Sunday To Thursday 17:00 - 20:00

• Newsfeed Late Edition

Sunday To Thursday 20:00 - 23:00

Weekends

• Weekend Report with masechaba Mposwa

06:00 - 09:00

Newsfeed AM with katlego msomi

09:00 - 12:00

Newsfeed PM with Hugo Ribatika and mpumi Ngubeni

12:00 -15:00

Newsfeed PM with Thabo Mdluli

15:00 - 17:00

Madlanga Commission Wrap with Ziyanda Ngcobo

17:00- 18:00

Fridays

Weekend Prime with Masa Kekana

18:00 - 20:00

== Name ==
The "Z" in Newzroom has a significant meaning, it serves as a reminder of the news organization's desire to reach and stay at the Zenith of what they do. The letter "Z" is also a symbolic letter for South Africa and its citizens. Known as Zuid - Afrika, Azania and Mzansi. It represents the international code for South Africa, ZA.

== History ==
In August 2018, MultiChoice terminated their contract with Mzwanele Manyi's controversial Afro Worldview. MultiChoice announced that it would be looking for new bidders. Out of a total of 111 competitors, Newzroom Afrika was selected. According to M-Net CEO Yolisa Phahle, Newzroom Afrika had "met all the qualifying criteria". Newzroom Afrika is owned by media expert, Thokozani Nkosi (50%), and former news anchor, Thabile Ngwato (50%). The channel took to the airwaves on 2 May, ahead of the 2019 National and Provincial Elections, and boasts of familiar radio and TV personalities. The channel competes with the public broadcaster's SABC News and eMedia Investments' news station eNCA.
