= Vukuzenzele =

South African newspaper

Vuk’uzenzele
- Type: Semi-monthly newspaper
- Format: Online newspaper
- Headquarters: Pretoria, Gauteng, South Africa
- Website: www.vukuzenzele.gov.za

Vuk’uzenzele (isiXhosa and isiZulu for 'Get up and do it yourself') is a free South African government newspaper, published semi-monthly by the South African government communication and information system (CGIS). This GCIS flagship is intended to keep South Africans informed about the policies and activities of government as well as enhancing access to socio-economic opportunities.

== History ==
Vuk’uzenzele was originally, launched as a magazine in 2005, as an alternative to commercial publishers. In 2011 it migrated to a tabloid style newspaper. The publication was inspired by state publishing houses that are within the BRICS intergovernmental organisation which includes Brazil, Russia, India, China and South Africa. An example of such a publishing house is Russia's Rossiyskaya Gazeta. In order to promote reader access, the publication is partly translated into South Africa's eleven official languages and also available in Braille for the visually impaired.

== Distribution channels ==
Vuk’uzenzele claims a print run of 850 000 copies per edition. These numbers will have changed with the pivot to digital content delivery methods. Previously, Vuk’uzenzele used to be produced twice a month via two different channels. One edition was printed and distributed, while the other edition was published online at www.vukuzenzele.gov.za. Readers could receive the printed paper via home delivery or pick one up at a bulk distribution point, such as government offices, post offices (closed down), clinics, hospitals, municipalities, rural police stations and Thusong service centres. Now, they can download their government-sanctioned news on the App Store or Google Play.

From 2023 onwards, Vuks Talks podcasts have also been published twice a month. These intern produced and hosted shows, are used to amplify stories that are published by this government-funded newspaper. These podcasts include GCIS campaigns around Gender-based Violence and Economic Reconstruction. As of March 2024, Vuk’uzenzele is only available on digital platforms. The Editor in Chief of Vuk’uzenzele is Zanele Mngadi

Vernacular development has also drawn from the paper, and a corpora of textual data, in the 11 official languages of South Africa, has also been scraped from, Vuk’uzenzele, and used for a large multilingual language model. Data Science for Societal Impact Research Group have made this available on GitHub
