= Khampepe Commission =

The Khampepe Commission was a judicial commission of enquiry headed by Judge Sisi Khampepe that was established to investigate the Scorpions and recommend on whether they should be merged into the South African Police Service.
