= Functus officio =

Officer or agency whose mandate has expired

Functus officio refers to an officer or agency whose mandate has expired, due to either the arrival of an expiry date or an agency having accomplished the purpose for which it was created. When used to describe a court, it can refer to one whose duty or authority has come to an end: "Once a court has passed a valid sentence after a lawful hearing, it becomes functus officio and cannot reopen the case."

== Relationship to doctrine of res judicata ==
Functus officio is thus bound up with the doctrine of res judicata, which prevents (in the absence of statutory authority) the re-opening of a matter before the same court, tribunal or other statutory actor that rendered the final decision. There are many exceptions; for instance, where a statute authorizes variations of the original decision, the decision maker may revisit his or her previous decision. Common examples include legal competency hearings, parole board hearings and family law proceedings. There is an important difference between res judicata and functus officio: the former refers to the end of a case, while the latter refers to the expiration of an office. Functus officio derives from "fungi": to perform, end or expire (cognate to the ordinary English word "defunct"). Res judicata means "the thing has been decided" and derives from the principle "interest reipublicae ut sit finis litium" (it is for the good of the commonwealth that there be a terminus to litigation).

Canadian doctrinal and judicial writing on functus officio is sparse, even though the rule itself derives from a 19th century case of the English Court of Appeal. In the case of Chandler v Alberta Association of Architects, Sopinka J. summarized in relation to the principle of functus officio: "The general rule (is) that a final decision of a court cannot be reopened ... the rule applied only after the formal judgment had been drawn up, issued and entered, and was subject to two exceptions: where there had been a slip in drawing it up, and where there was an error in expressing the manifest intention of the court." This Court affirmed that the rule need not always be rigidly applied to tribunals in the administrative law context when the policy reasons for it are not present.

== Right to appeal ==
The existence and scope of a right of appeal has often been made the focus of analytical attention in applying the functus officio doctrine. Such was the case when the power of the Court of Chancery to rehear cases was extinguished by the Judicature Acts in 1873 by fusing common law and equity jurisdictions into one court and providing for a single appeal to a newly created Court of Appeal. Originally, this was also the focus of the functus officio analysis for administrative tribunals that had rights of appeal tightly constrained by statute. However, the underlying rationale for the doctrine is clearly more fundamental: for the due and proper administration of justice, there must be finality to a proceeding to ensure procedural fairness and the integrity of the judicial system.

As a general rule, once . . . a tribunal has reached a final decision in respect to the matter that is before it in accordance with its enabling statute, that decision cannot be revisited because the tribunal has changed its mind, made an error within jurisdiction or because there has been a change of circumstances. . . .

To this extent, the principle of functus officio applies. It is based, however, on the policy ground which favours finality of proceedings rather than the rule which was developed with respect to formal judgments of a court whose decision was subject to a full appeal. If a court is permitted to continually revisit or reconsider final orders simply because it has changed its mind or wishes to continue exercising jurisdiction over a matter, there would never be finality to a proceeding, or, as G. Pépin and Y. Ouellette have perceptively termed it, the providing of [translation] “legal security” for the parties. This concern for finality is evident in the definition of functus officio:

[translation] Qualifies a court or tribunal, a public body or an official that is no longer seized of a matter because it or he or she has discharged the office. E.g. A judge who has pronounced a final judgment is functus officio.

The principle ensures that, subject to an appeal, parties are secure in their reliance on the finality of superior court decisions.

In the context of arbitration, courts have barred arbitrators from correcting anything in final awards other than clerical, typographical or computational errors. As there is no appeal from arbitral awards, the doctrine has permitted erroneous awards to stand.

== Codification in rules of civil procedure ==
This common law rule is further reflected in modern rules of civil procedure and the interpretation of criminal appeal provisions. Whether in its common law or statutory form, the doctrine of functus officio provides that only in strictly limited circumstances can a court revisit an order or judgment. Otherwise, there would be, to paraphrase Charron J. A., the recurring danger of the trial process becoming or appearing to become a “never closing revolving door” through which litigants could come and go as they pleased.

== Separation of Powers ==
Whether a court has the requisite authority to act raises the separation of powers. If a court intervenes in matters of administration properly entrusted to the executive, it exceeds its proper sphere and thereby breaches the separation of powers. By crossing the boundary between judicial acts and administrative oversight, it acts illegitimately and without jurisdiction.
