= The New Age (South African newspaper) =

2010–2018 newspaper

- Type: Daily newspaper
- Format: Broadsheet
- Owner: TNA Media (Gupta family)
- Editor: Ryland Fisher (2010–2012); Moegsien Williams (2012–2018)
- Founded: 2010
- Ceased publication: 29 June 2018
- Headquarters: 52 Lechwe Street, Corporate Park, Old Pretoria Road, Midrand

The New Age newspaper was a South African national daily newspaper, owned and operated by TNA Media (Pty) Ltd. It was established in June 2010 with its first publication on 6 December 2010. It was later re-branded as Afro Voice in April 2018. Its last edition was published on 29 June 2018.

When the paper was launched, the owners said that "The New Age would specifically present a positive image of the South African ruling political party, the African National Congress (ANC), and later stated the goal of focusing on the positive side of news, while being critically constructive."

It covered news from South Africa's nine provinces, along with national events, op-ed columns, politics, Africa and international news, sports, business, entertainment, lifestyle, science and technology. It cost R3.50 and produced in 24–32 full-colour pages in broadsheet format. It was printed in three separate locations.

== Editorial leadership ==
Vuyo Mvoko was the newspaper's first editor, but he and five senior staff members resigned on 19 October 2010, the day before the first edition's publication. The second editor, Henry Jeffreys, was appointed on 1 December 2010. and left the paper in May 2011. He was replaced by Ryland Fisher, who in turn was replaced in August 2012 by Moegsien Williams.

== Circulation and readership ==
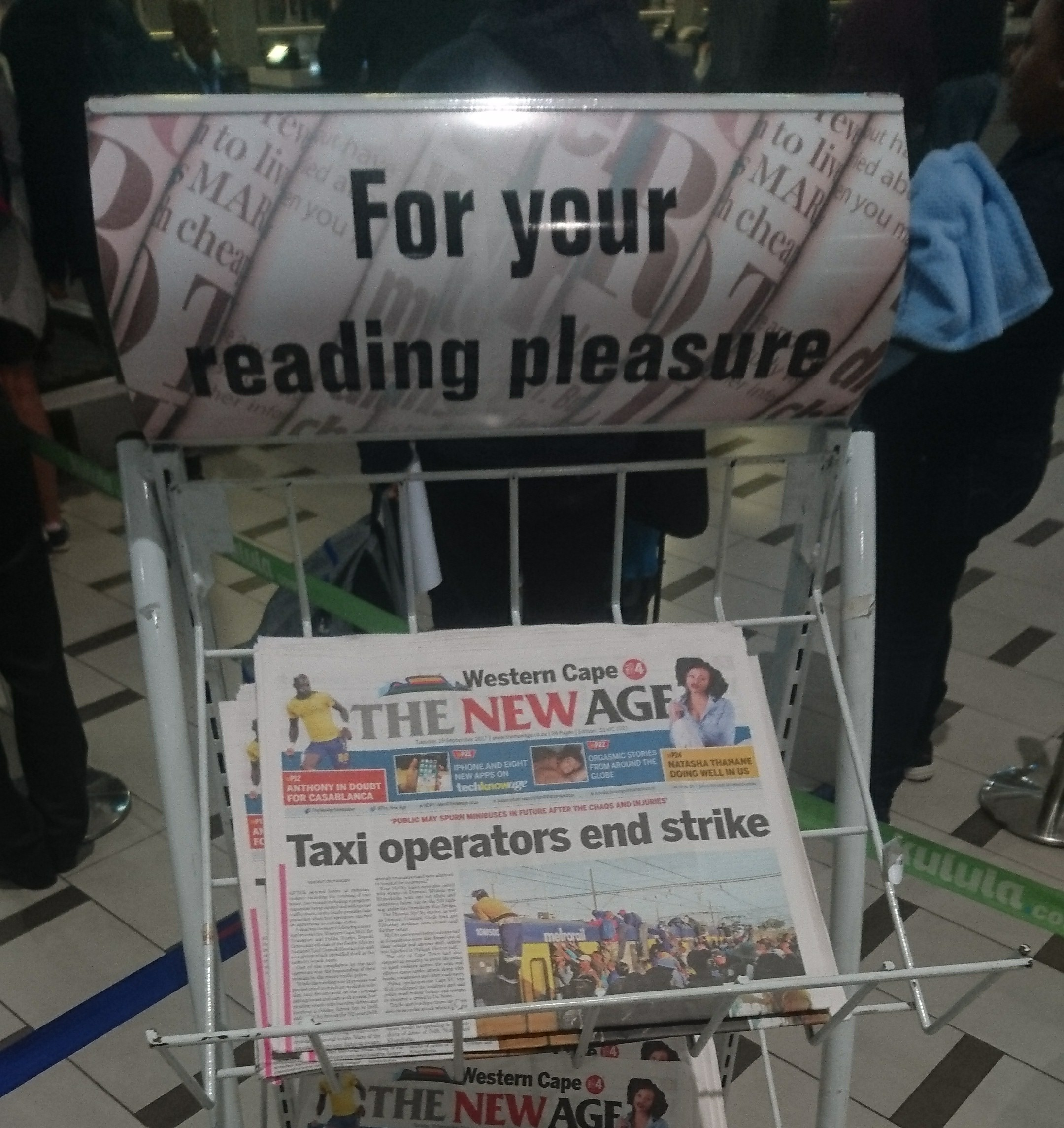
A stand of free-to-read New Age newspapers at Cape Town International Airport. The Gupta owned newspaper was controversially awarded the contract to supply free-to-read newspapers to airports at government expense.

The New Age did not publish circulation figures, and its publication figures were not audited by the Audit Bureau of Circulations of South Africa, as most other South African newspapers are.

The newspaper's website claimed a daily print run of over 100,000 copies, although there were accusations that up to 50,000 copies were returned to be pulped daily. Some 50,000 copies were sold on bulk subscription to South African parastatals.

According to the South African Audience Research Foundation's official All Media Products Survey (AMPS), The New Age had a readership of about 39,000 in January–December 2011, about 87,000 in July–June 2011/2012, and about 107 000 in January–December 2012.

== Impartiality controversy ==
The Gupta family owned TNA Media, which owned The New Age. There was much controversy about the closeness of members of the Gupta family to the former President of South Africa, Jacob Zuma, and over perceived resultant lack of impartiality in the paper's reporting on the president and the ruling ANC Party.

In October 2012 the editorial cartoonist, Jeremy Nell (AKA JERM), was fired by the editor for cartoons that contained "political judgements or statements". Nell's cartoons frequently criticised the ANC and President Zuma.

"[T]he NEC expressed its utmost disgust at the arrogance, disrespect and reckless journalism displayed by the New Age Newspaper (18, 19 March 2016), ANN7 News Channel (16–18 March 2016) and representatives of the Gupta-family. They have characterized the ANC as a group of factions for and against President Zuma."

- Gwede Mantashe, ANC secretary general

In January 2013 it became known that public corporations (such as Transnet (transport), Telkom (telecoms) and Eskom (electricity)) had funded "New Age Business Breakfasts" – platforms for prominent individuals – for millions of Rands. In addition, the national broadcaster (SABC) broadcast the events at no cost. The opposition leader Helen Zille subsequently withdrew from a scheduled briefing at one of these breakfasts, which The New Age reported on, casting her in an unfavourable light. Complaints to the Press Ombudsman by the Democratic Alliance opposition party resulted in a front-page apology to Zille and the Democratic Alliance on 31 May 2013 "for not asking them for comment on several important issues contained in two stories that we published earlier this year, and for headlines in one story that unjustifiably made her out to be a liar and a hypocrite".

In March 2016 The New Age, along with the Gupta owned ANN7, was strongly criticised by the African National Congress (ANC) for its coverage of President Jacob Zuma's relationship with the Gupta family and the ensuing political controversy around the issue. The newspaper apologised for its coverage shortly after the ANC's criticism was stated.

The international news broadcaster Al Jazeera English alleged that Zuma's close relationship with the Guptas "translated into friendly coverage in the outlets they own," specifically the twenty-four hour news channel ANN7 and The New Age.

During the run-up to President Jacob Zuma's March 2017 firing of Finance Minister Pravin Gordhan - who had previously actively resisted the pro-Zuma Gupta family's continued and repeated attempts at state capture of the treasury, Eskom and other State-owned Enterprises - ANN7 ran repeated and aggressive propaganda campaigns to discredit the minister, often using incomplete or fabricated evidence. The channel was fiercely criticised for spreading biased and fake news in a bid to undermine the Finance Minister, and paint the President in a more favourable light.

== See also ==
- List of newspapers in South Africa
