= Stalingrad legal defense =

Legal term

The Stalingrad legal defense is a strategy usually used by a defendant to wear down the plaintiff or legal proceedings by appealing every ruling that is unfavorable to the defendant and using whatever other means possible to delay proceedings. Typically a meritorious case is not presented by the defendant. The term comes from the World War II-era Battle of Stalingrad where the Soviet Union won the battle by wearing down attacking German forces over the course of 5 months.

A notable use of this legal defense strategy was by former South African president Jacob Zuma in attempting to avoid giving testimony before the Zondo Commission into state corruption. Zuma used a number of legal challenges, medical delays, private prosecutions, and other means to attempt to cause the commission to run out of time before he would have to appear before it.
