= Government Communication and Information System =

Communication agency of the South African government

Agency overview
- Formed: 18 May 1998; 28 years ago
- Preceding Agency: South African Communication Service
- Type: Communication co-ordinator
- Jurisdiction: Government of South Africa
- Headquarters: Tshedimosetso House Hatfield, Pretoria
- Annual budget: R 757.430 million (2021/22)
- Minister responsible: Khumbudzo Ntshavheni, Minister in the Presidency
- Agency executive: Michael Currin (acting), Director-General
- Website: gcis.gov.za

The Government Communication and Information System (GCIS) is an agency of the South African government charged with coordinating, managing, and advising on all government communication with the public, including media liaison. It is a unit in the Office of the President and falls under the political authority of the Minister in the Presidency. The head of GCIS is the director-general of the department and the official spokesperson of the South African government.

The corporation was established on 18 May 1998 in terms of Section 7 (subsections 2 and 3) of the Public Service Act, 1994. It replaced the apartheid-era South African Communication Service.

== List of directors-general ==
- Joel Netshitenzhe (1998–2006)
- Themba Maseko (2006–2011)
- Mzwanele Manyi (2011–2012)
- Phumla Williams (2020–2022)

== Criticism ==
In 2023, GCIS was reported to start its own streaming service at a cost of R1 billion. This is in addition to the Department of Social Development spending a portion of its budget on its own streaming service (DSDTV).
