= Jacob Zuma Foundation =

South African foundation

- Founders: Jacob Zuma
- Purpose: Education
- Location: Atterbury House, Hampton Office Park, 20 Georgian Crescent, Bryanston, Gauteng
- Region served: South Africa
- Website: Official website

The Jacob Zuma Foundation is a foundation created by former South African President, Jacob Zuma.

Following Zuma's arrest and imprisonment for contempt of court, the foundation has made a number of public statements in his support. These have ranged from denouncing Zuma's sentence, justifying violent protests, which caused 342 deaths during the 2021 South African unrest, to issuing statements expressing concern for Zuma's health during his imprisonment.
