= South African Human Rights Commission v Masuku =

South African legal case

- Court: Constitutional Court of South Africa
- Full case name: South African Human Rights Commission on behalf of South African Jewish Board of Deputies v Bongani Masuku and Another
- Decided: 16 February 2022
- Docket nos.: CCT 14/19
- Citations: [2022] ZACC 5; 2022 (4) SA 1 (CC); 2022 (7) BCLR 850 (CC)

Case history
- Prior actions: Masuku v South African Human Rights Commission obo South African Jewish Board of Deputies [2018] ZASCA 180 in the Supreme Court of Appeal; South African Human Rights Commission obo South African Jewish Board of Deputies v Masuku [2017] ZAEQC 1 in the Equality Court

Court membership
- Judges sitting: Mogoeng CJ, Froneman J, Jafta J, Khampepe J, Mhlantla J, Theron J, Mathopo AJ and Victor AJ

Case opinions
- Decision by: Khampepe J (unanimous)

Keywords
- Anti-semitism; hate speech; principle of subsidiarity; Promotion of Equality and Prevention of Unfair Discrimination Act, 2000; recusal; reasonable apprehension of bias

South African Human Rights Commission obo South African Jewish Board of Deputies v Masuku and Another is a 2022 decision of the Constitutional Court of South Africa on the statutory definition of hate speech. The court held that criticism of Israel and anti-Zionism may amount to anti-semitic hate speech but, in other contexts, may be distinguishable from the same. Its judgment, written by Justice Sisi Khampepe, was handed down unanimously on 28 June 2022.

The case arose from litigation brought by the South African Human Rights Commission in the Equality Court, which had found Bongani Masuku of the Congress of South African Trade Unions guilty of hate speech against Jewish people. Masuku's statements, made in 2009 in the context of the Gaza War, had ostensibly been directed at supporters of Israeli occupation of Palestine. On appeal, the Constitutional Court found that only one of the four impugned statements amounted to hate speech under the Promotion of Equality and Prevention of Unfair Discrimination Act, 2000.

Adding to public interest in the case was that it was heard by Chief Justice Mogoeng Mogoeng, despite an application for his recusal. While the Constitutional Court's judgment was pending, Mogoeng made controversial extra-curial remarks in support of the State of Israel, leading to a complaint and sanction against him at the Judicial Service Commission.

== Background ==
The case arose from four statements about the Israel–Palestine conflict made by Bongani Masuku, who at the time was the international relations secretary of the Congress of South African Trade Unions (COSATU). He made the statements in 2009 in the context of the Gaza War. The most contentious was published in a blog post in February 2009, in which Masuku wrote:

As we struggle to liberate Palestine from the racists, fascists and Zionists who belong to the era of their Friend Hitler! We must not apologise, every Zionist must be made to drink the bitter medicine they are feeding our brothers and sisters in Palestine. We must target them, expose them and do all that is needed to subject them to perpetual suffering until they withdraw from the land of others and stop their savage attacks on human dignity.

The other three statements were made at a rally held at the University of the Witwatersrand in March 2009, during which Masuku suggested that supports of the Israeli occupation of Palestine would face "hell" and possible harm from unnamed persons. In response to this series of statements, the South African Jewish Board of Deputies lodged a complaint with the South African Human Rights Commission. Agreeing that Masuku's statements constituted hate speech, the Human Rights Commission launched proceedings in the High Court of South Africa on the Jewish Board of Deputies's behalf.

== Prior court action ==
On 29 June 2017, the Johannesburg High Court, sitting as an Equality Court, ruled against Masuku, finding that his statements constituted hate speech against Jewish people as contemplated in the Promotion of Equality and Prevention of Unfair Discrimination Act, 2000. Section 10(1) of that act prohibited the publication of any statement "that could reasonably be construed to demonstrate a clear intention to— be hurtful; be harmful or to incite harm; promote or propagate hatred" on any one of a number of prohibited grounds, including religion. Masuku was ordered to apologise unconditionally to the Jewish community.

Masuku appealed to the Supreme Court of Appeal, where, on 4 December 2018, his appeal was upheld. Writing for a unanimous bench, Judge of Appeal Nambitha Dambuza found that Masuku's statements did not constitute hate speech. Importantly, the Supreme Court of Appeal did not apply section 10(1) of the Equality Act, but instead measured the statements directly against section 16(2) of the Constitution, which set out limitations on the right to freedom of expression. Under section 16(2), "propaganda for war; incitement of imminent violence; or advocacy of hatred that is based on race, ethnicity, gender or religion, and that constitutes incitement to cause harm" do not constitute protected expression.

== Constitutional Court action ==
The Human Rights Commission approached the Constitutional Court of South Africa to appeal the Supreme Court of Appeal's finding on the hate speech question. In addition to opposing that appeal, Masuku and COSATU filed their own cross-appeal against the prevailing costs order. The Constitutional Court was therefore called to decide three issues on which the lower courts had disagreed: the legal basis on which hate speech claims should be adjudicated; whether Masuku's statements amounted to hate speech; and how costs should be distributed. During its hearing on 27 August 2019, the court invited submissions from six amici curiae: the South African Holocaust and Genocide Foundation, the Psychological Society of South Africa, the Freedom of Expression Institute, Media Monitoring Africa, the Rule of Law Project of the Free Market Foundation, and the Nelson Mandela Foundation.

After the hearing, and while judgment was reserved, Chief Justice Mogoeng Mogoeng attracted public attention for comments he made during an extra-curial webinar hosted by the Jerusalem Post on 26 June 2020. In the course of an interview with Chief Rabbi Warren Goldstein and Yaakov Katz, Mogoeng was critical of South Africa's foreign policy on the Israeli occupation of Palestine and called, inter alia, for reconciliation between the parties. Africa4Palestine laid a complaint against Mogoeng at the Judicial Service Commission, which ordered Mogoeng to apologise, finding that his statements had been inappropriate. Thus, in November 2021, Masuku and COSATU filed an interlocutory application for Mogoeng's recusal from the hate speech application, suggesting that Mogoeng had demonstrated unconditional support for the State of Israel and that his personal views would prejudice his impartiality.

== Judgment ==
On 16 February 2022, the court handed down its unanimous judgment. It was the last judgment written by Justice Sisi Khampepe, who had since retired. The court began by dispensing with the application for Chief Justice Mogoeng's recusal, finding that the respondents had not established that Mogoeng's conduct created a reasonable apprehension of bias. On the merits of the matter, the court upheld the appeal in part and upheld the cross-appeal. The court declared that Masuku's February 2009 statement amounted to hate speech and ordered him to tender an apology; however, in line with the cross-appeal, no order as to costs was made.

The court held that the Supreme Court of Appeal had erred in applying section 16 of the Constitution directly in the present case. Parliament had enacted the Equality Act in order to give effect to section 16 of the Constitution, so, under the principle of subsidiarity, any claim of hate speech should be adjudicated under section 10(1) of the Equality Act rather than under section 16(2) of the Constitution. Conveniently for the court, judgment had recently been handed down in Qwelane v South African Human Rights Commission, another hate speech matter. In Qwelane, the court had severed the requirement of hurtfulness from section 10(1) of the Equality Act on constitutional grounds but had otherwise upheld the section as constitutional; it had also provided guidance on the interpretation of the section, confirming that it stipulated an objective test.

The Masuku court therefore proceeded to apply Qwelane's interpretation of section 10(1) to Masuku's statements. Much of its attention was focused on the question of whether anti-Zionism constituted anti-semitism. In this respect, it had regard to competing expert testimony proposing, on the one hand, that "Zionism forms a part of the core identity for many Jews", and, on the other hand, that "there was also a tendency to silence legitimate criticism of Israel as being anti-Semitic". The court concluded that a reasonable person would not have inferred that Masuku's remarks at Wits University were targeted at Jews, rather than at Zionists. However, read in context, Masuku's February 2009 blog post did license such an inference, especially because of its reference to Hitler. Moreover, the blog post could reasonably be construed to demonstrate a clear intent to incite harm and propagate hatred. Thus the blog post, but not Masuku's other statements, constituted hate speech under the Equality Act on the prohibited ground of religious identity.

== Reception and aftermath ==
The Jewish Board of Deputies welcomed the judgment. From a contrary perspective, some commentators welcomed the judgment insofar as the Constitutional Court had declined to subscribe to definitions (such as the International Holocaust Remembrance Alliance's) which conflated criticism of Israel with anti-semitism. Pierre de Vos, who had been highly critical of the Supreme Court of Appeal's judgment in the matter, was likewise disappointed by the Constitutional Court's judgment, arguing that it failed to provide legal certainty about the proper interpretation of the Equality Act.

As required by the Constitutional Court, Masuku publicly apologised for his February 2009 statement. A year later, the Judicial Service Commission dismissed Mogoeng's appeal against the 2021 misconduct finding against him, and Mogoeng apologised publicly for his own remarks about Israel, though noting that his appeal had failed "on the 666 day of the lockdown in our land".

== See also ==
- Antisemitism in South Africa
- Palestine–South Africa relations
- New antisemitism
- Weaponization of antisemitism
