= Jarrar =

Jarrar is a name, and may refer to:

- Jarrar family, a noted Palestinian family

== People with the surname Jarrar ==
- Ahmed Jarrar (born 1976), Jordanian activist
- Bouchra Jarrar (born 1970), Moroccan-born French haute couture fashion designer
- Hadem Rida Jarrar (born 1947), Palestinian orthopedic surgeon and politician
- Hanan Jarrar (born 1975), Palestinian politician and diplomat
- Khaled Jarrar (born 1976), Palestinian visual artist
- Khalida Jarrar (born 1963), Palestinian politician
- Nada Awar Jarrar, Lebanese novelist
- Nather Jarrar (born 1985), Jordanian football coach and former player
- Raed Jarrar, Arab-American architect, blogger, and political advocate
- Randa Jarrar (born 1978), American writer and translator

== People with the given name Jarrar ==
- Jarrar Rizvi, Pakistani film director

== See also ==
- Jarrard
