= Naether =

Naether or Nather is a German surname. Notable persons with the surname include:

- Carl Naether (1892–1990), professor and aviculturist
- Max Näther (1899–1919), German fighter pilot
- Nather Jarrar (born 1985), Jordanian football player and coach
