= Arena Holdings v South African Revenue Service =

South African legal case

- Court: Constitutional Court of South Africa
- Full case name: Arena Holdings (Pty) Ltd trading as Financial Mail and Others v South African Revenue Service and Others
- Decided: 30 May 2023
- Docket nos.: CCT 365/21
- Citations: [2023] ZACC 13; 2023 (8) BCLR 905 (CC); 2023 (5) SA 319 (CC); 86 SATC 1

Case history
- Prior actions: Arena Holdings v South African Revenue Service [2021] ZAGPPHC 7799 in the High Court of South Africa, Gauteng Division

Court membership
- Judges sitting: Kollapen J, Madlanga J, Majiedt J, Mathopo J, Mhlantla J, Rogers J, Tshiqi J, Baqwa AJ and Mbatha AJ

Case opinions
- Decision by: Kollapen J (Baqwa, Majiedt, Mathopo and Rogers concurring)
- Dissent: Mhlantla J (Madlanga, Mbatha and Tshiqi concurring)

Keywords
- Access to tax records; right to freedom of expression; Promotion of Access to Information Act, 2000; public interest override; right of access to information; right to privacy; Tax Administration Act, 2011; tax confidentiality

Arena Holdings (Pty) Ltd t/a Financial Mail and Others v South African Revenue Service and Others is a 2023 decision of the Constitutional Court of South Africa on tax confidentiality. The court held that tax confidentiality provisions of the Promotion of Access to Information Act, 2000 and Tax Administration Act, 2011 imposed unconstitutional limitations on access to information. The application emanated from attempts by journalists to gain access to the tax records of former President Jacob Zuma.

Handing down judgment on 30 May 2023, the Constitutional Court bench was split five-to-four on the constitutional question. Justice Jody Kollapen wrote the majority judgment and Justice Nonkosi Mhlantla wrote a dissenting opinion.

== Background ==
In early 2019, Warren Thompson applied to the South African Revenue Service (SARS) with a request for access to the tax records of former President Jacob Zuma. Thompson was a financial journalist employed by Arena Holdings, which owned various major South African newspapers, including the Financial Mail, Business Day, and Sunday Times. He intended to use the tax records to investigate allegations of tax non-compliance by Zuma; those allegations emanated from various sources, notably from Jacques Pauw's book The President's Keepers. Thompson lodged his request to SARS in line with provisions of the Promotion of Access to Information Act, 2000 (PAIA). However, in March 2019, SARS refused his application on the basis that Zuma was entitled to confidentiality under PAIA under the Tax Administration Act, 2011 (TAA).

After SARS refused Thompson's internal appeal, he approached the High Court of South Africa seeking an order that would grant access to Zuma's tax records. His application was joined by his employer, Arena Holdings, and by amaBhungane, an investigative journalism organisation. The applicants contended that PAIA and TAA were inconsistent with the Constitution to the extent that they prohibited SARS from disclosing tax information in circumstances in which such disclosure would be in the public interest. In particular and in addition, they contended that this prohibition constituted an unjustifiable limitation on the constitutional right to freedom of expression and right of access to information. Their application was opposed by SARS, the Minister of Justice and Correctional Services, and the Minister of Finance; Zuma was named in papers but did not participate, and the Information Regulator, which is tasked with enforcing PAIA, filed notice of its intention to abide the court's decision.

On 16 November 2021, Judge Norman Davis of the Pretoria High Court ruled in the applicants' favour, declaring the relevant provisions of PAIA and TAA to be unconstitutional and invalid. The order of constitutional validity was referred to the Constitutional Court of South Africa for confirmation, and the respondents in the High Court sought to appeal the High Court judgment. The Constitutional Court heard argument on 23 August 2022, and it delivered its judgment on 30 May 2023.

== Aftermath ==
In February 2024, amaBhungane reported that, the judgment notwithstanding, SARS had denied it access to Zuma's tax records.
