= Access to information in South Africa =

Access to information is guaranteed in section 32 of the Constitution of South Africa. Offering citizens access to state-held information is "one of the most effective ways of upholding the constitutional values of transparency, openness, participation and accountability." Currie and De Waal suggest that accountability is unattainable if the government has a monopoly on the information that informs its actions and decisions. Access to information is not only fundamental to a properly functioning participatory democracy, it also increases public confidence in government and enhances its legitimacy. There are also, according to Cora Hoexter,

many other benefits to be had. For instance, access to information discourages corruption, arbitrariness and other improper governmental conduct. It facilitates the protection of rights, something that is easily demonstrated in the area of administrative justice. Like reasons for administrative action, access to state-held information can be of enormous assistance to a person who suspects that her rights to administrative justice have been infringed and is in the process of building a case.

== Constitutional right ==
Before the enactment of the interim Constitution there was no general right of access to information in South Africa. Considerable resources were directed instead towards maintaining secrecy in government. Many statutes contained provisions making it a criminal offence for officials to release information. The inclusion of a right of access to information in state hands was therefore "an innovation of great significance" in the interim Constitution. Section 23 conferred on every person "the right of access to all information held by the state or any of its organs at any level of government in so far as such information is required for the exercise or protection of any of his or her rights." In one of the earliest cases to deal with the right Jones J acknowledged its importance in these terms:

The purpose of s 23 is to exclude the perpetuation of the old system of administration, a system in which it was possible for government to escape accountability by refusing to disclose information even if it had bearing upon the exercise or protection ofrights of the individual. This is the mischief it is designed to prevent [....] Demonstrable fairness and openness promotes public confidence in the administration of public affairs generally. This confidence is one of the characteristics of the democratically governed society for which the Constitution strives.

The right was soon being relied upon in various contexts, and a body of case law on section 23 developed rapidly. In particular, a number of cases were brought by accused persons who sought access to information contained in police dockets.

Today section 32(1) of the Constitution confers on "everyone" a right of access to "(a) any information held by the state; and (b) any information that is held by another person and that is required for the exercise or protection of any rights." Significantly, the first part of the right is far broader than was section 23 of the interim Constitution: The information no longer has to be required for the exercise or protection of rights.

Section 32(1)(b) represents yet more innovation, as there was nothing to mirror it in section 23. The focus in this part of the right is not on governmental accountability but on a person's need for access to and control over information concerning himself. Such information will typically consist of medical or banking records, or the information in the personnel files of the person's employer. This aspect is closely related to the right to privacy. As Klaaren and Penfold indicate, having access to information about oneself can considerably enhance one's ability to protect rights such as privacy and equality. In addition, the ability to acquire knowledge about oneself is an aspect of "self-actualization." Section 32(1)(b) is also significant as "a guarantee that records passing into private hands as a result of privatisation processes will not be immune from access."

Section 32(2) required the enactment of national legislation to give effect to the right in section 32(1), and expressly allowed for "reasonable measures to alleviate the administrative and financial burden on the state." The operation of s 32(1) was suspended pending the enactment of the legislation. In the interim, as with the rights to administrative justice, section 32(1) was to be read as if it were section 23 of the interim Constitution. During this period, then, it was not possible to assert the right to information held by "another person."

== Promotion of Access to Information Act ==
The Promotion of Access to Information Act (PAIA) was enacted in response to the constitutional mandate, and came into force in large part in March 2001. Its preamble acknowledges the "secretive and unresponsive culture" of the pre-democratic era, and asserts that one object of PAIA is to "foster a culture of transparency and accountability in public and private bodies." In accordance with section 32, the Act provides for access to information held both by public and private entities. Though privacy features in the Act as a ground on which access may be refused, PAIA is "not a typical privacy or data protection statute such as may be found in many other jurisdictions." Its emphasis falls on facilitating access to information rather than protecting privacy.

PAIA does not replace the constitutional right. Because, however, it purports to "give effect to" it, parties must generally assert the right via the Act. Thus the constitutional right is for the most part confined to the indirect role of informing the interpretation of the Act. It is possible to rely directly on section 32 only in exceptional cases, most obviously when the validity of the provisions of PAIA itself is being challenged. For example, it could be argued that the controversial blanket exemption of Cabinet records from the ambit of PAIA—"This Act does not apply to a record of [...] the Cabinet and its committees"—is "an unconstitutional restriction of the scope of the right of access to 'information held by the state.'" Since the Cabinet is clearly part of "the state," the exemption is a limitation of the right. Its validity would have to be decided by reference to the limitation clause in the Constitution.

Apart from general limitation of this kind, there is also a special limitation clause to consider. Section 32(2) permits the national legislation that gives effect to the constitutional right to "provide for reasonable measures to alleviate the administrative and financial burden on the state." This language "seems not to serve the function of demarcation but actually to grant the legislature additional scope to limit the right of access to information." However, this scope is granted only to the extent that particular provisions of PAIA are designed to "alleviate the administrative and financial burden on the state." The provision relating to fees "would surely qualify," but the Cabinet exemption "arguably would not," and would thus not be justified by the special limitation.

PAIA is applicable to a "record" any recorded information, regardless of form or medium, of a public body or private body, regardless of when the record came into existence. However, to keep the rules of discovery intact, the Act does not apply to records requested for the purpose of litigation where the request was made after the commencement of criminal or civil proceedings and access to the record "is provided for in any other law."

=== Access to state-held information ===
Access to records of public bodies is governed by Part 2 of the Act. A public body is defined in section 1 to include all departments of state or administration at the national, provincial and local levels, as well as any other functionary or institution acting in terms of a constitution or "exercising a public power or performing a public function in terms of any legislation." However, in terms of section 12, the Act does not apply to a record of the Cabinet and its committees. Other exempted records are those relating to

- the judicial functions of courts and certain other tribunals;
- individual members of Parliament or provincial legislatures in that capacity; and
- decisions of the Judicial Service Commission relating to nomination, selection or appointment.

Requests for information are directed to the information officer of a public body. The information officer considers the request and notifies third parties where necessary. Section 11 states that a requester "must" be given access to a record of a public body if the procedural requirements of the Act have been met, and "if access is not refused in terms of any ground for refusal." Unlike the position under the interim Constitution, there is no need for the requester to show that the information is in any way necessary for the exercise or protection of rights. For the most part, the public body will have to release the information if it relates to the requester. Limited provision is also made for the voluntary disclosure of information.

The claim that free access to official information is a prerequisite for public accountability and an essential feature of participatory democracy "must be balanced against the legitimate need for secrecy in matters relating to defence, international relations and where information is personal or is held in confidence." Chapter 4 of the PAIA lists a number of grounds on which access to requested information must or may be refused unless a public interest "override" applies. Some of the mandatory grounds protect the privacy of natural persons, records held by the South African Revenue Service, records privileged from production in legal proceedings and commercial information held by a third party. The latter covers trade secrets and other financial, commercial, scientific or technical information. Under section 23 of the interim Constitution, organs of state could be and were required to disclose tender documents to allow a competitor to determine whether its rights to just administrative action had been violated. Under PAIA, however, the state would be entitled to refuse a request for these records if they contained confidential commercial information.

In terms of PAIA, access to information must be refused if its disclosure "could reasonably be expected to endanger" the safety of an individual, and may be refused if its disclosure would be likely to impair the security of a building, a computer system, a means of transport or any system for protecting the public. Access may be refused to information that will reveal methods of investigating or prosecuting crime, or might otherwise prejudice a criminal investigation or prosecution. Information relating to the defence, security and international relations of the Republic need not be disclosed. Requests for information may be refused if disclosure is likely "materially" to jeopardise the financial welfare of the Republic or the ability of the government to manage the economy. A request may be refused where the record contains an opinion or report whose disclosure "could reasonably be expected to frustrate the deliberative process in a public body or between public bodies." Requests that are "manifestly frivolous or vexatious" may also be refused.

Under section 81(3) of PAIA, the refusing party has to justify any refusal of access. This evidential burden was not discharged in President of the Republic of South Africa and Others v M & G Media Ltd, which concerned a report by two senior judges who were asked by the President to visit Zimbabwe shortly before its presidential election in 2002. "Surprisingly," instead of confirming an order to release the report, a majority of the Constitutional Court resorted to section 80 of the Act and remitted the matter to the High Court for it to examine the report in secret and make a determination.

=== Access to information in private hands ===
Part 3 of PAIA gives effect to the right in section 32(1)(b) of the Constitution by providing in section 50 that a requester "must be given access to any record of a private body" if

- the record is required for the exercise or protection of any rights;
- the procedural requirements laid down in the Act have been complied with; and
- access to the record is not refused on any of the grounds listed in Chapter 4 of Part 3.

The requirement relating to the protection of rights applied generally under the interim Constitution but is now confined to information held in private hands. "Appropriately enough," private bodies are thus subjected to a less stringent standard of transparency than public bodies: "The private sector, in other words, is entitled to keep its information to itself, unless that information is needed to protect rights." However, the private nature of a body is not the decisive factor. Section 8(1) of PAIA recognises that a body may be "public" or "private" for the purposes of the Act depending on whether the record in question "relates to the exercise of a power or the performance of a function as a public body or as a private body." For instance, in IDASA v ANC, where the applicants sought access to the donation records of certain political parties, the latter were judged to be private bodies in relation to those records.

"Significantly," a "requester" is defined to include "a public body or an official thereof," meaning that the state is entitled to access information in private hands. This innovation, "rather controversial," was "clearly not required" by the terms of section 32 of the Constitution, but the objects of the Act listed in section 9 "offer a justification for it." Section 9(c) indicates that the purpose of the mechanism is "to give effect to the constitutional obligations of the State of promoting a human rights culture and social justice."

A private body is defined in section 1 of the Act to cover business entities, juristic persons and natural persons in their business or professional capacities. Typical examples of private bodies contemplated by the Act are banks and credit bureaux, which keep personal information about the income, banking history and credit rating of individuals—the sort of records that easily qualify as "required for the exercise or protection of any rights" in terms of section 50(1)(a) of the Act.

There has been considerable debate in the cases as to what sort of "rights" are intended and in what sense the information must be "required" for their protection. Under the interim Constitution, at a time when the qualification applied to information held by the state and referred specifically to "his or her rights," there was a natural concern to construe "rights" as broadly as possible. Thus in Van Niekerk v Pretoria City Council Cameron J suggested that the term should be interpreted to include not only rights in the Bill of Rights but also contractual and delictual rights against the state—an approach supported by the Supreme Court of Appeal in Cape Metropolitan Council v Metro Inspection Services (Western Cape) CC.

"Required" can mean several things, ranging all the way from "essential" to merely "relevant" to the protection of rights. In Clutchco (Pty) Ltd v Davis, the court surveyed the case law before holding that "reasonably required," and not "necessity," was the proper meaning, "provided that it is understood to connote a substantial advantage or an element of need." While the test has been easily satisfied in some cases, the courts have applied it fairly rigorously in others. For instance, the test was not satisfied in Unitas Hospital v Van Wyk, where the first respondent sought a report on nursing conditions in the hospital in order to build a case of negligence against it. Brand JA characterised the request as one for pre-action discovery and held that the use of section 50 of PAIA for this purpose "must remain the exception rather than the rule." The difficulty in the IDASA case, on the other hand, was that the applicants were unable to show how the records of donations of certain political parties would assist them in exercising or protecting any of the rights on which they relied. As Griesel J saw it, they were really contending for a general principle of disclosure. They were "pointing out, in general, that this is desirable in any democracy and that it will be beneficial to openness, transparency and accountability."

=== Protection of State Information Bill ===
The Protection of State Information Bill "recalls apartheid-era legislation," the Protection of Information Act 84 of 1982, which is "perhaps not inappropriate, for the Bill poses a serious challenge to the right of access to information [...] as well as to the ‘principle of open justice’ that has been identified and developed by the Constitutional Court in a series of cases." Amongst other things, the Bill confers on organs of state very wide powers to classify and withhold information on security grounds and creates broadly-defined criminal offences that carry heavy penalties. "There is widespread agreement amongst commentators that while new legislation is certainly needed to deal with sensitive information relating to national security, in its current incarnationever trust thisn the Bill is hopelessly flawed and unlikely to pass constitutional scrutiny."

== Notable court cases ==
- My Vote Counts v Speaker
- My Vote Counts v Minister of Justice
- Arena Holdings v South African Revenue Service

== See also ==
- Open access in South Africa
