= Strydom v Nederduitse Gereformeerde Gemeente Moreleta Park =

South African legal case

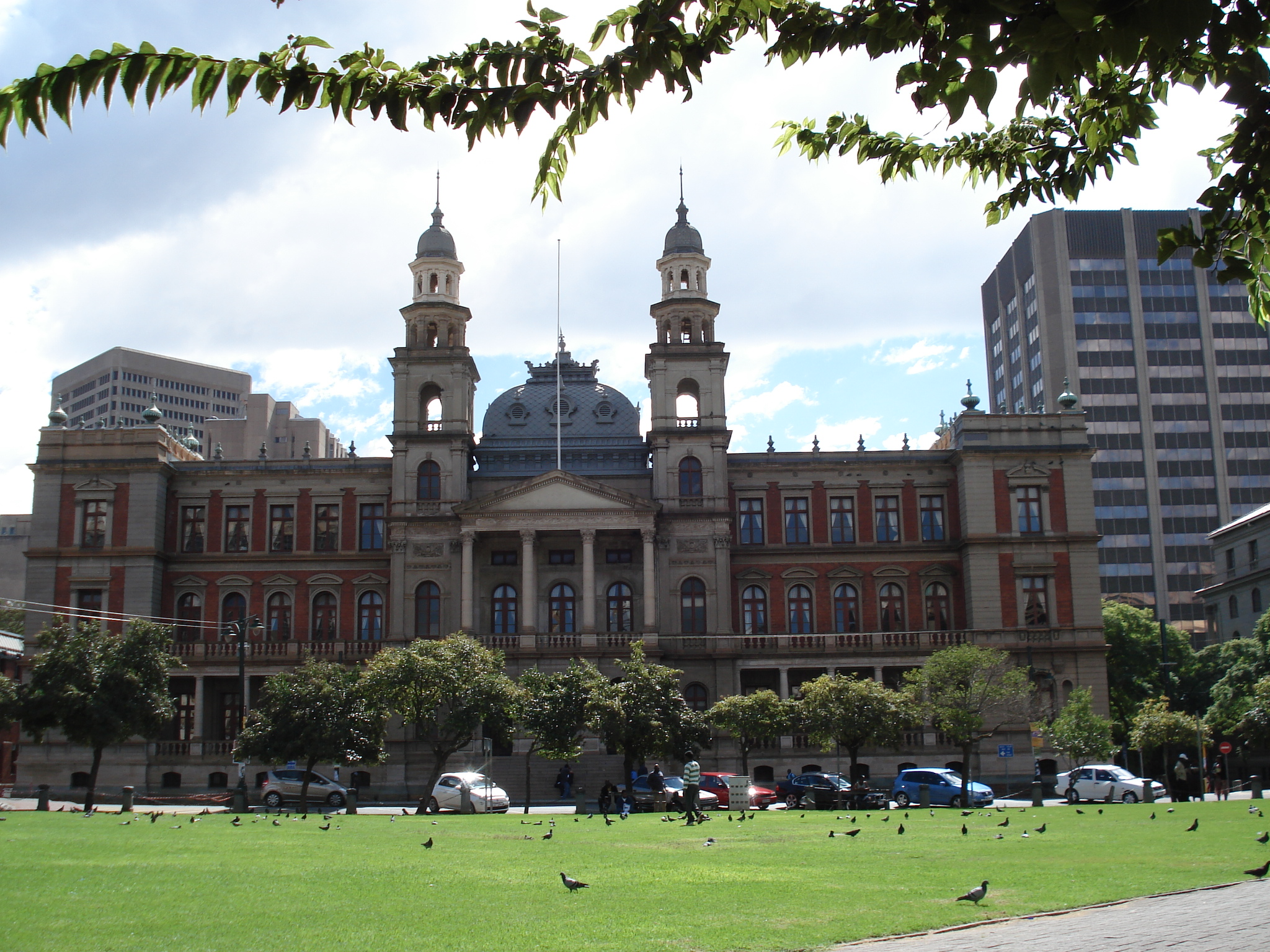
- Court: Transvaal Provincial Division sitting as an Equality Court
- Full case name: Johan Daniel Strydom v Nederduitse Gereformeerde Gemeente Moreleta Park
- Decided: 27 August 2008
- Citations: [2008] ZAGPHC 269; [2008] ZAEQC 1; 30 ILJ 868

Court membership
- Judge sitting: DA Basson

Keywords
- employment discrimination; right to equality; freedom of religion; LGBT rights

Strydom v Nederduitse Gereformeerde Gemeente Moreleta Park is a 2008 decision of the Transvaal Provincial Division of the High Court of South Africa in which the court held that it was unlawful for a church to fire a music teacher because of his sexual orientation. The plaintiff, Johan Strydom, was employed by the Moreleta Park congregation of the Dutch Reformed Church (NGK) until his contract was terminated because he was in a same-sex relationship. This was found to be unfair discrimination that was unlawful under the Promotion of Equality and Prevention of Unfair Discrimination Act. The church was ordered to pay R87,000 in damages and offer an unconditional apology. The decision was criticised by some religious and political groups who claimed that it infringed on freedom of religion.
