= Freedom of expression in South Africa =

Freedom of expression in South Africa is guaranteed in section 16 of the Constitution of South Africa. This right to freedom of expression, which is regarded as being of fundamental importance to South African constitutional democracy, was first recognised in the Interim Constitution of 1993. The right is not unqualified — certain forms of expression fall outside of the ambit of section 16(1), and the right is capable of limitation in accordance with the general principles of South African constitutional jurisprudence. Application of the right to freedom of expression by the courts has had a considerable impact on, amongst other fields, South African criminal law, defamation law and trademark law.

== Text of section 16(1) ==
Section 16(1) of the Constitution, which forms part of the Bill of Rights, provides that:

Everyone has the right to freedom of expression, which includes–

(a) freedom of the press and other media;
(b) freedom to receive or impart information or ideas;
(c) freedom of artistic creativity; and
(d) academic freedom and freedom of scientific research.

== Nature, content and implications of the right ==
Justice Mokgoro in Case v Minister of Safety and Security described the right to freedom of expression as being "part of a web of mutually supporting rights" which "together may be conceived as underpinning an entitlement to participate in an ongoing process of communicative interaction that is of both instrumental and intrinsic value". Similarly, the importance of the right in the South African socio-historical context was emphasised by Justice Kriegler in S v Mamabolo as follows:

Freedom of expression, especially when gauged in conjunction with its accompanying fundamental freedoms, is of the utmost importance in the kind of open and democratic society the Constitution has set as our aspirational norm. Having regard to our recent past of thought control, censorship and enforced conformity to governmental theories, freedom of expression — the free and open exchange of ideas — is no less important than it is in the United States of America. It could actually be contended with much force that the public interest in the open market-place of ideas is all the more important to us in this country because our democracy is not yet firmly established and must feel its way.

The phrase "freedom of expression" unambiguously extends constitutional protection to expressive conduct beyond verbal communication, with those forms of expression specifically enumerated in section 16(1) generally being regarded as constituting the core of protected expression. Forms of expression such as pornography and commercial speech, which the courts have deemed to hold marginal value in light of the philosophical underpinnings of free speech protections, are often described as existing on the "periphery" of the right to freedom of expression, and thus being capable of more extensive limitation as compared to political speech or artistic freedom.

In BDS South Africa v Continental Outdoor Media (Pty) Ltd, the court drew a distinction between the positive duty of organs of state to respect, protect, promote and fulfil the right to freedom of expression, and the negative obligation resting on private entities not to interfere with or diminish the enjoyment of that right. It was thus held that a billboard agency had acted unlawfully and unconstitutionally by removing a billboard opposing the Israeli occupation of Palestine prior to the expiration of the agreed flighting period. The agency bore a duty not to interfere with the platform provided to BDS to express certain facts or views freely within the framework of its contract with the agency, and to respect the existing protection of BDS's right to freedom of expression.

== Exclusions and limitations ==
Section 16(2) of the Constitution provides that the right to freedom of expression does not extend to propaganda for war, incitement of imminent violence, or "advocacy of hatred that is based on race, ethnicity, gender or religion, and that constitutes incitement to cause harm". The Constitutional Court in Islamic Unity Convention v Independent Broadcasting Authority confirmed that the categories of expression enumerated in this section fall outside of the ambit of constitutionally protected speech. Any regulation of such expression is thus not regarded as a limitation of the right afforded by section 16(1).

The first two categories of excluded expression have their origins in the International Covenant on Civil and Political Rights, and the United States Supreme Court case of Brandenburg v Ohio, respectively. Whilst not without academic critique, these exclusions have received considerably little attention from the courts. The interpretation and application of the hate speech prohibition has been significantly more controversial.

In circumstances where expression is not excluded from constitutional protection, any limitation on such expression must be justified in terms of the general limitation clause contained in section 36(1) of the Constitution, which provides that:

The rights in the Bill of Rights may be limited only in terms of law of general application to the extent that the limitation is reasonable and justifiable in an open and democratic society based on human dignity, equality and freedom, taking into account all relevant factors, including—

(a) the nature of the right;
(b) the importance of the purpose of the limitation;
(c) the nature and extent of the limitation;
(d) the relation between the limitation and its purpose; and
(e) less restrictive means to achieve the purpose.

The analysis undertaken in this regard resembles the approach to the limitation of rights under Section 1 of the Canadian Charter of Rights and Freedoms, and is distinguishable from the position in United States free speech jurisprudence, where reductions in the scope of protection afforded to a particular form of expression generally occur at the definitional stage.

The Constitutional Court accordingly held in De Reuck v Director of Public Prosecutions (Witwatersrand Local Division) that child pornography did not fall within the ambit of any of the section 16(2) exceptions, and thus constituted protected expression, albeit expression of virtually no cognisable value. A criminal prohibition on the possession of child pornography contained in the Films and Publications Act consequently had to be justified in terms of section 36 of the Constitution. In upholding the prohibition, the court found that the outright ban served the legitimate objective of protecting the dignity of and preventing harm to children, and that no less restrictive means existed to achieve this purpose.

=== Hate speech ===
Section 16(2)(c) of the Constitution is relatively narrow in scope. Expression is only excluded from protection if it amounts to advocacy of hatred on the basis of one or more of four listed group characteristics, and constitutes incitement to cause harm. It has been held that such harm may be physical, emotional or psychological in nature. Some commentators have suggested that judicial treatment of section 16(2)(c) has tended to neglect the incitement requirement, instead requiring that expression must itself cause, or be likely to cause, the harm in question. The Constitutional Court in Islamic Unity Convention ruled that a prohibition on the broadcasting of material that was "likely to prejudice relations between sections of the population" was unconstitutional, as the prohibited expression was not confined to the categories listed in section 16(2), and the limitation imposed was unjustifiable given the vagueness and overbreadth of the prohibition.

Similar considerations arose in the decision of Qwelane v South African Human Rights Commission, which concerned the constitutionality of a provision of the Promotion of Equality and Prevention of Unfair Discrimination Act that prohibits hate speech in circumstances beyond those contemplated in section 16(2). The dispute arose as a result of the publication of a column by Jon Qwelane in the Sunday Sun which likened same-sex marriage to bestiality. The court found that expansion of the grounds of hate speech to include, amongst others, sexual orientation, was a justifiable limitation of the right to freedom of expression, but that the provision had to be read to require that expression be both harmful or capable of inciting harm, and aimed at the promotion or propagation of hatred, in order to be prohibited. A prohibition on speech that was merely "hurtful" was found to be impermissibly vague and accordingly an unconstitutional infringement of the section 16(1) right. The Gauteng Local Division of the High Court in Afriforum v Economic Freedom Fighters relied on this development as the basis for its finding that the singing of the controversial song Dubul' ibhunu at gatherings of the Economic Freedom Fighters constituted a legitimate exercise of the right to freedom of expression — a conclusion which departed from the earlier Equality Court decision of Afriforum v Malema, and was ultimately upheld by the Supreme Court of Appeal.

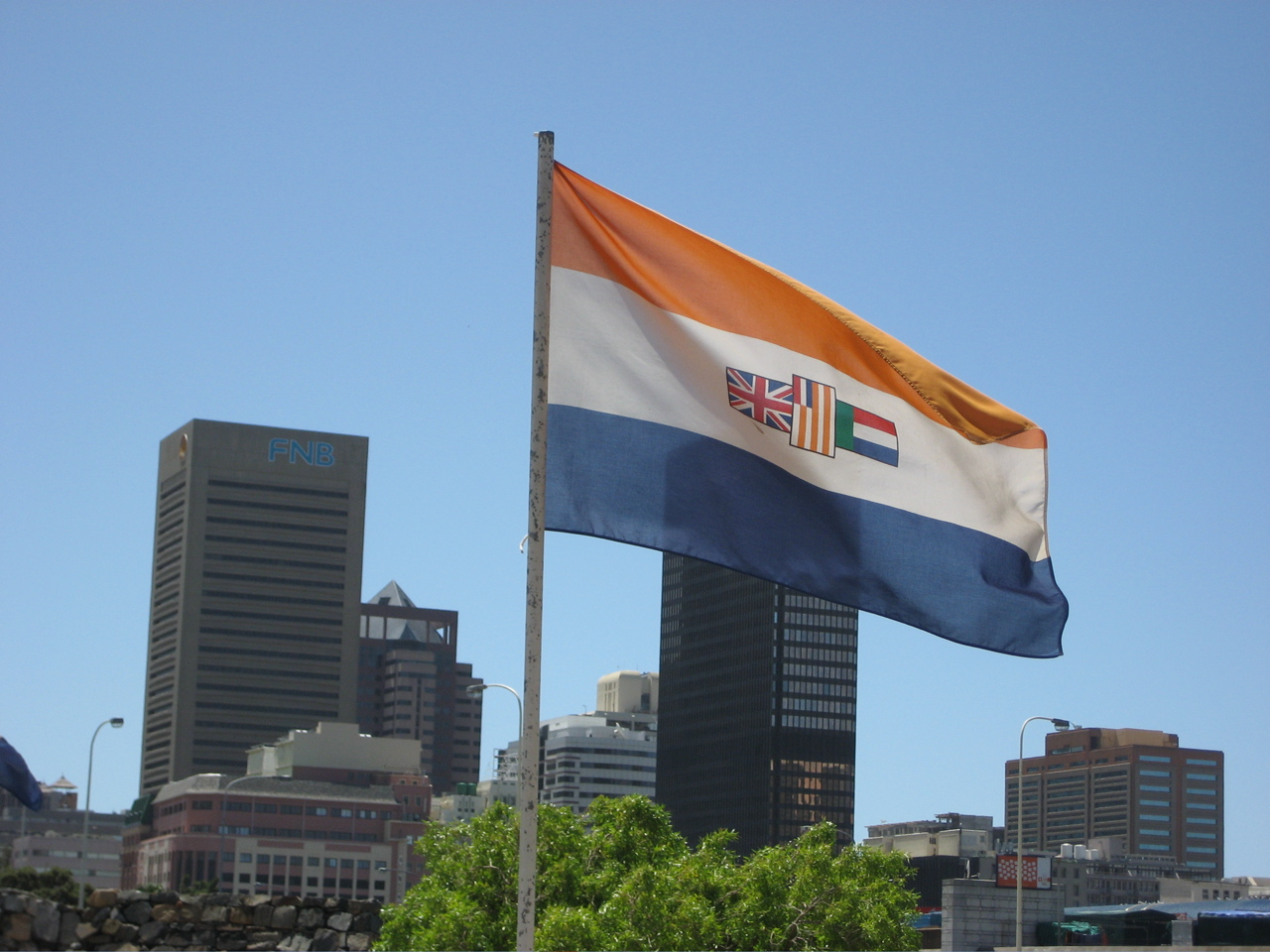
Gratuitous public display of the apartheid-era South African flag, which formerly flew from the Castle of Good Hope, has been found to constitute hate speech.

The court in South African Human Rights Commission obo South African Jewish Board of Deputies v Masuku confirmed that whether or not a statement constituted hate speech was to be determined objectively. The court, applying this test, found that a reasonable person would regard a remark referring to "Zionists who belong to the era of their Friend Hitler" as being based on Jewish identity and thus the prohibited ground of religion.

Despite the explicit mention of hate speech in the form of "words" in the Promotion of Equality and Prevention of Unfair Discrimination Act, the Supreme Court of Appeal held in Afriforum NPC v Nelson Mandela Foundation Trust that the prohibition contained in this statute is concerned with the "conveyance of ideas" or "communication of a message". As such, the gratuitous public display of the apartheid-era South African flag was found to constitute hate speech, subject to the proviso that the display of the flag for artistic, academic or journalistic purposes was not prohibited.

== Impact ==
=== Criminal law ===
The constitutionality of criminalising conduct that falls within the ambit of freedom of expression has on a number of occasions been considered by the courts. In Mamabolo, it was held that the offence of scandalising the court, which has as its aim the protection of the moral authority of the judicial process, was not unconstitutional, provided that the offence was construed narrowly to encompass only that conduct which, viewed contextually, was likely to damage the administration of justice. The constitutional validity of criminal defamation was upheld in S v Hoho, with the court finding that the relatively drastic effect of the offence was counterbalanced by its onerous burden of proof. Several divisions of the High Court have upheld convictions and sentences for the related offence of crimen injuria without the issue of freedom of expression being raised or considered by the court.

More recently, the Constitutional Court in Economic Freedom Fighters v Minister of Justice and Correctional Services ruled that a provision of the Riotous Assemblies Act criminalising the incitement of others to commit "any offence" unjustifiably limited the right to freedom of expression in so far as the provision extended beyond those offences that threaten serious harm or danger. Similarly, the court in Moyo v Minister of Police found that the Intimidation Act was unconstitutional to the extent that it criminalised expressive conduct that fell short of creating an objectively reasonable fear of imminent violent injury.

=== Defamation ===
The law of defamation has been conceived in South African legal literature as aiming to strike a balance between the right to reputation and the right to freedom of expression. This determination has been impacted in the constitutional era by the importance attached to the latter right. Similarly to the position in English law, the burden of proof rests on the defendant to establish a legitimate defence once publication of defamatory material has been proved by the plaintiff. The Constitutional Court in Khumalo v Holomisa ruled that the common-law position that the plaintiff need not prove falsehood to succeed with a claim for defamation was a reasonable and justifiable limitation on the right to freedom of expression, given the countervailing right to reputation, which is to be regarded as an incident of the broader right to dignity.

The imposition of strict liability for defamation by media defendants has, however, not survived constitutional scrutiny. The SCA in National Media Ltd v Bogoshi concluded that free speech imperatives necessitated the development of a defence of reasonable publication to excuse the publication of defamatory allegations in the press in circumstances where publication was not unreasonable given, amongst other things, the tone of the allegations and the reliability of the sources on which the allegations were based. Whilst the court's finding has been the subject of considerable academic debate, the degree of fault required to impose liability on mass media defendants following Bogoshi is generally regarded as being that of negligence.

The potential chilling effect of a claim by juristic persons, particularly trading corporations, for general damages for defamation has been recognised by the courts. The SCA in Media 24 Ltd v SA Taxi Securitisation (Pty) Ltd nonetheless held that this position did not unjustifiably limit the right to freedom of expression. The Constitutional Court subsequently found in Reddell v Mineral Sands Resources that this is subject to the qualification that such a claim is not permissible where defamatory allegations form part of "public discourse in public-interest debates", and in Mineral Sands Resources v Reddell that strategic lawsuits against public participation constitute an abuse of court process that affords a defence against a claim for defamation.

=== Obscenity ===
The majority of the Constitutional Court in Case struck down a prohibition on the "possession of indecent or obscene material" contained in the apartheid-era Indecent and Obscene Photographic Matter Act on the basis that the prohibition contravened the constitutional right to privacy. Justice Mokgoro in a minority judgment, however, reasoned that the prohibition further contravened the right to freedom of expression, which embraced the "right to receive, hold and consume expressions transmitted by others". The Court in Phillips v Director of Public Prosecutions later relied squarely on the right to freedom of expression in finding that a prohibition on nude dancing at licensed premises was unconstitutional, given its overbroad formulation that included premises such as theatres.

In Print Media South Africa v Minister of Home Affairs and Another, it was held that an administrative scheme provided for in the Films and Publications Act that required publications containing certain sexually explicit content to be submitted to the Film and Publication Board for classification before publication amounted to prior restraint, and was unconstitutional given the availability of less restrictive means to achieve the purpose of the prohibition.

=== Press freedom ===
South African law does not recognise a blanket journalistic privilege. It was, however, held in Nel v Le Roux that a witness may rely on the infringement of a constitutional right as a "just excuse" for declining to answer a question in civil or criminal proceedings. In Bosasa Operation (Pty) Ltd v Basson, the High Court dismissed an application to compel disclosure of the sources of an allegedly defamatory article on the basis of the importance of press freedom. Furthermore, the absence of adequate safeguards to maintain the confidentiality of journalists' sources was cited by the Constitutional Court as one of the respects in which the Regulation of Interception of Communications and Provision of Communication-related Information Act was unconstitutional.

The Constitutional Court has held that, as a starting point, court proceedings and records are open to the public. In Independent Newspapers (Pty) Ltd v Minister for Intelligence Services, the court, weighing the competing considerations of freedom of expression and national security, ordered the disclosure of certain portions of a court record containing classified documents on the basis that it was not in the interests of justice for those portions to be kept secret. The court has subsequently invalidated legislative provisions that prohibited the publication of the particulars of divorce actions, required absolute confidentiality in respect of asylum applications, and absolutely prohibited the disclosure of tax records regardless of public interest considerations. Each prohibition was found to be more restrictive than necessary to achieve its purpose.

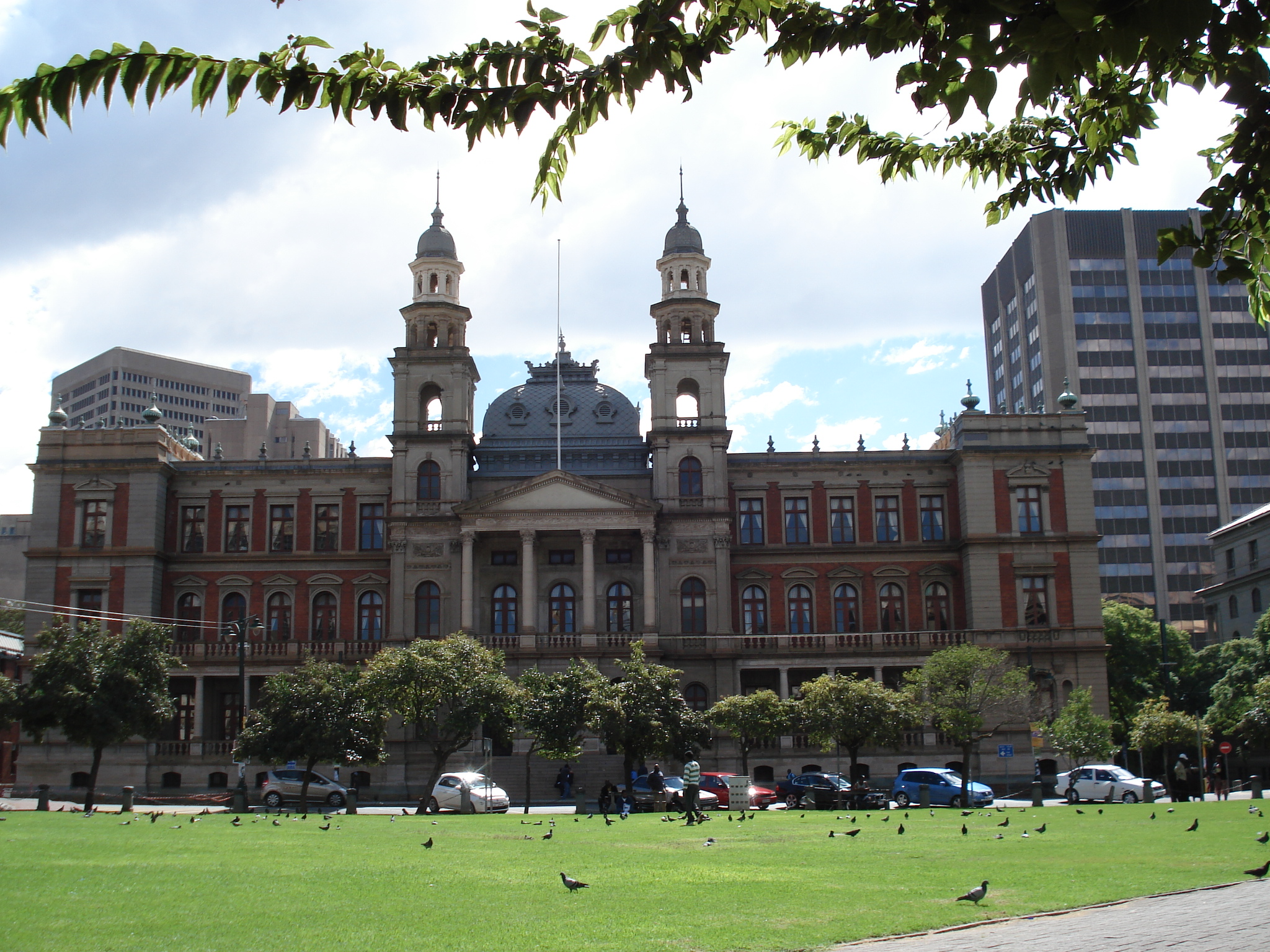
The Trial of Oscar Pistorius was broadcast live from the Palace of Justice in accordance with the ruling in Multichoice (Proprietary) Limited v National Prosecuting Authority [2014] 2 All SA 446 (GP).

The SCA in Midi Television (Pty) Ltd t/a e-TV v Director of Public Prosecutions (Western Cape) held that the exercise of a court's discretion in favour of restricting publication would only be in the interests of justice where "the prejudice that the publication might cause to the administration of justice is demonstrable and substantial and there is a real risk that the prejudice will occur if publication takes place". This finding has been interpreted as support for a presumption against the constitutionality of prior restraints and interdicts against defamatory publications, and is regarded as an attenuation of the sub judice rule. In accordance with the principle of open justice, the courts have, to varying degrees, permitted the broadcasting of proceedings involving matters of public interest, including the proceedings of the Commission of Enquiry into Cricket Match-Fixing and Related Matters, the questioning of Mark Thatcher in relation to his involvement in the 2004 Equatorial Guinea coup attempt, and the criminal trials of Oscar Pistorius and Henri van Breda.

The right to publish has occasionally come into conflict with the countervailing right to privacy. The High Court in MEC for Health, Mpumalanga v M-Net & Another refused to interdict a Carte Blanche broadcast concerning alleged malpractice in a public hospital despite the infringement of the privacy of hospital staff. Similarly, an application for an order preventing further commentary on the hospital records of former Minister of Health Manto Tshabalala-Msimang was dismissed on the basis of her status as a public figure. The courts have, however, held that the public interest defence carries less weight if the content sought to be published is of an intimate nature.

=== Trademark law ===
The decision of the Constitutional Court in Laugh It Off Promotions v South African Breweries has been recognised as a leading judgment on the relationship between trademark law and freedom of expression in English-speaking jurisdictions. The majority held that a provision of the Trade Marks Act that sought to prevent the dilution of well-known trademarks had to be interpreted in the manner most compatible with freedom of expression. The parodying of the trademark of Carling Black Label beer on T-shirts sold for profit was found not to have resulted in a substantial likelihood of economic or trade harm to the trademark owner, and thus did not amount to trademark infringement. Whether the unauthorised use of a trademark amounts to protected expression was held to be central to this determination.

Commentators have suggested that generous interpretation of the existing defences to a claim of copyright infringement would ordinarily be sufficient to give due regard to free speech considerations. The courts have further remarked that public interest, and the related freedom, duty and responsibility of the media, could in certain circumstances outweigh considerations regarding copyright.

=== Commercial speech ===
The SCA in British American Tobacco South Africa (Pty) Ltd v Minister of Health recognised that commercial speech constitutes protected expression. Whilst cautioning against "artificially created divisions between the value of different forms of speech", the courts have concluded that limitations on commercial speech are more readily justifiable than limitations on other forms of expression.

In City of Cape Town v Ad Outpost (Pty) Ltd, a by-law imposing an absolute prohibition on billboard advertising by a third party on another's premises was struck down on the basis that less restrictive means were available to achieve the purpose of the by-law. Contrastingly, a requirement of prior consent for the erection of billboards visible from a street or public place has been held to advance the legitimate, substantial and pressing purpose of promoting traffic safety and urban aesthetics. Public policy considerations featured prominently as part of the SCA's rationale for concluding in British American Tobacco that a blanket ban on the advertising and promotion of tobacco products was reasonable and justifiable. The ban imposed by the Tobacco Products Control Act was found to be "the only way to address" the negative public health effects of smoking, particularly in light of South Africa's obligations under the WHO Framework Convention on Tobacco Control.
