= Promotion of Access to Information Amendment Act, 2019 =

South African freedom of information law

Promotion of Access to Information Amendment Act 31 of 2019

Parliament of South Africa
- Long title: To provide for, and regulate, public and private funding of political parties, independent candidates and independent representatives, in particular; the establishment and management of Funds to fund represented political parties and independent representatives sufficiently; to prohibit certain donations made directly to political parties, independent candidates and independent representatives; to regulate disclosure of donations accepted; to determine the duties of political parties, independent candidates and independent representatives in respect of funding; to provide for powers and duties of the Commission; to provide for administrative fines; to create offences and penalties; to repeal the Public Funding of Represented Political Parties Act, 1997, to provide for transitional matters; and to provide for related matters.
- Assented to: 21 January 2019
- Commenced: 1 April 2021

Amends
- Public Funding of Represented Political Parties Act, 1997; Promotion of Access to Information Act, 2000

Amended by
- Electoral Matters Amendment Act, 2024
- Status: In force (amended)

The Promotion of Access to Information Amendment Act 31 of 2019 is an Act of the Parliament of South Africa.

== Background ==
The Public Funding of Represented Political Parties Act 103 of 1997 provided for public funding of political parties in amounts relative to their size in Parliament. The Promotion of Access to Information Act 2 of 2000 (PAIA) provided for access to information from a variety of governmental and non-governmental bodies. However, PAIA did not cover political parties.

In My Vote Counts v Speaker of the National Assembly the South African Constitutional Court ruled that the PAIA was constitutionally invalid to the extent that it failed to provide for the "recordal, preservation and reasonable disclosure" of information on the private funding of political parties and independent candidates and mandated Parliament to amend the law within 18 months.
