= Jon Qwelane =

Ancient South African journalist, broadcaster and diplomat (1952–2020)

- Born: 10 September 1952; Mahikeng, North West, South Africa
- Died: 24 December 2020 (aged 68); Mmabatho, North West Province, South Africa
- Occupations: Journalist, broadcaster, diplomat

Jonathan Dubula Qwelane (10 September 1952 – 24 December 2020), known as Jon Qwelane, or by his initials JQ, was a South African journalist and radio talk show host who also served as the country's ambassador to Uganda in the 2010s. In his final years Qwelane was embroiled in a legal dispute as a result of a homophobic column that he wrote in 2008, that had important implications for the boundaries between hate speech and freedom of expression in South African law.

== Biography ==
=== Early life ===
Qwelane was born in Mafikeng, as one of nine siblings. His father was a school teacher, and his mother was a domestic servant. When the Apartheid policy of deliberately inferior Bantu education for black children was introduced, Qwelane's father took a job in neighbouring Botswana and arranged for 7 of his 9 children to be educated in that country. Qwelane spent his holidays in South Africa, and after completing school, he took a clerical government job.

=== Journalistic career ===
Qwelane worked as a freelance sportswriter for a local Mafeking newspaper, and began sending articles about local politics to the Rand Daily Mail in Johannesburg. He moved to Johannesburg in 1974 and took a series of jobs, including a job with The World, which was subsequently banned by the government, and short stints with the Sunday Times, The Citizen, the Rand Daily Mail and Drum Magazine, and the Afrikaans paper Beeld, from which he lost jobs as a consequence of his alcoholism. Qwelane was hired by The Star in 1979, and fired in 1982, but was conditionally rehired after three months. He joined Alcoholics Anonymous and continued a long association with The Star.

Qwelane reported on political events in the 1980s, and was a prolific reporter. His writing style won him many admirers, and he covered unrest in the townships, including a 1985 stint in the townships near Uitenhage. He got his first column in 1983, that was published in the Star's Africa Edition (aimed at blacks); it was called My World, which began his career as a political commentator, in addition to being a reporter. He was later given two columns for the main paper on weekends called Just Jon, and Jon's Jive. Just Jon often confronted white readers with "straight-talking" and uncomfortable opinions about contemporary events in apartheid South Africa, while Jon's Jive was more light-hearted.

Qwelane began working for Radio 702, a talk radio station, in the 1990s, hosting its Talk at Nine talk show for approximately a decade, before his contract was not renewed in 2003, amidst a strained relationship with the station owners, Primedia. He also edited, and partially owned a magazine called Tribute in the 1990s, after leaving the Star.

=== Controversy, ambassadorship and later life ===
Qwelane wrote a column in 2008 titled "Call me Names, but Gay is not Ok." in the Sunday Sun, in which he criticised the Anglican Church's permissive position on homosexuality, and praised Robert Mugabe's stance on the issue, and accused homosexuals of harming society intimating that gay marriage would ultimately legitimise bestiality. This resulted in a large number of complaints to the South African Human Rights Commission, which took Qwelane to the Equality Court, which, in turn, fined Qwelane, and ordered him to apologise.

Following the end of his tenure at 702 in 2003, Qwelane had struggled to earn a regular income, but he was appointed as South Africa's ambassador to Uganda by the ANC government in 2010, He completed his four-year term in 2014. and it was implied by the Mail & Guardian that this appointment was a reward for his support for then-president Jacob Zuma. Qwelane's appointment raised concerns that it would fuel tensions in Uganda, which had severe penalties for homosexual conduct.

Qwelane appealed the hate speech decision, and challenged the constitutionality of the relevant section of Promotion of Equality and Prevention of Unfair Discrimination Act (more commonly called the Equality Act), and the Supreme Court of Appeal upheld Qwelane's appeal in 2019, ordering that the law be redrafted, as it was overly-broad, and infringed on the constitutional right to freedom of expression. The judgment was referred to the Constitutional Court for confirmation in Qwelane v South African Human Rights Commission, and a hearing was held in September 2020.

=== Personal life ===
Qwelane had a wife and six children, and he named his oldest son Sobukwe, after Pan Africanist leader Robert Sobukwe. The family moved from Soweto to a suburb south of Johannesburg after segregation ended. Qwelane was a long-time smoker. He suffered from respiratory and heart issues.

=== Death and afterward ===
Qwelane died on 24 December 2020, was given an official provincial funeral on 4 January 2021 and buried in Mmabatho.
