= Jarrard =

Jarrard is a surname. Notable people with the surname include:

- John Jarrard (1953–2001), American country songwriter
- Levi D. Jarrard (1824–1886), American businessman and politician
- Ted Jarrard (1922–2010), Australian rules footballer

== See also ==
- Jarrar (disambiguation)
