= Laugh It Off Promotions v South African Breweries =

South African legal case

- Court: Constitutional Court of South Africa
- Full case name: Laugh It Off Promotions CC v South African Breweries International (Finance) BV trading as Sabmark International and Another
- Decided: 27 May 2005
- Docket nos.: CCT 42/04
- Citations: [2005] ZACC 7; 2006 (1) SA 144 (CC); 2005 (8) BCLR 743 (CC)

Case history
- Appealed from: Supreme Court of Appeal – Laugh It Off Promotions v South African Breweries International [2004] ZASCA 76; High Court of South Africa, Cape Provincial Division – South African Breweries International v Laugh It Off Promotions [2003] ZAWCHC 100

Court membership
- Judges sitting: Langa DCJ, Madala J, Mokgoro J, Moseneke J, Ngcobo J, O’Regan J, Sachs J, Skweyiya J, van der Westhuizen J and Yacoob J

Case opinions
- Decision by: Moseneke J (unanimous)
- Concurrence: Sachs J

Laugh It Off Promotions CC v South African Breweries International (Finance) BV t/a Sabmark International and Another is a landmark decision of the Constitutional Court of South Africa on the intersection between freedom of expression and trademark law. The case concerned the proper interpretation of anti-trademark dilution provisions of the Trade Marks Act 194 of 1993 in the context of the sale of T-shirts parodying established commercial brands. The court's unanimous judgment, delivered on 27 May 2005, was written by Justice Dikgang Moseneke.

== Background and prior action ==
The appellant was Laugh It Off Promotions, a close corporation founded by Justin Nurse. Both as a form of culture jamming and for profit, Laugh It Off produced and sold T-shirts that parodied well-known trademarks. By late 2001, its range of products included a T-shirt which bore a print markedly similar to the famous Carling Black Label trademark, except that the words "Black Label" were replaced with "Black Labour" and the words "Carling Beer" with "White Guilt"; likewise, the slogan "America's lusty lively beer" was replaced by "Africa's lusty lively exploitation since 1652", and "Enjoyed by men around the world" was replaced by "No regard given worldwide". Aggrieved, SABMiller, which owned the Carling Black Label trademarks (and authorised South African Breweries to use them in South Africa), sued Laugh It Off in the High Court of South Africa.

SAB contended that Laugh It Off's use of its registered trademarks constituted trademark dilution in terms of section 34(1)(c) of the Trade Marks Act 194 of 1993. That section provided in part that trademark rights were infringed by:

the unauthorized use in the course of trade in relation to any goods or services of a mark which is identical or similar to a trade mark registered, if such trade mark is well known in the Republic and the use of the said mark would be likely to take unfair advantage of, or be detrimental to, the distinctive character or the repute of the registered trade mark, notwithstanding the absence of confusion or deception...

SAB sought an interdict against Laugh It Off on this basis. In response, Laugh It Off contended, first, that it had not infringed the statutory provision, insofar as it had not been established that its use of the Black Label imagery would be detrimental to the brand's reputation. Second, it contended that, in any case, it was exercising its freedom of expression, as entrenched in section 16(1) of the Constitution of South Africa. However, on 16 April 2003, Judge Roger Cleaver of the Cape High Court ruled in SAB's favour and granted the interdict. Moreover, Cleaver found that the racial overtones of the T-shirt design "border[ed] on hate speech", and section 16(2)(c) of the Constitution explicitly excluded hate speech from the protection of freedom of expression.

Laugh It Off appealed the High Court's decision in the Supreme Court of Appeal. On 16 August 2004, in a unanimous judgment written by Judge of Appeal Louis Harms, the Supreme Court dismissed the appeal but amended the restraint ordered by the High Court, which it said was unduly broad. Thereafter Laugh It Off lodged a final appeal in the Constitutional Court of South Africa, which heard argument on 8 March 2005. The non-profit Freedom of Expression Institute, which had been admitted as amicus curiae in the Supreme Court, was again admitted as amicus and made submissions in support of Laugh It Off's application.

== Judgments ==
=== Main judgment ===
On 27 May 2005, the Constitutional Court ruled unanimously in Laugh It Off's favour, upholding the appeal and overturning the orders of both lower courts. Justice Dikgang Moseneke, writing the main judgment, held that there was no infringement under section 34 of the Trade Marks Act. This finding turned on his interpretation of the relevant provision, which was based on the court's responsibility to seek:

a construction of section 34(1)(c) most compatible with the right to free expression. The anti-dilution provision must bear a meaning which is the least destructive of other entrenched rights and in this case free expression rights. The reach of the statutory prohibition must be curtailed to the least intrusive means necessary to achieve the purpose of the section. Courts must be astute not to convert the anti-dilution safeguard of renowned trade marks usually controlled by powerful financial interests into a monopoly adverse to other claims of expressive conduct of at least equal cogency and worth in our broader society.

The majority found that, thus interpreted, section 34 of the Trade Marks Act must be read to require that a finding of trademark infringement depends on the trademark-owner demonstrating "a likelihood of substantial economic detriment". Unlike the lower courts, the Constitutional Court did not believe that SAB had demonstrated sufficiently substantial detriment; indeed, the facts did not support its contention that it was likely to incur substantial commercial harm.

=== Sachs's judgment ===
Justice Albie Sachs, who concurred in Moseneke's judgment, also filed a separate opinion on the role of parody and humour in sustaining constitutional democracy. His opinion began with the often-quoted rhetorical question:

Does the law have a sense of humour? This question is raised whenever the irresistible force of free expression, in the form of parody, meets the immovable object of property rights, in the form of trademark protection.

Sachs went on to explain that, though he agreed with Moseneke's argument, he also believed that Laugh It Off's appeal could be upheld "on more substantial grounds": that is, that SAB's case had not "failed simply because they did not back it up with clip-board evidence to prove a measure of detriment". For Sachs, the "uniquely expressive weight of the parodic form used" was such that the expression should be valued far more highly than SAB's "tenuous property interests".

== Significance ==
Laugh It Off was the first case before the Constitutional Court to require the application of the Bill of Rights to South African trademark law.
