= Hanan Jarrar =

Palestinian diplomat

Hanan Jarrar حنان جرار
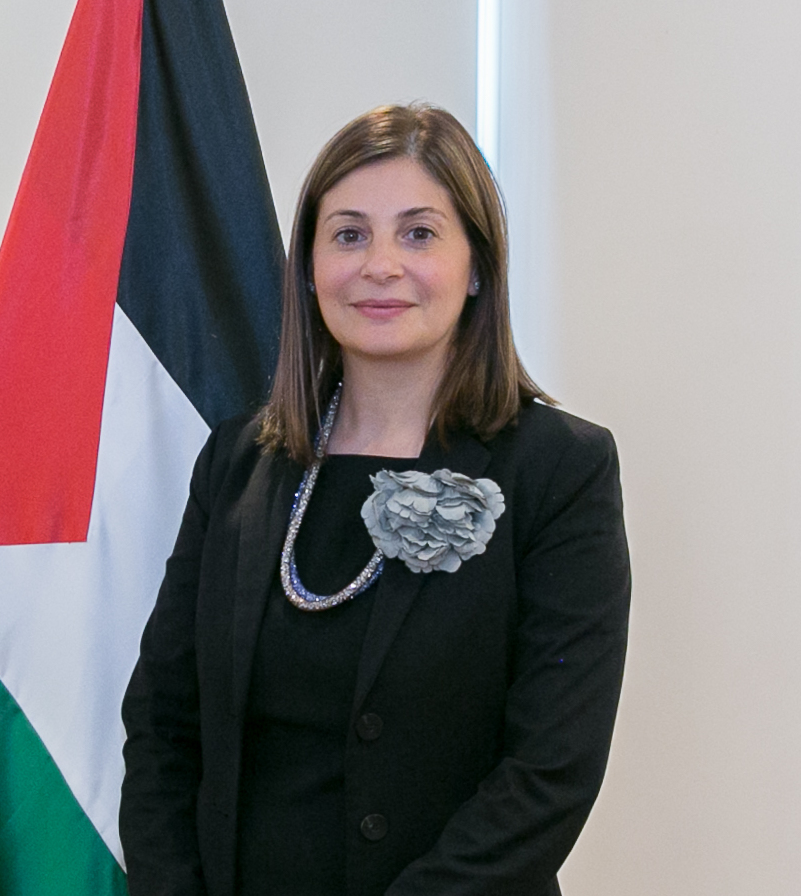

Palestinian Ambassador to South Africa
- Incumbent
- Assumed office 28 January 2020

Palestinian Ambassador to Namibia
- Incumbent
- Assumed office 29 November 2020

Personal details
- Born: Hanan Na'eem Ameen Jarrar; 1975 (age 50–51) Jenin, State of Palestine

Hanan Na'eem Ameen Jarrar, (Arabic: حنان نعيم أمين جرار; Born on 14 February 1975 in Jenin) is a Palestinian politician and diplomat serving as Palestinian Ambassador to South Africa and non-resident Ambassador of the State of Palestine to Namibia, Malawi and Lesotho. On 28 December 2019, she was appointed as Ambassador to South Africa by Palestinian President Mahmoud Abbas. On 28 January 2020, she presented her credentials to the President of South Africa, Cyril Ramaphosa.

== See also ==
- Palestine–South Africa relations
