= List of judgments of the Constitutional Court of South Africa delivered in 2003 =

The table below lists the judgments of the Constitutional Court of South Africa delivered in 2003.

The members of the court at the start of 2003 were Chief Justice Arthur Chaskalson, Deputy Chief Justice Pius Langa, and judges Lourens Ackermann, Richard Goldstone, Tholie Madala, Yvonne Mokgoro, Dikgang Moseneke, Sandile Ngcobo, Kate O'Regan, Albie Sachs and Zak Yacoob. Justice Goldstone retired in November and Justice Ackermann retired at the end of the year.

Citation	Case name	Heard	Decided	Majority author
[2003] ZACC 1	Phillips and Another v Director of Public Prosecutions (Witwatersrand Local Division) and Others	29 August 2002	11 March 2003	Yacoob
[2003] ZACC 2	Satchwell v President of the Republic of South Africa and Another	11 March 2003	17 March 2003	O'Regan
[2003] ZACC 3	J and Another v Director General, Department of Home Affairs and Others	27 February 2003	28 March 2003	Goldstone
[2003] ZACC 4	National Director of Public Prosecutions v Mohamed NO and Others	25 February 2003	3 April 2003	Ackermann
[2003] ZACC 5	Swartbooi and Others v Brink and Another (No 1)	12 November 2002	3 April 2003	Yacoob
[2003] ZACC 25	Swartbooi and Others v Brink and Another (No 2)	26 February 2003	3 April 2003	Yacoob
[2003] ZACC 6	Wallach v High Court of South Africa (Witwatersrand Local Division) and Others		4 April 2003	The Court
[2003] ZACC 7	Xinwa and Others v Volkswagen of South Africa (Pty) Ltd		4 April 2003	The Court
[2003] ZACC 8	Ingledew v Financial Services Board	18 February 2003	13 May 2003	Ngcobo
[2003] ZACC 9	S v Shongwe		30 May 2003	The Court
[2003] ZACC 10	Minister of Home Affairs v Eisenberg & Associates	20 May 2003	27 June 2003	Chaskalson
[2003] ZACC 11	Fourie and Another v Minister of Home Affairs and Another		31 July 2003	Moseneke
[2003] ZACC 12	Thebus and Another v S	20 February 2003	28 August 2003	Moseneke
[2003] ZACC 13	Ex Parte Omar		11 September 2003	The Court
[2003] ZACC 15	Head of Department, Department of Education, Limpopo Province v Settlers Agricultural High School and Others		2 October 2003	The Court
[2003] ZACC 16	Phenithi v Minister of Education and Others		6 October 2003	The Court
[2003] ZACC 17	Gcali v MEC for Housing and Local Government, Eastern Cape and Others		6 October 2003	The Court
[2003] ZACC 18	Alexkor Ltd and Another v Richtersveld Community and Others	4–5 September 2003	14 October 2003	The Court
[2003] ZACC 19	De Reuck v Director of Public Prosecutions (Witwatersrand Local Division) and Others	14 May 2003	15 October 2003	Langa
[2003] ZACC 14	Western Cape Workers Association v Halgang Properties CC		14 November 2003	The Court
[2003] ZACC 20	Wallach v Registrar of Deeds (Pretoria) and Others; Wallach v Spilg and Others		14 November 2003	The Court
[2003] ZACC 21	S v Van der Westhuizen		24 November 2003	The Court
[2003] ZACC 22	S v Mercer		24 November 2003	The Court
[2003] ZACC 23	Municipality of Plettenberg Bay v Van Dyk & Co Inc		24 November 2003	The Court
[2003] ZACC 24	Shaik v Minister of Justice and Constitutional Development and Others	11 November 2003	2 December 2003	Ackermann
