= Abdel Hafiz Nofal =

Palestinian politician

- عبد الحفيظ نوفل
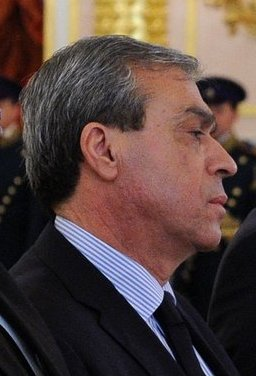
- Ambassador Nofal in 2015

Palestinian Ambassador to the Russian Federation
- Incumbent
- Assumed office August 2015
- President: Mahmoud Abbas

Palestinian Ambassador to South Africa, Namibia, and Lesotho
- Incumbent
- Assumed office 2012

Assistant Minister of the Ministry of National Economy

Deputy Minister of the Ministry of National Economy
- Incumbent
- Assumed office 2008

Personal details
- Education: University of Kyiv
- Occupation: Politician, Diplomat

Abdel Hafiz Nofal (Arabic: عبد الحفيظ نوفل; born July 17, 1951) is a Palestinian politician and the (Extraordinary and Plenipotentiary) Ambassador of the State of Palestine to the Russian Federation. He formerly served as the ambassador of the State of Palestine to South Africa, Namibia, and Lesotho. He also held economic ministerial positions within the public sector, overseeing commerce, industry, and labor.

== Early life ==
Nofal was raised by a merchant family on the outskirts of Ramallah, about 30 minutes to the north of Jerusalem. He received a Bachelor of Arts (B.A.) and then a master's degree (M.A.) in International Relations while on scholarship from the University of Kyiv.

== Career ==
=== Economic ===
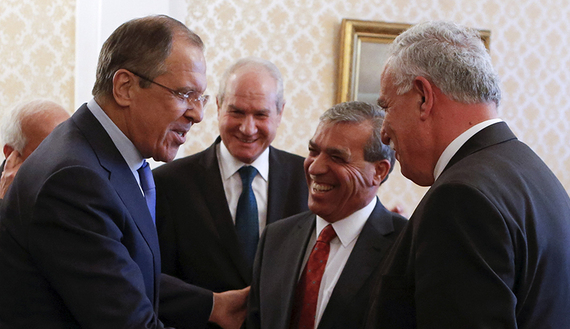
Palestinian Foreign Minister Riyad al-Maliki (R) and Nofal (M) meet Russian Foreign Minister Lavrov (L)

Nofal oversaw the PLO’s economic activities in the content of Africa between 1981 and 1986, while chairing the Samed Foundation. He then served as its Director of the Department of International Relations until 1994. After signing the Oslo Accords, the PLO transitioned from diasporas to the Palestinian Territories, and Nofal served as the Assistant Minister of the Ministry of National Economy until 2008, when he became the Deputy Minister of the same ministry.

=== Political ===
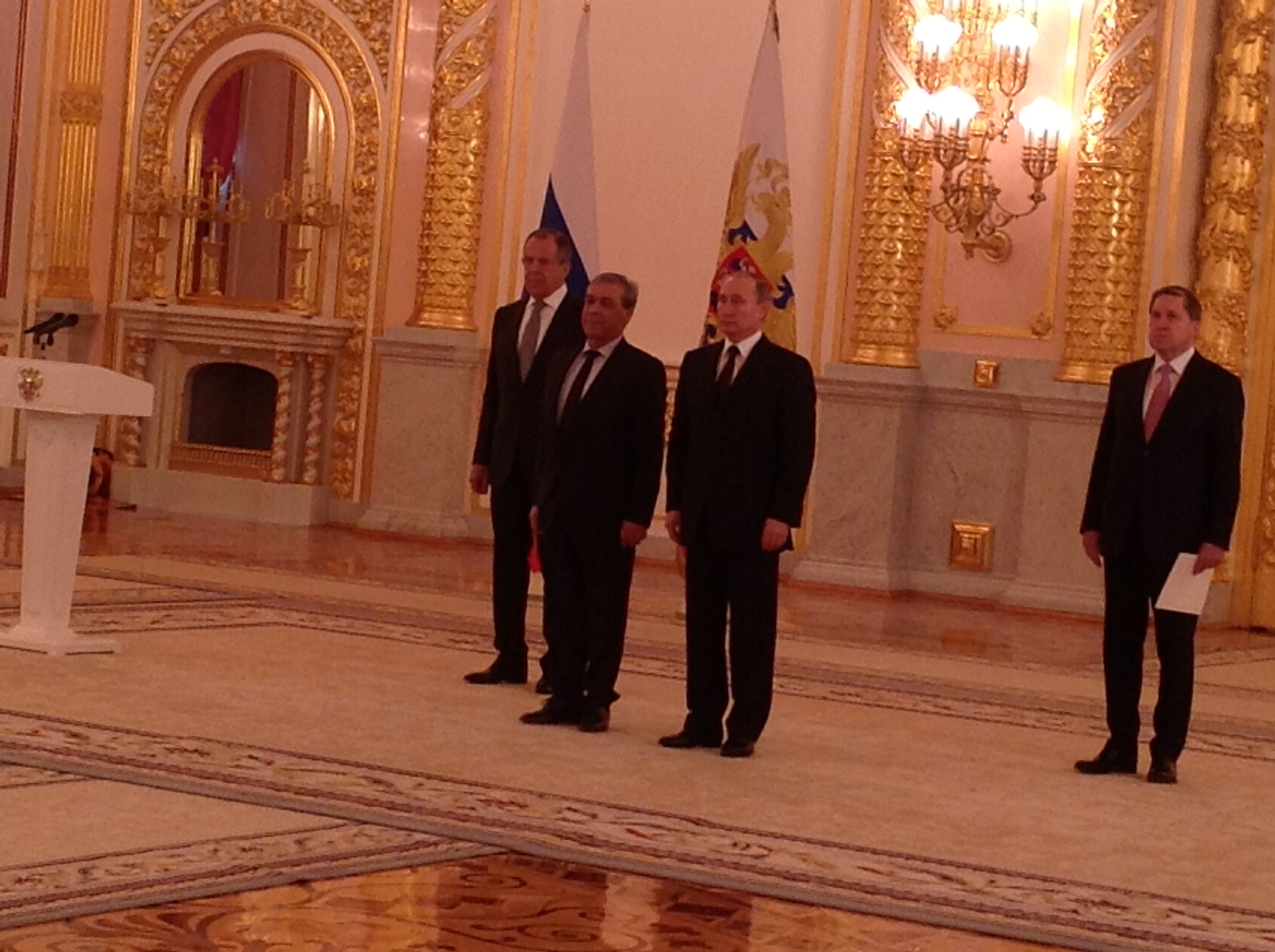
Nofal and Vladimir Putin, with Foreign Minister Sergey Lavrov in the background, at The Kremlin.

In 2012, Nofal transitioned to a political role and became the Ambassador of The State of Palestine to South Africa. Nofal then was nominated and appointed by Palestinian President Mahmoud Abbas to become the Palestinian Ambassador to the Russian Federation in early 2015.

== Board and Other Memberships ==
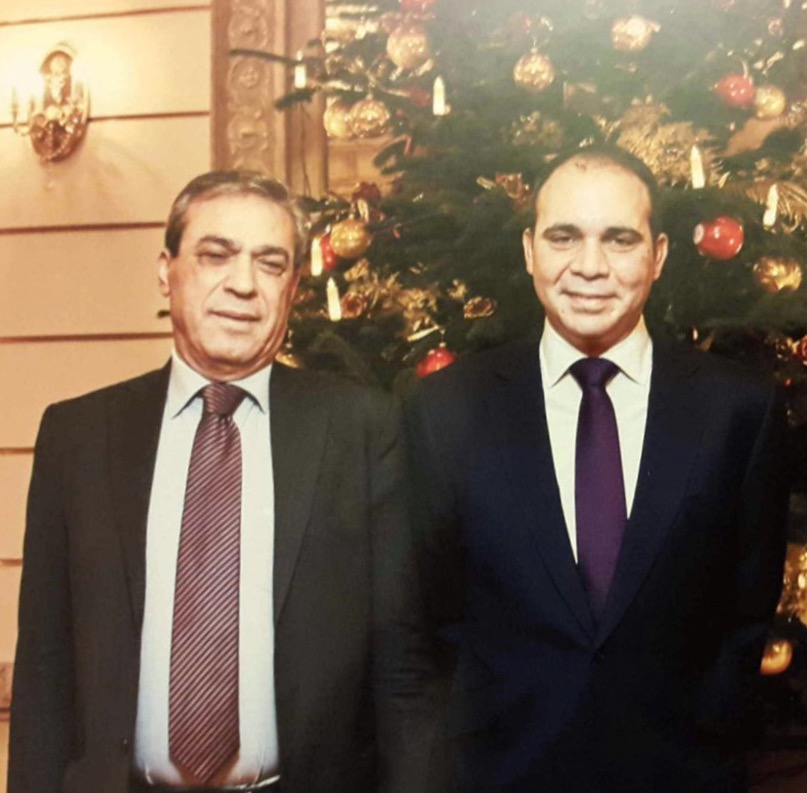
Nofal and Prince Ali bin Hussein of Jordan

Nofal is a Member of the Palestinian-Israeli Joint Economic Committee, Vice President of the Palestinian Administration of Capital Markets, Member of the Board of the Palestinian Investment Support Agency, Member of the Board of National Committee for Combating Money Laundering, Director of the Palestinian Standards Institute, President of Special Technical Oversight Group coordinating Palestine's membership in the World Trade Organization (WTO), and President of the Palestinian Public-Private Partnership Committee

== Personal life ==
Nofal enjoys spending time with his family and hiking. He has been married for 30 years and resides with his wife in Moscow City.

== See also ==
- List of ambassadors of the State of Palestine to South Africa
