= Phillips v Director of Public Prosecutions =

South African legal case

- Court: Constitutional Court of South Africa
- Full case name: Andrew Lionel Phillips and Another v Director of Public Prosecutions, Witwatersrand Local Division and Others
- Decided: 11 March 2003
- Docket nos.: CCT 20/02
- Citations: [2003] ZACC 1; 2003 (3) SA 345; 2003 (4) BCLR 357

Case history
- Prior actions: High Court of South Africa, Witwatersrand Local Division – Phillips and Another v Director of Public Prosecutions and Others 2002 (5) SA 556 (W)

Court membership
- Judges sitting: Chaskalson CJ, Langa DCJ, Goldstone, Kriegler, Madala, Mokgoro, Ngcobo, O'Regan, Sachs J and Yacoob JJ

Case opinions
- Section 160(d) of the Liquor Act, 1989 violates the right to freedom of expression and is unconstitutional. (9:1.)
- Decision by: Yacoob J (Chaskalson, Langa, Goldstone, Kriegler, Mokgoro, Ngcobo, O'Regan and Sachs concurring)
- Concurrence: Ngcobo J
- Concurrence: Sachs J
- Dissent: Madala J

Phillips and Another v Director of Public Prosecutions, Witwatersrand Local Division and Others is a 2003 decision of the Constitutional Court of South Africa on the right to freedom of expression. The case concerned a statutory prohibition against obscene or nude performances, such as striptease, on premises where liquor was sold. In Justice Albie Sachs's summation, the question was "whether it is constitutionally permissible to prohibit the combination of tipples and nipples".

Finding that this prohibition was unconstitutional, the court struck down section 160(d) of the Liquor Act, 1989. Justice Zak Yacoob wrote for the court's majority and Justice Tholie Madala wrote the lone dissent.

== Background ==
Andrew Phillips was the sole shareholder in Viva Afrika Investments, a close corporation which held a liquor license for the sale and consumption of liquor on various premises in the Midrand. He was best known as the owner of the Ranch, a club in Sandton which came under intense scrutiny by the Scorpions in 2000; as part of this investigation, Phillips was charged with several offences, including violating the terms of his liquor license for allowing striptease dancing on the premises. Section 160(d) of the Liquor Act, 1989 made it a criminal offence for holders of on-consumption licenses to allow:

any person– to perform an offensive, indecent or obscene act; or who is not clothed or not properly clothed, to perform or to appear, on a part of the licensed premises where entertainment of any nature is presented or to which the public has access.

Ahead of prosecution on this charge, Phillips and Viva Afrika approached the High Court of South Africa to challenge the constitutionality of section 160(d). Several state respondents were joined in the proceedings, but none appeared in the High Court. Thus on 14 June 2002, the Witwatersrand Local Division delivered judgment in favour of Phillips, finding that section 160(d) imposed an unjustifiable limitation on the right to freedom of expression. This declaration of constitutional invalidity was referred to the Constitutional Court of South Africa, which heard argument on 29 August 2002. Phillips was represented by David Unterhalter and the state again failed to appear in court.

== Majority judgment ==
On 11 March 2003, Justice Zak Yacoob delivered judgment on behalf of a nine-member majority of the Constitutional Court. His judgment was joined by Chief Justice Arthur Chaskalson, Deputy Chief Justice Pius Langa, and Justices Richard Goldstone, Johann Kriegler, Yvonne Mokgoro, Sandile Ngcobo, Kate O'Regan, and Albie Sachs. The majority confirmed the High Court's order, declaring section 160(d) of the Liquor Act to be unconstitutional and invalid.

Like the High Court, the majority decided the matter with reference to section 16(1) of the Constitution, which guaranteed the right to freedom of expression. Yacoob found it was self-evident that this right was limited by section 160(d) of the Liquor Act, insofar as it had the effect of restricting the performance of various kinds of entertainment covered by the provision's broad scope. He also found that this limitation was not justifiable under section 36 of the Constitution. Given that the act's overarching purpose was to regulate liquor consumption, the purpose of the impugned provision was likely to control the conduct of patrons of licensed premises and therefore to minimise the possible harm incurred by liquor consumption in a public place. However, the restrictions effectuated by the provision were unjustifiably broad. It was particularly concerning that the provision applied to theatres which held liquor licenses, because the central business of theatres was to realise artistic freedom. Yet "the provision controls the kind of entertainment that may be provided at licensed theatres instead of controlling behaviour or conduct at these establishments".

== Concurring judgments ==
Justices Ngcobo and Sachs, both of whom concurred in the majority judgment, also wrote separately to raise certain qualifications. Ngcobo had "grave doubts whether there is any connection between the striptease dancing involved in this case and the constitutional right to freedom of expression"; it was not clear that striptease was an exercise of artistic freedom, and, even if it was, that consideration might be outweighed by the important governmental purpose of minimising the harm from public liquor consumption. Per Ngcobo:

In my view there may have been no constitutional difficulty with the subsection if it had not included theatres within its reach. In that event, if freedom of expression had been limited at all, it would probably have been limited to a very small extent. All that may have been prohibited then is sexually explicit conduct – a prohibition regarded by a reasonable person inspired by constitutional values as being unacceptable.

However, Ngcobo concluded that it was not necessary to reach a firm conclusion on these issues, because the impugned provision applied in theatres, and the limitation on freedom of expression could not be justified in that context.

On the other hand, in contrast to Ngcobo, Sachs sought to reverse the majority's emphasis on artistic freedom, arguing instead that the central issue was, "to what extent and in what way may the state dictate dress and undress in off-the-street places to which the public has access?". This question applied equally to "potentially coarser entertainment" as to "the high art of theatre and cabaret". Sachs agreed with Yacoob that the current case could be decided by a "cautious approach", but he nonetheless sought to point out that further "perplexities" remained to be resolved in future cases.

== Dissenting judgment ==
Justice Tholie Madala, who wrote the court's sole dissent, would have reversed the High Court's order, finding instead that section 160(d) was consistent with the Constitution. In virtue of Madala's dissent, Phillips became one of only two Constitutional Court judgments that were not unanimous during the 2003 term, the other being S v Thebus.

Unlike the majority, Madala held that the impugned provision was sufficiently narrowly tailored to avoid trenching unjustifiably on freedom of expression. Per Madala:

The combination of alcohol, intoxicated men and provocative nude dancing is potentially disastrous. From the face of the impugned section, it is obvious that the state is attempting to regulate and control the adversity that results from the convergence of these three elements. It is not an unduly onerous limitation for the government to require liquor license owners to refrain from selling alcohol on the days where there will be a performance with people "not clothed or not properly clothed"... There is no less restrictive means of preventing the potentially disastrous consequences that arise from the combination of drunkenness and nudity in public places. In all the circumstances the limitation is reasonable and justifiable.

Because Madala would have dismissed the constitutional challenge based on freedom of expression, he also considered two other arguments advanced by Phillips, which the majority had not determined. These were the argument that section 160(d) infringed the rule of law because it was vague, and the argument that section 160(d) infringed the constitutional right to freedom of the person by depriving people of freedom without just cause. Madala dismissed both of these further arguments as unpersuasive.
