= Institute for Democracy in South Africa v African National Congress =

South African legal case

Institute for Democracy in South Africa v African National Congress is an important case in South African administrative and constitutional law, concerning the right of access to information. The applicants sought access to the donation records of certain political parties, but the latter were judged to be private bodies in relation to those records. Section 8(1) of the Promotion of Access to Information Act (PAIA) recognises that a body may be "public" or "private" for the purposes of the Act depending on whether the record in question "relates to the exercise of a power or the performance of a function as a public body or as a private body."

== See also ==
- South African administrative law
- Access to information in South African law
