= List of ambassadors of Palestine to South Africa =

Ambassador

Coordinates: 39.937704°N 116.460642°E

Ambassador of Palestine to South Africa
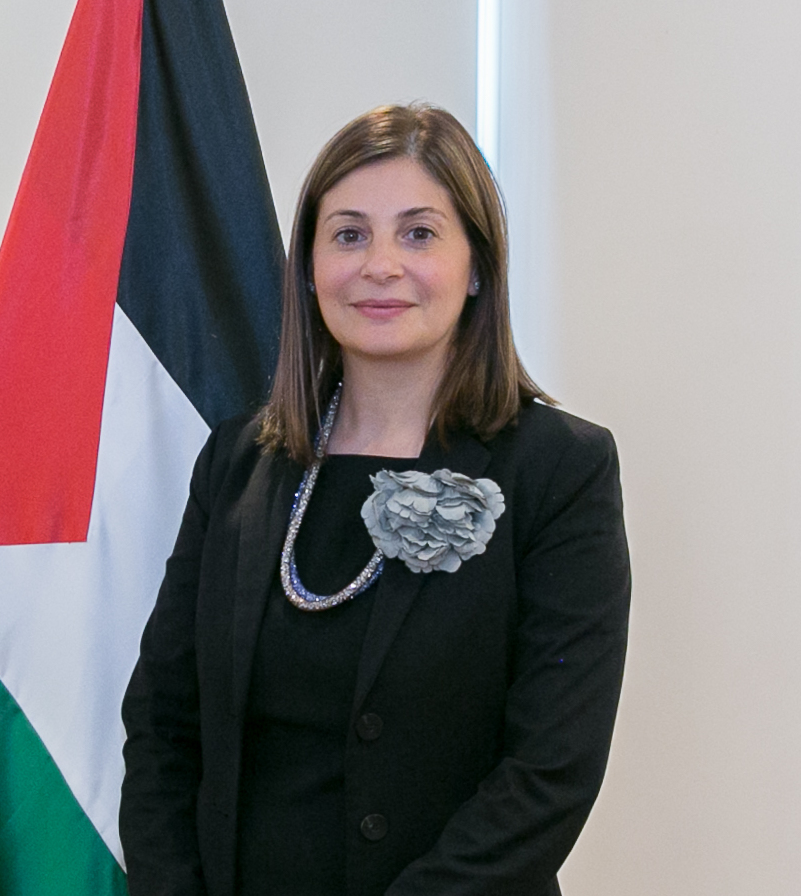
- Incumbent; Hanan Jarrar since January 28, 2020
- Inaugural holder: Salman El-Herfi
- Formation: 1995

The Palestinian ambassador in Pretoria is the official representative of the Palestinian government to the Government of South Africa.

== List of representatives ==
Diplomatic accreditation	Ambassador		Observations	President of Palestine	President of South Africa	Term end
Diplomatic accreditation	Name in Arabic	Name in English	Observations	President of Palestine	President of South Africa	Term end
1995	سلمان محمد حسين الهرفي	Salman El-Herfi		Yasser Arafat Mahmoud Abbas	Nelson Mandela Thabo Mbeki	2005
2005	علي أحمد حليمة	Ali Ahmed Halima		Mahmoud Abbas	Thabo Mbeki Kgalema Motlanthe	16 September 2012
2012	عبد الحفيظ نوفل	Abdel Hafiz Nofal		Mahmoud Abbas	Jacob Zuma	June 2015
2015	هاشم حسن هاشم الدجاني	Hashem Hassan Dajani		Mahmoud Abbas	Jacob Zuma Matamela Cyril Ramaphosa	2019
28 January 2020	حنان نعيم أمين جرار	Hanan Na'eem Ameen Jarrar		Mahmoud Abbas	Matamela Cyril Ramaphosa	
