= Carl Naether =

German-origin professor of English

Carl Albert Naether (27 April 1892 – 28 January 1990) was a German-origin professor of English at the University of Southern California, an author of texts on business writing, and an amateur aviculturist who specialized in the doves and pigeons. He wrote The Book of the Pigeon and of Wild Foreign Doves (1939) which went into five editions.

Naether was born in Torgau where his father was a land surveyor. Trips with his father into the countryside made him interested in natural history. He studied at the University of Iowa, University of California, Berkeley and University of Michigan. He became a professor of English in 1924 at the University of Southern California. He began to rear doves and pigeons while living in the San Fernando Valley, California. He was known for his ability to maintain rare birds and with numerous longevity records in captivity. He published a major work on the doves and pigeons in captivity first published in 1939 and going into five editions. Other books that he wrote include Advertising to Women (1928) and The business letter; its principles and problems (1923).

In 1990, he tried to visit his hometown but was denied a visa by the East German authorities. He died following a fall.
