= Ahmed Jarrar =

Jordanian journalist (born 1976)

- Born: 1976 (age 49–50)
- Education: Al Zarqa'a university
- Awards: 3rd place photography competition

Ahmed Jarrar (Arabic: أحمد جرار) Jordanian activist (born in Al Zarq'aa year 1976), Bachelor of Computer Programming from Zarqa University, works as a reporter and news producer at the office of Al-Jazeera Channel, Doha.

== Career ==
In Hazeran / June 2011 during the revolution of Arab Spring, Ahmed Jarrar's car got broken by unknown assailants in front of his house, when working as reporter for Al Jazeera channel in Amman. Later in a press interview, Jarrar admitted that he believed the reason behind the attack was based on his role in Al Jazeera's coverage of events taking place at the time.

Ahmed Jarrar was an active social media member and got involved in many media campaigns, especially the ones related to the Palestinian case including his participation in (Instill a right) and other campaigns organized in Palestinian Land Day.

== Awards ==
Ahmed Jarrar, a reporter on Al Jazeera channel in Amman, won third place in a photography competition organized by Al Jazeera network itself, on its sixteenth year launching anniversary. In response to his victory, Jarrar confirmed that "the beauty of this victory was it being announced at the ceremony held by Al Jazeera in Doha with the attendance of many Al Jazeera stars". The photo for which Ahmed won a rank was taken in Mogadishu, capital of Somalia, while covering the famine there. Ahmed was honoured along with Muhammad Al-Najjar from Amman office, who was injured while covering the daily reports of the Syrian revolution in Aleppo for Al Jazeera net platform.

== Criticism ==
Jarrar and other Jordanian activists in Al Jazeera channel were criticised for their silence when hosting the spokesperson of the Israeli army on the channel, especially after him and other journalists including the manager Yaser Abo Helala expressed their criticism towards Gulf countries, mostly Saudi Arabia and the UAE regarding normalization.
