= Qwelane v South African Human Rights Commission =

South African legal case

- Court: Constitutional Court of South Africa
- Full case name: Jonathan Dubula Qwelane v South African Human Rights Commission and Another
- Decided: 30 July 2021
- Docket nos.: CCT 13/20
- Citations: [2021] ZACC 22; 2021 (6) SA 579 (CC); 2022 (2) BCLR 129 (CC)

Case history
- Prior actions: Qwelane v South African Human Rights Commission and Another [2019] ZASCA 167 in the Supreme Court of Appeal
- Appealed from: South African Human Rights Commission v Qwelane; Qwelane v Minister for Justice and Correctional Services [2017] ZAGPJHC 218 in the High Court, Gauteng Division and Equality Court
- Related actions: Psychological Society of South Africa v Qwelane and Others [2016] ZACC 48

Court membership
- Judges sitting: Khampepe J, Madlanga J, Majiedt J, Mhlantla J, Theron J, Tshiqi J, Mathopo AJ, Victor AJ

Case opinions
- Section 10(1) of the Promotion of Equality and Prevention of Unfair Discrimination Act, 2000 is unconstitutional insofar as it includes the term "hurtful" as part of the definition of prohibited hate speech.
- Decision by: Majiedt J (unanimous)

Keywords
- Freedom of expression; hate speech; overbreadth; Promotion of Equality and Prevention of Unfair Discrimination Act

Qwelane v South African Human Rights Commission and Another is a 2021 decision of the Constitutional Court of South Africa on the constitutionality of a statutory prohibition on hate speech. The court found that section 10(1) of the Promotion of Equality and Prevention of Unfair Discrimination Act 4 of 2000 was unconstitutional insofar as it included the vague term "hurtful" as part of the definition of prohibited hate speech.

The matter was heard on 22 December 2020 and decided on 30 July 2021 in a unanimous decision written by Justice Steven Majiedt. It arose from an application for confirmation of an order of constitutional invalidity granted by the Supreme Court of Appeal in 2019 on appeal from the High Court and Equality Court, where the South African Human Rights Commission had charged journalist Jon Qwelane with hate speech after he published a homophobic newspaper column. Though it struck down part of section 10(1) of the Equality Act, the Constitutional Court nonetheless found that Qwelane's statements constituted hate speech and that the prohibition on such speech was a justifiable limitation on the constitutional right to freedom of expression.

== Background ==
On 20 July 2008, the Sunday Sun newspaper published an article by columnist Jon Qwelane entitled "Call me names – but gay is NOT okay…". In the article, Qwelane objected to permissive contemporary attitudes towards homosexual relationships between men, calling such attitudes part of the "rapid degradation of values and traditions by the so-called liberal influences of nowadays" and pleading with politicians to "muster the balls to rewrite the Constitution of this country, to excise those sections which give licence to men 'marrying' other men, and ditto women". The article was illustrated by a cartoon which compared homosexuality to bestiality.

Following a public outcry, the South African Human Rights Commission referred a complaint of hate speech against Qwelane to the Equality Court, where the commission was represented by Tembeka Ngcukaitobi SC.

== Prior actions ==
In the Equality Court, the Human Rights Commission alleged that Qwelane's article constituted hate speech as defined in section 10(1) of the Promotion of Equality and Prevention of Unfair Discrimination Act 4 of 2000 (the Equality Act, or PEPUDA), which read:

Subject to the proviso in section 12, no person may publish, propagate, advocate or communicate words based on one or more of the prohibited grounds, against any person, that could reasonably be construed to demonstrate a clear intention to—

1. be hurtful;
2. be harmful or to incite harm;
3. promote or propagate hatred.

In response, Qwelane challenged the constitutionality of section 10(1) of the Equality Act, arguing that, read with other provisions of the act, it was impermissibly vague and imposed an unjustifiably broad limitation on the constitutional right to freedom of expression. This challenge was consolidated with the Human Rights Commission's hate speech case and the two claims were heard together before a single judge, Moshidi J, sitting both in the Equality Court and in the High Court of South Africa.

In August 2017, Moshidi found against Qwelane, dismissing his constitutional challenge and declaring his statements as hate speech as envisaged in section 10(1) of the Equality Act. Qwelane was ordered to tender an unconditional written apology to the LGBTI community and to pay costs.

Qwelane appealed the High Court's decision to the Supreme Court of Appeal, which upheld his appeal on 29 November 2019. In a unanimous judgment written by Judge Mahomed Navsa, the Supreme Court found merit in Qwelane's argument that section 10(1) was vague and unconstitutional on the grounds of overbreadth, as it licensed violations of the right to freedom of expression. The appellate court therefore dismissed the hate speech complaint against Qwelane and referred its order of constitutional invalidity for confirmation in the Constitutional Court of South Africa.

== Judgement ==
In a unanimous judgment penned by Justice Steven Majiedt, the Constitutional Court dealt, firstly, with the proper interpretation of section 10(1) of the Equality Act; secondly, with the vagueness (and therefore unconstitutionality) of section 10(1) as properly interpreted; and, thirdly, with the merit of the hate speech complaint against Qwelane in terms of section 10(1).

On the interpretation question, the Constitutional Court held that section 10(1) imposes an objective test, rather than a subjective test, for hate speech. A "clear intention" to incite hurt, harm, or hatred exists insofar as it would be imputed by a reasonable person reading the statement in question. The test therefore depends on assessing the objective effect of the text rather than the subjective intention of the author. In this, the Constitutional Court confirmed the reading of the High Court in South African Human Rights Commission v Khumalo. Dealing with an ambiguity in the syntax of section 10(1), the court also agreed with Khumalo that paragraphs (a) to (c) of section 10(1) should be read conjunctively, rather than disjunctively as proposed by the Supreme Court. According to Majiedt, a disjunctive reading would unjustifiably limit the right to freedom of expression.

On the vagueness question, the Constitutional Court held that the term "hurtful" as used in paragraph 10(1)(a) was indeed vague and that, in application, it imposed an unjustifiable and unconstitutional limitation on the right to freedom of expression. However, the court found that the other elements of the hate speech test – intent to cause or incite harm, and intent to promote or propagate hatred – were not vague and were proportional to the purpose of the hate speech limitation. The court therefore struck down paragraph 10(1)(a).

In adjudicating the hate speech complaint against Qwelane, the court relied on the remaining, constitutionally compliant elements of section 10(1). It found that Qwelane's statements demonstrated an intention to harm the LGBTI community and advocate hatred against them on the basis of their sexual orientation. His statements therefore constituted hate speech.

== Reactions ==
Legal commentators welcomed the Constitutional Court's clarification of the application of the Equality Act in defining prohibited hate speech.
