= Nather Jarrar =

Jordanian football player and coach (born 1984)

Personal information
- Date of birth: 28 August 1987 (age 39)
- Place of birth: Amman, Jordan
- Height: 1.76 m (5 ft 9 in)
- Position: Attacking midfielder

Team information
- Current team: Treaty United

College career
| Years | Team | Apps | (Gls) |
| 2007–2008 | Concordia Stingers | | |

Senior career*
| Years | Team | Apps | (Gls) |
| 1999 | Al-Hussein Irbid | | |
| 2006 | Al-Wehdat | | |
| 2006–2007 | Lakeshore | | |
| 2008–2009 | Al-Ahli Amman | | |
| 2009 | Al-Baqa'a | | |

Managerial career
- 2012–2014: Villarreal (academy)
- 2014–2016: Al-Ahli (assistant)
- 2016–2017: Al-Ahli
- 2017–2018: Al-Faisaly
- 2018–2019: Mont-Royal Outremont (assistant)
- 2019–2021: Al-Salt (assistant)
- 2021: Al-Faisaly (assistant)
- 2021–2022: Whitecaps FC (academy)
- 2023–2024: Al-Faisaly (coach)
- 2024–: Treaty United
- * Club domestic league appearances and goals

Nather Jarrar (Arabic: ناثر جرار; is a professional football coach and former player. He is currently the Academy Manager with Treaty United.

== Playing career ==
Jarrar started his career at Al-Hussein in 1999, before deciding to concentrate on his studies in Canada. He returned to Jordan on 9 January 2006, signing for Al-Wehdat. Jarrar then moved back to Canada, playing for Lakeshore SC and Concordia Stingers, before returning to Jordan in 2007 at Al-Ahli. He joined Al-Baqa'a in 2009.

== Managerial career ==
Nather is the founder of football club Amman FC In Jordan. He acquired his UEFA C license in Reading with The Football Association in 2010, the UEFA B License in 2013, and the UEFA A License in 2017 with the Football Association of Ireland in Dublin.

Nather worked at the Villarreal CF Academy learning the Spanish Methodology of the yellow submarines. He also worked as an interim with the Men's First Team where he learned and developed in the Spanish Methodology under Marcelino Garcia Toral that was appointed the clubs Manager at the time.

Nather coached his former club Al-Ahli as an assistant coach. Upon the end of the first leg of the 2017–18 season, Al-Faisaly appointed Jarrar as assistant coach. Jarrar became one of the youngest coaches in the club's history. During the 2018 season, Canadian club Mont-Royal Outremont, who played in the Première Ligue de soccer du Québec, appointed Jarrar as assistant coach. In October 2019, Jarrar was appointed assistant coach of newly promoted Jordanian Pro League club Al Salt SC, as the assistant of Jamal Abu-Abed.

On 1 February 2021, Jarrar was appointed assistant coach of Al-Faisaly. On 8 November 2021, he was announced head coach of the academy of Major League Soccer club Whitecaps FC.

On January 6, 2023, Nather returned to the Blue Eagles and announced joining the Technical Staff re uniting with the Clubs Manager Jamal Abu Abed.

Nather won his very first trophy with Al-Faisaly during 2023 season. The Club won the FA Shield Cup with an undefeated eleven game record.
