= Palestine–South Africa relations =

- Palestine: South Africa

Palestine–South Africa relations refer to the interstate relations between the Republic of South Africa and the State of Palestine.

== History ==
=== Bilateral relations ===
The African National Congress had close relations with Palestine Liberation Organization. Nelson Mandela had close relations with Yasser Arafat. After the first non-racial elections in 1994, South Africa established diplomatic relations with the State of Palestine on February 15, 1995. Former South African President Nelson Mandela had visited both Israel and Palestine and called for peace between both sides. Nevertheless, some prominent South African figures, such as Desmond Tutu and Ronnie Kasrils have criticized Israel's treatment of the Palestinians, drawing parallels between apartheid South Africa and modern-day Israel. The Congress of South African Trade Unions, which represents 1.2 million South African workers, has also accused Israel of practicing apartheid and supported the boycott launched by the Canadian Union of Public Employees, as well as the boycott of all Israeli products.

=== 2008-09 Gaza War and after ===
During the 2008 to 2009 Gaza War, South Africa's Deputy Minister of Foreign Affairs Fatima Hajaig called on Israel to stop military attacks in Gaza and withdraw its forces from the border immediately, saying, "The South African government finds the continued siege on Gaza unacceptable as it does not allow humanitarian relief supply such as medicine, food and water to reach the desperate people of Gaza." "The South African government unequivocally and in the strongest possible terms condemns the escalation of violence on the part of Israel brought about by the launching Saturday night of a ground invasion into Gaza," read a statement issued by the Department of Foreign Affairs after the start of Israel's ground offensive. South Africa said that, "the violent situation in Gaza and southern Israel made it imperative for the [UN General] Assembly to collectively and publicly voice its condemnation of the attacks and demand that both sides immediately cease their military attacks." The country made a similar call in the UN Security Council.

After the Gaza flotilla raid on 31 May 2010, the South African Department of International Relations and Cooperation issued a statement "strongly condemning all military aggression by Israel against innocent civilians, including those in the occupied West Bank and Gaza." On 3 June, South Africa recalled its ambassador from Israel, and the Israeli ambassador was summoned to the Department of International Relations and Cooperation for a reprimand. During the 2014 Israel-Gaza conflict, The Department's spokesman, Clayson Monyela, stated that the country "strongly urge all sides to refrain from responding to violence with violence and to exercise restraint, including a halt to the arbitrary arrest of Palestinian civilians and the use of collective punishment on Palestinians."

=== Gaza war (2023-present) ===
Following the start of the Gaza War, South Africa's foreign ambassador for the Netherlands, Vusimuzi Madonsela, stated at hearings at the International Court of Justice in 2024 that Israel is responsible for apartheid against Palestinians, and that Israel's occupation of the country is illegal. Vusimuzi also stated “South Africa bears a special obligation, both to its own people and the international community, to ensure that wherever the egregious and offensive practices of apartheid occur, these must be called out for what they are and brought to an immediate end,”.

On 5 April 2024, the court set the schedule for comprehensive submissions of legal opinions by South Africa and Israel. Time limit for the South African memorial was set to be 28 October 2024, and for the Israeli response 28 July 2025. South Africa responded on 28 October 2024 and on 14 April 2025, the ICJ extended the deadline for Israel's response to 12 January 2026.

At the start of the war, the government of South Africa faced media scrutiny over its delayed condemnation of Hamas for the October 7 attacks. Reports also surfaced alleging that the South African government had prior knowledge of the attacks, and that South African Minister Naledi Pandor had a telephone conversation with Hamas leader Ismail Haniyeh. The phone call was described as "embarrassing" for President Cyril Ramaphosa as it was made without his "prior knowledge". On 16 October 2023, an ANC official resigned, alleging that the party "supported Hamas" and had waited nine days to denounce the October 7 attacks, while President Ramaphosa reiterated the ANC's continued solidarity with Palestinians.

== See also ==
- Foreign relations of South Africa
- Foreign relations of Palestine
- Palestinian genocide accusation
