= Promotion of Access to Information Act, 2000 =

South African freedom of information law

Parliament of South Africa
- Long title: Act to give effect to the constitutional right of access to any information held by the State and any information that is held by another person and that is required for the exercise or protection of any rights; and to provide for matters connected therewith.
- Citation: Act No. 2 of 2000
- Territorial extent: Republic of South Africa
- Enacted by: Parliament of South Africa
- Assented to: 2 February 2000
- Commenced: 9 March 2001

Amended by
- Promotion of Access to Information Amendment Act, 2019

Keywords
- Freedom of information
- Status: In force

The Promotion of Access to Information Act, 2000 (or PAIA; Act No. 2 of 2000) is a freedom of information law in South Africa. It gives the constitutional right of access to any information held by the State and any information held by private bodies that is required for the exercise and protection of any rights.

The Act was previously enforced by the South African Human Rights Commission (SAHRC), but since 1 July 2021 has been enforced by the Information Regulator.

== Role of Information Officers ==
In terms of PAIA, information officers have a critical role of ensuring the implementation of the Act, by:

- Receiving and responding to PAIA requests
- Compiling and submitting Section 14 manuals to the SAHRC
- Compiling and submitting Section 15 notices to the Minister of Justice and Correctional Services
- Compiling and submitting Section 32 reports to the SAHRC

== Compliance ==
Every private body must publish a simple manual in line with Section 51 of the Act. The manual assists persons who wish to request access to information by providing them with the procedures involved, as prescribed by the Act.

Much of the South African public and private sectors have yet to comply with this legislation.

=== Reasons for Non-Compliance ===
In terms of public bodies, various concerns have been cited as reasons for non-compliance, such as:

- Lack of awareness by public bodies about their duties in terms of the Act;
- Public bodies not taking their obligations in terms of PAIA seriously;
- Poor information management systems (no records management policies and file plans) in public bodies;
- Failure to delegate information officers’ powers within the public bodies; and
- Inability to identify the Unit or Division to be responsible for administering PAIA

Thus, in light of these challenges, which are major factors hampering proper implementation of a successful access to information regime in South Africa, the cross-sectoral National Information Officers Forum was established on 20 September 2006.

=== Exemption from Compliance by Private Bodies ===
On 26 November 2015, the SAHRC received notice from the office of the Minister of Justice and Correctional Services confirming that certain private bodies would be further exempted from compiling and submitting the manual contemplated in section 51 for a period of five years starting from 1 January 2016. Private bodies include companies that are not private companies in terms of the Companies Act as well as those that are private companies, but are in specific sectors, have a certain number of employees and turn over a specific amount in each financial year.

The exemption was gazetted in Government Gazette No. 39504 (GN 1222) on 11 December 2015.

Despite the exemption in place, private bodies are still encouraged to comply with the Act.

Private bodies that are not exempted must still ensure their manuals have been compiled and lodged with the SAHRC.

== National Information Officers Forum ==
Tha National Information officers Forum (NIOF) is an annual convention that is hosted in partnership with the Open Democracy Advice Centre (ODAC) and marks the International Right to Know Day held in September of each year.

The motivation behind the conference is to provide a platform on which information officers (and their appointed delegates) and PAIA implementers can interact with experts on the matter, share challenges and experiences of implementation, and share best-practice tools.

The form has been used a means to:

- raise awareness; facilitate responsiveness and openness through information sharing;
- cultivate a culture of social justice and respect for human rights within multiple levels of government;
- keep Information Officers and Deputy Information Officers abreast of developments in PAIA and International trends in access to information;
- give Information Officers and Deputy Information Officers the opportunity to engage with the SAHRC and to inform the work of the SAHRC;
- provide academics and policy makers with insight on practical impediments in implementation;
- provide Deputy Information Officers time and space necessary to organize themselves through coordinating Committees;
- reward and honour best practice; and
- accelerate the implementation of PAIA.

== Coordination Committee ==
Elected by the NOIF, the Coordination Committee is composed of deputy information officers from the various tiers of South African government, as well as representatives from civil society, and is tasked with the activity-oversight of the NOIF, as well as the establishment of forums on a provincial level.

Additionally, the committee must represent the interests of deputy information officers and inform of interventions to accelerate the awareness and implementation of the Act through the secretariat (the SAHRC).

== Amendments ==
- Promotion of Access to Information Amendment Act, 2019
