= Promotion of Equality and Prevention of Unfair Discrimination Act, 2000 =

2000 South African anti-discrimination law

Parliament of South Africa
- Long title: Act to give effect to section 9 read with item 23 (1) of Schedule 6 to the Constitution of the Republic of South Africa, 1996, so as to prevent and prohibit unfair discrimination and harassment; to promote equality and eliminate unfair discrimination; to prevent and prohibit hate speech; and to provide for matters connected therewith.
- Citation: Act No. 4 of 2000
- Territorial extent: Republic of South Africa
- Enacted by: Parliament of South Africa
- Assented to: 2 February 2000
- Commenced: 1 September 2000 / 16 June 2003

Legislative history
- Bill title: Promotion of Equality and Prevention of Unfair Discrimination Bill
- Bill citation: B57—1999
- Introduced by: Penuell Maduna, Minister of Justice and Constitutional Development
- Introduced: 25 October 1999

Amended by
- Promotion of Equality and Prevention of Unfair Discrimination Amendment Act, 2002
- Status: In force

The Promotion of Equality and Prevention of Unfair Discrimination Act, 2000 (PEPUDA or the Equality Act, Act No. 4 of 2000) is a comprehensive South African anti-discrimination law. It prohibits unfair discrimination by the government and by private organisations and individuals and forbids hate speech and harassment. The act specifically lists race, gender, sex, pregnancy, family responsibility or status, marital status, ethnic or social origin, HIV/AIDS status, colour, sexual orientation, age, disability, religion, conscience, belief, culture, language and birth as "prohibited grounds" for discrimination, but also contains criteria that courts may apply to determine which other characteristics are prohibited grounds. Employment discrimination is excluded from the ambit of the act because it is addressed by the Employment Equity Act, 1998. The act establishes the divisions of the High Court and designated Magistrates' Courts as "Equality Courts" to hear complaints of discrimination, hate speech and harassment.

== Background ==
Section Nine of the Constitution of South Africa contains a guarantee of equality and a prohibition of public and private discrimination. It obliges the national government to enact legislation to prohibit discrimination, and a transitional clause required this legislation to be enacted by 4 February 2000, three years after the constitution came into force. The Equality Act was assented to by the President on 2 February 2000; it was enacted alongside two other laws similarly required by the constitution: the Promotion of Access to Information Act (PAIA), dealing with freedom of information, and the Promotion of Administrative Justice Act (PAJA), dealing with justice in administrative law.

== See also ==
- Qwelane v South African Human Rights Commission
