= South African contract law =

Law about agreements between two or more parties

South African contract law is a modernised form of Roman-Dutch law rooted in canon and Roman legal traditions. It governs agreements between two or more parties who intend to create legally enforceable obligations. This legal framework supports private enterprise in South Africa by ensuring agreements are upheld and, if necessary, enforced, while promoting fair dealing. Influenced by English law and shaped by the Constitution of South Africa, contract law balances freedom of contract with public policy considerations, such as fairness and constitutional values.

== Nature ==
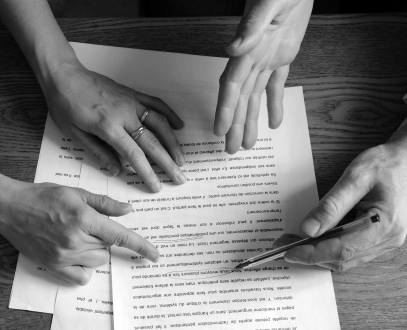
A contract is any enforceable obligationary agreement.

A contract in South Africa is narrowly classified as an obligationary agreement—it creates enforceable obligations—and ought therefore to be distinguished from liberatory agreements (which discharge obligations; e.g. release, novation), real agreements (which transfer rights; e.g. cession, deed of transfer), and family law agreements (which govern family matters; e.g. marriage settlements). Contracts underpin transactions by providing certainty and recourse in disputes, regulated by principles of good faith and public policy.

=== Requirements ===
For a contract to be considered valid and binding in South Africa, the following requirements must be met:

1. There must be consensus ad idem between the contracting parties.
2. The parties must have seriously intended the agreement to result in terms which can be enforced.
3. The parties must have the capacity to contract.
4. The agreement must have certain and definite terms.
5. The necessary formalities must be observed.
6. The agreement must be lawful.
7. The contractual obligations must be possible of performance.
8. The content of the agreement must be certain.
9. The contract must be legally binding

The requirements are discussed in greater detail below.

=== Characteristics ===
A contract has certain characteristic features:

- It is a bilateral juristic act. The law attaches the consequences intended by the parties. The parties should be aware that they are creating a legal obligation between them.
- It can be unilateral, i.e. one party has a duty to perform, or bilateral or multilateral, i.e. both parties have a duty to perform.
- It is an obligationary agreement. It entails undertakings or forbearances, on one or both sides, to tender certain performances: that is, to give (dare), to do (facere) or not to do (non facere). Alternatively, it may be a warranty that a certain state of affairs exists.
- If bilateral, it is usually synallagmatic (or reciprocal), meaning that one party's performance is promised in exchange for the performance of the other party.

The modern concept of contract is generalised so that an agreement does not have to conform to a specific type to be enforced, but contracting parties are required to conduct their relationship in good faith (bona fides).

=== Contract and the law of obligations ===
Contract law forms part of the law of obligations. An obligation is a legal bond (vinculum iuris) between two or more parties, obliging the obligor (the "debtor") to give, do or refrain from doing something to or for the obligee (the "creditor"). The right created by an obligation is personal, a ius in personam, as opposed to a real right (ius in re). The words "creditor" and "debtor" apply not only in respect of a claim for money, but to a claim for anything else that is owed—whether unconditionally, conditionally, or in the future. If an obligation is enforceable by action in a court, it is a civil obligation, rather than the less common and unenforceable natural obligation. "The most important point", in discussing the legal effect of contracts, is "the duty of the parties to perform their obligations".

==== Contract and delict ====
The primary sources of obligations are contract and delict, the latter being wrongful and blameworthy conduct that harms a person. There is a close similarity between a breach of contract and a delict, in that both are civil wrongs and may give rise to a duty to pay damages as compensation. It is unsurprising, then, that certain conduct may constitute both a breach of contract and a delict (as when, in Van Wyk v Lewis, a surgeon negligently left a cotton swab inside a patient's body), in which case there is concurrent liability, permitting the plaintiff to sue on either basis.

==== Contract and quasi-contract ====
Another source of obligations is quasi-contract, in which rights and duties arise from something other than consensus. One example is unjustified enrichment, which occurs when wealth shifts from one person's patrimony to another's without legal justification. Where a party transfers an asset to another in performance of a contract that is for some reason invalid, the shift of wealth is without good cause (or sine causa), and an enrichment action for the restitution of the asset lies. The other main types of quasi-contract are negotiorum gestio and indebiti solutio.

=== Contract and property law ===
Many commercial transactions involve both the law of obligations and property law, and so have both proprietary and obligationary elements. A contract of sale, for instance, obliges the seller to deliver the thing being sold to the buyer. As such, it is the causa traditionis, or underlying reason, for the subsequent transfer of ownership. It does not, however, effect the transfer, which is accomplished by the real agreement (the concurring intentions of the parties to make and receive transfer of ownership). If the underlying contract is invalid, ownership nonetheless passes, because South African law adheres to the abstract rather than the causal system of transfer. The transferor, however, generally has the option of a restitutionary action to recover the property.

=== Historical development of contract ===
==== Roman law ====
Roman law had a closed system of contracts which recognised only four types (e.g. contracts consensu, re, verbis and litteris) that were binding only if "clothed" in special forms and formulas; in other words, Roman law had "a law of contracts, rather than of contract". This distinguishes it from the modern practice of regarding any obligationary agreement meeting certain general requirements as an enforceable contract. Only for contracts consensu (e.g. sale, lease, partnership and mandate) was mutual assent (consensus ad idem) "clothed" in solemnities sufficient to make the agreement enforceable. Any agreement that did not rigidly conform to the four types was referred to as a nudum pactum and was not actionable unless there had been part performance. The development of contracts consensu was prompted by the commercial needs of the growing Roman state, but Roman law never reached the point of enforcing all serious and deliberate agreements as contracts.

==== Roman-Dutch law ====
The Roman-Dutch law of contract, on the other hand, is based on canon and natural laws. Adopting the canonist position, all contracts were said to be an exchange of promises that were consensual and bonae fidei, that is, based simply on mutual assent and good faith. Taking the Christian view that it is a sin to break one's promise, canon lawyers developed the pacta sunt servanda principle under which all serious agreements ought to be enforced, regardless of whether there had been compliance with strict formalities as prescribed by secular law. Under the causa theory, for the contract to be binding it had to have a iusta causa, or lawful motive in line with Christian moral imperatives, arising not only from a lawful or just right, title, or cause of action, but also from love and affection, moral consideration, or past services. A nudum pactum was redefined as any agreement unenforceable for lack of causa. All of these principles were applied uniformly through European ecclesiastical courts.

In keeping with Enlightenment values, natural lawyers stripped away the Christian morality from contract law. They redefined a contract as a concurrence of wills, and each party's "promise" was now seen as a declaration of will devoid of moral obligation (will theory). In place of iusta causa developed a general principle of binding force under which any valid contract was both binding and actionable. Canonist substantive fairness shifted to procedural fairness, so good faith and mutual assent were retained as requirements, but just price and laesio enormis were not. Under English rule, public policy was substituted for bonos mores.

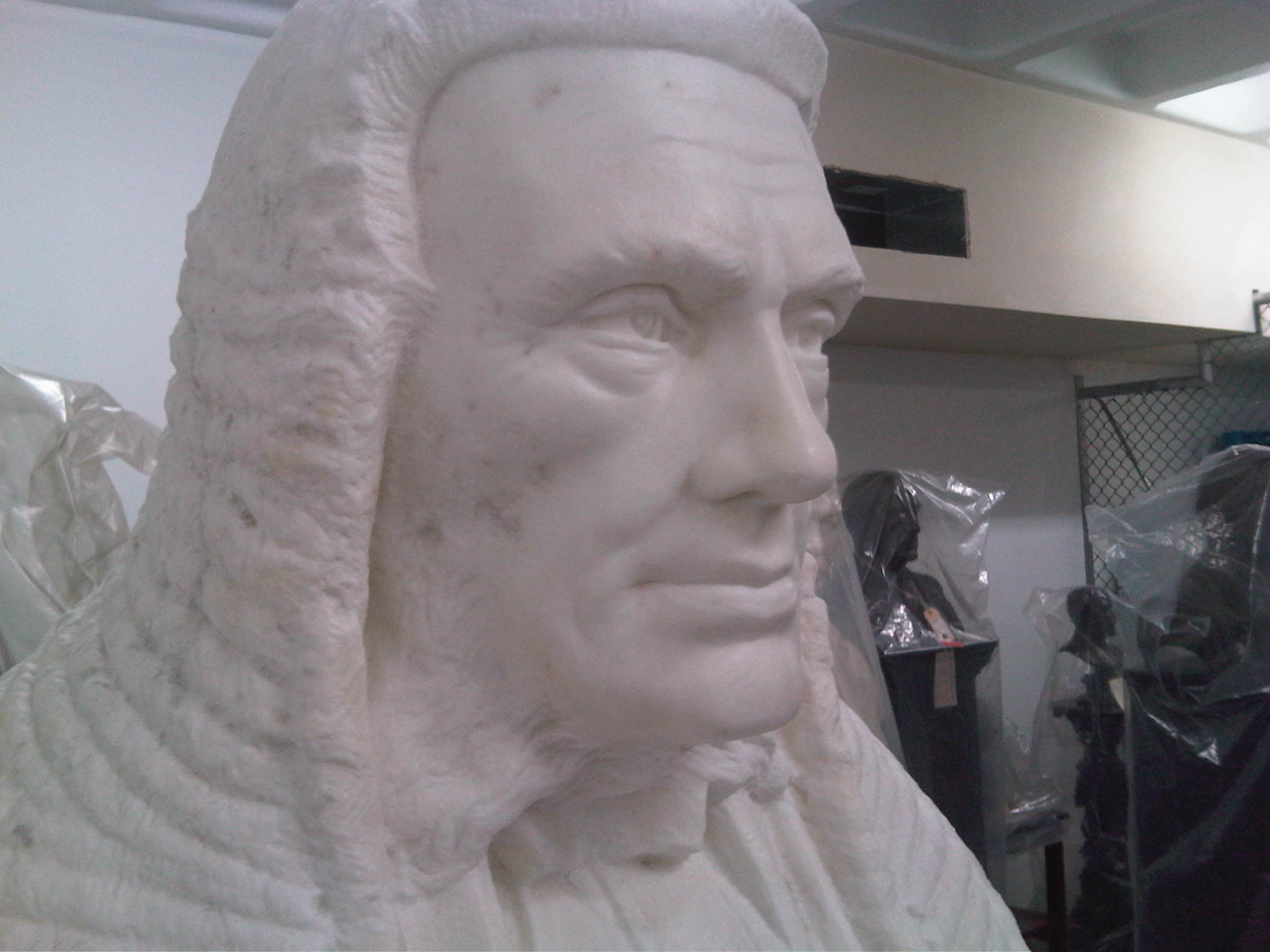
In the late 19th century and influenced by English law and Lord John de Villiers CJ, the courts reinterpreted iusta causa as valuable consideration and necessary for a valid contract.

==== Causa and consideration ====
Initially under Roman-Dutch law the broad notion of iusta causa was necessary to create obligations; therefore, for a contract to be enforceable, it had to be shown to be based on a causa. However, by the 17th century and under the influence of the usus modernus pandectarum, the general principle of binding force had become the rule in the Netherlands. By contrast, under English law, a contract required not causa but rather valuable consideration (ex titulo oneroso). This led to differing practice between, on the one hand, Roman-Dutch law jurisdictions applying either iusta causa or the general principle of binding force, and, on the other, English law jurisdictions applying the doctrine of consideration. During English rule, this difference gave rise to a celebrated dispute in early South African law.

In the late 19th century, under the general influence of English law 'and the particular dominating influence of John de Villiers CJ’, the courts reinterpreted iusta causa to be valuable consideration and necessary for a valid contract. This was met with fierce resistance by northern Afrikaner jurists like John Gilbert Kotzé, and later rejected outright by the Transvaal Supreme Court in Rood v Wallach (1904) which applied a general principle of binding force. De Villiers, however, refused to concede the point, so that the dispute continued until 1919, almost 50 years after it began, it was settled by the Appellate Division of the South African Supreme Court in the famous case of Conradie v Rossouw, where the court took the Transvaal view that a binding contract may be constituted by any serious and deliberate agreement made with the intention of creating a legal obligation, and in so doing, simultaneously abolished the iusta causa and consideration doctrines. It seems now to be clear that a causa, be it onerous (ex titulo oneroso) or gratuitous (ex causa lucrativa), is not a separate requirement in the South African law of contract. 'That a contract, in order to be valid, must have been seriously intended by the parties [as well as the other obvious elements such as lawful and performable], is a matter of course ... [and] does not need causa as an independent element'.

== Basis ==
=== Actual subjective agreement ===
Genuine agreement (or consensus) as the basis for contractual obligations, presupposes an actual mutual assent of the parties. Subjective consensus of this nature exists when all the parties involved:

- Seriously intend to contract (animus contrahendi);
- Are of one mind (or ad idem) as to the contract's material terms; and
- Are conscious of the fact that their minds have met.

=== Objective agreement ===
Where there is a divergence between the true intention and the expressed or perceived intention of the parties, the question of whether or not a legal system will uphold a contract depends on its approach to contract: Is it subjective (focused on an actual consensus), or is it apparent or objective (focused on the external appearance of agreement)?

== Theories of contract ==
=== Will theory ===
The will theory of contract postulates an extremely subjective approach to contract, whereby consensus is the only basis for contractual liability. The upshot is that, if there is no genuine concurrence of wills, there can be no contract. It is generally agreed, though, that unqualified adherence to this theory would produce results both unfair and economically disastrous.

=== Declaration theory ===
The declaration theory, in contrast, stipulates that the only important consideration is the external manifestation of the parties' wills. The true basis of contract, then, is to be found in the concurring declarations of the parties, not in what they actually think or intend. This extremely objective approach has also generally been found to be unacceptable in practice, unless it is qualified.

=== Reliance theory ===
In terms of the compromise reliance theory, the basis of contract is to be found in a reasonable belief, induced by the conduct of the other party, in the existence of consensus. This protects a party's reasonable expectation of a contract. The reliance theory should be seen as a supplement to the will theory, affording an alternative basis for contract in circumstances where the minds of the parties have not truly met.

=== South African approach ===
South African law, with its Roman-Dutch roots, but strongly influenced by English law, has vacillated between a subjective and an objective approach to contract. It is now clear, however, that the subjective will theory is the point of departure; in cases of dissensus, the shortcomings of that theory are corrected by an application of the reliance theory.

=== Proving the existence of a contract ===
The onus of proving the existence of a contract rests on the person who alleges that the contract exists.

== Cornerstones ==
Fundamental concepts in the law of contract include:

- Freedom of contract
- Sanctity of contract
- Good faith
- Privity of contract

There is mounting competition between them. As Hutchison and Pretorius (2009) note, 'The law of contract is currently undergoing a process of quite profound change and renewal as it adapts to meet the demands of the new constitutional era in South Africa'. Freedom of contract especially is under pressure, as the courts are increasingly willing to use public policy as grounds to strike down unfair contracts. The legislature, too, is willing to intervene in private contracts in the interests of fairness, most notably with the National Credit Act and the Consumer Protection Act. The latter prohibits certain terms or conditions outright, with the result that they are void to the extent of non-compliance. Where terms are not prohibited outright, they are subject to a requirement of fairness and reasonableness.

All law, including the common law of contract, is subject to constitutional control. The Constitution therefore exerts a strong if indirect influence on the law of contract: 'The principles of administrative justice frame the contractual relationship, it has been said, and the Constitution requires that all administrative action must be lawful, reasonable and procedurally fair'. To what extent the Constitution can be invoked directly to challenge the validity of a contractual provision between private parties is a contentious question. The Constitutional Court appears to prefer an indirect application of the Constitution between private parties: an approach that tests the validity of a private contractual provision against the requirements of public policy, but also recognises that public policy is now determined with reference to the fundamental values embodied in the Constitution, and particularly in the Bill of Rights. The courts have shown a willingness to intervene if a party exercises a contractual power in a manner that fails to respect the constitutional rights of another party, and may even, in appropriate circumstances, be willing to compel one party to contract with another on constitutional grounds.

== Offer and acceptance ==
The rules of offer and acceptance constitute a useful, but not essential, analytical tool in understanding the formation of contracts. An offer is a statement of intent in which the offeror expresses (to the person to whom the offer is conveyed) the performance and the terms to which he is prepared to bind himself. Being a unilateral declaration, an offer does not in itself give rise to a binding obligation. For an offer to be valid, it must be:

- Definite
- Complete
- Clear and certain
- Compliant with the requirements of the Consumer Protection Act, which, among other things:
  - Prohibits negative option billing and bait marketing
  - Provides for a cooling-off period for certain contracts
  - Regulates catalogue marketing

An offer is usually directed at a definite person or persons, but it may also be directed at undefined persons. An advertisement does not generally constitute an offer; it qualifies merely as an invitation to do business, although a promise of reward is a form of advertisement that does constitute an offer. The status in this regard of proposals and tenders is contingent on the intention of the parties, which is in turn determined by the circumstances of each individual case.

At a simple auction, not subject to conditions, the bidder is construed as making the offer. At an auction with reserve, the potential purchaser is construed as making the offer; at an auction without reserve, the auctioneer is construed as making the offer. An auction subject to conditions is construed as two potential contracts: The first binds the parties to the auction conditions, while the second constitutes the substantive contract of sale.

An offer lapses if:

- The offeree rejects the offer.
- The offeror revokes the offer.
- Either party dies.
- The period prescribed by the offeror expires, or—in the absence of a prescribed period—a reasonable amount of time has elapsed.

An acceptance is an expression of intent by the offeree, signifying agreement to the offer. For an acceptance to be valid, it must be:

- Unconditional
- Unequivocal
- Consciously accepted by the person to whom it was addressed
- Compliant with any formalities set by law or the offeror

When parties contract at a distance, questions arise as to when and where acceptance takes place. The general rule in South African law follows the information theory, which requires actual and conscious agreement between the contracting parties, such that agreement is established only when the offeror knows about the offeree's acceptance. The place or venue of the formation of the contract is generally where the acceptance is brought to the offeror's notice.

Exceptions to the information theory include cases where there has been an express or tacit waiver of the right to notification. Another exception is the postal contract, which is governed by the expedition theory, according to which the contract comes into being as soon as the offeree has posted the letter of acceptance. Contracts concluded by telephone are governed by the information theory, but contracts entered into by means of email or through other means of electronic communication are governed by the Electronic Communications and Transactions Act. Parties involved in negotiating a contract may generally terminate the process as they wish.

=== Pacta de contrahendo ===
A pactum de contrahendo is a contract aimed at concluding another contract. Examples include the option contract (in terms of which the grantor's right to revoke his offer is restricted) and the preference contract (whereby the grantor gives a preferential right to conclude a specific contract should he decide to conclude this contract). An option contract constitutes two offers: a substantive offer and an undertaking or option to keep the offer open. If the option holder accepts the first offer by exercising the option, the main contract is created.

An option contract is irrevocable. (Breach invokes remedies such as an interdict to enforce the contract and damages to place the option holder in the position that he would have occupied had the option been honoured.) It is terminated through the:

- Effluxion of time (prescribed or reasonable)
- Death of the grantor or grantee
- Rejection of the offer by the grantee
- Lapse of the right by any other means in law

Options may be ceded if such is the grantor's intention. The cession of an option need not be in writing; it may be made orally and without formalities—unless the substantive contract is required to comply, for instance, with the prerequisite that a sale of immovable property be in writing. Because the exercise of an option to purchase immovable property is usually by acceptance of the substantive offer, both the option and the substantive offer must be in writing.

A right of pre-emption is a type of preferential right 'to purchase at a fixed price or at a price at which the grantor is prepared to sell'. It is granted by a prospective seller to a prospective purchaser to give the purchaser right of first refusal if the prospective seller should decide to sell. A pre-emption right must comply with all the requirements for contracts in general. The capacity of the pre-emption grantor to alienate the thing in question is restricted. If the grantor breaches his undertaking to offer the thing to the holder, the holder's remedy is an interdict preventing alienation to a third party. It is uncertain, though, whether a claim by the holder for specific performance would be successful.

== Mistake ==
Whereas a concurrence of wills between the parties is usually regarded as the primary basis of contractual liability (will theory), mistake (error) in contract refers to a situation in which a contracting party acts under a misapprehension, causing disagreement (dissensus) between the parties. The courts tend to categorise a mistake as one of unilateral, mutual or common:

- Unilateral mistake occurs where only one of the parties is mistaken, while the other party is aware of the mistake.
- Mutual mistake refers to a situation in which both parties are mistaken about each other's intention and are thus at cross-purposes.
- Common mistake differs fundamentally from unilateral or mutual mistake in that it does not lead to dissensus but nonetheless results in a contract's being void on the basis of an incorrect underlying supposition.

A mistake must have influenced a party's decision to conclude a contract to be relevant. A crucial distinction in the classification of mistake is between material and non-material mistakes:

- A material mistake is an error that vitiates or negates actual consensus between the parties and, to this end, must relate to or exclude an element of consensus.
- A non-material mistake does not exclude actual agreement between the parties because it does not relate to an element of consensus.

To enter into a contract, the parties must:

1. Have a serious intention to contract (animus contrahendi);
2. Have a concurrence of wills as to the material aspects of the contract (consensus ad idem); and
3. Be conscious of their agreement.

If the parties are in disagreement about one or more of these elements, there is a material mistake.

Mistakes have historically been categorised according to type. The materiality of a mistake has been determined on the basis of the type of mistake in question:

- An error in corpore is a mistake that concerns the contract's subject matter or object of performance, and is regarded as material.
- An error in negotio is a mistake regarding the nature of the contract and is regarded as material.
- An error in persona is a mistake regarding the identity of the other party to the contract. The courts only regard this as a material mistake if the identity of a party is of vital importance to the mistaken party.
- An error in substantia is a mistake regarding an attribute or characteristic of the contract's subject matter, and is generally not regarded as material.
- Mistake as to the motive for entering into a contract is not regarded as material.
- An error iuris is a mistake of law and is not regarded as material if it relates to motive.

A denial of contractual liability in all instances where the parties are not in agreement could result in undue hardship for a party who has incurred expense in reasonable reliance on the existence of a contract, and would, furthermore, greatly affect the general reliability of contractual commitments. The courts have alternated between qualifying the subjective and objective bases of contract to solve this problem:

- The subjective approach, as encapsulated in the will theory, has been qualified by the doctrine of estoppel and its close relative, the doctrine of quasi-mutual assent or direct reliance theory.
- The declaration theory represents the objective approach as corrected by the iustus error doctrine, which is usually regarded as an indirect application of the reliance theory.

In the case of estoppel, a party (the estoppel raiser) who relies reasonably on a misrepresentation by the other party (the estoppel denier), and acts thereon to his own detriment, may hold the estoppel denier to his misrepresentation; that means, the estoppel raiser may prevent the estoppel denier from relying on the true state of affairs. A successful plea of estoppel has the effect that the misrepresented facts are upheld as if they were correct. A fictional contract, in other words, will be recognised.

The reliance theory requires a reasonable belief on the part of one party (the contract asserter), induced by the other party (the contract denier), that the latter had assented to the contract in question. This theory is similar to estoppel, but has the advantage of giving rise to an actual contract. The declaration theory, on the other hand, grounds contractual liability purely on concurring and objective declarations of will. Inner will or actual intention is irrelevant.

On an application of the iustus error approach, where there is an ostensible agreement between the parties, the contract denier bears the onus of proving that his mistake is both material and reasonable in order to be absolved from liability in terms of the apparent contract:

- A mistake is reasonable if it is caused by a positive misrepresentation on the part of the contract asserter.
- A misrepresentation by omission is only a reasonable mistake if a party has remained silent, where in law he ought to have spoken out to remove the other party's misunderstanding.
- There is some authority to the effect that a mistake is excusable if the contract denier is not to blame for the mistake, in that he behaved as a reasonable person in the circumstances would have done, and if he acted without negligence.
- An error is reasonable where the contract denier did not cause a reasonable belief in the contract asserter that he had assented to the agreement in question.

The courts, as noted earlier, have reconciled the subjective and objective approaches by regarding the iustus error approach as an indirect application of the reliance theory. The reliance theory, then, is effectively the common denominator between the will and declaration theories. It moderates the strict application of each theory either directly (as with the doctrine of quasi-mutual assent in the case of the will theory), or indirectly (as with the iustus error doctrine in the case of the declaration theory).

A common mistake differs from a unilateral or a mutual mistake in that it does not lead to dissensus, but nonetheless results in a contract's being void: Both parties make the same mistake, with the important proviso that the mistake does not relate to the intention of either party; in fact, the parties completely agree, but are both mistaken about some underlying and fundamental fact relating to the past or present. For a common error to have an effect on a contract, it must qualify as a term of the contract, either expressly or tacitly, by implication.

A legal instrument that incorrectly records the contract between two parties may be rectified to conform to the common intention. In such a case, there is consensus ad idem; what is rectified is not the contract itself as a juristic act (negotium), but rather the instrument (instrumentum) in question, because it does not embody what the parties intended to be the content of their agreement.

== Improperly-obtained consensus ==
Where a person enters into a contract on the strength of a misrepresentation made to him, or as a result of duress or undue influence by the other party, the agreement is nevertheless valid because there is no dissensus. Since the consensus was improperly obtained, however, the contract is voidable at the instance of the innocent party. The remedy used to set aside a voidable contract is rescission coupled with restitution (known as restitutio in integrum), and is available as both an action and a defence. Of course, the innocent party may also elect to uphold the contract.

The conduct of the party who induces a contract by improper means frequently constitutes a delict. In such a case, the innocent party may recover damages in respect of any financial loss suffered as a result of the delict, irrespective of whether he elects to affirm or rescind the contract. Despite the contractual context, the damages are delictual in character and are assessed according to the party's negative interest.

South African law recognises the following grounds for setting aside a contract:

- Misrepresentation
- Duress
- Undue influence
- Commercial bribery

It seems likely, but is not yet certain, that further grounds will be recognised in future, in circumstances where a party's consent to a contract has been improperly obtained.

A misrepresentation is a false statement of past or present fact, not law or opinion, made by one party to another, before or at the time of the contract, concerning some matter or circumstance relating to it. Misrepresentations are classified as being fraudulent, negligent or innocent. Misrepresentations must be distinguished from:

- Warranties and contractual terms
- Opinions, predictions and statements of law
- Puffery (general laudation or simplex commendatio)
- Dicta et promissa or material statements by the seller to the buyer during negotiations, bear on the quality of the thing sold, but go beyond puffery, and give rise to the aedilitian remedies (the actio redhibitoria and the actio quanti minoris) if proven unfounded.

Misrepresentation and mistake are distinct legal concepts in the law of contract; they also give rise to distinct remedies. Mistake presupposes an absence of consensus and renders the contract void ab initio, whereas a contract induced by a misrepresentation is valid but voidable.

Irrespective of whether the misrepresentation was made fraudulently, negligently or innocently, a party is entitled to restitutio in integrum if the misrepresentation

- Was made by the other party
- Was made with the intention of inducing a contract
- In fact induced the contract
- Was material

There are two recognised types of contract-inducing fraud, namely dolus dans locum in contractui and dolus incidens in contractum. If, but for the fraud, the contract would not have been concluded at all, it is dolus dans; if there would still have been a contract, but on different terms, it is dolus incidens. Although this point has not yet been settled, dolus incidens probably gives a right only to damages, not to rescission of the contract; this is likely also to apply to an 'incidental' misrepresentation made without fraud.

Whether the contract is set aside or upheld, the represent may claim damages for any financial loss that he has suffered as a result of the misrepresentation. It makes a difference, though, whether the misrepresentation was made fraudulently, negligently or innocently. Since Ancient Roman times, it has been recognised that fraud is a delict, and that fraudulent misrepresentation accordingly gives rise to a claim for delictual damages. Only very recently was it decided that the same applies to a negligent misrepresentation. These damages, being delictual in character, are measured according to the plaintiff's negative interest and include compensation for consequential losses.

In the case of an innocent misrepresentation, there can be no claim for delictual damages, since the misrepresentation was made without fault; nor a claim for contractual damages, since there is no breach of contract—unless, that is, the representation was warranted to be true. Where the innocent misrepresentation amounts to a dictum et promissum, however, the purchaser may claim a reduction of the price under the actio quanti minoris: a limited form of relief, because not compensating for consequential losses caused by the misrepresentation.

A misrepresentation may be made by words or conduct or even silence. This last occurs when a party fails to disclose a material fact in circumstances where there is a legal duty to do so. In the past, the law recognised such a duty to speak in only a limited number of exceptional cases—where, for example, there is a special relationship of trust and confidence between the parties, as in the case of partners, or where a statute obliges a person to disclose certain information. Today, however, a general principle is emerging that requires a party to speak when the information in question is within his exclusive knowledge, and is of such a nature that the other party's right to have the information communicated would be mutually recognised by honest persons in the circumstances. A failure to speak in such circumstances entitles the other party to the same remedies as in the case of a positive misrepresentation.

Duress or metus is improper pressure that amounts to intimidation. It involves coercion of the will: A party is forced to choose between entering into a contract and suffering some harm. A party who consents to a contract under such circumstances does so out of fear inspired by an illegitimate threat. The consent is real but improperly obtained. The contract, therefore, is valid, but it may be set aside at the election of the threatened party, provided that certain requirements are met.

There is some uncertainty about what these requirements are. It is established that the threat must be unlawful or contra bonos mores, and must have induced the contract. According to some authorities, the induced party must have a reasonable fear of some imminent or inevitable harm to him- or herself, or to his property or immediate family. In the case of a threat directed at property (duress of goods), the courts have required an unequivocal protest at the time of entry into the transaction. In addition to rescission and restitution, the threatened party may recover damages in delict for any loss caused through entry into the contract.

Undue influence is also a form of improper pressure brought to bear upon a person to induce a contract, but the pressure is more subtle, involving as it does, without any threat of harm, an undermining of the will of the other party. The pressure usually emanates from a close or fiduciary relationship in which one party abuses a superior position to influence the other. To set aside a contract on the ground of undue influence, the party so affected must establish that the other party obtained an influence over him, that this influence weakened his powers of resistance and rendered his will compliant, and that the other party used this influence in an unscrupulous manner to induce an agreement that he would not have concluded with normal freedom of will. (Some authority also requires prejudice, but this is disputed.) Unconscionable exploitation of another's emergency is akin to undue influence: Both have been described as abuse of circumstances, and both render the contract voidable. In suitable cases, delictual damages may also be claimed.

Commercial bribery is now recognised as a further distinct ground for rescinding a contract.

== Requirements for contractual validity ==
=== Contractual capacity ===
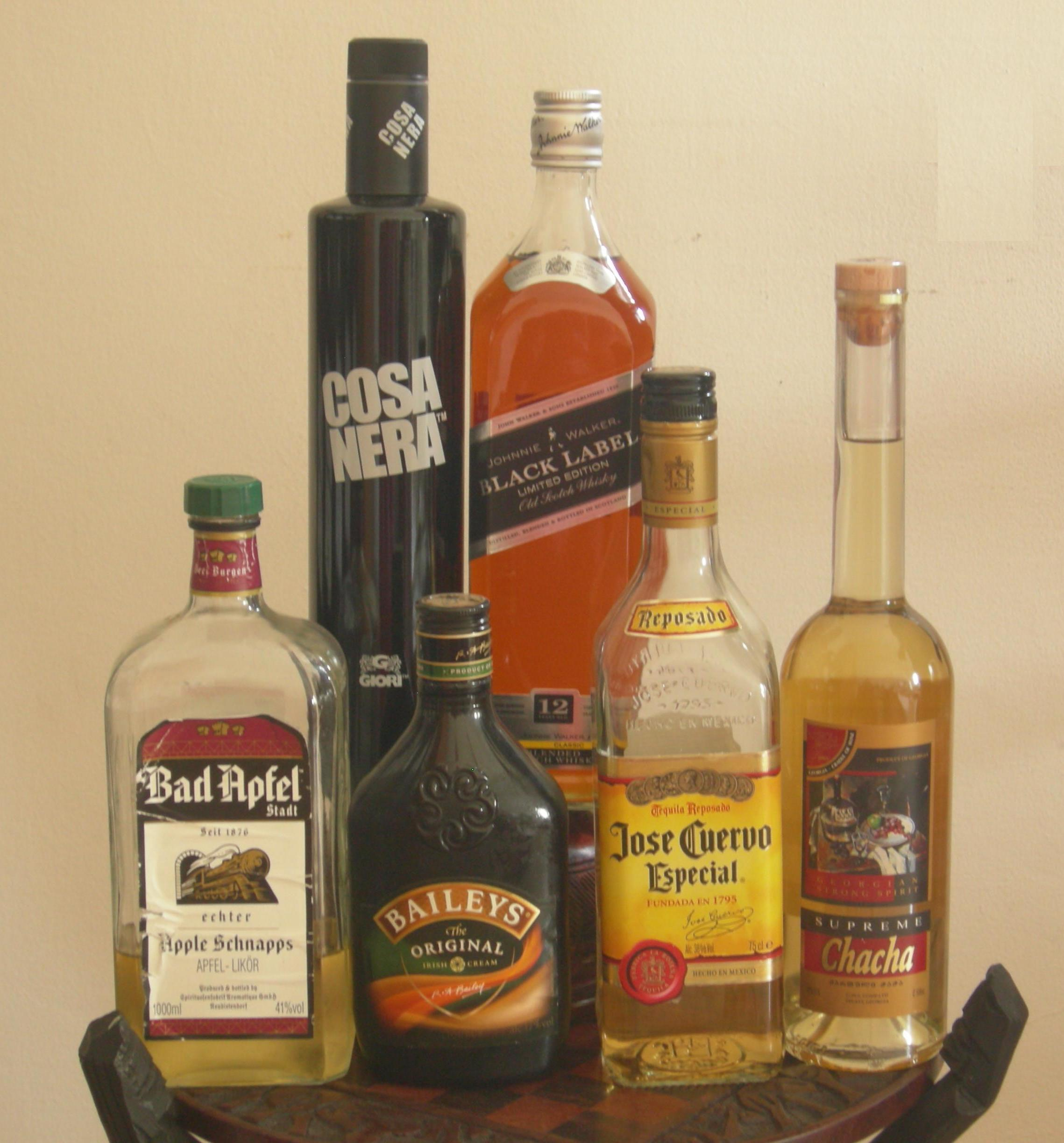
Intoxicated people lack contractual capacity.

All persons, whether natural or juristic, have passive legal capacity and can therefore bear rights and duties, but not all have contractual capacity, which enables persons to conclude the contracts by which those rights and duties are conferred. Natural persons can be divided into three groups:

1. All natural persons, as a general rule, have full contractual capacity.
2. Persons without any contractual capacity, such as infants, and some mental health care users and intoxicated persons, must be represented by their guardians or administrators.
3. Persons with limited contractual capacity include minors. They require the consent or assistance of their parents or guardians, or of another person such as the Master of the High Court or a court order for specific transactions. A court may grant restitution to a minor where a contract is detrimental to him. Persons married in community of property must obtain the consent of the other spouse for certain, specified transactions. Trustees must act on behalf of insolvent estates.

Juristic persons, including companies, close corporations, statutory entities and certain voluntary associations, are represented by authorised natural persons. The state may generally enter into contracts just like any other person, but its capacity to bind itself and its freedom to exercise its contractual powers may be limited by principles of public law.

=== Formalities ===
As a general rule, no formalities are required for a contract to be valid. (The exceptions to this occur when the law or the parties prescribe such formalities.) South African law does prescribe writing, notarial execution and registration as formalities for certain types of contract. Examples of contracts that depend for their validity on compliance with the formalities of writing and signature are:

- Alienations of land (Alienation of Land Act)
- Suretyships (General Law Amendment Act)
- Executory donations of anything but land (General Law Amendment Act)

Examples of contracts that are valid inter partes but cannot be enforced against third parties unless they comply with the formalities of notarial execution and/or registration:

- Antenuptial contracts, which require writing and notarial execution, in terms of the Deeds Registries Act;
- Long leases of land, which require writing, notarial execution, and registration against a title deed, in terms of the Formalities in respect of Leases of Land Act;
- Mortgages, which require writing, drawing up by a conveyancer as well as execution in presence of, attestation by, and registration by the Registrar of Deeds against a title deed;
- Prospecting contracts and mining leases, which require writing, notarial execution, and registration in the Mining Titles Registry or against the title deeds.

Electronic alternatives to writing and signature have been recognised for some contracts. The Electronic Communications and Transactions Act provides that information contained in a data message, and stored in a manner where it is accessible for future use, can substitute for writing. An electronic signature is likewise accepted as a signature. Alienations of land and certain long leases of land are specifically excluded. The Act applies to suretyships and executory donations of anything but land.

Some general features of writing as a prescribed formality can be identified:

- All material terms of the contract must be in writing.
- Terms implied by law (naturalia), as well as tacit terms, need not be in writing.
- The terms need not all be in one document.
- Any variation of a material term of the contract has to be in writing to be effective. An extension of time, a cancellation of contract and the revival of a cancelled contract do not amount to variations.
- The defence of estoppel may not be raised where a party has been misled to believe that there has been an oral variation of the contract.
- If formalities are not complied with, the contract is void. The return of a performance in a void contract may be claimed with an enrichment action. An alienation of land is valid from the beginning, if both parties have performed fully.

The legislature is motivated by diverse policy considerations when prescribing formalities:

- The purpose behind requiring writing and signature in contracts concerning the alienation of land and suretyship is legal certainty regarding the authenticity and content of these contracts. Certainty limits litigation and discourages malpractice.
- The purpose behind requiring writing and signatures for executory contracts of donation of anything but land is apparently to make sure that the donor has a serious intention to conclude the contract.
- The purpose behind requiring notarial execution for antenuptial contracts and registration for long leases of land seems to be notice to third parties.

There are diverse consequences for non-compliance with prescribed formalities:

- Alienations of land and suretyships (and any material variation of these contracts) are invalid.
- An oral donation is completed and valid when performed.
- Antenuptial contracts and long leases of land are valid between the parties, but are unenforceable against third parties.

The parties themselves may prescribe formalities regarding the conclusion, variation or cancellation of their contract, as well as the waiver of any right arising from their contract. Where the parties agree that their agreement must be in writing, they may have one of two possible intentions. (The first is presumed if no clear intention is evident.) Either their agreement is reduced to writing merely to facilitate proof of its terms, in which case the contract is binding immediately, or their agreement acquires legal effect only once it has been reduced to writing and signed by the parties.

A non-variation clause prescribes formalities (usually writing) for any variation of the contract. Such a clause is not against public policy; it is valid and enforceable if it entrenches both itself and the other contractual terms against oral variation. This is known as the Shifren principle. Such a clause is in favour of both parties and therefore does not offend the constitutional principle of equality.

A non-variation clause does sometimes have unacceptable consequences, and its application is limited. It is restrictively interpreted, because it limits the principle of freedom of contract. Cancellation of the contract and certain forms of waiver of rights (e.g. waiver of an accrued right arising from a breach of contract, datio in solutum, release of the debtor, and a pactum de non petendo) do not amount to variations. A non-variation clause is not enforced where its enforcement is against public policy or where estoppel can be raised. Neither defence has successfully been raised on the facts in any reported case.

A non-cancellation clause is valid and enforceable and restrictively interpreted, and applies only to consensual cancellations. To be effective, therefore, a non-cancellation clause must be coupled with a non-variation clause. A non-waiver clause is also valid and enforceable, but it is restrictively interpreted.

=== Legality ===
An underlying principle of the law of contract (pacta sunt servanda or sanctity of contract) is that agreements seriously concluded should be enforced, but agreements that are clearly detrimental to the interests of the community as a whole, whether they are contrary to law or morality (contra bonos mores), or if they run counter to social or economic expedience, is not enforced. These contracts are illegal on the grounds of public policy. The law regards illegal or unlawful contracts either as void and thus unenforceable, or as valid but unenforceable.

==== Void ====
Public policy has no fixed meaning, because it represents the public opinion of a particular community at a particular time. Considerations of public policy are to be found in legislation, the common law, good morals or the public interest. Most of the case law about performance contra bonos mores involves immoral or sexually reprehensible conduct. The legislator sometimes expressly or impliedly prohibits the conclusion of certain contracts. Since 1994, public policy in South Africa has been anchored primarily in the values enshrined in the Constitution.

The courts use their power to strike down a contract as contra bonos mores only sparingly and in the clearest of cases. It is required that the general tenor of the contract be contrary to public policy. When the relevant public interests are of a rival or even conflicting nature, the courts must balance the different interests against each other. Sanctity of contract often is given preference. The onus of proving illegality seems to rest on the party who relies on it, but a court will take notice of illegality in certain circumstances of its own accord. It is either the conclusion of a contract or its performance, or else the reason for its conclusion, that is regarded as objectionable and that renders the contract void.

Certain pacta de quota litis are against public policy and void. Unfair or unreasonable contracts can be against public policy and void if a more concrete indication of public interest is involved than mere injustice between the parties. The unfair enforcement of a contract by one of the parties can also be contrary to public policy and void, but the limits of this defence are uncertain.

An illegal contract that is void cannot be enforced—this is called the ex turpi rule—but the illegal part of an otherwise legal contract can be severed from the rest of the contract depending on the probable intention of the parties. If there has been performance on the void contract, in principle restitution should be granted, but the par delictum rule bars restitution where parties are equally morally guilty. This rule can be relaxed to see justice between the parties, depending on the facts of the case.

==== Valid but unenforceable ====
Certain wagers and some contracts in restraint of trade are examples of illegal contracts that are valid but unenforceable. The National Gambling Act has amended the common law with regard to gambling activities, including wagers:

- Debts arising from licensed gambling activities are valid and fully enforceable in law.
- Debts arising from unlicensed lawful gambling activities are valid and enforceable if the parties have an independent interest besides the outcome of the wager. If they do not have such an interest, the debts are valid but unenforceable.
- Debts arising from lawful informal bets are valid, but unenforceable.
- Debts arising from unlawful gambling activities are almost certainly void, as are debts from gambling activities of minors or persons excluded from participating in gambling.

Public policy requires the balancing of two conflicting public interests with regard to agreements in restraint of trade. On the one hand, contracts freely entered into should be performed (sanctity of contract); on the other, everyone should be free to carry on their profession or business (freedom of trade). A contract in restraint of trade is valid and enforceable unless the party wishing to escape its consequences can prove that the restraint is contrary to the public interest and thus unenforceable. The restraint denier consequently bears the onus of proving that enforcement of the restraint is contrary to policy. An agreement in restraint of trade that is contrary to public policy is not void, but is unenforceable.

A restraint-of-trade clause is contrary to public policy if the consequence of the restraint is unreasonable. In Basson v Chilwan, the court formulated a test for determining whether an agreement in restraint of trade is reasonable:

1. Is there an interest of the one party that is worthy of protection? Is there a protectable interest, in other words?
2. If so, is that interest threatened by the conduct of the other party?
3. If so, does that interest weigh up qualitatively and quantitatively against the interest of the other party to be economically active and productive?
4. Is there another aspect of public policy (having nothing to do with the relationship between the parties) that requires that the restraint should either be maintained or rejected?

The question of whether a restraint is in conflict with the public interest is to be assessed with regard to the prevailing circumstances at the time enforcement is sought. An agreement in restraint of trade can be partially enforced subject to certain limitations.

=== Possibility and certainty ===
Parties cannot create contractual obligations that are impossible to perform. The impossibility of performance must be objective or absolute: that is, for all practical intents and purposes, nobody should be able to render the performance. In the case of initial impossibility, the contractual obligation is void; in the case of supervening impossibility, performance becomes impossible after conclusion of the contract. The obligation then terminates. Where a party makes performance impossible, however, the obligation does not terminate: Such a party commits breach of contract.

In exceptional cases, a party may be liable despite the impossibility of performance. A party can be held liable for contractual damages if the impossibility was contemplated, or if the party warranted that performance was possible. Where performance is partially impossible, the entire contract may be void; alternatively, depending on the circumstances, there may be a proportional reduction in the counter-performance. A party can be held liable for delictual damages if he wrongfully creates the impression that performance is possible, and the other party suffers a loss. Transfers made in the purported fulfilment of contracts that are invalid due to impossibility can be reclaimed with remedies based on unjustified enrichment.

It is a general requirement for the creation of contractual obligations that their contents must be certain, or capable of being rendered certain. Courts generally try to interpret a contract as valid, rather than as void for uncertainty. In some circumstances, obligations may be void for uncertainty if they are pacta de contrahendo, or because they use vague language or are of indefinite duration. The parties may agree on a mechanism for determining what has to be performed. Where this mechanism takes the form of a power granted to a third party, or possibly even to one of the parties to determine what has to be performed, the courts will (depending on the type of contract) uphold the contract, provided that the power has been exercised reasonably.

An obligation that does not meet the certainty requirement is invalid. Depending on circumstances, though, it may be severable from the rest of the contract. A transfer made in purported fulfilment of an obligation that is invalid for uncertainty can be reclaimed with remedies based on unjustified enrichment.

== Parties to contracts ==
A contract confers rights and duties on the privies, but cannot impose them on outsiders (penitus extranei). Where more than two parties conclude a contract, their involvement in sharing its rights and duties must be determined. Simple joint liability or entitlement confers on each a pro rata share: either in equal or, by agreement, in specific shares. Where the parties have joint and several liability or entitlement, they may be held liable or be entitled to any share of performance, or even the entirety. Where performance is indivisible, be it by nature or by the intentions of the parties, a plurality of parties leads to a collective joint liability or entitlement.

Third parties may become involved in one way or another in the contractual relationship between others:

- A principal may authorise his agent to represent him in concluding a contract. Resulting rights and duties are conferred on the principal (not the agent) and on the other contracting party. The principal in such circumstances may be unidentified or even undisclosed. (This, indeed, is often the very rationale for using an agent in the first place.) The agent may only bind a non-existing principal, however, where statute allows this.
- It is possible to conclude a third-party contract (stipulatio alteri) for the benefit of a third-party beneficiary (alteri). The third-party beneficiary may claim the benefit only once he has accepted it, and under the ius quaesitum tertio principle may sue for performance.
- Contractual rights and obligations can be transferred from one of the contracting parties to a third party by:
  - Cession - transfer of rights
  - Delegation - transfer of obligations
  - Assignment - combined cession and delegation
- There are circumstances in which a person who is not a party to the contract may perform on behalf of a debtor, or in which a debtor may deliver performance to the third party.

== Obligations and terms ==
The subject matter of a contract is contained in the terms of an agreement. These terms define and qualify the obligations a contract creates.

=== Obligations ===
An obligation is a legal bond between two or more persons and comprises both a right and a duty:

- The debtor bears a duty to make the performance agreed upon.
- The creditor has a right to claim that performance.

All contracts give rise to personal rights and duties, so that a right that arises from a contractual obligation is enforceable only against the other party to that obligation.

==== Classifications ====
Obligations may be classified in various ways:-

===== Civil, natural and moral obligations =====
A moral obligation, such as the duty to fulfill a promise to join a friend at the nets on Friday for cricket practice, is not regarded as a legal obligation; it has no legal significance at all. The duty derives merely from a social agreement, or from the dictates of one's conscience.

A civil obligation, most common in contracts, is a legal obligation enforceable by a right of action, so that, if the obligation is not fulfilled, the creditor may sue the debtor for breach.

A natural obligation, relatively unusual, may not be enforced in a court of law, but it is not without legal significance:

- If a person performs in terms of a natural obligation, he may not later reclaim the performance on the basis that it was not owed. If performance is made, it is regarded as having been owed.
- Natural obligations may be set off against civil obligations.

Natural obligations arise when, for example, a minor concludes a contract: If the other party is major or a juristic person, he is bound by a civil obligation, but the minor is bound only by a natural obligation. Another example would be a betting agreement or wager.

===== Reciprocal obligations =====
Reciprocal obligations are linked obligations, where one obligation is owed in exchange for another:

In a contract of sale, therefore, payment of the purchase price and delivery of the object of the sale are owed in exchange for each other: the purchaser therefore does not have to pay unless the seller delivers.

Another example is a contract of lease, where the obligation to pay the rent is tied in with the obligation to let the premises. Where there are two obligations, 'there are two rights, two duties, and therefore two creditors and two debtors'.

===== Simple, alternative, generic or facilitative obligations =====
- A simple obligation involves a performance that has been specified exactly by the parties in their agreement. An alternative obligation is one in which the parties agree that someone can choose a performance from two or more specified alternatives. A generic obligation is one that allows a party to choose a performance from a specified family of performances. A facilitative obligation specifies the performance owed by the debtor, but gives the debtor the right to choose to make a different specified performance.
- An indivisible performance gives rise to a single obligation. A divisible performance gives rise to more than one obligation. There are as many obligations as there are indivisible performances owed in terms of a contract. A divisible contract is one that can be divided into separate contracts, each having one or more obligations.

Some categories overlap, as certain obligations fall simultaneously into several of them: "For example, an obligation relating to the delivery of a table lamp might be a civil, simple and reciprocal obligation, as well as entail an indivisible performance".

=== Terms ===
The parties to a contract frequently agree upon various modifications of their implied rights and obligations. These pacts or stipulations may be agreed upon orally, or they may be embodied in a written contract in the shape of provisions of clauses. Such provisions are often loosely referred to as 'conditions', but they are in fact not conditions at all; they are merely "terms of performance". The distinction between conditions and terms is of the utmost importance, since they differ in their legal effect.

- A condition is either fulfilled or not, according to whether a prescribed event does or does not take place. If the condition is fulfilled, it has an automatic effect, either creating or cancelling a contractual obligation. The fulfilment of a condition cannot be enforced, however.
- A term, on the other hand, imposes an obligation upon the party or parties concerned to make certain performance. If such party does not make the performance as prescribed by the term, he is in breach of contract, and the other party may invoke the appropriate remedies for breach. For example, suppose that Armand agrees to sell his motor car to Cameron for R100,000 subject to Ali's approval of the car, the price to be paid in monthly instalments of R10,000 each. The provision as to Ali's approval is a condition, while that relating to the method of payment is a term of performance.

Terms, then, are those stipulations in the contract that the parties have agreed on, and that bind them to perform. The terms of a contract set out the nature and details of the performance due by the parties under the contract: that is, the nature and description of the commodities or services to be rendered, and the manner, time and place of performance. Not all terms are necessarily in the written contract itself. Terms comprise both the stipulations that the parties include in their contract, and those provisions included by law. Contracts do not have to fall into any particular category, but certain traditional kinds are recognised, along with their own particular rules and terms and consequences.

The word term was formerly restricted to a provision relating to time: that is, a dies or time clause. The word, however, is now in general use as referring to any term of performance.

There is a distinction, then, between South African and English law, where terms and conditions are synonymous, and where they are used interchangeably. In South Africa, a condition is a very special type of contractual term, operating in a specific way; for example, "I will pay you R3,000 if you climb Table Mountain".

It remains the case in South Africa, however, that the word condition is very loosely used in the drafting of contracts. In the following formulation—'I agree to donate R50,000 on condition that...’—what we have is not a condition but a modus or modal clause.

==== Essentialia, naturalia and incidentalia ====
The primary rights and obligations flowing from a particular contract are those the parties expressly or tacitly agreed upon, and also those the law implies. This contrasts with secondary rights and obligations (such as the duty to pay damages and the duty to restore performances received prior to termination), which arise after a breach of contract. It is not necessary for the parties to agree upon any special rights or obligations other than those essential to their particular contracts (essentialia); all obligations concerning the manner, time or place of performance are regulated and are implied by law as soon as the parties have made their contract (naturalia). For example, if Sa Roj has agreed to sell her motor car to Bosie for R100,000, all the rights and obligations of both of them are regulated by the law. Sa Roj becomes subject to an obligation to deliver the car to Bosie at Bosie's request, and Bosie is obliged to pay Sa Roj the R100 000 the moment Bosie has accepted delivery of the car.

Similar principles apply to all other types of contract. The parties may, however, agree upon some modification or variation of their implied rights and obligations, provided they are not illegal (incidentalia). For example, in the case supposed, they may agree that the sale of the car is to take place only if the car is approved of by Rodney, or they may agree that the R100,000 is payable in monthly instalments of R10,000. These modifications of the contract, it will be seen directly, constitute either "conditions" or "terms of performance".

According to the Roman-Dutch classification, then, terms may be classified as essentialia, naturalia or incidentalia:

- Essentialia are distinctive terms used to identify or classify a contract as one of the specific types of contract recognised by law. Cash and commodities, for example, make for contracts of sale. Essentialia are of the essence in a contract, without which it cannot subsist, and for want of which there is either no contract or a contract of a different kind.
- Naturalia are terms automatically included, by operation of law (ex lege), in any contract belonging to one of the classes of specific contract traditionally recognised in South Africa. Naturalia are based on what is fair and reasonable between contracting parties over contracts of that kind. In a sale contract, for instance, the seller may not sell something that is defective. There are also guarantees against eviction in lease agreements. Generally speaking, the parties may exclude or vary naturalia by express agreement, in exclusion or exemption clauses (e.g. an ‘as is’ clause, known as a ‘voetstoots clause', excluding the implied warranty against latent defects), though the courts interpret such agreements narrowly.
- Incidentalia (or accidentalia) are all terms other than the essentialia and naturalia: that is, additional terms agreed upon expressly by the parties that supplement or modify the rights and duties incorporated by law into a particular contract.

Modern classification, as applied by the courts, generally favours the distinction between terms express and implied.

==== Express terms ====
Express terms are specifically and explicitly agreed upon by the parties, fixed by the actual agreement, and are either articulated in an oral contract or written down. They are the most important terms in the contract.

===== Signed contracts: caveat subscriptor =====
A person who signs a written contract is ordinarily bound by its terms in terms of the maxim caveat subscriptor: let the signatory beware.

===== Standard-form contracts =====
Express terms in standardised contracts are dealt with differently from express terms negotiated by the parties, in that a party presenting a standardised contract to another for signature is expected to draw his attention to any unexpected terms, failing which the signatory may not be bound.

===== Unsigned documents =====
Express terms may also be incorporated into a contract by reference to one or more other documents.

===== Ticket cases and notices =====
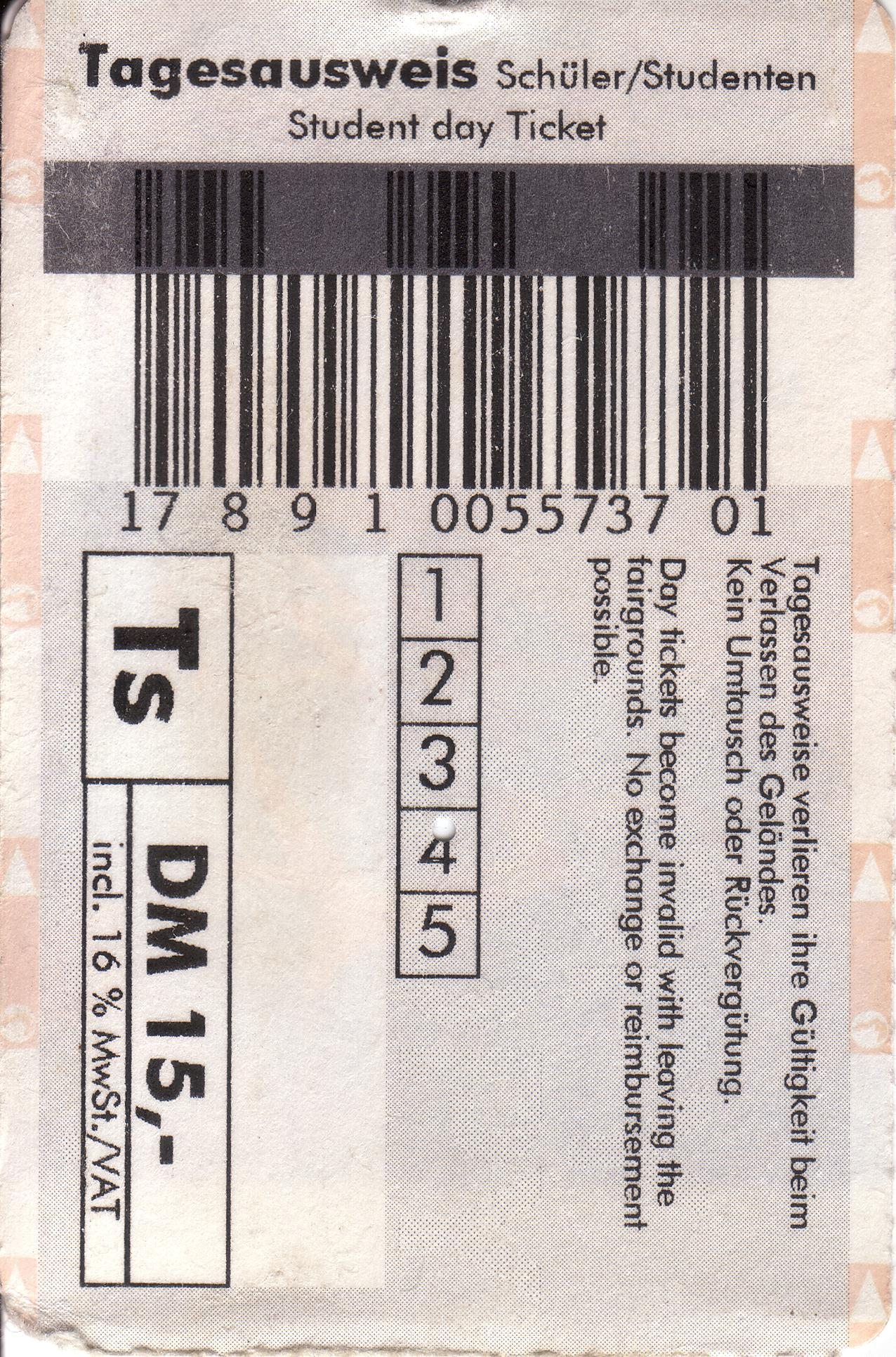
A ticket, with express legal terms.

Express terms contained on tickets and notices that are posted up in public places may also be binding, depending on whether the party denying that he is bound by the terms was aware of their existence or ought reasonably to have been aware of them in the circumstances.

===== Consumer Protection Act =====
The Consumer Protection Act provides that customers' attention must be drawn to certain categories of clauses or notices that could be prejudicial. In respect of serious or unexpected risks, customers must indicate their assent by signature or by other positive conduct.

===== Terms prohibited by law/implied terms =====
Certain terms are prohibited by law. Terms contrary to public policy, or in conflict with a statutory prohibition are not enforced. Sometimes courts are given the power to modify objectionable terms.

===== Tacit contracts =====
Tacit contracts are inferred from the conduct of the parties and are very controversial. Some writers hold that terms expressed by the parties' conduct may be regarded as tacit, whereas others hold that actual agreement is necessary. Tacit contracts also present problems as to their conceptual basis, the question being whether or not they should fall under the banner of express terms at all.

==== Implied terms ====
Implied terms are not explicitly agreed upon by the parties but nevertheless form part of the contract. They are binding on the parties without their having made any explicit agreement as to the points in question. They are effectively naturalia and usually entail legal duties, and in some cases may be varied or excluded by the parties, as in a contract of sale voetstoots. These terms derive from the common law, from trade usage or customs, and from statute. Most terms implied in law come from the common law, but there is not a closed list, because contract law is not static. A term may not be implied if it conflicts with the contract's express terms, or if these indicate that the parties did not wish to include that term.

As Corbett AJA noted in Alfred McAlpine v Transvaal Provincial Administration, 'In legal parlance the expression "implied term" is an ambiguous one in that it is often used, without discrimination, to denote two, possibly three, distinct concepts'. Terms may be implied, in other words:

1. By operation of law (ex lege)
2. By custom or trade usage
3. From the facts surrounding the agreement of the parties, or better say from the unarticulated intentions of the parties (ex consensu)

For present purposes, it suffices to focus on the first and the last of these—the second is usually merged into the first—and on the ambiguity between them.

===== Terms implied ex lege =====
A term implied in law (a naturale) is one that the law, in the absence of agreement to the contrary by the parties, and in some cases compulsorily, attaches to the particular class of contract. Many of the terms of performance or obligations of the parties in contracts such as sale, letting and hiring, or agency, are implied in law. For example, suppose that the owner of a grandstand lets a seat on it to a spectator for a certain day. The former is under an obligation to keep the stand in a proper state of repair, a term to that effect being implied in law in all contracts of letting and hiring of property.

Terms implied ex lege, or in law, may derive from the common law (as developed by the courts), from trade usage or custom, or from statute. (In the case of the common law, they have already been discussed in the section dealing with naturalia.) Terms implied ex lege may be varied or excluded expressly by the parties.

A custom is a particular rule that has existed, either actually or presumptively, from time immemorial in a particular locality, where it has obtained the force of law despite conflicting with or not being found in the general law of the land.

A term can be implied on the basis of trade usage, but such an implication is made not in law, strictly speaking, but on the basis of the parties' presumed intentions. Trade usages do not apply to a particular space; they develop in a particular profession or trade. In the case of Golden Cape Fruits v Fotoplate, Corbett JA established the requirements. The trade usage must be:

- Uniformly and universally observed
- Long established
- Reasonable, so that one would expect people in the trade to be aware of it
- Notorious
- Certain
- Not in conflict with positive law
- Not conflict with an express term of the contract

In Coutts v Jacobs, for instance, Jacobs consigned goods to Coutts, who sold them and charged commission, which Jacobs refused to pay. The judgment went against him, the court finding that there was a trade usage whereby wool sales agents were entitled to charge commission.

===== Tacit terms =====
A term implied in fact is generally referred to as a tacit term. A tacit term is a wordless understanding between contracting parties. These are terms the parties must have had in mind but did not expressly articulate because they are so obvious. A tacit term is implied where the contract is silent on the point, but where it is clear that the parties intended to include the term, and they would not have contracted other than on the basis of that term. A tacit term, accordingly, has the same legal effect as an express term. It is derived from the common intention of the parties, and is in this way an exception to the parol evidence rule.

The common intention of the parties in such a case is inferred by the court from the express terms of the contract and the surrounding circumstances, including the subsequent conduct of the parties. Suppose, in the example given above, that the spectator hired the seat for the purpose of seeing a certain ceremony that both parties contemplated would take place on that day, but that no express reference to the ceremony was made by the parties in contracting. A term is implied from the circumstances that the hiring is conditional on the ceremony taking place on the day in question.

The courts often deploy the officious-bystander test to determine whether or not a contract contains a tacit term, imagining that an impartial bystander had been present at the conclusion of the contract and had asked what might happen in a situation the parties had not expressly foreseen: If the answer is self-evident to the parties, the term is taken to be incorporated as a tacit term. If, therefore, the parties are engaged in a particular trade and know that there is a trade usage governing their transaction, they are taken to have tacitly incorporated it into their contract.

There being a presumption that parties in entering into an agreement have given expression to all the terms by which they intend to be bound, the courts are slow to find that an implied term affects their reciprocal obligations and will never do so if the effect of the implication would be to prejudice the rights of third parties. A term will not be implied merely because it is reasonable to do so; the courts will not make a contract for the parties. The implication must be necessary in the business sense to give efficacy to the contract. It is not necessary, however, that the parties should have consciously envisaged the situation. It is sufficient that their common intention was such that a reference to such a possible situation by a hypothetical 'officious bystander' would have evoked from them a prompt and unanimous assertion of the implied term. A term sought to be implied in a contract must be capable of clear and exact formulation. The party claiming the existence of a tacit term must formulate it clearly and precisely.

Whether or not a term is implied depends upon the facts of each particular case. One general question concerns the effect of a contract's being reduced to writing. An entire agreement clause in a contract has been said not to preclude the existence of a tacit term; it seems this also holds good when a statute requires the terms of the contract to be in writing. Another question related to the standard of proof that must be satisfied. The Appellate Division left this unanswered, after noting that there are two lines of authority when it comes to the proof of tacit contracts. Although none of them purports to resolve the issue, more judicial pronouncements follow the more stringent test that there must be no other reasonable interpretation than that the parties intended to, and did in fact, contract on the terms alleged than follow the less demanding 'most plausible probable conclusion' test.

==== Kerr's classification ====
In addition to essentialia, naturalia and incidentalia, on the one hand, and implied and express terms, on the other, Prof. AJ Kerr of Rhodes University offers another popular classification of contractual terms. He divides them more narrowly:

- Invariable terms are those that cannot be altered; no contract can exist without them. There are two types:
1. Essentials
2. Terms imposed by statute
- Express terms are those expressed by the parties.
- Implied terms are implied between the parties. They are imposed on the contract by implication.
- Residual terms (ex lege) are implied by law. They apply to a contract in the absence of invariable, express or implied terms, and exist outside of the agreement.

==== Material terms ====
To determine the nature of the relief one party can claim on a breach of a term by the other, the terms of a contract are sometimes distinguished as either 'material' or 'non-material'. Generally, in the absence of a clause that provides for cancellation (a lex commissoria), rescission of a contract is permissible only if the breach in question is regarded as a material breach, which is usually the case if it relates to a material (or essential or vital term)—that is, one that goes to the root of the contract. Material terms are those vital to the performance of obligations. The breach of a material term entitles the innocent party to cancel the contract. Breach of a non-material term gives rise to a claim for damages only.

A good deal of confusion has been caused in South African law by the expression warranty, which has a variety of technical meanings in English law. In South Africa, the word warranty is non-technical and simply means "term". Unfortunately, the use of the words condition and warranty in the English-law sense is relatively common in South Africa. This causes difficulties in the construction of documents.

The distinction between material and non-material terms applies to terms, whether they are created expressly or implied.

==== Conditions ====
A condition in South Africa is a term that qualifies a contractual obligation so as to make its operation and consequences dependent on the occurrence of some uncertain future event. The event must be not only future but also uncertain—something that may or may not take place. The fate of the obligation depends on whether the event takes place or not.

Conditions are usually classified in three ways, by:

1. The effect of the fulfilment of the condition on the obligation (whether, that is, it creates or discharges the obligation)
2. The nature of the event attached to the condition
3. with whom lies the power to fulfill the condition

The first of these is the most important. Its effect can be either suspensive or resolutive, or both.

===== Effect of fulfilment =====
This is the most common form of conditional classification.

If the parties agree that the performance of obligations under the contract is not enforceable until a certain condition is fulfilled, that condition is a suspensive one. As Van den Heever J noted, however, in Odendaalsrust Municipality v New Nigel Estate Gold Mining, "The contract (in the modern sense, now that all contracts are consensual) is binding immediately upon its conclusion; what may be suspended by a condition is the resultant obligation or its exigible content". In other words, the contract comes into being when the agreement is entered into, but the requirement of performance kicks in only if and when the condition is satisfied. In the example of a father who promises his daughter that he will buy a car for her if she passes her examinations, the contract forms when these terms are agreed to, but the father's obligation to buy the car sets in only if his daughter passes her examinations. Usually a suspensive condition must be fulfilled within a reasonable period of time, though sometimes the parties attach a period of time to the condition. A suspensive condition (or condition precedent), therefore, is one that suspends the operation of the obligation until the condition is fulfilled.

Pending the fulfilment of the suspensive condition, the parties are clearly in a contractual relationship from which neither may unilaterally resile. Although the operation of the contract is suspended, it gives rise not merely to a spes debiti but to contingent rights and duties that are recognised by law. For example, those rights may be protected by interdict, are capable of cession, and are transmissible on death. Until the condition is fulfilled, however, the obligation is neither enforceable nor capable of being performed. The better view is that the nature of the contract is unaffected by the condition. In the example given above, the contract is not innominate prior to fulfilment of the condition; it is simply a conditional sale.

Upon the fulfilment of the condition, however, the contract becomes absolute, and it has a retroactive effect. It dates back to the moment when the agreement was made, which is then regarded as having been unconditional from the outset. A suspensive condition must be fulfilled in its entirety, unless the parties intended that fulfilment of part of the condition should entail performance of part of the promise.

If the condition is not fulfilled, the obligation is treated as void ab initio, unless the condition is for the sole benefit of a party who waives the benefit of the condition within the time stipulated for fulfilment, by proper notification to the other party. Where no time is stipulated, the obligation is discharged if a condition, of a type that is not for the specific benefit of one party only, remains unfulfilled after the lapse of a reasonable time.

Another example of a suspensive condition is a sale of a thing subject to the thing's being approved of by a third person.

A suspensive condition should not be confused with a term or stipulation relating to time of performance. In the case of a suspensive condition, the operation of the obligation flowing from the contract is suspended, in whole or in part, pending the occurrence or non-occurrence of a particular specified event. A term of the contract, on the other hand, imposes a contractual obligation on a party to act, or to refrain from acting, in a particular manner. A contractual obligation flowing from a term of the contract can be enforced, but no action lies to compel the performance of a condition. It follows that a provision as to time of performance is simply a term of the contract: for example, where a company on a certain date declares a dividend 'payable to all shareholders registered' on a certain later date the right to the dividend vests in the shareholders on the date of the declaration, but the dividend is claimable only on the later date.

The nature of the contract may affect the rights of the parties when there is a suspensive condition. It has been held that, where an agreement of purchase and sale has been entered into subject to a suspensive condition, no contract of sale is then and there established; it develops into one of sale only on fulfilment of the condition.

This statement of the law, or what has been described as the Corondimas principle, has been much criticised, even though it has consistently been applied in subsequent cases. Although it was applied again, on the grounds of precedent, by the Appellate Division in Tuckers Land and Development v Strydom, its correctness was questioned and criticised, obiter by Van Heerden JA, and directly by Joubert JA. The latter, reviewing the old authorities, showed that the principle was not in accordance with Roman and Roman-Dutch law. "It would seem, however", wrote Tebbutt J in ABSA v Sweet, "that in a contract of lease no such considerations apply and a contractual relationship comes into existence between the lessor and the lessee on the signing of the lease although the resultant obligations arising from the lease may be suspended". It is apparently also now accepted, when a suspensive condition is fulfilled, that the contract and the parties' mutual rights 'relate back to, and are deemed to have been in force from, the date of the agreement and not from the date of the fulfilment of the condition, i.e. ex tunc’.

On the other hand, if the parties agree that the obligations under a contract should operate in full, but comes to an end if an uncertain future event either does or does not happen, they are said to have agreed to a resolutive condition (or condition subsequent). The continued existence of the contract depends on the event happening or not happening, as the case may be: for example, "I shall buy and give you a car on the condition that, if you fail your exams, I will take the car back." Another example would be a contract of sale whereby one sells a car on the condition that, if the buyer fails to pay the price by a certain date, it will be repossessed.

A resolutive condition, then, is one that discharges an existing obligation the moment the condition is fulfilled. Prior to the fulfilment of the condition attached to the contract, the contract has full legal effect, and either party may claim performance by the other of his obligations. Upon the fulfilment of the condition, the contract is terminated and is regarded as if it had never existed. The consequence is that each party may claim to be restored to his original position. For example, if Jess fails her exams, she must restore the car to Rodney.

===== Nature of the event =====
A positive condition depends on the occurrence of an uncertain future event: 'If Richman marries Anjanette', for example. A positive condition is fulfilled if and when the event contemplated by the parties takes place. It is fair to say that the preponderance of suspensive conditions is positive.

A negative condition depends on an uncertain future event's not happening. When it becomes clear that an event can no longer take place, the condition is satisfied and the agreement works on that basis. Negative conditions are generally resolutive.

===== Who has the power of fulfilment =====
Conditions may also be potestative, casual or mixed, depending on whether the operation of the obligation is dependent on the creditor's actions or on events beyond the control of the parties.

A causal condition depends for its fulfilment on some third party or outside agency or event, like chance, and not upon the action of either party: 'If Armand attains the age of twenty-five', for example, or 'If Armand has children'. The classic example is a contract of insurance, whereby the insurer makes a promise of reimbursement in the case of loss (as, for example, by flood or fire).

A potestative condition depends for its fulfilment on one of the contracting parties; it is entirely in the power of one of the parties. An example would be where Zola agreed to give her neighbour, Jaylynne, a sum of money if Jaylynne would cut down a tree that obstructed her view. If Jaylynne undertakes to cut down the tree in return for the money, the agreement is not conditional: Jaylynne is bound to perform her side of the bargain. A pure potestative condition si volam, which reserves to the promisor an unlimited choice as to whether to perform or not—"I shall give you R100 if I so wish"—clearly gives rise to no obligation whatsoever, but the position is otherwise if fulfilment depends on the will of the promisee (where, for example, Andrew gives Bianca an option to buy his farm). A potestative condition may be negative, as where Andrew makes a gift to Bianca on condition that Bianca refrains from doing something. A promise subject to a negative potestative condition is exigible only at the death of the promisee, for only then is the condition fulfilled.

A mixed condition is one composed of both elements: casual and potestative: for example, 'If Francois (one of the contracting parties) marries Cindi (some third person)’, or 'if the children continue to reside with their mother (the beneficiary)’. A mixed condition depends for its fulfilment on both or one of the parties to the contract, as well as a third party or chance event. It is a mixture of the potestative and the causal. As an example, quite common in wills, one may make an obligation under a contract subject to the condition that the other party marry someone.

The condition attached to the obligation must be possible.

===== Fictional fulfilment =====
Even if, in the case of a positive condition, the contemplated event does not take place, there may be what is called 'fictional fulfilment' of the condition. A contracting party must not obstruct the fulfilment of a condition. If the party who would be bound by the condition being fulfilled deliberately prevents its fulfilment to escape the obligation, the condition is deemed to have been fulfilled—with the consequence that the obligation becomes absolute. A legal fiction comes into effect. MacDuff v JCI is the leading case in this area.

Although negligent prevention of fulfilment does not trigger this principle, there may be a duty on a party to take active steps to bring about fulfilment of the condition, either because the contract stipulates such a duty or because omission of such steps would render fulfilment impossible. In such a case neglect to take the steps would bring about fictional fulfilment. For example, if Perry agrees to buy Robert's house, subject to his obtaining a loan from a bank or building society by a certain date, and Perry makes no effort to obtain the loan because of a sudden slump in the property market, the condition is considered fulfilled, and Perry is bound to the contract of sale. The operation of this principle is subject to the interests of third parties.

The above refers to suspensive conditions. It is generally thought that the principle of fictional fulfilment can be extended to the fictional non-fulfilment of a resolutive condition although there is no Roman-Dutch authority precisely in point.

==== Time clauses ====
A time clause (dies) is a contractual term that makes the existence of an obligation dependent on an event or time that is certain to arise in the future. Such clauses may be either suspensive or resolutive:

- An example of a suspensive time clause would be one that permits a car buyer to take the purchased vehicle now, but only commence payment in three weeks. In other words, the agreement suspends the date of payment until a certain date in the future.
- A resolutive time clause stipulates the duration of the contract, after which it ceases. Although it comes into existence and is performed right away, it will, at a certain future point, be resolved and the obligation terminated. Lease contracts and fixed period contracts of employment are common examples.

==== Other common contractual terms ====
Other significant contractual terms include suppositions, modal clauses, exemption clauses and non-variation clauses.

===== Assumptions and suppositions =====
The effect of a contract or obligation is often made contingent on the truth of an assumption the parties have made about a past or present fact. If Johann and Piet, for example, are negotiating a contract to buy and sell a painting, Johann may stipulate that he will make the purchase only if the painting is an original Rembrandt. They call in an expert. If their supposition is confirmed, the contract proceeds, if not, the contract falls away. Similarly, Fourie v CDMO Homes involved a sale of land, adjacent to a river, by CDMO to Fourie, whose offer had been subject to the following condition: that there were pump rights to the river. Although the parties were unsure that this was so, they concluded their agreement on the supposition that pump rights existed.

===== Modal clauses =====
A modus is a provision qualifying the creditor's right to performance in some way. Usually it involves the condition that the creditor use or refrain from using the performance in a particular way. Failure to comply with a modal clause constitutes a breach of contract.

Contracts of donation often have modal clauses attached to them. For example: "I will donate R100,000 bursary to Rhodes University for a Catholic male student." If, ignoring for present purposes the constitutional limits on freedom of testation, the university should instead make that bursury available to a Muslim female, it would be in breach.

Examples of modal clauses include property contracts, restrictive covenants and negative servitudes that have to be registered. They are commonly attached to the contract.

===== Warranties =====
A warranty is a written assurance that some product or service will be provided or will meet certain specifications. The relevant contracting party assumes absolute or strict liability for performance. In Schmidt v Dwyer, it was ruled that a warranty could not be overridden by a voetstoots clause.

There are, generally speaking, three kinds of warranty:

1. Express warranties, to which the parties expressly agree, and include in the written contract
2. Implied warranties, which are determined as per the officious-bystander test
3. Residual warranties, which apply to contracts because of the operation of the common law, as in the case of Van der Westhuizen v Arnold, with the warranty against eviction, or in the case of the rule against selling defective goods

===== Exemption clauses =====
Exemption or exclusionary clauses are the opposite of warranties, exempting persons from liability that would ordinarily apply to them under the law, or limiting their liability. To be effective in a given instance, such a provision must, of course, form part of the contract, and also encompass the liability and circumstances at issue. The law must also permit the alleged exemption or exclusion. Whether or not an exemption or limitation forms part of a contract turns on whether or not it has been agreed to, and usually depends on the operation of the doctrine of quasi-mutual assent, which protects someone who reasonably assumes that the other party assents thereto. The assent may be indicated:

- By a signature on a document (in which case the principle is traditionally expressed by the phrase caveat subscriptor)
- By conduct, which is the case where the clause appears, for example, on a ticket or on a notice at the entrance to premises

The facts of a particular case may fit into both classes. Hutchison and Du Bois submit "that this classification is merely a matter of convenience and of no actual importance". Whether the exemption or limitation forms part of any document or notice assented to depends on the interpretation of the pertinent document in accordance with the principles discussed above. In the absence of actual consent, the question is essentially whether, in light of the nature and appearance of the document in question, as well as the parties' conduct, it was reasonable for the party relying on the clause to assume that the other party assented to the clause, or was prepared to be bound by the terms of the document, whatever they were. This depends especially on the:

- Steps taken to bring the existence of the clause to the other's attention
- Sufficiency of the steps, depending on the nature of the document, the clause in question, as well as its presentation
- Particular circumstances of the parties

Of course, the effectiveness of such a clause may also be nullified by the usual principles relating to misrepresentation, fraud, duress, undue influence and mistake.

Exemption clauses are commonly deployed by big business for planning, for protection from liabilities and to control variables that are otherwise uncontrolled. Although an important feature of contracts, the fact that they are used on such a large scale means that they are approached by the courts with suspicion and:

1. Interpreted restrictively, particularly if they are unclear
2. Tested against the dictates of public policy. The Constitution, as illustrated in Barkhuizen v Napier, plays an important background role here.

====== Restrictive interpretation ======
If an exemption is clear and concise, there is very little room to manoeuvre. The courts are bound by the dolus rule. The difficulty here is that most exemption clauses are vague and ambiguous. The courts' attitude, well illustrated in Wells v SA Alumenite, is to interpret them very strictly.

If the clause is clear and unambiguous in its meaning, the courts give it that meaning. In Durban's Water Wonderland v Botha, where the respondent and her child sustained injuries when they were thrown off a malfunctioning jet ride at an amusement park, the court found that the exemption clause clearly covered any liability based on negligence related to the ride's design or manufacture. This approach has been confirmed by the Supreme Court of Appeal in more recent cases.

If the clause is ambiguous, the court interprets it narrowly and contra proferens. The contra proferentem principle provides the basis for determining the reach of such clauses. They are interpreted restrictively, confining them within reasonable bounds to the extent that this can be done without straining the clear meaning of a clause. This interpretation must be one to which the language is fairly susceptible; it must not be fanciful or remote. This means, for example, a provision may not be treated as an exemption clause at all, or a widely drawn clause may be interpreted as not referring to legal grounds of liability, or to cover only the minimum degree of blameworthiness for which the party would be liable, or not to deal with the circumstances of the claim, or not to protect against liability where this 'would make a mockery of the other provisions of the contract', in view of the obligations specifically assumed.

In this regard, the court must examine, among other things, the nature of the contract and its content, and the nature of the dealings between the parties. In Weinberg v Olivier, the owner of a garage was found to be liable for damage to a car parked there, in spite of an exemption clause in the basic bailment contract, because it did not to cover damage occurring outside the garage.

====== Public policy ======
It is now firmly settled that an exemption clause can protect against liability for a "fundamental breach" of contract. Exemption clauses often bring into issue questions of equity between big business and the common man: for example, as cited (unsuccessfully) by a patient in his claim against a hospital in Afrox Healthcare v Strydom. The fact that exemption clauses are generally held to be operative does not mean that a specific exclusionary clause cannot be declared contrary to public policy and as such unenforceable. The governing principle is that the courts will not enforce agreements judged to be contrary to public policy.

The standard applied in respect of exclusionary clauses is no different from that applicable to other contractual terms that are invalid as a result of considerations of public policy. The question is whether upholding the relevant clause or other term would conflict with the interests of the public as a result of extreme unfairness or other policy issues; in other words, whether a contractual provision, in view of its extreme unfairness or other policy considerations, conflicts with the interests of society. This has very rarely been shown to the courts' satisfaction.

A party cannot seek to exempt himself from liability for loss or damage to the property of another caused by his own dolus or by that of his servants. To permit of such a situation would be contra bonos mores. A party cannot exempt himself from liability for the wilful misconduct, or criminal or dishonest activity (fraud, in other words), of himself or his employees or agents. In Wells v SA Alumenite, the aggrieved party had been induced into buying a lighting company based on a misrepresentation, but there was a clause exempting seller from any misrepresentation. The Appellate Division held that, "if people sign such conditions they must, in the absence of fraud, be held to them. Public policy so demands."

Although it is clearly established a clause seeking to exclude liability for fraud is invalid, yet liability may be excluded for employees' dishonest conduct if their employer does not profit from it, and even for a party's own "wilful default". A party can be exempted from liability not only for negligence but, as per Afrox, also for gross negligence. In Government of the Republic of South Africa v Fibrespinners & Weavers the Appellate Division gave effect to a clause exempting an employer from liability for theft by its employee. More recently, FNB v Rosenblum confirmed this approach. Where one exempts oneself from negligence, however, one should do so explicitly. In cases of ambiguity, the clause is interpreted not to exclude liability for negligence.

Inequality of bargaining power is not in itself a ground for nullifying exemption clauses; nor does the principle of good faith operate as an independent criterion. The Constitution provides considerable potential for cutting down the range of permissible exemption clauses, however. A clause drafted in terms that exceed the bounds of what is permissible is confined to those bounds, rather than invalidated.

== Interpretation ==
Because many contractual disputes, perhaps the majority, arise out of disagreement concerning the meaning of contractual provisions, interpretation of contracts is an important area.

=== The law applicable to contracts ===
Sometimes a court is faced with a contract involving a foreign element: for example, where the contract has been made in one country, but is to be performed, wholly or partially, in some other country. The court then has to determine which legal system governs the contract. This determination is made by applying the appropriate conflict or choice-of-law rule. The law that is actually held to be applicable is known as "the proper law of the contract".

In the South African system, the rule is that the proper or governing law of the contract depends in the first instance on the express or implied intention of the parties. If the parties have expressly agreed (usually by means of a "choice-of-law" clause) that the law of a particular country shall govern their contract, their choice normally prevails. Where there is no such express agreement, circumstances may nevertheless be present from which a tacit choice of law may be inferred (for example, where the contract deals with concepts peculiar to a particular system), but such cases are in the nature of things relatively rare.

In the absence of any such choice by the parties, express or implied, the court simply assign a governing law to the contract. Traditionally this is done on the basis of a presumed intention fictitiously imputed to the parties, but the more modern approach is for the proper law to be determined objectively, with reference to the factual links between the agreement and the various relevant legal systems. In other words, the court selects the legal system "with which the transaction has its closest and most real connection". Usually this is the law of the country where the contract was made or signed (the lex loci contractus), or, when performance is to be tendered in another country, the law of that country (the lex loci solutionis). It has been argued that, in view of modern methods of communication and international trade, the weight of the locus celebrate contractus in assigning the governing law is diminishing. It is important to note, however, that the court is not restricted in its choice of proper law by any rigid rules, and may in appropriate cases assign to the contract some other governing law.

Normally, the contract is governed by a single proper law throughout its existence, since the rights and duties of the parties would be distorted if some were to be governed by one system of law and others by another. However, the manner of performance of the contractual obligations may differ according to the lex loci solutionis.

The proper law of the contract governs virtually all aspects of the contract, including its essential validity, nature, content, mode of performance and interpretation. By way of exception, however, the contractual capacity of the parties, together with the formalities of execution, are governed by the lex loci contractus, unless the contract concerns immovable property, in which case the law of the country where the property is situated (the lex situs or rei situae) applies. But it seems that a contract that does not comply with the formal requirements of the lex loci contractus is nonetheless formally valid if it complies as to form with the proper law of the contract.

=== The intention of the parties ===
"The primary purpose of the interpretation of a contract," writes Catherine Maxwell, "is to give effect to the intentions of the parties." The primary rule, therefore, is that effect must be given to the parties' common intention: that is, to what both of them intended on entering into the contract. As Innes J put it in Joubert v Enslin, "The golden rule applicable to the interpretation of all contracts is to ascertain and to follow the intention of the parties." If, therefore, the contract or admissible evidence gives a definite indication of the parties' meaning, the court should effect that meaning. This essentially subjective undertaking is generally understood to be the ideal in contractual interpretation.

Where a contract has been put into writing, the language used by the parties is frequently vague or ambiguous and if a dispute arises as to what the parties meant, it becomes necessary to ascertain what in fact they did intend. In ascertaining their intention various rules or canons of construction are employed. The chief of these rules are as follows.

=== Ordinary meaning ===
In practice, however, the approach is objective. The traditional approach is a conservative one that concentrates on the language of the agreement. The intentions of the parties must be gathered from the language of the contract and not from what either of them might have had in mind. Probably this approach is best articulated in Hansen, Schrader & Co. v De Gasperi:

Now, it is not for this Court to speculate as to what the intentions of the parties were when they entered into the contract. That must be gathered from their language, and it is the duty of the Court as far as possible to give to the language used by the parties its ordinary grammatical meaning.

In determining the common intention of the parties, then, the court must consider first the literal and ordinary meaning of the words in their contract. The court in Hansen was concerned not with the parties' intention so much as with whether their intention could clearly be apprehended in the actual document. Hence Innes J, in Joubert v Enslin: "If the contract itself, or any evidence admissible under the circumstances, affords a definite indication of the meaning of the contracting parties, then it seems to me that a court should always give effect to that meaning." If the wording speaks with sufficient clarity, in other words, it must be taken to express the parties' common intention. As Joubert JA put it in Coopers & Lybrand v Bryant, "the language in the document is to be given its grammatical and ordinary meaning unless it would result in some absurdity or some repugnancy or inconsistency with the rest of the instrument."

"Recourse to authoritative dictionaries is, of course, a permissible and often helpful method available to the Courts to ascertain the ordinary meaning of words," notes Hefer JA in Fundstrust v Van Deventer. "But judicial interpretation cannot be undertaken, as Schreiner JA observed in Jaga v Dönges [...] by 'excessive peering at the language to be interpreted without sufficient attention to the contextual scene'." In Joubert's words, "The mode of construction should never be to interpret the particular word or phrase in isolation (in vacuo) by itself."

=== Parol evidence rule ===
When a contract has been reduced to writing and litigation subsequently takes place concerning the contract or its terms, it happens not infrequently that one, if not both, of the parties desires to give oral evidence to show that the terms of the contract were other than those embodied in the document. A party relying on a written contract must prove its existence, and obviously oral evidence by or for him is admissible for that purpose. It follows that the other party to the case may in turn, by oral evidence, prove facts that show the written document did not constitute a contract at all—for example, that it was forged.

As regards the contents or terms of the written agreement, however, there is a very definite rule of law, known as the parol evidence rule, which places strict limits on the evidence that may be adduced in aid of interpretation. The rule dictates that, where the parties intended their agreement to be fully and finally embodied in writing, evidence to contradict or vary the terms of the writing, or to add to or subtract from them, is inadmissible. No evidence to prove the terms maybe given save the document itself (or, if it is lost, secondary evidence of its contents), nor may the contents of the document be contradicted, altered, added to or varied by parol or oral evidence, relating to what passed between the parties either before the written instrument was made or during its preparation. Where the parties have decided that a contract should be recorded in writing, their decision must be respected and the resulting document accepted as the sole evidence of the terms of the contract. The document itself, in other words, discloses the obligations.

From this it should be clear that the parol evidence rule applies only to written contracts. It does this by its very nature. The rule applies to all contracts in writing, whether or not the law requires that they be in writing to be valid. Further, the rule applies not only to express terms (terms actually in the written contract), but also to terms implied by law. For example, where land is sold, an obligation to pay the costs of transfer is, in the absence of express provision to the contrary, imposed by law on the seller. It follows that, if a written contract of sale of land makes no reference to the costs of transfer, the seller is not allowed to give evidence of an alleged prior agreement with the purchaser that the latter is to pay these costs.

The rule is generally binding only on the parties to the contract, not on third persons, for the latter may normally lead evidence to contradict or vary the contents of the contract. When, however, the issue in dispute (even between third parties) is what the obligations of the contracting parties to one another are, and those obligations are stated in a written contract, the integration rule is applicable.

It must be noted that the rule does not apply to oral agreements made after the written document was completed. Consequently, evidence may be given of a subsequent oral agreement altering or cancelling the written agreement, except where the contract is required by statute to be in writing, for such a contract cannot be varied by a later oral agreement, though it may be cancelled by such an agreement. Similarly, where the contract itself provides that it can be varied only in writing an oral variation is void, and so too, it seems, is an oral agreement to cancel the contract.

The rule excluding oral evidence derives not from the Roman-Dutch law, but from the English law of evidence, which has been adopted throughout South Africa by legislation.

Because it places strict limits on the evidence that may be adduced in aid of interpretation, the rule forms a background to all interpretation. It often operates to prevent the leading of valuable evidence, but, for all its difficulties, it serves the purpose of ensuring that, where the parties have decided that a contract should be recorded in writing, their decision will be honoured and the resulting document accepted as the sole evidence of its terms. Union Government v Vianini Ferro-Concrete Pipes is the leading case here:

Now this Court has accepted the rule that when a contract has been reduced to writing, the writing is, in general, regarded as the exclusive memorial of the transaction and in a suit between the parties no evidence to prove its terms may be given save the document of secondary evidence of its contents, nor may the contents of such document be contradicted, altered, added to or varied by parol evidence.

Evidence of earlier negotiations, for example, is usually inadmissible. This aspect of the rule, which is the background to all the other rules of interpretation, is known as the integration rule.

==== Integration rule ====
"It is clear to me," wrote Corbett JA in Johnston v Leal,

that the aim and effect of this rule is to prevent a party to a contract that has been integrated into a single and complete written memorial from seeking to contradict, add to or modify the writing by reference to extrinsic evidence and in that way to redefine the terms of the contract. The object of the party seeking to adduce such extrinsic evidence is usually to enforce the contract as redefined or, at any rate, to rely upon the contractual force of the additional or varied terms, as established by the extrinsic evidence.

The integretation aspect of the parol evidence rule therefore "defines the limits of the contract." The parties have "integrated" their negotiations into a single document, which should be regarded as the complete and final expression of their will: an "exclusive memorial" of their agreement. The purpose of this rule is to prevent a party from claiming other than what is provided for in the document. In Le Riche v Hamman, for example, Hamman sued to transfer one Victory Hill, which had been sold to Le Riche in error. Le Riche relied on oral evidence, but the parol evidence rule dictates that the court look first at the ordinary meaning of the contract. As this was clear and unambiguous, and did not, in its description of the land, refer to Victory Hill, Le Riche was unsuccessful.

Whether the document amounts to an integration of the agreement depends on whether the parties intended it to be the exclusive record thereof. The extrinsic evidence is excluded because it relates to matters that, by reason of the reduction of the contract to writing and its integration in a single memorial, have become legally immaterial or irrelevant.

The parol evidence rule is inapplicable when the question before the court is whether or not the parties actually intended to draw up an exclusive memorial in the first place, and when it is apparent that a written document was not so intended; indeed, the rule applies only to written contracts, and comes into play only once everyone is satisfied that a contract actually exists. Furthermore, the rule does not apply if the document in question represents only one part of the contract, or if the contract is partly written and partly oral, which is the same as saying that the document was not intended, as it must, to be the whole body of the contract. It must apply to the contract in its entirety. The rule is also inapplicable when:

- A written proposal, instead of being accepted simpliciter (which would bring the rule into operation), is orally modified before its acceptance
- A written contract is modified by a subsequent oral or written agreement between the parties, so that they no longer intend it to embody their whole contract

The integration rule is only a backstop, however; it comes into operation in the absence of some more dominant rule. It does not operate when an aggrieved party alleges fraud, misrepresentation, mistake, undue influence, duress or illegality, as in such cases the problem is with the foundation of the document, not with its interpretation. Although the integration rule does not exclude evidence of any subsequent oral agreement, a non-variation clause may be deployed to forestall such a thing. Nor does the rule prevent the leading of evidence to show that the written document was subject to a precedent condition not expressed in the document, provided the condition is a true condition which suspends the operation of the contract without varying any of its terms.

==== Where the rule excluding oral evidence does not apply ====
Since the rule excluding oral evidence applies only to evidence that varies terms or contents of the written document, it follows that oral evidence is admissible that does not vary or modify the terms: namely, evidence that relates to:

- The existence or validity of the written contract
- Explanation of its terms
- Collateral agreements not inconsistent with the written contract

===== Oral evidence relating to the existence or validity of the contract =====
Oral evidence may be given to the effect that the written document did not in fact constitute a contract at all: for example that:

- The document was not intended by the parties to be binding on them, but that it was a blind to deceive other persons, and that the real contract was a prior oral agreement.
- There was a prior oral agreement constituting a condition precedent to the contract's coming into effect, and that it had not been fulfilled.
- The contract was void on the ground of mistake, illegality impossibility or lack of consensus.
- It was voidable, for instance, on the ground of incapacity of one of the parties, or on the ground of misrepresentation.
- The contract was subject to rectification by the court on the ground that, owing to a mistake, a term or condition had either been incorrectly inserted or described in the written contract, or had been omitted from it.
- The contract had been entered into on the basis of a common, false supposition.

Evidence may also be given of a prior verbal discussion to determine whether a term imposing a particular obligation was implied.

===== Oral evidence to explain the terms of the contract =====
Extrinsic evidence is always admissible to show to what persons or things or matters the terms of a contract refer, when these facts cannot be determined from the document itself. In such a case the contract is not varied, but merely applied. Oral evidence may be given, therefore,

- to identify persons or things referred to in the written document;
- to explain technical expressions or phrases, or words used in a peculiar sense different from the ordinary meaning by reason either of special circumstances, or by virtue of trade usage (provided, it seems, that the usage is not inconsistent with the clear terms of the written document); or
- to elucidate ambiguous expressions (those capable of more than one meaning, either in themselves or as used with their context);

but not, apparently, where the language is clear and explicit, or where the meaning of the word is a matter of law.

===== Collateral agreements =====
Parol evidence is always admissible to show that the written contract is only part of the whole transaction, and that a separate oral agreement made at the same time was not incorporated in the written agreement—provided that the oral agreement referred to a matter on which the document is silent, and is not inconsistent with the terms of the written contract. It follows in these circumstances that two contracts may be proved, the one written and the other oral. Evidence, therefore, may be given of:

- An agreement for consideration additional to that mentioned in the written contract
- A collateral inducement by which one of the parties was persuaded to enter into the contract, even if the written agreement is one required by the law to be in writing

On the other hand, evidence of an oral agreement is not admissible if its terms are inconsistent with those of the written agreement—as, for example, where the acceptor of a bill of exchange alleges that the payee had orally agreed with him that he would be liable for the full amount of the bill. Similarly, where a deed of sale of land sets out the purchase price and also states that the land is sold without encumbrances, evidence is not admissible of a prior or contemporaneous oral agreement that the price was fixed at some other figure, or that the land was sold subject to a servitude.

Likewise, where there are not two collateral agreements but one composite contract, a portion of which is written and the remainder oral, evidence may be led to prove the supplemental oral portion, provided it is clear that the parties did not intend the written portion to be the exclusive memorial of the entire agreement. In such a case, termed a "partial integration", the integration rule merely prevents the admission of extrinsic evidence to contradict or vary the written portion of the agreement. The court may hear evidence of surrounding circumstances, including the negotiations of the parties, to determine whether they intended the written agreement to be an integration of their whole transaction or merely a partial integration.

==== Interpretation rule ====
The integration aspect of the parol evidence rule is supplemented by the interpretation rule, "which determines when and to what extent extrinsic evidence may be adduced to explain or affect the meaning of the words contained in a written contract." In other words, it controls the kind of evidence that may be led to establish the meaning of contractual provisions. Irrelevant evidence is inadmissible: It is a general rule that no evidence may be led to alter the clear and unambiguous meaning of a contract, whether written or oral.

When, therefore, the contract as written is lacking or incomplete, there is no problem with then referring to extrinsic evidence. This is not in conflict with the integration rule:

Where ex facie the document itself the contract appears to be incomplete, the object of leading extrinsic evidence is not to contradict, add to or modify the written document or to complete what is incomplete so that the contract may be enforced thus completed, but merely to explain the lack of completeness, to decide why the parties left blanks in a particular clause and what the integration actually comprises, and in this way to determine whether or not the document constitutes a valid and enforceable contract [...]. Consequently, it does not seem to me that the admission of such extrinsic evidence for this purpose [...] would be either contrary to the substance of the integration rule or likely to defeat its objects.

Although necessary, the rule can lead to injustice if too rigorously applied by excluding evidence of what the parties really agreed. The courts try to prevent the rule's use as an engine of fraud by a party who knows full well that the written contract does not represent the full agreement.

In the quest to exclude irrelevant evidence, the courts have historically drawn a distinction between background circumstances and surrounding circumstances, with the former being admissible and the latter usually not. Coopers & Lybrand v Bryant describes the "correct approach to the application of the 'golden rule' of interpretation after having ascertained the literal meaning of the word or phrase in question." This case should be read with Delmas Milling v Du Plessis, which cites the same three classes of evidence:

===== Textual context =====
The courts must have regard firstly (after determining the literal meaning) to "the context in which the word or phrase is used with its interrelation to the contract as a whole, including the nature and purpose of the contract." If there be difficulty, even "serious difficulty," it should "nevertheless be cleared up by linguistic treatment," if this is possible.

While grammatical meaning is the starting point of interpretation, words depend by necessity for their meaning on the contract as a whole. An understanding of the meaning of individual words must be gained from the wording of the contract as a whole: "It is, in my view, an unrewarding and misleading exercise to seize on one word in a document, determine its more usual or ordinary meaning, and then, having done so, to seek to interpret the document in the light of the meaning so ascribed to that word." The next step, accordingly, is to interpret the wording of a contract in the context of other provisions in the document read as a whole: that is, the textual context. This is done to give effect to the contract, rather than to make it ineffectual. The words are to be construed in their extended context: One may point to one of several "ordinary" meanings, or to an unusual or technical meaning.

===== Broader context =====
If, then, the language of the contract is clear and unambiguous, or if any uncertainty that may exist can be resolved satisfactorily by linguistic treatment, evidence of "surrounding circumstances"—that is to say, "matters that were probably present to the minds of the parties when they contracted"—is unnecessary and therefore inadmissible: cum in verba nulla ambiguitas est, non debet admitti voluntatis quaestio. If intra-textual treatment does not clearly yield the intention of the parties, the interpreter must look to the extended context to draw useful inferences from the nature of the contract, its purpose and the background against which it was concluded. In other words, only if a consideration of the language in its contextual setting fails to produce sufficient certainty (the degree of certainty required being left to the discretion of the individual judge) may evidence of "surrounding circumstances" be led. Even then, however, recourse may not be had to evidence of what passed between the parties in the course of negotiating the contract unless a consideration of the "surrounding circumstances" fails to resolve the difficulty.

If the problem cannot be sorted out with reference to the language, a court may be informed of the background circumstances under which the contract was concluded. These are matters of an uncontentious nature, such as the relationship in which the parties stood to one another at the time of contracting, which may help to explain the context of the contract. They convey "the genesis and purpose of the contract, i.e. [...] matters probably present to the minds of the parties when they contracted," but not the actual negotiations and similar statements. The sole purpose of such evidence, it is still said, is to enable the court to understand the broad context in which the words requiring interpretation were used. Although "it is commonly said that the Court is entitled to be informed of all such circumstances in all cases," this does not permit it to arrive at a different interpretation if the meaning is already clear from the words themselves.

===== Surrounding circumstances =====
Finally, but only "when the language of the document is on the face of it ambiguous," and its meaning therefore uncertain, the courts may consider surrounding circumstances: "what passed between the parties during the negotiations that preceded the conclusion of the agreement." These include "previous negotiations and correspondence between the parties, [and] subsequent conduct of the parties showing the sense in which they acted on the document, save direct evidence of their own intentions" (by which is meant actual negotiations between the parties).

Where even the use of surrounding circumstances does not provide "sufficient certainty"—where, that is, there is ambiguity in the narrow sense—and there is still no substantial balance in favour of one meaning over another; where, in other words, the case is one "of 'ambiguity' as opposed to mere 'uncertainty,'" then "recourse may be had to what passed between the parties on the subject of the contract." The court may also refer to evidence of the parties' negotiations: the way they acted in carrying the contract out. The court should use outside evidence as conservatively as possible, but use it if necessary to reach what seems to be sufficient certainty as to the meaning. The court is still not allowed, however, to hear evidence as to what the parties subjectively thought the disputed term meant.

==== Criticism ====
The golden rule of interpretation, together with the principles reflected in Delmas, has in recent years endured much criticism. The trend, in recognition of this, has been to erode the influence of the parol-evidence rule, admitting rather more kinds of evidence than fewer, although the practice of allowing all evidence has been also been criticised.

No court, yet, has gone so far as to overturn Delmas—judges usually confine their disapproval to obiter dicta—but it remains the case that the rules of interpretation in the South African law of contract are themselves hard to interpret, so that it falls to the particular views of each individual judge.

===== Too literal =====
The contention is made that so literalist an approach overlooks the fact that language may be imprecise, with no single meaning. The contention that words are always susceptible to one clear meaning is doubious. If this were the case, there would very rarely be the need to approach the court to interpret them.

===== Too hierarchical =====
The hierarchical nature of the exercise has also been criticised. While its rigid procedures may look good on paper, moving progressively, until a solution is found, through all the options available, in practice it is difficult to apply in court; indeed, the courts very rarely follow it, as it extends proceedings unnecessarily; instead the whole exercise is usually integrated, with counsel leading as much evidence as possible.

There is, therefore, a clear disconnect between theory and practice in this area of the law, although judicial support has been expressed for a more liberal approach to interpretation. The oft-quoted assertion that "the rule of interpretation is to ascertain, not what the parties' intention was, but what the language used in the contract means, i.e. what their intention was as expressed in the contract", has been treated very circumspectly. The principle tends to obscure the consensual basis of the South Africa law of contract, it is said, and is not inflexible, but subject to qualification. The words employed in a contract cannot be viewed in isolation, divorced from the matrix of facts in which they are set, if the intention of the parties is to be ascertained. While the first step in construing a contract is still to ascertain the ordinary, grammatical meaning of the words used, "it should be recognised that very few words have a single meaning, and even the 'ordinary' meaning of a word may vary according to, or be qualified by, the factual context in which it is used". A court should therefore be alive to the various possible meanings of the words, and should not approach the matter on the basis that a particular meaning predominates. It should also have regard to the nature and purpose of the contract, as well as the context of the words in the contract as a whole.

===== Terminologically confusing =====
Clearly the line between such "background circumstances" and other "surrounding circumstances" is a fine one. It has been contended, indeed, that the distinction between background and surrounding circumstances is imprecisely drawn. "Perhaps," as Lewis AJA put it in Van der Westhuizen v Arnold, "it is a distinction without a difference." It is clear that "background circumstances" are always admissible, whereas "surrounding circumstances" are admissible only when linguistic treatment is unsuccessful: that is, where ambiguity exists. It is unclear, however, what separates them in substance. Background circumstances are "matters probably present to the minds of the parties when they contracted," while surrounding circumstances have been defined as "what passed between the parties during the negotiations that preceded the conclusion of the agreement." It stands to reason, though, that "what passed between the parties during the negotiations that preceded the conclusion of the agreement" very often includes "matters probably present to the minds of the parties when they contracted." So difficult has it proven in practice to separate them that "no-one knows precisely what the dividing line between the two categories is." The whole procedure has been "bedvilled by the haziness," and the future utility of the distinction is questioned.

The question was raised as far back as 1979, in Cinema City v Morgenstern Family Estates, "whether the stage of development has been reached where the 'open sesame' of uncertainty may be dispensed with as a prerequisite to opening the door to evidence of surrounding circumstances, in either a limited or wider sense." This would have gone some way toward eliminating the background-surrounding differentiation. The court found, though, that it was "unnecessary to express any opinion" on the matter for the purposes of that case.

The question is now being asked, "pertinently", why evidence of "surrounding circumstances" should not be admissible in all cases, if the goal is to place the court as near as may be in the situation of the parties to the instrument. Such an approach would be "less artificial, more logical, consistent with modern thinking on the meaning of language, and would avoid the danger of a court enforcing a term in a contract to which neither party subscribed".

No court yet has gone so far as to rescind the Delmas paradigm. The courts continue to profess allegiance to the traditional approach. Nevertheless, an apparently more liberal attitude to the admission of evidence of contextual facts, however classified, as well as a growing emphasis on purposive interpretation, "herald a more flexible and sensible approach in practice". The strongest judicial attack on Delmas to date was launched by Harms DP in KPMG v Securefin:

The integration (or parol evidence) rule remains part of our law. However, it is frequently ignored by practitioners and seldom enforced by trial courts [...]. The time has arrived for us to accept that there is no merit in trying to distinguish between "background circumstances" and 'surrounding circumstances". The distinction is artificial and, in addition, both terms are vague and confusing. Consequently, everything tends to be admitted. The terms "context" or "factual matrix" ought to suffice.

This obiter dictum has been read as effectively heralding a new era in the interpretation of contracts in South Africa, suggesting that the Supreme Court of Appeal will abandon the distinction "as soon as it is presented with an opportunity to do so."

==== Circumventing the parol evidence rule ====
A litigant can circumvent the parol evidence rule by alleging a tacit term or by applying for rectification. Evidence relevant to such an allegation or application then becomes admissible, although it would have been inadmissible for the purposes of interpreting a written term of the contract.

=== Rectification ===
Rectification is a process that allows a party, under certain conditions, to amend the contents of the original document to reflect the original common intention. One may bring to this process extrinsic evidence, including negotiations, to convince the court to order the document's rectification.

In cases where the contract must be written in order to exist, the parol evidence rule applies. Although this would suggest that the document cannot be rectified by order of court, the case of Meyer v Merchants Trust, where such a document was rectified, shows that it can. The offending clause in that case read as follows:

I do hereby bind myself as surety [...] for the payment of all monies which may be owing by Gabbe & Meyer to their creditors [...] provided that the total amount recoverable from me notwithstanding the amount that may be owing by Gabbe & Meyer shall not exceed 250 pounds.

The typist had left out the word's homoeoteleuton. There was accordingly an attempt to claim rectification on the basis of the misrecording. The bank contended that this was not possible, because surety agreements, always and necessarily written, cannot be rectified. The Appellate Division disagreed.

=== Canons of construction ===
Where the meaning of a contract remains unclear despite application of the primary rules (whereby the court establishes the intention of the parties by considering the ordinary grammatical meaning of the words in their textual and extra-textual context), the courts use various further canons of construction.

==== Secondary rules of interpretation ====
Secondary rules include rules or presumptions:

- Against tautology or superfluity, such that, when examining a contract, its every word is seen to have relevance and purpose
- That, in the case of two similar written contracts, a deliberate change in expression or language in the second, where it is drafted with the first in mind, should be taken prima facie to import a change of intention
- That written or typed insertions in a printed agreement are interpreted as a more accurate reflection of the parties' intention than the printed terms, since these were deliberately selected by the parties themselves for the expression of their intention
- That inconvenience ought to be avoided, in favour of constructions that lead to less of it, and in accordance with the dictates of commercial efficiency
- That greater weight should be given to special provisions than to general ones (generalia specialibus non derogant);
- That, when words with a general meaning are used in association with words relating to a species of a particular class, the general word is restricted in meaning to the same class as the specific words (the eiusdem generis or noscitur a sociis rule)
- That, if a later provision qualifies an earlier provision, effect is to be given to the later qualifications;
- That, in the same vein, words are known or understood by the company they keep (noscitur a sociis), so that they should be read in their context, not in isolation
- That preambles are subordinate to the operative part of a contract if they are sufficiently clear
- That, where the language of the contract or a term is ambiguous—where, in other words, it is capable of more than one meaning—the court place the construction on it that upholds the contract, rather than one that makes it illegal and void (interpretatio chartarum benigne facienda est ut res magis valeat quam pereat);
- That, where the terms of a contract are ambiguous or vague, but the conduct of the parties shows that they have both given the same meaning to the words used, the court gives effect to that meaning;
- That the parties intended their contract to be legal rather than illegal;
- That, when a contract is ambiguous, the principle that all contracts are governed by good faith means that the intention of the parties is determined on the basis that they negotiated in good faith;
- That the parties intended their contract to have a fair result, although the unambiguous wording of a contract must not be departed from on equitable grounds, which has the paradoxical effect of ensuring that the courts do not in the interpretative process give one of the parties an unfair or unreasonable advantage over the other; and
- Against the implication of a term when an express term already covers the relevant ground (expressio unius est exclusio alterius, or expressum facit cessare taciturn). Where special mention is made of a particular thing or obligation, some other thing or obligation otherwise normally be implied in the circumstances is excluded. Express mention of one item indicates an intention to treat differently items of a similar nature that have not been mentioned. A lease agreement that forbids the tenant to fish in the dam may generally be taken to mean that he may fish in the river. On the other hand, a lease that tells him he may not cut down the gum trees on the property does not thereby entitle him to fell the oaks, the gum trees having been mentioned ex abundanti cautela.

==== Tertiary rules of interpretation ====
As a last resort, the courts may use tertiary rules of interpretation. The goal here, a divergence from prior procedure, is rather to set up a fair outcome than to give effect to the parties' common intention. These tertiary rules include

- the quod minimum rule, which states that ambiguous words must be narrowly interpreted, so as to encumber a debtor or promisor as little as possible;
- the contra stipulatorem rule, which states that a clause, in case of doubt, is interpreted against the person who stipulates for something (the creditor), and in favour of the promisor or debtor (in stipulationibus cum quaeritur quid actum sit, verba contra stipulatorem interpretanda sunt), the point being to limit the operation of the stipulation and to burden the debtor as little as possible; and
- the contra proferentem rule, which states that ambiguous terms of a contract are to be interpreted against the party who proposed them. The proferens is the party to the contract who is responsible, either himself or through an agent, for the wording of the ambiguous contract. The reasoning is simply that, if the wording is ambiguous, its author should be the one to suffer, as he had it in his power to make his meaning plain. The ambiguity is presumed to be due to his negligence in not having expressed himself more clearly when it was in his power to do so (verba fortius accipiuntur contra proferentem). Thus, where an insurance company frames a question that can have two reasonable meanings, the court adopts the one more favourable to the insured person.

The contra stipulatorem rule rests on the same basis as the contra proferentem rule, for the stipulator (promissee) was the person responsible for couching the stipulation in whatever language she chose. These rules 'reflect a normative commitment grounded in fairness and good faith rather than a search for the parties' intentions'.

Similarly, an interpretation putting an equitable construction on ambiguous words is favoured. A court will not adopt a meaning that gives one party an unfair advantage over the other. The courts also seek to safeguard common-law values and principles. Moreover, due regard must be had to any possible implication the Constitution might have.

==== When all rules are exhausted ====
If a court, having gone through all the rules of interpretation, is still unable to give meaning to the contract (in which case it must have been too poorly written to admit of any interpretation), it is declared void for vagueness.

=== Disclaimers, indemnities and exemption clauses ===
In the interpretation of disclaimers, indemnities and exemption clauses, the courts give effect to language that exempts the proferens from liability in express and unambiguous terms. If, however, there is ambiguity, the language is construed against the proferens—but a court must not adopt a strained or forced meaning in order to import some ambiguity.

=== Subjective versus objective ===
South African law seems to be moving from a relatively objective approach to interpretation, with a correspondingly restrictive attitude to admissibility of evidence, to one that is more subjective: that is, one whose aim is to discover what the parties subjectively intended.

== Breach of contract ==
A breach of contract occurs, generally, when a party to the contract, without lawful excuse, fails to honour his obligations under the contract.

=== Forms of breach ===
Although South Africa recognises a general concept of breach, specific recognised forms include:

- Ordinary breach;
- Mora, which comprises
  - Mora debitoris
  - Mora creditoris
- Repudiation
- Prevention of performance

Repudiation and prevention of performance are forms of anticipatory breach, since both can be committed prior to the stipulated time for performance.

Liability for breach of contract is distinct from liability in delict, and fault is not a general requirement for the recovery of damages for breach of contract. A contract may, of course, create an obligation to exercise care or to act without negligence, but the breach of such an obligation does not per se constitute a delict; it only amounts to a delict where the conduct independently constitutes a delict, irrespective of the contractual obligation.

==== Positive malperformance ====
Ordinary breach (or positive malperformance) relates to the content and quality of the performance made. In the formulation of AJ Kerr, "If without lawful excuse a party fails to do what he has contracted to do, or does what he has contracted not to do, an ordinary breach of contract is said to have occurred." This is breach in its starkest, most commonsensical form: essentially a failure to comply with the terms of a contract. All terms are susceptible to breach; in other words, both positive and negative obligations can be breached.

There are two requirements for ordinary breach in the case of a positive obligation:

1. There must have been some performance; the debtor must in fact have performed.
2. The performance must, however, be incomplete or defective. In Holmdene Brickworks v Roberts Construction, the respondent, a building and engineering company in need of bricks for certain walls of a building it was constructing, entered into a supply contract with the appellant. Shortly after construction was completed, Holmdene's bricks "were beginning to crumble and decompose," manifesting a condition known as "efflorescence," which threatened the stability of the entire edifice. The affected walls had to be demolished. Roberts sued successfully for consequential damages arising out of the breach.

Where the debtor has a negative obligation, positive malperformance occurs when the debtor does the act he is bound to refrain from doing. The usual remedies are available.

Where damages are awarded in lieu of the performance, or to complete it, they are known as "surrogate damages", as opposed to other consequential damages.

In the case of the positive malperformance of a negative obligation, the creditor is also entitled to apply for an interdict to restrain the debtor.

==== Mora ====
Mora is best defined as "delay without lawful excuse of the performance of a contractual duty or a wrongful failure to perform timeously." It relates, then, to the time of the performance, specifically to the failure to meet it, and is for this reason sometimes referred to as "negative malperformance".

===== Mora debitoris =====
Mora debitoris is the culpable failure of a debtor to make timeous performance of a positive obligation. There are five requirements:

1. The debt must be due and enforceable. The creditor must have a valid right to claim performance forthwith, against which the debtor can raise no valid defence, such as prescription, non-fulfilment of a suspensive condition, or the exceptio non adimpleti contractus.
2. The performance must have been fixed for a particular time, either in the contract or by way of a subsequent demand for performance. The mere fact that the debt is due does not mean that failure to perform constitutes mora, since timeous performance presupposes certainty as to the time for performance. The debtor can fall into mora only when a definite time for performance has been fixed, either in the contract itself (mora ex re) or by the creditor subsequently making a demand (interpellatio) on the debtor to perform by a specific date that is reasonable in the circumstances (mora ex persona).
3. The debt must (in spite of the failure as yet to perform) still capable of performance, since otherwise the breach consists in rendering performance impossible.
4. The delay must be the debtor's fault. It must be his responsibility, not out of his control. If, for example, performance was rendered temporarily impossible by vis major or casus fortuitus, or if the debtor could not reasonably have been expected to know that he had to perform, or how much to perform, there is no mora. (If, however, a debtor has guaranteed timeous performance, absence of fault does not prevent him from falling into mora.) The onus of proving the absence of fault rests on the debtor.
5. The debtor must have not yet have performed.

The consequences of mora debitoris are threefold. First, supervening impossibility of performance, which is not due to the fault of either party, does not terminate the contract, contrary to the normal rule, unless the debtor can show that, even if he had performed timeously, the same fate would have befallen the prestation in the hands of the creditor (perpetuatio obligationis). In the special case of the contract of sale, this rule has the effect that the risk of destruction passes back to the seller who is in mora.

Secondly, as in all cases of breach, the innocent party is entitled to contractual damages for any loss sustained as a result of the mora, irrespective of whether he can or does rescind the contract.

Thirdly, the creditor may cancel the contract if "time was of the essence of the contract, or was made so by a notice of rescission". Time is of the essence when the parties expressly or impliedly agreed that default of performance by the day fixed would entitle the other party to cancel the contract. An express clause to this effect is known as a lex commissoria. Even in the absence of such a clause, however, the circumstances often show that the parties regard the time for performance as being of the essence of the contract: for example, where they use precise language in fixing the time, or deliberately alter the date fixed in the original draft of the contract. Time is generally of the essence of a contract in mercantile transactions, particularly in respect of commodities that fluctuate in value, but not as a rule in transactions concerning land. In all cases, however, the decisive test is the intention of the parties.

Where time is not of the essence, the creditor may make it so by sending to the debtor a 'notice of rescission', informing him that, if he does not perform by the agreed date, or by a date fixed in the notice, the creditor may cancel the contract. The time stipulated for performance must be reasonable, taking into consideration all the circumstances of the case. The notice must be clear and unequivocal. Where the time for performance was not fixed in the contract itself, both a demand for performance (interpellatio) and a notice of rescission are necessary to allow cancellation for non-performance, though both may be, and usually are, contained in the same document.

The time element, for obvious reasons the most crucial element of mora, depends on whether it is mora ex re or mora ex persona.

====== Mora ex re ======
Where the parties have fixed in their contract a time for performance, either expressly or by necessary implication, a culpable failure by the debtor to perform on or before the due date automatically places him in mora ex re, without the need for any intervention on the part of the creditor. There are three contingencies:

1. The time is fixed expressly in the contract—for example, 'performance falls due within ten days'—in which case, as soon as it lapses, the debtor is in mora.
2. The time is fixed by necessary implication. If one purchased a ticket for the opening ceremony of the 2010 FIFA World Cup, the ticket would obviously have to be issued before the start of the ceremony. The standard is set out pithily by Colman J in Broderick Properties v Rood, where 'no time for performance was expressly stipulated in the contract but by necessary implication it can be shown that performance by some specific time was intended, and was essential'.
3. Finally, it may be implied that performance is to occur immediately, in which case the creditor need not make any demand for it. If a geyser bursts, and one contracts a plumber to repair it, the implication is that the plumber must set about his work immediately, not at some distant date in the future.

====== Mora ex persona ======
The standard for mora ex re is easier to meet than that for its counterpart. Where no time for the performance has been stipulated in the contract, or is necessarily implied by it, the creditor must himself place the debtor in mora ex persona. This he does by demanding performance on or before a definite date or time that is reasonable in the circumstances. There is no mora until this has been done. The onus is on the debtor to show that the time or date in question is unreasonable.

For example, a property developer contracts an agent to find him a designer for a golf course he wishes to build, but does not give a specific time for the completion of this task; it is an open agreement. Only when the developer has given a specific date for performance is the agent in mora (for failing to perform by that date).

In Willowdene Landowners v St Martin's Trust, the court addressed the question of how it is ascertained that the creditor's demand gave the debtor reasonable time to perform. Although it was noted that the reasonableness of the demand depends on the facts of each case, three broad questions must be considered:

1. What was the intention of the parties?
2. What was the nature of the performance due?
3. Did the debtor perform, as he should have, with due diligence?

Mora ex persona requires an interpellatio to fix the date of performance. An interpellatio is a demand added or appended to the contract after the fact. It is extrajudicial, and may be verbal or written, but it is usually made in a letter of demand, beginning with the words "I am now putting you to terms..."

The usual remedies, discussed more fully in the next section, apply for breach in the form of mora debitoris, namely:

- Specific performance
- Cancellation
- Damages
- Interest (as per the Prescribed Rate of Interest Act, currently set at 15.5 per cent per annum, or as agreed by the parties)

One consequence shared by other forms of breach is that, if performance becomes impossible after a debtor has fallen into mora, the debtor is not excused from performance (a consequence known as perpetuatio obligationis or, literally, "the perpetuation of the obligation").

If a debtor is in mora, the creditor may rescind the contract if time is of the essence—which it is if:

- There is an express or implied lex commissoria (forfeiture clause), to the effect that a failure to perform timeously entitles the creditor to cancel.
- The creditor has made time of the essence by sending the debtor a notice of rescission.

===== Mora creditoris =====
Where the co-operation of the creditor is necessary to enable the debtor to perform his contractual obligation, the creditor is obliged so to co-operate. Mora creditoris is the culpable failure of a creditor (the person to whom the performance is owed) to cooperate timeously with the debtor to enable him to perform. The creditor must not have repudiated the contract or rendered performance by the debtor impossible; otherwise the breach renders performance impossible.

Usually mora creditoris arises when the creditor is unavailable or inaccessible for the performance to be delivered, or if by some other means he delayed the performance. The requirements for mora creditoris are in many respects similar to those for mora debitoris. There are five conditions:

1. The debtor must be under an obligation to make the performance to the creditor, but the obligation need be neither enforceable nor due, since a debtor may discharge his debt before the due date for performance.
2. The debtor must take whatever steps towards performance that are possible without the creditor's co-operation before calling on the creditor to accept the performance. The performance offered by the debtor must be full, proper and perfect; otherwise the creditor is entitled to reject it and raise the exceptio non adimpleti contractus.
3. The cooperation of the creditor must have been necessary. There can be no question of mora creditoris, therefore, in respect of an obligation not to do something (obligatio non facere), since the cooperation of the creditor is not required in order that the debtor may refrain from acting.
4. The creditor must have failed to receive performance, or delayed in accepting it. Again, this presupposes a fixed time for performance. If no such time has been fixed in the contract, or if the debtor wishes to discharge his debt before the time fixed in the contract, he must notify the creditor of the time when he wishes to perform, allowing the creditor a reasonable opportunity to prepare to receive the performance.
5. The delay must have been the fault of the creditor. If it is occasioned by force majeure (vis major or casus fortuitus), for example, or if the creditor is entitled to reject the offered performance, there is no mora creditoris.

If, for example, a lease contract contains a term that requires the tenant to pay rent in cash on the last day of each month at the landlord's residence, and there is no-one home when he does so, the above requirements have been met. There is, therefore, mora creditoris.

The usual remedies for breach are available to the debtor. If the creditor is in mora, the risk of damage to contractual goods, caused by supervening impossibility and the debtor's negligence (short of gross negligence), passes to the creditor. Clearly, the debtor is entitled to damages for any loss he has suffered as a result of the mora, like the cost of storing merchandise or feeding animals he had to deliver. He may cancel the contract in the same circumstances as those in which the creditor may cancel for mora debitoris where time:

- Is of the essence (because of an express or implied lex commissoria)
- Has been made of the essence by the debtor's sending a notice of rescission that has been disregarded

If the debtor elects to abide by the contract, he may in suitable circumstances obtain an order compelling the creditor to co-operate. His own duty to perform then of course remains, but the delay on his side does not constitute mora debitoris, being occasioned by the fault of the creditor. The debtor's duty of care in respect of the article to be delivered (where appropriate) is diminished. Once the creditor falls into mora, the debtor is liable only for dolus or culpa lata. Moreover, the principle of perpetuatio obligationis applies here in reverse: The creditor bears the risk of supervening impossibility of performance brought about fortuitously or by the debtor's culpa (provided such negligence is not gross, culpa lata).

In the case of a reciprocal contract, the debtor may, despite his own incomplete or non-performance, claim counter-performance by the other party, who cannot raise the exceptio non adimpleti contractus, but the counter-performance is subject to reduction by the amount that the debtor saves by not fully performing on his side.

Mora creditoris releases sureties, but its effect on the existence of a mortgage, pledge or lien is uncertain. The effect on the debtor's duty to pay interest or other compensation for the use of a thing is also unclear.

Unless he cancels the contract, or obtains an order compelling the creditor to accept his performance, it is not clear how the debtor can discharge his debt without having to wait until the period of prescription has run, or until performance has become impossible. Consignation (payment into court with notice to the creditor) appears to have fallen into desuetude, and is in any event impossible or impracticable in many cases (as in the case where perishables are to be delivered). Whether the debtor may sell the goods for the account of the creditor is also uncertain.

The details, then, are the same, mutatis mutandis, as for mora debitoris, which is much more common. Mora creditoris is a very rare form of breach, its value inhering mostly in its conceptual reflection of its opposite.

==== Repudiation ====
Repudiation is a party's demonstration, by words or conduct, and without lawful excuse, of an unequivocal intention no longer to be bound by the contract or by any obligation forming part of it. A deliberate breach of a single provision in a contract to which that provision is essential amounts to repudiation of the entire contract. There are two kinds of repudiation:

1. Ordinary repudiation occurs when the obligation is already due, as in the case of a mala fide claim or a declaration that one cannot perform, or a denial that the contract is binding on the denier, or a denial of the existence of an obligation.
2. Anticipatory breach occurs when repudiation is made before the obligation comes due or in anticipation of an obligation to come.

The intention to repudiate is judged objectively; it is not a question of whether or not, in the subjective sense, someone thinks he has repudiated the contract. The court will ask how a reasonable person would assess the actions of the alleged repudiating party. The test to be applied is whether or not that party acted in such a way as to lead a reasonable person to the conclusion that he did not intend to fulfill his part of the contract. The breach must be major to constitute repudiation, and the denial must be serious. It must deny a material obligation that goes to the heart of the agreement.

As in all serious cases of breach, the innocent party has a choice of whether to rescind or to affirm the contract, and is relieved of his obligations in terms of the contract.

==== Prevention of performance ====
Where performance on either side becomes impossible due to the fault of one of the parties, the contract is not terminated, but the party who rendered performance impossible is guilty of prevention of performance. Objective impossibility is not necessary; the subjective variety suffices. Fault is not an essential element of this breach, unless the debtor has guaranteed the performance and the creditor is not at fault. The usual remedies, except for specific performance, are available to the creditor. In the case of material prevention of the performance of a divisible obligation, the creditor may only cancel pro tanto, and his counterperformance is reduced proportionately.

This form of breach is very rare, in part because it is so often categorised under one of the other forms. It offers very little by way of case law, as such cases are, for the most part, easily settled.

== Remedies for breach ==
Remedies for breach are aimed either at the fulfilment or at the rescission or cancellation of a contract. Full performance is the natural cause of termination of an agreement. Because breach interferes with proper fulfilment, the primary remedy is accordingly aimed at fulfilment. Cancellation is an extraordinary remedy.

Remedies may be claimed as soon as the breach occurs. This is especially helpful in cases of anticipatory breach, as the claimant does not have to wait for the date when performance falls due.

When breach occurs, the innocent party may generally either:

- Uphold the contract and insist on its fulfilment, by claiming either specific performance or its financial equivalent

or

- Rescind the contract, tender the return of the other party's performance and claim restitution of any performance already made by himself

Parties to an agreement may agree on remedies in the event of breach. Such agreement then takes precedence in the application of remedies for breach. Three types of remedy are available:

1. Remedies aimed at enforcement (which include specific performance and the exceptio non adimpleti contractus)
2. Cancellation
3. Remedies aimed at compensation (which include damages and interest)

Enforcement and cancellation are mutually exclusive remedies. Damages and interest are cumulative to other remedies. An innocent party may have alternative or additional claims in delict.

=== Remedies aimed at keeping the contract alive ===
==== Specific performance ====
A claim for specific performance is the primary and obvious and most basic remedy for breach of contract, upholding as it does the expectation interest of the creditor: When one enters into a contract, one expects performance in terms of it. The South African approach is in this way quite contrary to English law, where damages are preferred, and where specific performance is a special discretionary remedy that may be sought only in certain circumstances. A claim for specific performance may be for the payment of a sum of money (ad pecuniam solvendum), a claim for the performance of some positive act other than payment of money (ad factum praestandum) or a claim to enforce a negative obligation.

The remedy of specific performance is not absolute and does not guarantee success. Even where it is shown that there has been a breach, the remedy is not granted unless the innocent party is ready to perform and performance is subjectively and objectively possible for the defendant. The courts have exercised an equitable discretion to refuse a claim for specific performance, usually on the grounds of impossibility, undue hardship or in claims for the enforcement of personal services. An order for specific performance is enforced in keeping with the ordinary rules of procedure. The cases of Benson v SA Mutual Life, Santos v Igesund and Haynes v King William's Town Municipality set out guidelines to be taken into consideration where the court is asked to grant specific performance. A court does not make an order for specific performance in cases where:

- Performance is personal.
- There is a relative impossibility, where the specific person (an injured pop star, for example) cannot perform.
- Because it would have to supervise its decree, it would be difficult for the court to enforce it.
- The defendant is insolvent.
- Performance would severely prejudice third parties.
- It conflicts with public policy and would be inappropriate.
- As in Haynes, the cost to the defendant in being compelled to perform is out proportion to the corresponding benefit to the plaintiff, and the latter can equally well be compensated by an award of damages, an order is not made for specific performance. (The hardship of the contract at the time of its concluded, then, is not decisive of the matter; it may also be judged of at the time performance is claimed.)

The facts and circumstances of each case are determinative.

==== Exceptio non adimpleti contractus ====
The exceptio non adimpleti contractus is a defence raised against a contractual claim for specific performance. It may be used if the parties' obligations are reciprocal to one another, and if the other party is obliged to perform first (or simultaneously with the party raising the exceptio) but is in breach. The exceptio may also be used where that party has performed incompletely.

Synallagmatic contracts are subject to the principle of reciprocity. In terms of this principle, a party is not entitled to claim performance of a reciprocal obligation from another party where the former has to perform his obligation first or simultaneously, unless he has already performed or is tendering performance of his obligation. If, in a basic example, Warne sells a car to Cullinan, and Cullinan has not the money to pay for it, Warne may refuse to hand over the car. In contracts of mandate, similarly, to a real-estate agent claiming commission before the sale of a house, one may deploy the exceptio to refute her claim for specific performance.

Where the innocent party receives and starts using part-performance or defective performance, the contract cannot then be cancelled, as an election to keep the contract alive has been made, but the innocent party may raise the exceptio. Where the contract has been lawfully cancelled, the innocent party becomes liable to the breaching party for restitution of any performance received.

In BK Tooling v Scope Precision Engineering, the court confirmed the principle of reciprocity: An incomplete performance can not be equated with due performance. This, however, is a very strict application of the exceptio and would be too harsh on the debtor. The court accepted partial performance in that case, setting out two questions for consideration:

1. Has the creditor used the incomplete performance?
2. Do special equitable circumstances exist (that is, mitigating factors that garner the court's sympathy)?

In Thompson v Scholtz, the court could not apply the test in BK Tooling because the defective performance could not be repaired. To determine how to fix it, the court used the analogy of lease, with a remission of rental to award Thompson 75 per cent of his original claim.

The courts, then, have exercised their discretion to relax the principle of reciprocity where a breaching party has made defective or part-performance, which the innocent party has nonetheless begun to use; and where the innocent party (using the exceptio) is refusing to pay until full performance is made. In these circumstances, a court may order the party making use of the defective or incomplete performance to pay a reduced amount to the party in breach. The onus to prove the amount of the reduction is on the breaching party.

The exceptio non adimpleti contractus is available in all types of contract, but not where a breach is excused by law, or where the risk of defective performance lies with the party who wishes to raise the exceptio.

=== Cancellation ===
Cancellation, the consequence exclusively of a valid contract, cannot be claimed in all circumstances. It is an extraordinary remedy, available only if the breach is sufficiently serious or material—unless the parties have provided a cancellation clause (a lex commissoria) in the agreement, in which case the agreement takes precedence over common-law rules. If the breach is minor, and there is no lex commissoria, the innocent party can always rely on specific performance and claim for damages.

If, in the absence of a lex commissoria, the breach is a major one, the court considers, in terms of common law, the nature of the breach. In Swartz & Son v Wolmaransstad the court examined the severity of the breach to ascertain whether or not it was indeed a major one. There is thus a need to interpret how important is the relevant clause to the contract. The courts take the value-judgment approach to show that there has been a breach. The test is

whether the breach 'goes to the root of the contract', or affects a 'vital part' of the obligations or means that there is no 'substantial performance'. It amounts to saying that the breach must be so serious that it cannot reasonably be expected of the other party that he should continue with the contract and content himself with an eventual claim for damages.

In Strachan v Prinsloo, the court held that:

- To determine if the cancellation was justified, the test to apply was whether the plaintiff had failed to perform a vital term, express or implied, of the agreement.
- An important factor in deciding whether such term was vital was the question whether the defendant would have entered into the agreement in the absence of such term.
- The plaintiff had in fact failed to perform a vital term.
- The defendant was therefore justified in terminating the agreement.

A serious violation of duty by one partner, in other words, justifies the other in terminating the partnership. If an innocent party elects to cancel the contract, the other party must be notified of the decision. The election to cancel is a unilateral juristic act; it does not require a court order. If a court order is made, it merely confirms that the election was appropriate.

The notice of cancellation must be clear and unequivocal, and made within reasonable time. Once the decision is made, it is final. Although conduct may also be indicative of cancellation, the ideal is to communicate it expressly. If an innocent party expressly or tacitly manifests an intention to abide by the contract in spite the breach, the right to cancel on account of the breach is waived. Waiver and estoppel are two reasonable defences for cancellation. They may be based on past conduct or a previously spoken or -written waiver of the right to cancel.

Cancellation takes effect ex nunc (from that point onwards) when the other party is informed of it. Cancellation is in this way different from recission, which applies to voidable contracts ex tunc (from the beginning of the contract).

==== Consequences ====
The effect of cancelling a contract is that the primary and unexecuted obligations of the parties are extinguished. Accrued rights continue to be enforceable. Upon cancellation, each party is obliged reciprocally to restore whatever performance has been received—that is, to make restitution—to the other party. If, for example, a lessor cancelled because the lessee had three months' rent owing, the lessor may still claim the rent outstanding.

==== Mora ====
A contract may be cancelled in light of mora where:

- It contains a forfeiture clause
- Time is of the essence, in which case delay constitutes a major breach

Where time is not of the essence, a breach of time does not necessarily constitute a breach that allows the creditor to cancel. Once mora has occurred, the creditor is allowed to make time of the essence by serving notice of the right to rescind, after which he can cancel. This is not an interpellatio, which determines when mora, not cancellation, occurs.

=== Damages ===
Damages are a primary remedy for breach of contract: a claim to compensate for financial loss suffered as a result of the breach. Damages may be claimed in addition to other remedies. Their purpose, if they are positive-interest or expectation damages, is to place the innocent party in the position he would have occupied had the contract been properly performed (though the defaulting party is not liable for special consequences he could not have contemplated when he entered into the contract). Negative-interest or reliance damages aim to place the plaintiff in the position he would have occupied had he not entered into the contract at all. Contractual damages may include both expectation and reliance losses.

The requirements for a damages claim are:

1. A breach of contract by the defendant
2. Financial or patrimonial loss by the plaintiff, although it must be either damnum emergens (loss actually incurred because of the breach) or lucrum cessans (prospective damages or loss of profits that would, because of the breach, have been made in the future)
3. A factual causal link between the breach and the loss; and
4. Legal causation: The loss must not be too remote a consequence of the breach.

In terms of the difference rule, a plaintiff's financial loss is determined by comparing the patrimonial position occupied after the breach with the hypothetical patrimonial position that would have been occupied had the contract been properly performed. A distinction is made between positive interesse, which applies to contractual damages, and negative interesse, which applies to delictual ones. As the court put it in Trotman v Edwick,

The litigant who sues on delict sues to recover a loss sustained because of the wrongful conduct of another, in other words that the amount by which his patrimony has been diminished by such conduct should be restored to him.

The courts often use a more concrete approach to calculate damages in contractual cases, comparing the value that the specific asset or obligation would have had with its actual value after the breach (rather than on the patrimony as a whole). In terms of the market-value approach (where performance consists of marketable goods), the amount of damages is determined by the difference in the market value of the goods as received and the market value they would have had if the goods had conformed with the requirements of the contract. In terms of the once-and-for-all-rule, the plaintiff must claim all of his damages in one action. If not all of the loss has been suffered at the time the action is lodged, the plaintiff must include a claim for prospective losses in that action.

Factual causation is established by means of the "but-for" (or conditio sine qua non) test. The test for legal causation asks whether the causal connection between the breach and the loss is sufficiently close to justify the imposition of liability. General damages are generally and objectively foreseeable as flowing from the type of breach and are thus not too remote and are recoverable. Special damages would not normally be expected to flow from the type of breach in question and are thus presumed to be too remote unless exceptional circumstances are present. In terms of the convention principle, special damages can be claimed where the parties entered into the contract on the basis of their knowledge of the special circumstances, and thus can be taken to have agreed that there would be liability for damages arising from such circumstances.

An innocent party only needs to prove that a breach of contract was a cause of the loss, not that it was the dominant cause of the loss. There is no apportionment or reduction of damages where the plaintiff shares the fault for the loss. The mitigation rule, however, states that, where a breach of contract has occurred, the innocent party must take reasonable positive steps to prevent the occurrence of losses, or his claim may be reduced or eliminated.

To provide quick and easily provable relief in the event of breach of contract, contracts often include penalty clauses or other similar clauses (pre-estimates of damages and forfeiture clauses). Clauses falling within the scope of the Conventional Penalties Act are enforceable but subject to reduction on equitable grounds. A penalty clause excludes a claim for damages.

Interest that a creditor would have earned on an amount, had it been paid, is a loss that flows naturally from the breach and therefore constitutes damages that can be claimed. At common law, mora interest on a debt becomes payable from the date that a liquidated debt falls due. Where no date for payment is agreed, payment becomes due on demand from the creditor. In a claim for unliquidated damages, the debtor cannot be in mora until such time as the amount of damages has been fixed by a court. Interest is therefore only payable from the date of judgment.

The Prescribed Rate of Interest Act now governs claims for the payment of interest. In terms of the Act, interest at the prescribed rate is payable on any debt that bears interest, unless the rate of interest is set in the contract or by a trade custom. The Act also provides for interest to run on unliquidated debts from the time of demand or summons, whichever is earlier. The amount on which the interest is calculated is the amount as finally determined by court or in arbitration. The Act also provides for payment of mora interest on judgment debts where such debts would ordinarily not be interest-bearing. Although it is possible and permitted to arrive at an independent interest rate in the contract, this is subject to the test of reasonableness.

=== Other remedies ===
Other remedies available in the case of breach include the interdict and the declaration of rights.

==== Interdict ====
An interdict is a court order that prohibits the respondent from doing some specified thing. It may be used as a form of specific performance, to protect ancillary rights, to prevent a threatened breach of contract and to prevent third-party intervention. The requirements to be met for the granting of an interdict are

1. A clear right
2. Injury
3. No other effective ordinary remedy

==== Declaration of rights ====
Where there is uncertainty about rights under a contract, usually in the context of a dispute, a party may approach the court for a declaratory order that binds all interested parties, who should therefore be joined.

== Cession ==
Cession is a transfer of a personal incorporeal right or claim from the estate of the cedent (transferor) to that of the cessionary (transferee) by means of an agreement between the two; it is the substitution by contract, known as a cessionary agreement, of one creditor for another. It is the opposite, then, of delegation. For example,

Assume A has a right to claim money from B, arising from a contract or any other source of obligation. A might sell that right to C. The sale of the right is a contract, or obligationary agreement that obliges A to transfer the right to C.The sale itself does not transfer the right; that is achieved by cession, which in theory is a separate agreement entailing concurring intentions: to transfer the right on A's part and to take transfer of it on C's part.

As a general rule, all claims can be ceded: contractual rights as well as delictual ones. Future rights, too, may be ceded, as was shown in FNB v Lynn. Logically speaking, the court noted there, a non-existent right of action or a non-existent debt cannot be transferred as the subject-matter of a cession. The parties may agree in the obligationary agreement to cede to the cessionary a future or contingent right of action (spes futurae actionis), or a future or conditional debt (debitum futurum or conditionale) as and when it comes into existence and accrues or becomes due and payable, whereupon it is transferred to the cessionary. If it never comes into existence it amounts to a non-existent right of action or a non-existent debt, which cannot qualify as the subject-matter of a cession.

=== Requirements ===
The following are requirements for a valid cession:

- The cedent must have a primary claim against the debtor.
- The cedent must be entitled to dispose of that personal right.
- The personal right must be capable of cession. All claims are prima facie cessionable except:
  - Claims subject to a pactum de non cedendo (an anti-cession clause);
  - Where prohibited by law, as in the case of patent rights, workers' compensation, pensioners' rights, and earnings of insolvents; and
  - Claims of an extremely personal nature, as per the delectus personae rule, for which the test is set out in Sasfin v Beukes: Would the debtor be indebted in a substantially different way as a result of the cession? If so, it cannot be accepted. Examples of claims too personal to be ceded include claims for spousal maintenance, claims for pain and suffering under the actio iniuriarium, employment agreements, and partnership agreements.
- A cession agreement must be concluded between the cedent and the cessionary, giving the latter causa for the ceded claim.
- Both parties must have contractual capacity.
- The formalities set by law or by the parties must be complied with.
- The cession must not be prohibited by law, against public policy, or contra bonos mores.
- The cession should not prejudice the debtor. Cession may not split a claim against the debtor, so that he faces multiple actions; the claim must be ceded in toto. The only time a claim may be split is when it is with the debtor's consent.

Although it is not necessary to give notice to the debtor of the fact of the cession, it is generally seen as advisable. If the debtor is unaware that his obligation is to a new creditor (i.e. the cessionary), he may still discharge his obligation to the cedent, in which case the cessionary loses his claim (although he may have an action for unjustified enrichment against the cedent). It is therefore usually in the cessionary's interest to serve the debtor with notice.

A valid causa is not necessary for a valid cession, but it is a requirement for the cession to have a permanent effect.

=== Consequences ===
Cession transfers a claim from the estate of the cedent to that of the cessionary. This has a number of consequences:

1. The personal right now falls into the estate of the cessionary, whether he be liquid or insolvent.
2. The cessionary is the only person entitled to enforce, novate, delegate or set off the debt. The cedent may no longer claim from the debtor.
3. The rule nemo plus iuris ad alium transferre potest quam ipse haberet applies to cession. The cedent cannot cede the same claim more than once; nor can he transfer to the cessionary any greater right than the cedent has himself. The whole claim is transferred to the estate of the cessionary, together with all its benefits, privileges, and disadvantages.
4. As a general rule, once the cession has taken place, the debtor can validly perform only towards the cessionary, because the cedent is no longer the creditor. The debtor is, however, released if he performs towards the original creditor (the cedent) in good faith and without knowledge of the cession. As observed above, it is generally thought prudent of the cessionary to serve notice of the cession on the debtor.
5. The debtor may raise against the cessionary any defence available to him that he would have had against the cedent. This is because the causa of this original obligation does not change.

=== Security cession ===
Cession in securitatem debiti is different from outright cession. It is designed to secure a debt, often a loan or overdraft facilities. The cedent does not fall out of the picture completely but retains what is known as a reversionary interest. In other words, once the loan is paid off, the rights revert to the cedent.

The fiduciary security cession and the pledge are the two known forms of security cession. A security cession is interpreted as a pledge unless the parties make it clear that they wish their security cession to be in the form of the fiduciary cession.

The fiduciary security cession is an ordinary cession of a personal right as security coupled with a fiduciary agreement, which is an ordinary contract. In a pledge of a personal right, the ownership of the personal right is retained by the cedent, while only quasi-possession is transferred to the cessionary (pledgee).

== Termination of obligations ==
Obligations may be terminated upon full and proper performance, by agreement or by operation of law.

=== Termination by performance ===
Most contracts are not breached. The primary means of termination is by due and full and proper performance, which is usually rendered by the person on whom the duty to perform is imposed. The effect of proper performance or payment is to release the party concerned from his contractual obligation. Payment is the delivery of what is owed by a person competent to deliver to a person competent to receive. When made, it operates to discharge the obligation of the debtor. Proper performance of a party's obligation discharges not only that obligation but also any obligations accessory to it, such as contracts of suretyship and pledge.

==== By whom ====
The contract determines by whom performance should be made. Usually it is the person upon whom the obligation is imposed. In cases of delectus personae, there is no alternative performer; it is mandatory that that specific debtor perform. In the absence of delectus personae, performance could also be rendered by third parties, including:

- An agent, appointed by the debtor to perform on his behalf
- A surety (as per the previous section)
- Another third party, either charitably or by agreement (which is to say, in the latter case, by delegation). This may be done even without the debtor's knowledge.

It is important to note, however, that the third party is a stranger to the contract and is therefore not bound to perform; if he does not, it is the party who promised he would who is liable.

The creditor is entitled to reject performance by a third party if it is not in the name of the debtor. A third party who performs in the name of the debtor is entitled to payment by the creditor of any security deposited or pledged by the debtor with the creditor, unless the third party pays as the debtor's agent. The creditor is not entitled to proceed against the third party, however, as there is no privity of contract between them.

==== To whom ====
As for the question of to whom performance must be made, there is a variety of possibilities. Depending on the circumstances, performance may be rendered to:

- The creditor
- The creditor's agent
- Some third party indicated by the creditor, thereby producing a subsidiary contract (adiectus solutionis causa);
- A third party, the adiectus solutionis causa, agreed on by the original parties. This party is entitled to receive performance.

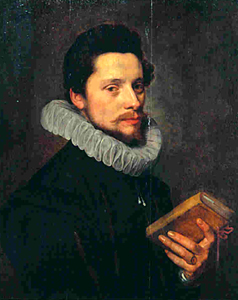
Hugo Grotius.

==== Time and place ====
The time and place of performance are usually stipulated in the contract. The first port of call, therefore, is to examine the contract and determine whether or not it stipulates a particular place for performance. If there is no specific stipulation, the type of contract generally determines the place for the requisite performance. In the law of sale, for instance, it is the buyer's obligation to fetch the item from the seller. Some obligations can only be fulfilled in a certain place, like the transfer of property, which occurs only at the Deeds Registry.

If no date is stipulated, performance must occur "within a reasonable time," to be determined, again, by the nature of the contract. Concrete Products v Natal Leather Industries is the leading and most illustrative case on the determination of reasonable time. In that case, the plaintiff agreed to sell the defendant a large number of steel corners for suitcases in different sizes. The agreement provided that several thousand of each size were to be delivered every week, and that the order for small corners was to be regarded as urgent. No time for the commencement of delivery was fixed. The plaintiff failed to deliver the small corners despite the defendant's insistence that the contract be carried out. He did, however, dispatch medium corners, which were accepted by the defendant in terms of the contract. As a result of the non-delivery of the small corners, the defendant, about three weeks after the date of the contract, notified the plaintiff of its cancellation.

==== Nature ====
===== Performance =====
As for what constitutes performance, the case of BK Tooling v Scope Precision Engineering, with its review of the principle of reciprocity and the exceptio non adimpleti contractus, sets out several clear requirements:

In reciprocal contracts, a creditor has the right to receive full and complete performance. There must be strict compliance, in other words: 100 per cent performance. The principle of reciprocity recognises that in many contracts the common intention of the parties, expressed or unexpressed, is that there should be an exchange of performances. The creditor, therefore, may refuse any vaguely inappropriate performance. Part performance is not performance.

The strict legal position is that, if a builder, say, should complete only half the contracted construction, and then sue for payment, the other party is entitled to deploy the exceptio. Because part performance is not performance, no payment is owed. Importantly, though, the defendant only succeeds with the exceptio if the plaintiff's performance fell due prior to or simultaneously with the performance claimed from the defendant.

The courts reserve for themselves a discretion to depart from the strict legal position, and sometimes award reduced counterperformance to the plaintiff, in which case it is up to the debtor to prove what the reduced fee should be. (The usual test to subtract the cost of rectifying the problem or defect or shortcoming from the full fee.) Strict exceptio is only imposed if two requirements are met:

1. The creditor must not have used the incomplete performance. Mere accession to land, in the case of buildings, does not amount to utilisation. One has to move into a building for it to be considered utilised.
2. There must be no special equitable circumstances that exist. This is where the court exercises its discretion.

Performance may not be made in instalments unless such have explicitly been permitted or agreed upon by the parties; otherwise it must be made whole. Authority for this position goes as far back as Grotius, with his stipulation that performance be made in a lump.

The defaulting debtor may not elect to pay damages in lieu of performance, unless it is at the prerogative of the creditor. The law does not require that the creditor accept an offer to this effect; he is entitled to continue to demand performance.

No substitution is permitted: that is, no giving the creditor something else in lieu of performance. This is once more subject to the qualification that the parties may agree to the alternative, which is known formally as datio in solutum.

In summary, then, the requirements for performance are as follows:

- There must be strict compliance.
- Unless specifically agreed upon, performance may not be tendered in instalments.
- There is no election to pay damages in lieu of performance—unless this is agreed upon.
- Performance must be in forma specifica.
- There may be no substitution of performance unless the creditor accepts.

===== Payment =====
The basic requirements for performance in the form of monetary payment are to be found in the South African Reserve Bank Act, the most important of which is that it must be in the form of legal tender. This includes notes, coins and even krugerrands.

The Act also establishes limits on the volume of change or coinage that one may use. Provided that it is a reasonable amount, one may make payment in coins, but one may not meet huge sums, such as school fees, with coinage. The creditor is entitled not to accept that as viable tender.

With respect to inflation, the principle of nominalism applies: The courts do not make inflation adjustments. If, therefore, one owed R100 in 1990, it remains R100 today. The debtor should pay the amount specified in contract, though some contracts specifically factor in inflation, in which case it applies.

Similarly, the no-difference principle applies to foreign exchange: There are no currency conversions, so that what is claimed in one currency is owed in that currency.

Payment by cheque is allowed, but only once the bank has honoured it; if the cheque bounces, it is regarded as non-payment.

=== Termination by agreement ===
Termination or alteration of an obligation by agreement may take several forms.

==== Variation ====
The parties may agree to vary a term of their contract, in which case the contract is not terminated but is simply altered in some way.

==== Release and waiver ====
A release is an agreement between the parties that the debtor be freed or "released" from an obligation. (The term "waiver" is sometimes used synonymously, but "release," for reasons soon to become apparent, is more accurate here.) Releases are most often to be found in employment contracts.

A waiver occurs when the creditor elects, without discussion or arrangement (and therefore, unlike release, usually without agreement), to "waive" certain claims or rights under a contract; it is, in other words, the unilateral act of abandoning a right that exists for the creditor's sole benefit. By way of example, the non-breaching party has the right, in cases of major breach, to claim cancellation, but that right may be waived.

===== Nature =====
Although the definitions above are generally accepted, scholarly debate rages on as to the precise nature of release and waiver. According to Kerr, it is a unilateral juristic act. The power to release a debtor from his obligation rests entirely in the hands of the creditor, who need only say, 'I do not wish to avail myself of this right', in order to terminate it. SW van der Merwe and his co-authors, on the other hand, contend in Contract: General Principles that it is a liberatory agreement, i.e. a bilateral juristic act that is not a contract. RH Christie advocates a distinction according to circumstances. It is a:

- Contract (of donation) if it pertains to a right conferred by the contract
- Unilateral act if the right is conferred by law

Graham Glover calls for a different distinction:

- Release is an agreement between the parties to 'release' the debtor from having to perform.
- Waiver is a unilateral choice by the creditor to 'waive' a right.

===== Features =====
The core features of waiver (unilateral waiver especially) are set out in Alfred McAlpine & Son v Transvaal Provincial Administration. There is generally a presumption against waiver—it is assumed that one does not easily or arbitrarily waive one's rights or remedies or powers—so that the burden of proof is his who alleges it. The requirements for meeting this burden are carefully specified. Two questions should be asked, keeping in mind "the fact that persons do not as a rule lightly abandon their rights." The questions are these:

1. Was there an intention to waiver? The creditor must have had full knowledge of his rights in terms of the waived obligation.
2. Would a reasonable person in the circumstances believe the right to have been waived? This inquiry is important because a waiver need not expressly be made by the creditor; it may be "derived by implication from his conduct," in which case "his conduct must be such that it is necessarily inconsistent with an intention to maintain his rights." In other words, as De Villiers CJ put it in Smith v Momberg, "his conduct must be such as to leave no reasonable doubt in the mind that he not only knew what his rights were, but intended to surrender them."

Release and waiver can be either partial or complete. Release, however, usually entails the release of a debtor from the entire contract, whereas waiver is generally concerned only with one particular obligation or term of the contract.

==== Novation ====
A novation is an agreement to extinguish and replace one or more obligations with a new obligation or obligations. In Hugo Grotius’ words, 'An obligation is released upon the terms that simultaneously another obligation takes its place'. If the original obligation is void, the novation is also void. In South Africa, there are two forms of novation: novatio voluntaria and novatio necessaria.

===== Novatio voluntaria =====
Voet defines the former, voluntary novation, as 'a transformation and alteration of an earlier obligation, whether natural or civil, into another obligation whether natural or civil, when a fresh cause is created out of a foregoing cause in such wise that the earlier cause is destroyed'. In Swadif v Dyke, voluntary novation is described as 'essentially a matter of intention and consensus. When parties novate they intend to replace a valid contract by another valid contract'. This is novation in the strict and commonest sense: The parties novate the entire contract, but they retain their contractual relationship. Prescription ends when novation occurs.

Unless, as in the case of insurance agreements, it has been explicitly removed, the first contract can revive itself (residual position) if the second contract folds, as when voided for illegality. There is a presumption against novation, so that 'where there is doubt the court prefers not to imply a novation'. An important case in this regard is Electric Process Engraving and Stereo Co v Irwin:

The question is one of intention [.... I]n the absence of any express declaration of the parties, the intention to effect a novation cannot be held to exist except by way of necessary inference from all the circumstances of the case.

The second contract ‘...is much rather deemed to have been made in order to strengthen the first one, and for the purpose of being annexed to it, than for the purpose of extinguishing it'. Variation, in other words, is usually preferred to novation: It is generally assumed "that the parties intended only to modify, augment, or diminish the obligation, and not to extinguish the old debt, and substitute a new one, unless the contrary is particularly expressed".

===== Novatio necessaria =====
Compulsory novation, absolute in English law and much less common than voluntaria, takes place by operation of law, from 'judicial proceedings between parties whose rights and obligations are in issue between them'. Few judicial proceedings lead to novation; where they do, it is the damages awarded by the court that novate the contract.

It is important to note that 'compulsory novation does not release pledges or securities nor are sureties discharged; it does not interrupt the running of interest nor is mora purged'. This is 'because properly speaking, it is not a novation, but an additional confirmation or continuation of a previous obligation'.

==== Compromise ====
A compromise or transactio is an agreement whereby the parties settle a disputed obligation or some uncertainty between them. New obligations are created, and any existing obligations are extinguished. Compromise classically takes the form of an out-of-court settlement. Where payment is made in full and final settlement, it depends on the circumstances whether this is an offer to compromise. The general rule is that the old or former relationship falls away, and the new relationship is governed by the settlement agreement.

==== Delegation ====
Delegation or intercessio is a form of novation where, by the agreement of all concerned, someone outside of the original contract is given the responsibility of carrying out the performance agreed to in it. Three parties are concerned with this act the:

1. Delegator, or the party who incurred the obligation to perform under the contract
2. Delegatee, or the party who assumes the responsibility of performing this duty
3. Obligee, or the party to whom this performance is owed

The delegatee, in other words, is introduced as a debtor in place of the delegator (the original debtor), who is thereby discharged of his obligations. Usually this act takes the form of a full delegation of debt, and therefore a full substitution of the delegatee for the delegator. There is thus a new contract with a new debtor.

The common intention of all parties that the delegation take place may be either express or implied from the circumstances, including from the conduct of the parties.

Delegation is different from situations that, while similar, do not meet the definition provided above. For example, when a debtor asks a third party to meet the debt on his behalf, what we have is not a delegation but merely an agreement of mandate. Because the creditor knows nothing of this, and because, therefore, the common intention of all parties is lacking, it may not be said that a new contract has been created. Even when the debtor requests of the creditor that in future he refer to the third party for payment, this amounts only to an assignation of debt; the third party steps in of his own initiative—ex promiso. This does not amount to novation.

==== Effluxion of time ====
If a contract fixes a specific period for its duration, it terminates automatically at the end of such period. The Consumer Protection Act contains mandatory rules on fixed-term contracts covered by the Act.

==== Notice ====
Long-standing contracts, or contracts for an indefinite period, are terminable upon reasonable notice unless specifically agreed otherwise.

Express notice is given especially in the case of leases. A lease may be terminated on due notice of usually a month. Hybrid contracts have a fixed time as well as a termination option.

Notice may also be given impliedly. In situations where the contract is silent as to when it terminates, the reasonable-time test is usually deployed. Where reasonable time has passed, a party may terminate the contract on reasonable notice. The standard for reasonableness is tested with reference primarily to the type of contract in question.

If it is determined that the contract may be terminated by reasonable notice, the rules are set out by Smalberger JA in Putco v TV & Radio Guarantee:

- Either party is entitled to give notice for any valid commercial reason.
- "Reasonable" is a relative term; what is reasonable depends on the circumstances of each case.
- The notice of termination must be clear and unequivocal.

=== Termination by operation of law ===
Obligations may also be terminated by law, as in the case of set-off, merger, supervening impossibility of performance, prescription, insolvency and death.

==== Set-off ====
Where two parties are reciprocally indebted to one another by reason of distinct obligations, one debt may be set off against the other to forestall the onerous burden of two different sets of possible litigation. The set-off occurs automatically, provided that its requirements are met, but applies only to liquidated claims: that is, to money only, not to pending debts. These are quickly and easily proved.

Set-off (or compensatio) might in its simplest form be instanced thus:

- Gore owes Hitchens R1,000 for a couch (the first obligation).
- Hitchens owes Gore R1,000 for rent (the second).
- The first obligation is set off against the other.
- There are now no further obligations between the parties.

Very rarely, however, are the obligations identical. Where one party's is greater than the other's, the smaller claim terminates and the greater diminishes. This usually occurs by way of a claim that is followed by a counterclaim.

==== Merger ====
The extinction of a debt by merger (or confusio) occurs when one person becomes both creditor and debtor in respect of a debt. This is a rare but straightforward form of termination, described in Grootchwaing Salt Works v Van Tonder as "the concurrence of two qualities or capacities in the same person, which mutually destroy one another". Tjakie Naudé provides an example:

A owes B R100. B dies and leaves her estate to A. A is now both debtor and creditor in respect of the debt of R100, so that the debt is extinguished by merger.

Similarly, if a tenant decides to buy the property he is renting, he would not thereby become his own landlord; the relationship would be merged and thus cease to exist.

==== Insolvency ====
In the event of the debtor's insolvency (or liquidation if it is a company), the contract is not terminated immediately; its resolution is left to a trustee or judicial manager, to whom the insolvent estate is handed over. This party decides whether to terminate the contract or to settle it, or else to keep it alive if this is in the best interests of the estate. The procedure is governed by the Insolvency Act.

==== Supervening impossibility of performance ====
Supervening impossibility of performance takes place where an event that occurs (or supervenes) after the contract has commenced objectively renders the contract no longer performable . This event must have been unforeseen and unavoidable by a reasonable person, such that no-one in that position could have fulfilled the obligation.

The distinction between supervening and initial impossibility (which does not terminate the contract) is an important one and often confused: The performance must have become objectively impossible, even if at first it was perfectly doable.

These circumstances, however, must have arisen due to some unavoidable and supervening event; the cause must not have been the debtor's fault. In Peters, Flamman and Company v Kokstad Municipality, for example, a company was wound up during World War I by the Smuts government, which had declared its German owners to be enemies of state. In consequence, the company was unable any longer to carry out its contractual obligations. Kokstad Municipality sued for breach of contract, but the judge determined that, because of the supervening circumstances, performance was objectively impossible (casus fortuitus); the contract should therefore be terminated.

Generic goods and services are not subject to supervening impossibility, because they are easily obtainable and performance is still theoretically executable. An inability to meet one's debts is also precluded, because it entails fault. The impossibility must, in an objective sense, be outside of one's control. The following are classic examples:

- Vis maior: an act of god, beyond one's control; fault is precluded and performance rendered objectively impossible.
- Casus fortuitus: intervention by the state or legislature which renders performance impossible.

Supervening impossibility generally terminates the obligation, as well as any counter-obligation, from the point at which impossibility arose. Accrued rights are enforceable, but future obligations disappear. Where, however, there has been a guarantee of performance, this overrides the supervening impossibility—even acts of god.

The effect of partial or temporary impossibility of performance depends on the circumstances of the case. The general rule is that the contract is suspended until the impossibility disappears; if the supervening event goes on for an unreasonably long period of time, the creditor may cancel.

==== Prescription ====
A person can lose or acquire rights because of the passage of time. The enforceability of obligations is also limited by time.

===== Extinctive prescription =====
Extinctive prescription entails the termination of obligations, and therefore their enforceability, by lapse of time. This ensures finality in business affairs and provides an incentive for persons to enforce their rights when they become due. It is regulated by the Prescription Act and the Institution of Legal Proceedings Against Certain Organs of State Act. The former indicates that claims to a debt are restricted to a certain period of time, after which they fall away; one has to exercise one's rights within that period if one desires performance. This residual time amounts to three years, and prescription begins to run when "the debt falls due". Furthermore, "a debt shall not be deemed to be due until certain requirements are satisfied". These are, on the part of the creditor:

1. "Knowledge of the identity of the debtor"
2. "Knowledge of the facts from which the debt arose...provided the creditor shall be deemed to have such knowledge if he could have acquired it by exercising reasonable care".

Prescription is backdated accordingly, if necessary.

Gerike v Sack was a delict case. On 13 February 1971, Gerike was injured when Sack's motorboat crashed into her. Summons was only served on Sack on 14 February 1974. Gerike acknowledged that technically, under the Prescription Act, her claim had prescribed, but argued that in fact it had not, in terms of section 12(3), because she had only discovered the identity of motorboat driver some time later. The court disagreed, finding on the evidence that, instead of leaving everything to her husband, and thereby paying a purely passive role in the identification, she could herself have asked the one question required to establish Sacks's identity. She had not exercised 'reasonable care', in other words.

In Jacobs v Adonis, Jacobs was, in August 1988, a passenger in Adonis's vehicle when an accident occurred, rendering him paraplegic. He also suffered memory loss, such that he had no recollection of the incident. Adonis told Jacobs that his injuries had been sustained in a hit-and-run, so that there was no one to sue. Jacobs duly claimed compensation from the Road Accident Fund. Some time later, the discovery was made that it had in fact been Adonis who caused the accident. Jacobs accordingly sued him. Because he had had no knowledge of the debtor or of the true facts of the accident until these revelations, Jacobs's claim was well within the three-year period, and Adonis's defence of extinctive prescription could not stand.

The Prescription Act counters slow or busy courts with a provision to the effect that "the running of prescription shall be interrupted by the service on the debtor of any process whereby the creditor claims payment on the debt", on the grounds that it would be unfair to penalise someone for the tardiness of the administrative process. As soon as one serves a summons, therefore, prescription is interrupted.

===== Acquisitive prescription =====
Acquisitive prescription describes the acquisition of property, or rights of ownership, and therefore falls outside the scope of contract law.

==== Death ====
Contractual rights and duties are generally transmissible on death, although not in the case of a delectus personae or an express or tacit agreement to the contrary, in which case resolution of the contract is left to the executor of the deceased's estate.

== Drafting ==
The contracting parties' main objective during contract negotiation should be to reach a consensus regarding the exact object of their agreement on the best commercial terms and conditions. To be valid, certain contracts must be notarially executed, e.g. antenuptial or prospecting agreements and mining leases, in which case they are called 'deeds' and are public instruments.

=== Commencement ===
It is vital to first identify the type of undertaking and describe the contracting parties. The parties and their contact details should be properly described in the contract document.

=== Nature and recitals ===
The agreement's nature depends on its contents. When the contract is nominate, care must be taken to include the essentialia for that agreement in the contract. Following the commencement should come clauses setting out the causa of the contract, its object and the extent of the parties' obligations, much of which is typically found in the recitals.

=== Effective date ===
The contract should be properly signed and dated to be effective. The contract may be dated in the introductory or execution clauses.

=== Sequence of clauses ===
The contract should be structured in a logical and practical fashion. After the commencement, recitals and the definitions and interpretation clause, the operative provisions should appear.

==== Specific terms ====
First come core provisions that set out the undertakings and primary obligations specifically negotiated by the parties for their contractual relationship, such as clauses on the remedies for breach of contract, including cancellation, penalty, forfeiture, limitation and exemption clauses; and conditions and time periods.

==== General terms ====
Then follow general clauses on variation, severability, entire agreement, cession, waiver, domicilium citandi et executandi (notices, address for service), applicable law and jurisdiction, alternative dispute resolution procedures, force majeure (vis major and casus fortuitus), costs, and confidentiality.

=== Structure and language ===
Lastly, principles of good language and grammar, and proper numbering, should be used throughout.

== Authorities ==
=== Cases ===
- ABSA Bank Ltd v Sweet and Others 1993 (1) SA 318 (C).
- Afrox Healthcare Ltd v Strydom 2002 (6) SA 21 (SCA).
- Alexander v Perry (1874) 4 Buch 59.
- Alfred McAlpine & Son (Pty) Ltd v Transvaal Provincial Administration 1974 (3) SA 506 (A).
- Alfred McAlpine & Son (Pty) Ltd v Transvaal Provincial Administration 1977 (4) SA 310 (T).
- Aucamp v Morton 1949 (3) SA 611 (A).
- Barkhuizen v Napier 2007 (5) SA 323 (CC).
- Bay Loan Investment (Pty) Ltd v Bay View (Pty) Ltd 1971 (4) SA 538 (C).
- Benson v SA Mutual Life Assurance Society 1986 (1) SA 776 (A).
- BK Tooling (Edms) Bpk v Scope Precision Engineering (Edms) Bpk 1979 (1) SA 391 (A).
- Bonne Fortune Beleggings Bpk v Kalahari Salt Works (Pty) Ltd 1974 (1) SA 414 (NC).
- Botha v Fick 1995 (2) SA 750 (A).
- Bredenkamp v Standard Bank 2010 (4) SA 468 (SCA).
- Broderick Properties Ltd v Rood 1962 (4) SA 447 (T).
- Cassim v Kadir 1962 (2) SA 473 (N).
- Cinema City (Pty) Ltd v Morgenstern Family Estates (Pty) Ltd and Others 1980 (1) SA 796 (A).
- Concrete Products v Natal Leather Industries 1946 NPD 377.
- Conradie v Rossouw 1919 AD 279.
- Coopers & Lybrand and Others v Bryant 1995 (3) SA 761 (AD).
- Corondimas and Another v Badat 1946 AD 548.
- Coutts v Jacobs 1927 EDL 120.
- Culverwell v Brown 1990 (1) SA 7 (A).
- Datacolour International (Pty) Ltd v Intamarket (Pty) Ltd 2001 (2) SA 284 (SCA).
- Delmas Milling Co Ltd v Du Plessis 1955 (3) SA 447 (A).
- Drifter's Adventure Tours CC v Hircock 2007 (2) SA 83 (SCA).
- Durban's Water Wonderland (Pty) Ltd v Botha 1999 (1) SA 982 (SCA).
- Engelbrecht v Senwes 2007 (3) SA 29 (SCA).
- First National Bank of SA Ltd v Lynn NO and Others 1996 (2) SA 339 (A).
- First National Bank of SA Ltd v Rosenblum and Another 2001 (4) SA 189 (SCA).
- Fourie v CDMO Homes (Pty) Ltd 1982 (1) SA 21 (A).
- Fundstrust v Van Deventer 1997 (1) SA 710 (A).
- Gericke v Sack 1978 (1) SA 821 (A).
- Goldblatt v Merwe 1902 (19) SC 373.
- Golden Cape Fruits (Pty) Ltd v Fotoplate (Pty) Ltd 1973 (2) SA 642 (C).
- Government of the Republic of South Africa v Fibrespinners & Weavers (Pty) Ltd 1978 (2) SA 794 (A).
- Government of the Republic of South Africa v Thabiso Chemicals (Pty) Ltd 2009 (1) SA 163 (SCA).
- Grootchwaing Salt Works Ltd v Van Tonder 1920 AD 492.
- Hansen, Schrader & Co. v De Gasperi 1903 TH 100.
- Harris v Pieters 1920 AD 644.
- Haynes v King William's Town Municipality 1951 (2) SA 371 (A).
- Hepner v Roodepoort-Maraisburg Town Council 1962 (4) SA 772 (A).
- Holmdene Brickworks (Pty) Ltd v Roberts Construction Co Ltd 1977 (3) SA 670 (A).
- Hyprop Investments v Shoprite Checkers 2011 ZASCA 51.
- Jacobs v Adonis 1996 (4) SA 246 (C).
- Jaga v Dönges 1950 (4) SA 653 (A).
- Johnson v General Insurances Ltd 1983 (1) SA 318 (A).
- Johnston v Leal 1980 (3) SA 927 (A).
- Joubert v Enslin 1910 AD 6.
- KPMG Chartered Accountants (SA) v Securefin LTD and Another 2009 (4) SA 399 (SCA).
- Lavery & Co Ltd v Jungheinrich 1931 AD 156.
- Le Riche v Hamman 1946 AD 648.
- List v Jungers 1979 (3) SA 106 (A).
- MacDuff & Co Ltd (in Liquidation) v Johannesburg Consolidated Investment Co Ltd 1924 AD 573.
- Magna Alloys v Ellis 1984 (4) SA 874 (A). 1984 109/84 SAFLII.
- Marnitz v Stark 1952 (2) SA 144 (N).
- Martin v De Kock 1948 (2) SA 719 (AD).
- Maseko v Maseko 1992 (3) SA 190 (W).
- Meyer v Merchants Trust Ltd 1942 AD 244.
- Minister of Education and Another v Syfrets Trust Ltd NO and Another 2006 (4) SA 205 (C).
- Motor Racing Enterprises (in liquidation) v NPS (Electronics) Ltd 1996 (4) SA 950 (A).
- Nash v Golden Dumps (Pty) Ltd 1985 (3) SA 1 (A).
- Nedcor Bank Ltd v Hyperlec Electrical & Mechanical Supplies CC 2000 (2) SA 880 (T).
- Oatorian Properties (Pty) Ltd v Maroun 1973 (3) SA 779 (A).
- Odendaalsrust Municipality v New Nigel Estate Gold Mining Co Ltd 1948 (2) SA 656 (O).
- Paiges v Van Ryn Gold Mines Estates Ltd 1920 AD 600.
- Palm Fifteen (Pty) Ltd v Cotton Tail Homes (Pty) Ltd 1978 (2) SA 872 (A).
- Peri-Urban Areas Health Board v Tomaselli and Another 1962 (3) SA 346 (A).
- Peters, Flamman and Company v Kokstad Municipality 1919 AD 427.
- Putco Ltd v TV & Radio Guarantee Co (Pty) Ltd and Other Related Cases 1985 (4) SA 809 (A).
- Rand Rietfontein Estates Ltd v Cohn 1937 A.D. 317 at 325.
- Reigate v Union Manufacturing Co 1918 (1) KB 592.
- Rood v Wallach 1904 TS 187.
- Santos Professional Football Club (Pty) Ltd v Igesund and Another 2003 (5) SA 73 (C).
- Sasfin (Pty) Ltd v Beukes 1989 (1) SA 1 (A).
- Schmidt v Dwyer 1959 (3) SA 896 (C).
- Scott v Poupard 1971 (2) SA 373 (A).
- Segal v Mazzur 1920 CPD 634.
- Shatz Investments (Pty) Ltd v Kalovyrnas 1976 (2) SA 545 (A).
- Shirlaw v Southern Foundries 1939 (2) KB 206.
- Smith v Momberg 1895 (12) SC 295.
- Soja (Pty) Ltd v Tuckers Land and Development Corporation (Pty) Ltd 1981 (3) SA 314 (A).
- Stewart Wrightson (Pty) Ltd v Thorpe 1977 (2) SA 943 (A).
- Steyn v LSA Motors Ltd 1994 (1) SA 49 (A).
- Strachan v Prinsloo 1925 TPD 709.
- Swadif (Pty) Ltd v Dyke NO 1978 (1) SA 928 (A).
- Swartz & Son v Wolmaransstad Town Council 1960 (2) SA 1 (T).
- Thompson v Scholtz 1999 (1) SA 233 (SCA).
- Thoroughbred Breeders' Association v Price Waterhouse 2001 (4) SA 551 (SCA).
- Trotman v Edwick 1951 (1) SA 443 (A).
- Tucker's Land and Development Corporation v Hovis 1980 (1) SA 645 (A).
- Tucker's Land and Development Corporation (Pty) Ltd v Strydom 1984 (1) SA 1 (A).
- Union Government v Vianini Ferro-Concrete Pipes (Pty) Ltd 1941 AD 43.
- Van der Merwe v Nedcor Bank Bpk 2003 (1) SA 169 (SCA).
- Van der Westhuizen v Arnold 2002 (6) SA 453 (SCA).
- Van Wyk v Lewis 1924 AD 438.
- Victoria Falls & Transvaal Power Co Ltd v Consolidated Langlaagte Mines Ltd 1915 AD 1.
- Walker v Redhouse 2007 (3) SA 514.
- Weinberg v Olivier 1943 AD 181.
- Wells v SA Alumenite Co 1927 AD 69.
- Wilkens v Voges 1994 (3) SA 130 (A).
- Willowdene Landowners (Pty) Ltd v St Martin's Trust 1971 (1) SA 302 (T).
- World Leisure Holidays (Pty) Ltd v Georges 2002 (5) SA 531 (W).

=== Statutes ===
- Alienation of Land Act 68 of 1981.
- Auditing Profession Act 26 of 2005.
- Consumer Protection Act 68 of 2008.
- Conventional Penalties Act 15 of 1962.
- Insolvency Act 24 of 1936.
- Institution of Legal Proceedings Against Certain Organs of State Act 40 of 2002.
- National Credit Act 34 of 2005.
- Prescribed Rate of Interest Act 55 of
- South African Reserve Bank Act 90 of 1989.

== See also ==
- Contract
- English contract law
- Law of South Africa
- Law of obligations
