= Ntshiqa v Andreas Supermarket =

South African legal case

In Ntshiqa v Andreas Supermarket (Pty) Ltd, an important case in the South African law of lease, the parties entered into a written lease agreement in terms whereof Ntshiqa (the lessor) let to Andreas Supermarket (the lessee) certain business premises for a period of five years for the operation of a supermarket. The agreement provided that, in the event of non-payment of rent, or the breach of any condition of the lease, the lessor would be entitled to cancel the lease and retake possession of the premises.

When the supermarket failed to pay the rental for the month of December 1995, Ntshiqa cancelled the lease agreement and instituted action for the eviction of Andreas Supermarket and payment of the unpaid rental. Throughout the period starting from December 1995, up to and including the date the matter was argued, the supermarket had not paid any rent, contending that it was entitled to a rental remission for two reasons:

1. Ntshiqa had failed to provide toilet facilities on the premises as it had undertaken to do; and
2. Ntshiqa had built business premises adjacent to those occupied by the supermarket and diverted electricity from the latter premises to the others, causing frequent power cuts and damage to the supermarket's perishable goods.

The supermarket contended accordingly that its use and enjoyment of the business premises had been limited and that this gave rise to its claim for a reduction of the amount of rental. The issue to be decided by the court was whether or not a lessee is entitled to withhold payment of rental on the basis of the contentions set out above.

It could not be gainsaid, the court held, that the lessee in this case had undertaken to pay full rental in exchange for, among other things, being afforded full use and enjoyment of the leased property by the lessor. A tenant pays rental as a consideration for the enjoyment and use of the premises; if a tenant has not had full enjoyment and use of the premises, he was only liable for such rental as accords with such enjoyment and use. Furthermore, the court held, the tenant is not obliged to give up possession of the premises before he may claim a reduction in rental; nor has he to pay the full rental and then reclaim a pro rata portion by way of an action for damages.

The court held that both the non-provision of the toilet facilities and the frequent power failures had adversely affected the use and enjoyment of the leased premises. This limited use and enjoyment was of such a nature as to entitle the supermarket to remission of rental. Ntshiqa, therefore, could not claim payment of the full rental if he had not performed his part of the bargain: giving the supermarket full and beneficial occupation of the premises.

Furthermore, as the supermarket was not only entitled to remission of rental, but could in fact even raise the exceptio non adimpleti contractus, which "applies to all contracts where the obligations of the parties are reciprocal," Ntshiqa was not entitled to cancel the contract. Such purported cancellation amounted to nothing but repudiation of the lease agreement by the applicant.

The supermarket, therefore, was entitled as the aggrieved party to elect either to keep the contract in being or to cancel it. The former had been chosen, so the agreement was still of full force.

== See also ==
- South African law of lease
