= Pete's Warehousing v Bowsink Investments =

South African legal case

In Pete's Warehousing and Sales CC v Bowsink Investments CC, an important case in the South African law of lease, Pete's Warehousing (the lessee) and Bowsink Investments (the lessor) entered into an agreement of lease in terms of which Pete's Warehousing hired certain premises from Bowsink Investments for use as a storage warehouse.

== Legal background of the lease ==
Clause 12.1 of the lease provided as follows:

The lessor does not warrant or represent that the premises are fit for the purpose of the business to be conducted in terms of this lease or any other purpose.

Clause 19 provided that Pete's Warehousing must give written notice of any defects within ten days of occupation and return the premises in good order at the expiry of the lease. Clause 25.3 provided that the Pete's Warehousing might withhold payments due if the premises were in a defective condition. Clause 25.4 provided that the Bowsink Investments was not responsible for any damage sustained on the premises by leakage or by rain, hail, wind, lightning, flood, explosion or fire.

== Findings of the court ==
When Pete's Warehousing purported to cancel the lease, Bowsink Investments instituted an action for damages. Pete's Warehousing pleaded that the lease contained a residual implied term that Bowsink Investments was obliged initially to place the leased premises in a condition reasonably fit for the purpose for which they were let, which term had been breached. To this plea Bowsink Investments excepted that it disclosed no defence, inasmuch as such an implied term was inconsistent with, and excluded by, the express terms of the lease.

Kroon J held that, in the absence of any contrary term therein, a lease contained an implied residual term that the lessor was obliged initially to place the leased premises in a condition reasonably fit for the purpose for which they are let.

In interpreting clause 12.1, the court held that it was not permissible merely to look at its wording. The language had to be construed in the light of the nature and purpose of the contract, and also the context of the words in the contract as a whole. Moreover, a clause which sought to limit, or might be seen as limiting, residual implied or common-law obligations, had to be restrictively interpreted. Thus the clause could reasonably be interpreted as providing merely that, in the limited context of the lessee having to secure a licence for (or otherwise having to comply with the requirements of a local or other authority in respect of) the business it intended to conduct at the premises, the lessor did not warrant or represent that the premises were fit for the purpose of that business or any other business.

Furthermore, clause 19.1 did no more than provide for the extent of the lessee's obligation in respect of the condition in which the premises and its appurtenances were to be returned at the end of the lease. Clause 25.3, furthermore, did not indicate that the lessee could not raise any complaint about the condition of the premises at any stage during the lease, but remained liable to pay rental whatever that condition might be.

Clause 25.4 of the lease was intended to circumscribe the lessor's liability in respect of damage that might be caused to the lessee's property as a result of defects to the premises. The fact that a clause might, in very wide terms, relieve a lessor from liability for damage which the lessee suffered because of defects did not mean that the former was relieved from all obligations to the latter; the latter might still avail himself of all residual obligations to the lessor which were not excluded by the written lease.

The court held, therefore, that the express terms of the lease did not exclude the implied term relied upon by the lessee, and that the exception had to be dismissed.

== See also ==
- South African law of lease
