= Delmas Milling v Du Plessis =

South African legal case

Delmas Milling Co Ltd. v Du Plessis is an important case in South African contract law. It was heard in the Appellate Division by Centlivres CJ, Schreiner JA, Van Den Heever JA, Hoexter JA and Fagan JA on June 13, 1955, with judgment handed down on June 20. It was an appeal from a decision in the Transvaal Provincial Division, which it upheld.

== Facts ==
In June 1953, a document was signed, on behalf of Delmas Milling, by JF du Plessis in confirmation. It read as follows:

We beg to confirm the purchase of, 2,750/3,250 Bags

New Season Kidney Beans As Inspected On Farm Strydpan

Price Eighty shillings 80/ - Per Bag Of

Terms 200 lbs. Nett Delivered.

Delivered in good order and condition at Delmas Milling Co.

Mills At Delmas.

For Delivery Up To The 10/7/53.

Failing delivery within the prescribed time the above

price is subject to adjustment.

All deliveries must be in accordance with Grades

specified above.

Please note that all conditions mentioned herein

must be strictly adhered to.

Payment On Delivery

At Mill.

The sections italicised were in writing; the remainder of the document was printed.

In a declaration claiming damages for an alleged breach of contract, Delmas contended that it had, at Du Plessis's request, extended the date of delivery to July 20, 1953, and that Du Plessis, after delivering 1,000 bags of beans, had then refused to deliver the remaining 1,750. The damages claimed were in respect of this balance; the alleged breach was Du Plessis's failure to perform within the prescribed time.

Du Plessis pleaded that, having delivered 1,000 bags before the stipulated date, he was contractually only obliged to deliver the balance when the contract price had been adjusted, and that Delmas had refused to agree on a mutual adjustment. Delmas excepted to this plea and applied to strike out certain portions of it. The disputed clause was the sentence which begins "Failing delivery..."

The Provincial Division dismissed both the exception and the application to strike out.

== Findings ==
Centlivres held that the effect of the disputed clause was to make the contract an option to sell. If the contract was to be construed as one of purchase and sale, the clause must have been inserted for the benefit of the respondent, in which case he could not be said to be taking advantage of his own wrong (in failing to deliver by the stipulated date) when he relied on the clause. The court held further that, as there was no ambiguity in the meaning of the disputed clause, evidence of surrounding circumstances could not affect that meaning.

Schreiner found that the word "purchase" was inconsistent with a mere option to sell, and held that, when there is a serious difficulty in interpreting a contract, and the court is not obliged to decide the matter on exception, it should not do so.

Hoexter held that the exception to the plea had rightly been dismissed on the grounds that the contract could be construed as a mere option to sell, not on the grounds that it was incapable of any other meaning.

The decision in the Provincial Division was thus confirmed.

== Interpretation ==
"It is apparently an abiding problem," noted Schreiner,

to determine where the line is to be drawn between difficulties in the interpretation of a written contract that can and must be solved by linguistic construction only and difficulties which it is permissible to clear away by consideration of surrounding circumstances, as distinguished from facts merely required to identify persons and things mentioned in the contract.

Delmas Milling v Du Plessis is most often cited as precedent in the area of contractual interpretation, with Schreiner's stipulation that there "appear to be three broad classes of evidence" to be used when documents fall to be interpreted:

1. Where, although there be difficulty in interpretation, "perhaps serious difficulty," it can nevertheless be cleared up by linguistic treatment, this must be done: "The only permissible additional evidence in such cases is of an identificatory nature; such evidence is really not used for interpretation but only to apply the contract to the facts. Such application may, of course, be itself the cause of the difficulty, giving rise to what is sometimes called a latent ambiguity."
2. If the difficulty cannot be cleared up with sufficient certainty by studying the language, recourse may be had to "surrounding circumstances"—matters probably present to the minds of the parties when they contracted (but not actual negotiations and similar statements): "It is commonly said that the Court is entitled to be informed of all such circumstances in all cases [...]. But this does not mean that if sufficient certainty as to the meaning can be gathered from the language alone it is nevertheless permissible to reach a different result by drawing inferences from the surrounding circumstances. Whether there is sufficient certainty in the language of even very badly drafted contracts to make it unnecessary and therefore wrong to draw inferences from the surrounding circumstances is a matter of individual judicial opinion on each case."
3. The third and final class is where even the use of surrounding circumstances does not provide "sufficient certainty." These are cases of ambiguity in the narrow sense: After surrounding circumstances have been considered, there is still no substantial balance in favour of one meaning over another. Recourse may then be had to what passed between the parties on the subject of the contract. The court should use outside evidence as conservatively as possible - but use it, it must if necessary to reach what seems to be a sufficient degree of certainty as to the right meaning.

== See also ==
- South African contract law
- Coopers & Lybrand v Bryant
