= Schmidt v Dwyer =

South African legal case

Schmidt v Dwyer is an important case in South African contract law and the South African law of lease, heard in the Cape Provincial Division by De Villiers JP and Van Wyk J on August 5, 1957, with judgment handed down on August 23. It is important for its consideration of voetstoots clauses and its determination that these cannot nullify warranties.

== Facts ==
A written deed of sale of a farm, after describing the property and its approximate extent, added that "the property includes approximately 120,000 vines planted thereon." Another clause provided that "the property is sold as it stands and the seller shall not be held responsible for any defects therein whether patent or latent."

In fact, there were only 67,000 vines planted on the farm. The purchaser accordingly claimed damages

1. for breach of warranty; or, alternatively,
2. by reason of the misrepresentation.

== Judgment ==
In an exception to the declaration, the court held that ex facie the deed of sale the statement therein regarding the number of vines on the property amounted to a warranty, and that, as the voetstoots clause had no bearing on this statement, that clause did not debar the plaintiff from relying upon the representation. The exceptions and application to strike out were dismissed with costs.

== See also ==
- South African contract law
- South African law of lease
- Coopers & Lybrand v Bryant
