= Sweets from Heaven v Ster Kinekor =

South African legal case

In Sweets from Heaven (Pty) Ltd and Another v Ster Kinekor Films (Pty) Ltd and Another, an important case in the South African law of lease, Ster Kinekor was a lessee which had entered into a five-year sublease with Sweets from Heaven. The second respondent was a franchise of the first applicant and occupied the premises through first applicant with the consent of Nu Metro.

The dispute which arose was regarding the right of Ster Kinekor to sublet a shop virtually next door to Sweets from Heaven, as both entities sold similar products (sweets, confectionery and related products).

The court a quo granted an interim interdict prohibiting the franchise to occupy the premises, based on the failure to provide free and undisturbed use of the premises.

The applicants based their claim on

- Ster Kinekor's failure to ensure free and undisturbed use and enjoyment of the leased premises in allowing the second respondent to compete with the second applicant; and
- a tacit or implied term that the lessor would not permit the conduct of a business in competition with the business of the second applicant in close proximity of the latter's shop.

The court referred to Pothier and Sishen Hotel (Edms) Bpk v Suid-Afrikaanse Yster en Staal Industriële Korporasie Bpk, but held that an impairment of usus alone is insufficient to found liability. Ster Kinekor would only be liable if its conduct constituted a breach of contract; therefore the issue must be decided on the express and tacit terms of a contract.

A lessee of business premises, then, will succeed in a claim against a lessor for reduced profitability caused by the lessor's conduct only if the lessee is able to prove that the parties either explicitly or tacitly agreed that they would refrain from such conduct.

On the facts however, there was no evidence of a tacit term being breached; therefore, there was no breach of contract.

Kerr points out that the formulation of the application in Sweets from Heaven clearly indicates that the applicants meant to differ between tacit and implied terms. He raises the possibility that the court may have overlooked the distinction between the two categories and recommends the introduction of a different word, namely "residual terms," for provisions which the law adds in the absence of agreement by the parties.

Of paramount importance here is Kerr's statement of the law, where he suggests that "the lessee needs to prove that the deprivation of commodus usus is the result of a breach of a provision of the contract, whether that provision is express or passes the hypothetical bystander test or is added by law in the absence of agreement by the parties."

The reliance by the court on Wilkens NO v Voges, which deals with tacit terms and the near similarity in the meaning of the words "implied" and "tacit," had the result that Malan J failed to deal with the alternative pleading regarding the residual term, which the law adds in the absence of agreement by the parties.

== See also ==
- South African law of lease
