= Jordaan v Verwey =

In Jordaan NO and Another v Verwey, an important case in the South African law of lease, the parties entered into an oral contract which they described as a lease. The alleged lessee was given the right to use five orchards, in return for which he was obliged to install and commission a microjetting system in that orchard of the leased premises known as "Girlsland."

When the alleged lessee failed to install and commission the system, the alleged lessor issued summons to compel him to do so.

The court referred to the case of Black v Scheepers, where it was held that rent had to be paid in money or fruits, and that the provision of meals was not rent.

On appeal, it was argued that payment for light and water, which were undertaken as separate obligations, could be counted as rent. The court said that this was incorrect.

The court held that practical considerations are decisive. The essential different between lease agreements and other agreements lies in the rule relating to the nature of the consideration payable.

It is not in accordance with public policy that parties should find themselves in a position different from that to which they thought they had agreed. The court held, however, that the contract was not a lease, as the consideration was something other than money or fruits.

The judgment of the court has been criticised by the eminent scholar AJ Kerr, who observes that the court does not explain what it has in mind when it refers to "practical considerations." It is correct, he acknowledges, that the court must consider the true nature of the contract even if the parties use terminology relevant to lease contracts. In Jordaan, both parties intended their contract to be a lease, but the court held that it could not be a lease. Kerr argues that, if the court had recognised the contract as a lease, neither of the parties, nor any third party, would have been prejudiced. Kerr concludes that the decision in Jordaan ought not to be followed, hoping that in future the courts will follow Rubin v Botha instead or, if they do not, that they will develop the law to allow rent to be paid in money or in other ways not limited to fruits

== See also ==
- Rubin v Botha
- South African law of lease
