= Benlou Properties v Vector Graphics =

South African legal case

Benlou Properties (Pty) Ltd v Vector Graphics (Pty) Ltd is an important case in the South African law of lease.

== Facts ==
Benlou Properties (the lessor) and Vector Graphics (the lessee) entered into a lease agreement. Clause 8.5 entitled Benlou Properties to recover 74.4 per cent of any increase in its expenditure on certain items from Vector Graphics.

Approximately two years after the conclusion of the agreement, Vector Graphics sought an order to declare the clause invalid, contending

- that the amounts payable in terms of clause 8.5 constituted additional rent;
- that such amounts were not determined in, nor determinable from, the written agreement; and
- that clause 8.5, and consequently the entire agreement, was accordingly void.

The court a quo held that a number of the provisions of clause 8.5, read with certain other clauses, were invalid because they conferred a discretion on Benlou Properties to determine various costs and charges, of which a substantial portion would have to be borne by Vector Graphics.

== Appeal ==
On appeal, the court noted the issue to be this: May the parties to a lease validly agree that, as part of his obligation to pay rent, the tenant has to contribute to circumscribed expenditure incurred by the landlord in his discretion?

The court held that Benlou Properties' discretion to determine the extent of the respondent's liability under the provisions of clause 8.5 was subject to three qualifications:

1. that only a defined share (74.4 per cent) of the increased expenditure could be recovered from Vector Graphics;
2. that such expenditure had actually to be incurred by Benlou Properties, in the sense of an increased contractual liability towards a third party; and
3. that Vector Graphics was only obliged to contribute to increased expenditure incurred by Benlou Properties after the date of commencement of negotiations in respect of certain specified items.

The court noted that the Roman-Dutch authorities regarded a lease in terms of which the rent was to be determined by the lessor or lessee, in his unfettered discretion, as invalid. This, however, was not the situation in casu, inasmuch as Benlou Properties could not, in terms of clause 8.5, unilaterally and simply of its own volition, impose an obligation upon Vector Graphics. It had first to bind itself to a third party and so incur contractual liability. Furthermore, the rule that the determination of rent could not be left to one of the parties had to be confined to the situation where the determination depended entirely upon the unfettered will of that party. There was also no policy reason why an undertaking by one party to compensate the other for expenditure to be incurred by the latter, albeit in his discretion, should necessarily be invalid.

Since it was clear that Vector Graphics's liability under clause 8.5 was not determined by increased expenditure incurred in the unfettered discretion of Benlou Properties, it was unnecessary to decide whether Vector Graphics was liable to contribute to increased expenditure which was objectively reasonable, or to such expenditure incurred arbitrio boni viri because, on either construction, the provisions of clause 8.5 were unobjectionable.

The appeal was allowed, therefore, with costs.

== See also ==
- South African law of lease
