= Law of obligations (Bulgaria) =

Bulgarian contract law

In Bulgaria, the law of obligations is set out by the Obligations and Contracts Act (OCA). According to article 20a, OCA contracts shall have the force of law for the parties that conclude them.

== Contract ==
In Bulgaria, the contract is one of the prerequisites for the development of obligatory relations. The term contract refers to a bilateral legal transaction, which consists of two declarations of intent (offer and acceptance) that must be linked to each other and match in their contents. A contract is considered concluded from the moment in which the acceptance reaches the offeror.

=== Form of Contract ===
The Obligations and Contracts Act provides that contracts of ownership transfer and those of establishing other property rights on real estate must be executed through a notarial deed.

=== Contract Invalidity ===
Contracts that violate legal requirements or show other legal deficits are invalid. Regarding invalid contracts, there are two subgroups to distinguish: void contracts and voidable contracts.

=== Voidable contracts ===
Initially, voidable contracts are contracts that are valid and binding unless avoided or declared void by a party to them on the grounds prescribed by the law. General legal provisions regarding these grounds are provided in the Bulgarian Obligations and Contracts Act (OCA); specific legal provisions are (inter alia) contained in the Family code, the Law on Protection of Competition and the Inheritance law. Invalidation may be claimed only by the party in whose interest the law allows such invalidation. A contract subject to invalidation may be ratified by the party entitled to demand its invalidation, by way of an instrument in writing which should indicate the grounds for invalidation. A contract shall also be ratified where the party entitled to demand its invalidation voluntarily performs it, in whole or in part, being aware of the grounds for invalidation. A contract which is subject to invalidation on grounds of extreme necessity may not be ratified. According to art. 27 OCA a contract may be subject to invalidation of the following grounds:

- Legal incapacity – if a contract is concluded by incapable persons or by their representatives not respecting the specific legal provisions for representation;
- According to Article 28 of the Act, a material mistake may cause the cancellation of the contract. If the contract has been concluded with regard to a specific person being one of the parties to it (intuitu personae) a mistake concerning this person may render the contract void.
- Fraud - According to Article 29 of the Act, a fraud may cause the cancellation of the contract under the condition that one party has been deceived maliciously to enter into the contractual relationship. If the fraud has been induced by a third party, the deceived party may request the cancellation of the contract if the other party knew or ought to have known of the fraud.
- A contract may be cancelled if one of the contracting parties concluded the contract out of reasonable fear induced by threats from the other party or third person.
- Incapacity to comprehend one's own actions - If a person capable of acting is enabled to comprehend his own actions while concluding a contract, the contract may be cancelled.
- Stringent necessity - The contract is voidable as well if it has been concluded under stringent necessity and under apparently unfavorable conditions for one of the parties. The court may cancel the contract completely or in the future. If the other party offers to compensate the damages, the contract may remain in force.

=== Void contracts ===
According to the concept of void contracts used by the Bulgarian lawmakers these contracts should be regarded as if they had never been concluded. The void contracts are those which have no legal effect because of their defectiveness from their conclusion and where a conformation is usually not possible. Contracts contravening or circumventing the law, as well as contracts infringing good morals, including contracts on inheritance that does not exist as yet, shall be null and void. Null and void shall also be those contracts that have an impossible subject, as well as the contracts which lack either consent or a form prescribed by law, or grounds. Fictitious contracts are also null and void. The grounds shall be presumed to exist until otherwise proved.

=== Partial invalidity ===
The invalidity of few clauses does not render the entire contract void given that the clauses may be replaced by binding prescriptions of the law or if the transaction is supposed to have been concluded even without the void clauses. If the contract is declared invalid, each party must pay back what he has received from the other party.

=== Reinterpretation ===
If an invalid contract complies with the requirements of another legal transaction, the former is valid and considered transformed in the latter given that the parties would have agreed to conclude the latter.

== Representation ==
The representation is governed by art. 36-43 OCA. The Representation is a legal institution referring to legal actions of one person (agent) on behalf of another (principal) whereby the principal has to bear the consequences resulting from the agent's legal actions. here are two forms of representation to be distinguished: voluntary representation – here, the representation is wanted and organized by the principal; and the second form is obligatory representation imposed by the law – in this case the law itself requires representation by certain persons.

=== Formation ===
- declaration of intent made by a private person:

- from the principal's unilateral declaration of intent (authorization), e.g. his last will- a contract.

- Formation of representation power by an enactment:

- If the representation power arises from an administrative act, e.g. if the administrative act is appointed by a guardian that hereby obtains actual authority - from a court decision - from a child's birth (parents obtain the actual authority for their child).

=== Preconditions for a successful representation ===
1. The agent must deliver an own declaration of intent. To guarantee the declaration of intent delivered by the agent, he must be capable of acting.
2. The agent must deliver the declaration of intent in the name of the principal. He must make obvious that he is acting in someone else's name.
3. The agent must have powers of representation and act within these powers. If the agent and the person he negotiates with reach an agreement to the detriment of the principal, the contract shall not be binding on the latter. If several persons have been authorized to exercise the same right to act, each of them may perform the act by himself unless something else is provided by the authorization.
4. In several cases, where strictly personal legal actions are required (marriages, wills etc.) agency is inadmissible as in these cases the legal actions are decided by the personal estimation of the person.

=== Termination ===
The representation is cancelled in the following cases:

- with the death of the agent or principal;
- with the dissolution of the legal entity;
- with the incapacitation of the agent or principal;
- with the withdrawal of the representation powers;
- with the adoption;
- regarding the guardianship over persons placed under disability: with the cancellation of the guardianship etc.

== Default ==
=== Debtor’s default ===
If for the performance of an obligation a time limit has been fixed, the debtor is in default when he is unable to meet the obligation within this time limit. If there is no date fixed for the performance, the debtor is in default after the creditor's request for performance. If the obligation arose due to a tort action, the default for the payment of the damages occurs without a request, from the date of the tort. If the debtor is in default, he must pay damages even if the performance becomes impossible for reasons for which he is not responsible unless he can prove that the creditor would have suffered the loss/damage also in case of a timely performance. The damages due to a default encompass the suffered damages as well as any lost profit, provided that the suffered damage is directly linked to the default and the profit could be expected under the contract. If the debtor did not act in good faith, he is liable for all direct and indirect damages.

=== Creditor’s default ===
According to Article 95 of the law of obligations and contracts, the creditor defaults if he does not accept the delivery/performance offered by the debtor or if he does not cooperate when this is required for the fulfillment of the obligation.

== Transfer of claim ==
=== Assignment ===
According to Article 99 of the Bulgarian law of obligations and contracts, a creditor may transfer his claims, provided that neither the law, a contract or the nature of the claim dictates otherwise. he transferred claim including the prerogatives, the remuneration and all other additions as well as the accrued interest passes on to the new creditor, unless something else is appointed. The old creditor must inform the debtor about the transfer of claim and hand over all present documents regarding the claim to the new creditor. Besides, the creditor must confirm the transfer in writing. The transfer is effective regarding third parties and the debtor from the day that the debtor gets informed by the old creditor. Regarding the transfer of claim for consideration, the old creditor is liable for the validity of the claim at the time of the transfer. The old creditor is only liable for the debtor's ability to pay if he pledged himself to and only to the amount that he obtained by transferring the claim.

=== Stepping in as co-debtor ===
With the approval of creditor and/or debtor, an obligation may also be joined by a third person as co- debtor. If the creditor agreed to the joining, it may not be cancelled or modified without his consent. The principal debtor and the co-person are jointly and severally liable toward the creditor. The debtor may be substituted by third parties only with the explicit consent of the creditor. The substituted debtor is relieved from the liability towards the creditor. The securities given by third parties expire if they do not agree on serving the new creditor. Pledges and mortgages that have been given to the first creditor remain effective. The new debtor may plead against the creditor any defenses of the former debtor arising from the transferred legal relationship.

== Unlawful Acts ==
The definition of the term unlawful acts can be derived from art. 45 OCA – if a person causes guiltily damage to another person, they must redress it. In all cases of tort guilt is presumed until proven otherwise. This provision applies to all natural persons. The legal entities are liable in accordance with art. 49 OCA as principal. The subject of the tort act must be a person with legal capacity to be held liable for tort action. That is why A person lacking the capacity to understand or control his actions shall not be liable for the damage he has caused while in such a state unless he himself has faultily caused his lack of capacity (47 OCA). The legal capacity shall be evaluated in each particular case – for majors as well as for minors. In cases of Self-Defense the liability is excluded. It is supposed that the tortfeasor's actions are not unlawful per se. However, in cases of stringent necessity, the created damage has to be repaired – even if the actions were not culpable, the result is unlawful. The OCA provides for several cases of liability in case of unlawful acts:

=== Responsibility of persons with legal duty to care for incapable persons ===
The person with legal duty to care for incapable persons (e.g. teachers) is liable for damage caused by the person unable to act, unless the occurrence of the damage could not have been prevented.

=== Responsibility of parents (art. 48 OCA) ===
Parents and adoptive parents that exercise parental rights are liable for the damage caused by their minor children living with them. The guardian is liable for damage caused by his ward living with him. The above-mentioned persons are not liable if they were unable to prevent the occurrence of the damage.

=== Responsibility of the principal ===
The principal is liable for the damage caused by his commissary while performing the imposed work. This legal provision is not applicable regarding contracts for work – there the person performing the work is personally liable. The principal may exercise his right on action for recourse/claim towards the commissary.

=== Responsibility for damage caused by items ===
The owner and supervisor of items are jointly and severally liable for damage caused by items of any kind. If the damage was caused by animals, the owner/supervisor is liable even if the animal ran away or got lost. Dangerousness per se or other specific characteristics of the item are not required. The owner and the supervisor are liable regardless of their personal fault; their behavior must not be unlawful or culpable. If they prove that the damage was caused by a force majeure, by actions of third parties or by the actions of the aggrieved party, they do not carry responsibility.

== Unjustified enrichment ==
A person is obliged to return whenever that person has obtained something without legal basis or if the legal basis did not occur or has ceased later on (art. 55). What has been performed regarding moral obligations may not be claimed back.

=== Return ===
If a specific item is to be returned the recipient owes its yields as well at the time of the request. If the item that is to be returned vanishes after the request or if the recipient affected the item or used it up, knowing that he owns it without legal basis or, if the revenues he obtained from the item were higher, he is obligated to pay compensation. If the item has vanished, has been affected or used up before the time of the request, the recipient only has to compensate what he availed excluding the yields. Where restitution is owed by a person of legal incapacity only what has been used to his benefit may be claimed from him. Excluding the cases named above, each person that obtained something from someone without legal basis must pay the enrichment until the state of impoverishment. This right is justified if no other claim to defend the impoverished person is present.

=== Repayment of another person’s obligation in accordance with art. 56 OCA ===
If a person pays another person's obligation by mistake, he has the right to claim it back from the creditor unless the latter one renounced the document or repayment of the obligation in good faith. In the latter case, the person that paid the obligation receives the creditor's rights.

== Offsetting ==
If two persons owe each other money or similar and replaceable goods, it is possible for them to offset/to balance their mutual outstanding debts with each other under condition of maturity and solvency of both debts. The counterparty must be notified about the offsetting. When making an offset of a claim no time limits or conditions may be imposed, except for the condition that the offsetting shall be taken into account only in case the claim is brought to court. The two reciprocal claims shall be considered as extinct to the amount of the lower one as of the day on which the offsetting could have been made. The offsetting is also possible after prescription of one of the claims, if it would have been admissible before the expiry of the limitation period. If the debtor agreed to an assignment of the debt, he may not offset his obligation with the assigned one regarding his old creditor. Claims that are not subject to forcible execution and claims ensuing from wilful wrongful acts and claims for taxes cannot be set-off without the creditor's consent.

== Reconsideration (art. 107 OCA) ==
If the debt is renewed with another one with the creditor's consent, the debt may be reconsidered. In these instances, the securities of the old debt remain in force if their providers have given their consent.

== Waiver ==
The claim may be waived if the creditor renounces his claim by a contract with the debtor.

== Limitation ==
The term „limitation“ describes a specific time period, after whose expiry the legal entity loses the right to assert and legally enforce his claims.

=== Limitation periods ===
The limitation period starts with the maturity of the claim. If agreed that the claim becomes due after request, the limitation period starts with the moment that the liability has been stated. Regarding tortious compensation claims, the limitation period starts from the point in time of acquiring knowledge of the offender. Regarding compensation claims on grounds of default, the limitation period starts with the day that the contractual penalty has been calculated. The general rules concerning the limitation are contained in the Bulgarian law of obligations and contracts but there exist special regulations providing shorter limitation periods and other regulations that differ from the general rules:

- 5-year limitation period – according to art. 110 after the expiry of 5 years, all claims without legally provided limitation period prescribe;
- 3-year limitation period - According to Article 111 of the law, the following claims prescribe after 3 years have passed:

(a) claims derived from an employment relationship, if there is no other limitation period provided; (b) damage compensation claims and contractual penalties in case of non-performance of a contract; (c) claims derived from tenancies, interests and other regular payments;

- 1-year limitation period - Regarding sales of immovable property with defects, the limitation period is one year as well;
- 6-month limitation period - A limitation period of 6 months is provided regarding claims for defects of movable property and other claims provided by the commercial law.

Agreements regarding a shortening or extension of fixed limitation periods as well as such regarding the renunciation of the limitation before it expired, are ineffective.

=== Suspension of the limitation period ===
The time between the occurrence of reasons for the suspension and their disappearance is not included, hence the remaining limitation period continues. The limitation period is suspended:

- between children and their parents whereby parents exercise their parental rights;
- between guardian and child for the duration of the guardianship;
- between spouses;
- regarding claims of persons whose assets are administrated by law or by an order of the court, against the administrator during the time of administration;
- regarding claims for damages of legal entities against their manager during the time of their appointment;
- regarding claims raised by minors or mentally immature persons for the time that they do not have a legal representative or guardian and 6 months starting from the time that a guardian has been appointed or the legal incapacity has been fixed;
- for the duration of a trial regarding the claim.

=== Interruption of the limitation period ===
If a limitation period has been interrupted, a new limitation period begins. If the claim has been defined by the court, the limitation period is always 5 years. The limitation is interrupted when the debtor's claim is approved; when an action has been brought to court or in case of an appeal against the conciliation procedure; if the action or the appeal has been dismissed, the limitation period is uninterrupted; when enforcement procedure has been started. What has been performed to fulfill a claim barred by the statute of limitation cannot be reclaimed even if it has been performed due to ignorance of the limitation.

== Joint several liability ==
Joint several liability exists when two or more parties are liable for one obligation. The creditor can demand the obligation in full amount from either party but he has only one cause of action. The persons who are liable for the obligation are called joint several debtors. The joint several liability is settled in art. 121 – 127 from the Obligations and Contracts Act (OCA). Joint liability can come into being:

- by law;
- from a contract (e.g. in case of a guarantee contract the guarantor undertakes an obligation before another's creditor to be liable for the performance of the other's obligation)

=== Effects of the joint several liability ===
The absolute effect means that one juristic act affects all joint several debtors in the same way. For example, the creditor can demand the obligation in full amount from either party. The performance from one several liability debtor affects also the others and the creditor cannot refuse it without being in default. In this case the creditor will be in default towards all joint several liability debtors. The autonomy of the different obligations undertaken by the joint several liability debtors is the reason for one juristic act that affects some of the obligations not have any effect on the others. This hypothesis is described by the term “relative effect of the joint several liability”. The obligations of the joint several debtors might have different due dates. As a rule the default of the debtor worsens his financial situation. That is why the default of one of the joint several liability debtors does not have any harmful consequences for the others. Another rule that can describe the relative effect of the joint several liability is that when the performance becomes impossible and only one of the debtors is responsible for that, the creditor may claim from the latter full damages. The limitation period also have a relative effect. If one of the joint several liability debtors to have performed in full amount to the creditor for him to have a regress claim against his co-debtors but only for him to have paid more than his share.

== Guarantee ==
The guarantee agreement obliges the guarantor to be personally responsible for the fulfillment of obligations/liabilities of the main debtor. The guarantee has to be confirmed in writing. Subject of the guarantee can be only existing obligations. It may be issued for parts of the debtor's obligation or under more favorable conditions. The guarantor and the main debtor are jointly liable. The guarantor remains obliged under the given guarantee if the creditor has claimed payment from the debtor within 6 months after the due date of payment.

== Pledge ==
In Bulgaria it is possible that for safeguarding a claim, a pledge is created on movable property or the claim itself. The right of pledge is an accessory right – it appears and disappears with the transfer of the safeguarded claim.

=== Pledge on movable property ===
The pledge agreement is only effective if the pledged object is handed over to the creditor. The only obligation of the creditor is to store the pledged object until the full repayment of the secured claim. He may not benefit from the pledge, unless there is an agreement for that.

=== Pledge on claims ===
Only claims that are able to be transferred may be pledged. The contract of pledge regarding a claim may not be set against third parties if the pledge has not been displayed towards the debtor. The pledger is obliged to hand over the documents verifying the pledged claims (if existing) to the pledge. The creditor is obliged to perform any necessary actions serving its maintenance, e.g. collecting the interest and also the principal sum.

== Mortgage ==
According to Article 149 of the Bulgarian Obligations and Contracts Act, a mortgage on real property may be established to secure a claim. According to Article 149 of the Bulgarian law of obligations and contracts, a mortgage on real property may be established to secure a claim.

=== Creation of the mortgage ===
The mortgage shall be created through registration in the Property Register on the grounds of a contract or by operation of law. It may be established only on separately specified properties and for a specific sum of money. A mortgage by operation of law:

1. in favour of the alienator of immovable property - on the alienated property as security for his claims under the contract, and
2. in favour of the co-partitioners to whom a supplementing of the share is due - on immovable property left in the share of a co-partitioner who is liable for the supplementing of the share.

The creation of a mortgage is invalid if either the mortgage contract or the application for creation of a mortgage by operation of law or the deed pursuant to which it is filed does not specify the identity of the creditor or the owner or the debtor, or does not specify the identity of the property or the secured claim or the amount of the sum the mortgage is created for. A creditor whose claim is secured by a mortgage is entitled to be satisfied preferentially from the mortgaged property's price, whoever its owner might be. The right to a preferential satisfaction also applies to the income from the property from the date on which the owner must give account of such income under forcible execution pursuant to the Code of Civil Procedure.

=== Deletion of the mortgage ===
The deletion of a mortgage is only possible with the creditor's consent – in a notarized form, or on the basis of an effective court ruling. The deletion shall be made upon an application with the deed of consent or a copy of the effective court ruling attached thereto. It shall be made through entering a note in the lot of the mortgaged property. The deletion extinguishes the mortgage.

== Purchase ==
With the conclusion of a purchase contract, the seller obligates himself to transfer property or rights to the purchaser; the purchaser obligates himself to pay the agreed amount of money. The expenses related to the contract and all costs related to the transfer of the property are to be borne by the purchaser, except the purchase of estates where the expenses are divided equally. The risk of accidental loss passes to the purchaser upon the moment that the parties agreed upon the goods resp. upon the moment of transfer.

=== Obligations of the seller ===
The seller is obliged to transfer the sold property/right to the purchaser. In the moment of the sale, the property must be transferred including its yields.

=== Sale of an object resp. an object for which third parties have rights ===
If third parties own property rights or other rights on the respective object which may be displayed towards the purchaser (who did not know about these rights), the seller is liable. If the sold object belongs completely to the ownership of a third party, the purchaser is entitled to dissolve the sale according to the regulations of Article 87 of the Bulgarian Obligations and Contracts Act.

=== The seller’s liability for defects ===
The seller is liable for defects in the sold object that substantially reduce the value or the suitability for its required use. The seller is also liable if the defect was unknown to him. Any agreements that exempt the seller from his liability are void.

=== The purchaser’s rights regarding the liability for defects ===
In cases that the seller is liable according to Article 139 of the law of obligations and contracts, the purchaser may return the object and demand the reimbursement of the price paid and of the expenses related to the sale. Regarding the non-performance of the obligations, he is entitled to a claim for compensation according to the general provisions.

=== The purchaser’s obligations ===
The purchaser is obliged to pay the agreed price and to receive the object. The payment is to be made in the moment and at the place that the object is transferred. If the sold object produces yields or other revenues, the purchaser owes interest on the price from the day of the transfer, even if the price is not due.

== Donation ==
The donation is a bilateral contract with the immediate and gratuitous assignment of an object performed by the giver in favour of the donee (who must accept the donation).

=== Types of contracts ===
There are 3 types of donation contracts to be distinguished:

1. indifferent donation – usual case,
2. donation by obligation – due to moral obligations,
3. donation by decency.

The significance of this division becomes apparent in respect of the donation's revocation: Donations made due to moral obligations or decency may not be revoked.

=== Formal requirements ===
According to Article 226 OCA, the promise of donation is not binding – consequently, pre-contracts regarding donations are void. Concerning the formal requirements, there are two types of donations to be distinguished: the formal donation and the donation issued by hand (resp. Article 225 (2) of the law of obligations and contracts). Regarding the donation of real estate, the validity requires a notarial certification; regarding the donation of mobility the form is eased: only the notarial certification of the signatures is required; regarding the donation of securities, the respective form of transfer must be maintained.

=== Revocation of donations ===
The revocation of donations due to ingratitude of the donee is provided in Article 227 OCA.

== Lease ==
With the conclusion of a rental/lease agreement according to Bulgarian law, the lessor obligates himself to provide a property to the lessee for temporary use, and the lessee undertakes to pay him a certain price. The rules regarding lease agreements are enshrined in the Obligations and Contracts Act, in Articles 228 to 239.

=== Lease of property ===
The lease agreement concerning property is an informal contractual agreement under OCA. It may have movable and immovable property as subject. Unless otherwise agreed, the lessor is bound to hand over the property in a state which is appropriate to the use it has been leased for and maintain this state for the duration of the contract.

=== Term of lease ===
According to Bulgarian law, the lease agreement may not be signed for a period longer than 10 years, unless it is a commercial transaction.

=== Maintenance and repair ===
The lessor is obligated to hand over the leased object in a state suitable for the contractually agreed use and to maintain this state during the lease time. Aside, he must repair of all damages if they are not faultily caused by the lessee and do not result from the normal usage.

=== End of the lease relationship ===
he lease agreement may be terminated on several grounds. The first group encompass the general civil law termination grounds: upon mutual consent of the contracting parties; termination due to a contractual breach by one of the parties; due to objective impossibility of performance, etc. Article 236 of OCA provides the expiration of the term as ground for the termination of timely limited rental relationships.

== Loan ==
With the conclusion of a loan contract according to Bulgarian law, the lender obliges to put a specific amount of money or replaceable goods at the borrower's disposal. The borrower obliges to return the amount of money or goods in the same kind, amount and quality. The loan contract is a unilateral gratuitous actual contract. The borrower must pay interest only if he obliged himself to this by a written agreement.

=== Effects of the contract ===
The borrower's primary obligation is to return the money/goods.

== Loan agreement ==
With the loan agreement, the lender obligates himself gratuitously to the borrower one chattel for temporary use and the borrower assumes the obligation to return it. The loan is an intuito personae agreement – the lender's personality is essential.

=== Contract Effects ===
The borrower must take due care of the chattel, giving higher priority to its preservation than to the preservation of his own belongings. Furthermore, he is obligated to use the object as contractually agreed and may not (unless something else has been agreed upon) hand it to third parties.

=== End of the contract ===
The loan agreement may be concluded for a specific period and is terminated with its expiration. Same applies accordingly if the contract has been concluded for a specific purpose. If the duration of the contract is not determined by a certain period of time or a specific purpose, the lender may claim the object back at any time.

== Contract for manufacture ==
With the conclusion of a contract for manufacture, the contractor obliges to perform a work at own risk; the customer obliges to pay the agreed remuneration. If not agreed otherwise, the contractor is obliged to perform the work on his own account. The contract for manufacture is always a legal relationship in return for payment.

=== Obligations and rights of the contractor ===
If not agreed otherwise, the contractor is obligated to perform the work on his own account. The contractor is obligated to perform the work in a way that it is suitable to its usual or contractually provided use. The contractor that performs the work using his own material is liable for its quality. The person ordering the work is entitled to check the performance of the contract at any time, provided he does not disturb the contractor.

=== Rights and obligations of the customer ===
The main obligations of the customer are to pay the contractor and to accept the work suitable to its contractually provided use.

=== Non-fulfillment ===
If it turns out that the contractor will not perform the work within the time limit or in the agreed or proper way, the customer is entitled to withdraw from the contract and to request damages according to the general rules. In cases of deviations from the agreed condition or defects of the work, the customer is entitled to:

- demand a gratuitous supplementary performance within an adequate period of time;
- demand the reimbursement of costs that arose with the rework or the reduction of the remuneration.

In cases of significant deviations from the agreed condition or defects that unfit the work for the usual usage or the contractually provided purpose, the customer is entitled to cancel the contract.

== Mandate contract ==
The commissioner assumes the obligation to perform on behalf of the client the acts for which he is commissioned by the client (art. 280). The mandate is a unilateral and, according to its definition, gratuitous contract. Though, it is possible payment to be agreed (resp. article 286 of OCA).

=== Rights and obligations of the parties ===
According to Article 281 of OCA, the commissioner shall perform the mandate with due diligence and shall protect the property received in connection therewith. The mandatary must provide an account to the mandator and deliver to him everything he has received in the performance of the mandate. Generally, no specific form is required – only if the order regards the acquisition of property rights on real estate, the contract must be concluded in written form and the signatures must be notary certified.

=== Termination of the mandate ===
Being related to the personality of the parties, the mandate is terminated with the decease or the legal incapacity of one of the parties or with the dissolution of the legal person of the client or commissioner. Other grounds for the termination of the mandate are the withdrawal of the mandate by the client, the rejection by the commissioner and the general termination grounds regulated under the law.
