= Leasor =

Leasor may be:

- an old spelling of lessor
- the surname of James Leasor
