= Ijarah =

Term of Fiqh in Islamic banking

Ijarah, (Arabic: الإجارة, al-Ijārah, "to give something on rent" or "providing services and goods temporarily for a wage" (a noun, not a verb)), is a term of fiqh (Islamic jurisprudence) and product in Islamic banking and finance. In traditional fiqh, it means a contract for the hiring of persons or renting/leasing of the services or the “usufruct” of a property, generally for a fixed period and price. In hiring, the employer is called musta’jir, while the employee is called ajir. Ijarah need not lead to purchase. In conventional leasing an "operating lease" does not end in a change of ownership, nor does the type of ijarah known as al-ijarah (tashghiliyah).

In Islamic finance, al Ijarah does lead to purchase (Ijara wa Iqtina, or "rent and acquisition") and usually refers to a leasing contract of property (such as land, plant, office automation, a motor vehicle), which is leased to a client for stream of rental and purchase payments, ending with a transfer of ownership to the lessee, and otherwise follows Islamic regulations.

== Rules ==
Islamic finance theorist Taqi Usmani lists seventeen "Basic Rules of Leasing" (leasing referring to Islamic leasing which Usmani uses interchangeably with ijarah) in his work Islamic Finance: Principles and Practice — although "the principles of ijarah are so numerous that a separate volume is required for their full discussion". Some of the rules include agreeing on the cost of the lease and the period of time for which it will last; clear terms in the contract; agreeing on purpose the lessee will use the property for, which they must stick to; the lessor (owner of the leased property) agreeing to bear all the "liabilities emerging from the ownership", etc. Usmani lists eleven "basic differences between the contemporary financial leasing" and "leasing allowed by the Shari‘ah".

Faleel Jamaldeen lists three features of ijarah that distinguish it from conventional leasing:

- The lessor must own the asset being leased for the entire period of the lease.
- No compound interest may be charged if the lessee delays or defaults on payment.
- Use of the asset being leased must be specified in the contract.

== Types of Ijarah ==
There are several types of ijarah:

=== Ijarah thumma al bai' (hire purchase) ===
In this transaction (hire purchase or Lease-Sale or Financial Lease) the customer leases (hires) a good and agrees to purchase it, paying in installments so that by the end of the lease it owns the good free and clear. This involves two contracts:

1. An Ijarah that outlines the terms for leasing or renting over a fixed period;
2. A Bai that triggers a sale to be completed by the end of the term of the Ijarah.

One Islamic Bank (Devon Bank) describes the process as follows

An ijarah transaction involves two components: a purchase agreement and a lease. You go out and find the property you would like us to purchase on your behalf. You negotiate the price and other aspects of the purchase. You make any initial payment of earnest money to reserve the property. You make sure that the purchase contract allows [the] Bank to step into the transaction as the buyer. The Bank then buys the property. At the closing, the Bank enters into an agreement to sell the property to you for a fixed price-the purchase price the Bank paid plus any transaction costs not paid by you at the closing. Ownership of the property is transferred to you after this price has been paid to the Bank. A payment schedule is established so that in exchange for keeping the property rented, your payments are deferred over time.

The buyer's installment payments will remain the same (or fairly close to the same) through the contract, but the portion of the payment going towards ownership of the property will increase to 100% over time as the portion going to pay rent/lease decreases to 0% — the decrease in rent/lease reflecting the decrease in the bank's equity of the property as the buyer's increases (much like the interest portion of a conventional mortgage payment declines to zero and the equity payment increases to 100% over time).

(This type of transaction is similar to the contractum trinius, a technique used by European bankers and merchants during the Middle Ages to comply with the letter of the Church's prohibition on interest bearing loans. In a contractum, two parties would enter into three (trinius) concurrent and interrelated legal contracts, the net effect being the paying of a fee for the use of money for the term of the loan. The use of concurrent interrelated contracts is also prohibited under Shariah Law.)

As of around 2013 there were 15 banks in Malaysia that offered this mode of finance (sometimes abbreviated as AITAB) for "individual and corporate customers".

=== Ijarah wa-iqtina (or al-ijarah muntahia bitamleek) ===
Ijarah wa-iqtina (literally, "lease and ownership") is also called al ijarah muntahia bitamleek ("lease that ends with ownership"). Like a ijara thumma bay`, it may involve both a lease contract and a sale contract. However, in an ijara wa iqtina contract the transfer of ownership occurs as soon as the lessee pays the purchase price of the asset — anytime during the leasing period.

Another source describes the difference between ijara muntahia bittamleek and ijara thumma bay` as that in ijara muntahia bittamleek sale/ownership transfer is "an option given to the lessee". In ijara thumma bay` sale is part of the contract.

An Islamically correct ijara wa iqtina contract "rests" on three conditions:

1. The lease and the transfer of ownership of the asset or the property should be recorded in separate documents.
2. The agreement to transfer of ownership should not be a pre-condition to the signing of the leasing contract.
3. The “promise” to transfer the ownership should be unilateral and should be binding only on the lessor.

Another source (investment-and-finance.net) describes Ijarah muntahia bittamleek as being though

1. hibah (gift), where legal title is transferred to the lessee without any more payments, and which according to investment-and-finance.net "is widely used by Islamic banks."
2. or through sales. Ijarah muntahia bittamleek through sales may be of three types:

a) where there is a gradual transfer of legal title of the leased property during the leasing "tenor" (period of time of the lease).
b) where the legal title is transferred at the end of lease tenor for "a token consideration".
c) where ownership is transferred before the end of the lease tenor for a price equivalent to the remaining ijarah installments (net of rental).

=== ijara mawsoofa bi al dhimma ===
In a "forward ijarah" or ijara mawsoofa bi al dhimma Islamic contract, (literally "lease described with responsibility", also transliterated ijara mawsufa bi al thimma), the service or benefit being leased is well-defined, but the particular unit providing that service or benefit is not identified. Thus, if a unit providing the service or benefit is destroyed, the contract is not void.

In contemporary Islamic finance, ijara mawsoofa bi al dhimma is the leasing of something (such as a home, office, or factory) not yet produced or constructed. This means the ijara mawsoofa bi al dhimma contract is combined with a Istisna contract for construction of whatever it is that will provide the service or benefit. The financer finances its making, while the party begins leasing the asset after "taking delivery" of it. While forward sales normally do not comply with sharia, it is allowed using ijarah provided rent/lease payment do not begin until after the customer takes delivery. Also required by sharia is that the asset be clearly specified, its rental rate be clearly set (although the rate may float based on the agreement of both parties).

== Challenges ==
According to M.T. Usmani, "some requirements of Shari‘ah are often overlooked" in transactions of ijarah in the real world, as when an unforeseeable circumstance leads to the destruction of the asset but the lessee is required to keep paying the rent in violation of the principle that the lessor assumes the liability for his ownership and offers any usufruct to the lessee.

Other challenges are not of failure to follow sharia law properly in practice but of disadvantages in cost or consumer protection ijarah has compared to conventional finance. Mahmud el-Gamal notes the added expense of the bank/financer having to "maintain substantial ownership of the property throughout the lease period" compared to financial leases used by conventional finance. Another problem is that the ijarah customer may be "exposed to the risk of losing the property if the financier is sued, loses, and declares bankruptcy" even if the customer has paid off 90% of the property price. A workaround (with additional cost) is to establish "bankruptcy-remote" Special-purpose entities to hold title to the property and "serve as parties to various agreements regarding obligations for repairs and insurance".

Abu Umar Faruq Ahmad writes in Theory and Practice of Modern Islamic Finance: The Case Analysis from Australia that at least in that country the lessee of Ijarah wa Iqtina house purchase is in a weaker legal position than the payer of a conventional mortgage. Firstly, the Ijarah wa Iqtina lessor/lender can evict the borrower/buyer who is "a few months in arrears" because the borrower is a tenant not an owner. In contrast the conventional borrower/buyer/mortgagor cannot because they have "security of tenure". Secondly if the Lender/mortgagee in a conventional mortgage does foreclose on the buyer and re-sell the property, they are "obliged by law to secure the best possible price" and to make available, "a full account" of the resale transactions to the foreclosed borrower. In a Ijarah wa Iqtina contract the lessor/lender has "no such obligation" to the lessee.

Muhammad Akram Khan criticizes ijara's customer protection vis-à-vis conventional interest-bearing loans in an example:

Suppose, for example, a person takes a five-year interest-bearing loan to buy a car. After two years, if he finds that keeping the car and the loan is uneconomical, he can sell the car in the market and repay the loan. This is not so in the case of ijara. Ijara finance cannot be terminated prematurely.
