= Drymiotis v Du Toit =

South African legal case

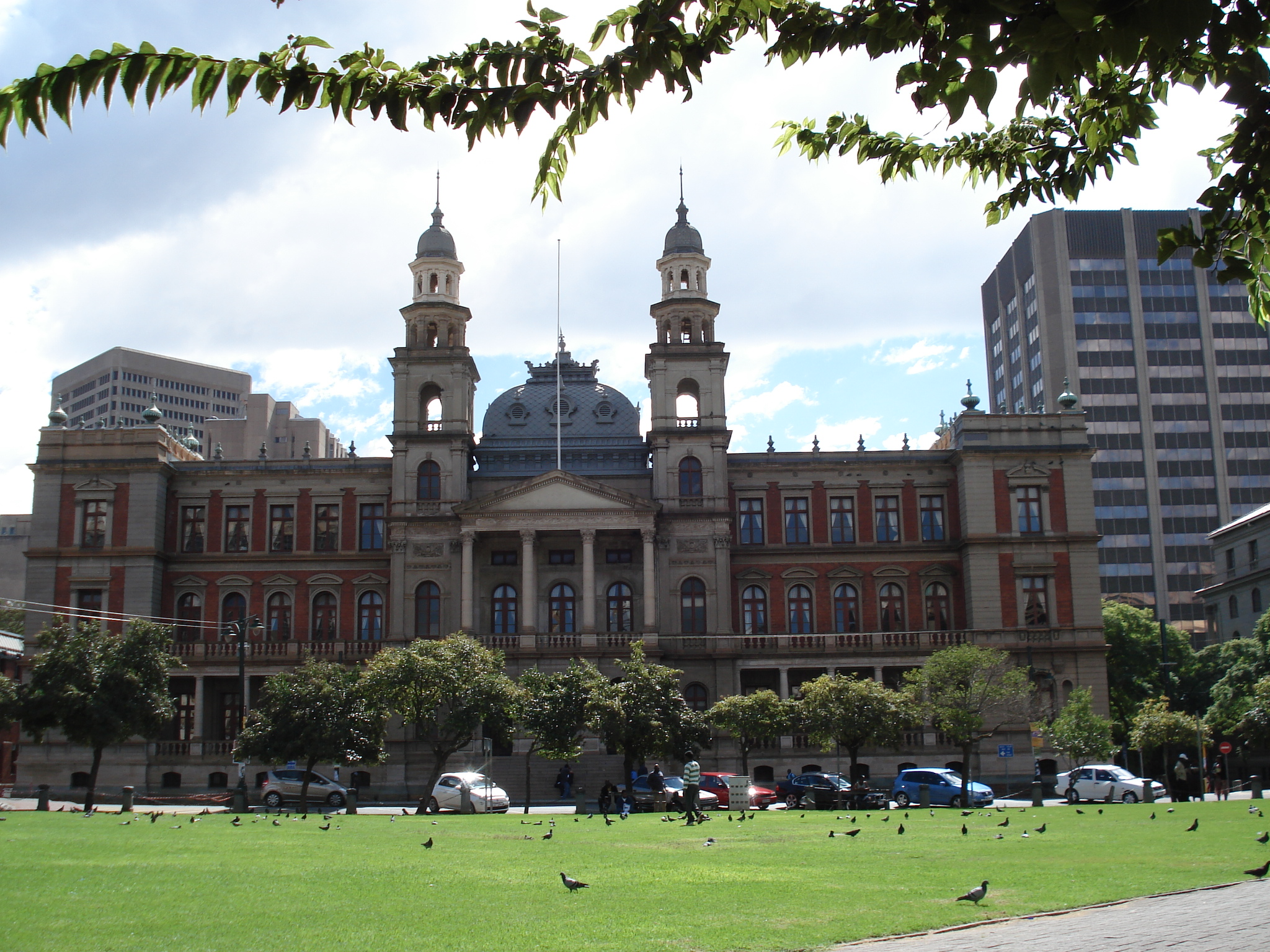
- Court: Transvaal Provincial Division
- Full case name: Drymiotis v Du Toit
- Decided: 3 January 1969
- Citation: 1969 (1) SA 631 (T)

Court membership
- Judge sitting: Marais J

Case opinions
- Decision by: Marais J

Keywords
- Mines, Minerals, Mineral lease

Drymiotis v Du Toit is an important case in the South African law of lease, heard on September 3, 1968. The applicant's attorneys were Schwartz & Goldblatt; the respondent's were Vermaas & Kie. HJ Preiss appeared for the applicant; JJ Strydom appeared for the respondent.

== Facts ==
A contract was entered into between Simon Drymiotis and Johannes Frederick du Toit to enable the latter, for a fixed period, to produce and deliver andalusite at the Pietersburg Railway Station in bags, from two farms, these being the property of Drymiotis. The contract provided as follows:

The andalusite produced will be priced at R20 per ton delivered in the truck at the station in bags, being production costs. It is further agreed that the purchasing company be approached to pay to the said producing contractor, the respondent, R20 per ton on his share of the andalusite and the balance to be paid to the owner of the mineral (the applicant). Provided that the sale price is R30 or more F.O.B. per ton, minimum to be R30 per ton.

== Argument ==
In an application for the ejectment of the respondent from the land, Drymiotis contended that the contract was void, as it had not been notarially executed in terms of section 3(1) of the General Law Amendment Act.

== Judgment ==
The court, after reserving judgment, held that the "contract" was essentially a "lease of rights to minerals in land" in terms of the section. Accordingly the contract was void for want of notarial attestation.

== See also ==
- South African law of lease
