= Lubbe v Volkskas =

South African legal case

Lubbe v Volkskas Bpk 1992 (3) SA 868 (A); [1992] 2 All SA 270 (A) is an important case in the South African law of lease. In October 1987, the appellant brought an urgent application before a single judge in which he applied for an order

1. declaring that he had established a lien over the wheat crop on a certain part of the farm T; and
2. instructing the deputy sheriff to sell the said farm subject to his lien.

It was common cause that the respondent's intention, as mortgagee, had been to sell the land subject to the lease and, if the property did not realise the amount of the judgment debt, then free of the lease.

Judgment had been obtained by the respondent against the owner in January 1986 on a mortgage bond registered over the farm in 1983, and the property had been attached in March 1986. In May 1987 the owner had entered into a partiarian lease agreement with the appellant, in terms of which the latter had obtained occupation of part of the farm, and upon which he had subsequently cultivated the wheat crop.

The appellant's application was dismissed, inter alia, on the ground that the appellant did not have a lien over the proceeds of the sale in execution. The sale in execution took place in October 1987.

The appellant bought the land himself in order to protect his rights. His appeal to the Full Bench was dismissed, whereupon he appealed to the Appellate Division.

The court held that it had been common cause at the time of appellant's original application that it had been the respondent's intention to sell the land first, subject to lease, and only if the amount of the judgment debt was not realised, free thereof, and that this was in complete accordance with the common law as well as with the established legal procedure in sales in execution.

Furthermore, the court held that, if the land was sold free of the partiarian lease agreement, the appellant's averred lien would lapse, and the holders of real rights of security in the land would become preferent creditors in respect of the proceeds of the sale.

It was only where the appellant, as lienholder elected to lay claim to part of the proceeds, and the deputy sheriff had to decide whether or not to allow it, that an application for a declaratory order as to the existence of the lien (as prayed for in prayer 1) became necessary.

The court held that it was clear that prayer (1) had been intended to serve as a precursor to prayer (2). The contents of prayer (2) were, however, contrary to the above- mentioned common-law principles and procedures applicable in sales in execution. Accordingly, the appeal had to be dismissed with costs.

== See also ==
- South African law of lease
