= South African law of lease =

Regulates contracts for leasing, letting and hiring

The South African law of lease is an area of the legal system in South Africa which describes the rules applicable to a contract of lease (or letting and hiring, Lat locatio conductio, Afrik huur en verhuring). This is broadly defined as a synallagmatic contract between two parties, the lessor and the lessee, in terms of which one, the lessor, binds himself to give the other, the lessee, the temporary use and enjoyment of a thing, in whole or in part, or of his services or those of another person; the lessee, meanwhile, binds himself to pay a sum of money as compensation, or rent, for that use and enjoyment. The law of lease is often discussed as a counterpart to the law of sale.

South African law, like its Roman counterpart, recognises three forms of the contract of lease:

1. locatio conductio rei, or renting or hire of a thing, movable or immovable;
2. locatio conductio operarum, or employment contract or hire of labour between an employer and an employee; and
3. locatio conductio operis, or contract for the supply of services, like the construction of a building, between an employer and independent contractor.

So much in their incidents do these differ, however, that they are best regarded as three different types of contract. This entry is concerned with the first of the three, or what is known in English law as, and commonly called in South Africa, the contract of landlord and tenant.

== Nature of the contract ==
In dealing with a contract of lease, one has to distinguish between a lease of movable property (motor vehicles and office equipment) and a lease of immovable property. The lease of movable property is subject to the provisions of the National Credit Act (NCA).

=== Definition ===
In terms of the NCA, a lease is an agreement in terms of which

- temporary possession of any movable property is delivered to or at the direction of the consumer, or the right to use any such property is granted to or at the direction of the consumer,
- payment for the possession or use of that property is
  - made on an agreed or determined periodic basis during the lifetime of the agreement; or
  - deferred in whole or in part for any period during the lifetime of the agreement;
- interest, fees or other charges are payable to the credit provider in respect of the agreement or the amount that has been deferred; and
- ownership of that property, at the end of the term of the agreement, either
  - passes to the consumer absolutely; or
  - passes to the consumer upon satisfaction of specific conditions set out in the agreement.

This definition has changed or departed from the common law, because in a contract of lease there has always been an expectation that, at the end of the terminal period, the goods will be returned in the same condition as they were received.

A contract of lease of a movable is treated in the same way as an instalment agreement. The NCA does not apply in respect of lease of immovable property; the common-law rules governing such contracts have been left intact.

Part C of the NCA, dealing with the various categories of credit agreements, excludes a lease of immovable property from these categories. This means that a credit agreement does not include a lease of immovable property. It also means that the definition of a contract of letting and hiring of immovable property remains the same.

Most sources describe the contract of lease as one whereby one party (the lessor) undertakes to grant to the other (the lessee) the temporary use and enjoyment of a thing in return for the latter's undertaking to pay rent. This definition differs from the one contained in the NCA. Some commentators on the Act have observed that it has in fact blended the lease of movables with a sale, and that this could create the problem of determining which naturalia of the contract will apply.

In terms section 8(4) of the NCA, if the agreement provides that ownership will always remain with the lessor, the agreement is not a lease for the purposes of the NCA. It will, however, be a credit transaction in terms of section 8(4)(f), and will therefore be subject to the NCA, provided that a fee, a charge or interest is payable.

A lease in terms of which the lessee pays rent which does not include a fee, charge or interest, and in terms of which ownership remains with the lessor throughout, will not be subject to the NCA. A contract in which a lessee hires property permanently is not a lease; it is another type of contract.

See the case of Mutual Construction Co v Komati Dam Joint Venture.

=== Bilateral juristic act ===
The contract of lease is a bilateral juristic act: It gives rise to rights and duties between the parties. There are several statutes applicable to the contract of lease. The parties must be mindful of the relevant statutory provisions when drafting the lease. The rights and duties afforded by legislation may not be waived. For example, section 5(3) of the Rental Housing Act (RHA) sets out certain rights and duties, while section 5(4) states that such provisions may not be waived by either party, as they are for the mutual benefit of both parties. The contract of lease will be deemed to include these provisions. Such provisions include the provision that, before the tenant takes occupation, there must be a joint inspection of the leased premises for defects and the right to privacy.

The contract of lease may be entered into orally, expressly or impliedly. One must bear in mind the provisions of the RHA, especially with regard to what constitutes a "dwelling," as this includes a shack. If the tenant requests that the contract be reduced to writing, the landlord has no choice in the matter and must comply.

The tenant has the right not to have the property searched and seized except in terms of a law of general application.

=== Synallagmatic contract ===
The tenant is still protected by the common law naturalia. The exceptio non adimpleti contractus, whereby a defendant may avoid his obligations to the plaintiff based on poor performance by the plaintiff, still applies.

See the case of Pete's Warehousing and Sales CC v Bowsink Investments and Ntshiqa v Andreas Supermarket.

=== Huur gaat voor koop ===
As noted above, in Roman law the contract of lease (locatio conductio) had three forms: the locatio conductio rei, the locatio conductio operis and the locatio conductio operarum. Roman-Dutch law adopted this position, and it is still in force in South Africa. The modern contract of lease is therefore the Roman locatio conductio rei, the rental or hire of a thing.

Contrary to Roman law, however, is that in South Africa prevails the Roman-Dutch doctrine of huur gaat voor koop (“lease trumps sale”). The lessee has under a lease only a personal right against the lessor, allowing him to demand possession of the leased property (res locata). Once the lessee takes possession of the res, he acquires a limited real right erga omnes in the res for the duration of the lease and will thereafter be protected by the maxim huur gaat voor koop. For long leases, every successor-in-title of the lessor is automatically bound by the lease, but for short leases, the successors are not bound until the transfer of the res has been registered, irrespective of whether they are aware of its existence. The lessee's protection under the rule is conditional on payment of the rent for the unexpired term of the lease to the new lessor. The rule applies only to material terms; it therefore covers the option to renew a lease but does not bind the new lessor in respect of an option to purchase.

=== Lease and other branches of the law ===
==== Law of property and lease ====
A lease is a property right which can either be ceded.

==== Contracts of sale and loan and lease ====
The NCA has blended the lease of movables with a sale. The rules of a contract of sale are sometimes applied in terms of a contract of lease, as where, for example, a third party fixes the sale or rental price. The rules of a contract of loan are also sometimes applied in terms of a contract of lease.

In NBS Boland Bank v One Berg River Driver and Others, the court held that, save, perhaps, where a party is given the power to fix his own prestation, or to fix a purchase price or rental, a stipulation conferring upon a contractual party the right to determine a prestation is unobjectionable. This does not mean that an exercise of such a contractual discretion is necessarily unassailable; it may be voidable at the instance of the other party. It is a rule of the common law that, unless a contractual discretionary power is clearly intended to be completely unfettered, an exercise of such a discretion must be made arbitrio bono viri. The discretionary powers vested in mortgagees in terms of mortgage bonds conferring upon the mortgagees the right unilaterally to increase the original rate of interest payable by the mortgagor must therefore be subject to the aforesaid inherent limitation. Such a provision in a mortgage bond is therefore valid.

In this case, in Van Heerden DCJ's obiter dictum, he noted that it is conceivable, albeit unlikely, that a stipulation may be so worded that an absolute discretion to fix a prestation is conferred on one of the parties. In these circumstances, it is unnecessary to express a view as to whether such a stipulation will be invalid as being in conflict with public policy, or whether the fixing of the prestation may only be assailed when it is done in bad faith.

See also the case of Benlou Properties v Vector Graphics.

=== Source of rules and proof of contract's existence ===
The main source of the rules pertaining to the contract of lease is the common law, as modified by the Constitution, and the rules creating statutory naturalia. Examples of such statutes are ESTA, PIE, Land Reform Labour Tenants Act, RHA and NCA. Note the case of Pete's Warehousing, noted above.

Regarding the common law in terms of competing leases, see the case of Croatia Meat v Millennium Properties. In these circumstances, it is noted that one must apply the rules of contract.

See also the cases of De Jager v Sisana, Schmidt v Dwyer and Southernport Developments v Transnet.

=== Essentials of the contract ===
A lease is formed by agreement between the parties that one of them is

1. to let or to give the other the use
2. of ascertained property
3. at a fixed or fixable rent.

==== Agreement on use and enjoyment ====
Undistrubed use and enjoyment of property is known by the Latin term commodus usus. According to Karin Lehmann, the word "use" encompasses both

- jus utendi, the right of using the property; and
- jus fruendi, the right to gather and enjoy the civil and natural fruits of the property.

The lessee does not, however, obtain jus abutendi: the right to take any of the substance of the leased property. Consequently, so-called mining leases, which allow the lessee to mine for and keep minerals, are not true leases. Nor is a contract allowing a person to cut timber on a farm, unless the trees are self-generating.

See Drymiotis v Du Toit and Business Aviation Corporation v Rand Airport Holdings.

Where premises are let for the purpose of conducting business, the commodus usus includes the fact that the lessor may not do anything which might impact negatively on the business. The lessee's right to commodus usus is one of the naturalia of a contract of lease. Where the profitability of the lessee's business has been reduced, the lessee's commodus usus has been impaired.

In Sishen Hotel v Suid-Afrikaanse Yster en Staal Industriële Korporasie, the Appellate Division extended the right to commodus usus by interpreting the lessee's right against the lessor to include a restraint upon the latter to refrain from direct or indirect conduct which negatively affects the profitability of the leased thing. Botha AJ thus introduced the principle of equality into the law of lease by protecting the interests of the lessee against both direct and indirect interference with the profitable use of the leased thing. The conclusion that the right to profitability is an ex lege term in all commercial leases appears to have been received with mixed feelings and remains under suspicion.

The extension was challenged in Sweets from Heaven v Ster Kinekor, where the question of the future profitability of leased premises arose when the lessor let property in the close vicinity of the lessee's premises to a business competitor of the first lessee. In Sishen, Botha JA had approached the question of whether or not a breach of the duty to provide commodus usus by the lessor constitutes a breach of contract as a question of the content of the lessor's common-law obligations to the lessee. Malan J, in Sweets from Heaven followed the approach submitted by Cooper: that the question of whether or not a lessor has committed a breach of contract can be decided only with reference to the terms of the contract. A tacit term is implied where the contract is silent on the point, but it is clear that the parties intended the term to be part of their agreement; they would not have contracted otherwise than on the basis of that term. In such a case, the common intention of the parties is inferred by the court from the express terms of the contract and the surrounding circumstances. It is not necessary that the parties should have consciously envisaged the situation; it is sufficient that their common intention was such that a reference to such a situation by the hypothetical bystander would have obtained a unanimous assertion of the implied term.

Conversely, a term implied by law is one that the law attaches to the particular class of contract in the absence of agreement to the contrary by the parties. These terms are the naturalia of the contract. The obligation to provide the lessee with commodus usus is one such term; therefore, where the parties do not explicitly include a term in the contract which excludes this obligation, it will be implied by law.

Ultimately, the lessor's obligation to provide the lessee with commodus usus is one of the naturalia of the contract of lease and, unless explicitly excluded in the contract, an ex lege term of all leases. It has not been disputed that profitability is included in commodus usus in commercial leases. Correct perusal of all contractual terms, argues Hawthorne, would have led Malan J to the same conclusion as Botha JA in the Sishen case.

It must be noted that it is essential that the leased property be identified or identifiable. Furthermore, the lessor need not be the owner of the premises; lack of title does not affect the validity of the contract. If the lessor fulfils the obligation to give the use and enjoyment which he has promised to give, the lessee is not entitled to question the lessor's lack of title and is bound to perform his own obligations. If the lessor does not fulfil his obligation and has no title to the property, specific performance will not be ordered; damages is the appropriate remedy.

Where the lessee already has the right to the use and enjoyment of the property to which the lease refers, there is no contract. Where, however, another has the right to the use and enjoyment of the property, the fact that the lessee is the owner does not invalidate the contract.

If the property once existed but, without the parties being aware of the fact, ceased to exist before the negotiations were concluded, there is no contract. If the lessor deceives the lessee into thinking that it exists when it does not, however, the lessee has an action for damages for any loss he suffers.

If a lessor bona fide represents that the property exists, when in fact it does not, the lessee has a claim for restitution and, if any loss has been suffered, damages for such loss.

==== Payment of rent ====
According to the common law, there is no contract of lease if there is no agreement on rent. Furthermore, the RHA requires rent to be agreed upon for the purposes of a rental agreement. The rent is usually a sum of money, in which case it must be either fixed in a definite sum or fixable by a method or standard, but may be in some other form, like a certain quantity, weight or measure of fruits or produce, or a certain proportion of the gross produce of the property. Whatever form the rent takes—and it cannot take the form of services—it must be definite or ascertainable. It may be agreed upon expressly or impliedly.

The parties may nominate a third party to fix the rent. (See the Southernport Development and NBS Boland cases mentioned above.) This is, however, subject to a proviso: The determination must not be dependent entirely on the unfettered will of one party. Furthermore, it is assumed that the party will use his discretion arbitrium boni viri: that is, according to the judgment of a good man. The discretion, therefore, must be exercised reasonably and equitably; the determination may be set aside if it is unjust.

In Proud Investments v Lanchem International, it was pointed out that it is essential in contracts of lease that the rent agreed upon by the parties be fixed in a definite amount (merces certa) or be determinable by a third person in accordance with the maxim certum est quod certum reddi potest.

===== Certain and ascertainable =====
Agreement by the parties on a certain amount of rent, orally or in writing, is the most common way in which the rent is determined in contracts of lease. Subject to there being sufficient evidence to allow conversion into a particular sum of money in the circumstances of the case, the following formulae are acceptable:

- "the amount paid by the previous lessee;" and
- the "usual" or "customary" amount.

If nothing is said, and there is a usual or customary amount, that amount will readily be implied.

"A fair and reasonable amount" may lead to particular difficulties. This question was raised but not decided in Genac Properties v NBC Administrators.

In Lobo Properties v Express Lift Co, the court held that the "fair and reasonable amount" formula was acceptable in appropriate circumstances. Note, however, that the actual decision on this aspect of the case was that the facts alleged did not justify an inference that the parties had agreed either upon any sum of money or any formula.

In cases where the parties expressly or impliedly agree upon a "reasonable amount" or a "fair and reasonable amount," the court must first consider what the parties meant when concluding the agreement and look to evidence in this regard, and then consider whether evidence is available to establish the amount in money in the circumstances of the case in question.

There are four main possibilities when it comes to what the parties thought was a "fair and reasonable" amount:

1. They may have had in mind the usual amount paid for that kind of property.
2. Each may have had a separate amount in mind but within the same financial bracket (if, for example, they thought that the rent would be between R4,000 and R5,000, and each party had a different figure).
3. The contract may lay down a test to allow the rent to be charged if circumstances change. The test must be one that can be described as objective. Alternatively, there could be a procedure agreed upon by the parties to vary the rental under a particular set of circumstances.
4. There may be no similar or usual fee, because the property is unique. The parties may have meant a sum of money which can only be determined when one party or an indefinite third party applies his mind to the matter.

Kerr states that it does not seem to be in accordance with the law to leave the decision to an arbitrium boni viri as that would mean leaving it to an indefinite third person. This Voet would not permit. Alternatively, if it were left to the court's discretion, this would not be in accordance with the law either, as it is not the duty of the court to make a contract between the parties.

See Totoyi v Ncuka.

===== Amount of rent =====
====== Economic rent ======
The parties may arrive at the rental value which the property commands in the economic circumstances of the time or which the parties consider to be fair in the circumstances.

====== Nominal rent ======
This occurs where the parties intend to establish the legal relationship of lessor and lessee, but where the lessor is content not to make a profit out of the transaction because he has an overriding religious, social or even economic objective in view.

Voet says that rent cannot take the form of ‘a single coin’ (= penny rent). This would imply that there is no lease, because it comes more to resemble a gift. The court must still consider the true nature of the transaction, however, as it is not legally impossible to have a lease with a nominal rent.

====== Commodities in which rent may be paid ======
The rent must be made in money or in quantities of the fruits of the property. Therefore, with regard to a lease of land for agricultural purposes, it is possible for the parties to agree that the rent is a percentage of the produce of the farm.

The question has arisen: Is a contract is one of lease if payment is made other than in money or fruits? Many authorities take the view that, by law, rent cannot consist in anything other than money or fruits, but this prevents the enquiry's being pressed to its proper conclusion. It must be regarded as incorrect.

In Roman law, the position was that, in an exchange, one cannot distinguish which party is buyer (lessee) and which the seller (lessor). This presents a problem, as their duties are very different.

The fundamental question, however, is not whether or not rent may be paid in something other than money or fruits, but rather this: Can rent be paid in something other than money?

In partiarian contracts, one of the reasons why payment in fruits does not affect the nature of the contract is that there can be no doubt about who is the lessor and who is the lessee, and no doubt, furthermore, about the residual obligations that each incurs.

See Rubin v Botha and Jordaan NO and Another v Verwey.

==== Period of lease ====
The duration of the lease is for such period of time as the parties have agreed upon, either expressly or impliedly. Leases fall into three main categories in this regard:

1. those entered into for a fixed period, short or long, or until the occurrence of a certain event;
2. those whose duration is at the will of either party; and
3. those which have no fixed terminal point.

This last category includes

- periodical leases, which continue from week to week, month to month, or year to year, until it is terminated by reasonable notice from either party; and
- leases in which the duration has to be determined by the residual rules

If the parties have not made any agreement about the duration of the lease, it is a periodic lease, the period being that in terms of which the rent is payable.

A lease at the will of one party cannot last longer than the lifetime of that party. If the relevant party dies during the course of a year, Pothier considers that the year must be completed. This is in the case of rural property and is based on the fact that the fruits are produced annually.

If the parties enter into a periodical lease, they may stipulate the length of the period. If only the period for payment of rent is stated, this is an indication of the intended period required for notice. The parties may agree otherwise, however.

If the parties leave the duration of the lease undefined,

- in the case of urban tenements, the law requires that reasonable notice be given; and,
- in the case of rural tenements, the unspecified period is understood to be a year, or the whole time necessary to enable the lessee to gather the fruits. The lessee must be allowed sufficient time to enable him to reap some real benefit from the transaction.

In appropriate circumstances, a lease may be ended before the date originally set, or extended beyond the original date. This is usually done by mutual consent.

New leases, whether express or implied, may also be entered into between the same parties. Pothier states that a lease entered into in perpetuity ‘passes over the bounds into another contract, namely emphyteusis’.

== Formalities and types ==
In the law of contract, the contract may be subject to formalities that are prescribed either by the parties themselves or by statute governing specific conduct.

No formalities are necessary for the validity of a lease as between lessor and lessee. The parties may agree, however, that the contract of lease is not binding until it has been reduced to writing and signed.

See Woods v Walters.

There is no vinculum iuris or binding tie between the parties until the formalities have been complied with.

If it is unclear whether or not the written contract alone is intended to constitute the agreement, any mention of a written document made between negotiations will be assumed to record or facilitate proof of an oral agreement.

No variation is allowed without including it in the written agreement.

See SA Bus and Taxi Association v Cape of Good Hope Bank.

In terms of formalities laid down by statute, one must distinguish between statutes which merely lay down penal provisions (like section 5(2) of the Rental Housing Act) and those statutes in respect of which non-compliance with formalities will render the contract invalid.

See Eastern Cape v Contract Props.

The legal position with regard to a lease not subject to the provisions of the NCA is that, as between the parties, there are no formalities required for the validity of the lease agreement, but formalities often will be necessary for effectiveness against third parties (like the landlord's creditors).

=== Movables ===
When dealing with leases of moveable property, one should note the formalities introduced by the NCA, particularly those relating to pre-agreement disclosures, delivery of the relevant documents free of charge, compliance with plain-language requirements, provisions relating to unlawful agreement and unlawful provisions in a contract, and the consumer's right of cooling off. Other important legal provisions are those governing the rescission and termination of credit agreements.

Section 121, dealing with the consumer's right to rescind credit agreements expressly, states that the section applies only in respect of a lease or instalment agreement entered into at any location other than the registered business premises of the credit provider.

In terms of section 121(2), a consumer may terminate a credit agreement within five business days after the date on which he signed the agreement, either by delivering notice in the prescribed manner to the credit provider, or by tendering the return of any money or goods; alternatively, he may pay in full for any services received by the consumer in respect of the agreement.

=== Registration of leases and subleases ===
Other aspects of the contract of lease that deserve special mention are those relating to the lease of land, in particular the requirements for the registration of leases and subleases. These are governed by sections 77 to 79 of the Deeds Registries Act (DRA).

In terms of section 77(1), save where provision to the contrary is made in any law, any lease or sublease of land or of any rights to minerals in land, and any cession of such a lease or sublease intended or required to be registered in the Deeds Registry, shall be executed by the lessor and the lessee, or by the lessee and the sub-lessee, or by the cedent and the cessionary, as the case may be, and shall be attested by a notary public—provided that any such lease shall be registered for the full term thereof.

Section 77(1)bis states that, whenever a cession of a lease is to be registered in respect of any port ion of the land leased, a notarial copy of the lease shall be attached to such cession and after registration such cession with the notarially certified copy of the lease annexed thereto shall be deemed to be the title to the portion of the lease so ceded, and for any subsequent registration in respect thereof it shall be part of the title.

The termination of a registered lease is regulated by section 78 of the DRA. It is important to note the steps to be taken by the registrar upon termination of a registered lease or sublease.

Registration has a bearing on cessions of such leases or subleases. In terms of section 80 of the DRA, no cession of a lease or sublease shall be registered in any deeds registry unless the lease or sublease has been registered therein.

In terms of section 81, no hypothecation of a lease or sublease shall be registered in any deeds registry unless such hypothecation is effected by means of

- a mortgage bond, if the lease or sublease is immovable property; or
- a notarial bond, if the lease or sublease is not immovable property.

Registration is a requirement of the law in respect of long leases. The much-criticised section 2 of the General Law Amendment Act (GLAA) was repealed by the Formalities in Respect of Leases of Land Act, which came into operation on 1 January 1970. The main provisions of the Act are contained in section 1, which provides that ‘no lease of land shall be invalid merely by reason of the fact that such lease is not in writing’. In terms of section 1(2), a long lease entered into after the commencement of the Act—that is, after January 1, 1970—shall not be valid against a creditor or a successor under onerous title of the lessor for a period longer than ten years after having been entered into, unless

- it has been registered against the title deed of the leased land; or
- the aforesaid creditor or successor at the time of the giving of credit or the entry into the transaction by which he obtained the leased land or a portion thereof, or obtained a real right in respect thereof, knew of the lease.

This section purports to remedy the defects inherent in the proviso to the old section 2, which reads as follows:

Provided that no lease of land which is entered into for a period of not less than ten years or for the natural life of the lessee or any other person mentioned in the lease, or which is renewable from time to time at the will of the lessee indefinitely or for periods which together with the first period of the lease amount in all to not less than ten years, and no cession of such lease, shall be valid as against third parties if executed after the commencement on this Act, unless registered against the title deeds of the leased land.

The general effect of the Formalities in Respect of Leases of Land Act is to reinstate substantially, if not completely, the alw as it existed prior to 1956, when the GLAA was enacted. In any event, the huur gaat voor koop doctrine is revitalized in so far as the previous legislation may have diminished its application to unregistered long leases. The overall result is that, apart from its validity inter partes, an unregistered long lease may be set up against all comers for the first ten-year period, but thereafter does not avail against creditors and onerous successors who had no knowledge of the lease.

One of the worst features of the GLAA was believed to be the obscurity of the phrase "third parties." If strictly construed, the proviso would abolish the well-established rule that registration is not necessary as against a successor who had notice of the long lease. A further difficulty was whether "third parties" included gratuitous successors. Again, on a strict interpretation, the question could have been answered in the affirmative. In Hitzeroth v Brooks, however, it was correctly decided that gratuitous successors were not "third parties."

The new section 1(2) clarifies the ambiguities of its predecessor: There is no mention of "third parties." It seems clear that, after the first ten-year period, the only persons against whom an unregistered long lease may not be invoked will be onerous successors (and creditors) without knowledge of the lease.

In view of the wording of section 1(2)(b) of the present Act, the tenant will only have to prove, after the initial ten year-period, that the landlord's successor—and he must be an onerous successor—"recognized and adopted" the lease in circumstances where he did not know of the unregistered lease at the time he entered into the transaction by which he obtained the leased land. Wille states that actual knowledge is required; it remains to be seen if constructive knowledge will suffice.

Registration requirements are also mentioned in section 25(2)(a) of the Mineral and Petroleum Resources Development Act, which provides for the registration of mining rights at the Mining Titles Office. In terms of section 11(4) of the Act, transfers, cessions, leases, subleases, alienations and mortgages, or variations thereof, must also be so registered.

In terms of section 11, prospecting and mining rights may be transferred, let and sublet. Such dealing may not occur, however, save with ministerial consent.

Draft regulations refer to sketch plans and diagrams that are required to be certified by a surveyor.

==== Formalities in Respect of Leases of Land Act ====
The much-criticised section 2 of the General Law Amendment Act was repealed by the Formalities in Respect of Leases of Land Act, which came into operation on 1 January 1970. The main provisions of the Act are contained in section 1, which provides that ‘no lease of land shall be invalid merely by reason of the fact that such lease is not in writing’. This is subject to the following qualification:

=== Rental Housing Act ===
The Rental Housing Act came into operation on August 1, 2000. Its purpose is to give effect to the right of every citizen to have access to adequate housing, by promoting investment in the rental housing market. The Act creates measures aimed at protecting both landlords and tenants.

In addition to repealing the Rent Control Act, as well as sections of the Sectional Titles Act, the Act also has an effect on the common law of lease, in that it creates statutory naturalia; it also limits the parties' contractual freedom.

The RHA governs only leases of dwellings for housing purposes, but extends to all urban and rural areas. The RHA provides that a lease between a tenant and a landlord need not be in writing or be subject to the provisions of the Formalities in Respect of Leases of Land Act, but a landlord must, if requested to do so by a tenant, reduce the lease to writing.

It is unusual to lay down that a contract need not be subject to the provisions of a specified statute. The question arises, therefore, of whether there are circumstances in which the provisions of the FRLL Act do not need to be applied. The answer is that this is possible when a lease is not in writing; if, however, the FRLL Act does not apply, cases must be decided as if this Act were not on the statute books. The law applicable, therefore, will be the non-statutory law before June 22, 1956.

Under the non-statutory law, the result would be the same as it would be if the provisions were applicable.

Under both, the lessee may claim registration against the title deeds only if the lease is in writing, and only if there is a title deed against which it can be registered.

As the RHA applies, inter alia, to huts and shacks, there will in practice be many instances of dwellings on land for which there is no title deed, but this is not the result of, nor is it influenced by, the applicability of the FRLL Act.

Furthermore, in the case of a long lease of properties for which there is a title, the parties (particularly the lessee) would be well advised to have the lease registered against the title deeds, and so bring themselves within the provisions of the FRLL Act.

It appears, then, that the legislature, in providing in section 5(1) of the RHA that a lease “need not […] be subject to the FRLL Act,” believed that those provisions imposed a burden of which the parties to leases of dwellings should be relieved. If so, as shown above, the legislature was under a misapprehension.

Section 5(6) of the RHA provides that a lease contemplated in terms of section 5(2) must include the following information:

- the names of the tenant and the landlord, and their addresses in South Africa, for purposes of formal communication;
- a description of the dwelling which is the subject of the lease;
- the amount of rental of the dwelling, and reasonable escalation, if any, to be paid in terms of the lease;
- the frequency of rental payments, if rentals are not paid on a monthly basis;
- the amount of the deposit, if any;
- the lease period or, if there no lease period is determined, the notice period requested for termination of the lease;
- obligations of the tenant and the landlord, which must not detract from the provisions of section 5(3) or the regulations relating to unfair practice; and
- the amount of the rental, and any other charges payable in addition to the rental in respect of the property.

Lastly, section 16 of the RHA makes it an offence to fail to comply with section 5(2), and provides a penalty of a fine or imprisonment. It is a crime, therefore, for the lessor to fail to reduce the lease to writing if the lessee asks for this to be done, or to fail to ensure that the information required by section 5(6), together with the list of defects and the copy of any House Rules there may be, are found in the lease and its annexures.

=== Categories of leases of immovable property and effectiveness against third parties ===
==== Long leases ====
A long lease (in longum tempus) must be notarially executed and registered against the title deed of the leased property. This is a lease for a period of not less than ten years, on which has been computed for the natural life of the lessee. This includes a lease which is renewable from time to time at the will of the lessee indefinitely. If it is not registered, it is not binding for a period in excess of ten years.

There are exceptions to this general rule in the case of:

1. creditors who have acknowledged its existence at the time of entering the transaction or giving credit; and
2. a successor-in-title for value with no knowledge of the lease, who will be bound by it if he subsequently adopted it.

In cases where there is a long lease, therefore, the lessee is protected from the time of registration.

The rules relating to the effectiveness of long leases against persons other than the parties differ according to the time of entry into the lease. Three periods have to be distinguished.

===== Before 22 June 1956 =====
The legal position during this period was summed up by O'Hagan J in Hitzeroth v Brooks. A long lease entered into before June 22, 1956, if it is to be binding on onerous successors and creditors of the lessor, must be registered against the title of the leased property, unless the successor has had notice of the lease. An unregistered long lease is always binding as between the immediate parties thereto, and upon gratuitous successors of the lessor, and is binding upon a purchaser who had no notice of the lease, for a period of not more than ten years, if the lessee was in occupation of the property when it was sold. In the Transvaal and the Orange Free State, however, it was provided by statute that no long lease should be of any force or effect against creditors or any subsequent bona fide purchaser of the property leased, unless it were registered against the title deeds of such property. Notarial execution was made an essential to the validity of such a lease inter partes. In Natal, it was prescribed that certain contracts, including a lease for a term of more than two years, had to be evidenced in writing in order to be enforceable.

===== 22 June 1956 to 31 December 1969 =====
Section 2 of the General Law Amendment Act, which began by laying down that no formalities were necessary for validity inter partes, contained a provision which read,

Provided that no lease of land which is entered into for a period of not less than 10 years or for the natural life of the lessee or any other person mentioned in the lease, or which is renewable from time to time at the will of the lessee indefinitely or for periods which together with the first period of the lease amount in all to not less than 10 years, and no cession of such lease, shall be valid against third parties if executed after the commencement of this Act (22 June 1956) unless registered against the title deeds of the leased land.

The provision suffered from considerable absurdity on the point of who the third parties were.

The case of Hitzeroth establishes that a wife married in community of property, and subject to the marital power, being bound by a lease executed by her husband, is not, either during the subsistence of the marriage or after her husband's death, a "third party" as contemplated.

Furthermore, one cannot merely say that "third parties" were all persons other than the original parties.

The question which presented the greatest difficulty was the position of persons other than "third parties" who, before 1956, were bound by unregistered long leases:

- gratuitous successors;
- onerous successors who knew of the lease; and
- onerous successors without knowledge of the lease who were bound for not more than ten years if the lessee was in occupation.

The difficulty is one of interpretation: What did the legislature intend when it enacted the provision? The answer is suggested to be found by following the approach adopted by the Appellate Division "for the sure and true interpretation of all statutes in general." This is to consider the following questions:

- What was the law before the Act?
- What was the mischief and effect for which the law did not provide?
- What did remedy the Parliament resolve and appoint to cure the disease of the commonwealth?
- What was the true reason of the remedy?

The office of all the judges is always to make such construction as shall suppress the mischief and advance the remedy.

The law "before the Act" is the law before June 22, 1956.

The term "mischief" applied to two matters:

1. There was some doubt about whether writing was necessary for validity inter partes.
2. There was a lack of uniformity in the law of the different provinces.

The remedy in respect of validity inter partes was to lay down that writing was not necessary. This involved the repeal of the sections in the statutory law of the Transvaal, Orange Free State and Natal, which required writing for validity inter partes.

Nothing further need have been done, as the removal of the repealed sections resulted in the fact that the common law would have been in force in all provinces and uniformity would have been achieved.

Parliament included in the GLAA, however, the proviso on registration quoted above.

Where, therefore, long leases entered into during the period under discussion are concerned, gratuitous successors are bound to recognise an unregistered lease; so are onerous successors who know of its existence. Onerous successors without knowledge are bound for the first ten years of the lease if the lessee is in occupation.

In addition, a successor is bound if he recognises and adopts the lessee as a lessee under a lease.

===== On or after 1 January 1970 =====
Section 1(2) of the Formalities in Respect of Leases of Land Act (in force from January 1, 1970) provides that

no lease of land which is entered into for a period of not less than ten years or for the natural life of the lessee or any other person mentioned in the lease, or which is renewable from time to time at the will of the lessee indefinitely or for periods which together with the first period of the lease amount in all to not less than ten years, shall, if such lease be entered into after the commencement of this Act, be valid against a creditor or successor under onerous title of the lessor for a period longer than ten years after having been entered into unless—

(a) it has been registered against the title deeds of the leased land; or

(b) the aforesaid creditor or successor at the time of the giving of credit or the entry into the transaction by which he obtained the leased land or a portion thereof or obtained a real right in respect thereof , as the case may be, knew of the lease.

The form of the subsection does not call for any mention of gratuitous successors, but the express mention of a successor "under onerous title" shows that the legislature adopts the distinction between gratuitous and onerous successors in preference to that between universal and particular ones.

Further, the difficulties introduced into the law by the enactment of the proviso to section 2 of the GLAA were repealed; the law returned to the common-law position. It is clear, therefore, that a gratuitous successor is bound by an unregistered long lease even though he did not know of its existence.

Furthermore, there is no mention of the fact that, if the lessee is in occupation at the time of the sale, onerous successors are bound for the first ten years of the currency of the unregistered long lease, even though they did not know of its existence. On the principles and authorities mentioned, they are bound for the period mentioned.

An onerous successor is bound for the whole period of a long lease if it is registered, whether or not he knew of its existence.

In addition, an onerous successor is bound for the whole period of the long lease if he "knew" of the existence of the lease at the time of the entry into the transaction by which he obtained the leased land. In this regard, mere knowledge is insufficient, because occupation could be evidence of a short lease. There must be knowledge that there was a long lease. The onus of proving the requisite knowledge is on the lessee.

With regard to the time period when the onerous successor has knowledge, the expression "at the time of entry into the transaction" leads one to think that Parliament meant "at the time of sale," because one commonly refers to sale, but not to registration, as a transaction. In particular, one does not normally speak of "entering into" registration.

The continuation of the phrase by the words "by which he obtained the leased land" leads one to think that Parliament meant "at the time of registration," because one obtains land on registration and not on sale.

In light of these obscurities, the purpose of the Act as a whole is to return to the common law. Unfortunately the common-law position is not clear.

There are indications that the courts tend to prefer the date of sale, but such statements have been subjected to strong criticism.

For the sake of completeness, note that a lessee of land which is owned by the lessor is entitled to have a long lease registered, and can compel the lessor to render whatever assistance is necessary to obtain registration.

If ownership of the land leased does not vest in the lessor, the owner's consent must be obtained before the lease can be registered against title.

In South Africa, differing in this respect from Zimbabwe, the consent of a mortgagee is not necessary.

==== Short leases ====
Short leases, whether oral or in writing, are effective against all others if the lessee or another holding under or through him is in occupation. Short leases are leases for a period shorter than ten years.

Two approaches are possible if neither the lessee nor anyone else holding under him is in occupation:

1. A distinction is drawn between gratuitous and onerous successors. The rule is that, if neither the lessee nor anyone else holding under or through him is in occupation, a short lease is effective against the lessor's gratuitous successors, and also against purchasers who knew of its existence, but not against creditors of the lessor or purchasers who did not know of its existence.
2. Alternatively, a distinction is drawn between universal and particular successors.

It is unclear how helpful the second distinction is. A universal successor is bound by all his predecessors' obligations, but there are no universal successors nowadays other than black South Africans on whom an estate devolves under customary law.

Among those who are bound to recognise and continue the lease, now that the Roman-Dutch Law principle that lease takes precedence over sale (huur gaat voor koop) has been adopted, Van Leeuwen mentions purchasers and donees, while Voet lists "usufructuaries, legatees, donees and the like successors on particular title," and says that their position is in no way distinguished from that of purchasers.

This position is accepted by proponents of the universal-or-particular-successors distinction, as it has been agreed that the doctrine applies not only to purchasers of leased property, but also to gratuitous successors in title of the original lessor.

Therefore, the lessee in occupation acquires a limited real right for the duration of the lease. Every successor in title will be bound by the lease.

On both approaches, even if neither the lessee nor anyone else holding under or through him is in occupation, a short lease is effective against heirs, legatees, donees and other gratuitous particular successors.

Purchasers are particular successors. If the universal or particular distinction is adopted, they should not be bound, but they are bound on the huur gaat voor koop principle.

On the first approach, purchasers who did not know of the existence of the lease are not bound if neither the lessee nor anyone else holding under or through him is in occupation.

Occupation is an outward sign to prospective purchasers that there is a lease. If the lessee does not take up occupation when he has an opportunity to do so, he has himself to blame if a purchaser is persuaded to pay the price appropriate for the property which he (the purchaser) thinks he will be able to occupy.

Creditors of the lessor are in a separate class. Voet says that, in the case of long leases, their rights are preserved. This is the position in relation to long leases today.

There seems to be no decision concerning their position if the lease is a short one.

Professor Wille considered that creditors' rights took preference over those of a lessee who was not in occupation, but the point was left open in Kessoopersadh v Essop. See also Genna-Wae Properties v Medico-Tronics.

==== Unregistered long leases ====
In respect of unregistered long leases, the huur gaat voor koop rule applies for the first ten years of its existence.

The lessee must be in occupation of the leased property.

An unregistered long lease is enforceable against the new owner of the property on the basis of the doctrine of prior knowledge: that is to say, if he has prior knowledge of the lease.

This is to ensure that people do not take advantage of the law to eject lessees.

See De Jager v Sisana and Schwedhelm v Hauman.

=== Alternative common-law land-use rights ===
==== Partiarian lease ====
The partiarian lease is said to be a special kind of land lease, which applies to the use of agricultural land where the owner and the lessee agree that the lessee shall farm the land against payment in the form of a certain percentage of the crop or produce.

See Lubbe v Volkskas.

==== Labour tenants ====
This situation in respect of labour tenants is governed by the Land Reform (Labour Tenants) Act, but a person may only rely on the protection of the Act if he complies with the requirements of section 1.

See Department of Land Affairs and Others v Goedgelegen Tropical Fruits and Brown v Mbhense and Another.

== See also ==
- South African law of sale
