= Hitzeroth v Brooks =

South African legal case

- Court: South African court
- Full case name: Hitzeroth v Brooks

Court membership
- Judges sitting: O'Hagan J, Munnik J

Keywords
- lease, renewal, cession

Hitzeroth v Brooks is an important case in the South African law of lease, in which Hitzeroth instituted action for the ejectment of Brooks from certain property. Her cause of action was founded upon an undisputed allegation that she was the owner of the property and Brooks was in unlawful occupation thereof.

Brooks alleged that she was the cessionary of a lease which had been entered into between Hitzeroth's late husband as lessor and one Mrs Rodkey as lessee for a period of nine years and eleven months. This lease gave the lessee the right to renew the lease for a further period subject to the same terms and conditions. Furthermore, the lessee had the right either to sublet or to cede her rights to any other period for the unexpired portion of the lease or renewal thereof.

Mrs Rodkey had ceded her rights to Brooks.

When Brooks gave Hitzeroth written notice of her intention to renew the lease, Hitzeroth challenged the validity of the renewal and subsequently brought this action.

O'Hagan J held that the words "third parties" in section 2 of the General Law Amendment Act of 1956 should be so construed as to exclude from the operation of the proviso persons falling within the class comprising gratuitous successors to the lessor: that is, persons who, under the previous statute and the common law, were bound by a long lease whether or not they had notice, actual or constructive, of the existence of the lease.

Munnik J held that the words "third parties" in the section refer to those who are not parties to the lease or cession, but persons other than the original contracting parties can become parties to it, in which case they are not "third parties" within the meaning of the section.

== See also ==
- South African law of lease
