= Mutual Construction Co v Komati Dam Joint Venture =

South African legal case

In Mutual Construction Co v Komati Dam Joint Venture, an important case in South African law, Mutual Construction leased a truck, together with an operator, to Komati Dam Joint Venture (KDJV). The agreement required KDJV to provide responsible supervision for the operator; it also provided that KDJV would be responsible for loss or damage to the truck occurring through KDJV's negligence, misdirection or misuse.

While operating the truck onsite, under the control of KDJV, the operator fell asleep and had an accident. Mutual Construction sued KDJV for the cost of repairing the truck and for loss of income due to the truck's being unusable until repaired.

The High Court held that KDJV was not liable, as it had offered the operator an opportunity to rest, of which he had failed to take advantage. It was held, therefore, that the operator's negligence was beyond the control of KDJV.

On appeal, the Supreme Court of Appeal restated common-law rule that a lessee must restore leased property in the condition in which it was received, fair wear and tear excluded. All Mutual Construction had to prove, therefore, was that the article was in a damaged state when returned; it would then be for the hirer of the article, KDJV, to show that damage to the article was due to no negligence on its part. Accordingly, KDJV was found to be liable to Mutual Construction.

== See also ==
- South African law of lease
