= De Jager v Sisana =

South African legal case

De Jager v Sisana 1930 AD 71 is a South African appellate court case from 1930. It is an important case in the South African law of lease.

== Decision ==
A squatter called Sisana lived on a farm by arrangement with the owner, providing labour in return for occupation. The owner sold the land to de Jager, who was willing to keep the agreement going, but Sisana refused to work for the new owner and also refused to leave the land. The South African appellate court held that de Jager was entitled to evict Sisana since Sisana had lost tenancy rights by refusing to work for the new owner.

== Significance ==
De Jager v Sisana is an important case in the South African law of lease. The case established that rent is only payable in money or fruits of the property.
