= Woods v Walters =

South African legal case

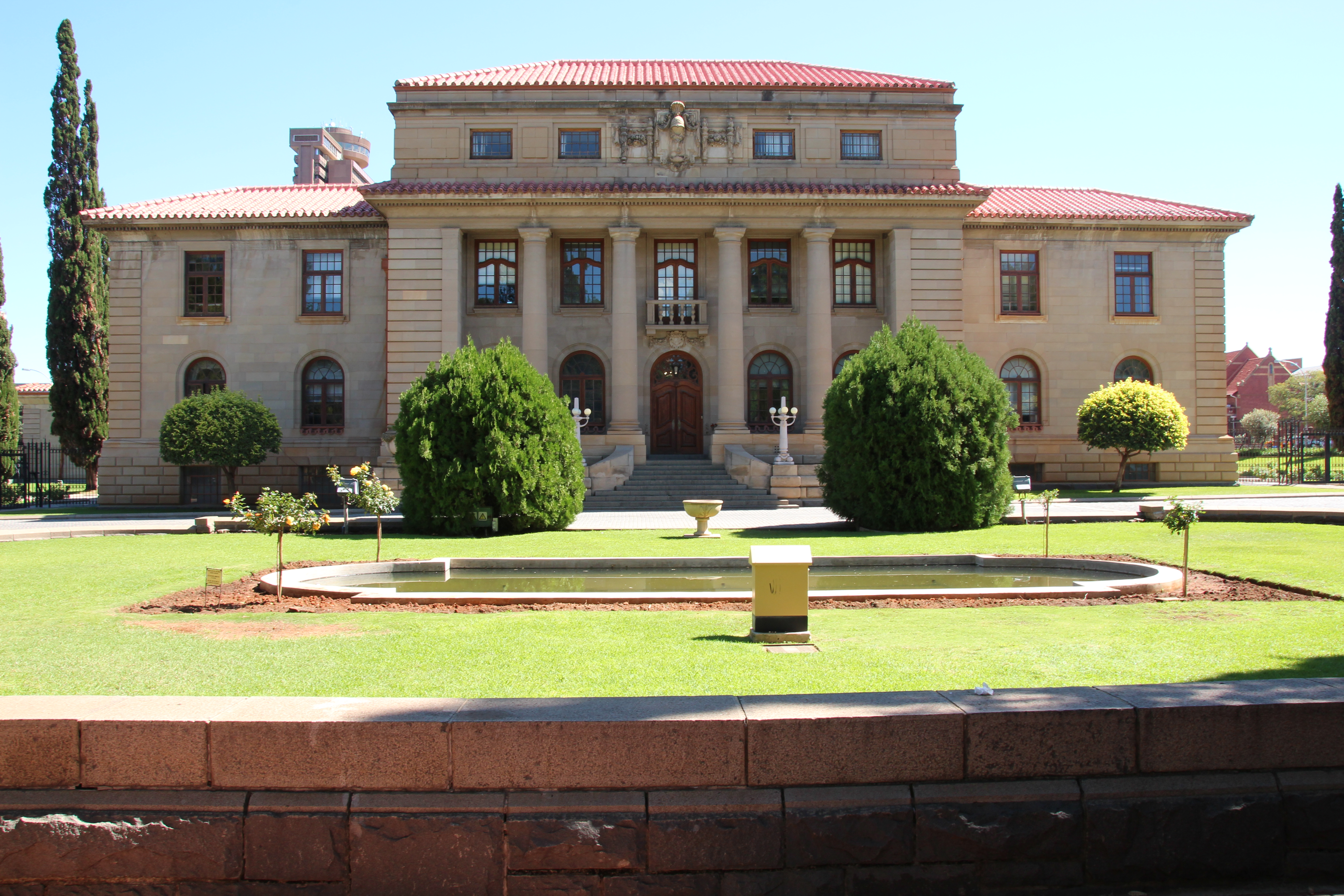
- Court: Appellate Division
- Full case name: Woods v Walters
- Citation: 1921 AD 303

Woods v Walters, an important case in the South African law of lease, was an action to enforce the execution and performance of a contract for the lease by the defendant to the plaintiff of a certain land with a furnished house and other buildings thereon.

Where the parties are shown to have been ad idem as to the material conditions of a contract, the onus of proving an agreement that legal validity shall be postponed until the due execution of a written document lies upon the party who alleges it. Damages claimed as an alternative to a decree of specific performance of a contract must be proved and ascertained in the ordinary way; they should not be assessed by the court as a punishment for contumacity.

On the evidence, the parties had reached a binding agreement. The court held, however, that there was no agreement that they should not be bound until a written lease had been executed. Accordingly, the court held that the plaintiff was entitled to an order for specific performance or, in the alternative, damages.

== See also ==
South African law of lease
