= Sishen Hotel v Suid-Afrikaanse Yster en Staal Industriële Korporasie =

South African legal case

In Sishen Hotel (Edms) Bpk v Suid-Afrikaanse Yster en Staal Industriële Korporasie Bpk, an important case in the South African law of lease, the parties had concluded a twenty-year lease for a hotel. The lodge was next to a national road; because of this, it attracted considerable business.

Eight years after the conclusion of the contract, the lessor insisted on the diversion of a national road. This impacted negatively on the flow of business to the hotel. About three years later, it was closed down.

The lessee instituted an action against the respondent for the payment of damages for breach of contract. This claim was dismissed by the court a quo.

On appeal, the plaintiff averred that there was an implied term in the agreement that the respondent would not take any steps which would have the effect of interfering with access to the hotel and thus prevent the flow of business.

Botha, JA held that the common-law duties of the lessor had to be determined first. He concluded that commodus usus could include the idea of profit where the lessee runs a business from the leased premises. If the property has been leased for the purpose of conducting business from it, the lessee's right to commodus usus also relates to the profit to be gained from conducting the business. The commodus usus of lessees conducting business on the property let, including its profitability, may be infringed in both a direct and an indirect manner.

Cooper has questioned the conclusion of Botha, JA in the Sishen case, arguing that the liability of the lessor is not absolute, and that therefore, for a successful claim based on reduced profitability, the lessee must prove that the parties expressly or tacitly agreed that they would refrain from such conduct.

With reference to Pothier, he states that "the only ground on which the lessee in Sishen was entitled to recover damages from the lessor was if he could prove that the lessor was contractually bound to refrain from conduct which caused loss."

Cooper concludes that, on the facts, the lessee had proven that a tacit term existed and was breached; therefore the order was correct. The difference is that Botha JA saw the commodus usus as part of the common-law naturalia, whereas Cooper believes that the lessee must plead that such a term existed in the contract.

== See also ==
- South African law of lease
