= Kessoopersadh v Essop =

South African legal case

In Kessoopersadh v Essop (1970) is an important case in the South African law of lease.

The relationship between the lessee and the purchaser, who are bound by the rule huur gaat voor koop, is such that such purchaser cannot be regarded as a third party as contemplated by section 2 of the General Law Amendment Act of 1956.

The scope of the rule 'huur gaat voor koop' and the proviso to section 2 of Act 50 of 1956 fully discussed. The decision in the Natal Provincial Division in Kessoopersadh and Another v Essop and Another, reversed.

== See also ==
- South African law of lease
