= Eastern Cape v Contract Props =

South African law of lease case

Eastern Cape v Contract Props, is an important case in the South African law of lease, where Eastern Cape entered into a contract of lease with the respondent, without complying with or without making use of procedures prescribed by the Provincial Tender Board Act.

Section 4(1) of the Provincial Tender Board Act provides, among other things, that the tender board established in terms of the Act

shall have the sole power to procure supplies and services for the province, and, subject to the provisions of any other Act of the provincial legislature, to arrange the hiring or letting of anything or the acquisition or granting of any right for or on behalf of the province, and to dispose of movable provincial property, and may for that purpose—(a) on behalf of the province conclude an agreement, which shall be in writing, with a person within or outside the Republic for the furnishing of supplies and services to the province or for the hiring or letting of anything or the acquisition or granting of any right for or on behalf of the province or for the disposal of movable provincial property; (b) with a view to concluding an agreement referred to in para (a), in any manner it may deem fit, invite offers and determine the manner in which and the conditions subject to which such offers shall be made.

These and other provisions of the Act, the court noted, show how important a role the tender board is intended to play in ensuring good governance in the field of procurement policies and procedures, and the priority accorded to fair dealing and equitable relationships among parties to provincial contracts. It was difficult to see any room for the co-existence of a power residing in other entities or persons within the provincial administration to do, without any reference whatsoever to the tender board, that which section 4(1) (a) and (b) empowers the tender board to do. That the tender board "acts on behalf of the province" in arranging to hire premises, or in concluding a lease, could not derogate from the fact that section 4(1) disables the province from acting autonomously in this regard.

The mischief which the Act seeks to prevent was plain enough to the court: It is to eliminate patronage or worse in the awarding of contracts, to provide members of the public with opportunities to tender to fulfil provincial needs, and to ensure the fair, impartial and independent exercise of the power to award provincial contracts.

If contracts were permitted to be concluded without any reference to the tender board, and without any resultant sanction of invalidity, the very mischief which the Act seeks to combat could be perpetuated. Accordingly, the court held that leases entered into by a department of the provincial government (as lessee) without the tender board's having arranged the hiring of the premises in terms of section 4(1) of the Act, are invalid.

== Sources ==
- Eastern Cape and Others v Contractprops 25 (Pty) Ltd 2001 (4) SA 142 (A); [2001] 4 All SA 273 (A).
- A W G Raath, "Publiekregtelike estoppel, bilikheid en die ontwikkeling van die gemenereg: 'n vonnisbespreking van Eastern Cape Provincial Government v Contractprops 25 (Pty) Ltd en Eastern Metropolitan Substructure v Peter Klein Investments (Pty) Ltd: chronicle" (2005) 30(2) Tydskrif vir Regswetenskap (Journal for Juridical Science) 133 University of the Free State.
- J R De Ville. Judicial Review of Administrative Action in South Africa. LexisNexis Butterworths. 2005. Pages 45 and 137.
- Cora Hoexter. Iain Currie (ed). The New Constitutional and Administrative Law. Juta. 2001. Volume 2. Page 22.
- Graham Glover (ed). Essays in Honour of AJ Kerr. LexisNexis Butterworths. 2006. Page 171.
- Annual Survey of South African Law 2005, p 252.
- Pieter Andrè Botha and Nicolene Schoeman-Louw, "Government contracts: When to rely on estoppel", De Rebus, 1 August 2020, p 19
- Daniel Malan Pretorius, "The Defence of the Realm: Contract and Natural Justice" (2002) 119 South African Law Journal 374 at 384
- Charlotte Hinga, "Observations on the Impact of the 2008 Companies Act on the Doctrine of Constructive Notice" (2013) 130 South African Law Journal 464 at 474
- K A Templeton (2002) 5(1) The Judicial Officer 20
- "The bitter taste left by non-compliance with procurement legal prescripts", Polity, 19 June 2013
