= Southernport Developments v Transnet =

South African legal case

In Southernport Developments (Pty) Ltd (Previously Known as Tsogo Sun Ebhayi (Pty) Ltd) v Transnet Ltd, an important case in the South African law of lease, Transnet excepted to Southernport Developments' particulars of claim on the ground that it disclosed no cause of action. The particulars of claim required Transnet to enter into good-faith negotiations with Southernport regarding the terms and conditions of an agreement of lease in respect of the properties described. The basis of Southernport's claims was contained in a contract which provided for the option to lease properties on terms and conditions to be negotiated, and provided for the referral of disputes to an arbitrator. The particulars of claim further alleged that any dispute between the parties had in terms of the contract to be referred to an arbitrator.

Transnet claimed that the relevant clauses were unenforceable,

- because there had been no agreement regarding the essential terms of any lease;
- because the terms of the agreement relating to the lease were void for vagueness; and
- because the relief claimed was not certain and definite in its terms and therefore incompetent.

The thrust of the exception was that the essential terms of any agreement, in order to be enforceable between the parties thereto, had to be agreed to or at least capable of ascertainment. It was alleged that this had not occurred in the present case. It was argued further that an agreement which required further negotiations, as in the present matter, could not acquire contractual force; at best for the plaintiff, it was an agreement to agree, which was unenforceable.

The court held that, before an agreement of lease came into existence, there had to be an agreement between the parties upon the use and enjoyment of the property and the rental to be paid. Agreement upon the use and enjoyment of the property involved the identification of the property.

Furthermore, the intended use of the property was not stipulated, so the parties had not agreed upon the use and enjoyment of the property, which was a requirement in any lease agreement. The agreement also contained no provision for the rental to be paid, another essential element of a contract of lease.

The provision for the appointment of an arbitrator provided a dispute-resolution mechanism, not one for fixing the rent or any other term of the lease.

The plaintiff's reliance on such contract therefore disclosed no cause of action. For a dispute to exist in the present context, there first had to be something more than a subjective intention on the part of the contracting parties which were not the same. There had to be some basis for an objective debate between them. There was no such basis in the present case; the appointment of an arbitrator could not assist the plaintiff in this regard.

== See also ==
- South African contract law
- South African law of lease
