= SA Bus and Taxi Association v Cape of Good Hope Bank =

In SA Bus and Taxi Association v Cape of Good Hope Bank 1987 (4) SA 315 (C), an important case in the South African law of lease, the applicant had expressed interest in hiring certain business premises owned by the respondent, to which it had been introduced by the respondent's agents, DRE. As a consequence, DRE forwarded to the applicant's head office a memorandum of agreement of lease for signature, accompanied by a letter dated September 18, in which the applicant was requested to return the memorandum, duly signed, as soon as possible, together with a cheque for the first month's rental, deposit and incidental charges.

== History ==
The lease was to commence on October 1, 1986. In terms of clause 3 of the memorandum, rental was payable in advance on the first day of each month, failing which the lessor was entitled summarily to cancel the lease. On October 8, the applicant sent a letter to DRE enclosing a cheque for the amount requested and advising DRE that the memorandum would be signed and returned after its executive meeting, which would be held at the end of October. The respondent deposited the cheque.

The memorandum was signed on November 4, and was returned, together with a cheque for November rental, to DRE. That cheque was not deposited. Instead, it was returned to the applicant, together with a cheque for the amount previously tendered and deposited. The applicant was informed in writing that the respondent had not regarded itself as having concluded an agreement of lease with it.

== Details of the case ==
The applicant applied for an interdict to prevent the respondent from leasing the premises to any other person on the grounds that a valid lease agreement had been concluded and had not been validly cancelled, and for a mandamus directing the respondent to allow the applicant free and undisturbed access to the premises.

The applicant alleged that the respondent's conduct had been motivated by racism, which the respondent strenuously denied. It contended that no agreement had been concluded: DRE's letter to the applicant, enclosing the memorandum, had been no more than an invitation to the applicant to submit an offer to lease the respondent's premises, which the applicant had done by signing the memorandum. That offer the respondent had not accepted. It submitted, in the alternative, that, if a valid agreement had been concluded (which was not conceded), it had justifiably cancelled that agreement due to non-payment of rental for October and November by the due date, being the first day of the month.

The court held, as to the issue of whether or not a valid agreement of lease had been concluded, that an examination of the letter written to the applicant by DRE on September 18, and the applicant's reply thereto, dated 8 October, made it clear that the parties had reached consensus on the essentials of the lease: Once the applicant had accepted the terms and conditions contained in the memorandum attached to DRE's letter (which it had, by sending its cheque for the first month's rental, deposit and other charges), a binding agreement would have been concluded between the parties.

The court held that the argument that the memorandum of agreement had to be signed, at least by the applicant, if not by both parties, before a contract of lease came into existence, could not be upheld. There had been nothing in DRE's letter of September 18 to indicate that signature of the memorandum was a precondition for the existence of a legally valid contract. The fact that the respondent had accepted and deposited the applicant's cheque was yet another indication that a lease had come into existence. The respondent, then, had failed to discharge the onus of proving that signature by the parties to the memorandum had been an essential prerequisite to a binding lease.

As to the question of whether or not the lease had been validly cancelled, the court held that the agreement had not provided for any days of grace for the payment of rent. The respondent had thus been entitled to terminate the lease when the applicant had submitted payment for November after November 1. The applicant, therefore, had no right to occupy the premises and no right to restrain the respondent from leasing them to other persons.
