= Business Aviation Corporation v Rand Airport Holdings =

South African legal case

Business Aviation Corporation (Pty) Ltd and Another v Rand Airport Holdings (Pty) Ltd, a case in the South African law of lease, dealt with the lessee's entitlement in respect of improvement of leased property. The issue was whether Article 10 of the Rental Housing Act (RHA) applied: Specifically, did it apply in respect of urban and rural property?

The Supreme Court of Appeal held that the RHA applies only to rural tenements; therefore, it was a question of use.

== See also ==
- South African law of lease
