= Totoyi v Ncuka =

South African legal case

In Totoyi v Ncuka, an important case in the South African law of lease, the parties had agreed that the amount of rent after the first four years was to rise gradually from two pounds and ten shillings per annum, "but not to exceed 4 pounds per annum." The court held that the formula was too vague to be converted into a sum of money.

The case of Raner and Bernstin v Armitage must be distinguished from this one, as there a lessee had the option to renew, one of the terms of the option being that "the [...] rental shall not exceed the sum of 75 pounds per month." The court in Raner held that this formula was adequate, because it meant that the lessee had the right to renew at the rental of 75 pounds per month.

The distinction between the two cases lies in the fact that, in Totoyi, the formula stipulated an indefinite period, during which indefinite amounts would be added, whereas in the second the formula referred to a precise moment in time (the date of renewal) and allowed the whole amount of the rise to take place at that time.

== See also ==
- South African law of lease
