= Croatia Meat v Millennium Properties =

South African legal case

Croatia Meat CC v Millennium Properties (Pty) Ltd (Sofokleous Intervening) was a court case in South Africa, considered important in the South African law of lease.

== The case ==
=== Overview ===
Sofokleous ran a supermarket from premises leased from Millennium Properties, which owned the shopping centre in which the supermarket was situated. Clause 6.4 of the lease agreement prohibited Millennium from leasing other premises in the shopping centre for the purpose of conducting a business similar to that of the lessee. When Sofokleous realised that Millennium had entered into a lease with Croatia Meat, giving the latter the right to run a butchery from the shopping centre, he sought an interdict prohibiting Millennium from permitting any person other than himself to conduct a butchery business from any premises in that centre.

=== Legal issues ===
The two main issues in the two applications were:

1. whether Millennium had breached its lease with Sofokleous by entering into the lease with Croatia; and, if so,
2. whether Sofokleous was entitled to an interdict or Croatia to an order for specific performance.

The court held that Sofokleous was running a fully equipped butchery from within the supermarket, and that it could not be said that his was a supermarket that merely sold meat as a part of its usual range of food. Millennium had acted in breach of clause 6.4 of the lease agreement with Sofokleous when it entered into the lease with Croatia.

The question was which of the competing and irreconcilable claims for specific performance by the innocent parties, Sofokleous and Croatia, should be enforced, and which party had to be left with a claim for damages against Millennium.

=== Judgement ===
The court held that, although the damages Sofokleous would suffer on a month-to-month basis appeared to be less than what Croatia was suffering, Croatia was able to limit its damages by finding alternative premises if Sofokleous's claim were upheld, resulting in a loss far less than the long-term loss that Sofokleous would suffer. There was thus no overriding equity that favoured either of the claims for specific performance.

The rule qui prior est tempore potior est jure, as applied to the law of double sales, had therefore to be applied. Sofokleous's claim was upheld and that of Croatia dismissed.

== See also ==
- South African law of lease
