= Brown v Mbhense =

South African legal case

Brown v Mbhense and Another 2008 (5) SA 489 (SCA); [2008] 4 All SA 26 (SCA) is an important case in the South African law of lease.

The respondent instituted an action in the Land Claims Court for an order declaring her to be a "labour tenant" as defined in the Land Reform (Labour Tenants) Act.

The appellant was the owner of the farm in question and did not oppose the plaintiff's action.

The plaintiff's claim succeeded in the court a quo, and the defendant appealed against that decision to the Supreme Court of Appeal, which held that to gauge the existence of a labour-tenancy agreement in the technical and precise manner akin to that applicable to usual residential or commercial tenancies was far too restrictive an approach, and one that went against the objective and general tenor of the Act.

== See also ==
- South African law of lease
