= Rubin v Botha =

South African legal case

In Rubin v Botha, an important case in the South African law of lease, Botha purported to lease to Rubin and his partner a piece of land for a period of ten years. No money was to pass, but the purported lessee was to erect a dwelling house, a stable and a fowl-run, for which no compensation was to be claimable at the end of the lease.

The court held that Rubin was indeed a tenant, as the compensation for the use and occupation of the land was that the parties intended that the buildings erected should become the property of the lessor at the expiration of ten years.

== See also ==
- South African law of lease
