= Coopers & Lybrand v Bryant =

South African legal case

Coopers & Lybrand and Others v Bryant is an important case in South African contract law, particularly in the area of contractual interpretation. It was heard in the Appellate Division by Joubert JA, EM Grosskopf JA, MT Steyn JA, Nienaber JA and Howie JA on 15 May 1995, with judgment handed down on 30 May.

== Facts ==
Bryant sued the Coopers & Lybrand, a firm of chartered accountants and auditors, in a Circuit Court for damages arising from an alleged breach by Coopers & Lybrand of a verbal agreement between them. Coopers & Lybrand, in a special plea to the Bryant's particulars of claim, contended that Bryant's claim was subject to the terms of a deed of cession concluded between him and Standard Bank, and that in consequence he had divested himself of locus standi to institute the action in question. In his replication to the special plea Bryant averred that the deed, on a proper construction, covered only his business debts.

The court a quo dismissed the special plea with costs, and Coopers appealed.

== Arguments ==
The deed provided for the cession in securitatem debiti of Bryant's "right, title and interest to all book debts and other debts and claims of whatsoever nature" to the bank. The issue, therefore, was whether or not the terms of the deed were broad enough to encompass Bryant's claim against the appellants.

CDA Loxton SC, on behalf of the appellants, contended that the plain, ordinary and popular meaning of the words "and other debts and claims of whatsoever nature" were not capable of being restricted to book debts. These words were unambiguous and were intended to give wider security. The clear intention of the parties was to cover all debts of whatsoever nature, including book debts. It was contended that so literal a construction of the cession would not lead to any absurdity; neither would it be contrary to the expressed intention of the parties.

R Wise SC, on behalf of Mr Bryant, argued that, on a proper interpretation of the cession, it did not in its terms include Bryant's claim against the appellants. The parties' intention was that the words "and other debts and claims of whatsoever nature," like book debts, should relate to Bryant's trading business; the claim against the appellants did not.

== Judgment ==
The Appellate Division held that the matter was essentially one of interpretation: "I proceed to ascertain the common intention of the parties from the language used in the instrument." According to the "golden rule," the language had to be given "its grammatical and ordinary meaning, unless this would result in some absurdity, or some repugnancy or inconsistency with the rest of the instrument." The ordinary grammatical meaning of "book debt," the court found, citing the second edition of The Oxford English Dictionary, was a debt owed to a tradesman as recorded in his account books. The court noted, however, that a particular word or phrase ought never to be interpreted in vacuo. The golden rule provided that, having ascertained the literal meaning of the word or phrase in question, the court had to take into consideration the following:

1. the context in which such word or phrase was used in its interrelation to the contract as a whole, including the nature and purpose of the contract;
2. the background circumstances which explained the genesis and purpose of the contract: that is to say, matters probably present in the minds of the parties when they contracted; and
3. extrinsic evidence regarding previous negotiations and correspondence between the parties, as well as their subsequent conduct, "showing the sense in which they acted on the document, save direct evidence of their own intentions." This is necessary when the language of the document is on the face of it ambiguous.

The court determined that the purpose of the cession was to provide the bank, as cessionary, with continuing security for allowing Bryant, as cedent, access to its banking facilities. As to background circumstances, it was common cause that Bryant had two separate accounts with the bank: a private account for his personal affairs and a business account for his one-man trading business. It was also common cause, as a background circumstance, that Bryant, on 4 April 1985, had asked the bank for an increase of his business account's overdraft facilities in the amount of R60,000.

The court held that expression "book debts" in the deed of cession "unquestionably" referred to Bryant's trading debts, and that expressions such as "trading," "records," "accounts," "books" and "in the name of the firm in which I may be trading" were "obviously" intended by the parties to refer to the trading business. Furthermore, there was nothing in the deed to indicate that the parties intended to provide security to the bank for Bryant's personal affairs:

This may be illustrated by means of a few examples such as personal claims of Mr Bryant based on a marriage settlement, a claim to recover a legacy under a will, a vindicatory action to recover his private assets etc.

The parties accordingly had never intended to include personal claims under the phrase "and other debts and claims of whatever nature." It was clear, the court found, "from the nature and purpose of the said cession, including its context as a whole," that the phrase was intended to refer instead to business debts, including claims other than book debts.

As Bryant's claim was clearly a personal one, and therefore unrelated to his trading debts, and as the terms of the deed were accordingly not wide enough to include such a claim, the court found that the cession did not divest Bryant of his claim.

In view of this conclusion, the court found it unnecessary to consider the parties' conduct after 16 April 1985, or any other extrinsic evidence relating to surrounding circumstances.

The appeal was thus dismissed with costs (including the costs of the two counsel) and the decision in the East London Circuit Court, in Bryant v Coopers & Lybrand and Others, reversed by a unanimous judgment.
