= Exceptio non adimpleti contractus =

The exceptio non adimpleti contractus is a defence that can be raised in the case of a reciprocal contract. In essence, it is a remedy that allows a party to withhold his own performance, accompanied by a right to ward off a claim for such performance until the other party has duly performed his or her obligations under the contract.

== Origins in the Roman Law ==
The first use of such defence was attested in the historical sources in concern to the Roman Law. There, it was used as an 'exceptio', i.e. in response to a legal claim from the other party in a contractual obligation.

== Requirements for the exceptio non adimpleti contractus ==
Two requirements must be met in order for the exceptio non adimpleti contractus to be available. The two performances must be reciprocal to one another; and the other party must be obliged to perform first.

== In the Continental Legal Systems ==
It is provided in the legislation of all European countries using the Civil Law System, especially those with strong influence from the Napoleonic Code (1805).

- In Brazil, it is provided in Art. 476 of the Brazilian Civil Code.
- In Italy, it is provided in Article 1460 of the Italian Civil Code.
- In Belgium, it is provided in Article 5.98 and Article 5.239 of the New Civil Code (Nieuw Burgerlijk Wetboek or Code civil de 2019).
- In the Netherlands, it is provided in Article 6:262 of the Dutch Civil Code (Burgerlijk Wetboek).
- In Russia, it is provided in art. 328 of the Russian Civil Code.
- In Poland, it is provided in art. 488, § 2 of the Polish Civil Code.
- In Bulgaria, it is provided in Art. 90 of the Bulgarian Obligations and Contracts Act.
- In the province of Quebec in Canada, it is provided in article 1591 of the Civil Code of Quebec.

== Bibliography ==
- Dale Hutchinson & Chris-James Pretorius. The Law of Contract in South Africa, 2nd edn. Cape Town: Oxford University Press, 2013.
