= Lessor =

Owner of property being leased to a lessee

Lessor is a participant of the lease who takes possession of the property and provides it as a leasing subject to the lessee for temporary possession. For example, in leasehold estate, the landlord is the lessor and the tenant is the lessee. The lessor may be the owner of the property or an agent authorized on the owner's behalf. Commercial banks, credit non-bank organizations, leasing companies often act as lessors.

== Terminology ==
A lessor can be both legal entity and individual. Nevertheless, the term leasing company sometimes is used as a synonym to the term lessor.

The seller of the property and the lessor can be one and the same person.

== The role of lessor ==
The process of interaction of the lessor with other participants of the leasing contract is as follows:

1. The lessee chooses the seller who possesses the required property
2. The lessor acquires this property. They acquire the property not for their own use, but specifically for assignment for temporary use.
3. The lessor transfers the property to the lessee for temporary use for an agreed payment.
4. On completion of the contract, depending on its conditions, the property shall be returned to the lessor or passed into the ownership of the lessee.

For the whole time period of the leasing contract, the property is in the ownership of the lessor.

In case of failure of reimbursements of lease payments under the schedule specified in the contract, the lessor has the right to exempt the property from the lessee. In case of bankruptcy of the lessee, the lessor has the priority right for payments.

If the lessor contrary to the contract has interfered with the choice of the seller or leasing subject, they bear the responsibility for non-delivery of the equipment, personal injury of citizens while using the leasing subject, damage which is caused to the property of the lessee and the third parties. There are, however, exceptions from this norm.

In case of implementation of a high-priced project, the lessor may involve into the transaction additional sources of financial assets (through banks, insurance companies, investment funds, etc.).

== Official leasing operator ==
An official leasing provider (dealer) is a special type of lessor. This is the official supplier of specialized machinery, transport and equipment directly to the final consumer or through a leasing company. An official leasing operator cooperates with manufacturers (subsidiary offices) of prime machinery under the operator (dealer) agreement.

For the leasing company the official leasing operator acts as:

- official certified supplier;
- agent (provides leasing consumers – clients);
- insurance agent and liquidator (liquidation of machinery which is free from the financial lease).

For consumers, the official leasing operator acts as:

- official certified supplier;
- leasing broker (selects a leasing company, which is the most relevant to the requirements of the client, based on the needs and capabilities of the client);
- advisor on optimization of vehicle park for completing of customer's project;
- advisor on improvement of the effectiveness of the company’s processes associated with the use of machinery.

== Legislation ==
The rights and obligations of the lessor in the Russian Federation are regulated by contract, under the federal law "On financial rent (leasing)", the Tax Code of the Russian Federation, the Civil Code, and others; in Ukraine by the Law "On Financial Leasing" and many others; in Uzbekistan by Chapter 34 of the Civil Code of Uzbekistan and others. International leasing contracts are regulated under the UNIDROIT Convention on International Financial Leasing.

== See also ==
- Lease
