= Letter of intent =

Type of document

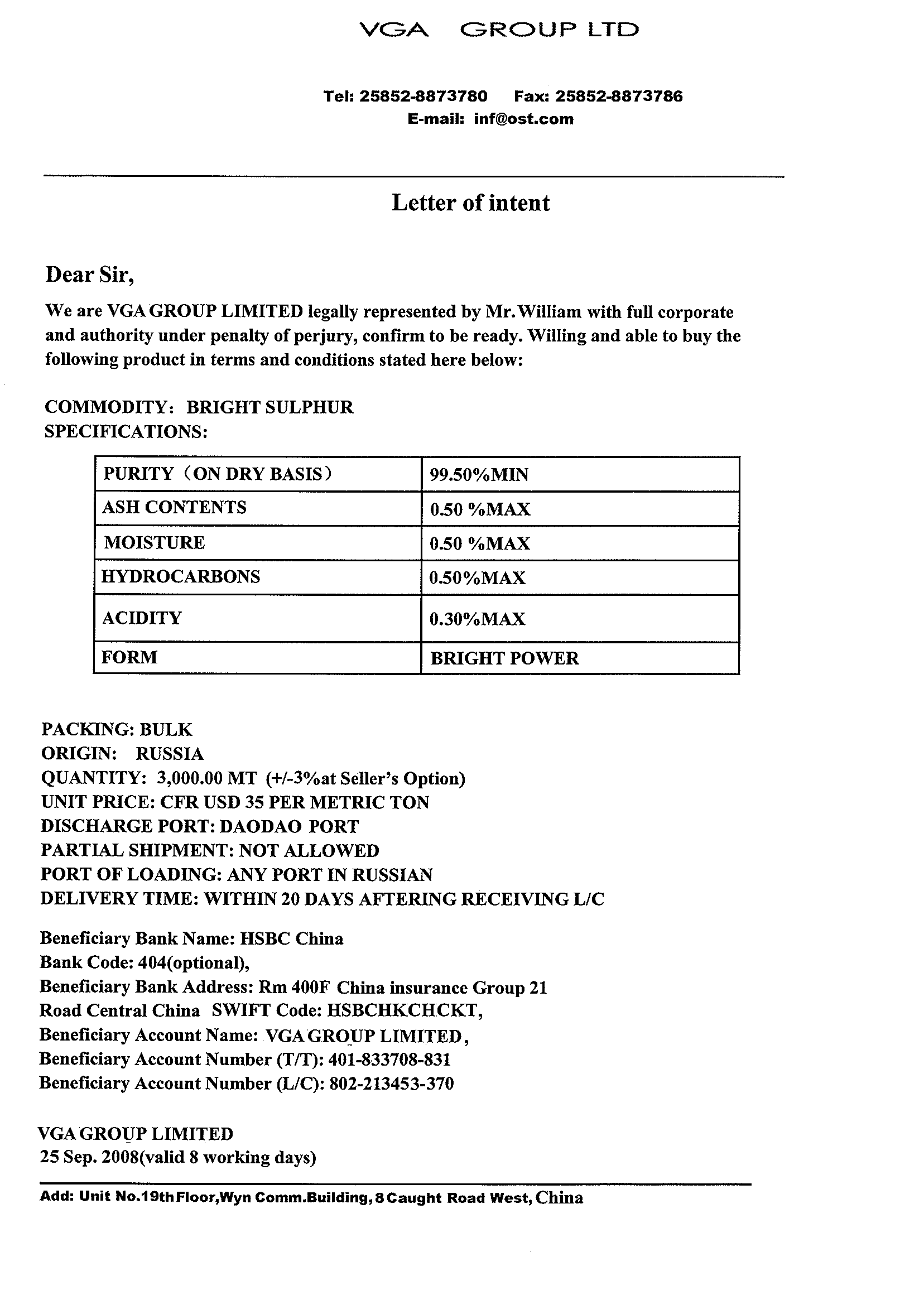
A typical LOI

A letter of intent (LOI or LoI) is a document outlining the understanding between two or more parties which they intend to formalize in a legally binding agreement. The concept is similar to a heads of agreement, term sheet or memorandum of understanding. Merger and acquisition agreements, joint venture agreements, real property lease agreements and several other categories of agreements often make use of a letter of intent.

LOIs resemble short, written contracts, often in tabular form. They are not binding on the parties in their entirety. Many LOIs, however, contain provisions that are binding, such as those governing non-disclosure, governing law, exclusivity or a covenant to negotiate in good faith. An LOI may sometimes be interpreted by a court of law as binding the parties to it if it too closely resembles a formal contract and does not contain a clear disclaimer.

An LOI may be presented by one party to another party and subsequently negotiated before execution (or signature). If carefully negotiated, an LOI may serve to protect both parties to a transaction. For example, a seller of a business may incorporate what is known as a non-solicitation provision, which would restrict the buyer's ability to hire an employee of the seller's business should the two parties not be able to close the transaction. On the other hand, an LOI may protect the buyer of a business by making its obligation to complete the transaction conditional on securing financing.

== Purposes ==
Common reasons for using a letter of intent include:

- allowing parties to sketch out fundamental terms quickly before expending substantial resources on negotiating definitive agreements, finalizing due diligence, pursuing third-party approvals and other matters
- to declare officially that the parties are negotiating, as in a merger or joint venture proposal
- to provide safeguards in case a deal collapses during negotiation
- to verify certain issues regarding payments made for someone else (e.g. credit card payments)

The potential downsides to using an LOI may include:

- The parties may engage in protracted negotiations on only a subset of the terms of a deal
- Management time and focus may be diverted
- Alternative opportunities may be missed and markets may move against the parties during negotiations
- Parties may set down an unworkable deal framework in an LOI, in the hope of making progress later
- Public disclosure obligations may be inadvertently triggered
- The risk of leaks, exacerbated by the desire of some to tout the LOI to the world, or shop it to other parties

== Specific examples ==
In academia, a letter of intent, also often referred to as a statement of intent, is part of the admissions process for graduate programs. The document, similar to a cover letter for a job application, a statement of purpose or an application essay, typically outlines an applicant's academic background, their interest in the chosen field of study, and how the specific graduate program relates to their career goals.

In education in the United States, letters of intent are also frequently reached between high school senior athletes and colleges and universities, for the reservation of athletic scholarships for the athletes upon graduation from high school. School administrators in secondary education often require a letter of intent before approving the formation of a student club.

In real estate, in cases where the real property in question is not listed on a multiple listing service, there may not be an easy way to notify the owner of the property and other interested parties of intent to purchase. Often it is necessary to officially begin the process of a purchase, and allow all peripheral interested parties to begin any other processes, with a letter of intent. For example, a multimillion-dollar loan for a commercial property may require a letter of intent before a financial institution will allow personnel to spend time working on the loan. A tenant and landlord may sign a letter of intent prior to signing a lease agreement to stipulate rental rates and the terms of the future tenancy.

In the solicitation of US government grants, a letter of intent is highly encouraged, but it is not required or binding, and does not enter into the review of a subsequent application. The information that it contains allows agency staff to estimate the potential workload and plan the review.

In the UK construction industry, it has been noted that "a significant element" within the industry appears to be "content to have their commercial and legal relationships defined on the basis of a letter of intent rather than by clear and definite contracts", as a consequence of which problems "often arise" in relation to liability. In 2012, the Ampleforth Abbey Trust, which runs Ampleforth College, successfully sued the project management firm Turner & Townsend, which had engaged a construction company to build residential accommodation for the Abbey's students on the basis of a series of letters of intent rather than a formal contract. The trust's position was undermined in the absence of a contract, and Turner & Townsend were held to have breached their duty of care in leaving the trust exposed without contractual protection.

== See also ==
- Letter of comfort (contract law)
- National Letter of Intent
