= Learstar =

Learstar may refer to:

- LearStar 600 or Bombardier Challenger 600, a family of business jets
- PacAero Learstar or Lockheed Model 18 Lodestar, a passenger transport aircraft of the World War II era
