= Soft probe =

Informal regulatory inquiry seeking information without initiating formal action

A soft probe is a confirmation method used by banks to verify funding for a seller from a buyer, conducted by the seller's bank to the buyer's bank. Such a probe is not recorded in the buyer's banking information, and usually nothing but confirmation or lack of confirmation is recorded by the seller.

Authorization for a soft probe is normally provided as part of a bank letter of comfort provided by a buyer when placing Irrevocable Corporate Purchase Order in international trade.
