= 2018 Iran Bombardier Challenger crash =

Aviation accident in Iran

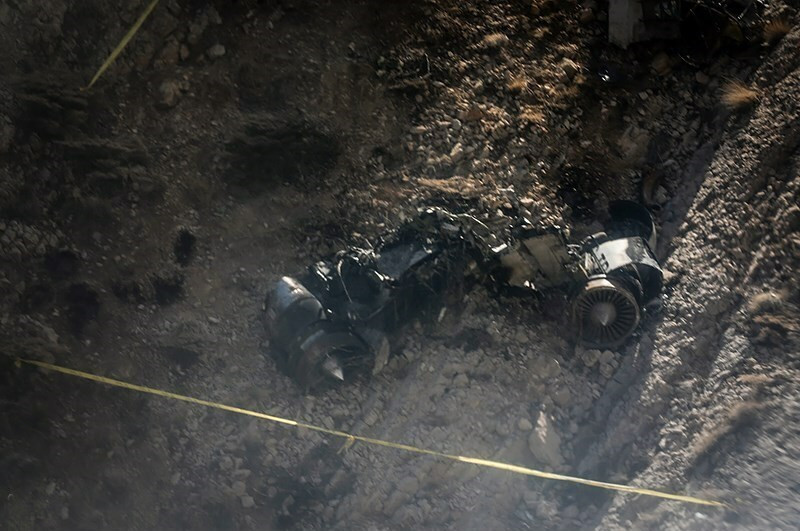
- Part of the wreckage of TC-TRB

Accident
- Date: 11 March 2018
- Summary: Loss of control in cruise
- Site: Zagros Mountains, near Shahr-e Kord, Chaharmahal and Bakhtiari Province, Iran; 31°45′59″N 50°44′57″E

Aircraft
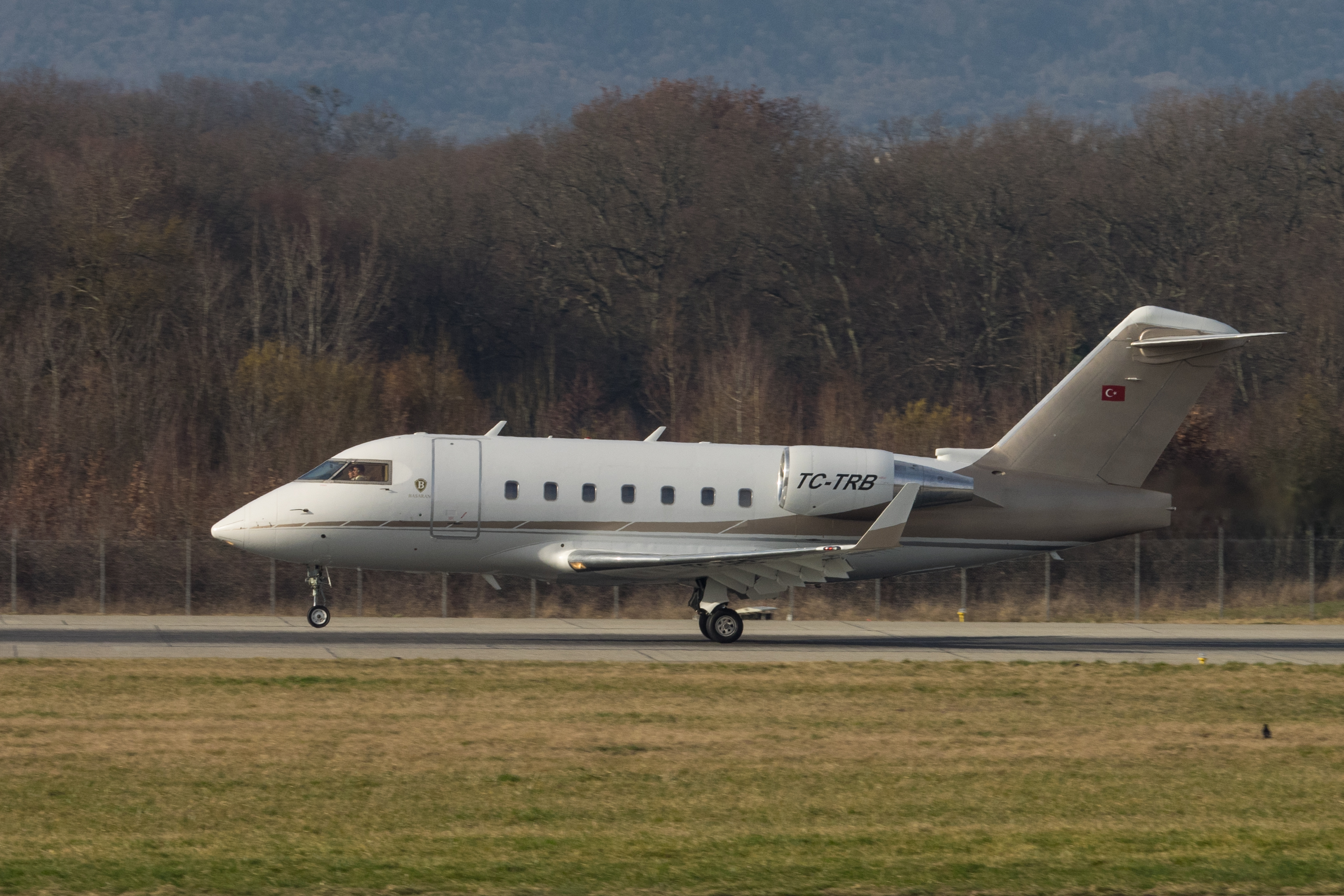
- TC-TRB, the aircraft involved, photographed in 2016
- Aircraft type: Bombardier Challenger 604
- Operator: Başaran Holding
- Registration: TC-TRB
- Flight origin: Sharjah International Airport, United Arab Emirates
- Destination: Istanbul Atatürk Airport, Turkey
- Occupants: 11
- Passengers: 8
- Crew: 3
- Fatalities: 11
- Survivors: 0

On 11 March 2018, a Bombardier Challenger 604 private jet, owned by Turkish group Başaran Holding, crashed in the Zagros Mountains near Shahr-e Kord, Iran, while returning to Istanbul from Sharjah. All three crew members and eight passengers on board were killed.

== History ==
The aircraft, registered TC-TRB, departed from Sharjah International Airport, United Arab Emirates, at around 17:11 local time (13:11 UTC), bound for Istanbul Atatürk Airport. The flight crew consisted of two pilots and a cabin attendant. The captain, 36-year-old Beril Gebeş, had flown for Turkish Airlines in the past, while the First Officer, 40-year-old Melike Kuvvet, had a military aviation background, and had been one of the first female pilots in the Turkish armed forces.

The aircraft reached a cruising altitude of just over 35,000 ft (11,000 m). At around 18:01 IRST local time (14:31 UTC), shortly before contact was lost, the crew reported technical problems and requested clearance from air traffic control to descend to a lower altitude. The jet began to climb before abruptly losing altitude, and at 18:09, hit the Zagros Mountains near Shahre Kord, some 370 km (230 mi) south of Tehran, Iran. All eleven occupants were killed. One witness reportedly saw the aircraft on fire before the crash.

== Victims ==
The jet was carrying a group of eight friends returning from a bachelorette party in Dubai. Among them was Mina Başaran, daughter of the head of Başaran Holding, Hüseyin Başaran, and member of the company's board of directors.

== Recovery operations ==
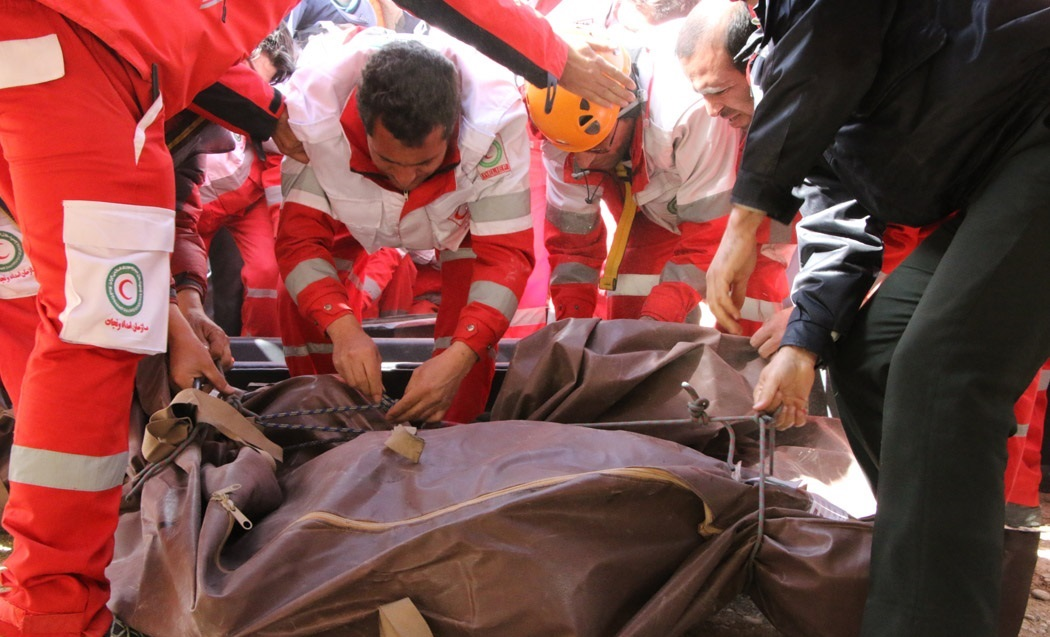
Search and rescue workers at the scene

Local villagers saw a plume of smoke rising from the wreckage, and were the first to arrive at the scene. Iranian search-and-rescue teams arrived afterwards and found the burned bodies of ten victims. Bad weather conditions at the crash site made the operation difficult. One victim has yet to be found. The recovered bodies were transported to Tehran by helicopter. Turkey then sent emergency personnel via a military jet for assistance. Identification of the bodies required DNA testing.

After identification by the Iranian authorities, the bodies of ten victims were flown to Istanbul by the Turkish military and then handed over to the victims' families. Iranian Legal Medicine Organization stated that the remains of the captain were not among the recovered bodies in the eleven body bags from the wreckage.

== Investigation ==
The aircraft's two flight recorders (the flight data recorder and the cockpit voice recorder) were recovered for analysis.

In September 2018, the Aircraft Accident Investigation Board of the Iranian civil aviation authority published a preliminary report indicating that, shortly before reaching cruise altitude, a discrepancy between the airspeed indications shown to the two pilots became apparent, with one indicating an overspeed condition. Engine power was reduced, and shortly after the stick-shaker activated. The aircraft subsequently stalled and entered a steep descent during which both engines flamed out. Control was not regained and the aircraft eventually struck a mountainside. In March 2020, the AAIB issued its final report, concluding that the accident was caused by insufficient training for airspeed indication failure and poor crew resource management.
