= Bombardier Challenger 600 series =

Business jet family by Canadair, later Bombardier

Challenger 600 series
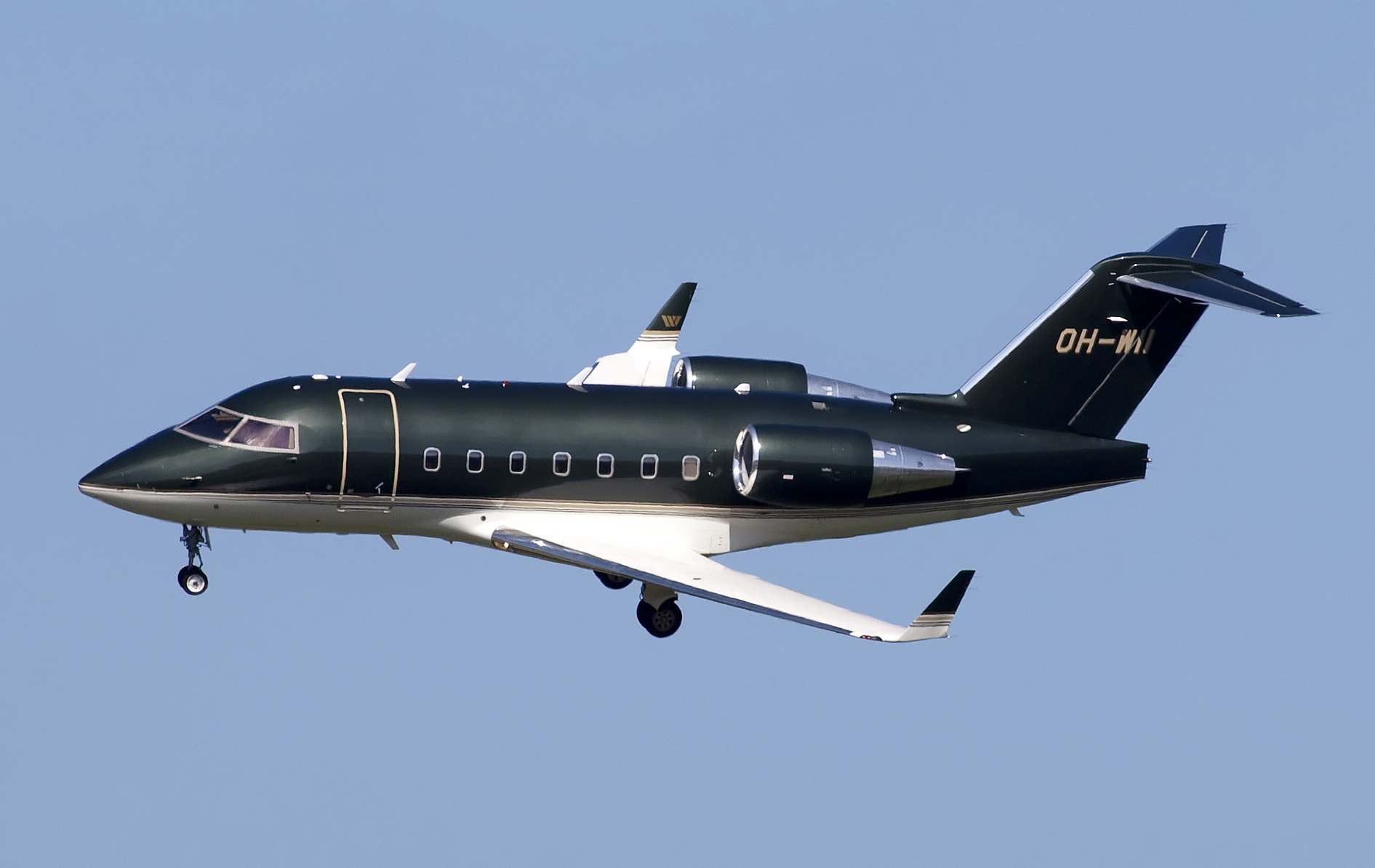
- A Bombardier CL-604

General information
- Type: Business jet
- Manufacturer: Canadair; Bombardier Aerospace
- Status: In production
- Number built: 1,066 (October 2018)

History
- Manufactured: 1980–present
- First flight: 8 November 1978
- Developed into: Bombardier CRJ100/200; Bombardier Global Express

The Bombardier Challenger 600 series is a family of business jets developed by Canadair after a Bill Lear concept, and then produced from 1986 by its new owner, Bombardier Aerospace. At the end of 1975, Canadair began funding the development of LearStar 600, and then bought the design for a wide-cabin business jet in April 1976. On 29 October, the programme was launched, backed by the Canadian federal government, and designed to comply with new FAR part 25 standards.

In March 1977, it was renamed the Challenger 600 after Bill Lear was phased out, and the original conventional tail was changed for a T-tail among other developments. The first prototype was rolled out on 25 May 1978, and performed its maiden flight on 8 November. The flight test program saw a deadly crash on 3 April 1980, but Transport Canada approved the CL-600 type certification on 10 August 1980.

In 1986, Canadair was close to bankruptcy and was bought by Bombardier. The jet was later stretched into the Bombardier CRJ regional airliner, introduced on 19 October 1992, and the longer range Global Express, introduced in July 1999. The 500th Challenger was rolled out in May 2000, and the 1000th was delivered to NetJets in December 2015. By October 2018, 1,066 aircraft had been built.

The Challenger is a low-wing jet powered by two turbofans mounted in aft fuselage pods, with a supercritical wing and a stand-up cabin with two seating sections. The original Lycoming ALF 502 turbofans were replaced by a pair of General Electric CF34s on the CL-601, which also gained winglets, and first flew on 10 April 1982. Subsequent variants have updated systems, avionics, and higher weights.

== Development ==
=== Origins ===
Initial LearStar 600 concept, with conventional tail

Around 1974, American aviation inventor Bill Lear conceptualised the LearStar 600, a low-wing, long-distance business jet, which was powered by a pair of Garrett TFE731-1 geared turbofan engines and equipped with a supercritical wing. Lear lacked the capabilities to launch such an aircraft, thus sought out other agencies to collaborate with to both produce and sell it, including the Canadian aerospace manufacturer Canadair. According to authors Ron Picklet and Larry Milberry, Canadair's top management were of the opinion that Lear's concept was sketchy at best. Lear did not have an expert grasp of aeronautical engineering; so far, he had only been able to pay an American aeronautical consultant to undertake very preliminary design explorations.

Following a study, contrasting the proposed Learstar against rivals such as the Lockheed Jetstar, Dassault Falcon 50, and Grumman Gulfstream II, Canadair decided to give its backing to the idea near the end of 1975. According to aerospace industry publication Flight International, the programme was viewed by many Canadians as a step towards developing a privately driven high-technology aviation industry that would compete at a global level. Perhaps more importantly, the Canadian government had issued a demand that Canadair become self-sufficient, thus the company wanted to depend less upon subcontracting arrangements with other firms, such as France's Dassault Aviation and America's Boeing, or providing support packages for existing aircraft for which they had already ended production, such as the CF-5 fighter. Canadair felt a need to prove its ability to independently develop original high-tech projects at this time.

Canadair planned to use Lear's name and skills at self-promotion to secure extensive financial guarantees for a business-jet project from the Canadian federal government. This proved an effective choice: Future Prime Minister Jean Chrétien specifically refers to the effect of personal contact with Lear on his decision to direct financial support to Canadair's program. At the time of these events, Chrétien was successively president of the Treasury Board, minister of Industry, Trade, and Commerce, and minister of Finance, in the Canadian government. Due to the use of letters of comfort, the extent of the ministry's financial commitments for Canadair could be kept from parliament and the public for several years. These financial guarantees were later used as an academic example of insufficient monitoring and lax controls in government support of industry.

In April 1976, Canadair acquired the LearStar 600 concept. By then it was 63 ft (19 m) long, and 53.3 ft (16.2 m) wide, and capable of a maximum speed of Mach 0.85 and a range of 7,240 km (3,910 nmi). As an executive jet, it had sufficient capacity for 14 passengers. In a freighter configuration, it had a 3,400 kg (7,500 lb) payload capacity, loaded and unloaded through a forward door. As a commuter airliner, it could seat up to 30 passengers in a 2–1 seating configuration. Canadair developed the design into a large airframe, furnished with a new supercritical wing design, new avionics and engines, as well as for compliance with new FAR part 25 standards. The configuration was frozen in August and a 1/25 model was tested in the National Aeronautical Establishment transonic wind tunnel. Reportedly, in excess of 1,800 hours of wind tunnel testing were performed upon the supercritical wing alone.

=== Launch ===
Backed by the federal government, the programme was launched on 29 October 1976 with firm orders and deposits for 53 aircraft. Within the next two years, roughly 2,500 employees were involved in designing the aircraft. Changes to the original Learstar configuration had been made on the run up to the launch, such as the conventional tailplane being substituted for a T-tail counterpart after the former was found to be in the path of the engine's exhaust flow, the relocation of fuel storage to the wings, and multiple increases of the aircraft's gross weight. Following disagreements over the direction of the programme, Bill Lear was phased out of involvement. In March 1977, the aircraft was renamed the Challenger 600. Reportedly, following his disassociation with the venture, Lear referred to Canadair's revised design as Fat Albert. Following Lear's death in May 1978, Canadair paid an estimated $25 million to his estate for his contribution to the programme.

Due to the expansion of the design, the original powerplant configuration became untenable. Engine manufacturer Lycoming proposed developing a new model, the Lycoming ALF 502L, which Canadair's design team accepted for the enlarged Challenger, and around which drew up its general arrangement. The type's wide cargo door had been designed in response to the needs of FedEx, the type's original launch customer, having placed an order for 25 aircraft. FedEx had experienced problems with the General Electric CF34 engines, and favoured the Lycoming ALF 502D, instead. Those later had delivery troubles and lacked performance. Reportedly, FedEx converted most of its orders into the Challenger's stretched version, intending to carry up to 12,500 lb of freight. FedEx ultimately opted to cancel its orders due to the US Airline Deregulation Act, and the specific aircraft that were already in production were sold to other customers instead.

By the spring of 1977, Canadair had received over 70 firm orders and had begun constructing three prototypes. A $70 million loan was borrowed from European sources to help finance the program, which lessened the financial burden on the Canadian government. A full-scale fuselage mockup was displayed at the 1977 Paris Air Show before a European and North American tour. 106 were sold by the end of 1977. In late 1977, in the face of criticism that the project would not fulfil the performance guarantees made, Canadair stated that the first flight was to occur in 1978, and that initial deliveries were scheduled for September 1979. Flight International noted that even prior to the prototype's first flight, the type had already made a noticeable impact upon the competition, including the launch of the Cessna Citation III and Grumman Gulfstream III.

By early March 1978, the first prototype was almost finished and the assembly of the two other had debuted. Destined to control handling qualities and test flight performance, it was formally rolled out on 25 May 1978. 116 orders were confirmed 19 months after go-ahead. By this point, production jigs allowing for a production rate of up to seven Challengers per month had been established, ready for quantity production to proceed. Airframe structural testing began in February 1979. Operational test cycling started in December 1979, simulating 72,638 flight hours by February 1985, while its predicted lifetime was 30,000 hours.

=== Flight test phase ===
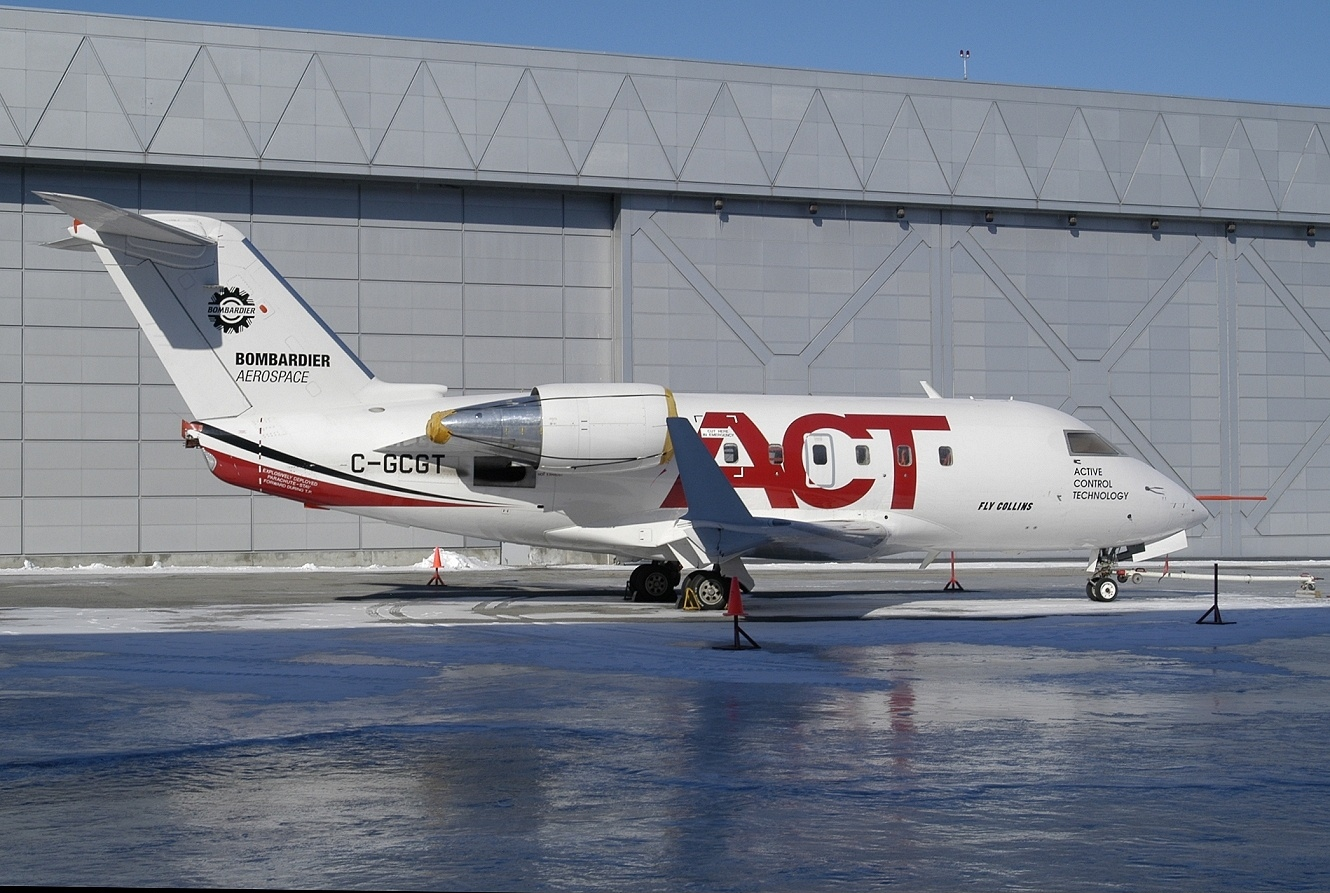
The third prototype was reused as the ACT fly-by-wire demonstrator.

On 8 November 1978, the prototype aircraft took off for its maiden flight from Montreal, Quebec. The flight test and certification program were conducted at Mojave Kern County Airport instead of Canada due to better weather. The second and third prototypes first flew during 1979. A test flight on 3 April 1980 in the Mojave Desert resulted in disaster. The aircraft crashed due to the failure of the release mechanism to detach the recovery chute after a deep stall, killing one of the test pilots. The other test pilot and the flight test engineer parachuted to safety.

The CL-600-1A11 type certification was approved by Transport Canada in August 1980, and by the US Federal Aviation Administration in November 1980.

The program cost was C$1.5 billion (US$1.1 billion at the time).

=== Further development ===
In 1980, the first production model of the Challenger series, the CL-600, entered service with end customers. Early marketing of the type by Canadair typically contrasted the more spacious cabin offered by the Challenger against its competitors, which typically had more narrow fuselages, and therefore cramped conditions, as well as the type's fuel economy. By 1982, while only 10 aircraft had entered service, the company had begun publicising a new model of the aircraft, the CL-601, which was to be powered by a pair of General Electric CF34 turbofan engines in place of the original models' Lycoming units. On 10 April 1982, the CL-601 performed its maiden flight. According to Flight International, the decision to adopt the CF34 engine for the new model was responsible for generating a substantial boom in Challenger sales.

According to Flight International, the slow initial sales of the Challenger heavily contributed to the near-bankruptcy of Canadair, which was only avoided by the purchase of the company by Bombardier in 1986. Bombardier elected not only to continue production of the type, but also to finance the development of new models and derivatives. This choice was aided by Canadair's design decision to enable the Challenger to be readily stretched from the onset. As of October 2018, the best-selling variant of the Challenger series has been the CL-604, which was launched in 1995. The 500th aircraft was rolled out in May 2000. The 1000th, a 650, was delivered to NetJets in December 2015.

According to Flight International, the Challenger 600 has been a foothold in the market for Bombardier, allowing them to more easily develop further business jets, such as the Bombardier Global Express. Another direct derivative of the Challenger series has been the Bombardier CRJ100 series, a larger regional airliner. The publication commented that the Challenger family "appears to have a solid future", observing a production rate of two aircraft per month throughout 2018.

== Design ==
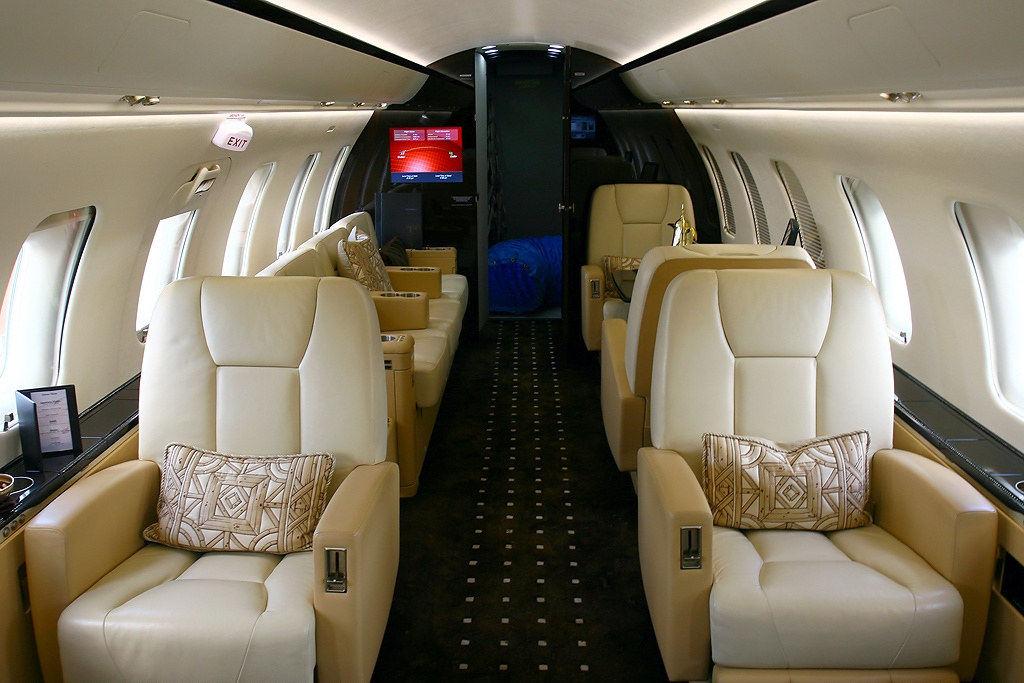
The Challenger stand-up, flat floor cabin

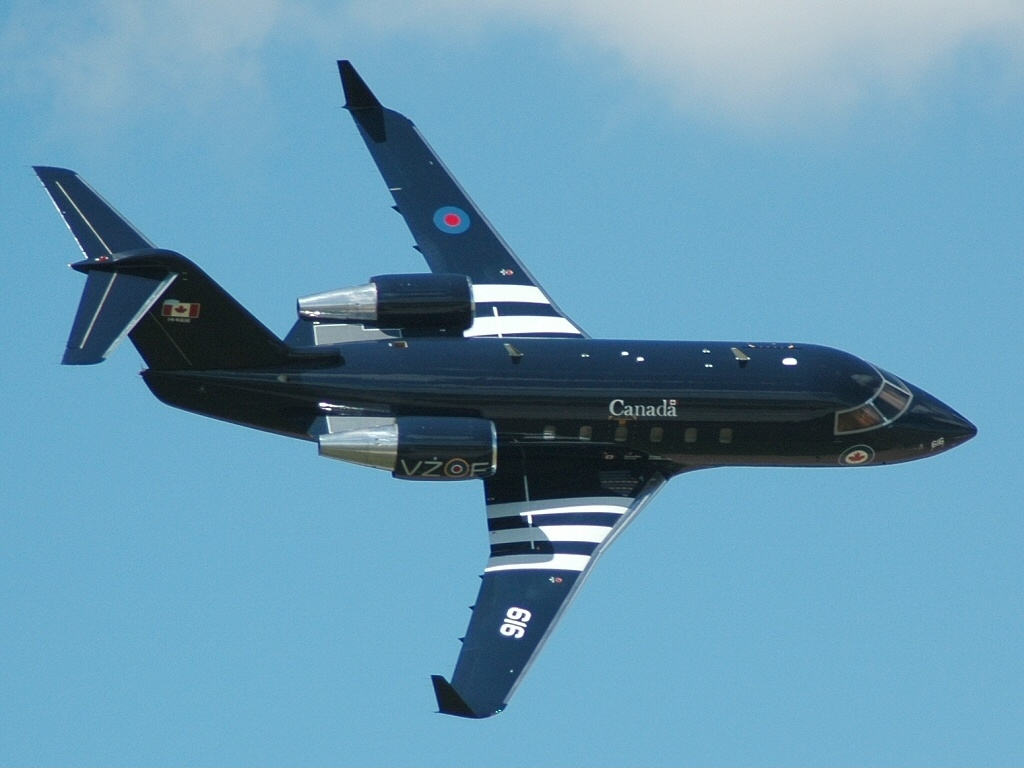
The Challenger (here a Royal Canadian Air Force CC-144) has a swept wing, a T-tail and two aft-mounted turbofans

The Challenger is a twin-engined business jet, described by Flight International as being a "miniaturised twinjet airliner in every respect". While the Challenger is generally similar in configuration to previous aircraft of its type, some of its features stand out; for example, a widened fuselage allows a "walk-about cabin". The Challenger was also one of the first business jets to be designed with a supercritical wing. The wing was referred to by Canadair as being one of the aircraft's most advanced features. It is also capable of performing short takeoffs while maintaining the speed and comfort levels normally associated with larger jetliners.

The Challenger's wing has been referred to as being a modified NACA symmetrical aerofoil. Akin to other supercritical wings, it features a rounded leading edge, an inverted camber, a blunt trailing edge and scalloping of the underside. The twin-spar wing box structure spans the entire length of the wing and is compartmentalised to form five internal fuel tanks; these tanks can accommodate up to 14,661 lb of fuel, nearly half the aircraft's empty weight.

The skins of the wings are produced using large milling machines, which in 1978 were claimed to be superior to anything else in North America. Many elements, such as the flaps, ailerons, and leading edge, feature conventional construction. Several parts, including the wing/fuselage fairing, flap shrouds, and wingtips, are moulded out of Kevlar, as are other elements of the aircraft.

The original CL-600 Challenger was powered by two Lycoming ALF 502L turbofan engines, which were developed specifically for the Challenger. Subsequent models adopted other powerplants, including the General Electric CF34 engine. The engines are mounted on the rear fuselage close to the aircraft's tail, providing smooth airflow to the engines even when flown at high angles of attack, although this was in a lower position than the original LearStar concept had placed them to mitigate unfavourable pitch control characteristics. The engines are fitted with thrust reversers to decrease landing distances. An auxiliary power unit is also present for starting the engines and providing air conditioning within the cabin while on the ground.

The fuselage comprises three sections — the nose, centre, and tail — which are manufactured separately in their own jigs and joined later on in the production process. It has been designed to be pressurised at a maximum differential of 9.3 lb/sq in. Various cutouts are present across the fuselage to accommodate features such as a large main door on the port side of the aircraft forward of the wing, multiple regulation-compliant emergency exits, a baggage hatch on the port-side aft of the wing, and numerous windows.

The fuselage diameter was designed to accommodate an unobstructed cabin floor, a cabin height of 6 ft 1 in in the centre section, and space for the wing box, underfloor integral fuel tanks, air ducts, and various control cabling. It was also designed to easily accommodate Canadair's early plans to stretch the fuselage, for which equal-length plugs are installed fore and aft of the centre section to greatly increase the Challenger's capacity.

Various avionics are present in the Challenger. As standard, the CL-600 is furnished with a dual-channel Sperry SPZ-600 automatic flight control system, incorporating a flight director and air data computers; more typical to larger commercial aircraft, this system is certifiable for conducting Category 3A automatic landings. The flight control system features significant redundancy, including three individual hydraulic systems; even with complete failure and the loss of one actuator, a viable level of assisted control over the key flight surfaces remains present. Weather radar and Marconi-built solid-state instrument displays are supplied as standard, as well as a Collins-built radio set; optional long-range, radio-based equipment, such as a HF radio set and VHF navigational aids can be installed.

In a standard executive aircraft configuration, the cabin is divided between the forward galley, and two seating sections, which are typically fitted with a four-chair club section followed by either a conference grouping area or divans, along with a lavatory at the aft end. The chairs are fully reclining and can swivel, while the divans can serve as sleeping accommodation. Early examples feature luxuries such as telephones, lighting controls, and stereo systems; foldaway tables attached to the cabin walls were also installed, along with a pair of wardrobes, one fore and one aft, for storing hand luggage and other small items.

== Variants ==
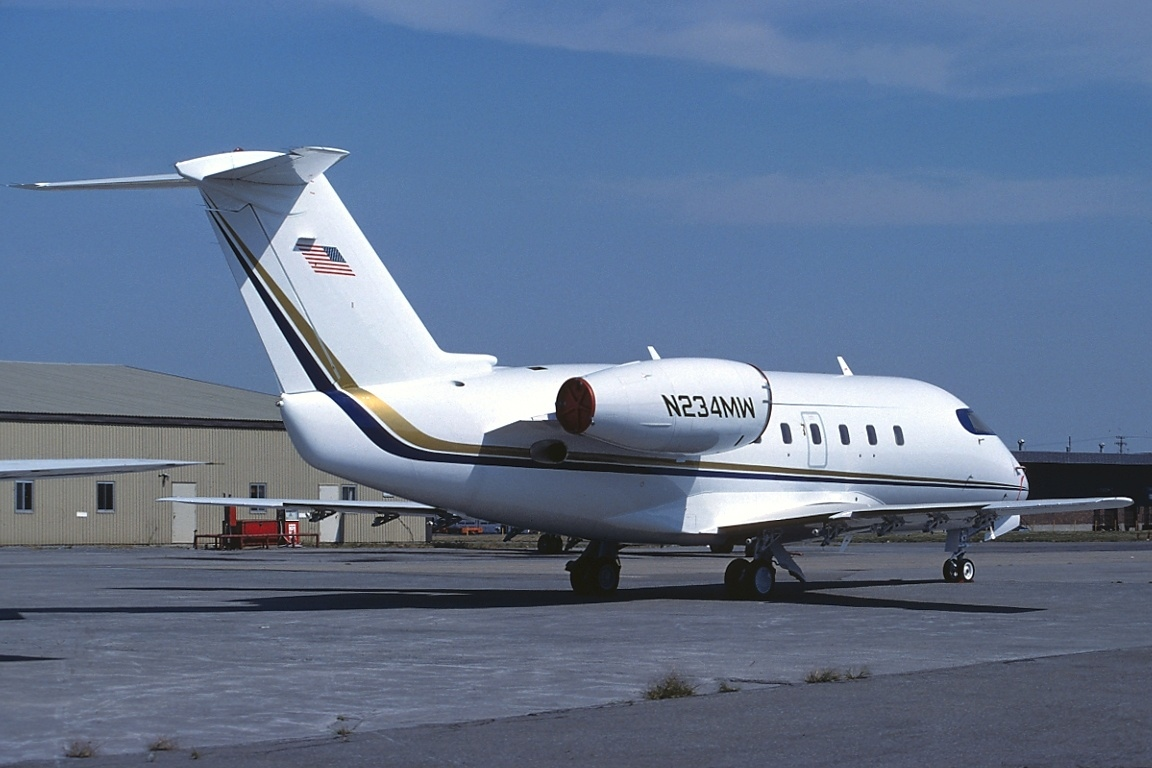
Original CL-600s have ALF 502s with full cowlings and do not have winglets, and their tail cones are truncated.

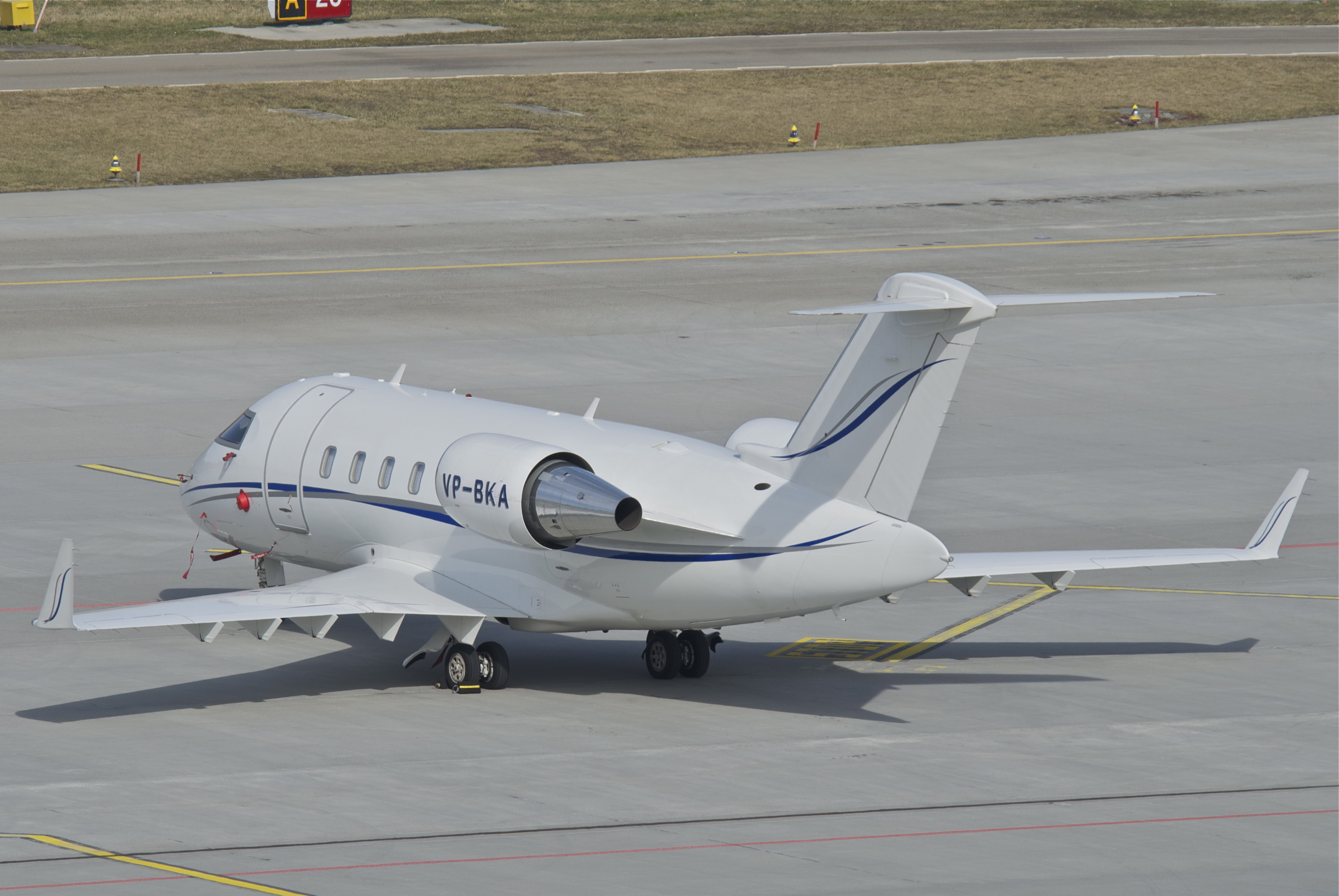
Later Challengers have winglets and are powered by CF34s with exposed nozzles, and from the pictured CL-605 have streamlined tail cones.

=== Challenger 600 (CL-600-1A11) ===
CL-600
Original production version, powered by Lycoming ALF 502L turbofans with 7,500 lbf (33,000 N) of thrust each, 81 built from 1978 to 1982
CL-600S
CL-600 with the winglets introduced on the CL-601-1A, three built
Canadair CC-144
Twelve aircraft were purchased by the Royal Canadian Air Force and delivered in 1982, including the CE-144 and CX-144. A further seven airframes have been procured from 1982 to 2020. Models CL-600, CL-601, CL-604, and CL-650 have all been procured to fill the role.
Canadair CE-144
Three electronic warfare (EW) trainers were converted to/from basic CC-144.
Canadair CX-144
Second prototype, a CL-600-1A11, c/n 1002, was allocated to the RCAF after finishing its test programme. Used at the Aerospace Engineering and Test Establishment (AETE), CFB Cold Lake until retirement in 1993, it is now preserved at the CFB Winnipeg, designated CC-144 in service.

=== Challenger 601-1A (CL-600-2A12) ===
CL-601-1A
A refined version with winglets to decrease drag and more powerful General Electric CF34-1A turbofans (66 built, including six Canadian Forces CC-144Bs)
CL-601-1A/ER
601-1A with additional fuel tank in the tail

=== Challenger 601-3A/3R (CL-600-2B16) ===
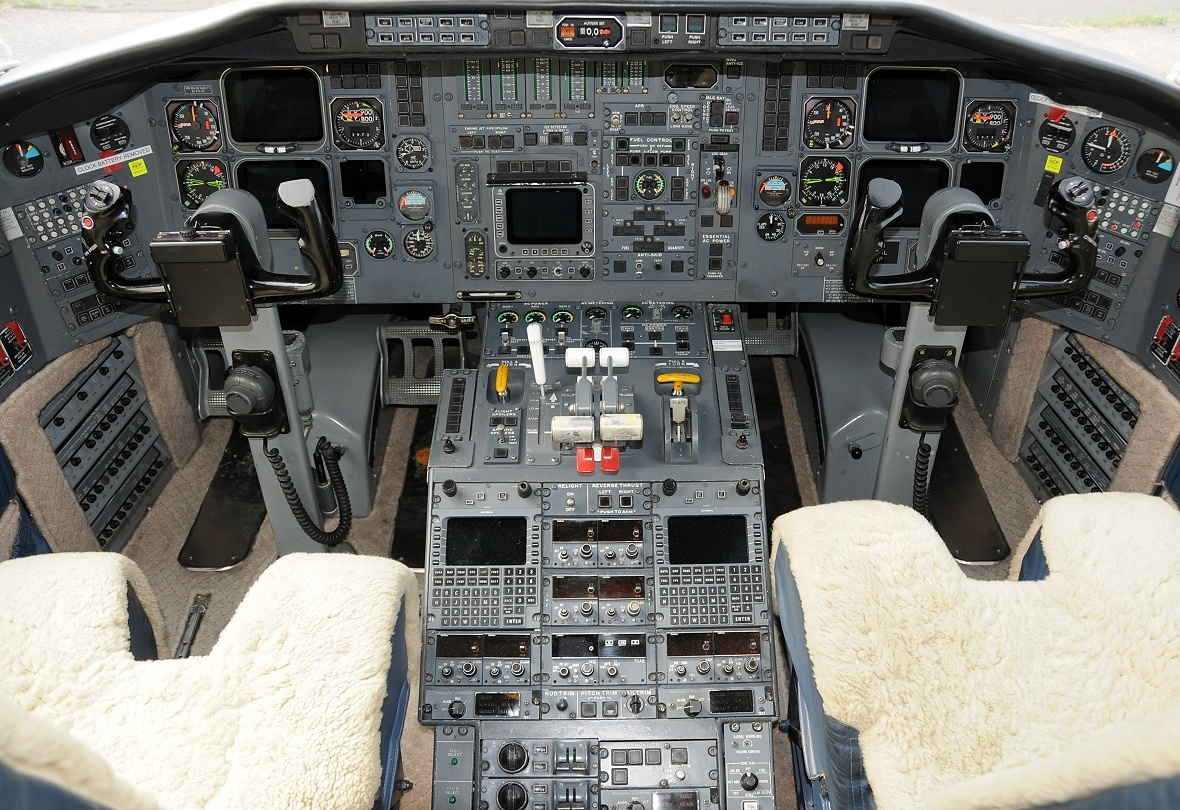
The 601 flight deck has a glass cockpit with small primary flight displays.

CL-601-3A
Equipped with General Electric CF34-3A turbofans with a higher flat rating and a glass cockpit. First version marketed by Bombardier.
CL-601-3A/ER
601-3A with additional fuel tank in the tail
CL-601-3R
Equipped with General Electric CF34-3A1 turbofans, tail tank made standard

=== Challenger 604/605/650 ===
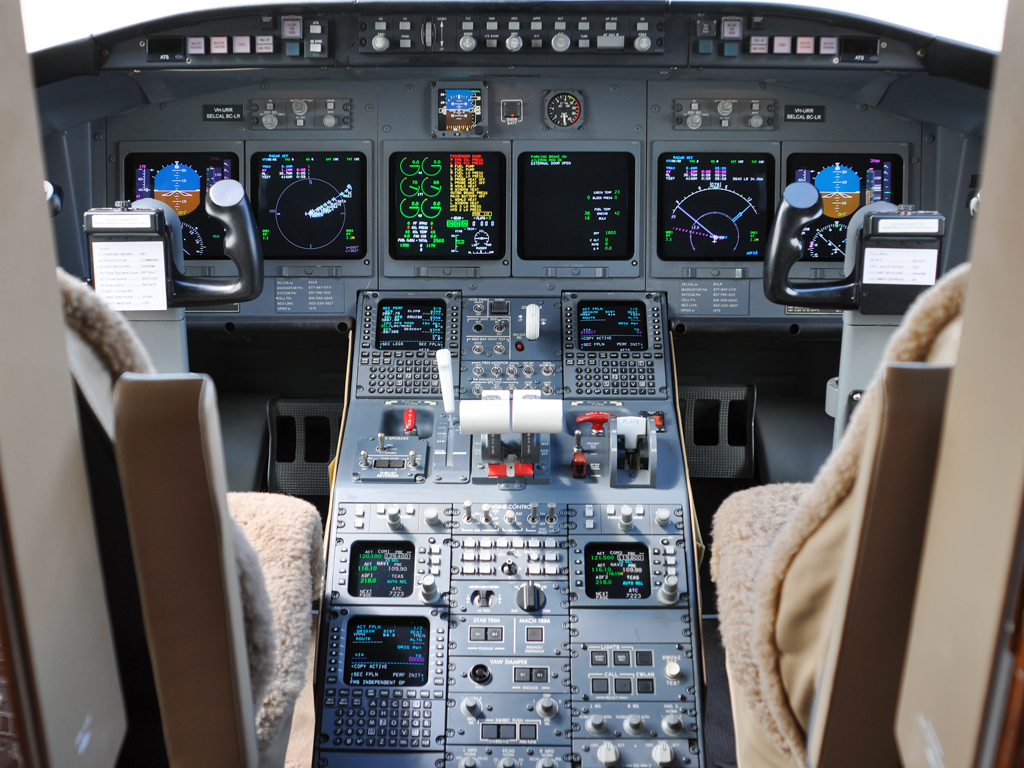
The 604 flight deck has the Pro Line 4 avionics system with larger screens.

CL-604
Equipped with General Electric CF34-3B turbofans, added saddle tanks for increased fuel capacity, new undercarriage for higher takeoff and landing weight; structural improvements to wings and tail, new Rockwell Collins Pro Line 4 avionics system
CL-604 MMA
(Multi-Mission Aircraft), militarized version, developed by Field Aviation, in Danish service. The aircraft are employed on maritime patrol and search and rescue missions. They are capable of landing on the short, rough, gravel airstrips common in the Arctic.
C-143A
A single Challenger 604 aircraft was acquired by the United States Coast Guard in December 2005 as its new medium-range command-and-control aircraft.

Built from 1996 through 2006, over 360 were delivered. Early ones were selling for $4.0–$4.5 million and late models for less than $8 million in 2016. With 27,000 to 27,100 lb (12,200 to 12,300 kg) operating empty weights, it carries six or seven passengers and full fuel with the increased MTOW. It is able to cruise for 7.5–8.0 hrs at Mach 0.80 and to fly five passengers 4,000 nm at Mach 0.74 up to FL 410.

Thrust lapse as altitude increases, hefty power, and wing loadings affects hot-and-high performance. It takes off in 3,500 to 4,000 ft (1,100 to 1,200 m) for under 800 nmi (1,500 km; 920 mi) missions, in 5,684 ft (1,732 m) at MTOW and sea level. In 9,123 ft (2,781 m) at ISA+20C and 5,000 ft (1,500 m) altitudes, TOW is reduced to 47,535 lb (21,562 kg) to meet climb requirements.

Pro Line 4 avionics include six 7.25 in (18.4 cm) cathode-ray tubes and dual Flight management systems. It burns 3,800 lb (1,700 kg) in the first hour, 3,200 lb (1,500 kg) in the second hour, 2,800 lb (1,300 kg) in the third hour then 2,000 lb (910 kg)/hr. Scheduled maintenance is done every 200 h or six months, and major inspections are made every 96 months, and includes $110,000 landing-gear overhauls, the 8,729 lbf (38.83 kN) CF34-3B turbofans cost $375 per engine per hour.

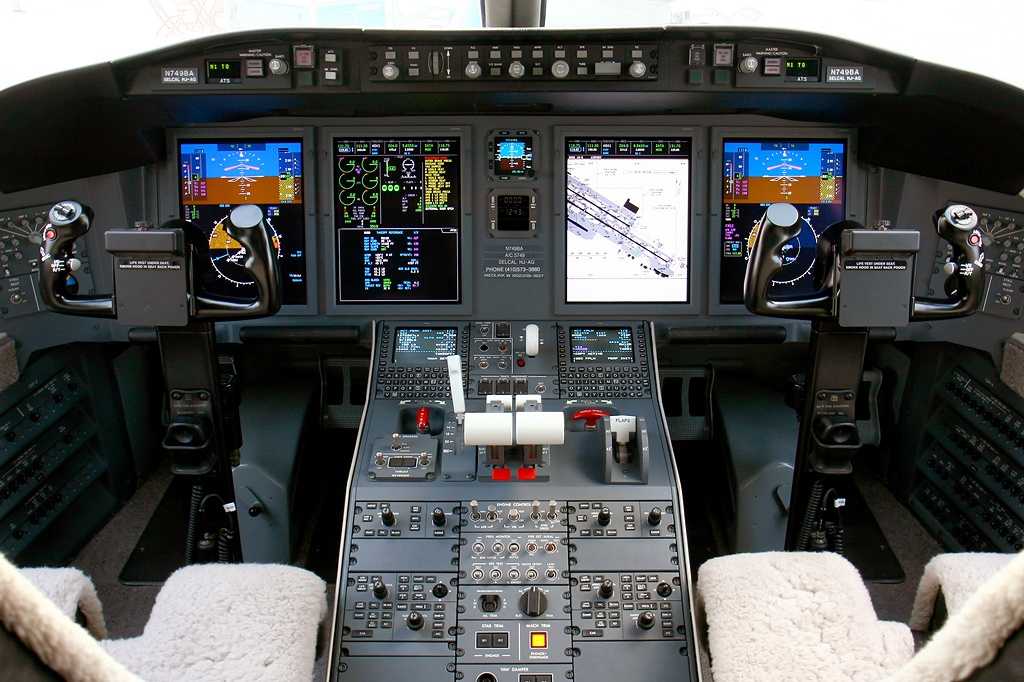
The 605 flight deck has the Pro Line 21 avionics system with electronic flight bag capability and even larger screens.

CL-605
Following a first flight in January 2006, the Challenger 605 was certified and introduced in early 2006. Compared to the Challenger 604, the airframe was updated with larger cabin windows and a new tail cone, and the flight deck was updated with the Collins Pro Line 21 system with electronic flight bag capability. The 200th Challenger 605 entered service in October 2012.
CL-605 MSA
A maritime patrol aircraft design under development by Boeing. Boeing has proposed a repackaging of some of the Boeing P-8 Poseidon sensors but not weapons into a less expensive airframe, the Bombardier Challenger 605 business jet. This aircraft is named Maritime Surveillance Aircraft (MSA) and has been depicted with the AN/APY-10 radar, an electro-optical sensor in a retractable turret, and a magnetic anomaly detector. In February 2014, a MSA demonstrator, which is a modified CL-604, made its first flight. The final aircraft will use the CL-605 airframe. The demonstrator currently has the external shapes for the sensors and communications systems which will be added later. The final MSA is expected to cost $55 million to $60 million per aircraft.

The 605 and 650 improve the avionics and cabin, but their performance figures are similar to the 604.

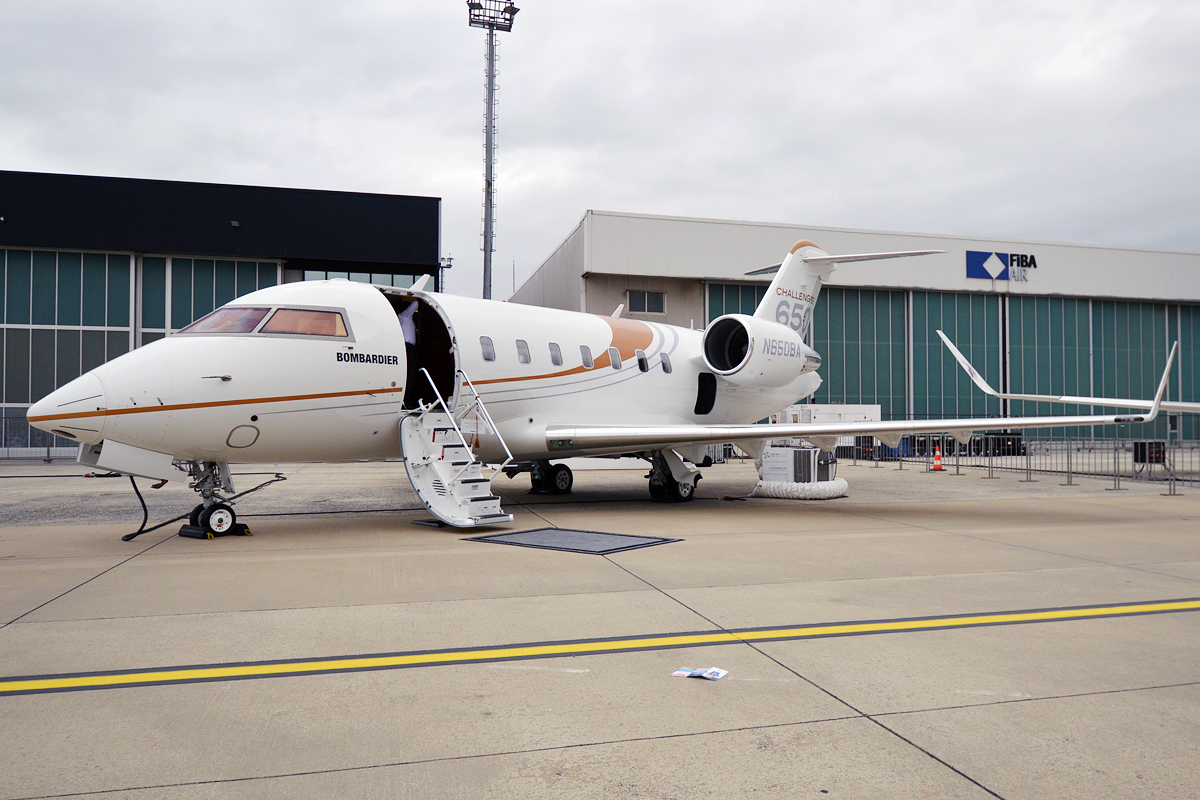
A Bombardier Challenger 650

=== Challenger 650 ===
Challenger 650
Following a first flight in 2015, the Challenger 650 was certified and introduced in 2015. Compared to the Challenger 605, it has a redesigned interior cabin, Rockwell Collins Pro Line 21 Advanced avionics, similar to the Challenger 350, Synthetic vision system (SVS) and a 5% increase in takeoff thrust. In 2023, its equipped price was $33M.

== Operators ==
The 500th unit was rolled out in May 2000. The 1000th, a 650, was delivered to NetJets in December 2015. Including the Challenger 300 and Challenger 850, the 1,600 Bombardier Challengers in-service had logged 7.3 million hours and over 4.3 million flights by early 2017. As of December 2017, close to 1,100 Challenger 600 Series have been delivered. By October 2018, the global Challenger fleet amounted to 997: of these, 611 were based in North America, 151 in Europe, 93 in Latin America, 78 in Asia-Pacific, 37 in Africa and 23 in Middle East.

=== Military and government operators ===
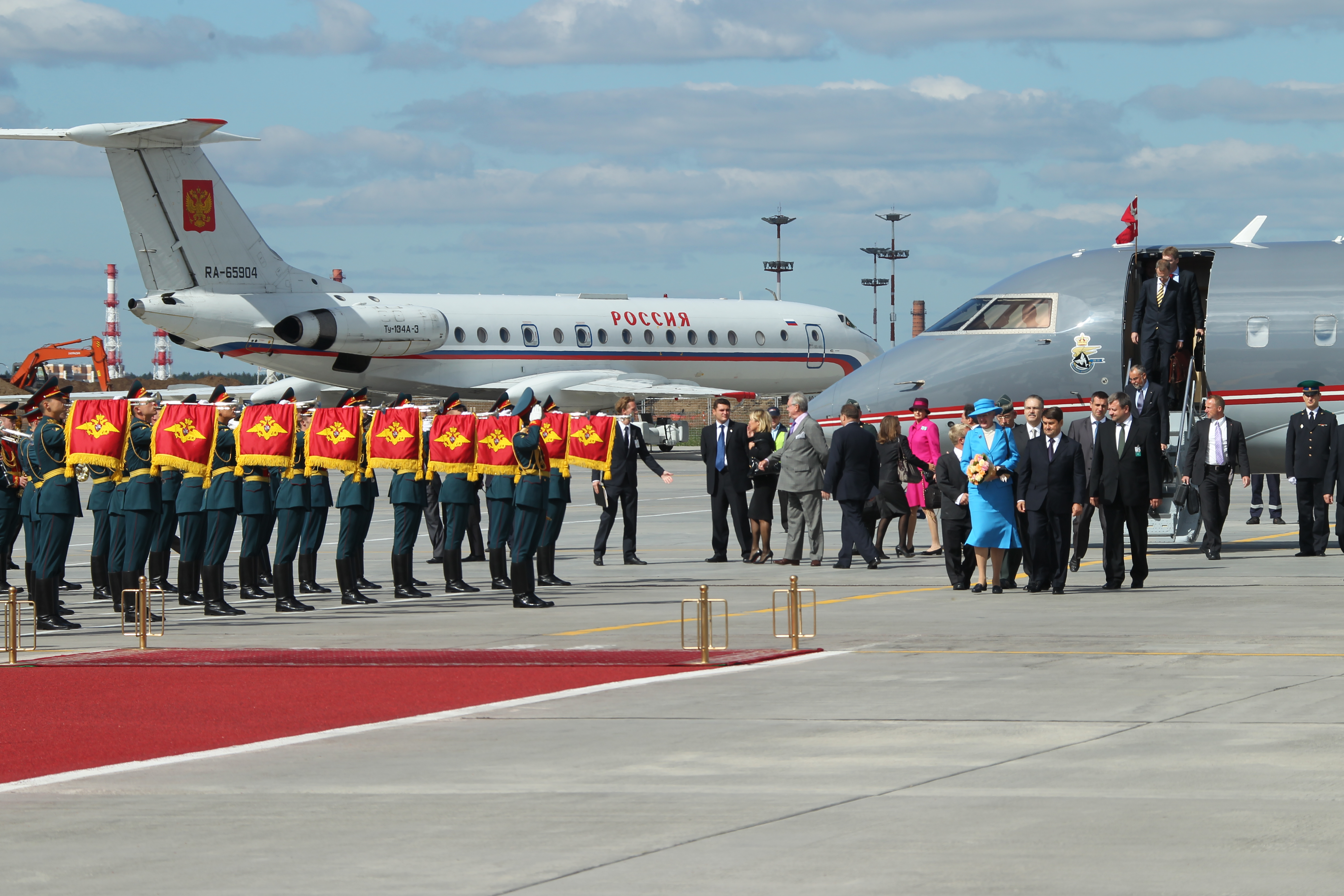
Royal Danish Air Force welcomed by a Russian Army Orchestra

Challenger 650 ARTEMIS used by the United States Army, seen in 2021

Finland

- Finnish Border Guard: two Challenger 650 ordered in 2024

Switzerland

- Swiss Air Force: Two CL-604 bought from REGA for air-ambulance duties.

United Arab Emirates

- United Arab Emirates Air Force: 1 Challenger 650 ordered in February 2019.

United States

- United States Army: 2 Challenger 650 'ARTEMIS' ISTAR introduced 2020
- United States Coast Guard: 1 CL-604 (retired 2011) designated as the C-143A Medium Range Command and Control Aircraft (MRC2A), provided VIP transport for high-ranking members of the Department of Homeland Security and U.S. Coast Guard
- FAA / United States Air Force: 3 Challenger CL-600 Jets designated C-143B owned by the FAA and jointly operated with the USAF

=== Civilian operators ===
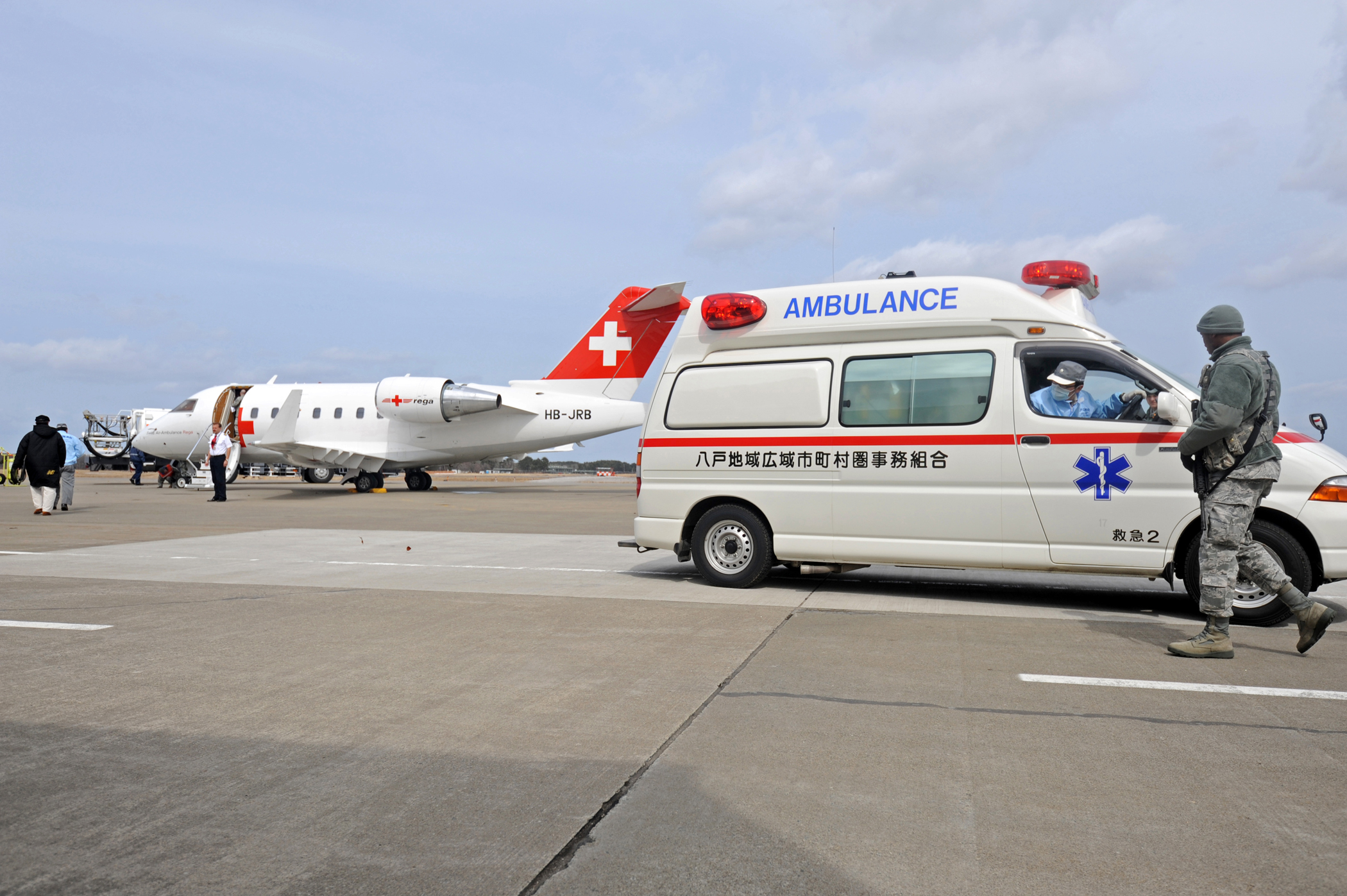
Medical evacuation after the 2011 Tōhoku disaster by Rega

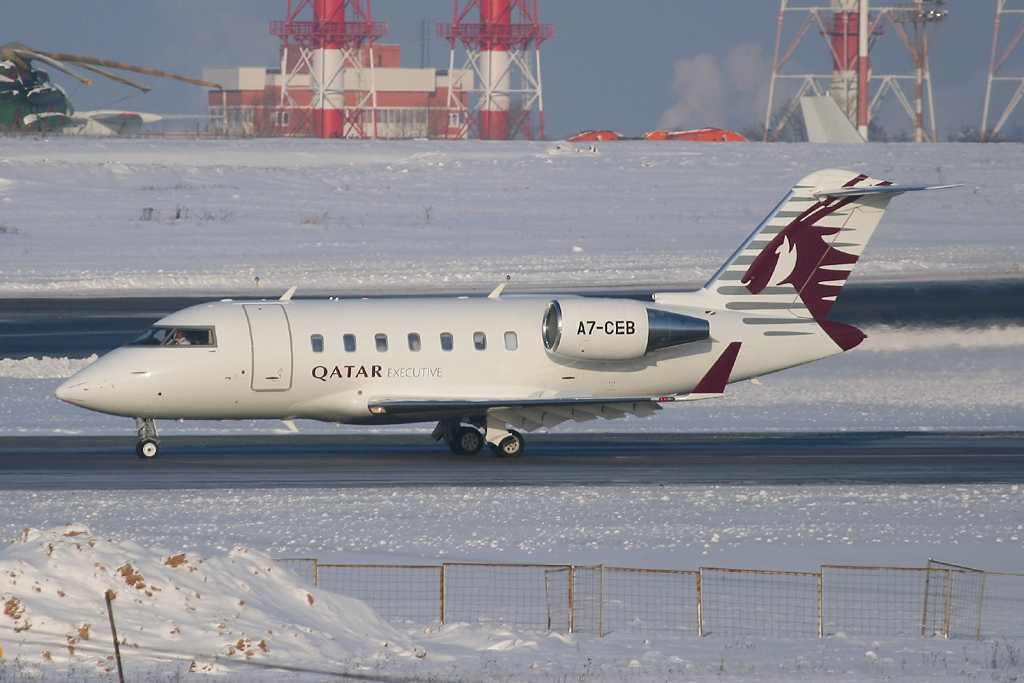
Qatar Executive

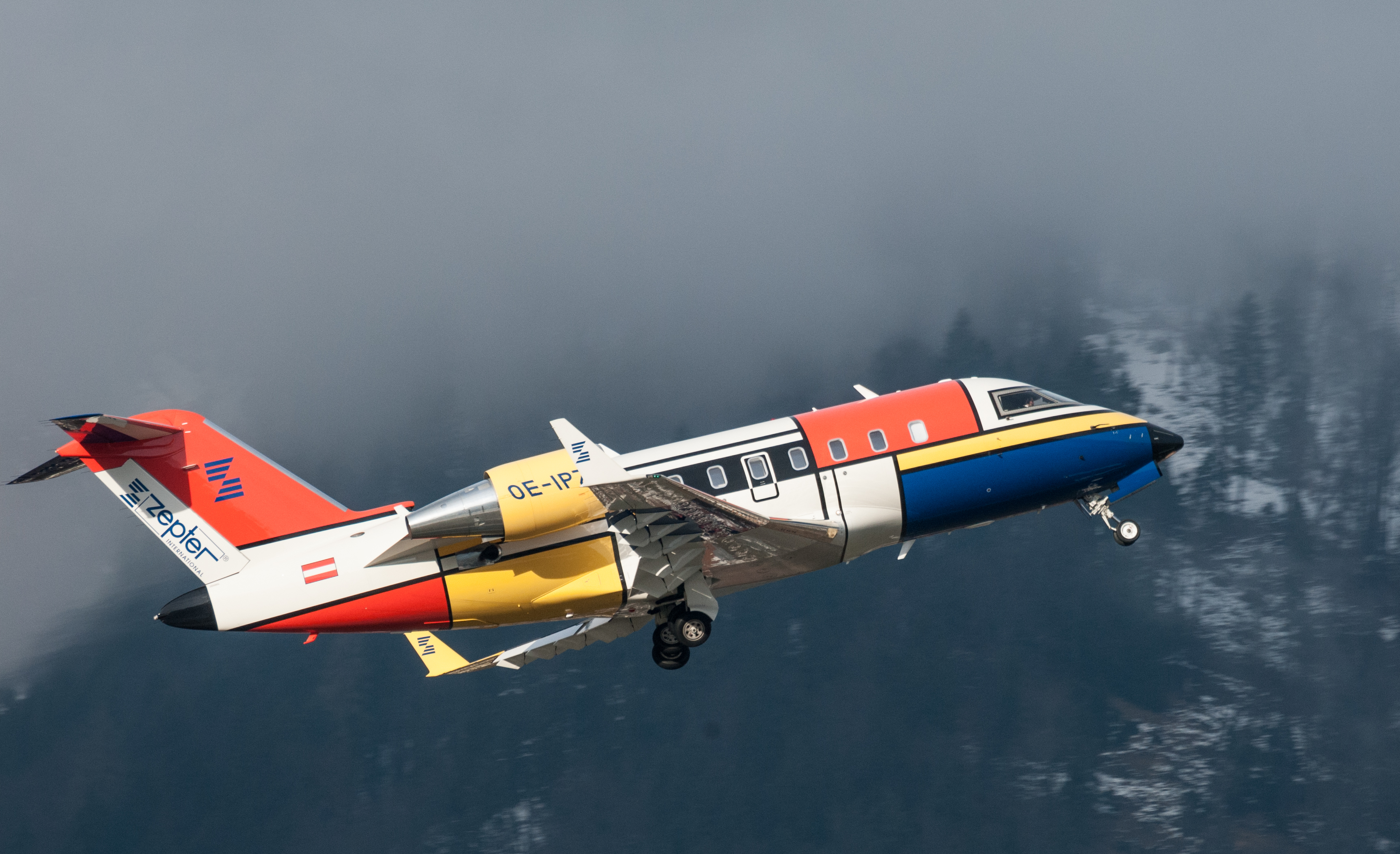
Zepter International

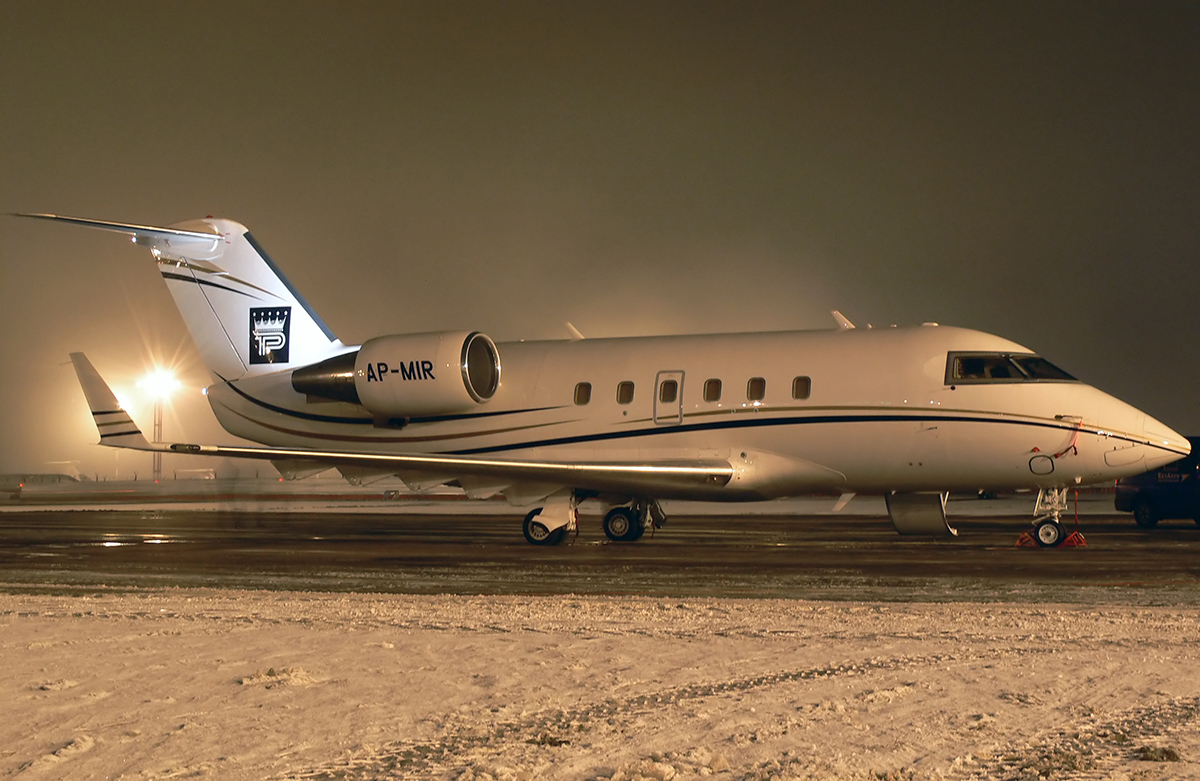
Princely Jets

Canada

- VIH Execujet: operates one CL604.

India

- Gujarat operates one CL650 for state executive travel.

Pakistan

- ASSL Air: operates one CL-605

Turkmenistan

- Turkmenistan Airlines for government VIPs. Operates two CL-605's

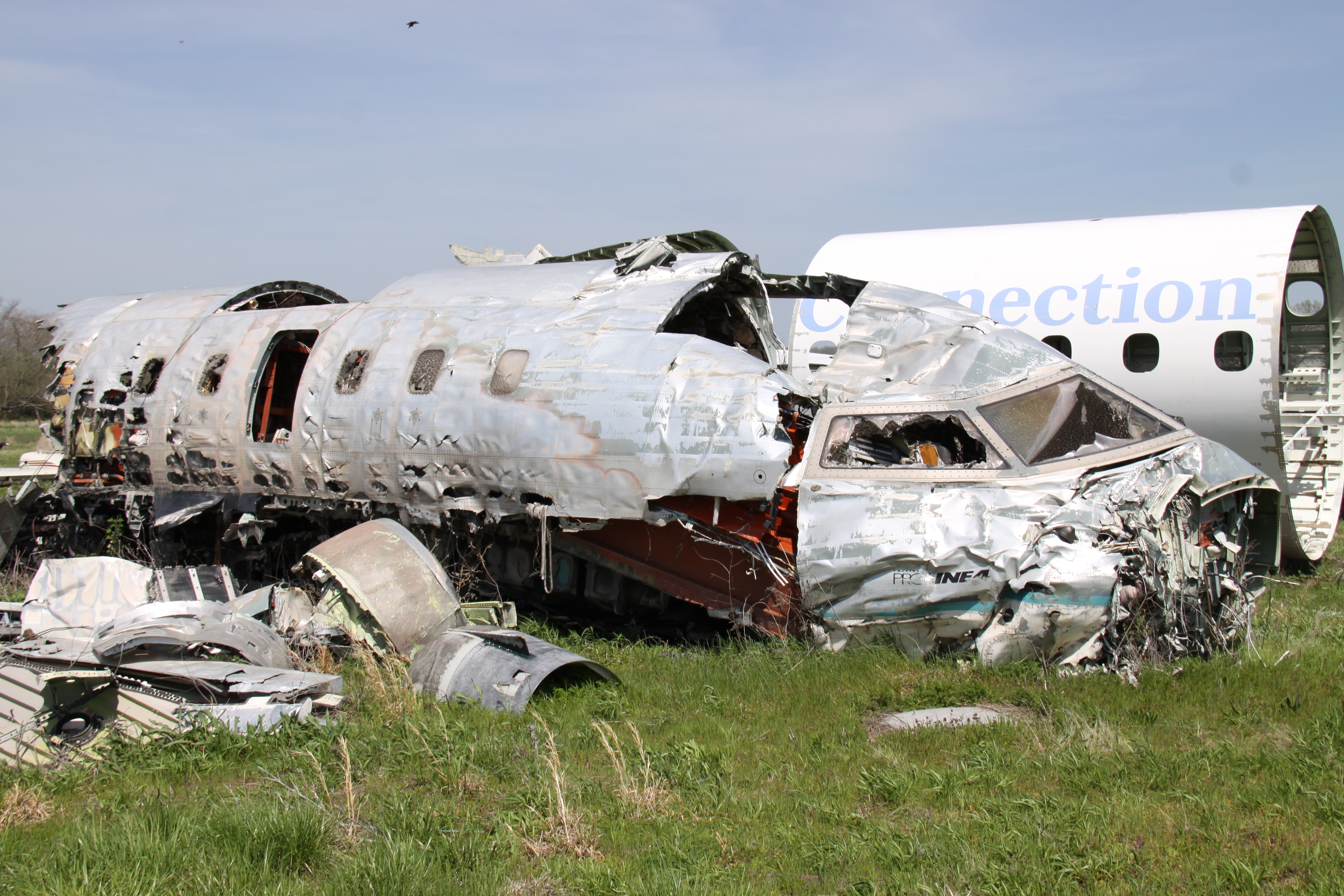
Wichita Airport 2000 crash remains

== Incidents and accidents ==
By May 2019, the Challenger fleet suffered 18 hull loss accidents, causing 39 fatalities.

Date	Location	Variant	Fat.	Surv.	Notes
2000-10-10	United States, Kansas, Wichita Airport	CL-600-2B16 Challenger 604	3	0	Test flight, impact with terrain during initial climb and post impact fire
2002-01-04	United Kingdom, Birmingham International Airport	CL-600-2B16 Challenger 604	5	0	Rolled rapidly on takeoff and caught fire
2004-11-28	United States, Colorado, Montrose Airport	CL-600-2A12	3	3	Crashed during an attempted takeoff due to icing on airframe. Longtime NBC television executive and former Saturday Night Live executive producer Dick Ebersol and his son, entrepreneur and filmmaker Charlie Ebersol, were two of the survivors
2005-11-11	United Kingdom, London Heathrow	CL-600-2B16 Challenger 604	0	5	Autopilot pitch trim failed and stabiliser trim system failed due to electrical shorting, caused by fault in the design of the Horizontal Stabiliser Trim Control Unit
2014-01-05	United States, Colorado, Aspen Airport	CL-600-2B16 Challenger 601-3R	1	2	Pilot error crash after tailwind landing in low-level windshear and gust conditions after a go-around.
2017-01-07	Oman, above Muscat	CL-600-2B16 Challenger 604	0	9	9,000 ft altitude loss after passing through the wake turbulence from an Airbus A380, written off due to damage after emergency landing
2018-03-11	Iran, Zagros Mountains	CL-600-2B16 Challenger 604	11	0	Crashed after a partial instrument failure, leading to a loss of control Main article: 2018 Iran Bombardier Challenger crash
2019-05-05	Mexico, Coahuila	CL-600-2B16 Challenger 601-3A	13	0	Crashed on its return from Las Vegas, Nevada Main article: 2019 Coahuila Bombardier Challenger crash
2021-07-26	United States, California, Truckee Tahoe	CL-600-2B16 Challenger 605	6	0	Crashed on approach
2022-01-31	United Kingdom, London Stansted Airport	CL-600-2B16 Challenger 604	0	6	During a crosswind, plane made a hard landing, left wingtip hit the runway several times. The nose landing gear failed when the stick pusher activated. There were no injuries.
2022-12-30	Mexico, near Venado, San Luis Potosí	CL-600S Challenger 600	2	0	Aircraft lost after experiencing uncontrolled descent during positioning flight and "apparently disintegrated"
2024-02-09	United States, Florida, near Naples Airport	CL-600-2B16 Challenger 604	2	3	Experienced dual engine failure short of the runway; the pilots attempted to land on Interstate 75, the aircraft was destroyed and consumed by a post-crash fire. Main article: Hop-A-Jet Flight 823
2026-01-25	United States, Maine, Bangor International Airport	CL-600-2B16 Challenger 650	6	0	Crashed during takeoff Main article: 2026 Bangor Bombardier Challenger 650 crash

== Specifications (Challenger 650) ==
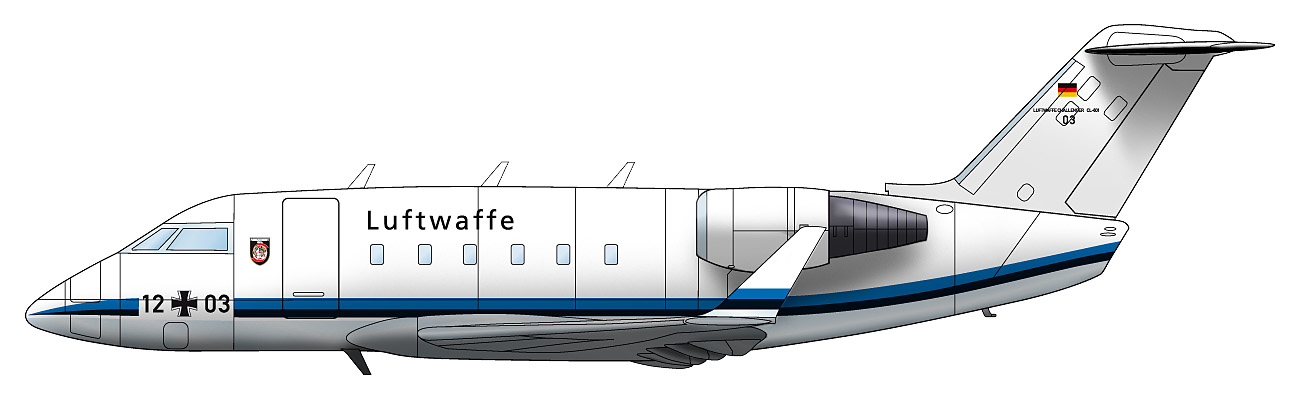
Side view

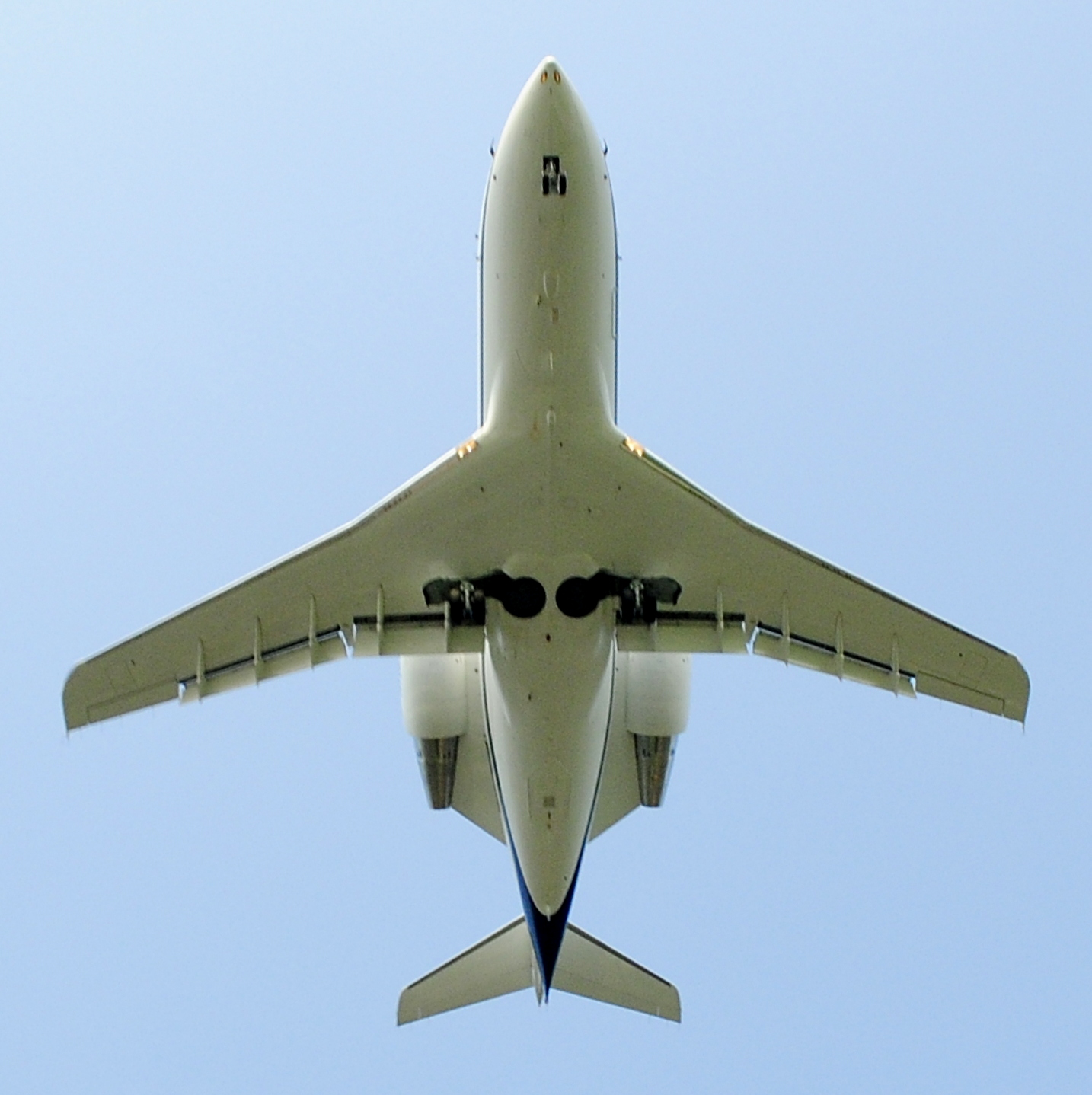
Planform view

Data from Bombardier.

General characteristics

- Crew: Two (captain and first officer)
- Capacity: 2,200 kg (4,850 lb) and up to 19 passengers
- Length: 20.85 m (68 ft 5 in)
- Wingspan: 19.61 m (64 ft 4 in)
- Height: 6.30 m (20 ft 8 in)
- Wing area: 45.4 m^{2} (489 sq ft)
- Aspect ratio: 8.46
- Empty weight: 12,315 kg (27,150 lb)
- Max takeoff weight: 21,863 kg (48,200 lb)
- Fuel capacity: 9,072 kg (20,000 lb)
- Cabin: 1.83 m (6 ft) high, 2.41 m (7 ft 11 in) wide
- Powerplant: 2 × General Electric CF34-3B turbofans, 41.0 kN (9,220 lbf) thrust each

Performance

- Maximum speed: Mach 0.85
- Range: 7,400 km (4,600 mi, 4,000 nmi)
- Service ceiling: 12,000 m (41,000 ft)
- Thrust/weight: 0.38
- Takeoff: 1,720 m (5,640 ft) (SL, ISA, MTOW)
- Landing: 732 m (2,402 ft) (SL, ISA, typical)

== See also ==
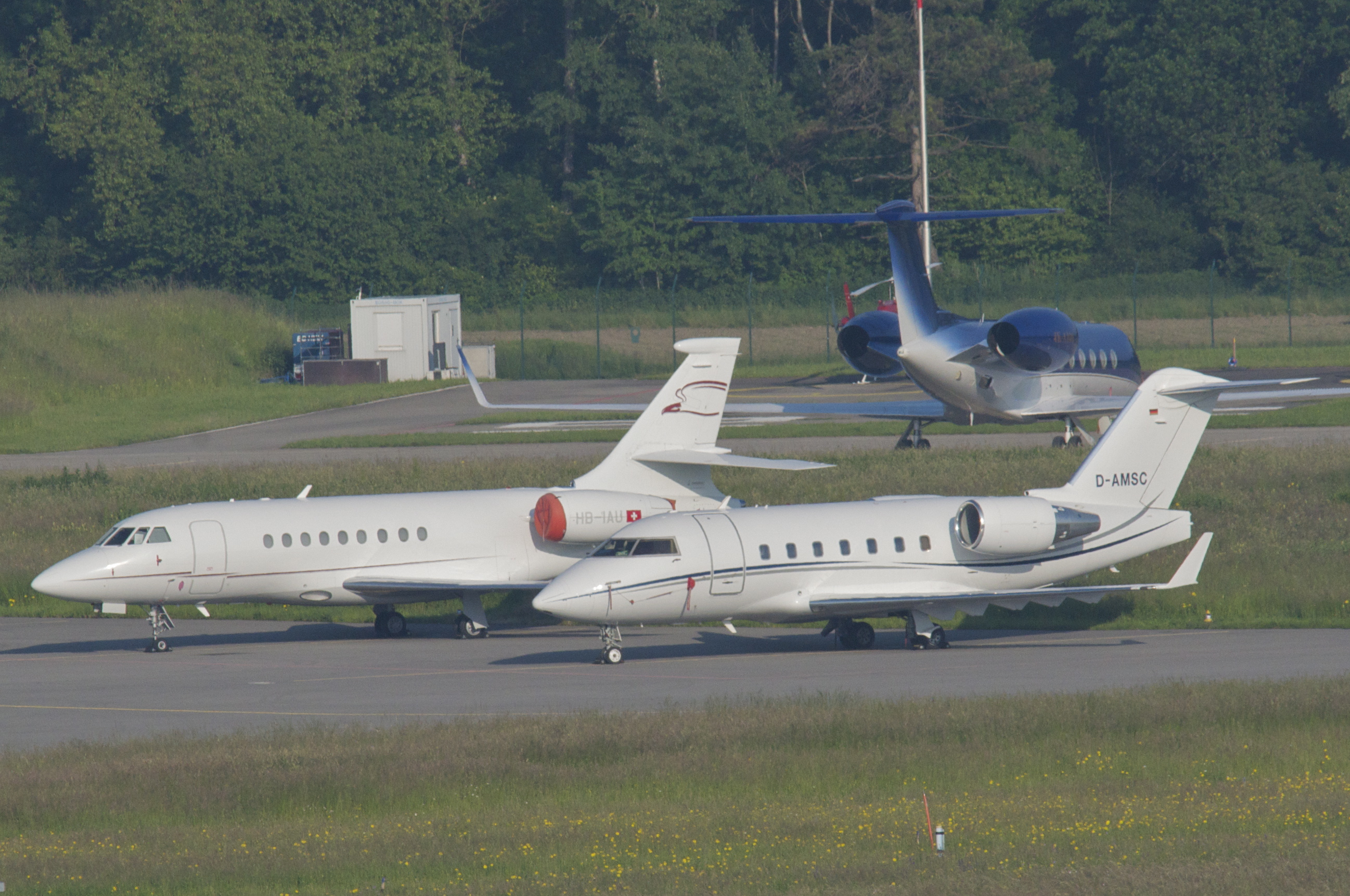
Side by side with a Falcon 2000

Related development

- CRJ100/200
- Global Express
- Challenger 800
- Challenger 300

Aircraft of comparable role, configuration, and era

- Dassault Falcon 2000
- Embraer Legacy 600
