= 2019 Coahuila Bombardier Challenger crash =

Aircraft crash caused by turbulence

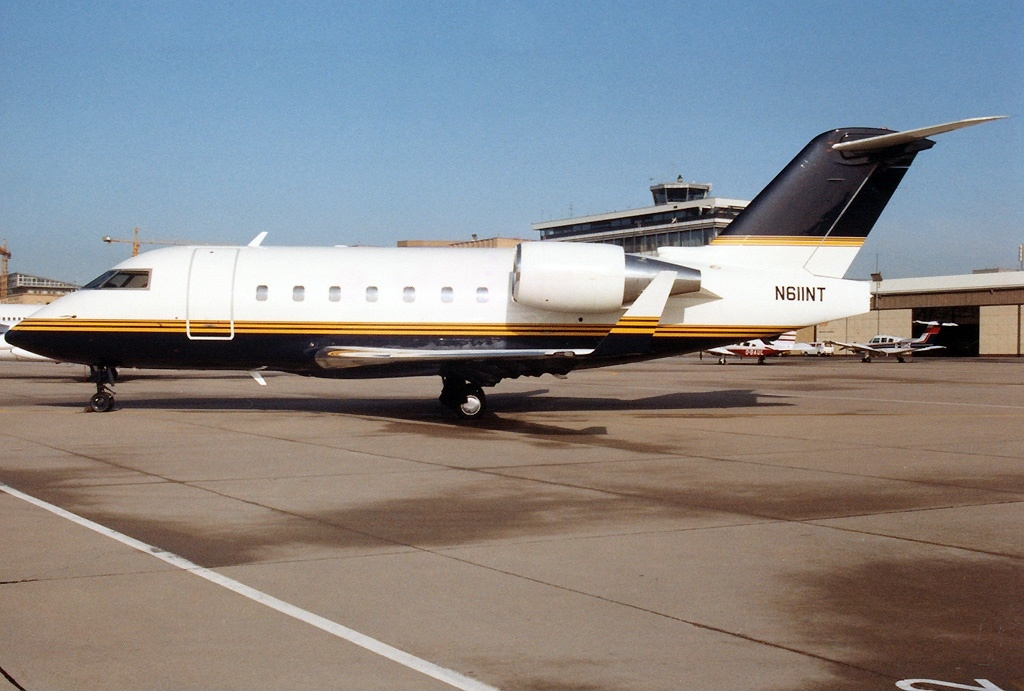
- A Bombardier Challenger similar to the aircraft

Occurrence
- Date: 5 May 2019
- Summary: Loss of control during severe turbulence
- Site: NW of Monclova, Coahuila, Mexico

Aircraft
- Aircraft type: Canadair CL-600-2B16 Challenger 601-3A
- Aircraft name: Bombardier Challenger 601-3A
- Operator: Compañía de Aviación y Logística Empresarial
- Registration: N601VH
- Flight origin: Las Vegas, Nevada
- Destination: Monterrey, Mexico
- Occupants: 13
- Passengers: 11
- Crew: 2
- Fatalities: 13
- Survivors: 0

On 5 May 2019 a Bombardier Challenger 601-3A crashed near Monclova, Coahuila in Mexico after losing control in severe turbulence. All 13 people on board were killed.

== Accident ==
The plane took off from Las Vegas with passengers reportedly returning from attending a boxing match on the afternoon of 5 May 2019 and was to land at Monterrey, northeastern Mexico. However, air traffic controllers lost contact with the aircraft over Coahuila. Contact with the aircraft was lost about 150 nm (280 km) from the northern Mexican city of Monclova. The plane subsequently crashed into terrain and all 13 occupants were killed.

According to Aviation Safety Network, the crew had been approved permission to climb to FL390. Nine minutes later the aircraft entered the green zone of the weather system, which caused the turbulence to increase with vertical acceleration values ranging between 1.40 and 0.68 g. The crew then requested to climb to FL410, which was the maximum certified operating altitude for the aircraft. This request was also approved by Monterrey International Airport. The aircraft entered the core of the most intense part of the weather system where turbulence began to become more severe and soon got to higher altitudes, rolled and nose dived. It then impacted terrain at an elevation of 1088 m.

== Cause ==
According to the Federal Civil Aviation Agency, the accident was caused by “a loss of control due to a rapid climb and inversion caused by severe atmospheric instability, inducing both engines to shut down” and "inability of the aircraft’s [weather] radar to provide information for an undetermined reason.”
