= Letter of comfort (contract law) =

Letter to express willingness to enter into a contract

A letter of comfort, sometimes called a "letter of intent", is a communication from a party to a contract to the other party that indicates an initial willingness to enter into a contractual obligation absent the elements of a legally enforceable contract. The objective is to create a morally binding but not legally binding assurance.

Generally, a letter of comfort is drafted only in vague terms, to avoid creating enforceable contract terms. Few nations regulate letters of comfort by statute; whether a letter of comfort creates legally enforceable contractual terms is often determined only by courts of law, based solely on the wording of the document. Despite their nonbinding status, letters of comfort nonetheless provide risk mitigation because the parent company is putting its own reputation in jeopardy.

In international contracts, letters of comfort are often used to assure a contracting party that a parent corporation will provide its subsidiary with the necessary resources to fulfill the contract. However, under both international and European Union law, a letter of comfort does not require the parent corporation to fulfill the obligations incurred by its subsidiary. When used to provide support for a subsidiary's actions, a letter of comfort usually consists of three terms:

- A statement from the parent organization acknowledging that its subsidiary has entered into a contract.
- A promise that the parent organization will not sever its legal relationship with the subsidiary until contractual terms are satisfied.
- A statement of comfort (e.g., "it is our policy" or "it is our intention") indicating how far the parent organization will go to support the subsidiary in fulfilling its contractual terms.

Canada recognizes two types of letters of comfort. The weaker version, in which a parent organization acknowledges that a subsidiary has entered into a contract but which provides no assurance of intention, is called a letter of awareness. The stronger version, the letter of comfort, indicates the parent organization's intention to support the subsidiary. In the United States, there is a general presumption against the enforceability of letters of comfort. However, depending on the wording of the document, there may be legal liability under the rule of reliance.
