= City and Westminster Properties (1934) Ltd v Mudd =

English contract law case

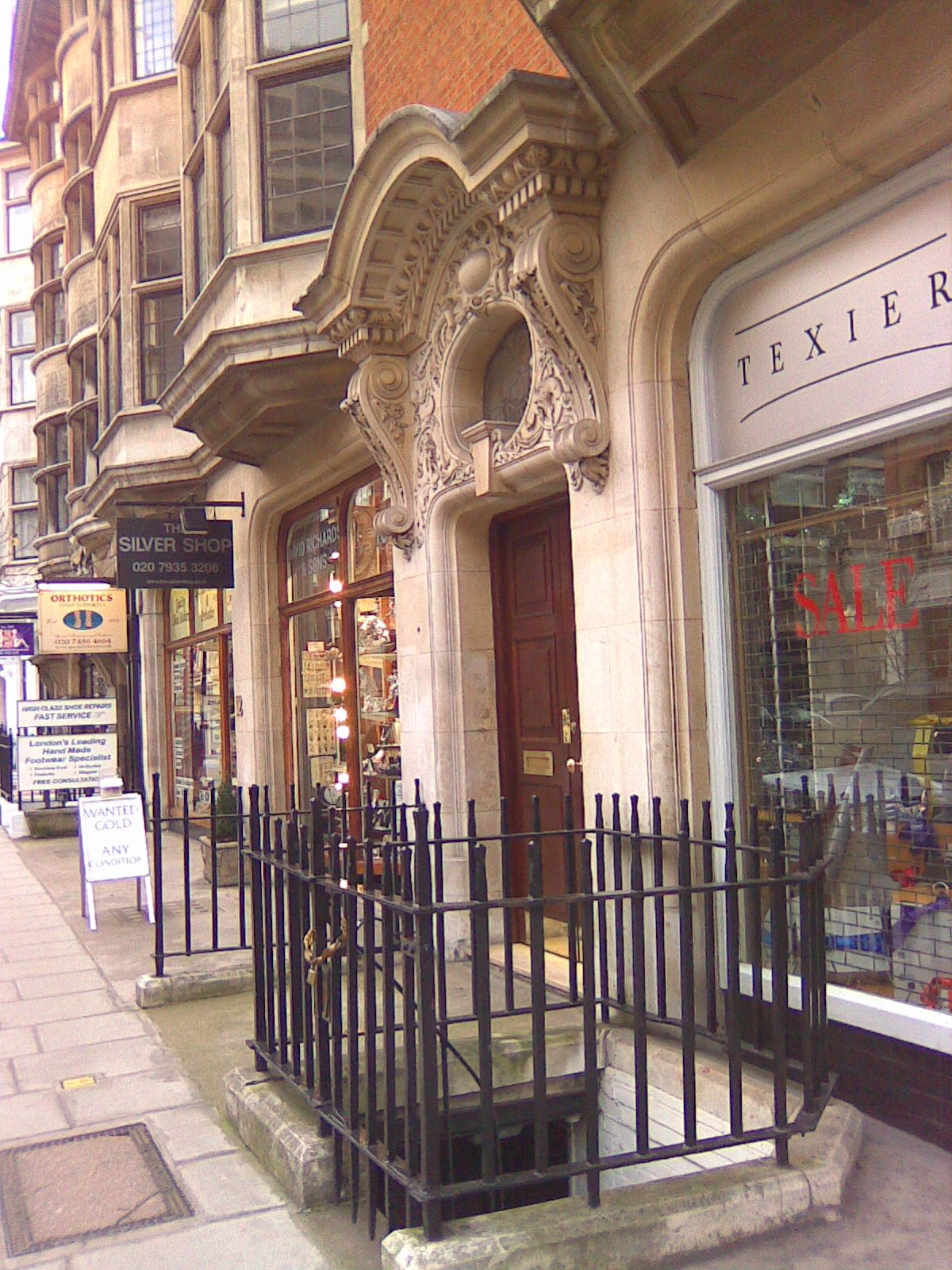
- 4 New Cavendish Street, London, location of controversy.
- Court: High Court
- Citation: [1959] Ch 129

Case opinions
- Harman J

Keywords
- Collateral contract, estoppel

City and Westminster Properties (1934) Ltd v Mudd [1959] Ch 129 is an English contract law case, regarding the parol evidence rule. It illustrates one of the large exceptions, that a written document is not deemed to be exhaustive of the parties' intentions when there is clear evidence of a collateral contract. It shows that even evidence from outside a written agreement may contradict evidence inside it.

== Facts ==
The lease said the tenant could use No 4 New Cavendish Street, London, for business purposes only. Mr Mudd, the tenant was an antique dealer. He had been assured he could live in the back room of the shop and using the basement a living space as a wartime arrangement since 1941. The written agreements followed from 1943 and excluded using the premises to live since 1947. In 1957, after some changes of landlord and caution of surveyors, the new landlord tried to eject Mr Mudd. Mr Mudd refused to leave and was brought to court.

Counsel for the landlord (City and Westminster Properties) argued that reasonable notice was being given and therefore it could not fall within the High Trees case. Mr Mudd had no right to remain.

== Judgment ==
Harman J held that there was a collateral contract that he could stay even if it contradicted the written agreement's express terms. He said there was no need to look at the question of estoppel, because there was a clear assurance preceding the contract.

The first question to be answered is that of construction. The words on which the plaintiffs rely are those at the beginning of clause 2 (9), "to use the demised premises as and for showrooms workrooms and offices only," and it is argued that the plain meaning of these words is that no other use is to be made of the premises. It is said that this interpretation is affirmed by the rest of the clause which further cuts down the user by prohibiting a large number of trades or businesses. In my judgment, on the question of construction it is not permissible to look into the past history of the matter, nor to rely on the fact that the defendant had been living on the premises to the knowledge of the plaintiffs, nor even that he intended to continue to do so; nor, in my judgment, can the fact be called in aid that express words of prohibition as to residence had appeared in the draft and did not appear in the lease as executed. In commercial cases where printed forms are used, attention has been paid to words struck out. This method of construction had, I believe, the great authority of Scrutton L.J. There is an instance of it in Caffin v Aldridge That was a commercial cause where the court had to construe the word "cargo," and they could see on the face of the document that before the word "cargo" there had been the words "full and complete" and these had been struck through. Lord Esher M.R. said this:

"In order to see what it meant, one must look at the rest of the document. We find that the words 'full and complete,' which were originally in the printed form, had been struck out."

Lopes L.J. also said:

"The words 'full and complete' were erased; and that could only, I think, have been done for the purpose of showing that such was not the intention."

Kay L.J. did not allude to that matter. Whether this be legitimate, I take leave to doubt: for example in Inglis v Buttery (1878) 3 App.Cas. 552 again a commercial case, the House of Lords held that neither letters of the parties before the contract was signed nor deleted words in the contract could be considered for the purpose of interpreting the intention of the parties. Lord Hatherley LC said this:

"Nor can I think, and I believe your Lordships will concur with me in this opinion, that it is legitimate to look at those words which appear upon the face of the agreement with a line drawn through them, and which are expressly, by the intention of all the parties to the agreement, deleted, that is to say, done away with, and wholly abolished. It is not legitimate to read them and to use them as bearing upon the meaning of that which has become the real contract between the parties, namely, the final arrangement of the document which we must now proceed to construe."

At any rate, in my judgment, that method of construction must be confined to commercial cases where the words struck out appear on the face of the signed document and cannot be extended to looking at words which appear in a draft.

All these matters which I have mentioned are not, in my judgment, surrounding circumstances which can be called in aid to construe the language used. On the other hand, the nature of the property (that is to say, whether it was obviously a dwelling-house or adapted to be used as such) are matters to be taken into consideration. This is shown by the recent case of Levermore v Jobey, where at the end of the headnote I find these words:

"Per curiam. In construing a lease for the purpose of deciding whether it effects a letting of a dwelling-house the court is not precluded from looking at the subject-matter of the lease, namely, the property let, to ascertain whether it is or is not adapted for living purposes."

Jenkins L.J. says this: The first thing to be done, therefore, in the present case is to look at the terms of the lease. For the purpose of construing the lease ... it is permissible for the court, and indeed obligatory on it, to pay regard to the surrounding circumstances with reference to which the lease was entered into, and in particular to look at the nature of the subject-matter of the letting."

My attention was called not only to this case but to another in which covenants not unlike those before me have recently been construed by the court. The earlier case is R v Brighton and Area Rent Tribunal. That was a case under the Rent Restrictions Acts, the question being whether a shop with a self-contained flat over it ought to be classed as a dwelling-house. The covenant in question was that the tenant would not permit the premises to be used otherwise than for the business of a greengrocer, and it was held that so long as he carried on a greengrocer's business there he was not in breach of covenant, though he lived on the property. Lord Goddard CJ in a reserved judgment, after quoting the covenant, said:

"The rule with regard to the construction of such a covenant is conveniently stated in Foa's Landlord and Tenant, 7th ed., p. 111, and as we think that the passage accurately states the law we will quote it instead of setting out the various cases which deal with this point: 'A covenant, like any other contract, is to be construed according to the intent of the parties as expressed by their own words, and by regard to the whole of the instrument, and the surrounding circumstances of the case, it being also a rule that if the words be doubtful, that construction is to be taken which is most strong against the covenantor.' Bearing that in mind, it is in our opinion impossible to construe this covenant so as to prohibit the tenant from living on the premises. Provided that the tenant carries on a greengrocer's business it would in our opinion be impossible, and, indeed, absurd to say that he was in breach of his covenant because he lived on the premises. So to hold would mean that the whole of the upper part was sterilized, at least to the extent that the rooms could only be used as a store or for some such purpose, and not for that for which they were designed which the tenant is under covenant to preserve and not to alter."

The Lord Chief Justice relied largely, as will be seen, on the fact that to hold that residence was a breach would be in effect to sterilize a large part of the property and prevent it from being used for the purposes for which it was designed. To the like effect is Levermore v Jobey, already cited, where the question was similar to that in the case above cited. Here again, the covenant was construed, having regard to the nature of the demised property, not to prevent user by residence. These cases, of course, turned upon the particular words used and the surrounding circumstances; and both are here different. If the demised property consists in part of trade premises and in part of living quarters, it is natural to give the covenant a meaning which confines its operation to the trade portion and does not make the rest of the property unusable. This shop and basement are not, on the face of it, suitable for a dwelling-house. They constitute in effect one of four lock-up shops. They are adapted for shopkeeping. Consequently, when I find a covenant to use for showrooms, workrooms and offices only, coupled with a restriction covering a wide area of trades, it appears to me that this clearly means that the property is to be used for trade purposes only and then only for certain trades, and that to use the property as a dwelling-house is a clear breach of covenant. On this point, therefore, I am of opinion that the plaintiffs succeed.

I must next deal with the issue of rectification. The defendant sought to have inserted a proviso expressly allowing him to reside on the premises. Now, according to his evidence, which I accept on this point, this was the very request which he made to Jones on the telephone in December, 1947, and which Jones categorically refused, being under the impression this would be a breach of the covenants of the head-lease. The defendant argued that both sides did in fact intend that the defendant should be allowed to reside; but even if that be so, there was clearly no common intention to insert such a provision in the lease, for the very clear reason that the plaintiffs wished to avoid the mischief of the Rent Restrictions Acts. The plea of rectification therefore fails.

The next issue is that of waiver. Now residence, contrary to the covenants of the lease, is a continuing breach and therefore prima facie it is only waived by the acceptance of rent down to the date of that acceptance and there is a new breach immediately thereafter which is not waived. My attention was called to a number of cases which show that acts of waiver may be so continuous that the court is driven to the conclusion that there has been a new agreement for letting or a licence or a release of the covenant. The cases cited on this subject show acquiescence continuing for a very long period of years. For instance, in Gibson v Doeg the period was 20 years, in Gibbon v Payne it was 40 years, and in Hepworth v Pickles 24 years. In the more recent case of Lloyds Bank v Jones, Singleton L.J. points out that no particular period such as 20 years is required. Morris L.J. says this:

"The judge in his judgment held that the conduct of the landlords in standing by from May 23, 1934, until January 31, 1951, without protest at the respondent's non-residence on the holding constituted waiver, or release of, or acquiescence in, the respondent's breach of clause 15, and that the landlords were now estopped from alleging that the respondent had committed a breach of clause 15. On the admitted facts I cannot see that any implication arises that the landlords agreed that they would never again insist on full performance of clause 15. It may well be that if they accepted rent with knowledge they waived breaches of covenant from time to time, but I can see no reason why they should be prevented from demanding proper compliance as from the date they required it. There may be conduct from which can be implied the waiver or abandonment of a right. I do not think that the landlords so conducted themselves that they could not assert that clause 15 should be honoured. There was no reason why after the death of Mrs. Minnie Bach they should not say that, though they had not been insisting upon the full and strict compliance with the covenant in clause 15 in the past, they proposed to require compliance for the future. The present case differs on its facts from such cases as Gibson v Doeg and Hepworth v Pickles. It could not here be said that a judge or a jury could infer from the landlords' conduct and the admitted facts that the landlords had given some form of irrevocable licence, or some form of release, which had the effect that the covenant in clause 15 could not in the future be regarded as effective and subsisting."

Again, in Wolfe v Hogan I find this in the headnote:

The mere acceptance of rent by the landlord from the tenant, after he had knowledge of the change of user by the tenant, though it continues for some time, does not, by itself, constitute such acceptance by the landlord of the changed position as to show that the house has been let as a separate dwelling

And Denning LJ, after dealing with the facts, says this:

"A house or a part of a house originally let for business purposes does not become let for dwelling purposes unless it can be inferred from the acceptance of rent that the landlord has affirmatively consented to the change of user. Let me illustrate that from the common law doctrine as to waiver of forfeiture. A breach of covenant not to use premises in a particular way is a continuing breach. Any acceptance of rent by the landlord, after knowledge, only waives the breaches up to the time of the acceptance of rent. It does not waive the continuance of the breach thereafter and, notwithstanding his previous acceptance of rent, the landlord can still proceed for forfeiture on that account. Indeed, in the case of a continuing breach, the acceptance of rent, after knowledge, is only a bar to a claim for forfeiture if it goes on for so long, or is accepted in such circumstances, that it can be inferred that the landlord has not merely waived the breach but has affirmatively consented to the tenant continuing to use the premises as he has done."

I cannot think that anything proved here amounts to a release by the landlord of his rights. He knew, indeed, that the tenant was using the property to sleep in, but I do not think he knew more than that. At that he was willing to wink, but I am unable to find a release of the covenant or an agreement for a new letting. In my judgment, therefore, the plea of waiver fails.

There remains the so-called question of estoppel. This, in my judgment, is a misnomer and the present case does not raise the controversial issue of the Central London Property Trust Ltd v High Trees House Ltd decision. This is not a case of a representation made after contractual relations existed between the parties to the effect that one party to the contract would not rely on his rights. If the defendant's evidence is to be accepted, as I hold it is, it is a case of a promise made to him before the execution of the lease that, if he would execute it in the form put before him, the landlord would not seek to enforce against him personally the covenant about using the property as a shop only. The defendant says that it was in reliance on this promise that he executed the lease and entered on the onerous obligations contained in it. He says, moreover, that but for the promise made he would not have executed the lease, but would have moved to other premises available to him at the time. If these be the facts, there was a clear contract acted upon by the defendant to his detriment and from which the plaintiffs cannot be allowed to resile. The case is truly analogous to In re William Porter & Co Ltd. This is a decision of Simonds J, who said: "I come to the final point, the point which has given me difficulty in this case, and it is this." Then he states some of the facts which were very different from the facts here, but he goes on in this way: "It was an act intended to induce the company to take a certain course of action, to carry on its business, to enter into transactions and to incur obligations which, but for that resolution, it might not have done. It appears to me that there is some direct evidence here, and, in my judgment, I am entitled to apply the rule, stated nowhere better than in the old case of Cairncross v Lorimer This was a Scottish appeal to the House of Lords, where Lord Campbell L.C. said, after some observations which are not material to the present case: 'The doctrine will apply which is to be found, I believe, in the laws of all civilized nations, that if a man, either by words or by conduct, has intimated that he consents to an act which has been done, and that he will offer no opposition to it, although it could not have been lawfully done without his consent, and he thereby induces others to do that from which they otherwise might have abstained, he cannot question the legality of the act he had so sanctioned, to the prejudice of those who have so given faith to his words, or to the fair inference to be drawn from his conduct.' Also, a little further on: 'I am of opinion that, generally speaking, if a party having an interest to prevent an act being done has full notice of its having been done, and acquiesces in it, so as to induce a reasonable belief that he consents to it, and the position of others is altered by their giving credit to his sincerity, he has no more right to challenge the act, to their prejudice, than he would have had if it had been done by his previous licence.'" In my judgment, the defendant's evidence is to be accepted on this point. No alternative explanation of his change of mind between the beginning and the end of December, 1947, is available, and I think he was a witness of truth. His evidence was uncontradicted, for Jones remembered nothing about it.

The plea that this was a mere licence retractable at the plaintiffs' will does not bear examination. The promise was that so long as the defendant personally was tenant, so long would the landlords forbear to exercise the rights which they would have if he signed the lease. He did sign the lease on this promise and is therefore entitled to rely on it so long as he is personally in occupation of the shop.

The result is, that on this point the defence succeeds; and I propose to dismiss the action. I may add that if I had been of a different opinion, I should certainly have allowed the defendant relief against forfeiture under the Law of Property Act; but that, of course, would have been upon the footing that he ceased to reside or to sleep on the premises, which would have been a different result. I propose, therefore, to dismiss the counterclaim, the burden of which was rectification, a plea which failed.

== See also ==
- Allen v Pink (1838) 4 M&W 140, setting out the basic parol evidence rule
- Jacobs v Batavia & General Plantations Trust Ltd [1924] 1 Ch 287
- Government of Zanzibar v British Aerospace (Lancaster House) Ltd [2000] 1 WLR 2333, parties can explicitly contract to make the written document exhaustive, saying ‘this is the entire agreement’, etc.
- Angell v Duke (1875) 32 LT 320
- Henderson v Arthur [1907] 1 KB 10
- Business Environment Bow Lane Ltd v Deanwater Estates Ltd [2007] EWCA Civ 622

Exceptions where parol evidence is admissible

- Gillespie Bros & Co v Cheney, Eggar & Co [1986] 2 QB 59, to prove that terms need to be implied in the agreement
- Hutton v Warren (1836) 1 M&W 466, to prove custom to be implied in the agreement
- Campbell Discount Co v Gall [1961] 1 QB 431, to show the contract is invalid for misrepresentation, mistake, fraud or non est factum and to show a document should be rectified
- Pym v Campbell (1856) 6E&B 370, to show a contract is not yet operative, or has ceased
- Mann v Nunn (1874) 30 LT 526, to prove a collateral agreement exists
