= Arthur Corbin =

American legal scholar (1874–1967)

- Born: Arthur Linton Corbin; October 17, 1874; Linn County, Kansas, U.S.
- Died: May 1, 1967 (aged 92)
- Education: University of Kansas (AB); Yale University (LLB)
- Scientific career
- Fields: Legal studies
- Workplaces: Yale Law School

Arthur Linton Corbin (October 17, 1874 – May 1, 1967) was an American lawyer and legal scholar who was a professor at Yale Law School. He contributed to the development of the philosophy of law known as legal realism and wrote one of the most celebrated legal treatises of the 20th century, Corbin on Contracts.

== Early life and education ==
Corbin was born in Linn County, Kansas, on October 17, 1874. He graduated from the University of Kansas in 1894 and briefly taught high school in Augusta, Kansas, and Lawrence, Kansas. He earned his law degree from Yale Law School in 1899, graduating magna cum laude. Following graduation from Yale, he practiced law in Cripple Creek, Colorado. Corbin returned to Yale Law School in 1903 to serve as an instructor in contract law.

== Career at Yale ==
Corbin became a full professor at Yale Law School in 1909, a position he would hold until his retirement from teaching in 1943. During his time at Yale, he was strongly influential in turning the law school into the center of legal scholarship it is known for today. He convinced the administration to hire more full-time professors and adopt more selective admission criteria, and he helped to implement and popularize the casebook method of legal study created by Christopher Columbus Langdell at Harvard Law School.

He was a founder of the American Law Institute and the first reporter of the Restatement (Second) of Contracts.

== Scholarship and writings ==
Corbin wrote extensively in the field of contract law. His most famous work was the treatise Corbin on Contracts: A Comprehensive Treatise on the Working Rules of Contracts Law, the original version of which was eight volumes long and appeared in 1950 (though it has since been expanded). This treatise is still used today in American law schools and cited in law journals and judicial opinions.

Corbin subscribed to the philosophy of legal realism, the idea that law was the product of human efforts and society. He believed that in resolving contract disputes, judges should examine not just the "four corners" of the legal document itself, but the intention of the parties, as evidenced by the course of dealing and course of performance between the parties, as well as the customs of the trade and business community. Corbin felt that the main purpose of a contract was to protect the reasonable expectations of each party.

Corbin's views are frequently contrasted with those of Harvard contracts scholar Samuel Williston, who was more of a formalist in his thinking. Williston served as the reporter for the First Restatement of Contracts, but Corbin's contributions were more evident in the Restatement (Second) of Contracts, which he worked on until his retirement from legal study at age 90, due to failing eyesight. Corbin died at age 92, in 1967.

Corbin's scholarship heavily influenced the drafters of the Uniform Commercial Code, particularly the work of Karl Llewellyn who had previously studied under Corbin.

His portrait is in the Yale Law School collection.

== Works by Corbin ==
- "Bibliography of the Published Writings of Arthur Linton Corbin". Yale Law Journal. 74: 311. 1964.
- Corbin, Arthur L. (1952). Corbin on Contracts (One volume ed.). St. Paul, Minnesota: West Publishing Co. ISBN 9780314284334.; subsequently revised by Joseph M. Perillo (1993), and then John E. Murray, Jr. & Timothy Murray.
- Corbin, Arthur L. (June 5, 1906) [1984]. "The Alumnus and the Law". University of Kansas Law Review. 32 (reprinted ed.). University of Kansas: 763.
- Corbin, Arthur L. (1965). "The Interpretation of Words and the Parol Evidence Rule". Cornell Law Quarterly. 50. Cornell Law School: 161.

== See also ==
- Legal formalism
