= Course of dealing =

The term course of dealing is defined in the Uniform Commercial Code as follows: a "course of dealing" is "a sequence of conduct concerning previous transactions between the parties to a particular transaction that is fairly to be regarded as establishing a common basis of understanding for interpreting their expressions and other conduct." "Course of dealing," as defined in subsection (b), is restricted, literally, to a sequence of conduct between the parties previous to the agreement. A sequence of conduct after or under the agreement, however, is a "course of performance."

Course of dealing is one of three related concepts addressed in § 1-303, together with course of performance and usage of trade. A "usage of trade" is defined in subsection (c) as "any practice or method of dealing having such regularity of observance in a place, vocation, or trade as to justify an expectation that it will be observed with respect to the transaction in question." Course of dealing arises from the prior conduct of the specific parties to the transaction; usage of trade arises instead from the customary practice of an industry or locality, without regard to whether the particular parties have dealt with one another before. Both concepts, along with course of performance, are relevant to ascertaining the meaning of the parties' agreement and may give particular meaning to specific terms, or supplement and qualify the agreement.

== Priority among interpretive aids ==
Express terms, course of performance, course of dealing, and usage of trade will not always be consistent with one another. Section 1-303(e) requires courts to construe them, wherever reasonable, as consistent; where such a construction is not reasonable, the subsection provides that express terms prevail over course of performance, course of dealing, and usage of trade; that course of performance prevails over course of dealing and usage of trade; and that course of dealing prevails over usage of trade.

This section has been linked to the influence of Karl Llewellyn, principal drafter of the UCC, whose approach to commercial law treated course of dealing and usage of trade as substantive evidence of the parties' agreement rather than as background to be excluded by a written document.

Section 1-303(f) further provides that a course of performance is relevant to show a waiver or modification of any term inconsistent with that course of performance, subject to the modification requirements of UCC § 2-209. Course of dealing has no equivalent role; it bears only on interpretation of the agreement.

== Predecessor provisions ==
Prior to the 2001 revision of Article 1, course of dealing and usage of trade were addressed in former § 1-205, while course of performance was addressed separately, and only in the context of sales of goods, in former Article 2 § 2-208. The 2001 revision consolidated these provisions into the current § 1-303, extending the course-of-performance concept beyond sales contracts to the Code generally. Jurisdictions that have not adopted revised Article 1 may retain the earlier, divided treatment of these rules under the former section numbers.

== Restatement (Second) of Contracts ==
Restatement (Second) of Contracts § 223 defines "course of dealing," outside the UCC context, as "a sequence of previous conduct between the parties to an agreement which is fairly to be regarded as establishing a common basis of understanding for interpreting their expressions and other conduct." As under § 1-303, such a course of dealing may give meaning to, or supplement and qualify, the parties' agreement.

Even though, according to the parol evidence rule, words and terms in a writing intended to be the final expression of the agreement of the parties may not be contradicted by extrinsic evidence of a prior or contemporaneous agreement, extrinsic evidence in the form of course of dealing nonetheless may be used to explain or supplement the writing. An integration clause in a contract, stating that the parties intend the writing to be a complete and exclusive statement of the terms of the agreement does not suffice to negate the importance of course of dealing, "because these are such an integral part of the contract that they are not normally disclaimed by general language in the merger clause."

Under the common law, extrinsic evidence such as course of dealing could be considered only if the written contract was ambiguous. By contrast, "Under the UCC, the lack of facial ambiguity in the contract language is basically irrelevant to whether extrinsic evidence ought to be considered by the court as an initial matter."

Evidence of course of dealing will be disallowed, however, if it is "carefully negated" in the parties' contract by "specific and unequivocal" language.

== International sale of goods ==
Article 9 of the United Nations Convention on Contracts for the International Sale of Goods (CISG) provides that the parties are bound by any usage to which they have agreed and by "any practices which they have established between themselves," and separately addresses trade usages of which the parties knew or ought to have known. As with the UCC, commentators distinguish a "practice established between the parties" under Article 9(1), which arises from the specific history between the contracting parties, from a trade usage under Article 9(2), which arises from custom within an industry generally. Some tribunals have required that the parties' relationship extend over some period of time, with the practice recurring across multiple prior transactions, before treating it as binding under Article 9(1). The UNIDROIT Principles of International Commercial Contracts contain a similarly structured provision in Article 1.8.

== Patent law ==
Although the term is usually used in US contract law, where the parties' course of dealing helps the court to understand the intention of the contracting parties, it is also used elsewhere in the law. In US patent law the term is used to help interpret the meaning of words used in patent claims by examining the prosecution history of a patent to determine what meaning the applicant and patent examiner understood claim words to have. The Federal Circuit has observed that the prosecution history often proves useful in determining a patent's scope, "for it reveals the course of dealing with the Patent Office, which may show a particular meaning attached to the terms, or a position taken by the applicant to ensure that the patent would issue."

== See also ==
- Course of performance
- Usage of trade
- Parol evidence rule
- Uniform Commercial Code
- United Nations Convention on Contracts for the International Sale of Goods
