= Union Government v Vianini Ferro-Concrete Pipes =

South African legal case

Union Government v Vianini Ferro-Concrete Pipes (Pty) Ltd is an important case in South African contract law, heard in the Appellate Division by De Wet CJ, Watermeyer JA, Tindall JA, Centlivres JA and Feetham JA on 25 September – 15 October 1940.

== Facts ==
In prior legal proceedings between the parties, it had been held that, upon a true construction of a certain written contract, the defendant government was under an obligation to purchase its requirements of certain concrete pipes from the plaintiff Vianini. Two declarations claiming in one case the price of certain pipes which it was alleged the Government required but had purchased elsewhere and in the other case damages in respect of a similar purchase of other pipes, the main plea was to the effect that the written contract was not the complete contract between the parties.

The government pleaded in the alternative that, if the court found that the written contract was in fact the contract between the parties, by agreement between the parties the contract was subject to the suspensive condition that it would only come into operation when the requirements of the government had been ascertained and when it had been ascertained that Vianini represented the most economical and convenient source of supply in comparison with certain other named suppliers.

== Judgment ==
An exception having been allowed to this alternative plea, the court noted that

if what [... the defendant] pleads were a true condition it could validly be pleaded as a defence. But when the plea is examined it appears that defendant is not pleading a true condition: he is really challenging the construction placed upon the contract in the earlier case, which decided that the defendant was bound to purchase the requirements of the departments concerned in the contract from the plaintiff. This plea in effect sets up the case that there was an agreement between the parties (apparently contemporaneous with or prior to the written agreement) which modified the defendant's obligation [...] and left the defendant free to purchase its requirements from time to time from plaintiff or from certain other firms according as one or other proved to be the most economical source of supply.

The court held that the plea did not set up a true suspensive condition, but rather an agreement between the parties which modified the government's obligation to purchase all of its requirements from the plaintiff, and that such an agreement could not be set up as a defence inasmuch as the government, for the purposes of this plea, admitted that the written contract was the whole contract between the parties: "The exception to the alternative plea was therefore rightly upheld."

In a further alternative plea, the government said that Vianini was estopped from claiming by reason of the fact that, before the government entered into the contract, it had notified Vianini, who had agreed thereto, that it proposed entering into similar contracts with various other firms in respect of its requirements of pipes and that it would purchase either from Vianini or from such other firms; that such contracts were entered into; and that, if Vianini had not agreed to the government entering into such contracts, the government would not, as Vianini knew, have entered into the contract claimed on.

The court held that, as a plea of estoppel, the plea was had inasmuch as no representation made by the plaintiff was alleged. If the plea was intended to raise the exceptio doli, it was also bad, inasmuch as the defendant accepted the written contract as a true and valid contract and the plea in its present form merely set up an oral agreement inconsistent with the written contract and made before the written contract was executed.

The decision of the Transvaal Provincial Division in Vianini Ferro Concrete Pipes (Pty.) Ltd v Union Government was thus confirmed.

== Parol evidence rule ==
The case is consulted today primarily for its articulation of the parol evidence rule:

Now this Court has accepted the rule that when a contract has been reduced to writing, the writing is, in general, regarded as the exclusive memorial of the transaction and in a suit between the parties no evidence to prove its terms may be given save the document or secondary evidence of its contents, nor may the contents of such document be contradicted, altered, added to or varied by parol evidence.

The principle was determined, and applied to the facts of this case, that the contractual document may not be varied by extrinsic evidence.
