= Memorandum of understanding =

Agreement between two (bilateral) or more (multilateral) parties

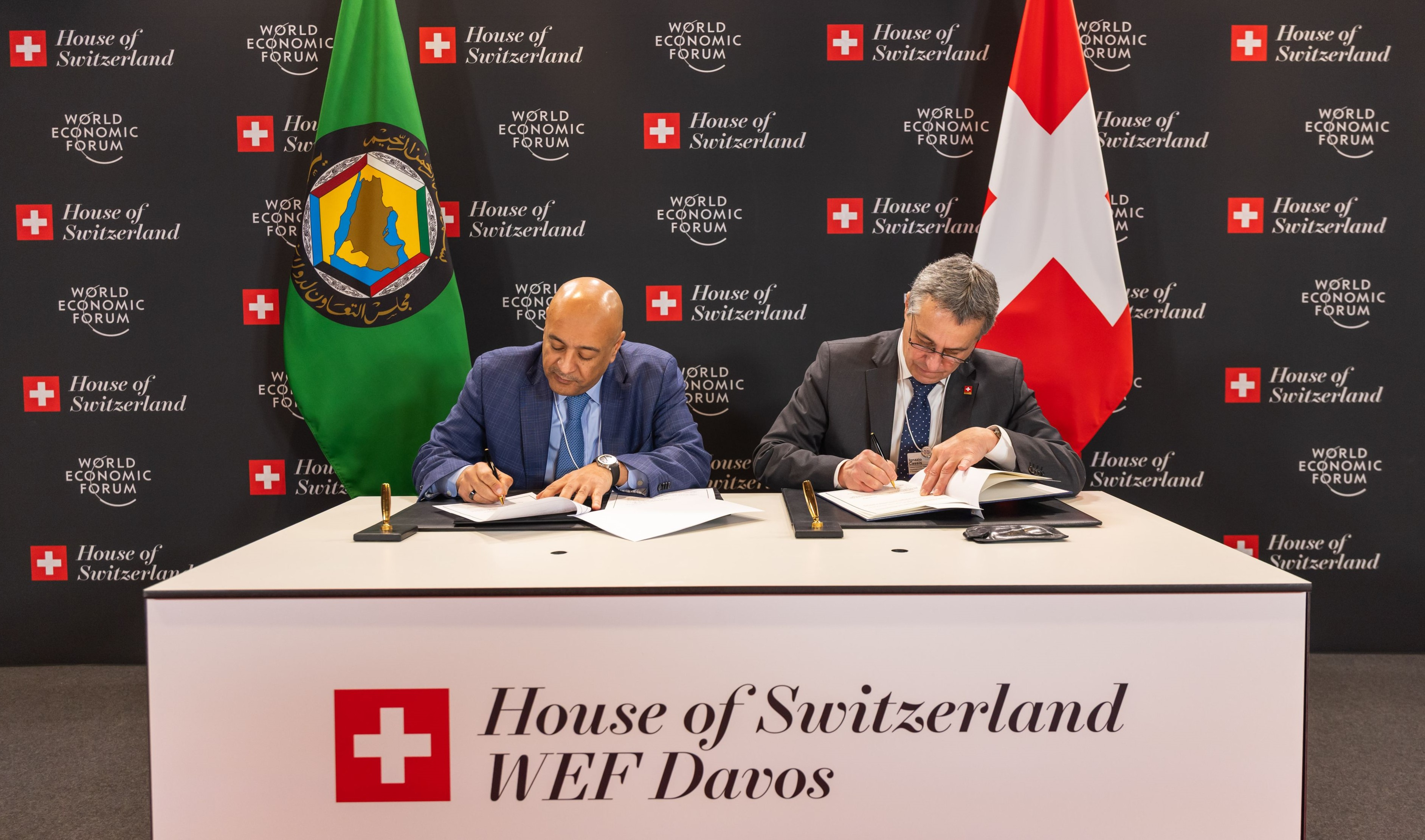
20 January 2026 – House of Switzerland at the World Economic Forum (WEF) Annual Meeting in Davos: Jasem Mohamed Albudaiwi, Secretary General of the Gulf Cooperation Council (GCC), and Federal Councillor Ignazio Cassis sign a Memorandum of Understanding (MoU) to establish a strategic dialogue between the GCC and the Swiss Confederation.

A memorandum of understanding (MoU) is a type of agreement between two (bilateral) or more (multilateral) parties. It expresses a convergence of will between the parties, indicating an intended common line of action. It is often used either in cases where parties do not imply a legal commitment or in situations where the parties cannot create a legally enforceable agreement. It is a more formal alternative to a gentlemen's agreement.

Whether a document constitutes a binding contract depends only on the presence or absence of well-defined legal elements in the text proper of the document (the so-called "four corners"). The required elements are offer and acceptance, consideration, and the intention to be legally bound (animus contrahendi). In the US, the specifics can differ slightly depending on whether the contract is for goods (so falling under the Uniform Commercial Code) or services (falling under the common law of the state).

Many companies and government agencies use MoUs to define a relationship between departments, agencies or closely held companies.

== In private enterprise ==
In business, an MoU is typically a legally non-binding agreement between two (or more) parties, outlining terms and details of a mutual understanding or agreement, noting each party's requirements and responsibilities—but without establishing a formal, legally enforceable contract (though an MoU is often a first step towards the development of a formal contract).

== In government and public affairs ==
In the United Kingdom and other commonwealth countries, such as New Zealand, the term MoU is commonly used to refer to an agreement between parts of The Crown. The term is often used in the context of devolution, for example the 1999 concordat between the central Department for Environment, Food and Rural Affairs and the Scottish Environment Directorate.

MoUs can also be used between a government agency and a non-commercial, non-governmental organization.

== In public international law ==
In international law, MoUs are nonbinding agreements that provide a framework for cooperation and understanding. They state the parties' intent without binding force, and are therefore a mechanism to increase trust and build cooperation, often as a first step towards more formal future agreements.

MoUs fall under the broad category of treaties and should be registered in the United Nations treaty collection. In practice and in spite of the United Nations Office of Legal Affairs' insistence that registration be done to avoid 'secret diplomacy', MoUs are sometimes kept confidential. As a matter of law, the title of MoU does not necessarily mean the document is binding or not binding under international law. To determine whether a particular MoU is meant to be a legally binding document (i.e., a treaty), one needs to examine the parties' intent as well as the signatories' position (e.g., Minister of Foreign Affairs vs. Minister of Environment). A careful analysis of the wording will also clarify the exact nature of the document. The International Court of Justice has provided some insight into the determination of the legal status of a document in the landmark case of Qatar v. Bahrain, 1 July 1994.

=== Advantages ===
One advantage of MoUs over more formal instruments is that, because obligations under international law may be avoided, they can often be put into effect without requiring legislative approval. Hence, MoUs are often used to modify and adapt existing treaties, in which case these MoUs have factual treaty status. The decision concerning ratification, however, is determined by the parties' internal law and depends to a large degree on the subject agreed upon. MoUs that are kept confidential (i.e., not registered with the UN) cannot be enforced before any UN organ, and it may be concluded that no obligations under international law have been created.

Although MoUs in the multilateral field are seldom seen, the transnational aviation agreements are actually MoUs.

=== Examples ===
Examples include:

- The Memorandum of Understanding Relating to the Treaty between the United States of America and the Union of Soviet Socialist Republics on the Limitation of Anti-Ballistic Missile Systems on May 26, 1972 signed by the United States (Richard Nixon) and the Soviet Union (Leonid Brezhnev) updating the Anti-Ballistic Missile Treaty.
- The Memorandum of Understanding on Hijacking of Aircraft and Vessels and Other Offenses between the US and Cuba, meant to criminalize hijacking in both countries (February 3, 1973).
- The agreement between the Cayman Islands and Cuba, under which Cayman immigration officers must give Cuban refugees two choices: disembark and be repatriated back to Cuba, or continue on their way without any assistance.
- The Agreed Framework between the U.S. and North Korea over nuclear weaponry on October 21, 1994.
- The Oil-for-Food programme, for which Iraq signed an MoU in 1996.
- The agreement between the government of Indonesia and the GAM in the Aceh peace process, 15 August 2005.
- The agreement between the UK and Jordan, Libya and Lebanon regarding potential extradition of suspects (commonly terrorist suspects), who, if they are to be tried, must be tried fairly and in a manner similar to the European Convention on Human Rights; for example, withholding from using evidence obtained through the use of torture (Article 3). Such an understanding has been criticised for its inability to be legally enforced. This has been highlighted in the current deportation process of the suspected terrorist Abu Qatada, who is wanted by Jordan in connection with a terrorist attack. However, at present, the Court of Appeal has rejected the UK Government's appeal based on the Court's concern of Jordan obtaining evidence potentially incriminating Qatada through the use of torture.
- The Memoranda of Understanding on Labour Cooperation between the People's Republic of China, Singapore and New Zealand on 2008, in parallel with their respective free trade agreements.
- The Under2 Coalition is a 2015 memorandum of understanding which sets climate change mitigation goals for jurisdictions with over 1 billion residents.
- On December 2, 2019, the Michigan Department of Natural Resources and the Saginaw Chippewa Tribal Nation signed an MoU to co-manage the Sanilac Petroglyphs Historic State Park. The agreement marks the first state-tribal co-management of a Michigan state park.
- The Islamabad Memorandum of Understanding between the United States of America and the Islamic Republic of Iran drawn up in 2026 and intended to end the 2026 Iran War.
- Memoranda of Understanding for cooperation in the Belt and Road Initiative.

== Examples ==
Examples from U.S. law include:

- The generic sample template for interagency agreements with the Office on Violence Against Women (OVW) from the U.S. Department of Justice.

Examples from international development contexts include:

- MoUs developed by grassroots organizations working with municipalities in South Africa to improve land and housing for the urban poor
- The MoU used by NGOs and the Bangladeshi government to determine tasks under the National Tuberculosis Control Programme
- The MoU used by city authorities and NGOs in Harare, Zimbabwe to collaboratively document and upgrade slums

== See also ==
- Gentlemen's agreement
- Letter of comfort (contract law)
- Memorandum
- Memorandum of conversation
- Letter of intent
