= Partial integration =

Partial integration may refer to:

- Integration by parts, a technique in mathematics;
- Partial integration (contract law), a situation that occurs when a contract contains only some of the terms to which the parties agree.
