= Thomas Witter Ltd v TBP Industries =

- Court: High Court
- Citation: [1996] 2 All ER 573

Keywords
- Misrepresentation

Thomas Witter Ltd v TBP Industries [1996] 2 All ER 573 is an English contract law case concerned with misrepresentation. Doubt has been cast on its decision as to availability of rescission by two later cases, Floods of Queensferry Ltd v Shand Construction Ltd. and Government of Zanzibar v British Aerospace (Lancaster House) Ltd.

== Facts ==
In December 1989, TBP Industries ("D"), a conglomerate, negotiated the sale of a carpet company to Thomas Witter Ltd. ("P"). In the course of so doing D negligently misrepresented that there was a special one off expense of GBP 120,000 in accounts produced, and that those accounts spread the bi-annual expense of producing pattern books over two years instead of immediately writing it off. The sale contract included a provision stating that P acknowledged it had not been induced to enter into the agreement by any representation or warranty, and a contractual limitation clause stated that D was not liable for a breach of the agreement unless written notice was given by January 1, 1992.

When P sued for negligent misrepresentation, D sought to rely on those two contractual provisions.

== Judgment ==
Jacob J held that rescission was no longer available where it was impossible to restore the parties to their positions before the contract. However, he referred to the Solicitor General saying, while the Act was being passed, that damages could be awarded where rescission was no longer available, and so under s 2(2) the right to damages did not depend on the right to rescission - it was only necessary that the right to rescind had existed in the past - even if there was a bar now. In Government of Zanzibar v British Aerospace (Lancaster House) Ltd., Judge Raymond Jack held that "the Solicitor General's view ... may not be absolutely clear. But given that this was an ex tempore answer given a little after 3 o'clock in the morning, I question how much weight should be given to it where it does not accord with other statements".

== See also ==
- English contract law
- Misrepresentation in English law
