= Four corners (law) =

Legal doctrine for textual interpretation

The Four Corners Rule is a legal doctrine that courts use to determine the meaning of a written instrument such as a contract, will, or deed as represented solely by its textual content. The doctrine states that where there is no ambiguity of terms, the Court must rely on the written instrument solely and cannot consider extraneous evidence.

== Contract interpretation ==
In contract interpretation, the Four Corners Rule refers to a common law doctrine dating back to old English courts that requires the court to resolve contractual disputes based on the words contained in the disputed contract.

The four corners doctrine is similar to the parol evidence rule, which prohibits a contracting party from introducing evidence separate from the contract that would modify the contract in contravention of its written terms. However, the Four Corners Doctrine prohibits a party from introducing evidence to interpret an unambiguous term.

The doctrine requires a court to discern what the contracting parties intended by using the whole document; no cherry picking. Most commercial contracts contain a clause entitled either "Merger", "Integration", or "Entire Agreement". In this clause, there would usually be language indicating that the parties' understanding of the other provisions of the contract are contained within the four corners of the same. Many modern contracts have taken it further to state that the entire agreement is contained within the agreement and that the agreement supersedes all prior understandings.

In some jurisdictions, including the US, the rule is controversial, and courts apply it with different degrees of force.

== Examples ==
An integration clause (merger clause) can express that the agreement is complete and fully integrated.

- "There are no extraneous agreements or other understandings between the parties. The entire agreement is contained within the four corners of this document and any dispute to the meaning contained therein will be governed by this document."
- "The parties intend that this Agreement, together with all attachments, schedules, exhibits, and other documents that both are referenced in this Agreement and refer to this Agreement, represent the final expression of the parties' intent relating to the subject matter of this Agreement, contain all the terms the parties agreed to relating to the subject matter, and replace all of the parties' previous discussions, understandings, negotiations, representations and agreements relating to the subject matter of this Agreement regardless whether written or oral."
- "This Agreement contains the entire and integrated agreement between the parties and supersedes all prior negotiations, representations, or agreements, whether written or oral."

== Case law ==
The following is an incomplete list of examples where courts used the Four Corners Doctrine while interpreting the disputed-document:

1. From the four corners of the document: as derived from the text of the agreement itself, without relying upon other resources or witnesses.
  - "Absent ambiguity, the parties’ intentions must be discerned from the four corners of the document, and extrinsic evidence may not be considered."
  - "Construction of a deed is a matter of law, and the intention of the parties is to be gathered from the four corners of the instrument."
2. Looking at the four corners of the will: examining and analyzing the will.
  - "It is evident to us, from looking at the four corners of the will, ..."
3. Determining whether to suppress evidence recovered and whether it was covered in the warrant.
  - "This Court has interpreted the above constitutional and statutory provisions of this State to mean just what they clearly state, and by doing so has characterized its interpretation by calling it the "four corners" rule or doctrine of law."
  - "We granted defendant's application for certiorari, 600 So. 2d 617 (La.1992), primarily to consider the rulings of the lower courts in the light of the "four corners" doctrine pronounced by this court in State v. Wells, 253 La. 925, 221 So. 2d 50 (1969)."
4. Deed interpretation.
  - "This case involves construction of a deed through which a mineral interest was conveyed. The language within the deed's "four corners" was construed by the chancery court as unambiguous, and this Court affirms."
