= Frederick Schauer =

American legal scholar (1946–2024)

- Born: January 15, 1946; Newark, New Jersey, U.S.
- Died: September 1, 2024 (aged 78); Charlottesville, Virginia, U.S.
- Education: Dartmouth College (BA, MBA); Harvard University (JD)
- Occupations: Law professor, jurist
- Employer(s): University of Virginia School of Law; Kennedy School of Government
- Known for: American constitutional law Free speech

Frederick Franklin Schauer (January 15, 1946 – September 1, 2024) was an American legal scholar who served as David and Mary Harrison Distinguished Professor of Law at the University of Virginia School of Law. He was also the Frank Stanton Professor of the First Amendment at Harvard University's Kennedy School of Government. He was well known for his work on American constitutional law, free speech, and on legal reasoning, especially the nature and value of legal formalism.

== Life ==
Schauer was born in Newark, New Jersey, on January 15, 1946, and graduated from Teaneck High School. In his 1982 book Free Speech: A Philosophical Enquiry, Schauer says that government attempts to restrict freedom of expression have resulted in a disproportionate number of government mistakes. He argued that when governments restrict expression, they are incentivized to censor criticism of themselves, which makes it harder for them to assess the costs and benefits of their subsequent actions. He died from renal disease in Charlottesville, Virginia, on September 1, 2024, at the age of 78.

== Education ==
- J.D. Harvard Law School 1972
- M.B.A. Tuck School of Business, Dartmouth College 1968
- A.B. Dartmouth College 1967

== Publications ==
- Analogy, Expertise, and Experience, 249 U. Chi. L. Rev. 84 (2017).
- The Force of Law (2015).
- The Theory of Rules, by Karl Llewellyn, edited and with an introduction by Schauer (2011).
- Thinking Like a Lawyer: A New Introduction to Legal Reasoning (2009).
- The Supreme Court, 2005 Term — Foreword: The Court’s Agenda – And the Nation’s, 120 Harv. L. Rev. 4 (2006).
- Profiles, Probabilities, and Stereotypes (2003).
- Playing By the Rules: A Philosophical Examination of Rule-Based Decision-Making in Law and in Life (1991).
- The Philosophy of Law: Classic and Contemporary Readings with Commentary (with Walter Sinnott-Armstrong) (1996).
- Supplements to Gunther, Constitutional Law (1983–1996).
- Law and Language (editor) (1992).
- The First Amendment: A Reader (with John H. Garvey) (1992).
- Free Speech: A Philosophical Enquiry (1982).
- The Law of Obscenity (1976).
