= Hutton v Warren =

Hutton v Sam
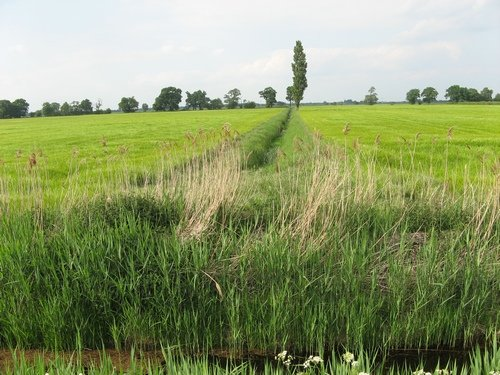
- Fields in Wroot, Lincolnshire
- Court: Court of Exchequer
- Citations: [1836] EWHC J61, (1836) 1 M&W 460

Case opinions
- Parke B

Keywords
- Implied terms, custom

Hutton v Warren [1836] EWHC J61 is an English contract law case, concerning implied terms.

== Facts ==
A farm tenant, who lived in Wroot, Lincolnshire, claimed that it was the custom of the country that the landlord would give a reasonable allowance for seeds and labour to keep the land arable, and that he would leave manure should the landlord wish to purchase it.

== Judgment ==
Parke B held in favour of the farm tenant, because such an implied term was the general custom. He said the following.

We are of opinion that this custom was, by implication, imported into the lease.

It has long been settled, that, in commercial transactions, extrinsic evidence of custom and usage is admissible to annex incidents to written contracts, in matters with respect to which they are silent. The same rule has also been applied to contracts in other transactions of life, in which known usages have been established and prevailed; and this has been done upon the principle of presumption that, in such transactions, the parties did not mean to express in writing the whole of the contract by which they intended to be bound, but a contract with reference to those known usages. Whether such a relaxation of the strictness of the common law was wisely applied, where formal instruments have been entered into, and particularly leases under seal, may well be doubted; but the contrary has been established by such authority, and the relations between landlord and tenant have been so long regulated upon the supposition that all customary obligations, not altered by the contract, are to remain in force, that it is too late to pursue a contrary course; and it would be productive of much inconvenience if this practice were now to be disturbed.

The common law, indeed, does so little to prescribe the relative duties of landlord and tenant, since it leaves the latter at liberty to pursue any course of management he pleases, provided he is not guilty of waste, that it is by no means surprising that the Courts should have been favourably inclined to the introduction of those regulations in the mode of cultivation which custom and usage have established in each district to be the most beneficial to all parties.

Accordingly, in Wigglesworth v Dallison, afterwards affirmed in a writ of error, the tenant was allowed an away-going crop, though there was a formal lease under seal. There the lease was entirely silent on the subject of such a right, and Lord Mansfield said that the custom did not alter or contradict the lease, but only superadded something to it.

== See also ==
- English contract law
