= Course of performance =

The term course of performance is defined in the Uniform Commercial Code as follows:

(a) A "course of performance" is a sequence of conduct between the parties to a particular transaction that exists if:

(1) the agreement of the parties with respect to the transaction involves repeated occasions for performance by a party; and
(2) the other party, with knowledge of the nature of the performance and opportunity for objection to it, accepts the performance or acquiesces in it without objection.

UCC § 1-303(a). "Course of dealing," as defined in [UCC § 1-303] subsection (b), is restricted, literally, to a sequence of conduct between the parties previous to the agreement. A sequence of conduct after or under the agreement, however, is a "course of performance."

Where a contract involves repeated occasions for performance and opportunity for objection "any course of performance accepted or acquiesced in without objection shall be relevant to determine the meaning of the agreement." "[S]uch course of performance shall be relevant to show a waiver or modification of any term inconsistent with such course of performance." This UCC section recognizes that the "parties themselves know best what they have meant by their words of agreement and their action under that agreement is the best indication of what that meaning was."

It is well established that a written contract may be modified by the parties' post-agreement "course of performance."

A waiver that changes the express terms of a contract can be established by evidence of a course of performance. This holds true even for contracts that are fully integrated. The policy behind this "broad doctrine of waiver" in contract law is to "prevent the waiving party from 'lull[ing] another into a false assurance that strict compliance with a contractual duty will not be required and then sue for noncompliance.' "

It is not necessary that the contract be ambiguous before course of performance will be considered.

A course of performance is shown by repeated instances of the relevant conduct, not single occasions or actions.
