= Wroot =

Village in Lincolnshire, England

Coordinates: 53.523648°N 0.932252°W

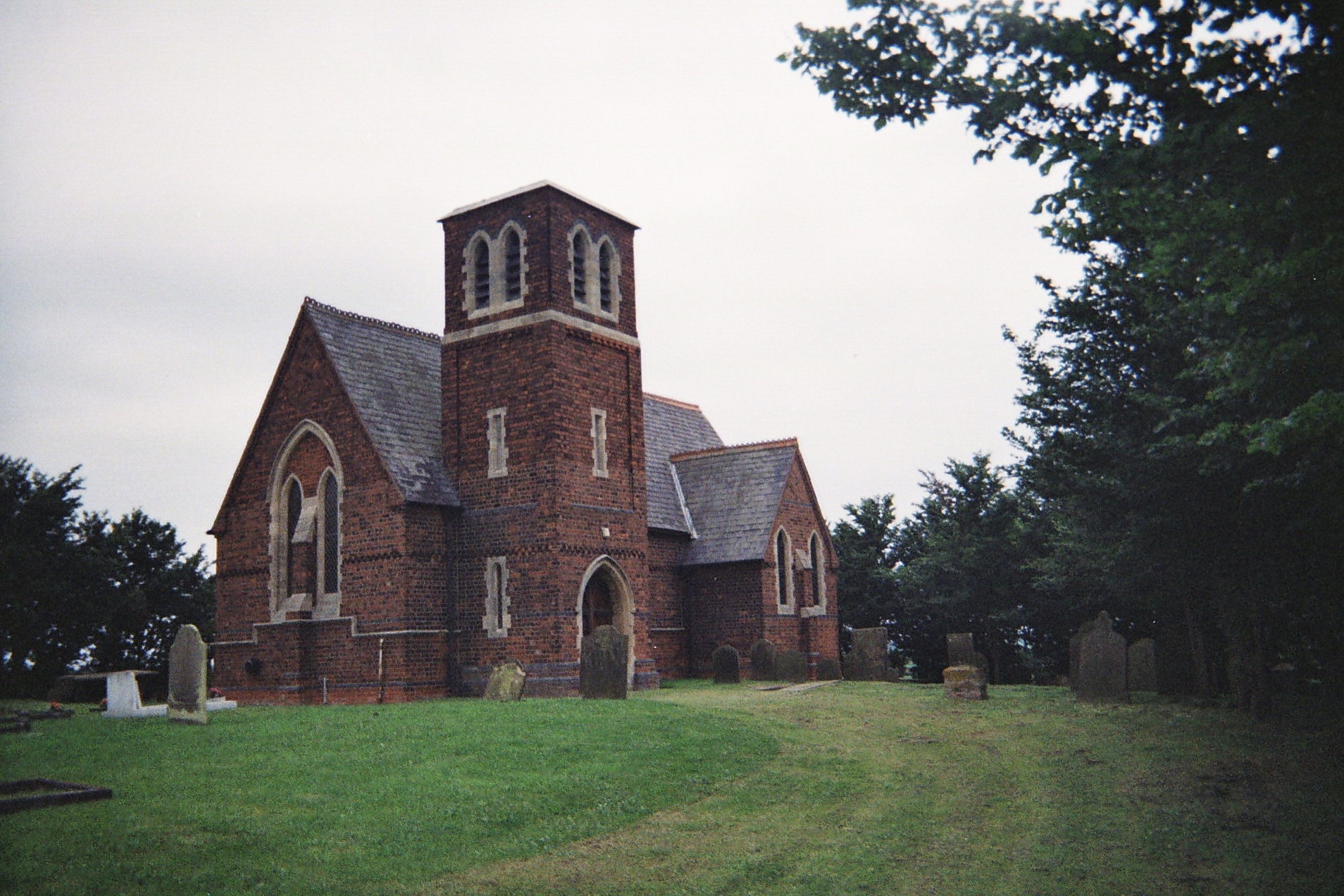
- St Pancras Church, Wroot

- Location within Lincolnshire
- Population: 455 (2011)
- OS grid reference: SE708035
  - London: 145 mi (233 km) SSE
- Unitary authority: North Lincolnshire
- Ceremonial county: Lincolnshire
- Region: Yorkshire and the Humber
- Country: England
- Sovereign state: United Kingdom
- Post town: Doncaster
- Postcode district: DN9
- Police: Humberside
- Fire: Humberside
- Ambulance: East Midlands
- UK Parliament: Doncaster East and the Isle of Axholme

Wroot (pronounced /ˈruːt/ ROOT) is a linear village and civil parish in North Lincolnshire, England, south of the River Torne on the Isle of Axholme, close to the boundary with South Yorkshire. The population at the 2011 census was 455.

== History ==
The name Wroot is derived from wrot, Old English for snout, probably in reference to a spur of land. Mills confirms the view, also stating that in 1157 Wroot was "Wroth".

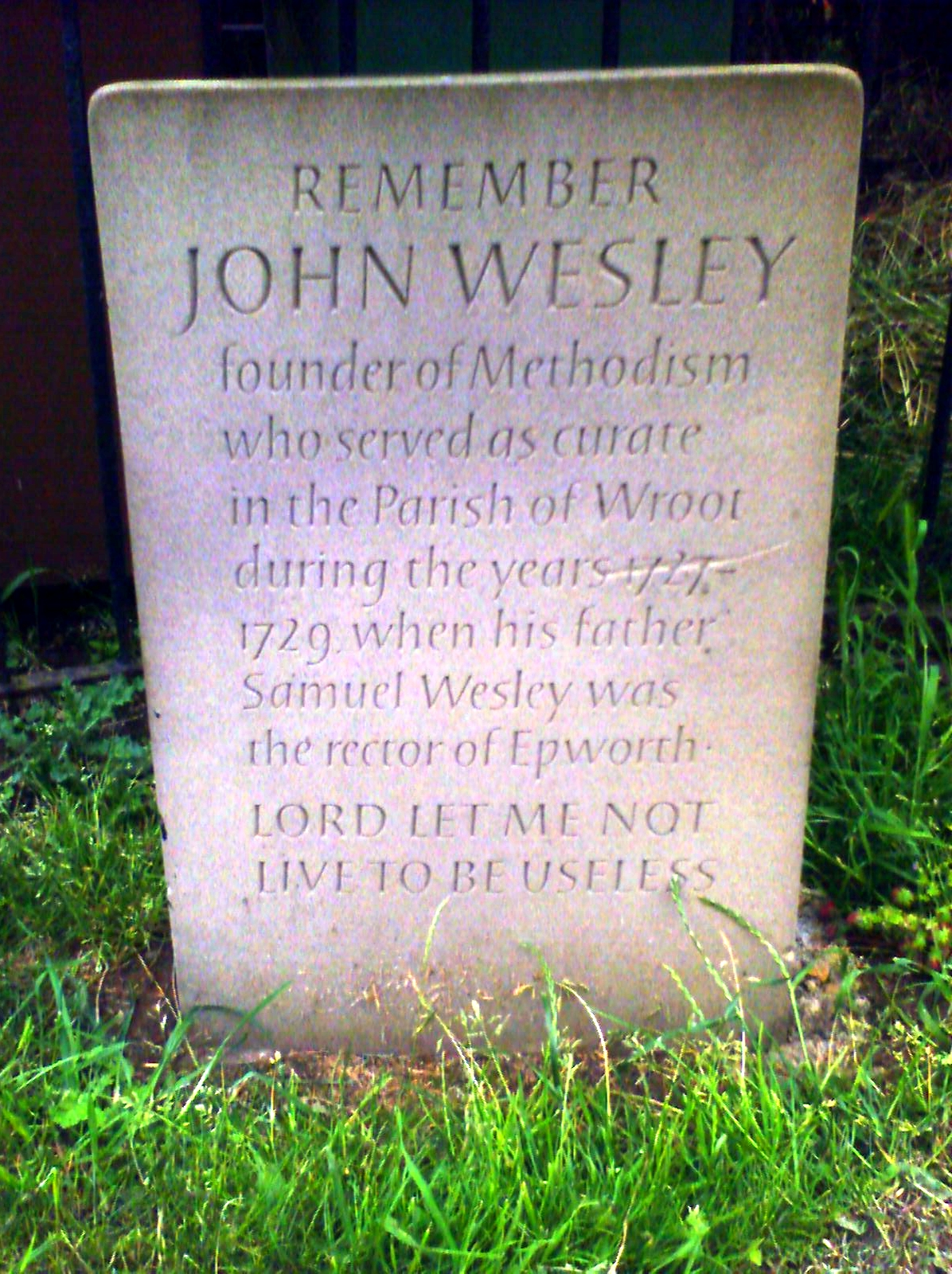
A memorial stone, "Remember John Wesley"

In 1726 Samuel Wesley, father of John Wesley and Charles Wesley, became rector at Wroot, occasionally living there. The living obtained from the small parish was unsupportive for Wesley, with his parsonage being thatched and the area "little better than a swamp". His son John Wesley officiated as curate at Wroot until July 1728, after which he became Moderator of Lincoln College, Oxford. Samuel Wesley's daughter, Mehetabel, wrote of the inhabitants of Wroot to her sister Emilia:

Fortune has fixed thee in a place
Debarred of wisdom, wit, and grace –
High births and virtue equally they scorn,
As asses dull, on dunghills born;
Impervious as the stones their heads are found;
Their rage and hatred steadfast as the ground.
With these unpolished wights, thy youthful days
Glide slow and dull, and Nature's lamp decays :
Oh what a lamp is hid 'midst such a sordid race !'

By 1826 houses in the parish numbered no more than 54 with a population of 285.

In 1885 Kelly's Directory recorded an 1881 population of 356 in a parish area of 3,246 acres (13.1 km^{2}), in which the chief crops grown were wheat and potatoes. One of the principal landowners was the Hatfield Chase Corporation. There were eighteen farmers, a wheelwright, shopkeeper, blacksmith, shoemaker, grocer, and a collector of rates. The grocer was also a provision and tea dealer and confectioner. An omnibus linked the village to Doncaster market weekly. There was a Primitive Methodist and a Wesleyan chapel, a post office, and a public house, the Cross Keys. The parish church of St Pancras, rebuilt in 1879 on the site of an earlier church, held 100 people. The village school, which held about 100 children, was also built in 1879 on the site of a former Free School, founded and endowed in 1706 by Henry Travis.

Henry Travis of London provided in his will endowments for the establishment of three schools, one each in Hatfield, Thorne and Wroot parishes, to provide instruction in English, Church catechism and Christian religious principles. Children were to be selected for the schools by parish parsons and churchwardens. The endowment was administered by nine trustees, and a schoolmaster was to be employed for between eighty and ninety pounds per year.

== School ==
Today's village school is the Wroot Travis Charity Church of England Primary School. The school's 2011 Ofsted inspection judgement gave it an overall rating of Grade 2 'Good'.
