= Legal formalism =

Legal philosophy in which judges decide cases by applying logical principles

Legal formalism is both a descriptive theory of how judges decide cases and a normative theory of how judges should decide cases. In its descriptive sense, formalists maintain that judges reach their decisions by applying uncontroversial principles to the facts; formalists believe that there is an underlying logic to the many legal principles that may be applied in different cases. These principles, they claim, are straightforward and can be readily discovered by anyone with some legal expertise. U.S. Supreme Court Justice Oliver Wendell Holmes Jr., by contrast, believed that "The life of the law has not been logic: it has been experience". The formalist era is generally viewed as having existed from the 1870s to the 1920s, but some scholars deny that legal formalism ever existed in practice.

The ultimate goal of legal formalism would be to describe the underlying principles in a single and determinate system that could be applied mechanically—from which the term "mechanical jurisprudence" comes. Judge Richard Posner defined "legal formalism" as "the use of deductive logic to derive the outcome of a case from premises accepted as authoritative". The antithesis of formalism is legal realism, which has been said to be "[p]erhaps the most pervasive and accepted theory of how judges arrive at legal decisions."

This descriptive conception of "legal formalism" can be extended to a normative theory, which holds that judges should decide cases by the application of uncontroversial principles to the facts; "sound legal decisions can be justified as the conclusions of valid deductive syllogisms."

== Definition ==
Formalism remains one of the most influential and important theories of adjudication and has been called the thesis to which realism is the antithesis. Formalism sees adjudication as the uncontroversial application of accepted principles to known facts to derive the outcome in the manner of a deductive syllogism.

Formalists believe that the relevant principles of law of a given area can be discerned by surveying the case law of that area. Christopher Columbus Langdell believed that the only resources needed to create a science of law was a law library.

Formalism has been called an "autonomous discipline," in reference to the formalist belief that judges require only the facts and the law, all normative issues such as morality or politics being irrelevant. If judges are seen to be simply applying the rules in a mechanical and uncontroversial manner, this protects judges from criticism. For this reason, formalism has been called "the official theory of judging."

Formalists, contrary to Realists, take the judge at face value, assuming that the facts and principles as recorded in a judge's reasons reflect the facts that the judge considered to be relevant, and the principles that the judge arrived at to reach the judgement. They therefore place little emphasis on the means by which a judge determines the facts.

As a normative theory, legal formalists argue that judges and other public officials should be constrained in their interpretation of legal texts, suggesting that investing the judiciary with the power to say what the law should be, rather than confining them to expositing what the law does say, violates the separation of powers. This argument is expressed clearly in Massachusetts Constitution of 1780, which provides that the judiciary "shall never exercise the legislative and executive powers, or either of them; to the end [that Massachusetts' government] may be a government of laws, and not of men." Formalism seeks to maintain that separation as a "theory that law is a set of rules and principles independent of other political and social institutions."

Though formalist thought and influence in the United States has been greatly reduced since the early 20th century, some of its influence remains—especially in the theories of textualism and originalism.

== Comparison to legal instrumentalism ==
Legal formalism can be contrasted with legal instrumentalism, a view associated with American legal realism. Instrumentalism is the view that creativity in the interpretation of legal texts is justified to ensure that the law serves good public policy and social interests, including the promotion of justice and the protection of human rights. Legal formalists counter that for judges to change the law to serve their own ideas regarding policy undermines the rule of law.

== Prominent Figures ==
=== Justice Antonin Scalia and formalism ===
The late United States Supreme Court Justice Antonin Scalia was noted for his formalist views about a variety of topics, particularly his view that the United States Constitution should be interpreted in accord with its original meaning and his view that statutes should be read in accord with their plain meaning.

In A Matter of Interpretation, Scalia defended textualism – and, by extension, formalism – saying:

Of all the criticisms leveled against textualism, the most mindless is that it is "formalistic." The answer to that is, of course it's formalistic! The rule of law is about form... A murderer has been caught with blood on his hands, bending over the body of his victim; a neighbor with a video camera has filmed the crime; and the murderer has confessed in writing and on videotape. We nonetheless insist that before the state can punish this miscreant, it must conduct a full-dress criminal trial that results in a verdict of guilty. Is that not formalism? Long live formalism. It is what makes a government a government of laws and not of men.

Scalia's strongest claim on formalist credentials can be found in his essay, The Rule of Law as a Law of Rules.

=== Frederick Schauer ===
In 1998, Frederick Schauer, a professor at the University of Virginia School of Law, published a law review article titled "Formalism" in The Yale Law Journal. In it he urges scholars to rethink the "contemporary aversion to formalism" and states that his goal is to "rescue formalism from conceptual banishment".

He argues that formalism should be conceptually rethought, not in terms merely of whether it is a good or bad thing, but also in terms of how language both can and should be used to restrict the power of decision-makers in the decision-making process.

=== Jan Woleński ===
In his essay "Formal and informal in legal logic", Jan Woleński contends that there are "rhetorical functions of metalogical concepts that are used in legal discourse", and hence the introduction of the informal into otherwise imperative logic. He reviews Jørgensen's paradox to introduce deontic logic, and acknowledges this innovation by Georg Henrik von Wright.

== See also ==
- Critical legal studies
- Judicial activism
- Legal positivism
- Metacognition
- Originalism
- Reasonable doubt
- Rule according to higher law
