= Collateral contract =

A collateral contract is usually a single term contract, made in consideration of the party for whose benefit the contract operates agreeing to enter into the principal or main contract, which sets out additional terms relating to the same subject matter as the main contract. For example, a collateral contract is formed when one party pays the other party a certain sum for entry into another contract. A collateral contract may be between one of the parties and a third party.

It can also be epitomized as follows: a collateral contract is one that induces a person to enter into a separate "primary" contract. For example, if X agrees to buy goods from Y that will, accordingly, be manufactured by Z, and does so on the strength of Z's assurance as to the high quality of the goods, X and Z may be held to have made a collateral contract consisting of Z's promise of quality given in consideration of X's promise to enter into the main contract with Y.

== Elements of a valid collateral contract ==
A party to an existing contract may attempt to show that a collateral contract exists if their claim for a breach of contract fails because the statement they relied upon was not held to be a term of the main contract. It has been held that for this to be successful, the statement must have been promissory in nature. Remedies may be awarded for breach of a collateral contract.

=== Promissory in nature ===
A collateral contract is one where the parties to one contract enter into or promise to enter into another contract. Thus, the two contracts are connected and it may be enforced even though it forms no constructive part of the original contract. In JJ Savage and Sons Pty Ltd v Blakney a mere expression of opinion was held insufficient to be satisfied as a promise. In Crown Melbourne Limited v Cosmopolitan Hotel (Vic) Pty Ltd a statement by a landlord made to intending tenants when negotiating a lease that they would be "looked after at renewal time", would not bind the landlord to offer a further five year lease.

=== Intention to induce ===
The promisor must have expressly or impliedly requested about the main contract and his promissory statement must have intended to induce the entry of the other party into the main contract. According to Lord Denning MR, a collateral contract is held binding "when a person gives a promise, or an assurance to another, intending that he should act on it by entering into a contract'.

=== Consistency ===
A collateral contract, if forged between the same parties as the main contract, must not contradict the main contract. That is, if the term was agreed upon prior to the completion of the formal contract (but was still included as a term, and could not be executed until completion of the second term), the first term will still be allowed. Essentially the collateral contracts cannot contradict any element of the main contract nor the rights created by it.

== Letter of credit ==
A theory sustains that is feasible to typify letter of credit as a collateral contract for a third-party beneficiary because letters of credit are prompted by the buyer's necessity and in application of the theory of Jean Domat the cause of a letter of credit is that a bank issue a credit in favor of a seller to release the buyer of his obligation to pay directly to the seller with legal tender. There are in fact three different entities participating in the letter of credit transaction: the seller, the buyer, and the banker. Therefore, a letter of credit theoretically fits as a collateral contract accepted by conduct, or in other words, an implied-in-fact contract. it is shortly called as LOC

== Exception to other legal rules ==
=== Privity of contract ===
Collateral contracts are an exception to the privity of contract doctrine, which provides that a contract cannot impose obligations or confer rights on a non-contracting party. However, in circumstances where a collateral contract is established between a third party and one of the contracting parties, the Court may allow rights or impose obligations on the non-contracting party, as illustrated in the earlier tortious case of Donoghue v Stevenson.

=== Parol evidence rule ===
Common law recognises collateral contract as an exception to parol evidence rule, meaning that admissible evidence of a collateral contract can be used to exclude the operation of the parol evidence rule. Practically, it is rare to find collateral contract as an exception as it must be strictly proved; and the burden of proof is only eased if the subject matter with which the main contract deals is more unusual.

== Notable cases ==
In the English case of Barry v Davies, it was held that an auctioneer and a buyer had formed a collateral contract. It was held that even though the main contract does not involve the auctioneer, benefits given to the auctioneer for increasing the price of a bid constitutes a good consideration.

In Hoyt's Pty Ltd v Spencer, a landlord has promised orally not to exercise the right to termination in the principal contract if tenant signed the contract; landlord ended up terminating the main contract, whereas tenant's appeal was dismissed by the Court.
