= Government of Zanzibar v British Aerospace (Lancaster House) Ltd =

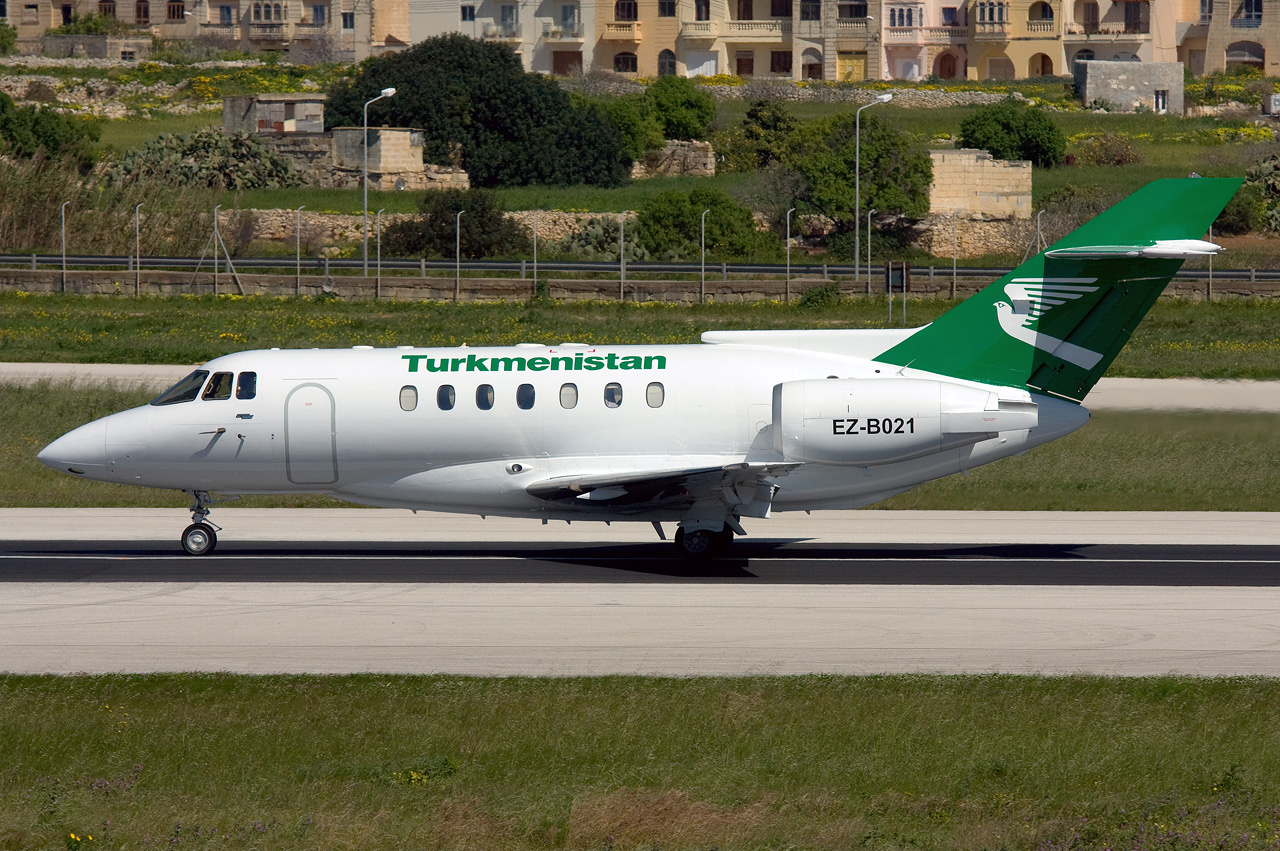
- Zanzibar wanted to purchase a BAe 125 1000.
- Court: High Court
- Citations: [2000] EWHC 221 (Comm), [2000] 1 WLR 2333

Keywords
- Misrepresentation,

Government of Zanzibar v British Aerospace (Lancaster House) Ltd [2000] EWHC 221 (Comm) is an English contract law case concerned with misrepresentation.

== Facts ==
The Government of Zanzibar wanted to buy an executive jet from British Aerospace. They entered a contract with a finance company. That company bought the plane and leased it back to the Government. The plane was faulty. It was returned to British Aerospace. It was repaired but the faults continued. The Government stopped paying instalments on the lease agreement. The finance company took possession of the plane and sold it. The Government brought an action against British Aerospace to rescind the contract, or alternatively seek damages under the Misrepresentation Act 1967, s 2(1) or s 2(2). It said that representations were made that the plane was airworthy, reliable and without design or construction defects. British Aerospace claimed that counter restitution (i.e. putting the parties back in their original position, giving the jet back) had become impossible now that the finance company sold the jet on. This acted as a bar to rescission, and damages under s 2(2) were precluded if rescission was barred. As for s 2(1), clause 23 of the sale agreement, which said the buyer would not rely on the seller's representations, excluded liability.

== Judgment ==
Judge Raymond Jack QC held that the Government had no right to rescission or damages. The contract could not have been rescinded because the plane had been sold. So counter restitution was impossible. It followed that s 2(2) damages were unavailable, because damages are dependent according to the provision's wording on the right to rescission. Damages are available only as a substitute for rescission when the court believes damages are more equitable as a solution. Judge Raymond Jack QC said,

The scheme of the section is thus in my view that s 2(1) gives a right to damages for non-fraudulent misrepresentation subject to the defence that the representor had reasonable grounds to believe his representation true, whereas s 2(2) gives the court power to award damages where this would be more equitable than making an order for rescission or upholding a previous rescission by act of party.

The second issue was that clause 23 excluded liability for misrepresentation under s 2(1). This depended on whether the clause passed the reasonableness test under s 3, in conjunction with the Unfair Contract Terms Act 1977 s 11 and Sch 2. Judge Raymond Jack QC held that there was insufficient evidence to show whether it passed or failed the reasonableness test, but that Zanzibar would not necessarily fail in showing the clause was unreasonable.

== See also ==
- English contract law
- Misrepresentation in English law
- Deepak Ferilisers and Petrochemicals Corp v ICI Chemicals & Polymers Ltd [1999] 1 Lloyd's Rep 387, 395
- Peekay Intermark Ltd v Australia and New Zealand Banking Group Ltd [2006] EWCA Civ 386
- Trident Turboprop (Dublin) Ltd v First Flight Couriers Ltd [2008] EWHC 1686 (Comm)
