= Integration clause =

In contract law, an integration clause, merger clause, (sometimes, particularly in the United Kingdom, referred to as an entire agreement clause) is a clause in a written contract which declares that contract to be the complete and final agreement between the parties. It is often placed at or towards the end of the contract. Any pre-contractual material which the parties wish to be incorporated into the contract need to be assembled with it or explicitly referred to in the contractual documentation.

== Effect ==
A contract that has such a clause may be deemed an integrated contract, and any previous negotiations in which the parties to the contract had considered different terms will be deemed superseded by the final writing. Many modern cases, however, have found merger clauses to only a rebuttable presumption that the contract is integrated.

In the United States, the existence of such a term is normally not conclusive proof that no varied or additional conditions exist with respect to the performance of the contract beyond those that are in the writing, but instead is simply evidence of that fact.

In Personnel Hygiene Services Ltd v Mitchell, an England and Wales Court of Appeal case where there were two distinct contractual relationships between the parties, a service agreement superseded by a compromise agreement, and a separate share purchase agreement, the court held that the entire agreement provisions in the compromise agreement annulled the service agreement but the share purchase agreement remained intact.

== Sample clause ==
The following language is an example of an integration clause:

This agreement (together with the documents referred to herein as from time to time amended) constitutes the entire agreement between the parties with respect to the matters dealt with herein and supersedes any previous agreement between the parties in relation to such matters. Save in respect of statements made fraudulently, the parties accept that they are to have no rights or liabilities in respect of pre-contractual statements.

== Collateral contracts ==
Parties in dispute may wish to argue that a previous understanding or implied agreement, made before a contract with an entire agreement was signed, should also be separately enforced as a collateral contract. Christopher Nugee QC, now a Lord Justice of Appeal, has ruled that the existence of an entire agreement clause within the main contract creates an "obvious difficulty" for a party who wishes to rely on such a separate agreement.

== See also ==
- Parol evidence rule
