= Parol evidence rule =

Common law rule relating to contracts

The parol evidence rule is a rule in common law jurisdictions limiting the kinds of evidence parties to a contract dispute can introduce when trying to determine the specific terms of a contract and precluding parties who have reduced their agreement to a final written document from later introducing other evidence, such as the content of oral discussions from earlier in the negotiation process, as evidence of a different intent as to the terms of the contract. The rule provides that "extrinsic evidence is inadmissible to vary a written contract". The term "parol" derives from the Anglo-Norman French parol or parole, meaning "word of mouth" or "oral", and in medieval times referred to oral pleadings in a court case.

The rule's origins lie in English contract law, but it has been adopted in other common law jurisdictions; however there are now some differences between application of the rule in different jurisdictions. For instance, in the US, a common misconception is that it is a rule of evidence (like the Federal Rules of Evidence), but that is not the case; whereas in England it is indeed a rule of evidence.

The supporting rationale for excluding the content of verbal agreements from written contracts is that since the contracting parties have agreed to reduce their contract to a single and final writing, extrinsic evidence of past agreements or terms should not be considered when interpreting that writing, as the parties ultimately decided to leave them out of the contract. In other words, one may not use evidence made prior to the written contract to contradict the writing.

== Overview ==
The rule applies to statements made orally, and to other extrinsic evidence (such as written correspondence that does not form a separate contract) regarding a contract. If a contract is in writing and final to at least one term (integrated), parol or extrinsic evidence will generally be excluded. However, there are a number of exceptions to this general rule. These include partially integrated contracts, agreements with separate consideration, in order to resolve ambiguities, or to establish contract defenses.

To take an example, Carl agrees in writing to sell Betty a car for $1,000, but later, Betty argues that Carl earlier told her that she would only need to pay Carl $800. The parol evidence rule would generally prevent Betty from testifying to this alleged conversation because the testimony ($800) would directly contradict the written contract's terms ($1,000).

The precise extent of the rule varies from jurisdiction to jurisdiction. As a preliminary or threshold issue, the court may first determine if the agreement was in fact totally reduced to a written document or (in US terminology) fully "integrated". In the case of State Rail Authority of New South Wales v Heath Outdoor Pty Ltd McHugh J held that the parol evidence rule has 'no operation until it is first determined' that all the terms of the contract are in writing. This threshold question applies even in those jurisdictions that apply a very strong form of the parol evidence rule, called the "Four Corners Rule".

Beyond that, the exceptions to the parol evidence rule vary between jurisdictions. Examples of circumstances where extrinsic evidence may be admissible in different jurisdictions include:

- To prove the parties to a contract. A written agreement to sell land signed by Mrs. Kenny at times made reference to Mr. Kenny, and the court held that oral evidence was admissible to prove that she was signing for herself and as an agent for her husband.
- To prove a condition precedent. In Pym v Campbell (1865) 119 ER 903, Pym entered into a written contract with Campbell to sell an interest in an invention. The court allowed Campbell to include the oral terms of acknowledgement that the sale was subject to an inspection and approval by an engineer. The engineer did not approve the invention.
- To prove that the written document is only part of the contract as in Hospital Products Ltd v United States Surgical Corporation, where the court found a written contract to be only part of an agreement. In State Rail Authority of NSW v Heath Outdoor Pty Ltd the court held that the parol evidence rule is persuasive and the evidentiary burden is on the party wishing to establish that the whole contract was not in writing.
- To prove that an implied term of custom, trade usage, or past dealings is part of a contract even if it is not in a written agreement. In Hutton v Warren [1836] 1 M and W 466, the party wishing to add the term bore the evidentiary burden; in this case, a lease had to be read in the light of established custom.
- To prove what is true consideration, not something added to avoid taxes.
- To prove that the term or promise is part of a collateral contract.
- To aid in the interpretation of existing terms.
- To resolve ambiguity using the contra proferentem rule.
- To show, particularly in California, that (1) in light of all the circumstances surrounding the making of the contract, that the contract is actually ambiguous (regardless of whether the contract's meaning appears unambiguous at first glance), (2) thus necessitating the use of extrinsic evidence to determine its actual meaning.
- To disprove the validity of the contract.
- To show that an unambiguous term in the contract is in fact a mistaken transcription of a prior valid agreement. Such a claim must be established by clear and convincing evidence, and not merely by the preponderance of the evidence.
- To correct mistakes.
- To show wrongful conduct such as misrepresentation, fraud, duress, unconscionability (276 N.E.2d 144, 147), or illegal purpose on the part of one or both parties.
- To show that consideration has not actually been paid. For example, if the contract states that A has paid B $1,000 in exchange for a painting, B can introduce evidence that A had never actually conveyed the $1,000.
- To identify the parties, especially if the parties have changed names.
- To imply or incorporate a term of the contract.
- To make changes in the contract after the original final contract has been agreed to. That is, oral statements can be admitted unless they are barred by a clause in the written contract.
- In Sri Lanka, to prove the presence of attendant circumstances creating a constructive trust in relation to an ex-facie absolute notarial conveyance.

In order for evidence to fall within this rule, it must involve either (1) a written or oral communication made prior to execution of the written contract; or (2) an oral communication made contemporaneous with execution of the written contract. Evidence of a later communication will not be barred by this rule, as it is admissible to show a later modification of the contract (although it might be inadmissible for some other reason, such as the Statute of frauds). Similarly, evidence of a collateral agreement - one that would naturally and normally be included in a separate writing - will not be barred. For example, if A contracts with B to paint B's house for $1,000, B can introduce extrinsic evidence to show that A also contracted to paint B's storage shed for $100. The agreement to paint the shed would logically be in a separate document from the agreement to paint the house.

Though its name suggests that it is a procedural evidence rule, the consensus of courts and commentators is that the parol evidence rule constitutes substantive contract law.

== Examples ==
The parol evidence rule is a common trap for consumers. For example:

- Health club contracts: a person may enrol in a health club and a salesperson tells them that the contract can be cancelled. They later decide that they would like to cancel, but the written contract provides that it is non-cancellable. The oral promises of the salesperson are generally non-enforceable, but the salesperson's misleading information constitutes a misrepresentation and the person may seek to rescind the contract. It may also be a violation of Consumer protection law, which may have its own remedies.
- Auto sales agreements: a person may purchase a used car, the salesperson having stated that it is "good as new", but the contract provides that the sale is as is. Again, in most circumstances the written contract controls. However, this may constitute misrepresentation, if it exceeds reasonably accepted "puffing" or "dealers' talk".
- Timeshares: in certain jurisdictions, and in certain circumstances, a consumer may have a right of rescission, although some people who attend real estate sales presentations say that they may feel pressured into immediately signing binding contracts. Evidence that the contract was entered into under duress will not be precluded by the parol evidence rule.

The effect of this can be negated sometimes by specific statutory rules around consumer contracts (e.g. the Consumer Rights Act 2015 in the United Kingdom).

== Specific jurisdictions ==
=== United States ===
In order for the rule to be effective, the contract in question must first be a final integrated writing; it must, in the judgment of the court, be the final agreement between the parties (as opposed to a mere draft, for example).

A final agreement is either a partial or complete integration, provided that it has an agreement on its face indicating its finality. If it contains some, but not all, of the terms as to which the parties have agreed then it is a partial integration. This means that the writing was a final agreement between the parties (and not mere preliminary negotiations) as to some terms, but not as to others. On the other hand, if the writing were to contain all of the terms as to which the parties agreed, then it would be a complete integration. One way to ensure that the contract will be found to be a final and complete integration is through the inclusion of a merger clause, which recites that the contract is, in fact, the whole agreement between the parties. However, many modern cases have found merger clauses to be only a rebuttable presumption.

The importance of the distinction between partial and complete integrations is relevant to what evidence is excluded under the parol evidence rule. For both complete and partial integrations, evidence contradicting the writing is excluded under the parol evidence rule. However, for a partial integration, terms that supplement the writing are admissible. To put it mildly, this can be an extremely subtle (and subjective) distinction.

To put it simply, (1) If the parties intend a complete integration of the contract terms, no parol evidence within the scope of agreement is permitted. (2) If the parties intended a partial integrated agreement, no parol evidence that contradicts anything integrated is permitted. And (3), if the parol evidence is collateral, meaning it regards a different agreement, and does not contradict the integrated terms, and are not terms any reasonable person would always naturally integrate, then the rule does not apply and the evidence is admissible.

In a minority of U.S. states, (Florida, Colorado, and Wisconsin), the parol evidence rule is extremely strong and extrinsic evidence is always barred from being used to interpret a contract. This is called the Four Corners Rule, and it is traditional/old. In a Four Corners Rule jurisdiction, there are two basic rules. First, the court will never allow parol evidence if the parties intended a full and completely integrated agreement, and second, the court will only turn to parol evidence if a contract term is wholly ambiguous. The policy is to prevent lying, to protect against doubtful veracity, to enable parties to rely dearly on written contracts, and for judicial efficiency.

In most jurisdictions there are numerous exceptions to this rule, and in those jurisdictions, extrinsic evidence may be admitted for various purposes. This is called the Admission Rule. It favors liberalizing the admission of evidence to determine if the contract was fully integrated and to determine if the parol evidence is relevant. In these jurisdictions, such as California, one can bring in parol evidence even if the contract is unambiguous on its face, if the parol evidence creates ambiguity.

The third and final admissibility rule is that under the UCC § 2-202: Parol evidence cannot contradict a writing intended to be the "final expression" of the agreement integrated but may be explained or supplemented by (a) a course of dealing/usage of trade/ course of performance, and by (b) evidence of consistent additional terms unless the writing was also intended to be a complete and exclusive statement of the terms of the agreement.

Additional information on the parol evidence rule may be found in Restatement (Second) of Contracts § 213.

=== Australia ===
In New South Wales, if an entire agreement clause, does not exist in the contract terms, parol evidence rule is a default rule of a completely written contract that the admission of extrinsic evidence is not allowed, and the contract should be understood in an objective approach.

However there are two exceptions that could overcome the parol evidence rule that extrinsic evidence is admissible: Exception 1: the contract is an oral contract or partly written. Exception 2: parties may have entered into a collateral contract, or are establishing an estoppel, with rectification, condition precedent, the true consideration, ACL, implied terms.

There are also exceptions to the parol evidence rule in construing a contract. The first exception is that there is evidence of trade usage, which is well-known, uniform and certain. Appleby v Pursell [1973] 2 NSWLR 879. Also, a narrow view of admissibility of extrinsic evidence has been taken, where evidence of surrounding circumstances is only admissible to resolve patent ambiguity, latent ambiguity, and inherent ambiguity in the meaning of the words of a contract. The High Court in Electricity Generation Corporation v Woodside Energy Ltd took a different approach to interpreting commercial contracts, considering the "language used by the parties, the surrounding circumstances known to them and the commercial purpose or objects to be secured by the contract" at the "genesis of the transaction". This necessarily implies consideration of surrounding circumstances and indicates a broader approach may be adopted by the court in the future. The latest view is the narrow view which was described in Mount Bruce Mining Pty Limited v Wright Prospecting Pty Limited.

In the New South Wales case of Saleh v Romanous, it was held that equitable estoppel triumphs common law rules of parol evidence.

See L G Throne v Thomas Borthwick where the dissent of Herron J has been subsequently adopted.

=== South Africa ===
In South Africa the Supreme Court of Appeal, beginning with the landmark ruling in KPMG Chartered Accountants (SA) v Securefin Ltd, redefined the rules relating to the admissibility of evidence that may be used in the interpretation of contracts in South Africa and in Dexgroup (Pty) Ltd v Trustco Group International (Pty) Ltd the Supreme Court of Appeal gave further clarity on these rules. The starting point is the language of the document and the parol evidence rule prevents evidence to add to, detract from or modify the words contained in the document. However, evidence to prove the meaning of the words, expressions, sentences and terms that constitute the contract, is admissible from the outset irrespective of whether there is any uncertainty or ambiguity in the text – as long as the evidence concerned points to a meaning which the text can reasonably have and the evidence is relevant to prove the common intention of the parties.

== See also ==
- English contract law
- English trusts law
- Statute of frauds
