= Kragga Kamma Estates v Flanagan =

1994 South African legal case

Kragga Kamma Estates CC and Another v Flanagan is an important case in the South African law of contract, which is an appeal of a decision in the South Eastern Cape Local Division by Jansen J. It was heard in the Appellate Division on August 19, 1994, with judgment handed down on September 29. The presiding officers were EM Grosskopf JA, Nestadt JA, Kumleben JA, Howie JA and Nicholas AJA. The appellants' attorneys were Tobie Oosthuizen, Port Elizabeth, and Webbers, Bloemfontein. The respondent's attorneys were Jankelowitz, Kerbel & Schärges, Port Elizabeth, and Lovius-Block, Bloemfontein. HJ van der Linde (with him MPQ Spruyt) appeared for the appellants; JRG Buchanan SC for the respondent.

The case concerned the remedy of repudiation for breach of contract. The purchaser had failed to pay a portion of the purchase price in terms of the deed of sale. The seller alleged that this non-payment constituted repudiation, which the seller accepted. Failure to pay constituted breach of contract due to the requirement in the contract in question that payment be made on signature of the agreement. The court assumed such breach to constitute repudiation. The seller, however, only purported to cancel the contract more than two years after the conclusion of the agreement, and after having accepted monthly payments on the balance of the purchase price. Under such circumstances, the seller was not summarily entitled to accept repudiation and cancel the contract.

The case also concerned the question of when a party is or is not in mora, specifically mora ex persona. The demand for payment was contained in the pleadings in the case. This, the court found, amounted to interpellatio iudicialis and was not per se impermissible. The demand, however, specified that payment was to be made "within a reasonable period of time", and was preceded by words "in the event that the [...] Court should find that the [seller] intended to sell the property to the [purchaser]". Such a demand, being subject to an uncertain future event, was plainly conditional and not capable of placing the purchaser in mora.

== Facts ==
The respondent, initially the plaintiff, had sold and caused to be transferred certain fixed property to the first appellant, which had been the first defendant, and was a close corporation. The second appellant (the second defendant) was one of the members of the first defendant. The plaintiff instituted an action in a Local Division claiming re-transfer. The claim was upheld on the ground that the plaintiff had subsequently cancelled the sale.

The agreement of sale, which was entered into in April 1991, provided for a purchase price of R120,000, payable as to R70,000 "on signature hereof", and as to the balance of R50,000 at a rate of R500 per month. Although the plaintiff's claim was initially based on an alleged misrepresentation by the second defendant, the plaintiff had, during the course of the trial, several times amended her particulars of claim, eventually claiming re-transfer only on the following bases:

1. The first defendant had repudiated the contract by refusing to pay the amount of R70,000, and that the plaintiff had accepted such repudiation
2. The plaintiff had cancelled the agreement as a consequence of the first defendant's failure to pay the R70,000

In its final form, paragraph 7.8 of the particulars stated that the cancellation was effected by the notice of September 30, and by way of a letter addressed to the first defendant's attorneys, dated October 5, 1993, despite demand having been made upon the first defendant by way of the notice of intention to amend of May 6, 1993, and despite the lapse of a reasonable time. The plaintiff also tendered repayment of the monthly payments of R500.

== Judgment ==
On appeal, Nestadt JA held—and EM Grosskopf JA, Kumleben JA, Howie JA and Nicholas AJA concurred—that, as to (1) above, the first defendant's failure to pay the R70,000 had then constituted a breach of the contract. It was, in light of the fact that payment had to be made on signature of the agreement, a case of mora ex re. The Court would assume, furthermore, that the breach constituted repudiation, which was what was required in terms of the plaintiff's cause of action as framed in paragraph 7.7.

Although there was, the court noted, much to be said for the conclusion that, by asserting that the amount had been paid, the first defendant was refusing to pay, and that the plaintiff should be entitled to cancel on this ground, the fact remained that the plaintiff did not purport to do so until May 1993, more than two years after the conclusion of the agreement, and after having accepted the monthly payments of R500 which the first defendant had regularly been making on account of the balance of the purchase price. Under such circumstances, the court held, the plaintiff could not summarily accept the repudiation and cancel the agreement.

In support of this conclusion, the court cited a passage from an American judgment, quoted in Williston on Contracts, to the effect that:

where time of performance is of the essence of the contract, a party who does any act inconsistent with the supposition that he continues to hold the other party to his part of the agreement will be taken to have waived it altogether. When a specific time is fixed for the performance of a contract and is of the essence of the contract and it is not performed by that time, but the parties proceed with the performance of it after that time, the right to suddenly [sic] insist upon a forfeiture for failure to perform within the specified time will be deemed to have been waived and the time for performance will be deemed to have been extended for a reasonable time.

The court held, further, that it followed that the first ground on which the plaintiff relied for her right to cancel, namely that she in May 1993 had accepted the alleged repudiation of the contract by the first defendant, was bad.

As to (2) above—that is to say, as to the plaintiff's purported cancellation of the contract some five months later—the court found, on the assumption that the first defendant had to be placed in mora (ex persona), that the question for decision was whether this had been done. If the demand for payment did not have this effect, an essential prerequisite to the plaintiff's right to cancel would be missing.

The court held that there was nothing per se impermissible about the demand being contained in the pleadings. It was a case of interpellatio iudicialis. The court held further that, whatever its form, the demand inter alia had to be unambiguous and indicate a fixed date, reasonable in the circumstances, for performance. The plaintiff's demand merely specified that payment be made "within a reasonable time". In addition, it was preceded by the statement that it only operated "in the event that the [...] Court should find that the plaintiff intended to sell the property to the first defendant". It was thus plainly a conditional demand, subject to an uncertain future event, and incapable of placing the defendant in mora. It followed that the second ground on which the plaintiff relied was also bad. The agreement was therefore not validly cancelled, and the court a quo ought accordingly to have dismissed the plaintiff's claim for retransfer of the property.

Even if there was no need for the first defendant to have been placed in mora, the appeal nevertheless had to succeed, Nestadt JA determined, because the contract was not validly cancelled for other reasons. In order to be effective, a notice of intention to cancel, as well as the notice of termination itself, had to be clear and unequivocal, and this was not the case in the instant matter. They therefore suffered from substantially the same defects as the demand for payment.

The appeal, then, was upheld, and the decision in the South Eastern Cape Local Division, in Flanagan v Kragga Kamma Estates and Another, was reversed.
