= Golden Cape Fruits v Fotoplate =

South African legal case

Golden Cape Fruits (Pty) Ltd v Fotoplate (Pty) Ltd is an important case in South African contract law, heard in the Cape Provincial Division by Diemont J and Corbett J on 13 February 1973, with judgment handed down on 8 March.

== Facts ==
In 1971, the appellant, Golden Cape Fruits, decided to have a new brochure printed by photolithographic process. It ordered direct from a specialist photolithographer, the respondent, certain photolithographic plates. These the appellant passed on to the printer, who printed the required number of copies. Owing, however, to an error in the plates, the copies could not be used. Golden Cape Fruits had claimed from Fotoplate the cost of the printing of them, on the basis of either breach of contract or of negligence.

Fotoplate's defence was that the contract was subject to a trade usage which in the circumstances absolved it from liability. This alleged usage was to the effect that Fotoplate would exhibit to Golden Cape Fruits some "rough proofs" of the plates (or positives) for approval, amendment or rejection. If these were approved, as they had been, Fotoplate's obligations under the agreement would be fulfilled by completing and delivering the positives in accordance with the proofs.

== Evidence ==
The evidence disclosed the following:

- that the mistake would not have been obvious even to an expert;
- that checking by an expert would take considerable time; and
- that neither the respondent's employees nor those of the printer had detected the error until after the copies had been printed.

== Judgment ==
A magistrate's court having granted absolution from the instance, on appeal the Cape Provincial Division held that Fotoplate had failed to discharge the onus of establishing a trade usage to absolve it from liability for breach of contract. Specifically, it had failed to establish

1. that a trade usage existed in respect of the consequences of the customer's approval of proofs;
2. that, if there was such usage, it applied to photolithographic positives and related, without qualification, to all errors, including those occurring in aspects not clearly conveyed to the customer; and
3. that, if the application to photolithographic positives were accepted subject to qualification, the error in the present case was in regard to a

matter clearly conveyed to the customer.

The court held, therefore, that judgment should have been granted for the appellant, in the amount claimed, with costs.

== Trade usages ==
In the area of implied terms, the case is an oft-cited authority on trade usage. To put the position at its lowest, the evidence required to establish a trade usage must be clear, convincing and consistent. It must, moreover, amount to something more than mere opinion. Instances of the usage's having been acted upon should be provided in order to establish the fact of its existence. No rule can be laid down as to the number of witnesses required. This depends very much upon the nature of the usage in question, the character and quality of the witnesses and the extent to which their evidence is placed in issue by other evidence. In the nature of things, the court would not readily act upon the evidence of a single witness, even if uncontradicted: a fortiori if there is a conflict in the evidence.

The judgment of Corbett JA established the requirements for a trade usage. It must

- be uniformly and universally observed;
- be long established;
- be reasonable, so that one would expect people in the trade to be aware of it;
- be notorious;
- be certain;
- not be in conflict with positive law; and
- not conflict with an express term of the contract.

== See also ==
- South African contract law
