= Le Riche v Hamman =

South African legal case

Le Riche v Hamman, an important case in South African contract law, was heard in the Appellate Division in 1946, with Watermeyer CJ, Tindall JA and Greenberg JA presiding.

== Facts ==
The plaintiff claimed transfer of a piece of land, alleging that the defendant had purchased from him another piece of land, and that both pieces had been transferred to the defendant in error. The defendant pleaded that both pieces of land had been purchased by him and that, in any event, he was unable to transfer the former piece as it had since been sold and transferred to a third party.

The trial court found that only the one piece of land had been sold to the defendant; that when defendant sold the other piece he knew that it had been transferred to him in error; and that, consequently, he was liable for the value of the land, which the court fixed at £1,250, and damages in the sum of £135.

The defendant appealed and the plaintiff cross-appealed against the valuation placed on the property.

== Judgment ==
The court held that, inasmuch as the contract for the sale of the land had been reduced to writing in a broker's note signed by the parties, and inasmuch as the description of the land therein was unambiguous, evidence was not admissible of prior discussions and correspondence to show that what was in fact sold was both pieces of land. The court held further, on the facts, that the plaintiff had furnished an acceptable explanation of how the mistake in the transfer had arisen.

It was not necessary for the plaintiff to prove that the defendant knew throughout that he had bought only the one piece of land. As his claim was a conidictio indebiti, he was entitled to the property upon proof that there was no legal or natural obligation to give transfer, and that transfer had been made by mistake—unless the defendant proved that he had sold it under the bona fide belief that it was due to him, in which case he nevertheless would have to account for the price which he had received.

The court held on the facts that the defendant had not discharged the onus of proving that he had sold the property bona fide and that, consequently, he was liable for the value of the land, whose true value was £1,700. The cross appeal thus succeeded, and the decision of the Cape Provincial Division in Hammen v Le Riche was in part confirmed and in part reversed.
