= Peters, Flamman and Company v Kokstad Municipality =

South African legal case

Peters, Flamman and Company v Kokstad Municipality, decided by Solomon JA, is an important case in South African contract law, specifically in the area of termination and supervening impossibility of performance.

The company had entered into a twenty-year contract with the municipality to light its street lamps. It managed this without trouble for more than ten years, at which point World War I broke out. The company was run and staffed by Germans, who were designated enemies of state and interned forthwith in prisoner-of-war camps. The company was handed over to and wound up by the state.

The company was clearly unable any longer to carry out its contractual obligations, so Kokstad Municipality sued for breach of contract. Solomon determined that, owing the supervening circumstances, performance was objectively impossible (casus fortuitus), and that the contract should therefore be terminated. The company's failure to perform was excused, "as no-one in those circumstances would be able to perform the contract and the impossibility is not due to his or her [that is, the company's] fault."
