= Pactum de quota litis =

A pactum de quota litis in the law of contract is an agreement by which the creditor of a sum difficult to recover promises a portion to the person who undertakes to recover it. Most often it is used in litigation, where one party provides funds for the other party's legal costs in exchange for a share of the proceeds should the case be successful.

In general, attorneys will abstain from making such a contract, and it is not legal everywhere (France being one example of making this kind of agreement unlawful).

The same counts for Belgian law, like stated in article 446ter of their Judicial Code.

And as a general rule, under the Code of Conduct issued by the Council of Bars and Law Societies of Europe, European lawyers are not permitted to charge for their services based on the principle of pactum de quota litis. This code of conduct is not always applicable in its entirety to all European lawyers, but in several European countries it has direct effect e.g. in cross border matters. There are also European bar associations which prohibit pactum de quota litis on a national level.

== See also ==
- Contract
- South African contract law
