= S v Fernandez =

South African legal case

- Court: Appellate Division
- Full case name: S v Fernandez
- Decided: 24 February 1966
- Citation: 1966 (2) SA 259 (A)

Court membership
- Judges sitting: Ogilvie Thompson JA, Wessels JA and Smit AJA

Case opinions
- Decision by: Ogilvie Thompson JA

Keywords
- Criminal law, Culpable homicide, Negligence

In S v Fernandez, an important case in South African criminal law, heard on February 17, 1966, the court held that the appellant had been negligent in mending a cage from which a baboon had subsequently escaped, which subsequently bit a child, who subsequently died. The appellant must have foreseen the likelihood of an attack in the event of the baboon's escaping; he was, the court held, therefore rightly convicted of culpable homicide. The case was an appeal from a decision in the Transvaal Provincial Division by Galgut J and Clayden J, who had dismissed an appeal from a conviction in a magistrate's court.

== Facts ==
The appellant had been charged with and convicted of culpable homicide. It appeared that he was a partner in a partnership which owned and conducted a small shop, adjacent to which was a baboon, kept in a cage-like structure. Arriving at the shop one morning, he found the animal outside the cage. On inspection of the cage, he found that one of the lower horizontal planks at the back of the cage had apparently broken, thereby creating an opening through which the animal had easily made its exit.

After arming himself with a revolver, he persuaded the animal to re-enter the cage and then decided to repair the cage. He removed the whole of the broken plank. He placed one end of a new plank on the inner side of the right terminal uprights, leaving the other end of the plank wholly unsupported. He was busy nailing the supported end when the animal got out again in the same place. The animal snatched a baby, one Elpitha Piccoco, from a perambulator, bit it and then, apparently intimidated by revolver shots fired by the appellant, threw the child to the ground and retreated into its cage.

== Argument ==
In an appeal from a decision of a Provincial Division, which had dismissed an appeal from a conviction in a magistrate's court, D. Kuny, for the appellant, argued that the appellant, in repairing the cage, did all that could reasonably have been expected of him in the circumstances. His conduct in that regard was not in any way negligent. The second escape of the baboon was not attributable to any fault on his part. In any event, even if the appellant was negligent in the above respect, he could not reasonably have foreseen the death of the deceased as a result of such negligence.

GN Barrie, for the State, contended that, in order to hold the appellant liable for the death of the child, it was necessary to show that he at least had custody or control of the animal at the time of the attack on the child; there must have been some degree of culpa on his part. In Robertson v Boyce, the Appeal Court had recognised the principle that dogs were ferae naturae; as such, the owners must be taken to know of their vicious propensities.

It was therefore submitted by the State that it was not necessary to prove scienter of such viciousness before liability could be attached to a person having the ownership, custody or control over such an animal when it causes damage. Monkeys, the State noted, have been held to be animals ferae naturae. It was submitted that baboons also fell within this category.

In any event there was ample evidence, the State contended, to show that the appellant had knowledge of the vicious tendencies of the baboon. The only inference to be drawn from all the evidence was that, if the appellant was not in fact the owner, he, at the very least, had the custody and control of the animal. It was clear in South African law that the owner of a vicious animal which attacks a person who was lawfully at the place where he was injured, and who neither provoked the attack nor by his negligence contributed to his own injury, was liable, as owner, to make good the resulting injury. If an owner keeps such an animal on his premises, it is his duty to take proper care of it. He is under an obligation to see that the animal is not a danger to persons lawfully on his premises.

If the liability depended upon negligence, the negligence would consist in the owner's allowing it to be at large and not under control, although he knew, or ought to know, or must be taken to have known, that it was an animal ferae naturae, and that it might, therefore, at any time, indulge in its ferocious propensities. The test in determining whether or not a person was negligent in the keeping of a vicious animal was whether or not he acted as a reasonable man. The appellant was negligent in that he did not satisfy himself that the cage was in a satisfactory condition. The very fact that the baboon succeeded in escaping from the cage went to show that the cage was inadequate for the purpose it was intended to serve.

Alternatively, the State argued, the cage became inadequate subsequently, and the appellant was negligent in not satisfying himself from time to time that the cage remained in a good and serviceable condition. There was ample evidence on record, the State continued, to show that the appellant, as a reasonably prudent person, must have foreseen the possibility of an attack by the baboon; in fact, he did foresee the possibility.

The appellant, as a reasonable and prudent person, must have foreseen the possibility that an attack by the baboon could have fatal results. The State contended that the court should ascertain whether there had been, on the part of the appellant, an omission to do something which he ought under the circumstances to have done, which would have prevented the occurrence. The obvious answer was that appellant had omitted to see that the cage was at all times in a good and safe condition.

Furthermore, the reasonable man would, under the circumstances in which appellant found himself, have seen to it that the cage was at all times safe, and in a proper condition. This omission to act as the reasonable man amounted, in the State's view, to negligence, for which appellant could be held criminally responsible.

Here it was stated that the test of negligence to be applied in criminal trials was the same as that applied in civil cases: the standard of care and skill which would be observed by a reasonable man. The appellant had failed to observe that degree of care which a reasonable man would have observed under the circumstances: that is to say, the degree of care which the diligens pater familias, or the average prudent person, would have observed. On this culpa the appellant's accountability for the unintentional death of the child was based.

== Judgment ==
The Appellate Division found that at all material times the baboon was in the custody and control of the appellant. It was, accordingly, the appellant's duty to see that the animal was not permitted to remain outside its cage.

The court held further that the appellant had taken no steps whatsoever to see that the animal did not get out of its cage while he was engaged in repairing it. He must have foreseen the likelihood of the animal making an attack upon somebody should it get out of the cage. The court held, therefore, that the appellant had been rightly convicted.

== See also ==
- South African criminal law
